= Ikaba area =

The Ikaba area is situated in Namibia in the far east of the Zambezi Region in Kabbe constituency. The area falls under the Subia traditional authority.

The Ikaba area is frequently affected by flooding as it is very flat area, only 2 to 5 meters above river level.

There are four schools in the Ikaba area: Nankuntwe Junior Secondary school, Ikaba Junior Secondary School, Muzii Junior Secondary School, and Mpukano Primary School. There is a clinic at Itomba, operated by the Ministry of Health and Social Services. This clinic helps a lot of people living that area, as it is the only clinic available. Many people in this area have to walk long distances to be treated. It is still assisting people from Nsundwa area as they do not have a clinic in their area.

Ikaba has only seen little development because of the recurrent flooding; chief Chika Matondo built his headquarters at Ikaba before moving to Luhonono, today known as Schuckmansburg.

Schuckmansburg was a name given by the Germans, replacing Luhonono. The name has been replaced again by the government and has retained the name by which it was called before, Luhonono. This name is significant to that place because the area has a lot of trees called Mohonono, which is why it was given that name.

Some other changes which have taken place in this Ikaba area is that Kabbe constituency has been divided into two constituencies. The two new constituencies are Kabbe north and Kabbe south, of which Ikaba is falling under Kabbe south headed by Honorable John Likando. This was done in August 2013 following the recommendation of the Fourth Delimitation Commission of Namibia to split Kabbe into two, in preparation for the 2014 general elections.

Improvements in this area are underway to reconstruct good roads by developing in order for more developments to take place. They are constructing bridges in order to have permanent roads, instead of using boats when it is flooded.
