= Judea Lyaboloma Constituency =

Electoral constituency in Namibia's Zambezi region

Judea Lyaboloma
- Constituency
- Region: Zambezi Region
- Population: 8,738
- Major settlements: Sangwali
- Area: 1,723 km²

Current constituency

Judea Lyaboloma Constituency (red) in the Zambezi Region

Judea Lyaboloma is a constituency in Namibia's Zambezi Region. The administrative centre of the constituency is the settlement of Sangwali, situated 130 kilometres south-west of the region's capital, Katima Mulilo. It has a population of 8,738 and covers an area of 1,723 km², resulting in a population density of approximately 5.071/km².

== Geography ==
Judea Lyaboloma Constituency borders Sibbinda Constituency in the north, Kongola Constituency in the northwest, and Botswana in the south.

Most areas within the constituency are located alongside the Kwando and Linyanti rivers. The temperature ranges between 10°C and 38°C, with most rainfall occurring between December and March. The constituency lies between the Linyanti River in the south and the Kwando River in the west, forming the Linyanti Swamp. The northern part of the constituency is dry and prone to annual droughts.

== Economy and infrastructure ==
The constituency is an important tourist destination. Nkasa Rupara National Park and Mudumu National Park are situated here, with a variety of facilities. There are also several nature conservancies.

There is a health centre at Sangwali and a clinic at Sachona.

== Politics ==
The 2015 regional election was won by Beaven Bashole Munali of the SWAPO Party with 1,078 votes, followed by Oscar Zambo Munanzi of the Rally for Democracy and Progress (RDP) with 120 votes. In the 2020 regional election there were 3,339 registered voters. Gwelu Humphrey Divai obtained 1,250 votes and won the constituency as an independent candidate, ahead of ahead of Vincent Bafeze Sinalumbu, the SWAPO candidate, who got 722 votes.

== See also ==
- Administrative divisions of Namibia
