= Subiya =

Subiya may refer to:

- Subiya people
- Subiya language
- Subiya, Kuwait - region in northern Kuwait
