= Kabbe =

Settlement in Namibia

- Settlement
- Location in Namibia
- Country: Namibia
- Region: Zambezi Region
- Constituency: Kabbe North
- Time zone: UTC+2 (South African Standard Time)
  - Summer (DST): SAST
- Climate: Cwa

Kabbe is a settlement in Namibia's Zambezi Region, located 53 kilometres southeast of the region's capital, Katima Mulilo. It serves as the administrative centre of the Kabbe North Constituency.

Kabbe North Constituency was established in August 2013, following the Fourth Delimitation Commission of Namibia's recommendation to split the former Kabbe Constituency into two: Kabbe North and Kabbe South. This division was made in preparation for the 2014 general election.

The area around Kabbe is known for its lush vegetation and diverse wildlife, making it a key part of the Zambezi Region's ecosystem. The settlement and its surrounding villages face seasonal flooding, which can impact infrastructure and accessibility. Despite these challenges, the community relies on subsistence farming, fishing, and small-scale commerce for their livelihoods. Additionally, Kabbe plays a role in regional tourism, attracting visitors interested in its natural beauty and cultural heritage. The settlement has a clinic, Kabbe Clinic.
