= Lisikili =

- Settlement
- Location in Namibia
- Coordinates: 17°33′11″S 24°25′52″E
- Country: Namibia
- Region: Zambezi Region
- Constituency: Kabbe Constituency
- Elevation: 3,094 ft (943 m)
- Time zone: UTC+2 (SAST)
  - Summer (DST): SAST

Lisikili is a settlement in Namibia's Zambezi Region, located 22 kilometres southeast of the region's capital, Katima Mulilo. It falls under the Kabbe Constituency with its own Lisikili Clinic.

== Name ==
The settlement's name comes from the Silozi word musikili which means Mahogany Tree (Trichilia emetica). These trees are found in riverine vegetation and open woodlands.
