= Nakabolelwa =

Settlement in Namibia

- Settlement
- Location in Namibia
- Country: Namibia
- Region: Zambezi Region
- Constituency: Kabbe South
- Time zone: UTC+2 (South African Standard Time)
  - Summer (DST): SAST
- Climate: Cwa

Nakabolelwa is a settlement in Namibia's Zambezi Region, located 79 kilometres southeast of the region's capital, Katima Mulilo. It serves as the administrative centre of the Kabbe South Constituency.

Kabbe South Constituency was established in August 2013, following the Fourth Delimitation Commission of Namibia's recommendation to split the former Kabbe Constituency into two: Kabbe North and Kabbe South. This division was made in preparation for the 2014 general election.
