= Mayuni Conservancy =

Protected area in Namibia

Mayuni Conservancy is a conservation area in Namibia's northeastern Zambezi Region, along the eastern bank of the Cuando River. It is situated south of the National Road B8 and east of Bwabwata National Park. It belongs to the Kongola electoral constituency.

The conservancy was established in 1999. It covers 151 km^{2} (58 sq mi) and has a population of 2,759 people.

== Facilities ==
Nambwa Campsite is in the Mayuni conservation area and started its operations in the year 2004. Nambwa is in the Kongola area in the Caprivi region. The campsite is located on the west of Katima Mulilo along the Katima Mulilo Highway, on the peripherals of the Bwabwata National Park.
