= Zilitene, Namibia =

Zilitene
- Location in Namibia
- Coordinates: 17°50′S 024°22′E
- Country: Namibia
- Region: Zambezi
- Constituency: Katima Mulilo Rural

Population (2006)
  - Total: c. 800

Zilitene is a community located in the Zambezi Region of Namibia. As of 2006, Zilitene has a population of approximately 800 people within 167 households. Zilitene also has a community forest.

Zilitene is east of Windhoek, the capital city of Namibia.
