= Lusata Festival =

Folk festival in Namibia

Lusata Festival is an annual festival, held in Namibia at Chinchimani, Zambezi Region, for all Mafwe tribal people of Namibia and nearby countries.

The Mafwe people are one of the largest ethnic groups in the Zambezi Region. They speak ChiFwe. The festival celebrates traditional values, commemorates the past, and looks forward to the future. It occurs annually in the last week of September. The festival's name is a reference to the royal mace an ivory-encrusted stick.

Most people from all villages in Caprivi Strip come to celebrate by dancing and feasting. It always is held in the village where the king stays in Chinchimani village, 6 km away from Katima Mulilo. The king advises his people on how to reduce crime in the community, the region and even nationwide. The king of the Mafwe is George Simasiku Mamili and the name Mamili is a royal name of Mafwe kings. The festival was always controlled by Induna Silalo and the Ngambela of the traditional court. The king used to wear traditional clothes such as the skin of a tiger and other animal skins.

Most Mafwe celebrate Lusata like Zambians since they are from Zambia and Lusata is the scepter of the chief which traditionally unites people. The government of Namibia used to help with transport to take people from distant villages such as Malengalenga, Linyanti, and others. Most chiefs attend this ceremony. Most chiefs from Zambia and Botswana come to see how the Mafwe are living. Before the current king, the Lusata was at the Mulenenyi Linyanti village – before the former chief, Mamili Bebi, went to Dernmark.
