= Sibbinda Constituency =

Electoral constituency in Namibia's Zambezi Region

Coordinates: 17°47′S 23°49′E

Sibbinda constituency (red) in the Zambezi Region

Sibbinda Constituency is a constituency in Namibia's Zambezi Region, with its administrative centre located in the settlement of Sibbinda. As of 2023, it has a population of 17,126 residents.

Sibbinda Constituency is situated alongside the Trans-Caprivi Highway. borders three other Zambezi constituencies: Linyanti in the southwest, Katima Mulilo Rural in the east, and Kongola in the north. It further borders Botswana in the far southeast. The settlement Chinchimane belongs to this constituency. The constituency covers an area of 1,699 km², resulting in a population density of 6.0 people per km².

== Politics ==
In the 2004 regional election, SWAPO candidate Felix Mukupi received 1,683 of the 2,856 votes cast and became councillor. He was re-elected in 2010. In 2012, Ignatius Chunga (SWAPO) became constituency councillor after winning a by-election scheduled following Mukupi's death in a car accident. Chunga was re-elected in 2015 with 1,924 votes, followed by Luseso Parry Malumbano of the Democratic Turnhalle Alliance (DTA) with 322 votes and Lister Limbo Sabuta of RDP with 314 votes.

In the 2020 regional election, which had 6,248 voters registered in Sibbinda, Micky Mumbali Lukaezi of the Independent Patriots for Change (IPC, an opposition party formed in August 2020) won. He received 1,693 votes. The sitting councillor, SWAPO's Ignatius Chunga, came second with 1,160 votes.
