= Trichilia stellato-tomentosa =

Conservation status
- Least Concern (IUCN 2.3)

Scientific classification
- Kingdom: Plantae
- Clade: Tracheophytes
- Clade: Angiosperms
- Clade: Eudicots
- Clade: Rosids
- Order: Sapindales
- Family: Meliaceae
- Genus: Trichilia
- Species: T. stellato-tomentosa

Binomial name
- Trichilia stellato-tomentosa Kuntze

Species of flowering plant

Trichilia stellato-tomentosa is a species of plant in the family Meliaceae. It is found in Argentina, Bolivia, Brazil, and Paraguay.
