= Kabe =

Kabe may refer to:

== People ==
- Alhaji Kabe (died 1753), Sultan of Kano
- Kazimierz Bein (1872–1959), Polish Esperanto author, translator and ophthalmologist
- Masayoshi Kabe (1949–2020), Japanese musician
- Miran Kabe (born 1992), Japanese football player

== Transport ==
- Kabe Line, in Hiroshima, Japan
- Kabe Station (Hiroshima), Japan
- Kabe Station (Tokyo), Japan
- Lehigh Valley International Airport, in Pennsylvania, United States

== Other uses ==
- Kabe Constituency, Namibia
- KABE-CD, a television station licensed to Bakersfield, California, United States
- Kabe, a character in Star Wars portrayed by Rusty Goffe
