= Simataa Secondary School =

Secondary school in Namibia

- Zambezi Region; Namibia

Information
- School type: Secondary school

Simataa Secondary School is a school in the Zambezi Region of Namibia. It is situated near the headquarters of the Mafwe traditional authority in Chinchimane, some 70km south of Katima Mulilo. Patron of the school is Deputy Minister of Information and Communication Technology, Stanley Simataa.

== See also ==
- Education in Namibia
- List of schools in Namibia
