= École normale supérieure de Maroua =

- Type: Teacher training institution
- Established: August 9, 2008
- Founders: Government
- Budget: 16.4 billion FCFA
- Location: Maroua, Cameroon; 10.625076°N 14.3809077°E
- Campus: Kongola
- Language: French and English
- Website: www.univ-maroua.cm

The École normale supérieure de Maroua is an elite bilingual institution (French and English) of higher education affiliated with the University of Maroua in Cameroon. It is responsible for training teachers for secondary schools, normal school teachers, and school and career counselors.

== History ==
The school was established by Presidential Decree No. 2008/282 of August 9, 2008.

== Infrastructure ==
The campus of this school is located in Kongola, Djoulgouf, Kodek, and includes a 650-seat university restaurant, a 500-seat auditorium, a university residence with 316 beds, an infirmary, classroom blocks, administrative buildings, a library, and laboratories.

== Academics ==
=== Admission ===
Admission to this school is through competitive entrance examinations.

=== Degrees offered ===
The École normale supérieure de Maroua offers degrees in:

- Secondary School Teacher (First and Second Grades) (DIPES I and DIPES II),
- Normal School Teacher (First and Second Grades) (DIPEN I and DIPEN II),
- School and Career Counselor (DIPCO),
- Master's degree,
- Doctorate (Ph.D.).

== Organization ==
=== Directors ===
- Saïbou Issa (2009–2020)
- Clément Dili Palaï (2020–present)
