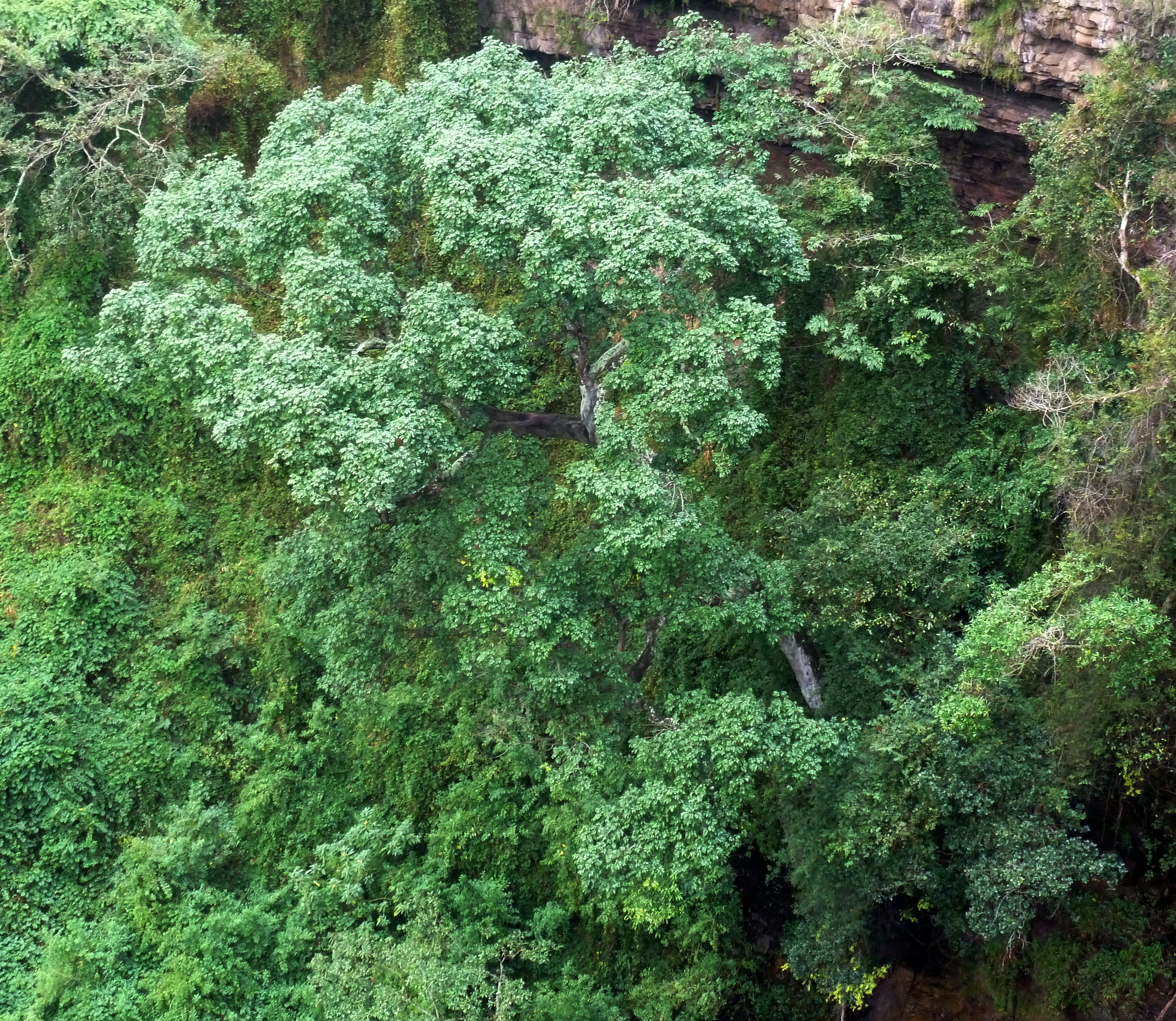
- T. dregeana in coastal scarp forest

Scientific classification
- Kingdom: Plantae
- Clade: Tracheophytes
- Clade: Angiosperms
- Clade: Eudicots
- Clade: Rosids
- Order: Sapindales
- Family: Meliaceae
- Genus: Trichilia
- Species: T. dregeana

Binomial name
- Trichilia dregeana Sond.

= Trichilia dregeana =

Forest natal-mahogany

Species of tree

Trichilia dregeana, commonly known as the forest natal-mahogany, is a tree in the family Meliaceae. These trees are found in forest areas from the Eastern Cape of South Africa to Tropical Africa.

== Description ==
The 7 to 11 leaflets of the large compound leaf have 7 to 12 lateral veins, typically less than the related Natal mahogany. The dehiscent fruit is reddish brown, spherical and about 3 cm in diameter. As with the Natal mahogany, each black seed is almost enveloped by a red aril.

== Gallery ==
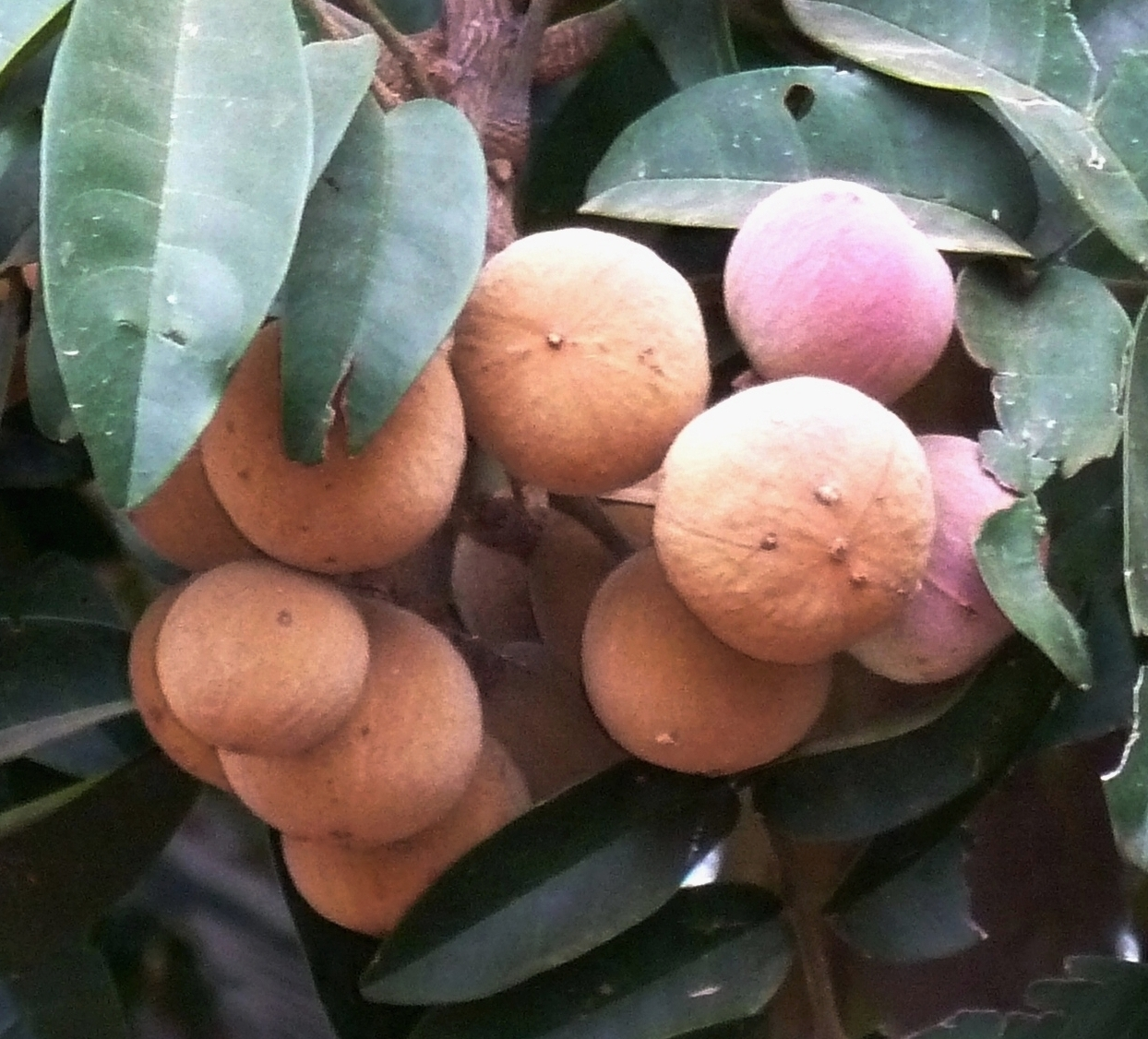
Fruit

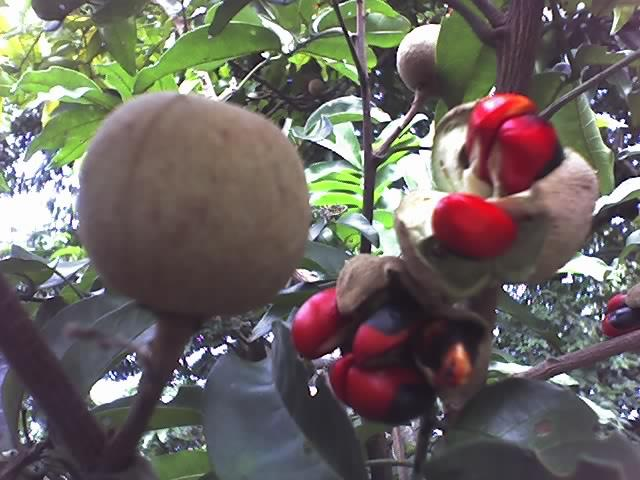
Fruit and black seeds with red arils

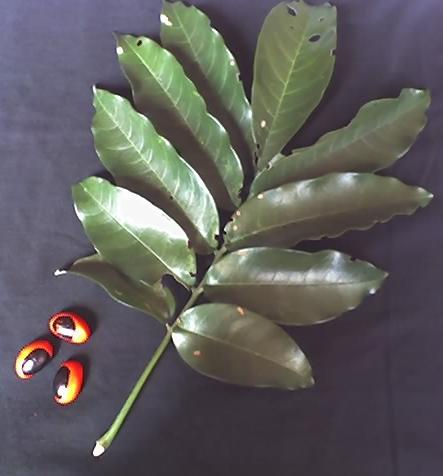
Seeds and compound leaf

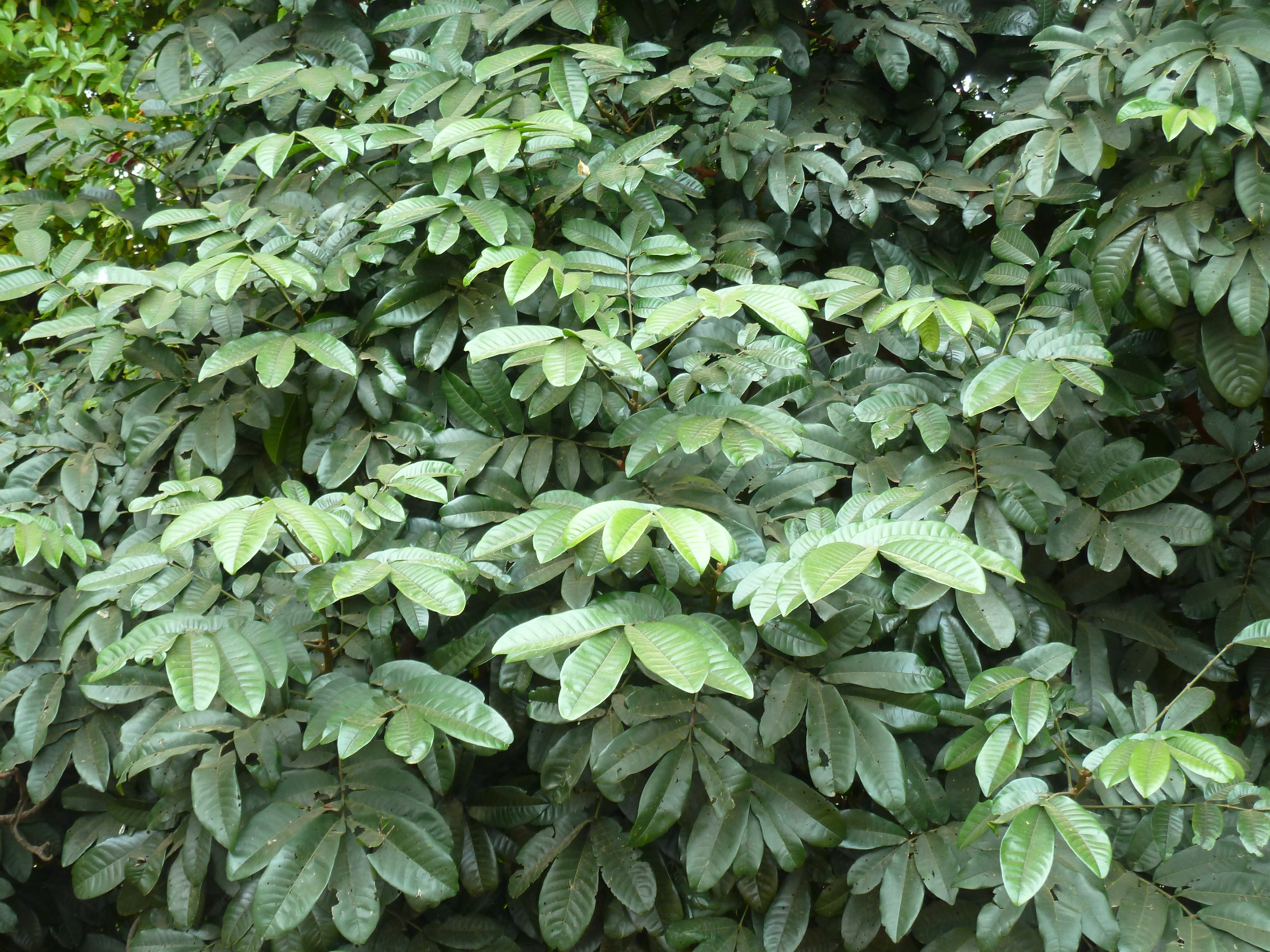
Foliage
