= Mubiza, Namibia =

Mubiza
- Interactive map of Mubiza
- Coordinates: 17.508°S 24.327°E
- Country: Namibia
- Region: Zambezi Region

Mumbiza is a village in the Zambezi Region of Namibia, east of Katima Mulilo, the capital of the Zambezi Region. Mumbiza is north of Botswana, and south of the Zambezi River and Zambia.

It was one of the first villages in the area to do away with the practice of open defecation.
