= Bukalo =

Village in Zambezi Region, Namibia

- Village
- Bukalo
- Location in Namibia
- Coordinates: 17°44′S 24°33′E
- Country: Namibia
- Region: Zambezi Region
- Constituency: Katima Mulilo Rural
- Proclaimed: 2013

Government
  - Chief Executive Officer: Anna Sazita
- Elevation: 938 m (3,077 ft)

Population (2023)
  - Total: 1,935
- Time zone: UTC+2 (South African Standard Time)
- Postal code: 20004
- Area code: 066
- Climate: Cwa

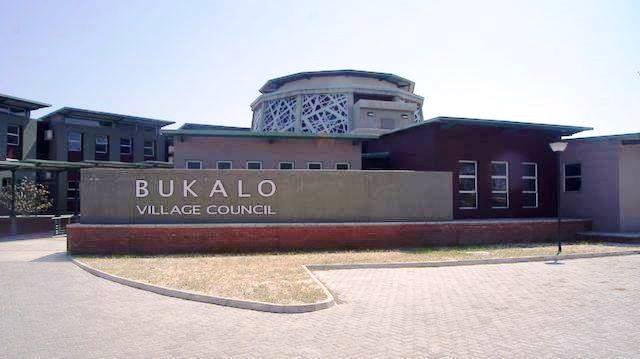
Bukalo Village Council building in 2022

Bukalo is a village in Namibia. It is located in the Zambezi Region, 43 kilometres southeast of Katima Mulilo, the regional capital. Bukalo is also the royal headquarters of the Subia people. It serves as the administrative centre of the Katima Mulilo Rural Constituency. As of 2023, Bukalo has 1,935 inhabitants.

== History ==
Historical population
Year	Pop.	±% p.a.
2011	978	—
2023	1,935	+5.85%

Bukalo has long been a settlement of the Subia people, a Bantu-speaking group native to southern Africa. The Subia are a tribe of the larger Lozi ethnic group, with significant populations in Botswana, Namibia, and Zambia.

Under the leadership of King Lilundu Lituu (1640–1665), who succeeded his father King Ikuhane, the Subia migrated from the Chobe River southwards and settled in present-day Botswana. In 1876, Mwanamwale and a group of Subia men crossed the Zambezi River and established his leadership at Sesheke in Zambia.

King Mutwa Liswani II (1965–1996) later established his royal palace at Bukalo in Namibia. To this day, Bukalo remains the royal headquarters of the Subia people—a centre of traditional governance where cultural events, royal ceremonies, and public meetings take place.

=== Etymology ===
The name Bukalo means settlement in Chikuhane, the language of the Subia people. It reflects the early days when the area served as a royal homestead before it was formalised as a village.

== Governance ==
In 2013, the Government of Namibia under former President Hifikepunye Pohamba granted Bukalo official village status. Following its proclamation, the Bukalo Village Council was established to oversee local governance and development.

The council is made up of elected councillors and is supported by a chief executive officer, Anna Ntwala Sazita, who manages the village's administration. The council is responsible for infrastructure development, land allocation, water services, and coordination with regional and traditional leaders.

== Subia Royal Palace and Traditional Authority ==
At the heart of Bukalo lies the Subia Royal Palace, the official residence of the Subia King and the seat of the Subia Traditional Authority.

The palace, founded by King Mutwa Liswani II, continues to function today under the leadership of King Gilbert Muhongo Mutwa. It is a place where matters of tradition, customary law, cultural identity, and heritage preservation are addressed. The King also plays a cross-border cultural role with Subia communities in Zambia and Botswana.

The palace holds symbolic importance for the Subia people, who travel from across the region to attend royal ceremonies, dispute resolutions, and annual events.

== Culture and Language ==
The majority of Bukalo's population are Subia, a subgroup of the Lozi people. The main language spoken is known as Chikuhane or Chisubia, although Silozi is widely understood and used as a lingua franca.

The village hosts traditional ceremonies that showcase Subia dances, attire, and ancestral practices. As the seat of the royal palace, Bukalo plays a key role in preserving Subia customs and uniting Subia communities across Namibia, Zambia, and Botswana.
