= Trichilia chirriactensis =

Conservation status
- Critically Endangered (IUCN 3.1)

Scientific classification
- Kingdom: Plantae
- Clade: Tracheophytes
- Clade: Angiosperms
- Clade: Eudicots
- Clade: Rosids
- Order: Sapindales
- Family: Meliaceae
- Genus: Trichilia
- Species: T. chirriactensis

Binomial name
- Trichilia chirriactensis (Standley & Steyermark) Pennington

Species of flowering plant

Trichilia chirriactensis is a species of plant in the family Meliaceae. It is endemic to Guatemala.
