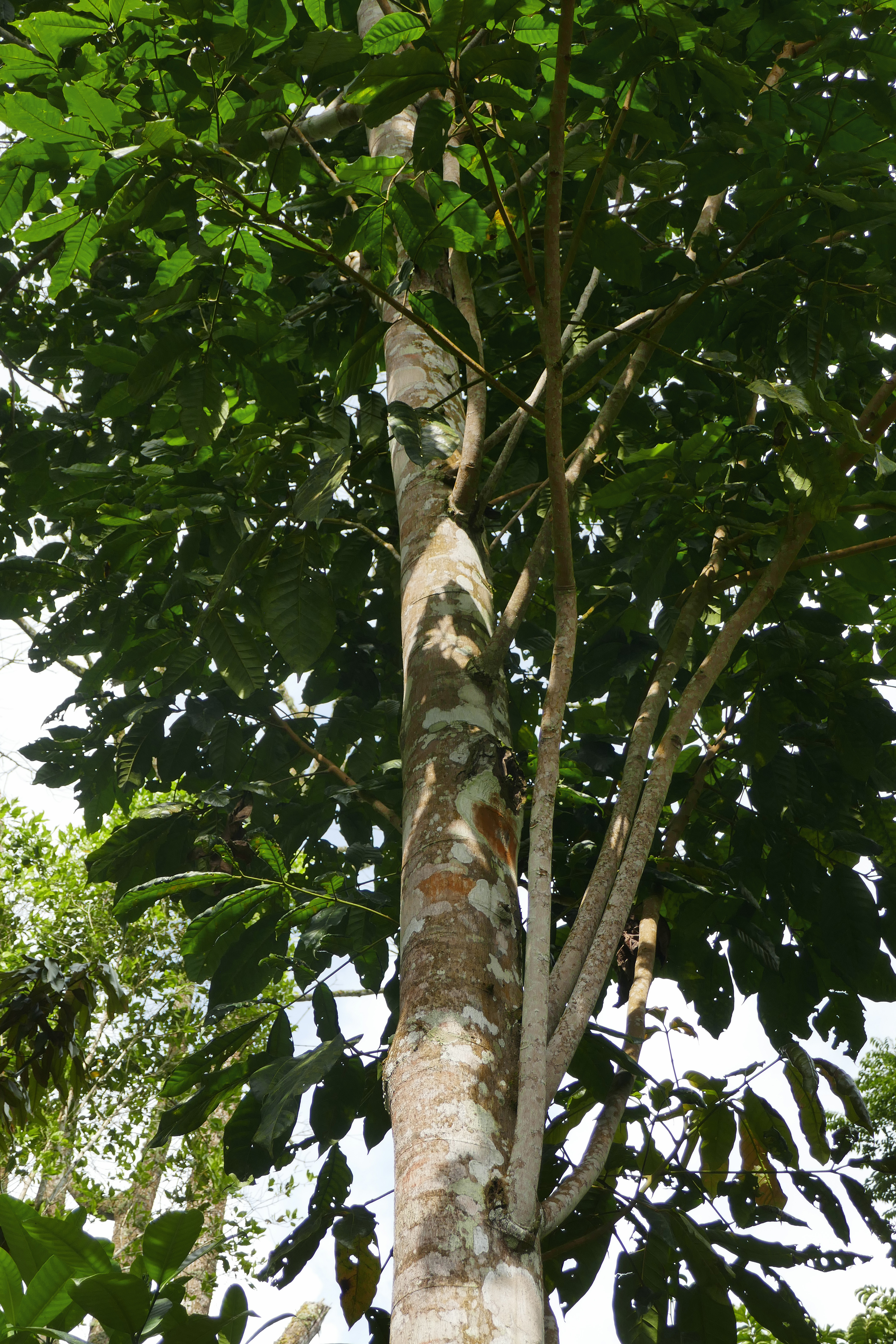

Conservation status
- Near Threatened (IUCN 2.3)

Scientific classification
- Kingdom: Plantae
- Clade: Tracheophytes
- Clade: Angiosperms
- Clade: Eudicots
- Clade: Rosids
- Order: Sapindales
- Family: Meliaceae
- Genus: Trichilia
- Species: T. grandifolia

Binomial name
- Trichilia grandifolia Oliv.

= Trichilia grandifolia =

Species of flowering plant

Trichilia grandifolia is a species of plant in the family Meliaceae. It is a tree endemic to São Tomé Island.
