= Trichilia breviflora =

Conservation status
- Endangered (IUCN 3.1)

Scientific classification
- Kingdom: Plantae
- Clade: Tracheophytes
- Clade: Angiosperms
- Clade: Eudicots
- Clade: Rosids
- Order: Sapindales
- Family: Meliaceae
- Genus: Trichilia
- Species: T. breviflora

Binomial name
- Trichilia breviflora Blake & Standley

Species of flowering plant

Trichilia breviflora is a species of plant in the family Meliaceae. It is found in Mexico, Belize, Guatemala, and Honduras.
