= Trichilia discolor =

Conservation status
- Endangered (IUCN 2.3)

Scientific classification
- Kingdom: Plantae
- Clade: Tracheophytes
- Clade: Angiosperms
- Clade: Eudicots
- Clade: Rosids
- Order: Sapindales
- Family: Meliaceae
- Genus: Trichilia
- Species: T. discolor

Binomial name
- Trichilia discolor Adr. Jussieu

Species of flowering plant

Trichilia discolor is a species of plant in the family Meliaceae. It is endemic to Pará state in Brazil. It is threatened by habitat loss.
