= Subia people =

Bantu-Botatwe ethnic group of Southern Africa

Baikuhane / Basubia
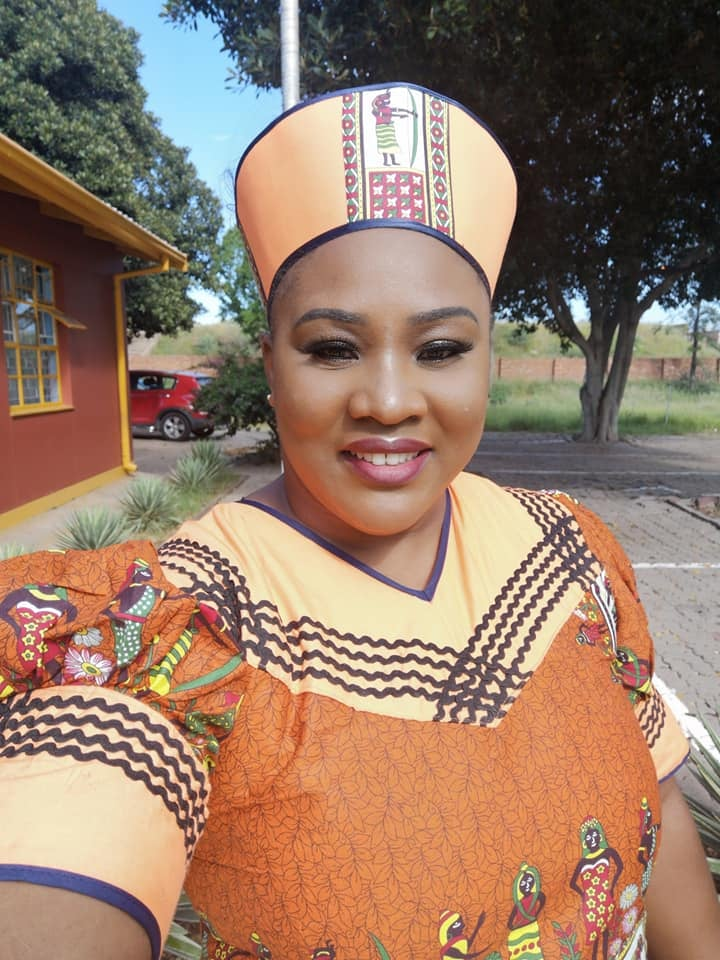
- Subia woman wearing a musisi

Total population
- 73,390

Regions with significant populations
- Namibia: 62,590 (2023 census)
- Botswana: 7,900
- Zambia: 2,900

Languages
- Subia

Religion
- Christianity

Related ethnic groups
- Bantu-Botatwe people

The Ikuhane people, also known as the Subiya or Subia, are a Bantu-speaking ethnic group native to Southern Africa. They are part of the larger Bantu-Botatwe people ethnic group and have significant populations in Botswana, Namibia, and Zambia. Their language is known as the Kuhane language (Chikuhane) or the Subia language (Chisubia), but Silozi is used as the formal language in official, educational and media contexts.

== Name ==
They get their name from the second known Subia King, Ikuhane, who reigned until the 1570s. A single Ikuhane person is referred to as Muikuhane while many Ikuhane people are referred to as Baikuhane. The prefix Mu- is singular and the prefix Ba- is plural. However, Baikuhane are most popularly known as the Subia. The exonym Subia came from neighbouring people and it is derived from the word ‘subila’ which means light in reference to their light skin complexion. A single Subia person is referred to as Musubia while many Subia people are referred to as Basubia or Masubia.

== History ==
The Subia are a Bantu speaking ethnic group that migrated southward of Africa. Itenge, the first known Subia King's reign lasted until the 1570s. During this time, he led the migration from the north and settled at Kafue floodplains. Itenge's son, Ikuhane, succeeded his father and his reign was from 1575 – 1600. Under his leadership, the people migrated from Kafue and settled along the Zambezi valley. They later moved southwards and settled along the Chobe River which the Subia also named Ikuhane River in his honour. Baikuhane simply means the followers of King Ikuhane or the people from the Chobe River and their language is called Chikuhane, also known as Chisubia.

Under the leadership of Lilundu Lituu (1640 – 1665) who succeeded his father Ikuhane, the Subia migrated from the Chobe River southwards and settled in Botswana. In 1876, Mwanamwale and a section of Subia men crossed the Zambezi River and established his leadership at Sesheke in Zambia. Mutwa Liswani II (1965 – 1996) established his royal headquarters at Bukalo in Namibia and is still the Subia headquarters until today.

Subiya Royal Lineage

1.Iteenge (1440s/1570s) He was the first known chief of the tribe. He is believed to have led the migration from the North and settled at Kafue floodplains. The Zambezi–Chobe basin is known as Iteenge in Subiya after him.

2.Ikuhane (1575 - 1600) He was the son of Iteenge and the second chief of the tribe. He migrated from the Kafue floodplains and settled along the Zambezi valley in present-day Zambia. He later moved southwards and settled along the Chobe River which is called Ikuhane in Subiya.

3.Lilundu - Lituu (1640 – 1665) He succeeded his father Chief Ikuhane. He migrated from the Chobe River southwards and settled at Mababe (Mavava) south of Savuti (Savuta) in present-day Botswana.

4.Queen Mwale Ikuhane (1665 – 1700) She was the first queen to rule the Subiya tribe. She succeeded her brother Lilundu - Lituu and settled at Goha Hills north of Savuti in present Botswana and the place came to be known as Ngulwa-Mwaale.

5.Cheete (1700s) He ruled over a section of the Subiya who fled Lozi attacks and lived in Tokaland near Livingstone, Zambia.

6.Sikute (1700s) Sikute led a section of the Subiya from the western tips of Iteenge today known as Linyanti swamps to the Chungwe-namutitima (Victoria Falls). There he joined the Leya and married one of their women. Sikute carried with him the Subiya royal drums known as the Makuwakuwa which had mystical powers. Sikute was also believed to have a pot of medicine which when opened released an epidemic in an area. Due to Sikute's migration the Subiya became one of the tribes of the Victoria Falls together with the Leya and the Toka. It is believed that when Chief Mukuni of the Leya defeated the Subiya of Sikute and captured them together with their royal drums, the magical drums escaped into the Zambezi and settled at the bottom where their sound continued to be heard for many years afterwards.

7.Saanjo(1700s) He was also called Singongi. He succeeded Queen Mwaale at Goha Hills (Ngulwa-Mwaale) in Chobe District, Botswana. Saanjo had three children with his wife Chaaze, two boys called Mafwira I and Nsundano I and their sister Mwaale.

8.Mafwira I (1700s) He was the eldest son of Chief Saanjo with his wife Chaaze. He led the Subiya migration from Goha Hills back to the Ikuhane (Chobe) River and settled at Kavimba in the present Chobe enclave, Botswana. His rule was unpopular and soon deposed and replaced by his younger brother, Nsundano I.

9.Nsundano I (1700s -1750) He was also called Lyiverenge. He migrated northwards from Kavimba and established his headquarters at Luchindo in the present Caprivi Strip, Namibia, opposite Ngoma border post. Today Luchindo is a shrine (Chidino) of all the Basubiya tribe.

10.Liswani I (1830–1845) He was the son of Princess Mwaale, the daughter of Chief Saanjo and sister to Mafwira I and Nsundano I. His father was Sikarumbu, who was also known as Raliswani. He succeeded Nsundano I; his maternal uncle. He was married to Malyangala with whom he had a son named Maiba I. He had his headquarters at Isuswa in the modern Caprivi Strip, Namibia. He rescued Sekgoma I, son of Kgari of Bamangwato and Letsholathebe, son of Moremi I of Batawana from Sebitwane at Kazungula.

11.Nkonkwena I (1845–1876) He was known by his nickname ‘Mutolalizuki’. He was the son of Princess Nsazwe, the elder sister of Chief Liswani I. His father was Kabende. Chief Nkonkwena had three sisters namely, Ntolwa, Mpambo and Chire. Chief Nkonkwena I was a polygamist. His wives were Nkungano and Ikume. Ikume begot Mafwira II, the chief of the Subiya of Gumare in north-west Botswana and his brother Nsundano. Ikume gave birth to one son called Sinvula. He established his headquarters at Impalila Island in the modern Caprivi Strip, Namibia. He fled from Barotse to seek refuge in Khama's land, where he died at Rakops in 1878.

12.Queen Ntolwa (1876–1900) She was the younger sister of Nkonkwena I and the second queen to rule the Subiya. She was married toMbanga and had four sons named Chombo, Mwampole, Kasaila, and Mwanamwali. She built her royal palace at Isuswa in the present-day Caprivi Strip, Namibia. She succeeded her brother Chief Nkonkwena I, after the latter feared the Lozi and fled to Boteti.

13.Mwanamwale I (1876) He was the son of Queen Ntolwa with her husband Mbanga. He and a section of Subiya men were following his fleeing uncle Nkonkwena, who was heading for Boteti. They went as far as Sitengu Pan, about twenty-eight miles south of Kasane but failed to catch him up. They then returned to Impalila Island, crossed the Zambezi and established his leadership at Sesheke in Zambia.

14.Mwanamwale II He succeeded MwanamwaleI; his father at Sesheke, Zambia. His real name was Munikuunku, but he was famously known by his nickname Inguu, meaning the shepherd.

15.Kabuku (August 1886) He was installed Subiya chief at Sesheke now in the Western Province of Zambia. In Sesheke the Subiya chief's title is Mwanamwale as opposed to Muniteenge or Moraliswani used in Caprivi Strip and Chobe District. He probably succeeded Mwanamwale II.

16.Maiba I (1900 – 1909) He was the only son of Liswani I. He fled to Boteti under the guidance of his cousin Nkonkwena I. He returned from Boteti in the 1900 and succeeded Queen Ntoolwa at Isuswa as the Subiya Chief in Caprivi Strip, Namibia. By now Subiya chieftainship was divided along colonial lines of Northern Rhodesia, South West Africa, Namibia and Bechuanaland Protectorate.

17. Chika II (1901–1927) He was also called Chika Chika. He was the son of a commoner, Chika, and Malyangala. Chika was a hunter from Zambia who came to live among Basubia. He died leaving his wife, Malyangala, pregnant. At the time Muniteenge Liswani I married Malyangala while she was still pregnant. Malyangala gave birth to a boy, and Liswani I gave him the name of Chika, his real father. Chika Chika was among the Basubiya who fled from Mpalila Islands to Rakops under the leadership of Nkonkwena I in 1876. He returned from Rakops in 1900 and settled briefly among a section of Basubiya at Mababe (Mavava).In 1901 he was installed regent of Basubiya at Munga west of Kavimba on behalf of the young Prince Sinvula Nkonkwena who was then living among the Basubiya of Livingstone in the former Northern Rhodesia (today's Zambia).

18.Chika Matondo Tongo (1909 – 1927 and 1937 - 1945) He was a regent acting for the young Liswaninyana. Liswaninyana was the eldest son of Chief Maiba I and Chika-Matondo Tongo was appointed regent by virtue of marriage to Mulela; who was Liswaninyana's maternal aunt. He established his headquarters at Schuckmansburg (Luhonono) in Eastern Caprivi, Namibia.

19.Liswaninyana (1927–1937) He was the eldest son of Maiba I with his wife Kahundu. He established his royal headquarters at Kasika Village in the modern Caprivi Strip, Namibia opposite Chiduudu (Sedudu Island). He died shortly after assuming the throne and Chika Matondo continued to act on the throne till 1945.

20.Sinvula Nkonkwena (1928–1968) He was born in Khama's land; Tsienyane at Rokops. He was the son of Chief Nkonkwena I with his wife Ikume. He established his headquarters at Munga Village north-west of Kavimba, Chobe District, Botswana. His brothers were Mafwira II and Nsundano.

21.Sinvula Maiba (1945–1965) He was the son of Maiba I and also the younger brother of Liswaninyana. His home village was Mahundu in the present-day Eastern Caprivi Strip, Namibia. He built his headquarters at Kabbe Village in the present Eastern Caprivi Strip, Namibia.

22.Mutwa Liswani II (1965–1996) He was the second eldest son of Sinvula Maiba above. His elder brother was Shakufweba. He established his royal headquarters at Vwikalo (Bukalo) in the present-day Caprivi Strip, Namibia.

23.Maiba II Sinvula (1968-to date) He is the son of Sinvula Nkonkwena and also the grandson of Nkonkwena I. He succeeded his aged father and set his headquarters at Kavimba Village, Chobe District, Botswana.

24.Maiba Liswani III (1996–to July 21, 2021) He is the youngest son of Sinvula Maiba. He succeeded his elder brother Mutwa Liswani II, who died in 1996. He has also maintained the headquarters placed at Vwikalo (Buikalo), Caprivi Strip, Namibia by his late brother.

25.Gilbert Mutwa Muraliswani

== Social organization ==
At the head of the family is the eldest male, usually the grandfather. Relation is a result of marriage, birth or adoption.

Marriage is of utmost importance among the Subia as it is a means of cementing and extending family relations. A man of age is expected to have work, have his own homestead called Ilapa and then find a wife to marry. The wife is expected to relocate to her husband's homestead, joining her in-laws and becoming part of that family. The wife and children take the husband's surname as they are part of his family. How the married couple manages its ilapa, ensures a particular status in society. Albeit waning in modern times, polygamy is prevalent among the Subia.

They live off farming and gathering, hunting, and fishing. The women are responsible for farming activities while the men deal with the hunting and fishing. Their staple food is hard porridge (inkoko) with fish or sour milk (masanza).

The Masubia villages are called minzi. The homes consist of huts made up of a mud wall and thatch roof or houses with concrete walls and sheet metal roofs. The huts are surrounded by a reed fence known as ilapa. The villages often consist of 15 to 30 families..

== Religious beliefs ==
Ileza or Ireza is the Subia term for God, regarded as the Creator of the world and characterised by eternal, omnipotent, and omniscient qualities. The Subia hold that Ileza is uniquely singular, with no partners or equals.

Ileza is known by various names and attributes, each highlighting a different aspect of His nature. These include Muvumbi, meaning "The Creator," and Simwine, meaning "The King." Ileza is considered both transcendent, existing beyond the physical world, and immanent, present in all things and aware of all actions performed by His creations.

The Subia believe that Ileza communicates with humanity through Mapolofita, meaning "prophets." He is seen as the ultimate judge of humanity, possessing the power to grant eternal reward or punishment based on an individual's faith and actions.

Masubia religion is based on ancestor worship, wherein the deceased ancestors are regarded as guardian spirits. Those who do not honor nor show respect to these spirits are punished. They believe that these spirits have a connection with the Creator, and serve as mediators. According to the Joshua Project, forty percent of the Masubia are Christians while sixty percent practice ethnic religion.

== Subia astronomy ==
Astronomy is a natural science, that studies celestial bodies in the heavens above, from the known galaxies to galaxies far beyond our own known Milky way Galaxy. The Subia use to study and interpret celestial objects and phenomenas. This includes objects that they could see with their naked eyes, like the sun and moon.The moon is called Mwezi. Its function is for light at night, to tell the month, which is also called Mwezi, and seasons. The sun is called Izuba. Its function is for daylight, (hence why a day is called izuba as well) and the sun is used to tell the time of the day used to determine directions.

== Subia food and cuisine ==
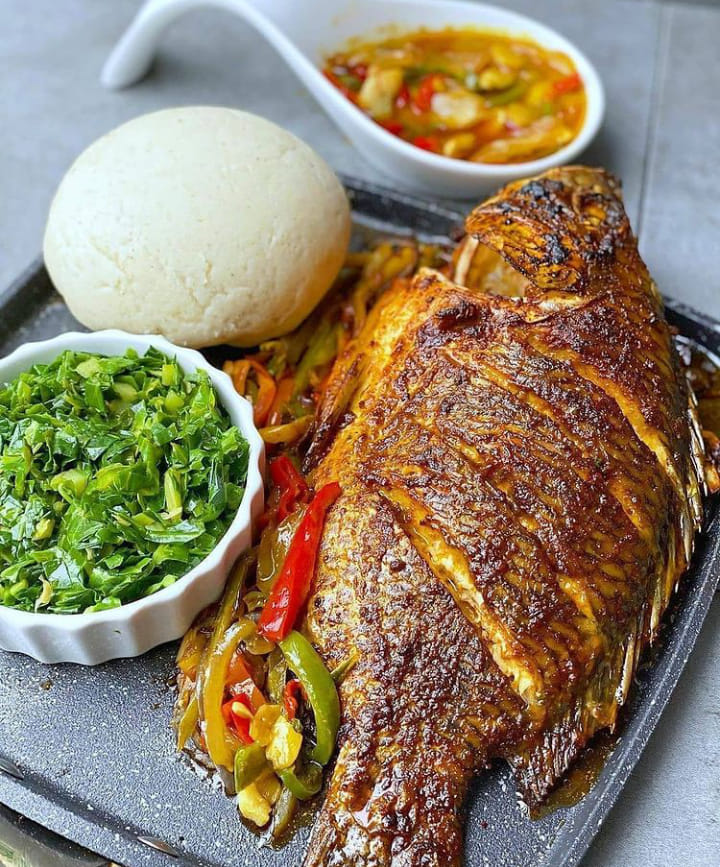
Subia food & cuisine

The staple food of the Subia is maize meal porridge called Inkoko. It is often eaten with Zambezi Bream fish along with vegetables or the porridge is eaten with milk called Masanza. This dish is often served at gatherings, weddings or funerals.

== Subia culture and attire ==
The Masubia are well known for their vibrant cultural dances known as Chipelu and Chizo and their traditional attire, Musisi.

The Musisi is the traditional attire worn by Lozi women. In Silozi, the term "musisi" translates to "skirt." This garment features two layers, with the top layer being stiffened to retain its shape. It is usually made from satin and often complemented by a matching shawl called a "cali," another Silozi term. Women also wear a chitenge to cover themselves especially from the waist down and always cover their hair with a headscarf. This attire provides women with modesty, respect, and dignity.

== Subia music ==
The music performed by the Subia is called Chipelu. It is a kind of Lozi dance usually danced by young men and women. Chipelu music and dance are social activities that take place throughout the year at different social events in the community. It is performed by dance groups for the king at his palace or when he visits the communities in their villages. Dancing also takes place at weddings, political rallies or school meetings but not at funerals. Each Chipelu group composes its own songs usually addressing social issues in the community.

== Subia arts and crafts ==
The Subia are fine potters due to their free access to clay soils and wood for the ovens. They are also known for their skill at crafting baskets which can be used in harvesting crops and sifting maize flour. They also make necklaces from beads, mats out of reeds and whole canoes for fishing.

== Notable Subia people ==
- Beatrice Masilingi, Olympic Athlete
- John Sinvula Mutwa, Chief of Namibia Defence Force (2013–2020)
- Kenneth Matengu, Vice-Chancellor of the University of Namibia.
- Ryan Nyambe, Football player
