= Trichilia solitudinis =

Conservation status
- Vulnerable (IUCN 2.3)

Scientific classification
- Kingdom: Plantae
- Clade: Tracheophytes
- Clade: Angiosperms
- Clade: Eudicots
- Clade: Rosids
- Order: Sapindales
- Family: Meliaceae
- Genus: Trichilia
- Species: T. solitudinis

Binomial name
- Trichilia solitudinis Harms

Species of plant

Trichilia solitudinis is a species of plant in the family Meliaceae. The plant is native to the Amazon region, in Pará and Roraima states of northern Brazil, and adjacent Peru. It is threatened by habitat loss.
