= Trichilia pseudostipularis =

Conservation status
- Near Threatened (IUCN 2.3)

Scientific classification
- Kingdom: Plantae
- Clade: Tracheophytes
- Clade: Angiosperms
- Clade: Eudicots
- Clade: Rosids
- Order: Sapindales
- Family: Meliaceae
- Genus: Trichilia
- Species: T. pseudostipularis

Binomial name
- Trichilia pseudostipularis (A. Juss.) C. de Candolle

Species of flowering plant

Trichilia pseudostipularis is a species of plant in the family Meliaceae. It is endemic to Brazil. It is threatened by habitat loss.
