= Sangwali =

Settlement in Zambezi Region, Namibia

- Settlement
- Location in Namibia
- Coordinates: 18°16′S 23°38′E
- Country: Namibia
- Region: Zambezi Region
- Constituency: Judea Lyaboloma Constituency
- Elevation: 3,123.6 ft (952.06 m)

Population (2023)
  - Total: 8,738
- Time zone: UTC+2 (South African Standard Time)
  - Summer (DST): SAST
- Climate: Cwa

Sangwali is a settlement in the Zambezi Region of north-eastern Namibia. Situated 130 kilometres south-west of the region's capital, Katima Mulilo, it serves as the administrative centre of the Judea Lyaboloma Constituency. Sangwali is the Royal Headquarters of the Yeyi people.

Sangwali was a place of residence for David Livingstone in the 1850s before he proceeded further north. The settlement features a small museum outlining his life and work.

== In the media ==
- Sangwali (2016) is the title of a book by Konny von Schmettau. It narrates the life of David Livingstone.
