= Trichilia trachyantha =

Conservation status
- Endangered (IUCN 2.3)

Scientific classification
- Kingdom: Plantae
- Clade: Tracheophytes
- Clade: Angiosperms
- Clade: Eudicots
- Clade: Rosids
- Order: Sapindales
- Family: Meliaceae
- Genus: Trichilia
- Species: T. trachyantha

Binomial name
- Trichilia trachyantha (Griseb.) C.DC.

Synonyms
- Moschoxylum trachyanthum Griseb.

Species of flowering plant

Trichilia trachyantha is a species of flowering plant in the family Meliaceae. It is endemic to Cuba.
