= Bruno von Schuckmann =

German lawyer and consular officer (1857-1919)

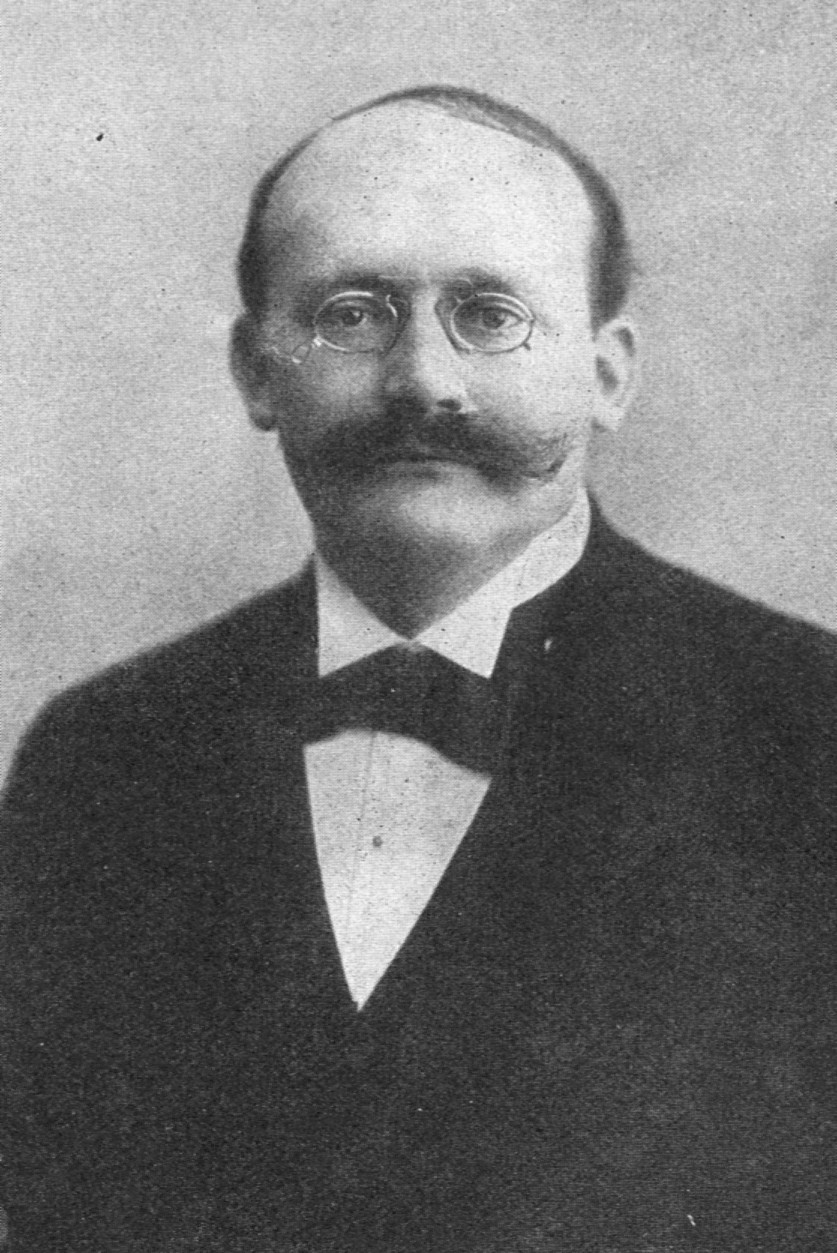
Bruno von Schuckmann

Bruno von Schuckmann (3 December 1857 in Rohrbeck, Arnswalde District – 6 June 1919 in Stettin) was a German lawyer and consular officer. He was an imperial governor in German South West Africa and a member of the Prussian House of Representatives.

In April 1890, Schuckmann moved as an "auxiliary worker" to the colonial department of the Federal Foreign Office, where he was promoted to the Legation Council in May 1891. As early as July 1891, he was sent to Cameroon to represent Governor Eugen von Zimmerer. Returning to Berlin at the end of January 1892, he became German Consul-General in Cape Town in October 1895.

Back in Berlin, Schuckmann became Secret Legation Council in December 1899. On 17 December 1901 he went into temporary retirement. From 1904 to 1907 he held a seat in the Prussian House of Representatives for the Conservative Party. On 21 May 1907 he was called back to the Reichsdienst and from July 1907 appointed governor of German South West Africa. He held this position until June 1910 but finally resigned because of the government's diamond policy. The newly founded town of Schuckmannsburg, since 2013 known as Luhonono, was named after him during his time in office as governor.

Between 1911 and 1918 Schuckmann was again a member of the Prussian House of Representatives. In 1911 he acquired the Fischerheide Forest estate in the Arnswalde district.

In the First World War, despite his age, he became a volunteer in the 3rd Guard Lancers, as a sergeant and a lieutenant in the reserve. At times he acted as chairman of the economic committee of the Ghent stage inspection. Schuckmann succumbed to an illness in June of 1919 that he had contracted in the field.
