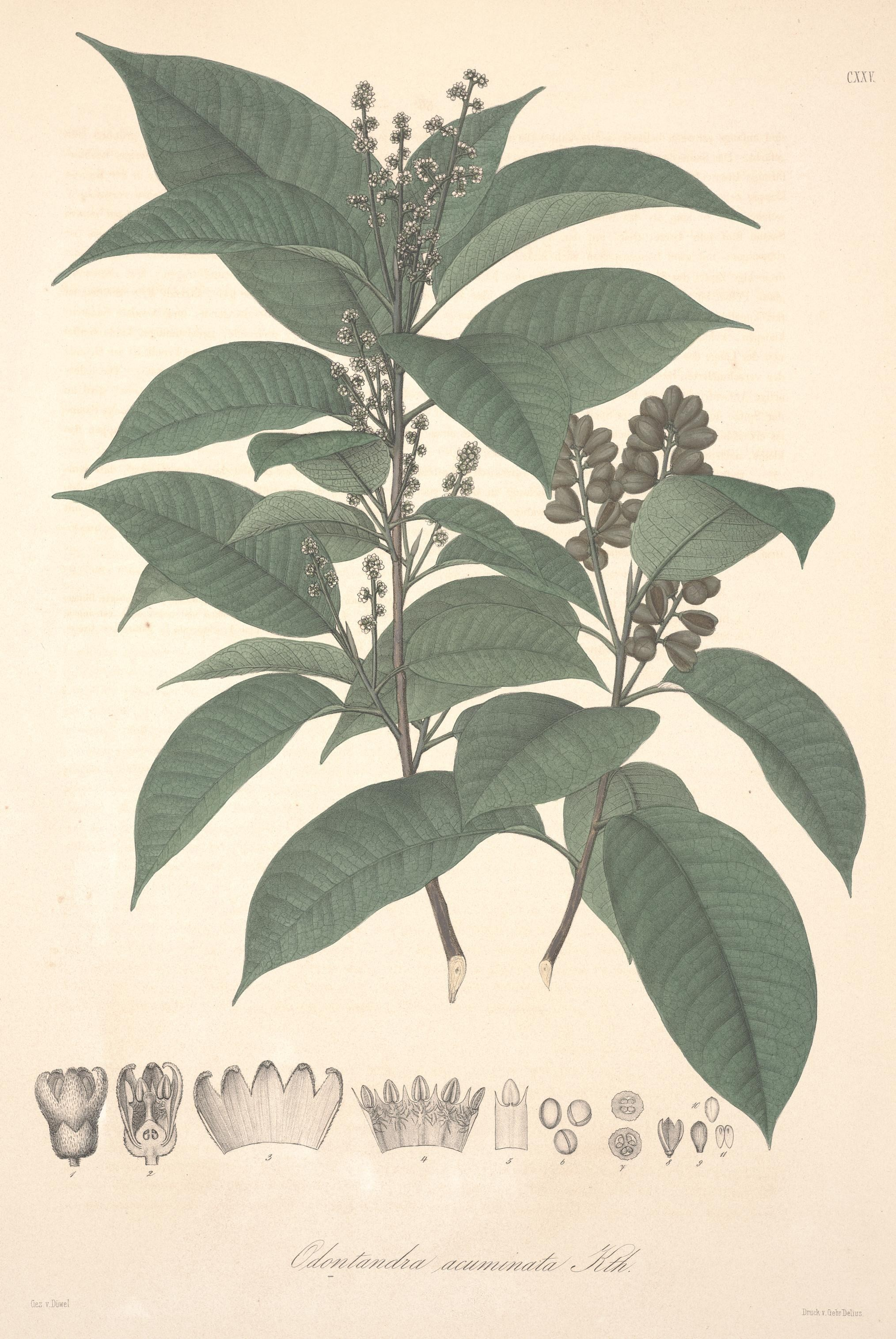

Conservation status
- Vulnerable (IUCN 2.3)

Scientific classification
- Kingdom: Plantae
- Clade: Tracheophytes
- Clade: Angiosperms
- Clade: Eudicots
- Clade: Rosids
- Order: Sapindales
- Family: Meliaceae
- Genus: Trichilia
- Species: T. acuminata

Binomial name
- Trichilia acuminata (Humb. & Bonpl. ex Roemer & Schultes) C. de Candolle

= Trichilia acuminata =

Species of plant

Trichilia acuminata is a species of plant in the family Meliaceae. It is found in Colombia and Panama.
