= Cinchonain-Ib =

- Chemical structure of cinchonain-Ib

Names
- IUPAC name (2R,3R,4′′S)-4′′-(3,4-Dihydroxyphenyl)-3,3′,4′,5-tetrahydroxy-6′′H-pyrano[2′′,3′′:7,8]flavan-6′′-one
- Systematic IUPAC name (2R,3R,10S)-2,10-Bis(3,4-dihydroxyphenyl)-3,5-dihydroxy-3,4,9,10-tetrahydro-2H,8H-(benzo[1,2-b:3,4-b′]dipyran)-8-one

Identifiers
CAS Number	85022-69-1
3D model (JSmol)	Interactive image
ChEMBL	ChEMBL401058
ChemSpider	8631931
PubChem CID	442675
UNII	F742N63ATR
CompTox Dashboard (EPA)	DTXSID40331901
- InChI: InChI=1S/C24H20O9/c25-14-3-1-10(5-17(14)28)12-8-21(31)32-20-9-16(27)13-7-19(30)23(33-24(13)22(12)20)11-2-4-15(26)18(29)6-11/h1-6,9,12,19,23,25-30H,7-8H2/t12-,19+,23+/m0/s1 Key: LKCOZWLUAKSRQM-IBUUURQNSA-N
- SMILES: O=C5Oc3c(c2O[C@H](c1ccc(O)c(O)c1)[C@H](O)Cc2c(O)c3)[C@H](c4ccc(O)c(O)c4)C5

Properties
Chemical formula	C_{24}H_{20}O_{9}
Molar mass	452.415 g·mol^{−1}
- Except where otherwise noted, data are given for materials in their standard state (at 25 °C [77 °F], 100 kPa). verify (what is ?) Infobox references

Cinchonain-Ib is a flavonolignan found in the bark of Trichilia catigua used as catuaba. A 2009 study revealed that Cinchonian-Ib derived from boiled Eriobotrya japonica leaves has a glucose-lowering effect in rats, and could possibly be used to manage diabetes mellitus in humans.
