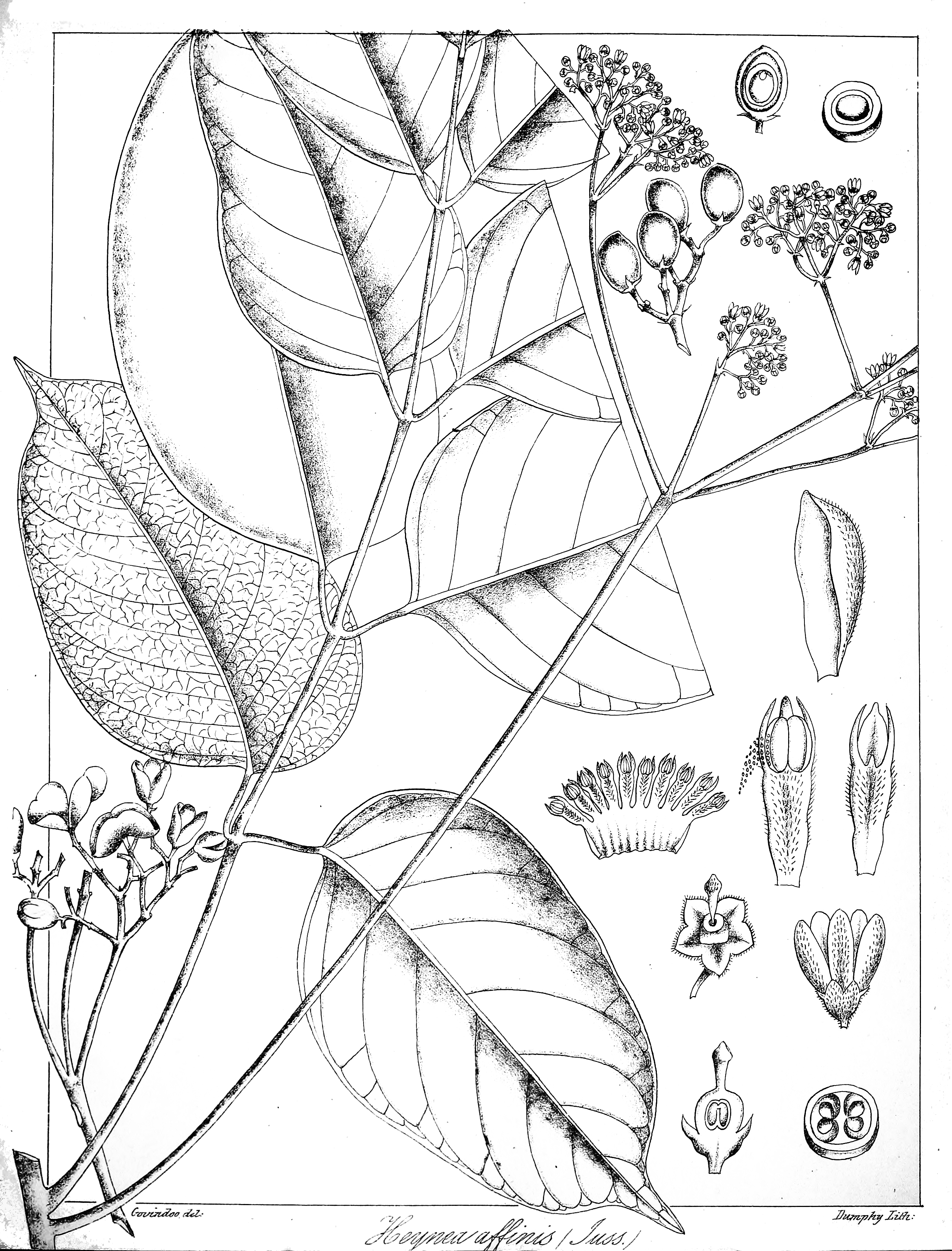

Scientific classification
- Kingdom: Plantae
- Clade: Embryophytes
- Clade: Tracheophytes
- Clade: Angiosperms
- Clade: Eudicots
- Clade: Rosids
- Order: Sapindales
- Family: Meliaceae
- Genus: Trichilia
- Species: T. catigua

Binomial name
- Trichilia catigua A.Juss.

= Trichilia catigua =

Species of flowering plant

Trichilia catigua is a flowering plant species in the genus Trichilia.

The species is used in folk medicine and shamanism in the aphrodisiac and stimulant catuaba. Cinchonain-Ib is a flavonolignan found in the bark of T. catigua. Catuaba from Trichilia catigua was found to increase the release of Serotonin as well as Dopamine in rats. Additionally, Trichilia catigua was shown to have neuroprotective effects in rats.
