= Sibbinda =

Settlement in Namibia

- Settlement
- Location in Namibia
- Coordinates: 17°47′0″S 23°49′52″E
- Country: Namibia
- Region: Zambezi Region
- Constituency: Sibinda Constituency
- Elevation: 3,130.9 ft (954.31 m)
- Time zone: UTC+2 (SAST)
  - Summer (DST): SAST

Sibbinda is a settlement in the Zambezi Region of north-eastern Namibia. Situated 64 kilometres south-west of the region's capital, Katima Mulilo, it serves as the administrative centre of the Sibbinda Constituency.

== Politics ==
In 2013, Sibbinda was made the centre of the new Sibbinda Constituency by the former President of Namibia, Hifikepunye Pohamba.
