= Trichilia lovettii =

Conservation status
- Least Concern (IUCN 3.1)

Scientific classification
- Kingdom: Plantae
- Clade: Tracheophytes
- Clade: Angiosperms
- Clade: Eudicots
- Clade: Rosids
- Order: Sapindales
- Family: Meliaceae
- Genus: Trichilia
- Species: T. lovettii

Binomial name
- Trichilia lovettii Cheek

Species of flowering plant

Trichilia lovettii is a species of plant in the family Meliaceae. It is endemic to Tanzania.
