= Ngoma, Namibia =

Ngoma
- Settlement
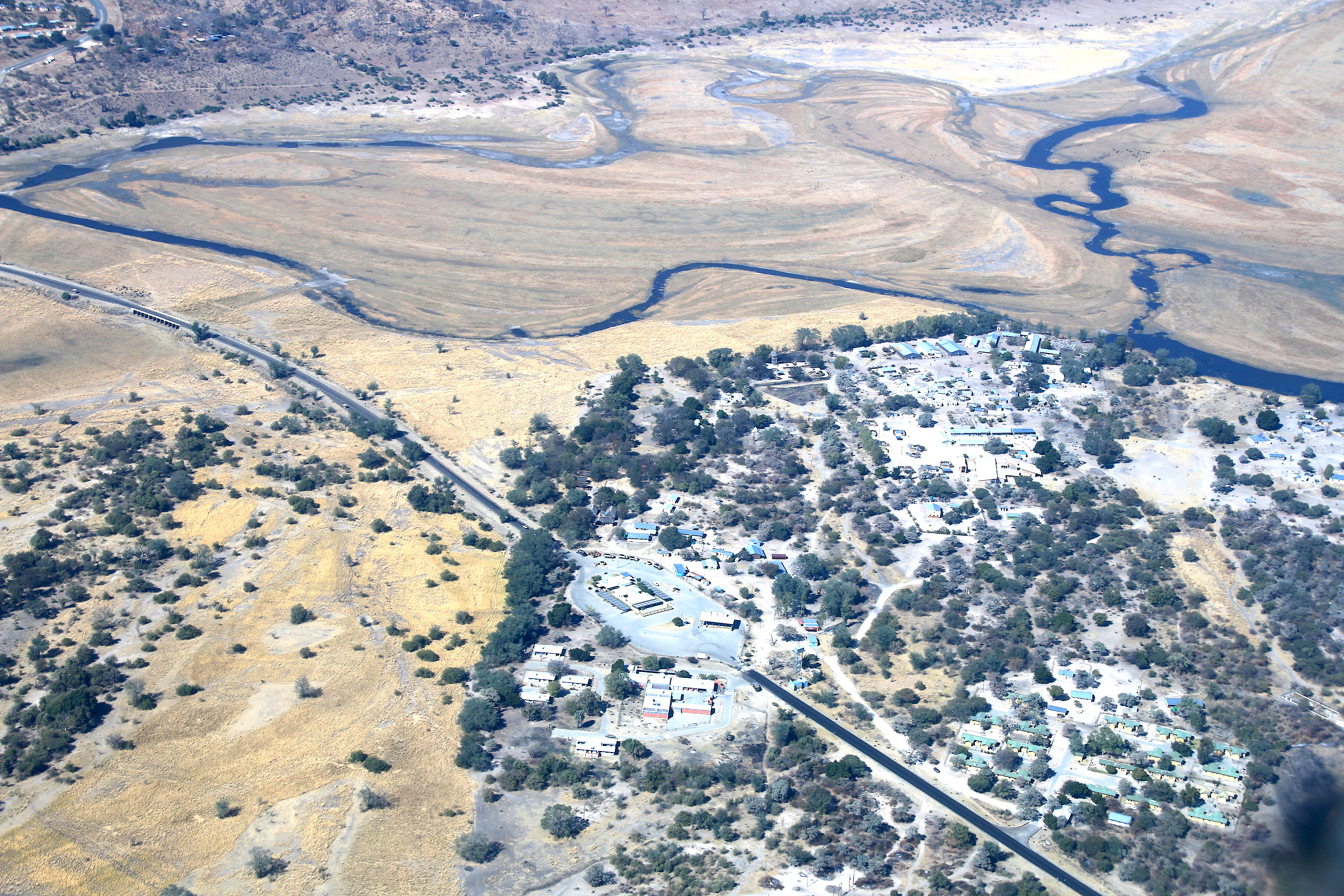
- Aerial view of Ngoma and Chobe River

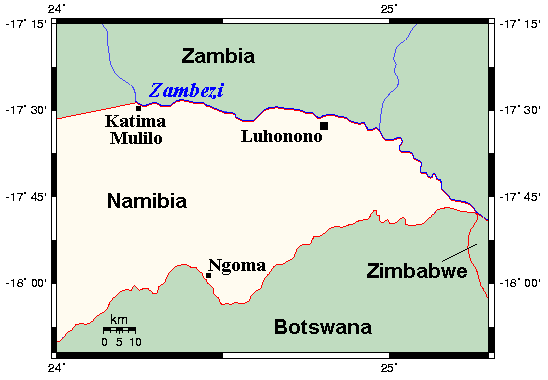
- Location in Zambezi Region

- Location within Namibia
- Coordinates: 17°53′S 24°43′E
- Country: Namibia
- Time zone: UTC+2 (SAST)

Ngoma is a settlement in Namibia's Zambezi Region, located 70 kilometres southeast of the region's capital, Katima Mulilo. It falls under the Katima Mulilo Rural Constituency. Serving as a crucial border crossing between Namibia and Botswana, Ngoma features the Ngoma Bridge, which crosses the Chobe River. This bridge facilitates significant traffic and trade between the two nations. The settlement has one medical facility, Ngoma Clinic.

== Name ==
The word "Ngoma" in Subia means any type of drum; by extension, it also refers to dancing with drums.
