= Trichilia magnifoliola =

Conservation status
- Vulnerable (IUCN 2.3)

Scientific classification
- Kingdom: Plantae
- Clade: Tracheophytes
- Clade: Angiosperms
- Clade: Eudicots
- Clade: Rosids
- Order: Sapindales
- Family: Meliaceae
- Genus: Trichilia
- Species: T. magnifoliola

Binomial name
- Trichilia magnifoliola Pennington

Species of flowering plant

Trichilia magnifoliola is a species of plant in the family Meliaceae. It is endemic to Brazil. It is threatened by habitat loss.
