= Trichilia ulei =

Conservation status
- Endangered (IUCN 3.1)

Scientific classification
- Kingdom: Plantae
- Clade: Tracheophytes
- Clade: Angiosperms
- Clade: Eudicots
- Clade: Rosids
- Order: Sapindales
- Family: Meliaceae
- Genus: Trichilia
- Species: T. ulei

Binomial name
- Trichilia ulei C.DC.

Tree species in the mahogany family

Trichilia ulei is a species of tree or large shrub in the mahogany family. It is endemic to Peru.

== Description ==
Trichilia ulei is a woody plant that grows 4 to 10 meters (13 to 33 ft) tall. The bark is somewhat somewhat pink to brown, but with gray patches. Younger twigs are covered in fine hairs and have lenticels of the same color. It has compound leaves that attache alternately to its twigs and measure as much as 35 centimeters. Each leaf has five or six leaflets that also attach alternately to the leaf vein. They measure up to 14.5 cm long and 3.5 cm wide and are almost oblong in shape. The leaflets are nearly hairless except for on their central veins.

The white flowers are on densely fuzzy panicle. The sepals form a rounded structure like an acorn cap with five rounded points. The petals are almost leathery in texture and also densely fuzzy on the outsides. They measure 5 millimeters long and 1.5 mm wide. The fruit is an egg shaped capsule 2 cm long and 0.7 cm in diameter.

== Taxonomy ==
Trichilia ulei was scientifically described and named by Casimir de Candolle in 1907. It is classified in the genus Trichilia within the family Meliaceae. It has no accepted subspecies or synonyms.

== Range and habitat ==
Trichilia ulei has a very small range limited to just the Department of San Martín in Peru in four documented locations. The size of its range is 41 square kilometers in the basin of the Huallaga River. It grows between 250 and 350 meters of elevation. It is part of the semideciduous dry forest of the area.
