= Trichilia lecointei =

Conservation status
- Conservation Dependent (IUCN 2.3)

Scientific classification
- Kingdom: Plantae
- Clade: Tracheophytes
- Clade: Angiosperms
- Clade: Eudicots
- Clade: Rosids
- Order: Sapindales
- Family: Meliaceae
- Genus: Trichilia
- Species: T. lecointei

Binomial name
- Trichilia lecointei Ducke

Species of flowering plant

Trichilia lecointei is a species of plant in the family Meliaceae. It is native to Pará state of northern Brazil and Guyana. It occurs in Jari Genetic Reserve and Monte Dourado National Park, in the Amazon River delta region. It is threatened by habitat loss.
