= Trichilia ornithothera =

Conservation status
- Vulnerable (IUCN 2.3)

Scientific classification
- Kingdom: Plantae
- Clade: Tracheophytes
- Clade: Angiosperms
- Clade: Eudicots
- Clade: Rosids
- Order: Sapindales
- Family: Meliaceae
- Genus: Trichilia
- Species: T. ornithothera

Binomial name
- Trichilia ornithothera J.J.De Wilde

Species of flowering plant

Trichilia ornithothera is a species of plant in the family Meliaceae. It is found in Ivory Coast and Ghana. It is threatened by habitat loss.
