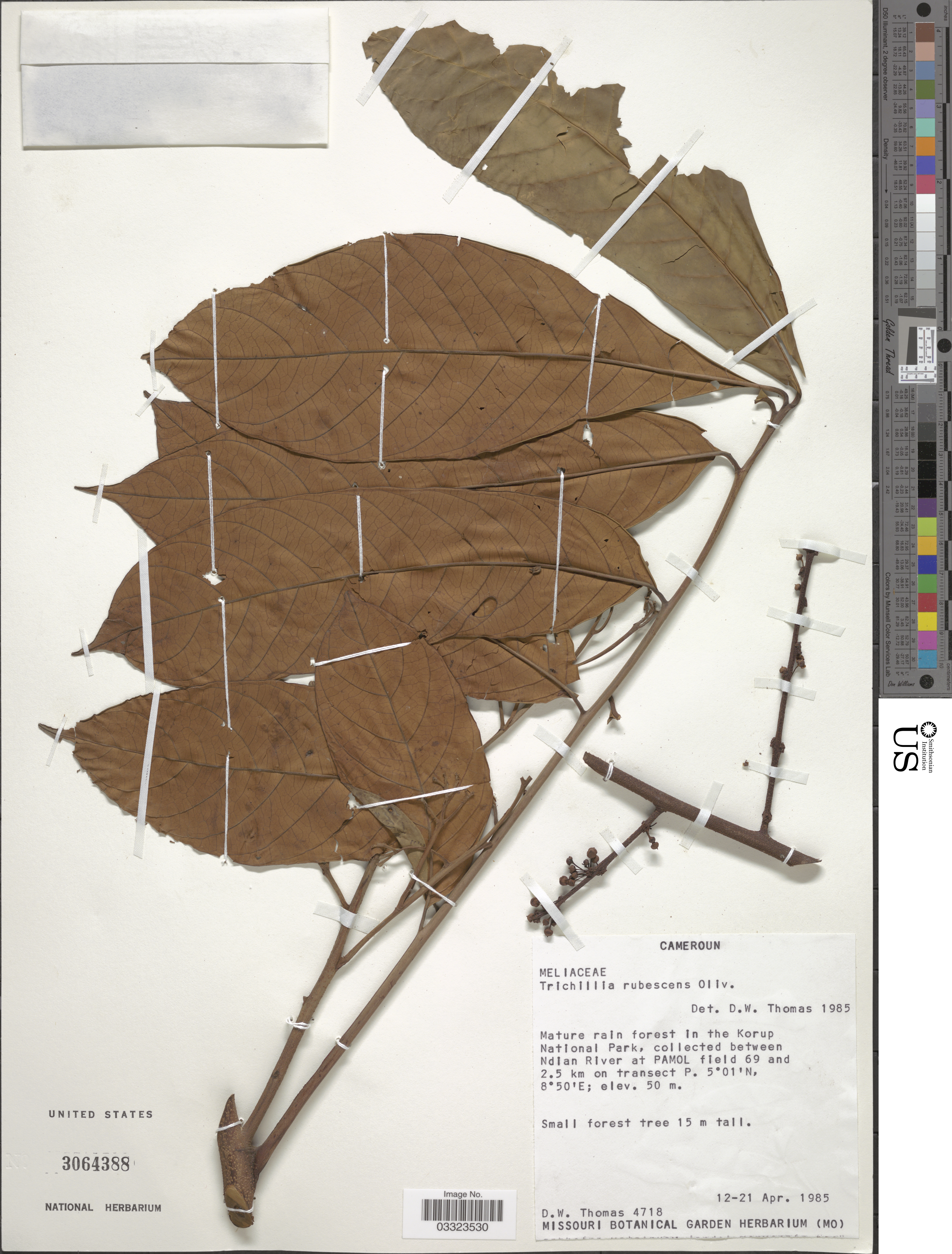

Scientific classification
- Kingdom: Plantae
- Clade: Tracheophytes
- Clade: Angiosperms
- Clade: Eudicots
- Clade: Rosids
- Order: Sapindales
- Family: Meliaceae
- Genus: Trichilia
- Species: T. rubescens

Binomial name
- Trichilia rubescens Oliv.

= Trichilia rubescens =

Species of plant

Trichilia rubescens is a species of plant in the family Meliaceae. It is native from Nigeria to northwest Tanzania.
