= Trichilia florbranca =

Conservation status
- Critically Endangered (IUCN 2.3)

Scientific classification
- Kingdom: Plantae
- Clade: Tracheophytes
- Clade: Angiosperms
- Clade: Eudicots
- Clade: Rosids
- Order: Sapindales
- Family: Meliaceae
- Genus: Trichilia
- Species: T. florbranca

Binomial name
- Trichilia florbranca T.D.Penn.

Species of flowering plant

Trichilia florbranca is a species of plant in the family Meliaceae. It is a tree endemic to southeastern Bahia state of northeastern Brazil. It is threatened by habitat loss.
