= Trichilia pittieri =

Conservation status
- Vulnerable (IUCN 2.3)

Scientific classification
- Kingdom: Plantae
- Clade: Tracheophytes
- Clade: Angiosperms
- Clade: Eudicots
- Clade: Rosids
- Order: Sapindales
- Family: Meliaceae
- Genus: Trichilia
- Species: T. pittieri

Binomial name
- Trichilia pittieri C. DC.

Species of flowering plant

Trichilia pittieri is a species of plant in the family Meliaceae. It is endemic to Costa Rica.
