= Chinchimane =

Chinchimane Chinchimani
- Settlement
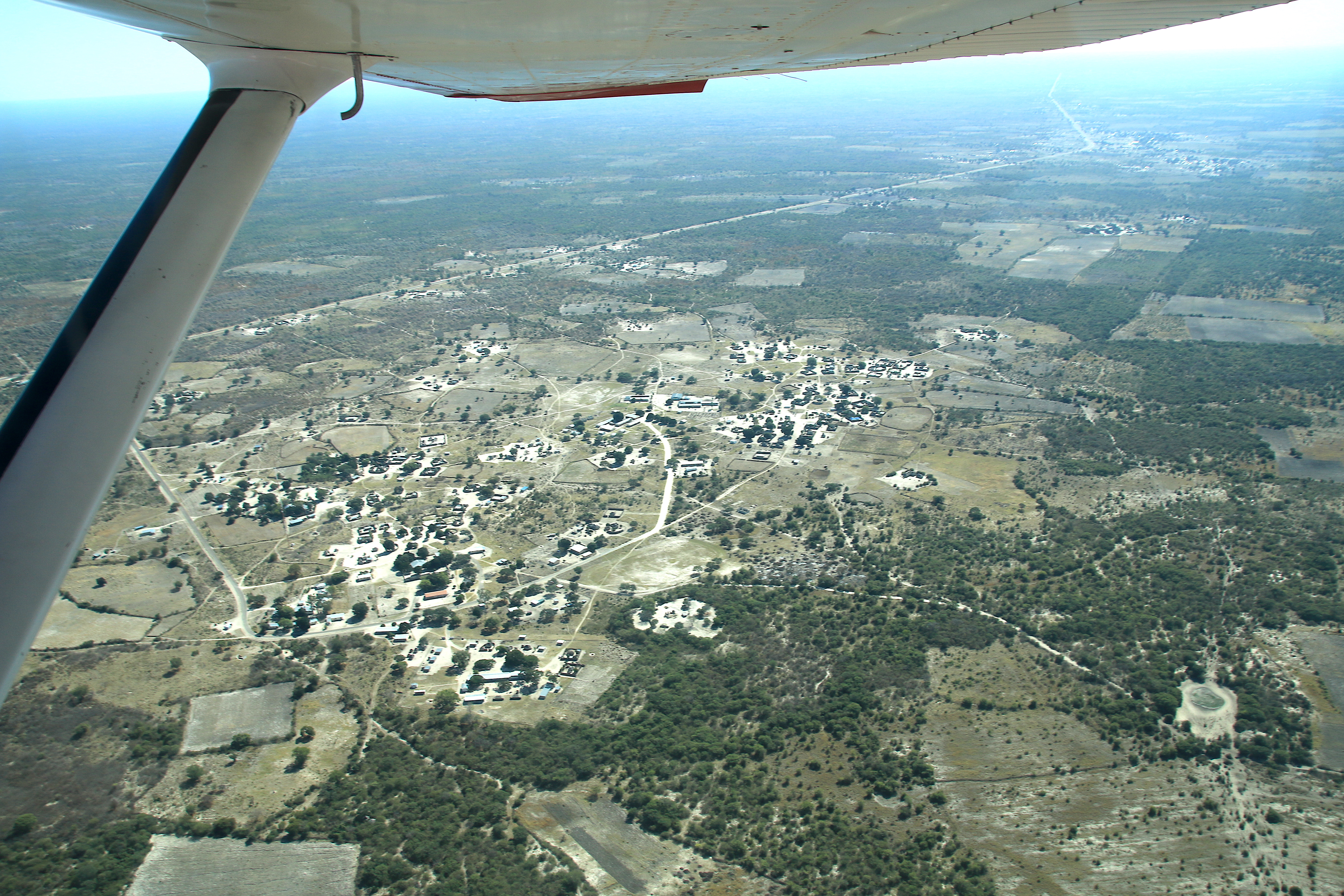
- Aerial view of Chinchimane heading north

- Location in Namibia
- Coordinates: 17°58′S 24°7′E
- Country: Namibia
- Region: Zambezi Region
- Constituency: Sibbinda Constituency
- Time zone: UTC+2 (South African Standard Time)
- Climate: BSh

Chinchimane (also: Chinchimani) is a settlement in Namibia's Caprivi Strip. It is situated approximately 70 kilometres (43 mi) southwest of the regional capital Katima Mulilo. Chinchimane belongs to the Sibbinda Constituency in Namibia's Zambezi Region.

Close to the settlement is Bamunu, one of Namibia's 79 conservancies. Bamunu is adjacent to both Mudumu National Park and Nkasa Rupara National Park.

Chinchimane is the home of the Lusata Headquarters, the traditional authority of the Mafwe tribe. Every year on the first Sunday in October, the Mafwe celebrate the Lusata Festival, a major artistic and cultural event in the Caprivi. The name Lusata is derived from the royal mace of the Mafwe people, a stick covered in ivory.

Simataa Secondary School, named after its patron the Namibian Deputy Minister of Information and Communication Technology, Stanley Simataa, is located in Chinchimane.
