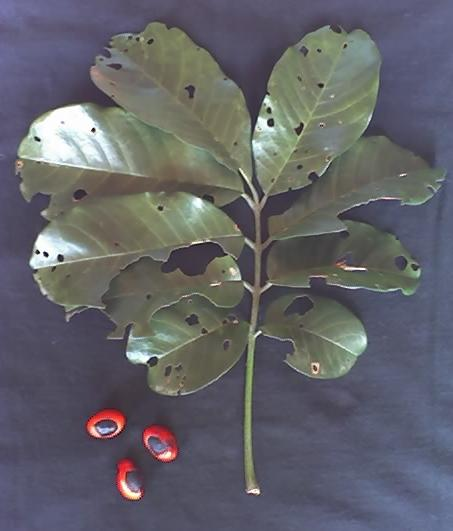
- Trichilia emetica

Scientific classification
- Kingdom: Plantae
- Clade: Embryophytes
- Clade: Tracheophytes
- Clade: Angiosperms
- Clade: Eudicots
- Clade: Rosids
- Order: Sapindales
- Family: Meliaceae
- Subfamily: Melioideae
- Genus: Trichilia; P.Browne

Species
- Many, see text

= Trichilia =

Genus of flowering plants

Trichilia is a genus of flowering plants in the mahogany family. These species are particularly diverse in sub-Saharan Africa and tropical South America.

Several species are used in folk medicine and shamanism – e.g. T. rubescens against malaria, T. tocacheana as a hallucinogen, and T. catigua in the aphrodisiac and stimulant catuaba. T. emetica wood, also known as Natal mahogany or Cape mahogany, is the traditional material of choice for Mozambique's famous psikhelekedana miniature artists. Trichilia dregeana, or forest mahogany also yields timber and is also used in carvings, traditional African musical instruments, household implements, furniture, bats and canoes.

== Taxonomy ==
The genus Trichilia was given its scientific name in 1756 by Patrick Browne. It is classified as part of Meliaceae, a family that is native to the Americas from Argentina to Mexico, Africa mainly south of the Sahara, and to the Arabian Peninsula. The genus has 19 synonyms.

Table of Synonyms
Name	Year
Acanthotrichilia (Urb.) O.F.Cook & G.N.Collins	1903
Acrilia Griseb.	1859
Barbilus P.Browne	1756
Barbylus Juss.	1789
Barola Adans.	1763 (nom. illeg.)
Burseranthe Rizzini	1974
Elcaja Forssk.	1775
Geniostephanus Fenzl	1844
Heynichia Kunth	1844
Mafureira Bertol.	1850
Moschoxylum A.Juss.	1830
Odontandra Willd. ex Schult.	1819
Odontosiphon M.Roem.	1846
Pholacilia Griseb.	1859
Portesia Cav.	1789
Rochetia Delile	1846
Symphytosiphon Harms	1896
Torpesia M.Roem.	1846
Ailantopsis Gagnep.	1944

According to Plants of the World Online there are 109 accepted species:

- Trichilia acuminata (Humb. & Bonpl. ex Schult.) C.DC.
- Trichilia adolfi Harms
- Trichilia amapaensis T.D.Penn.
- Trichilia americana (Sessé & Moc.) T.D.Penn.
- Trichilia appendiculata (Triana & Planch.) C.DC.
- Trichilia aquifolia P.Wilson
- Trichilia arenaria T.B.Flores & V.C.Souza
- Trichilia areolata T.D.Penn.
- Trichilia blanchetii C.DC.
- Trichilia breviflora S.F.Blake & Standl.
- Trichilia bullata T.D.Penn.
- Trichilia capitata Klotzsch
- Trichilia casarettoi C.DC.
- Trichilia catigua A.Juss.
- Trichilia cauliflora J.-F.Leroy & Lescot
- Trichilia chirriactensis (Standl. & Steyerm.) T.D.Penn.
- Trichilia cipo (A.Juss.) C.DC.
- Trichilia claussenii C.DC.
- Trichilia congesta T.D.Penn.
- Trichilia dazae T.D.Penn.
- Trichilia discolor A.Juss.
- Trichilia djalonis A.Chev.
- Trichilia dregeana Sond.
- Trichilia elegans A.Juss.
- Trichilia elsae Harms
- Trichilia emarginata (Turcz.) C.DC.
- Trichilia emetica Vahl
- Trichilia erythrocarpa Lundell
- Trichilia euneura C.DC.
- Trichilia fasciculata T.D.Penn.
- Trichilia florbranca T.D.Penn.
- Trichilia gamopetala T.D.Penn.
- Trichilia gilgiana Harms
- Trichilia gilletii De Wild.
- Trichilia glabra L.
- Trichilia grandifolia Oliv.
- Trichilia havanensis Jacq.
- Trichilia hirta L.
- Trichilia hispida T.D.Penn.
- Trichilia humblotii Harms
- Trichilia inaequilatera T.D.Penn.
- Trichilia laxipaniculata Cuatrec.
- Trichilia lecointei Ducke
- Trichilia lepidota Mart.
- Trichilia lovettii Cheek
- Trichilia magnifoliola T.D.Penn.
- Trichilia martiana C.DC.
- Trichilia martineaui Aubrév. & Pellegr.
- Trichilia mazanensis J.F.Macbr.
- Trichilia megalantha Harms
- Trichilia micrantha Benth.
- Trichilia micropetala T.D.Penn.
- Trichilia minima T.D.Penn.
- Trichilia minutiflora Standl.
- Trichilia monacantha Urb.
- Trichilia monadelpha (Thonn.) J.J.de Wilde
- Trichilia moschata Sw.
- Trichilia mucronata (Cav.) Forsyth f.
- Trichilia multifoliola C.DC.
- Trichilia obovata W.Palacios
- Trichilia oligantha C.DC.
- Trichilia ornithothera J.J.de Wilde
- Trichilia pachypoda (Rusby) C.DC. ex Harms
- Trichilia pallens C.DC.
- Trichilia pallida Sw.
- Trichilia petenensis Lundell
- Trichilia pittieri C.DC.
- Trichilia pleeana (A.Juss.) C.DC.
- Trichilia poeppigii C.DC.
- Trichilia prieureana A.Juss.
- Trichilia primogenita W.Palacios
- Trichilia pseudostipularis (A.Juss.) C.DC.
- Trichilia pugana V.W.Steinm. & Ram.-Amezcua
- Trichilia pungens Urb.
- Trichilia quadrijuga Kunth
- Trichilia quadrivalvis C.DC.
- Trichilia ramalhoi Rizzini
- Trichilia reticulata P.Wilson
- Trichilia retusa Oliv.
- Trichilia reynelii T.D.Penn.
- Trichilia rubescens Oliv.
- Trichilia rubra C.DC.
- Trichilia sambiranensis Callm. & Phillipson
- Trichilia schomburgkii C.DC.
- Trichilia septentrionalis C.DC.
- Trichilia silvatica C.DC.
- Trichilia singularis C.DC.
- Trichilia solitudinis Harms
- Trichilia stellatotomentosa Kuntze
- Trichilia stenophylla Urb. & Ekman
- Trichilia stipitata T.D.Penn.
- Trichilia surinamensis (Miq.) C.DC.
- Trichilia surumuensis C.DC.
- Trichilia taubertiana Harms
- Trichilia tenuifructa T.D.Penn.
- Trichilia tessmannii Harms
- Trichilia tetrapetala C.DC.
- Trichilia tomentosa Kunth
- Trichilia trachyantha (Griseb.) C.DC.
- Trichilia triacantha Urb.
- Trichilia trifolia L.
- Trichilia trimera T.D.Penn.
- Trichilia tsaratananensis Lescot
- Trichilia tuberculata (Triana & Planch.) C.DC.
- Trichilia ulei C.DC.
- Trichilia vestigialis T.D.Penn.
- Trichilia watorikensis T.D.Penn.
- Trichilia welwitschii C.DC.
- Trichilia zewaldae J.J.de Wilde
