= Kabbe South =

Electoral constituency in Namibia's Zambezi Region

- Constituency
- Region: Zambezi Region
- Population: 142,373
- Major settlements: Nakabolelwa
- Area: 1,258 km²

Current constituency

Kabbe South constituency (red) in the Zambezi Region

Kabbe South is a constituency in Namibia's Zambezi Region. The administrative centre of the constituency is the settlement of Nakabolelwa, situated 79 kilometres south-east of the region's capital, Katima Mulilo. It has a population of 142,373 and covers an area of 1,258 km², resulting in a population density of approximately 9.021/km².

Kabbe South Constituency was created in August 2013 from the eastern part of the former Kabbe Constituency, following a recommendation of the Fourth Delimitation Commission of Namibia to split Kabbe into a southern and a northern part in preparation for the 2014 general election

== Politics ==
The 2015 regional election was won by Musialela John Likando (SWAPO) with 1,189 votes, followed by Bernard Kamwi Shamwazi of the Democratic Turnhalle Alliance (DTA) with 46 votes.

As of 2020, the constituency had 3,751 registered voters. Musialela John Likando (SWAPO) was re-elected in the 2020 regional election, again winning over 90% of the public vote, making him Councillor of Kabbe South Constituency.

== See also ==
- Administrative divisions of Namibia
- Ikaba area
