= Kavimba =

Coordinates: 17°59′14″S 24°38′48″E

Location of Kavimba

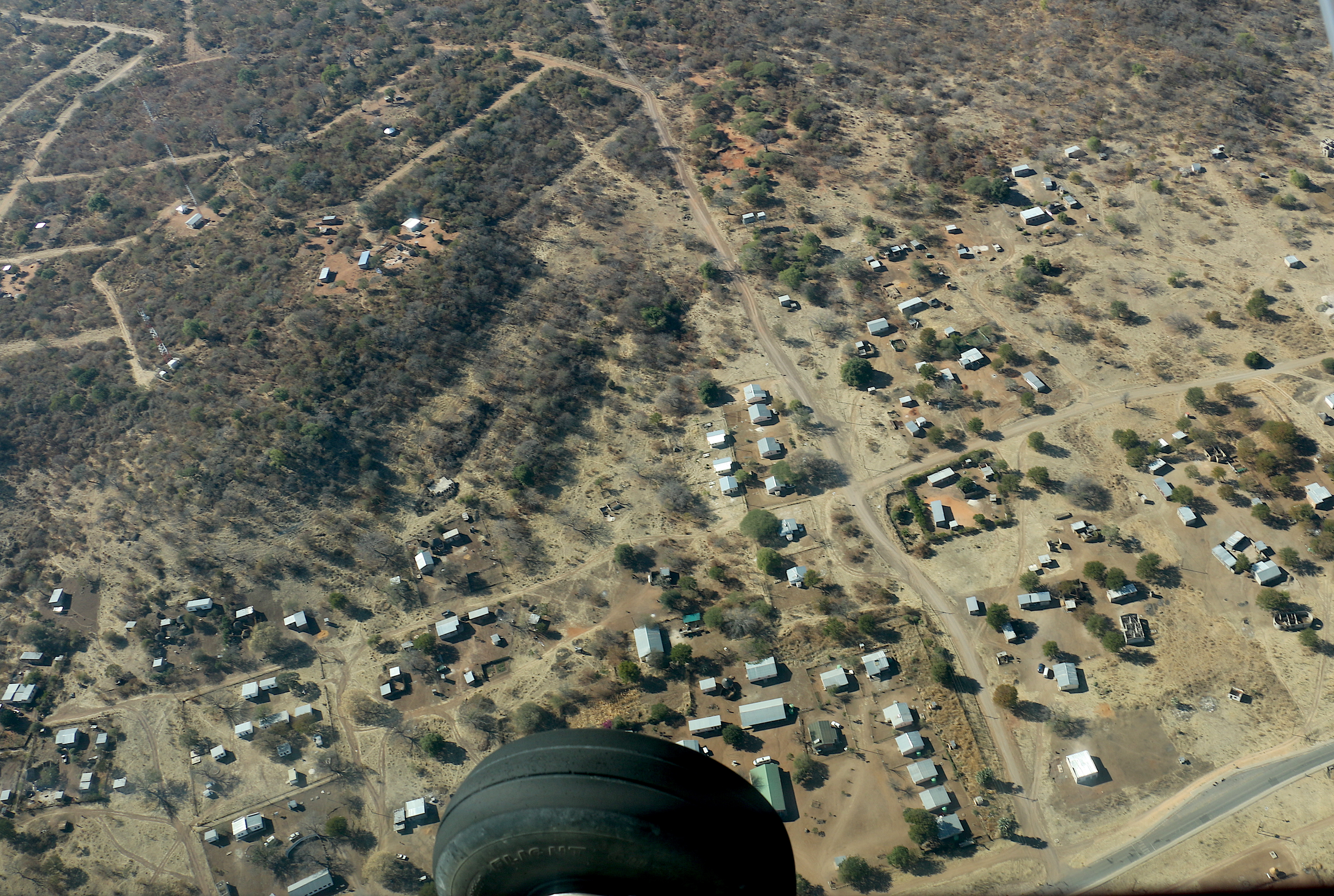
Aerial view of Kavimba (2017)

Kavimba is a village in North-West District of Botswana. It is located in the eastern part of the district, which before 2001 formed Chobe District, and has a primary school and no secondary school . The population was 567 in 2022 census.
