= Luhonono =

Luhonono Schuckmannsburg
- Settlement
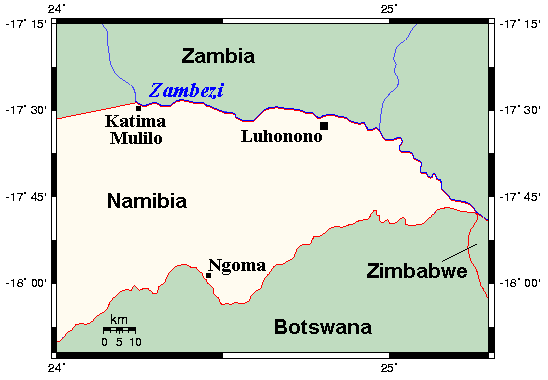
- Location in Caprivi

- Location in Namibia
- Coordinates: 17°32′42″S 24°50′52″E
- Country: Namibia
- Region: Zambezi Region
- Constituency: Kabbe North
- Elevation: 2,795 ft (852 m)
- Time zone: UTC+2 (South African Standard Time)
- Climate: BSh

Luhonono, until 2013 Schuckmannsburg, is a settlement in the Caprivi Strip in northeastern Namibia with a population of about 800. It belongs to the Kabbe North electoral constituency of the Zambezi Region. During the time of German colonialism, it was the capital of the Caprivi Strip.

== Geography ==
Luhonono lies at the far eastern end of the Caprivi Strip, about 1 km south of the river Zambezi and about 65 kilometres (40 mi) east of Katima Mulilo, which is today the region's administrative seat, a role once performed by Schuckmannsburg when Namibia was a German colony.

Owing to the way that Africa was carved up by the European powers in the 19th century in the "Scramble for Africa", Luhonono lies right near several other countries, Zambia just to the north, Botswana about 30 kilometres (19 mi) to the south and Zimbabwe about 50 kilometres (31 mi) to the east. Angola is also only about 80 kilometres (50 mi) to the west.

== History ==
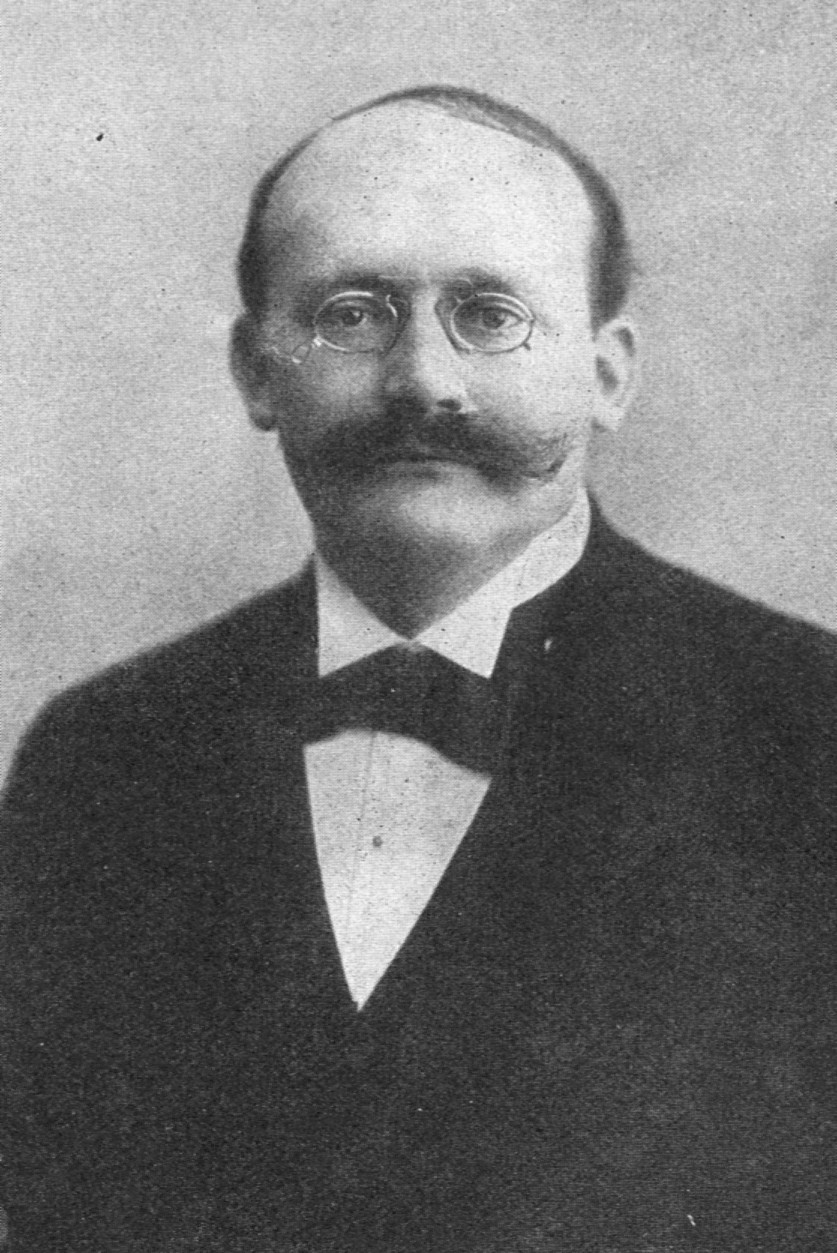
Bruno von Schuckmann

The settlement was originally named Luhonono, after the Luhonono tree (Terminalia sericea), which is native to the area. This tree is commonly known as Clusterleaf in English, Vaalboom in Afrikaans, and Muhonono in Silozi.

The settlement was founded under the name Schuckmannsburg on 7 February 1909 by Captain Kurt Streitwolf as "Imperial Residence in the Caprivi Strip". Its namesake was the then-governor of German South West Africa, Bruno von Schuckmann. The purpose of founding this place in such a remote area was to visibly take ownership, on the colonial administration's behalf, of the Caprivi Strip, which had formally been part of German Southwest Africa since 1890. The exact location was chosen because it was directly opposite Mwandi, a North Rhodesian settlement under British rule, and infrastructure such as a post office and a hospital, was readily available there. The Imperial Resident Streitwolf, who had at his command three German junior officers as well as a few Askaris as assistant policemen, put up buildings, mapped the area, and consolidated the administration.

In 1911, Victor von Frankenberg und Proschlitz took over the Resident's post, thereafter known, however, as District Chief. In late September 1914, he surrendered Schuckmannsburg without a fight to an advancing detachment of the British South Africa Police from Southern Rhodesia which was cooperating with a detachment of the Northern Rhodesia Police (NRP). Captain Eason then became the new administrator. Lieutenant O'Sullevan of the NRP said that the Caprivi had

the largest, most vindictive, and venomous mosquitoes I have seen ... in the wet season it is a swamp and unhealthy; in the dry weather the heat is terrific, whilst the sand is deep and uncomfortable to walk in

German rule ended in Southwest Africa (Namibia) as Germany was stripped of its colonies by the Treaty of Versailles after the end of the First World War in 1918. The South Africans took over the administrative centre at Schuckmannsburg but decided to abandon the place because of the annual heavy flooding of the area. Thus Schuckmannsburg lost its political importance when on 28 January 1935 Katima Mulilo took its administrative functions. Because of a shortage of building material in Katima Mulilo – no shops and no buildings were present there at that time – many buildings were taken apart so that the bricks could be reused in the new regional seat.

== Luhonono today ==
The settlement nowadays consists of wooden cabins and a few less sturdy buildings. The only intact relic of German colonial time is a little brick house with a floor area of about 12 m^{2} built in 1909, the only brick building not dismantled for building material when the regional offices were moved to Katima Mulilo. On 9 August 2013, the Namibian government renamed Schuckmannsburg Luhonono.

The D3508, in 2021 renamed Brendan Simbwaye Road, connects Luhonono to Isize and Namalubi.

== Literature ==
- Rainer D.K. Bruchmann: Schuckmannsburg, Kuiseb-Verlag, Windhuk 1997, ISBN 99916-703-7-8
- Edward Paice: Tip and Run: the untold tragedy of the Great War in Africa, 2007, ISBN 0-297-84709-0, page 33
