= Kabbe North =

Electoral constituency in Namibia's Zambezi Region

- Constituency
- Region: Zambezi Region
- Population: 14,518
- Major settlements: Kabbe
- Area: 1,183 km²

Current constituency

Kabbe North constituency (red) in the Zambezi Region

Kabbe North is a constituency in Namibia's Zambezi Region. The administrative centre of the constituency is the settlement of Kabbe, situated 53 kilometres south-east of the region's capital, Katima Mulilo. It had a population of 14,518 in 2011 and 3,916 registered voters in 2020.

Kabbe North covers an area of 1,183 km^{2}. The constituency has three clinics and 11 schools. The constituency was created in August 2013 from the north-western part of Kabbe Constituency, following the Fourth Delimitation Commission of Namibia's recommendation to split Kabbe into a northern and a southern part in preparation for the 2014 general election.

Luhonono belongs to Kabbe North constituency.

== Politics ==
The 2015 regional election was won by Peter Mwala (SWAPO) with 1,487 votes, followed by Calvin Ngandi Ngandi of the Rally for Democracy and Progress (RDP) with 63 votes. The 2020 regional election was also won by SWAPO. Its candidate Bernard Kamwi Sisamu became councillor with 1,116 votes, ahead of Joseph Likando Matali of the Independent Patriots for Change (IPC, an opposition party formed in August 2020) with 292 votes and Cooks Mukuwa Muyoba of the Popular Democratic Movement (PDM) with 136 votes.

== See also ==
- Administrative divisions of Namibia
