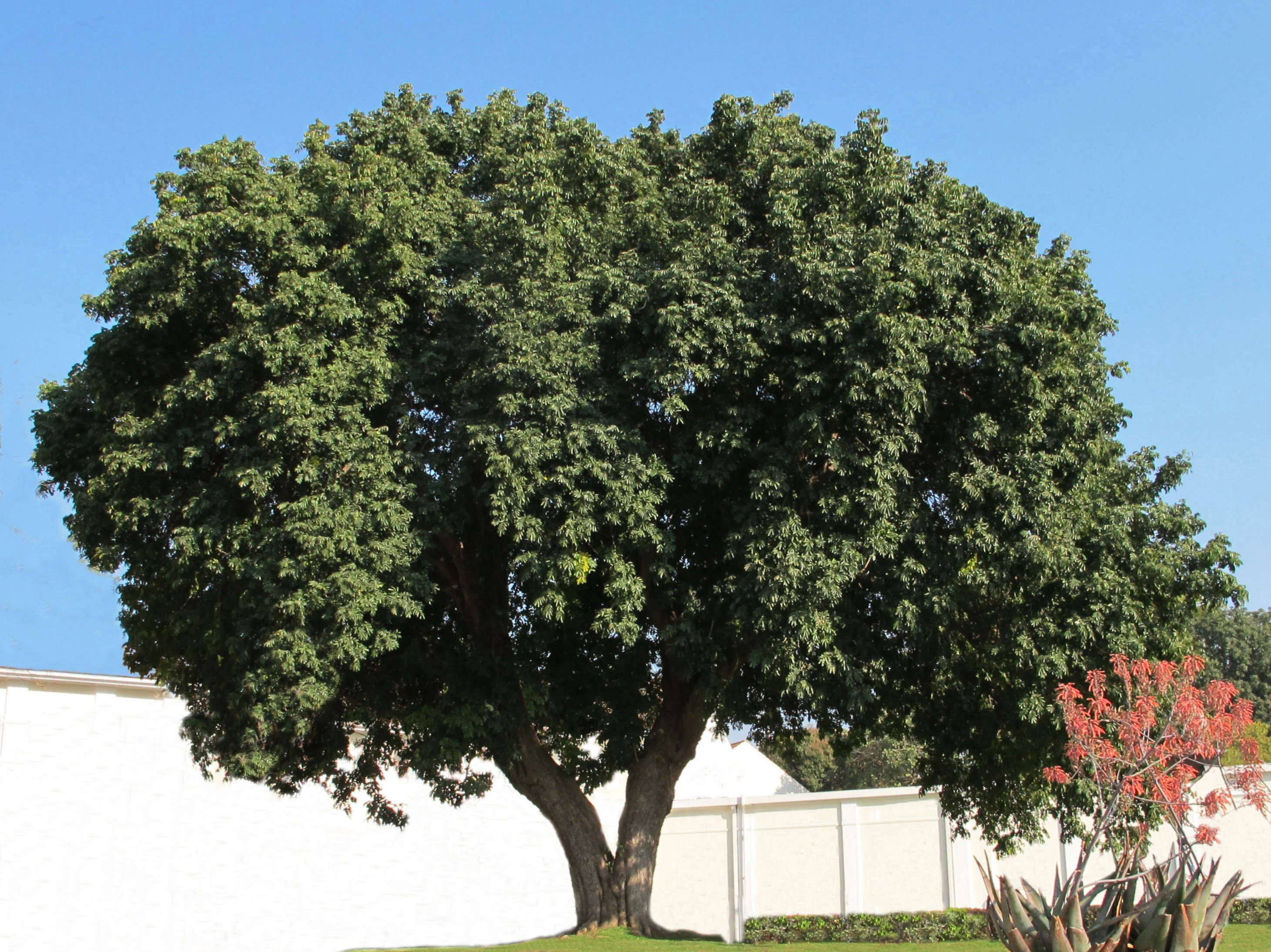

Scientific classification
- Kingdom: Plantae
- Clade: Tracheophytes
- Clade: Angiosperms
- Clade: Eudicots
- Clade: Rosids
- Order: Sapindales
- Family: Meliaceae
- Genus: Trichilia
- Species: T. emetica

Binomial name
- Trichilia emetica Vahl.

= Trichilia emetica =

Species of tree

Trichilia emetica is a tree in the family Meliaceae, commonly known as the Natal mahogany. It is an evergreen tree, with handsome glossy dark green leaves and a wide spreading crown. Its sweet-scented flowers attract bees and birds.

== Subspecies ==
Trichilia emetica has two subspecies, emetica and suberosa. T. emetica ssp. emetica is restricted to southern Africa, while suberosa occur northwards of the Zambezi River.

== Distribution ==
These trees are found in riverine vegetation and open woodland from KwaZulu-Natal Province of South Africa to Tropical Africa.

== Description ==
Trichilia emetica is an evergreen, medium to large tree, up to 25 m high, with separate male and female plants. It has a dense, spreading crown. Leaflets are dark glossy green above, tips more or less rounded or broadly pointed, lower surface sparsely to densely hairy with principal side veins in 11–18 closely spaced pairs.

Flowers are creamy green and sweetly scented. Trichilia emetica flowers in August to November.

The fruit is a dehiscent capsule, 18–25 mm in diameter, sharply differentiated from a 5–10 mm long neck. The seeds are black and almost completely enveloped by a bright red aril. The fruit is an emetic, hence the taxonomic name of the plant.

== Gallery ==
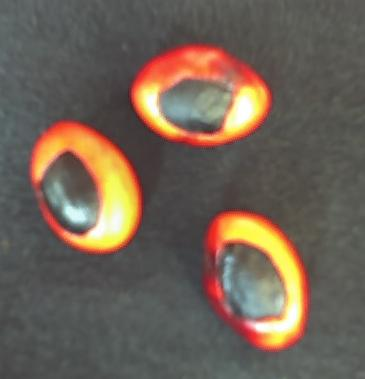
Seeds

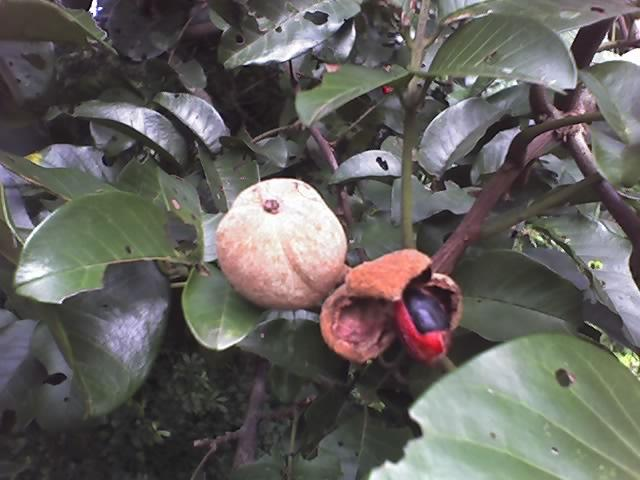
Fruit and seed

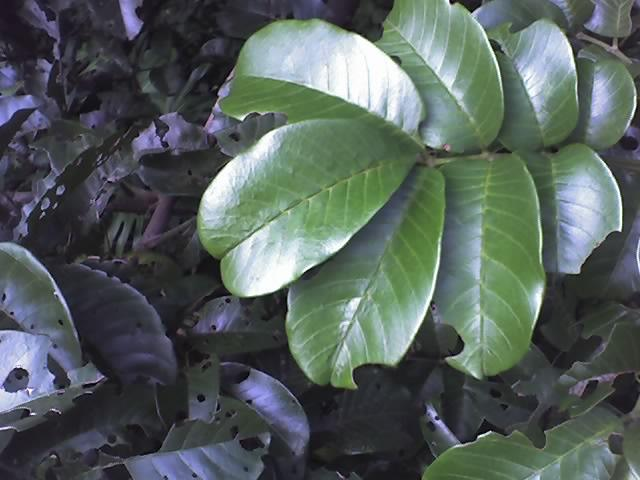
Leaves

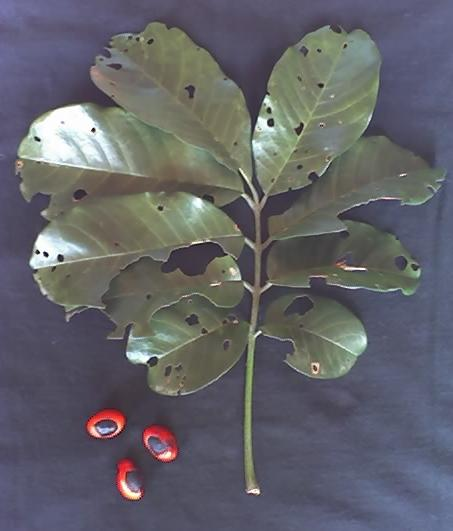
Seeds and compound leaf (showing insect damage)
