= Kongola =

- Settlement
- Location in Namibia
- Coordinates: 17°48′S 23°23′E
- Country: Namibia
- Region: Zambezi Region
- Constituency: Kongola Constituency
- Time zone: UTC+2 (South African Standard Time)
- Climate: BSh

Kongola is a settlement in Namibia's Zambezi Region, located 112 kilometres southwest of the region's capital, Katima Mulilo. It serves as the administrative centre of the Kongola Constituency.

The name "Kongola" is from Silozi, meaning "to gather," as in collecting everything like a net, or "to summon people to assemble."
