= Kongola Constituency =

Electoral constituency in Namibia

Coordinates: 17°58′S 23°17′E

Kongola constituency (red) in the Zambezi Region

Kongola Constituency is an electoral constituency in Namibia's Zambezi Region, with the Kongola settlement serving as its administrative centre. Covering an area of 5,174 km², it is the largest constituency in the region by area. As of 2023, Kongola has a population of 12,069, resulting in a population density of 2.33 per km².

The name "Kongola" is derived from Silozi, meaning "to gather" (like a net collecting everything) or "to bring people together". The Kwando River flows through the constituency. Parts of Bwabwata National Park and Mayuni Conservancy fall within Kongola constituency.

== People ==
The area is primarily inhabited by members of the Mafwe and Mashi tribes, governed by two traditional authorities. Additionally, the western part of the constituency includes part of the Bwabwata National Park, home to about 1,900 Khwe San people.

== Politics ==
In the 2004 regional election, SWAPO candidate Muneti Moffat Sileze received 955 of the 2,147 votes cast and became councillor.

In the 2015 regional election, David Siyayo Muluti (SWAPO) won with 1,227 votes, followed by Justings Musupi Kutembeka (RDP) with 495 votes.

As of 2020, the constituency had 5,565 registered voters. The 2020 regional election was won by Bennety Likulela Busihu, an independent candidate, who received 1,236 votes and became councillor. SWAPO's Muluti came second with 538 votes, followed by Albius Silwabubi Walubita of the Popular Democratic Movement (PDM) with 384 votes and Adams Manyando of the Independent Patriots for Change (IPC, an opposition party formed in August 2020) with 333 votes.
