= Katima Mulilo Rural =

Electoral constituency in Namibia's Zambezi Region

Coordinates: 17°30′S 24°17′E

- Constituency
- Katima Mulilo Rural constituency (red) in the Zambezi Region
- Region: Zambezi Region
- Population: 16,399 (2011)
- Major settlements: Bukalo, Ngoma
- Area: 1,935 km^{2} (747 sq mi)

Current constituency
- Created: 1998

Katima Mulilo Rural is one of the eight constituencies in Namibia's Zambezi Region. Its administrative centre is located in Bukalo. The constituency covers an area of 1,935 km^{2} (747 sq mi) and had a population of 16,399 in 2011, making it the fourth largest constituency in the region. There is a health centre in Bukalo and clinics in Ngoma, Muyako, and Ibbu.

Katima Mulilo Rural was created in 1998. Following a recommendation of the Second Delimitation Commission of Namibia, and in preparation for the 1998 general election, the old Katima Mulilo Constituency was split into Katima Mulilo Urban and Katima Mulilo Rural.

== Politics ==
=== Regional elections ===
In the 2004 regional election SWAPO candidate Leonard Mwilima received 2,709 of the 3,677 votes cast.

The 2015 regional election was won by Wardens Matengu Simushi (SWAPO) with 1,662 votes, followed by Daniel Sinyemba Sankwasa of the Rally for Democracy and Progress (RDP) with 182 votes and Annaberia Nswahu Maswahu of the Democratic Turnhalle Alliance (DTA) with 149 votes. Simushi was reelected in the 2020 regional election, obtaining 1,290 votes and he serves as the Katima Mulilo Rural Constituency Councillor. The opposition candidates Sankwasa, now Popular Democratic Movement (PDM, the new name of the DTA), and Innocent Mahoto from the Independent Patriots for Change (IPC, an opposition party formed in August 2020) received 352 and 303 votes, respectively.

=== National elections ===
In the 2004 presidential election, Katima Mulilo Rural voted overwhelmingly for Hifikepunye Pohamba (SWAPO). Pohamba won with 3776 (72%) votes, followed by Ben Ulenga of the Congress of Democrats, who received 480 (9%) votes, Henk Mudge of the Republican Party who received 466 (9%) votes and Katuutire Kaura of the Democratic Turnhalle Alliance, who received 386 (7.5%) votes.
