= Kabbe Constituency =

Zambezi Region Constituencies since 2013. Kabbe occupied the area of today's Kabbe North (7) and Kabbe South (6).

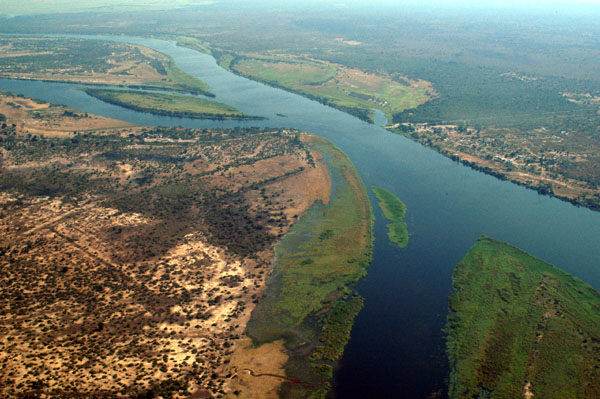
Zambezi River at the junction of Namibia (top left), Zambia (top), Zimbabwe (bottom right) and Botswana (bottom left)

Kabbe was a constituency in the Zambezi Region of Namibia. Most of the area is situated in the flood area of the Zambezi River. It contained the former German colonial residence of Schuckmannsburg (today Luhonono), as well as several other villages. Its population in 2010 was 14,979.

Following a recommendation of the Fourth Delimitation Commission of Namibia, and in preparation of the 2014 general election, the constituency was split into Kabbe South and Kabbe North.

== Politics ==
Kabbe is traditionally a stronghold of the South West Africa People's Organization (SWAPO) party. In the 2004 regional election SWAPO candidate Peter Mwala Mwala received 3,095 of the 3,144 votes cast. In the presidential election the same year, Kabbe voted overwhelmingly for Hifikepunye Pohamba of SWAPO. Pohamba won with 3764 (96%) votes, with Ben Ulenga of the Congress of Democrats receiving 82 (2%) of the constituency's votes.
