= Kuhane language =

Bantu language in Southern Africa

Kuhane
- Chikuhane / Chisubia
- Native to: Namibia 34,000 Botswana 7,900 Zambia 2,900
- Ethnicity: Baikuhane / Basubia
- Native speakers: 45,000
- Language family: Niger–Congo?: Atlantic–Congo; Benue–Congo; Southern Bantoid; Bantu; Botatwe; Subia; Kuhane

Language codes
- ISO 639-3: sbs
- Glottolog: subi1246
- Guthrie code: K.42 (K.401)
- ELP: Subiya

- Person: Muikuhane
- People: Baikuhane
- Language: Chikuhane

A Subiya, or Kuhane, speaker speaking the language with an English introduction, recorded in Namibia.

The Kuhane language is a Bantu language spoken in Southern Africa. Also known as Ikuhane, Subia or Subiya, it is spoken by the Ikuhane people in Namibia, Botswana and Zambia.

== History ==
The language is called Chikuhane by native speakers, and gets its name from the second known Subia King, Ikuhane, who reigned from 1575 – 1600. Under his leadership, the people migrated southwards and settled along the Cuando River which is also named the Ikuhane River in his honour. A single Ikuhane person is referred to as Muikuhane while many Ikuhane people are referred to as Baikuhane. The prefix Mu- is singular and the prefix Ba- is plural.

However, Baikuhane are popularly known today as the Subia people. The exonym Subia came from neighbouring people and it is derived from the word ‘subila’ which means light in reference to their light skin complexion. A single Subia person is referred to as Musubia while many Subia people are referred to as Basubia or Masubia. The language is called Chisubia.

== Phonology ==
=== Consonants ===
		Bilabial			Labio- dental		Alveolar		Post-alv./ Palatal			Velar		Glottal		
		plain	lab.	pal.	plain	lab.	plain	lab.	plain	lab.	pal.	plain	lab.	plain	lab.	pal.
Nasal		m	mʷ	mʲ	(ɱ)		n	nʷ	ɲ			ŋ				
Plosive/ Affricate	voiceless	p	pʷ				t	tʷ	t͡ʃ			k	kʷ			
Plosive/ Affricate	voiced	b	bʷ				d	dʷ	d͡ʒ	d͡ʒʷ		ɡ	ɡʷ			
Fricative	voiceless				f	fʷ	s	sʷ	ʃ					h	hʷ	hʲ
Fricative	voiced	β	βʷ	βʲ	v	vʷ	z	zʷ								
Approximant								(lʷ)	j				w			
Flap									ɭ̆	ɭ̆ʷ	ɭ̆ʲ					

- Prenasal stop and fricative sounds are also present, when stop and fricative sounds are preceded by nasal consonants.
- /t, tʷ/ may also be heard as dental [t̪, t̪ʷ] in free variation.
- /m/ is heard as [ɱ] when preceding a labiodental fricative /f, v/ within nasal compounds.
- /ɭ̆ʷ/ may also be heard as alveolar [lʷ] in free variation.

=== Vowels ===
	Front	Central	Back
High	i		u
Mid	ɛ		ɔ
Low		a	

== Subia text ==
Chisubia: Kakuli Ileza ava saki ahulu inkanda, mane avahi Mwanakwe yenke, ili kuti yense yo zumina Kwakwe keta afwe kono kave nivuhalo vusamani. Johani 3:16

English: For God so loved the world that He gave His only begotten Son, that whoever believes in Him should not perish but have everlasting life. John 3:16
