= Zambezi Region =

Region in Namibia

Coordinates: 17°30′S 24°16′E

- Region
- Location of the Zambezi Region in Namibia
- Country: Namibia
- Seat: Katima Mulilo

Government
  - Governor: Dorothy Kabula

Area
  - Total: 14,785 km^{2} (5,709 sq mi)

Population (2023 census)
  - Total: 142,373
  - Density: 9.7/km^{2} (25/sq mi)
- Time zone: UTC+2 (CAT)
- HDI (2017): 0.628 medium · 8th

The Zambezi Region, known as the Caprivi Region until 2013, is one of Namibia's fourteen regions, situated in the north-eastern part of the country along the Zambezi River. Located entirely in the Caprivi Strip, the region's capital is Katima Mulilo. The Katima Mulilo Airport is 18 kilometres south-west of the town, while the village of Bukalo is located 43 kilometres south-east of Katima Mulilo. The region has eight electoral constituencies and a population of 142,373 according to the 2023 census.

== Politics ==
=== Constituencies ===
Zambezi constituencies (2014)

The region comprises eight electoral constituencies:

- Judea Lyaboloma (created 2013)
- Kabbe North (created 2013)
- Kabbe South (created 2013)
- Katima Mulilo Rural
- Katima Mulilo Urban
- Kongola
- Linyanti
- Sibbinda

=== Regional elections ===
Electorally, Zambezi is consistently dominated by the South West Africa People's Organization (SWAPO). In the 2004 regional election for the National Assembly of Namibia, SWAPO won all constituencies, and mostly by a landslide.

In the 2015 regional elections SWAPO won in all eight constituencies and obtained 77.5% of all votes (2010: 80%). In the 2020 regional election SWAPO still had the vast majority of votes (45.4%) but lost four of the eight constituencies, three to independent candidates and one to the Independent Patriots for Change (IPC), an opposition party formed in August 2020.

=== Governors ===
- Lawrence Sampofu (2015–2025)
- Dorothy Kabula (July 2025–)

== Geography ==
The Zambezi Region can be classified as a tropical area, with high temperatures and high rainfall during the December-to-March rainy season, making it the wettest region in Namibia. The terrain mostly consists of swamps, floodplains, wetlands and woodland.

In addition to the Zambezi River, the region also holds the Kwando River, which marks the border with Botswana. Tributaries include the Linyanti and the Chobe. The Kwando meets the Zambezi in the far east of the region.

=== Populated places ===
Besides the capital Katima Mulilo, which has town status, and the self-governed village Bukalo, there are numerous settlements in the region, including:

- Chinchimane
- Ibbu
- Kongola
- Lisikili
- Luhonono
- Nakabolelwa
- Ngoma
- Sangwali
- Sibbinda

=== Borders ===
The Zambezi Region is almost entirely bordered by other countries. Its only domestic border is with the Kavango East Region in the west.

- In the northwest, it borders the Cuando Cubango Province of Angola.
- In the north, it borders the Western Province of Zambia.
- In the south, it borders the North-West District of Botswana.

The Namibia-Zambia-Botswana tripoint lies less than 100 metres from the Zimbabwe border, causing Namibia sometimes to be thought to border Zimbabwe.

=== Flora and fauna ===
The Zambezi Region is home to 450 animal species, including elephants, making the Zambezi Region a popular spot for game-watching. Wildlife is safeguarded by several national parks: Bwabwata National Park, Nkasa Rupara National Park (formerly Mamili National Park), and Mudumu National Park. Animals move freely across the unmarked border into Botswana, where Chobe National Park is situated. The region is also renowned for bird-watching, hosting almost 70 percent of Namibia's recorded bird species.

=== Population ===
The Zambezi Region's population of 142,373 constitutes approximately 4.71% of Namibia's total population. The region is predominantly inhabited by subsistence farmers who rely on the Zambezi, Kwando, Linyanti, and Chobe Rivers for their livelihoods.

The Lozi people are a Bantu-speaking ethnic group native to southern Africa. They consist of several tribes, including the Bafwe, Bambukushu, Basubia, Batotela, and Bayeyi, each with its own dialect and traditional authority. These tribes share the same Lozi culture and traditions. Silozi serves as the standard language that unifies them and is widely used in educational materials, media such as television and radio, and government communications. Additionally, Silozi plays a crucial role in preserving and promoting cultural heritage, serving as a common medium for cultural practices and ceremonies.

Additionally, there is a population of San, specifically the Khwe people, residing in Bwabwata in the western part of the region.

== Economy and infrastructure ==
According to the 2012 Namibia Labour Force Survey, unemployment in the Zambezi Region is 28.0%. Zambezi has 102 schools with a total of 39,808 pupils.

=== Tourism ===
Bwabwata National Park is 6,100 square kilometres (2,400 sq mi) and extends for about 180 km (110 mi) from the Kavango River in the west to the Kwando River in the east. Deciduous woodlands are dominated by trees such as wild seringa, copalwood and Zambezi teak. While the park is sanctuary to 35 large and numerous small game species, visitors are not likely to see many of these animals, as vehicles are restricted to the road between Kavango and Eastern Zambezi. Animals likely to be seen are elephant, roan and kudu. Buffalo occur towards the west. As many as 339 bird species have been recorded in the west of the Zambezi Region.

The wild and little visited Nkasa Rupara National Park (formerly Mamili National Park) is Namibia's equivalent of the Okavango Delta, a watery wonderland of wildlife rich islands, river channels and wetlands. The focal points of the 320 km^{2} (120 sq mi) national park are Nkasa and Lupala, two large islands in the Kwando/Linyati river. During the dry season the islands can be reached by road but after the rains 80% of the area becomes flooded, cutting them off from the mainland.

Mudumu National Park is a vast 1,000 km^{2} (390 sq mi) expanse of dense savannah and mopane woodland with the Kwando River at its western border. The park is home to small populations of sitatunga and red lechwe while spotted neck otter, hippo and crocodile inhabit the waterways. Animals to be encountered are elephant, buffalo, roan, sable, kudu, impala, oribi, zebra, wild dog as well as some 430 species of birds.

The Namibian Wetland Route, established in 2005, is a local tourism association of businesses along a route from Divundu to Impalila.

== History ==
Until the end of the 19th century, the area was known as Itenge, and it was under the rule of the Lozi kings. In the late 19th century the strip of land was administered as part of the British protectorate of Bechuanaland (Botswana). The German Empire in 1890 laid claim to the British-administered island of Zanzibar; Britain objected and the dispute was settled at the Berlin Conference later that year. On 1 July 1890, the British acquired Zanzibar and Germany acquired the territory which became known as the Caprivi Strip. Caprivi was named after German Chancellor Leo von Caprivi, who negotiated the land in an 1890 exchange with the United Kingdom. Leo von Caprivi arranged for the Caprivi Strip to be annexed to German South West Africa in order to give Germany access to the Zambezi as part of the Heligoland-Zanzibar Treaty. The German motivation behind the swap was to acquire a strip of land linking German South West Africa with the Zambezi, providing easy access to Tanganyika (Tanzania) and an outlet to the Indian Ocean. Unfortunately for the Germans, the British colonisation of Rhodesia (Zimbabwe and Zambia) stopped them well upstream of Victoria Falls, which proved a considerable barrier to navigation on the Zambezi.

During World War I, the Caprivi Strip again came under British rule and was governed as part of Bechuanaland but it received little attention and became known as a lawless frontier. The region became of geopolitical importance during the 1980s when it was used as a jumping off point and re-supply route for South African support for the UNITA movement in Angola.

Caprivi Region became one of Namibia's thirteen regions when the country gained independence in 1990.

=== Renaming ===
In August 2013, following a recommendation of the fourth Delimitation Commission for the Electoral Commission of Namibia, the Caprivi Region was renamed the Zambezi Region in a step to eliminate names of colonial administrators from Namibia's maps. Alternative proposals for the region's name had included Iyambezi, Linyandi, Itenge, and others. The name of the Zambezi town of Schuckmannsburg was also changed to Luhonono as part of the same process.

The renaming was not without controversy, however. The group Concerned Caprivians (or Caprivi Concerned Group) released a press statement expressing concern over the name change as well as Delimitation Commission boundary and constituency demarcation changes. Caprivi African National Union (CANU) party secretary general Robert Sililo argued that the renaming was motivated by a desire to dilute Caprivian identity and history. A statement from Concerned Caprivians read, "the name change from Caprivi to Zambezi is destined to destroy our identity and history as a symbol of renaissance, the dilution of political foundations in the identity of CANU party".

== Demographics ==
As of 2023, Zambezi is home to 142,373 inhabitants. In the general population, women outnumber men, with 97 males per 100 females. The population is majority rural, with only 33.9% living in urban settlements. The population density is 9.7 people per km^{2}. 16.5% of residents are not Namibian citizens. There are 37,296 private households, averaging 3.7 members. The population is growing at an annual rate of 3.8%, with a fertility rate of 4.5 children per woman. 16.1% is under 5, 23.7% 5-14, 34.1% 15-34, 20.6% 35-59, and 5.4% over 60.

=== Marriage status ===
47.5% of the adult population is married, either with certificate (4.2%), traditionally (30.5%), in a consensual union (5.0%), divorced (3.6%), or widowed (3.9%). 6.7% of the current youth population married before age 18.

=== Education and employment ===
The literacy rate has decreased from 2011 to 83.3%. 18.1% percent of pre-primary youth attend Early Childhood Development (ECD) programs. The maximum level of educational attainment is mostly primary (43.3%), with only 28.6% pursuing secondary education and 11.2% pursuing tertiary education. 12.2% has no educational attainment. 37.8% of inhabitants earn a wage or salary as their primary source of income, 10.1% receive an old-age pension, 13.3% rely on farming, and 13% are involved in non-farming business.

=== Technology access ===
From 2011 to 2023, technology access largely improved. As of 2023, 84.2% of the population has access to safe drinking water, compared to 73.2% in 2011. 23% have access to toilet facilities, a 3.5% decrease. The proportion of the population that has access to electricity for lighting has risen from 32% to 36.3% since 2011. Access to the internet has risen to 20.7%, while cellphone ownership is relatively similar at 44.9% (from 42.2% in 2011).
