= NamParks Project =

Nam parks programme

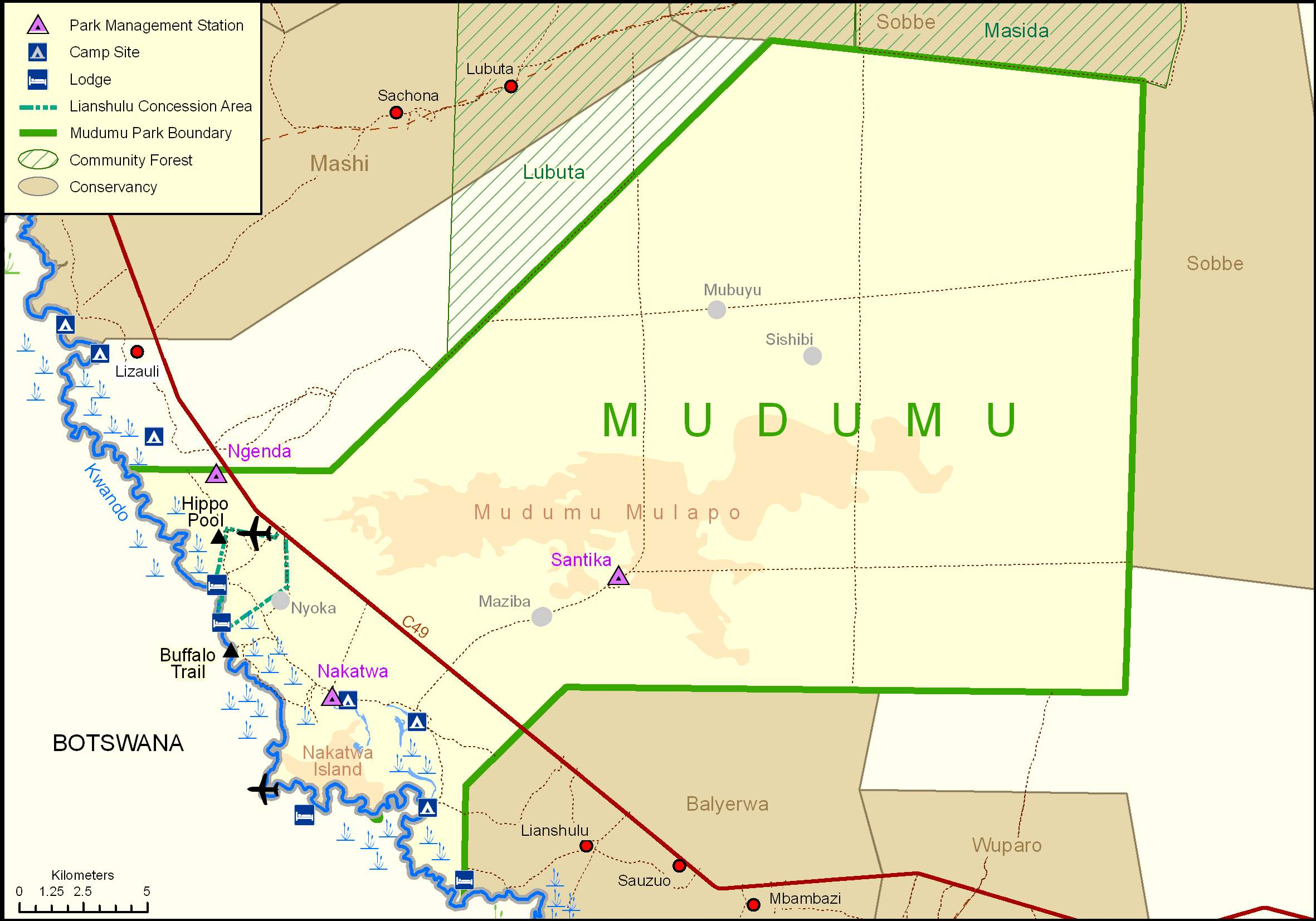
Mudumu National Park

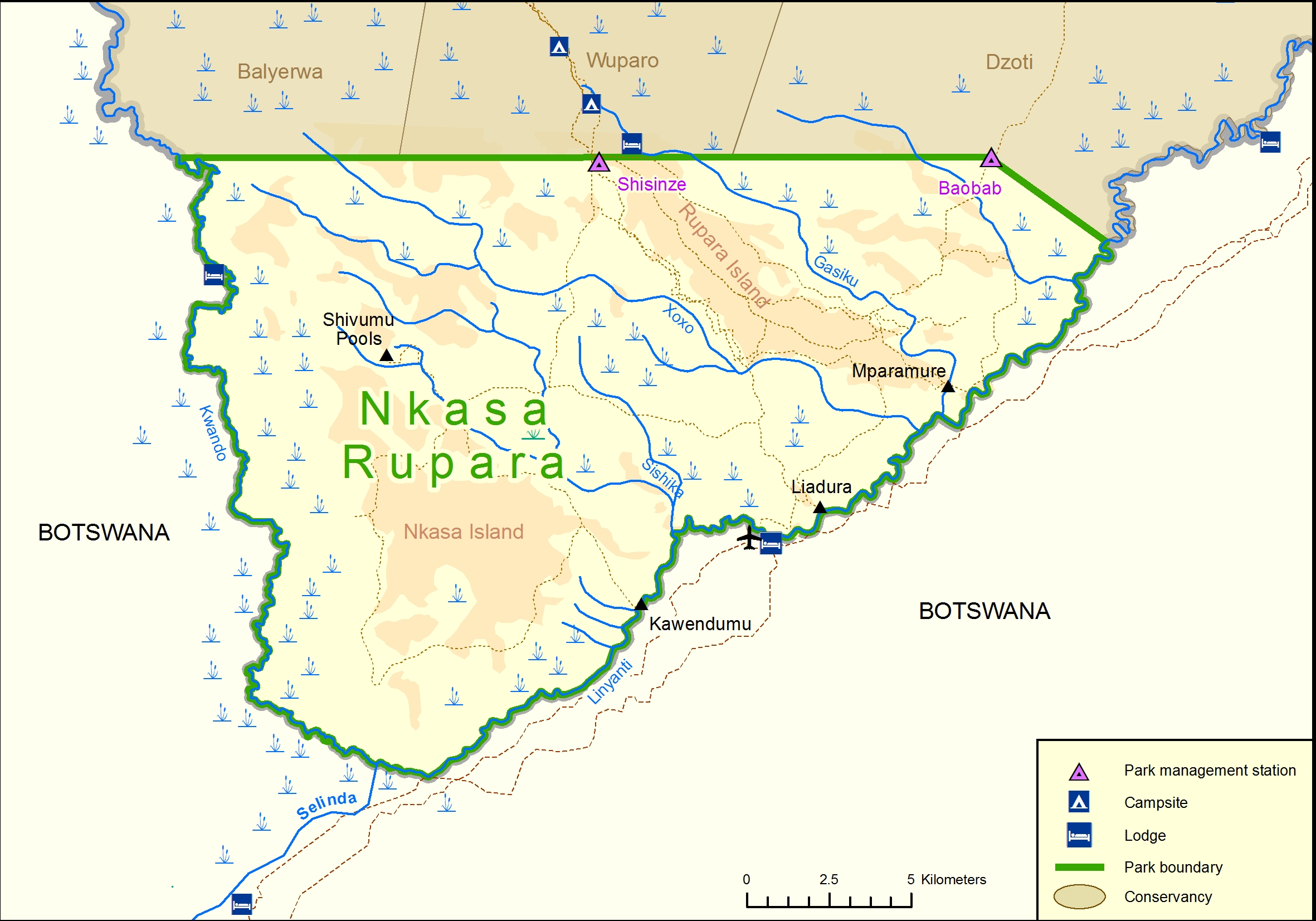
Nkasa Rupara National Park

NamParks or the Namibian National Parks Programme is a programme of the Namibian Ministry of Environment and Tourism (MET). It was established in 2006 and is supported by the Federal Republic of Germany through KfW. It works in Bwabwata, Khaudum, Mudumu and Nkasa Rupara (formerly Mamili) national parks in north eastern Namibia. The parks are part of a larger conservation area, the Kavango–Zambezi Transfrontier Conservation Area (KAZA TFCA). They contain biodiversity and habitat that are not found elsewhere in Namibia. They are also important for tourism. Partners believe that investment in the north eastern parks contributes to the ecological and economic development of the KAZA TFCA.

The north eastern national parks are relatively new compared with other Namibian protected areas. Khaudum, Mudumu, and Nkasa Rupara (formerly Mamili) national parks were created in 1990, shortly before Namibia gained independence from South Africa.

Bwabwata National Park, created in 2007, consists of the former Caprivi Game Park and Mahango Game Reserve. Bwabwata National Park has more than 5,500 park residents, mainly Khoe San or Bushmen. Large communities of mainly subsistence farmers surround all of these parks.

The Namibian government has developed programmes to ensure that communities can manage and benefit from natural resources. Integrated park management builds on Namibia's Community-based Natural Resource Management (CBNRM) Programme. The NamParks Programme builds on the CBNRM Programme to include the management of national parks in land units. NamParks encourages biodiversity conservation and the wise use of natural resources. Large game migrates across the Caprivi Strip in Namibia between Botswana, Angola, Namibia and Zambia. Areas known as animal migration corridors are zoned so that animals do not destroy farmland. The German Government has committed €12 million to three programme phases. It has also committed €10 million over 6 years for developing the KAZA initiative.

- NamParks has concentrated on improved park planning, good park management and development, staff training and biodiversity protection.
- It has helped develop management, business and tourism plans that guide short and long-term park management.
- Funding has improved park infrastructure, such as park management stations.
- New vehicles and boats were bought to help staff conduct for patrols and extension work.
- NamParks has encouraged strong partnerships with existing programmes and NGOs in support of common objectives.

== Links ==
- https://web.archive.org/web/20140119220738/http://www.met.gov.na/Directorates/Parks/Pages/BwabwataMudumu-Mamiliproject.aspx
