= List of national parks of Namibia =

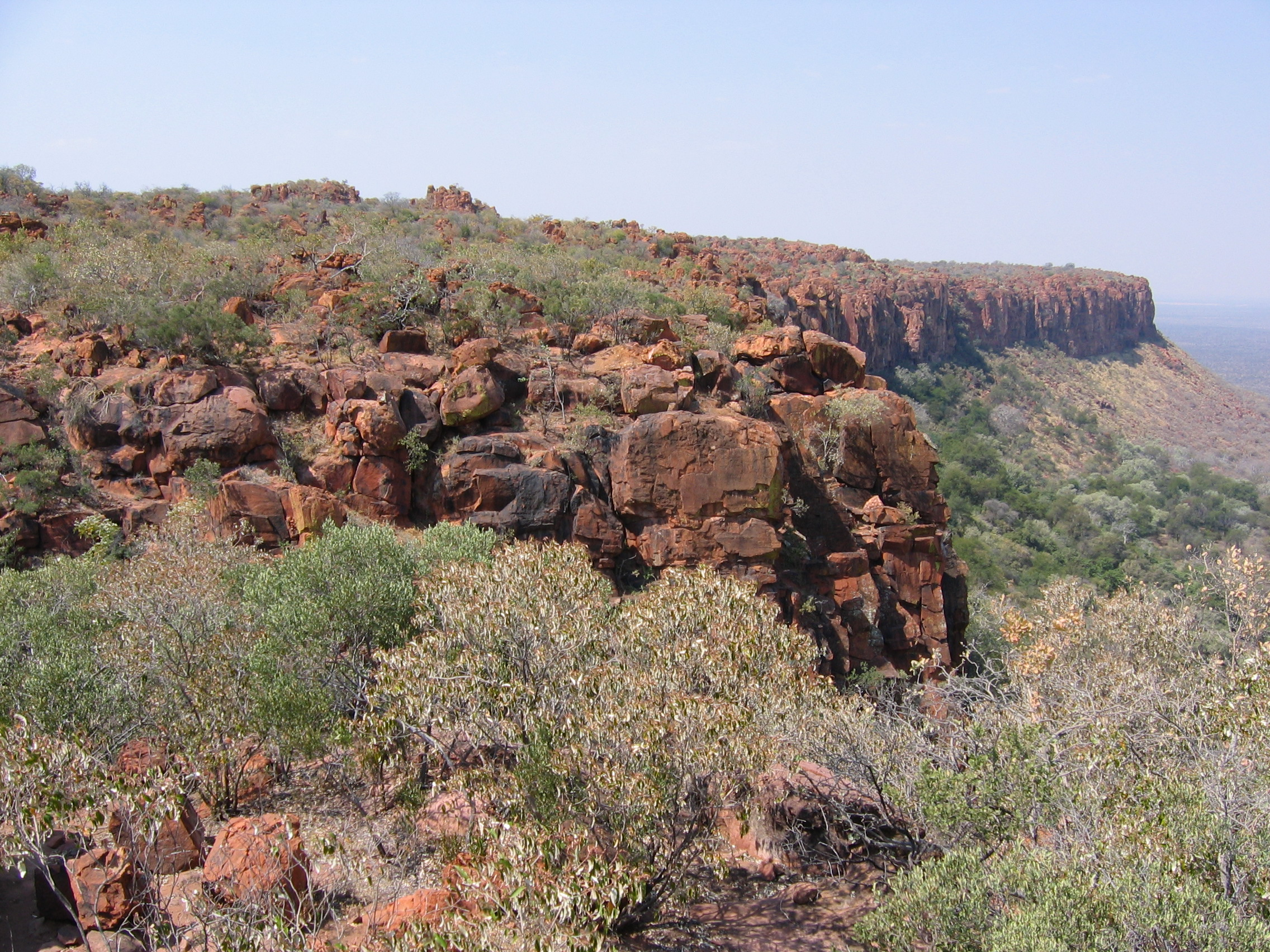
Waterberg National Park

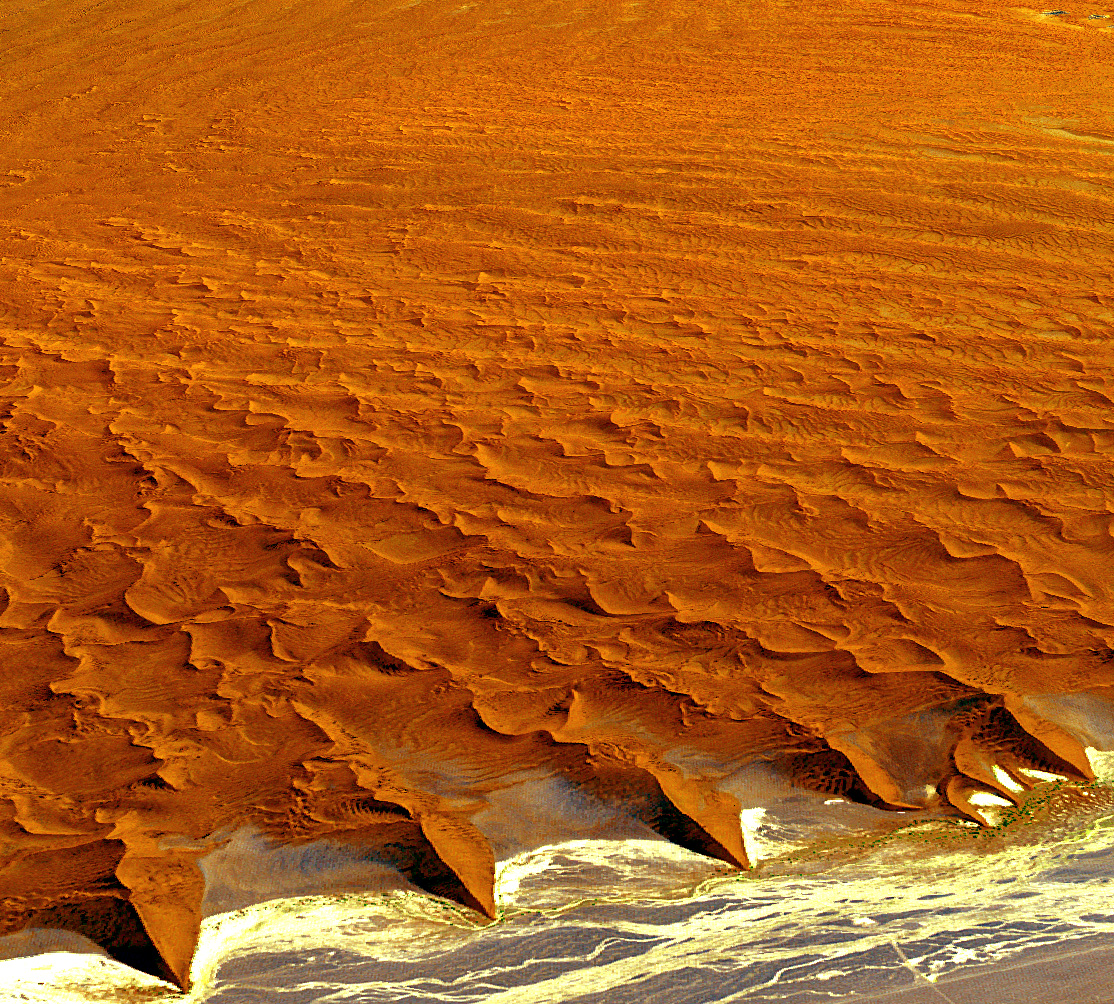
Namib-Naukluft National Park

This is a list of national parks in Namibia, operated by the Ministry of Environment and Tourism.

== National parks ==
- ǀAi-ǀAis Hot Springs Game Park
- Bwabwata National Park
- Dorob National Park
- Etosha National Park
- Khaudum National Park
- Mangetti National Park
- Mudumu National Park
- Namib-Naukluft National Park
- Nkasa Rupara National Park
- Skeleton Coast National Park
- Tsau ǁKhaeb National Park
- Waterberg Plateau Park

== Other protected areas ==
- Cape Cross Seal Reserve
- Daan Viljoen Game Reserve
- Hardap Recreation Resort
- Gross Barmen Hot Springs
- Popa Game Park
- South West Nature Park, the National Botanic Garden in Windhoek

== Transfrontier conservation areas ==
- ǀAi-ǀAis/Richtersveld Transfrontier Park
- Iona – Skeleton Coast Transfrontier Conservation Area
- Kavango–Zambezi Transfrontier Conservation Area

== See also ==
- List of national parks in Africa
- Tourism in Namibia
