= Bwabwata National Park =

Namibian national park

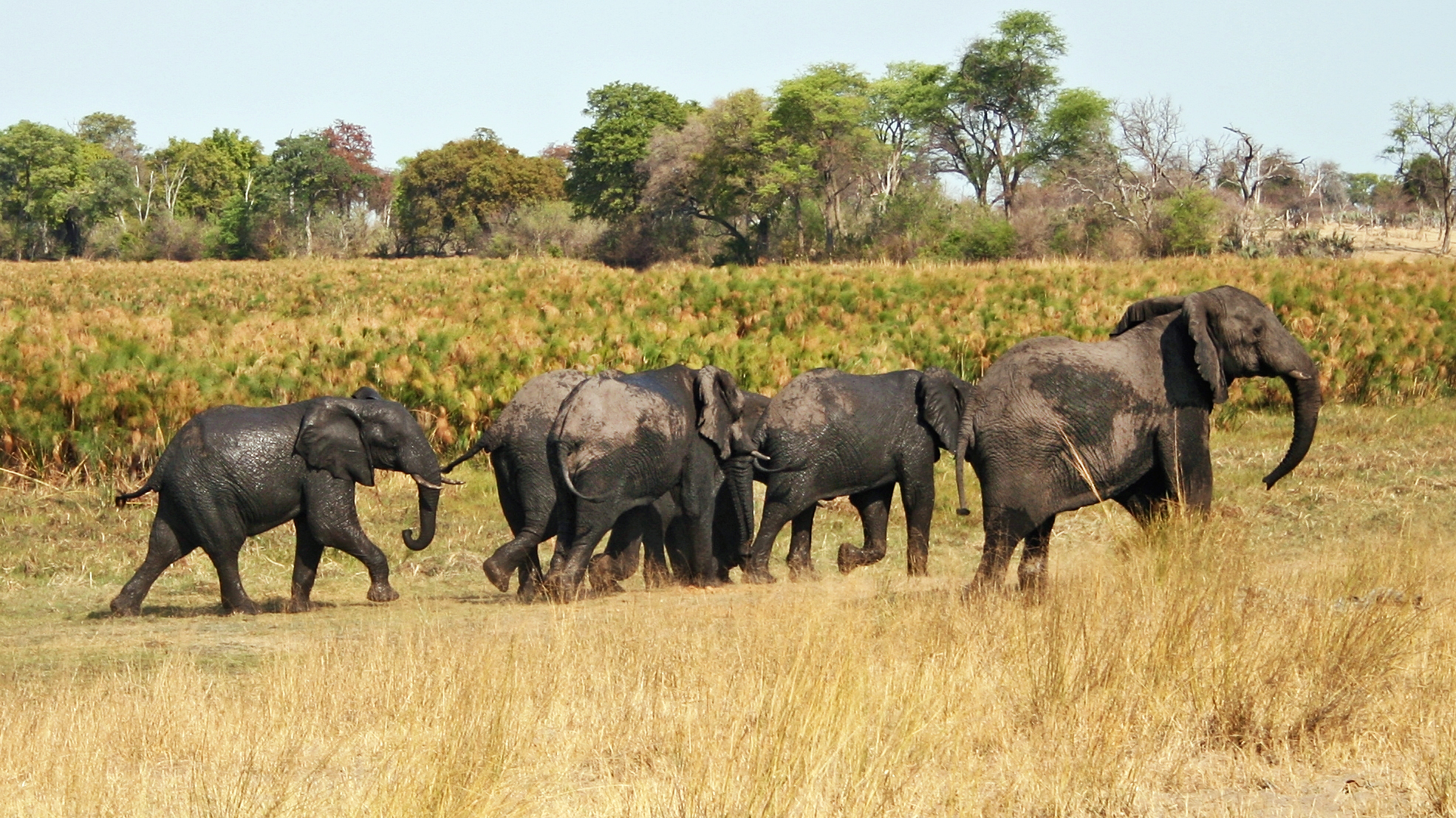

- Location within Namibia
- Location: Northeast Namibia
- Nearest town: Rundu, Katima Mulilo
- Coordinates: 17.95°S 22.54°E
- Area: 6,274 km^{2} (2,422 sq mi)
- Established: 2007
- Governing body: Ministry of Environment and Tourism, Namibia

Bwabwata National Park is a protected area in northeastern Namibia that was established in 2007 and covers 6,274 km^{2} (2,422 sq mi). It was created by merging Namibia's Caprivi Game Park and Mahango Game Park. It is situated in the Zambezi and Kavango East regions, extending along the Caprivi Strip. It is bounded by the Okavango River to the west and the Kwando River to the east. Angola lies to the north and Botswana to the south.

The area is an important migration route from Botswana to Angola for African elephant and some other game species. It is an unusual Protected Area as about 5,500 people live in the park. The Namibian government involves park residents and neighbours in planning and managing the park.

== History ==
The area was first proclaimed as Caprivi Nature Park in 1963. It became the Caprivi Game Reserve in 1966 and upgraded to the Caprivi Game Park in 1968. The South African Defence Force occupied it during Namibia's war of liberation.

The Defence Force left the area shortly before Namibia obtained Independence from South Africa in 1990. The Namibian Government commissioned a study to assess the fauna and flora and developed plans to accommodate both biodiversity protection and the 5,500 park residents.

Mahango Game Reserve, to the west of the Park, was proclaimed in 1989. The Caprivi Game Park, Mahango Game Reserve and an unproclaimed area along the Cuando River were united to become Bwabwata National Park in 2007.

On 29 November 2013, LAM Mozambique Airlines Flight 470 was deliberately crashed by the captain in the park killing all 33 passengers and crew on board.

== Geography and access ==
The park is 40 km north to south and 190 km from west to east. Bwabwata is situated in the Caprivi and Kavango regions, extending along the Caprivi Strip. It is bounded by the Okavango River to the west and the Kwando River to the east. Angola lies to the north and Botswana to the south.

The main road between the towns of Rundu and Katima Mulilo, the Trans-Caprivi Highway (B8), runs through Bwabwata, linking Namibia to Botswana, Zambia and Zimbabwe. A minor road (C48) dissects Mahango in a north-south direction and connects Namibia to Botswana.

At either end of the Park are small settlements – Kongola in the east and Divundu in the west.

The park is largely unfenced, but the southern boundary with Botswana has three veterinary standard fences. These prevent the spread of cattle diseases, such as Foot-and-mouth disease.

== Biology and ecology ==
Bwabwata is located in the Tree and Shrub Savanna biome. Vegetation types include North-eastern Kalahari Woodland, Caprivi Mopane Woodland, Riverine Woodlands and Islands, Okavango Valley, Caprivi Floodplains. The landscape consists of low vegetated sand dunes with old drainage lines (Omiramba) in between.

Bwabwata forms a crucial trans-boundary link for wildlife movement between Angola, Botswana, Namibia and Zambia.

=== Flora ===
Typical trees include Zambezi teak (Baikiaea plurijuga), wild seringa (Burkea africana), African teak (Pterocarpus angolensis), manketti (Schinziophyton rautanenii), false mopane (Guibourtia coleosperma), camelthorn tree (Acacia erioloba), jackalberry (Diospyros mespiliformis) and makalani palm (Hyphaene petersiana).

=== Fauna ===
Several rare large mammal and bird species are found in Bwabwata. Elephants regularly move between Namibia, Angola, Botswana and Zambia. Other species found are Cape buffalo, hippopotamus, roan antelope, sable antelope, tsessebe, zebra, wildebeest, common reedbuck, red lechwe, sitatunga and crocodile. Main predators are lion, leopard, cheetah and spotted hyena.

The Mahango Area and Kavango River in western Bwabwata are listed as an internationally Important Bird Area supporting globally threatened species and is an avian diversity hotspot. Species include black-winged pratincole, slaty egret, wattled crane, African skimmer, African pygmy-goose, coppery-tailed coucal, white-backed night heron, rufous-bellied heron, Allen's gallinule, Dickinson's kestrel, black-faced babbler, swamp boubou, collared palm thrush, Meves's starling, southern ground hornbill, barred owlet, Bennett's woodpecker, wood owl, various warblers and cisticolas.

A long-term data analysis covering 1996 to 2019 found biodiversity losses caused by woody encroachment..

== Fires ==
Fires occur almost annually and are mainly caused by humans and lightning. Although fires are a natural phenomenon in these savannas, too frequent or infrequent fires may negatively affect vegetation and fauna. A managed burning programme aims to reduce the frequency and intensity of fires.

== Recreation ==
Visitors travelling off the main road need a permit and must drive only on designated roads. Several sandy roads, suitable for all-wheel drive vehicles, are found near the Kwando and Okavango rivers.

Bwabwata has three community-operated campsites within the park, namely Nǁgoabaca, Nambwa and Bum Hill. Local communities, organised into communal area conservancies, earn revenue from these campsites. Several lodges are situated outside Bwabwata on its borders. Tour operators offer game drives, boat trips and walks in the Park.

== Kavango–Zambezi Transfrontier Conservation Area ==
Angola, Botswana, Namibia, Zambia and Zimbabwe have agreed to manage trans-boundary conservation through the Kavango–Zambezi Transfrontier Conservation Area (KaZa TFCA). Bwabwata is situated in the centre of the KaZa TFCA and forms a corridor for elephant movement from Botswana into Angola and Zambia.

== Park management ==
To accommodate Bwabwata’s resident people, the Namibian Government has adopted integrated park management. The park is zoned into core areas for conservation and farming. Three areas are designated for special protection and controlled tourism – Kwando (1,345 square kilometres (519 sq mi)), Buffalo (629 square kilometres (243 sq mi)), and Mahango (245 square kilometres (95 sq mi)). A large Multiple Use Area (4,055 square kilometres (1,566 sq mi)) is zoned for community-based tourism, trophy hunting, human settlement and farming.

Park residents are mostly from the Khwe San bushmen minority group. Most residents live in Omega village in the central part of the park and several smaller settlements. Residents have formed the Kyaramacan Association to represent them. Kyaramacan manages income from tourism (the Nǁgoabaca campsite and a small lodge), from trophy hunting and the sale of devil's claw (Harpagophytum procumbens), a plant sold internationally to reduce pain and fever.

The Namibian Government, through the Ministry of Environment and Tourism, works with local communities to manage Bwabwata National Park. A technical committee, consisting of representatives from other Government departments, conservancies, community forests and non-governmental organisations, advises the Minister of Environment and Tourism. Community game guards work with the Ministry of Environment and Tourism staff to prevent poaching.

Among the measures to manage the ecology of the park, is fire management. Past efforts of fire management have found to be ineffective.

== Park development ==
Bwabwata is one of five national parks in north-eastern Namibia. It is managed as a unit with Mangetti, Khaudum National Park, Mudumu National Park and Nkasa Rupara (formerly Mamili National Park).

Since 2006, the NamParks Project (formerly BMM Parks Project), co-funded by the Federal Republic of Germany through KfW has helped develop management and tourism plans and constructed new park offices and staff housing in Namibia’s north-eastern parks, including Bwabwata. The Project has helped introduce park-friendly land-uses in the surrounding areas and collaborative management structures. Management priorities include the conservation of important habitats, safeguarding corridors for regional wildlife migration; providing income for rural residents and developing tourism.

== See also ==
- List of national parks of Namibia
- Zambezi Region
- Caprivi Game Park
