= Mudumu National Park =

National park in Namibia

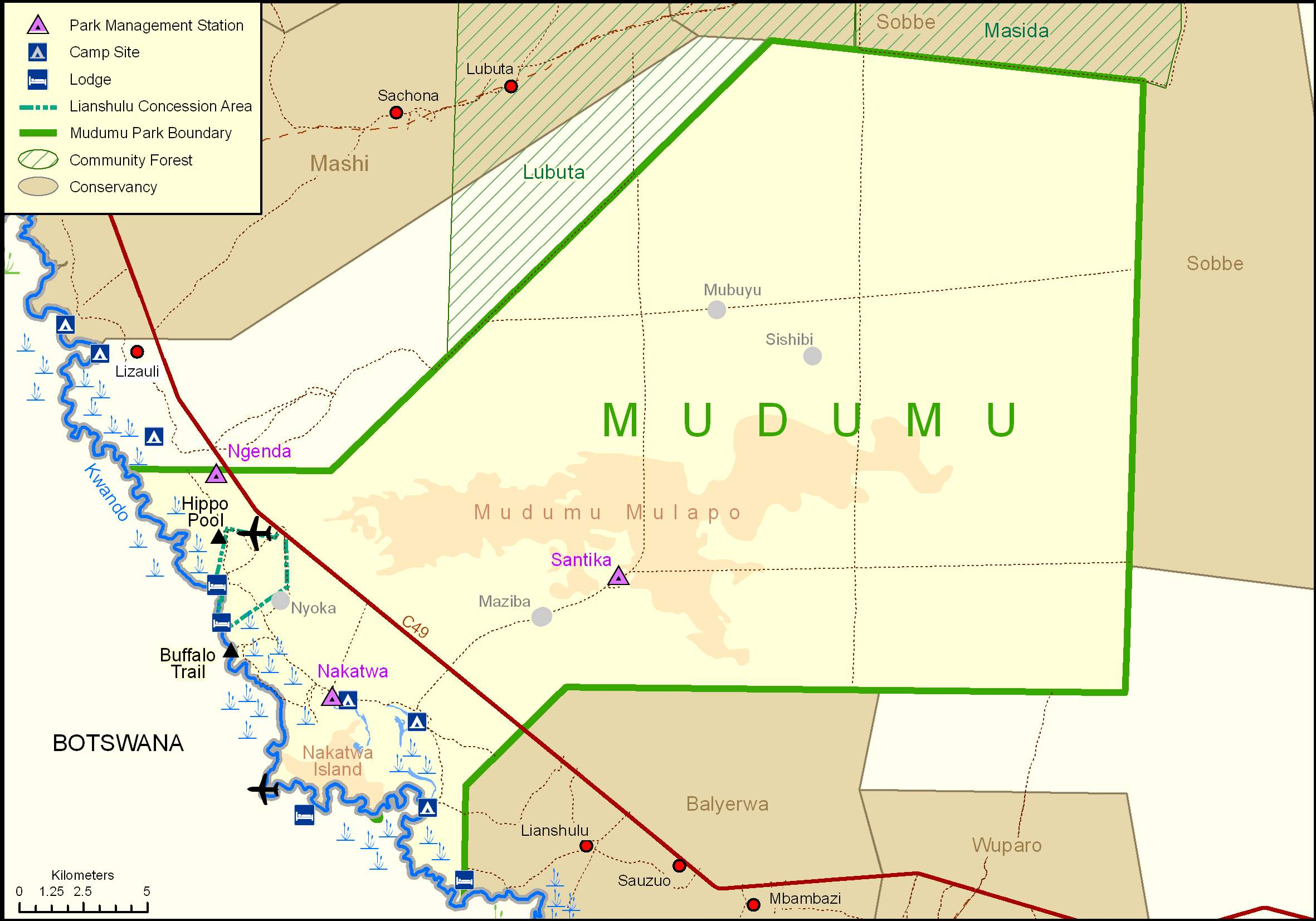
- Mudumu National Park

- Location within Namibia
- Location: Namibia
- Coordinates: 18°6′S 23°36′E
- Area: 737 km^{2} (285 sq mi)
- Established: 1990

Mudumu is a National Park in Caprivi Region of north-eastern Namibia. Established in 1990, the park covers an area of 737 square kilometres (285 sq mi). The Kwando River forms the western border with Botswana. Various communal area conservancies and community forests surround Mudumu National Park.

The area is an important migration route from Botswana to Angola for large game species such as African elephant. There is no boundary fences, and Mudumu forms a crucial trans-boundary link for wildlife migration between Angola, Botswana, Namibia and Zambia. It is in the centre of Africa’s largest conservation area, the Kavango-Zambezi Trans-Frontier Conservation Area (KaZa TFCA).

== History ==
Mudumu National Park was created in 1990, shortly before Namibia's independence. Although the approved size of the park is 1,010 square kilometres (390 sq mi), the actual size is 737 square kilometres (285 sq mi).

== Climate ==
Average annual rainfall is between 550 millimetres (22 in) and 700 millimetres (28 in) per year, with the peak rainy period arriving in January and February. In years of heavy rainfall, flooding can be extensive, although Mudumu is drier than her sister park, Nkasa Rupara.

== Geography and access ==
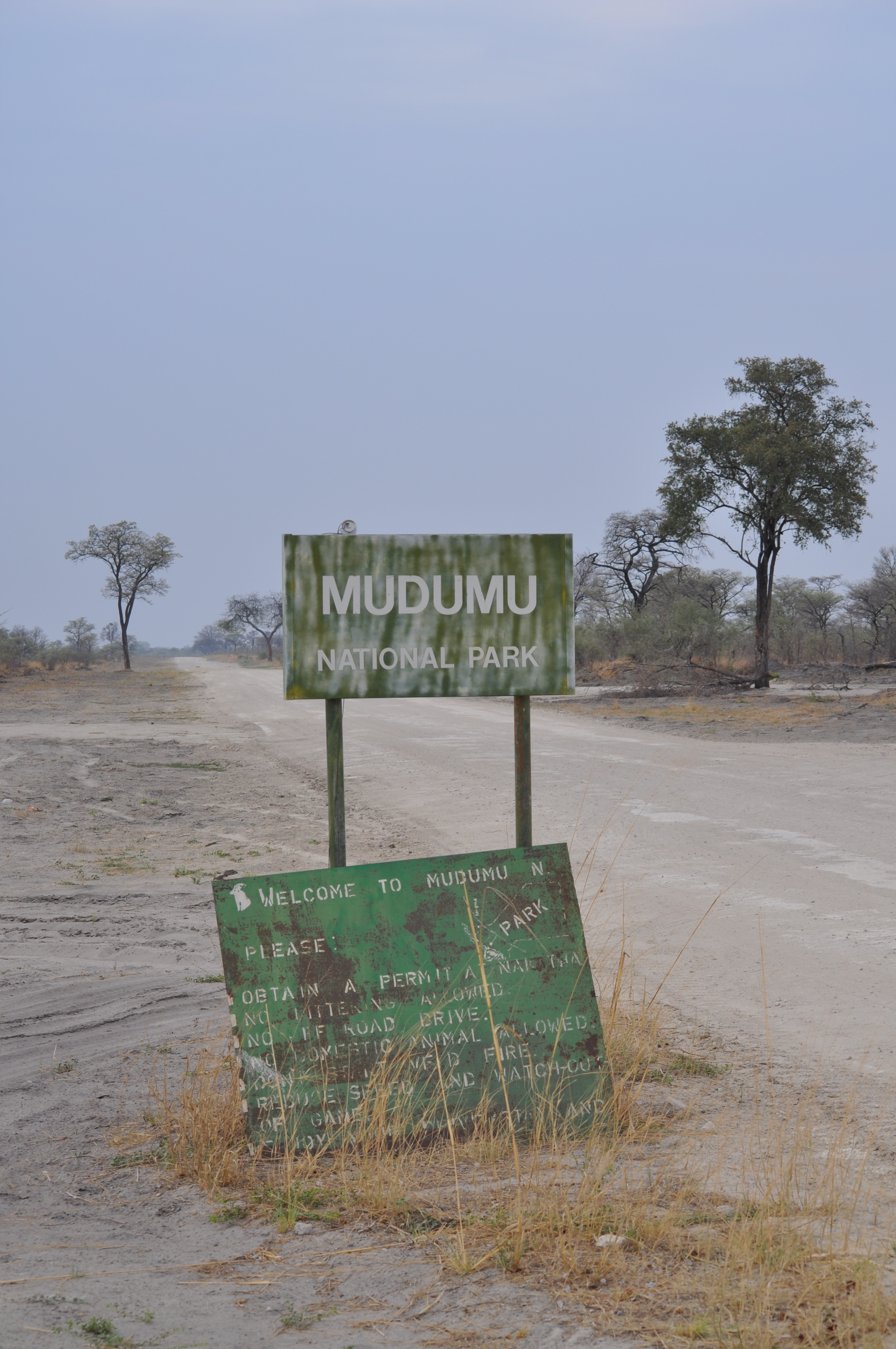

The park is situated approximately 35 kilometres (22 mi) south of Kongola, bordered by Botswana to the west, and various communal area conservancies. The entire park is flat, with no hills or mountains. A fossilized river course - the Mudumu Mulapo – lies in the centre of the park. This is a seasonally dry, open channel that drains the primarily Mopane woodlands of the hinterland to the east. There is no formal entrance gate and the park is unfenced. A graded track, called a cutline, separates the park from neighbouring communal farmland. C49 (D3511) road runs through the park linking the villages of Kongola and Sangwali.

== Biology and ecology ==
Mudumu National Park is situated in the tree and shrub savannah biome. Vegetation types are north-eastern Kalahari woodlands, riverine woodlands and islands, Caprivi mopane woodland and Caprivi floodplains. The Kwando River floodplain, grasslands, riparian woodlands and dense mopane woodland shelter woodland fauna and flora.

=== Flora ===
Mopane (Colophospermum mopane), wild syringa (Burkea africana), leadwood (Combretum imberbe) and mangosteen (Garcinia livingstonei) are common trees.

=== Fauna ===
Mudumu has a large African elephant population. Other animals include African buffalo, lion, leopard, spotted hyena, cheetah, African wild dog, hippopotamus, Nile crocodile, sitatunga, meerkat, red lechwe, sable antelope, Common eland, giraffe, impala, plains zebra, blue wildebeest and spotted-necked otter. There are no black or white rhinos in this park. Sable antelope, giraffe and eland were re-introduced into the area.

Tiger fish and tilapia are common fish species. 430 bird species have been recorded, including African fish eagle, African skimmer and western banded snake eagle.

== Fire ==
Natural fires caused by lightning and human-made fires burn large sections of the park each year. Firebreaks are made during the wet summer months. An early burning programme has been introduced in the dry winter months from May–July.

== Recreation ==
Walking, bird watching and game viewing are the main tourism activities.

The Namibian Government has divided the park into various areas, called concessions. These create zones for various activities. Two privately managed lodges are in the park.

No permits are needed for travelling on the C49 road that connects the villages of Kongola and Lizauli. Permits are required on all other roads and tracks within the park. Most roads require four-wheel drive vehicles. During the rainy season from November to April it is recommended to drive in a convoy of at least two vehicles.

Mudumu is located within a high-risk malaria area.

== Kavango-Zambezi Trans-frontier Conservation Area ==
Angola, Botswana, Namibia, Zambia and Zimbabwe have agreed to manage trans-boundary conservation through the Kavango–Zambezi Trans-frontier Conservation Area (KaZa TFCA). Mudumu is situated in the centre of the Kaza TFCA and forms a corridor for elephant, buffalo, roan and sable antelope movement from Botswana into Angola and Zambia.

KaZa includes numerous proclaimed national parks (including Mudumu), game reserves, community conservation areas, forest reserves, and iconic tourism destinations such as the Victoria Falls and Okavango Delta. KaZa aims to broaden the protected areas network, increase biodiversity, expand historical game migration routes and attract tourists to the area.

In a place where local people often bear the costs of living with wildlife, KaZa aims to make the protection of wildlife and wild places economically more attractive to rural communities.

== Park management ==
Mudumu National Park is one of five national parks in north-eastern Namibia. It is managed as a unit with Bwabwata National Park, Khaudom National Park, Mangetti National Park and Nkasa Lupala (formerly Mamili National Park). Since 2006, the NamParks Project (formerly BMM Parks Project), co-funded by the Federal Republic of Germany through KfW, has helped develop these parks.

Funding has been used to set up tourism, business and management plans, improve infrastructure, translocate animals back into their natural habitat and develop partnerships between Government and communities to manage parks with other land units.

Mudumu National Park forms part of the Mudumu North and Mudumu South complexes. Complexes group formally protected areas, conservancies and forestry management areas into single units to manage resources across park and conservancy boundaries. Stakeholders work together on law enforcement and anti-poaching, fire management (early burning), game monitoring and wildlife translocations. This approach is known as integrated park management.

== Park development ==
The Ngenda Ranger Station is the park headquarters. Staff offices, entrance gates and housing were built as part of the cooperation.

NamParks has helped introduce park-friendly land-uses in the surrounding areas and collaborative management structures.

Mudumu serves as a core wildlife area, supplying wildlife to neighbouring conservancies that can encourage tourists. Trophy-hunting is practiced in the park under strict conditions.
