= Kavango–Zambezi Transfrontier Conservation Area =

Southern Africa conservation area

Coordinates: 17°47′S 25°15′E

Kavango–Zambezi Transfrontier Conservation Area (KAZA TFCA) is the second-largest nature and landscape conservation area in the world, spanning the international borders of five countries in Southern Africa. It includes a major part of the Upper Zambezi River and Okavango basins and Delta, the Caprivi Strip of Namibia, the southeastern part of Angola, southwestern Zambia, the northern wildlands of Botswana and western Zimbabwe. The centre of this area is at the confluence of the Zambezi and Chobe Rivers where the borders of Botswana, Namibia, Zambia and Zimbabwe meet. It incorporates a number of notable national parks and nature sites, including Chobe National Park, Hwange National Park, and the Victoria Falls. The region is home to approximately 250,000 African elephants, the largest population in the world.

== History ==
The idea was initiated by Shoshong Constituency Foundation and the World Wide Fund for Nature. It was inspired by the Okavango–Upper Zambezi International Tourism Initiative and the Four Corners Transboundary Natural Resource Management. In 2003 the ministers responsible for tourism in Angola, Botswana, Namibia, Zambia and Zimbabwe met in Katima Mulilo, Namibia, about the project. In 2006 the Southern African Development Community (SADC) endorsed the KAZA TFCA as a SADC project, and later in 2006 the five partner countries signed a memorandum of understanding at Victoria Falls, Zimbabwe. The establishment of the area was confirmed on August 18, 2011, through a treaty signed by the heads of government of the five participating countries. The official opening of the area occurred on March 15, 2012, in Katima Mulilo.

Financial support comes from a variety of sources. These include KfW Development bank, the German government, the World Bank, the Netherlands, and Sweden.

Lions were studied throughout the area in 2014. In November 2014, the governments of Zambia and Zimbabwe introduced a common KAZA visa, allowing holders to move freely across borders within the conservation area.

== Components ==
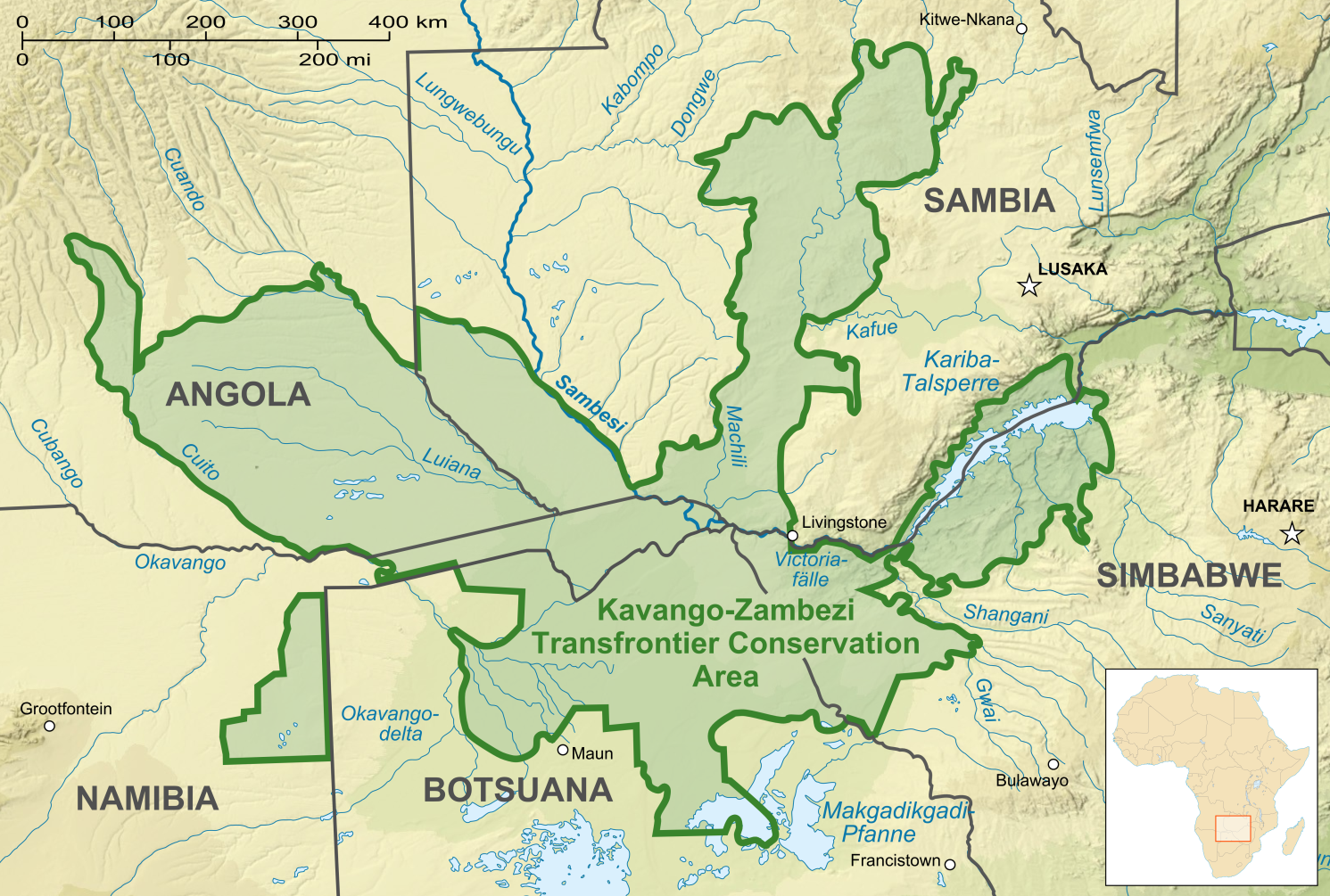
German-language map of the Kavango–Zambezi Transfrontier Conservation Area

The Kavango–Zambezi Transfrontier Conservation Area has an area of 520,000 km^{2} (200,000 sq mi). Of this land, 17% is in Angola, 30% in Botswana, 14% in Namibia, 25% in Zambia, and 14% in Zimbabwe.

287,132 km^{2} (110,862 sq mi) of the included land consists of pre-existing protected areas. The incorporated protected areas are:

in Zambia:

- Kafue National Park
- Liuwa Plain National Park
- Mosi-oa-Tunya National Park
- Sioma Ngwezi National Park
- Lower Zambezi National Park

in Namibia:

- Bwabwata National Park
- Khaudum National Park
- Mangetti National Park
- Mudumu National Park
- Nkasa Rupara National Park

in Botswana:

- Chobe National Park
- Makgadikgadi Pan
- Nxai Pan National Park
- Moremi Game Reserve

in Zimbabwe:

- Chizarira National Park
- Hwange National Park
- Kazuma Pan National Park
- Mana Pools National Park
- Matusadona National Park
- Victoria Falls National Park
- Zambezi National Park

in Angola:

- Luengue-Luiana National Park
- Longa-Mavinga National Park

== See also ==
- Wildlife of Zambia
