= Waterberg Plateau Park =

National park in central Namibia

- IUCN category II (national park)
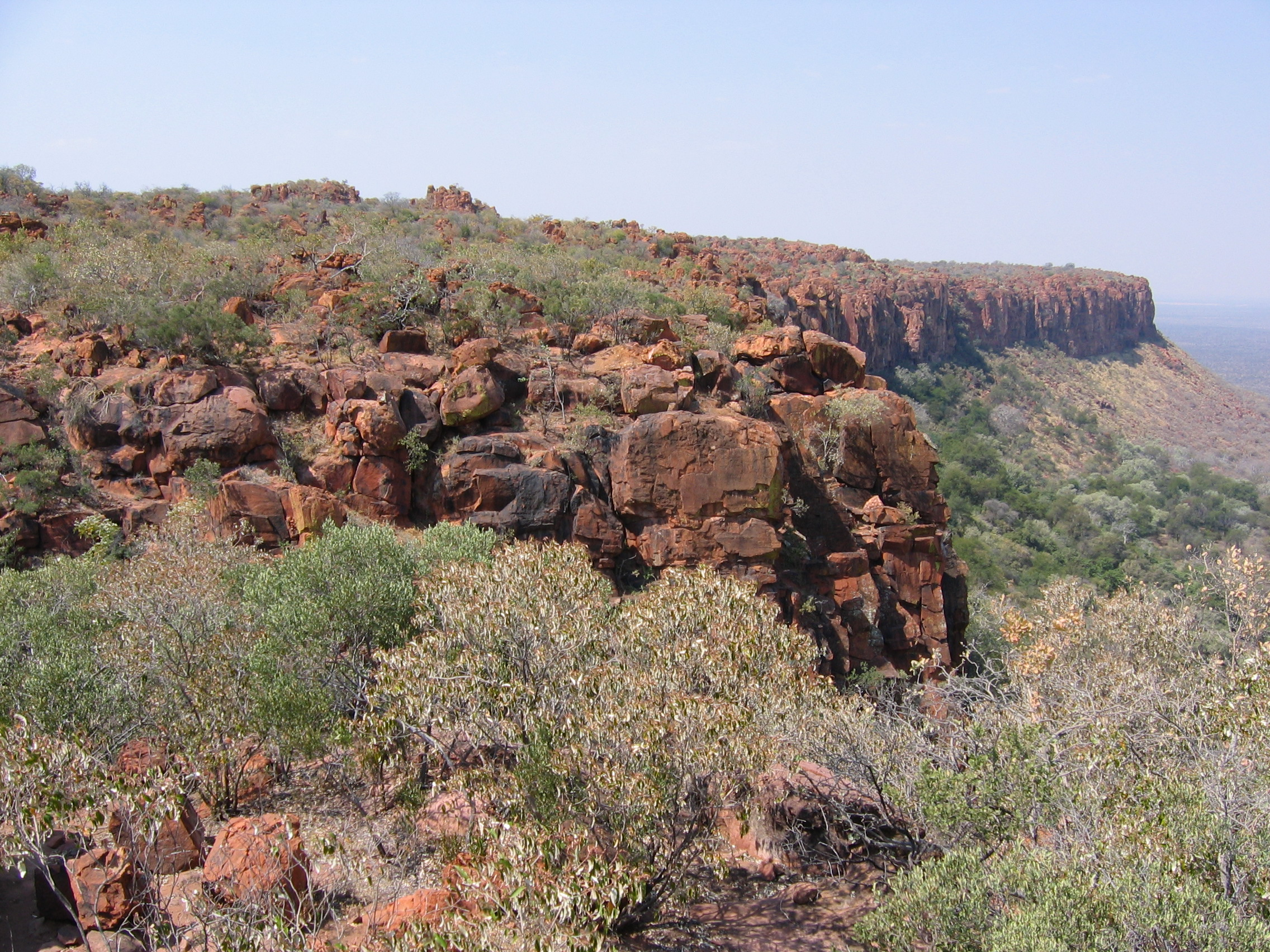
- On top of the Waterberg plateau

- Location within Namibia
- Location: Namibia
- Nearest city: Otjiwarongo
- Coordinates: 20°25′S 17°13′E
- Area: 405 km^{2} (156 sq mi)
- Established: 1972
- Governing body: Ministry of Environment and Tourism

Waterberg Plateau Park is a national park in central Namibia on the Waterberg Plateau, 68 kilometres (42 mi) south-east of Otjiwarongo. The plateau and the national park are named after the prominent table mountain that rises from the plateau, the Waterberg (Afrikaans: Water Mountain). The Waterberg Plateau is a particularly prominent landmark, elevating high above the plains of the Kalahari of Eastern Namibia. Waterberg Park and some 405 square kilometres (156 sq mi) of surrounding land were declared a Nature Reserve in 1972. As the plateau is largely inaccessible from beneath, several of Namibia's endangered animal species were relocated into the area during the early 1970s to protect them from predators and poaching to extinction. The programme was very successful and Waterberg now supplies other Namibian parks with rare animals. In 1989, the black rhinoceros was reintroduced to the area from Damaraland. The Waterberg Plateau Park is ecologically diverse and rich.

The plateau was declared a National Monument in 1956.

== Ecology and geology ==
The Waterberg is part of the Kalahari Sandveld. The Waterberg Plateau Park is ecologically diverse and rich and has over 200 different species of bird with some rare species of small antelope on the lower hills of the mountain. Geologically, the oldest rock stratum is over 850 million years old and dinosaur tracks were left there some 200 million years ago.

The mountain is surrounded by savannah rangeland, with a high prevalence of woody plant encroachment, which reduces overall biodiversity in the area.

== Human habitation ==
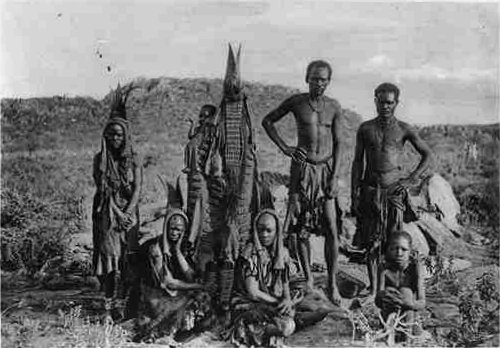
Herero tribe circa 1910

The first human inhabitants were the San people, who left rock engravings believed to be several thousand years old. A small tribe of the San were still living their traditional lifestyle on the plateau until the late 1960s.

The foothills were the site of one of the major turning points in Namibia's history. In 1904, in the Battle of Waterberg, the Herero people lost their last and greatest battle against German Colonial forces in the Herero and Namaqua Wars. Subsequently, in the Herero and Namaqua Genocide, nearly two thirds of the Herero population lost their lives, and about one thousand could escape to British Bechuanaland (now Botswana), where they received asylum. The graves of German soldiers who lost their lives at Waterberg can still be viewed near the Bernabe De La Bat rest camp at the base of the park.

== Gallery ==
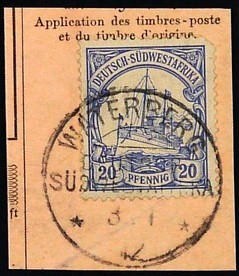
Stamps for German South West Africa postmarked Waterberg

== See also ==
- National parks (Namibia)
