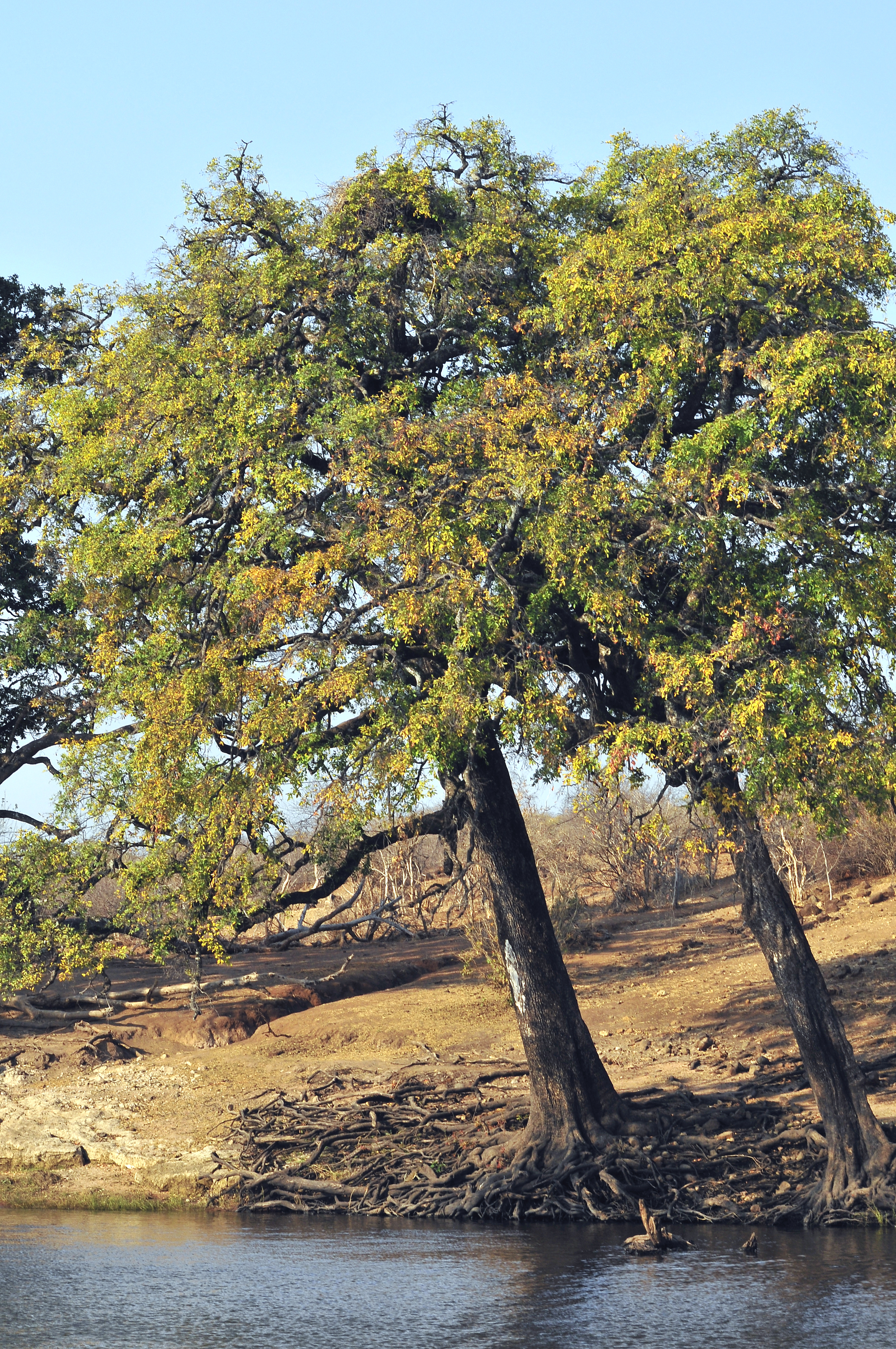
- Mature specimens on the shore of the Cuando River, Chobe N.P., Botswana

Conservation status
- Least Concern (IUCN 3.1)

Scientific classification
- Kingdom: Plantae
- Clade: Tracheophytes
- Clade: Angiosperms
- Clade: Eudicots
- Clade: Asterids
- Order: Ericales
- Family: Ebenaceae
- Genus: Diospyros
- Species: D. mespiliformis

Binomial name
- Diospyros mespiliformis Hochst. ex A. DC.

Synonyms
- Diospyros sabiensis Hiern; Diospyros senegalensis Perr. ex A. DC.

= Diospyros mespiliformis =

Jackalberry

Species of flowering plant

Diospyros mespiliformis, the jackalberry (also known as African ebony and by its Afrikaans name jakkalsbessie), is a large dioecious evergreen tree found mostly in the savannas of Africa. Jackals are fond of the fruit, hence the common names. It is a member of the family Ebenaceae, and is related to the true ebony (D. ebenum) and edible persimmon (D. kaki).

== Description ==
Mature trees have dark gray fissured bark. An adult tree reaches an average of 4 to 6 m (13 to 20 ft) in height, though occasionally trees reach 25 m (82 ft). The foliage is dense and dark green with elliptical leaves, which are often eaten by grazing animals such as elephants and African buffalo. The tree flowers in the rainy season; the flowers are imperfect, with genders on separate trees, and are cream-colored. The female tree bears fruit in the dry season and these are eaten by many wild animals; they are oval-shaped, yellow or purple when ripe and about 2–3 cm (0.8–1.2 in) in diameter. The fruit remain embedded in the persistent calyx lobes. Like the marula, the tree is favoured by the Bantu peoples, who will leave them growing in their cultivated lands in order to harvest the fruit.

== Range and habitat ==
Diospyros mespiliformis ranges widely through Subsaharan Africa as well as Yemen.

Jackalberry trees often grow in riparian forests and on termite mounds, preferring deep alluvial soils, but are not uncommon on sandy soils in savanna. It grows in mutualism with termites, which aerate the soil around its roots but do not eat the living wood; in turn, the tree provides protection for the termites. The jackalberry is the largest member of its genus in the southern subtropics, and is northwards present to the Sahara. It occurs in high densities from subtropical to tropical regions.

== Uses ==
=== Fruit ===
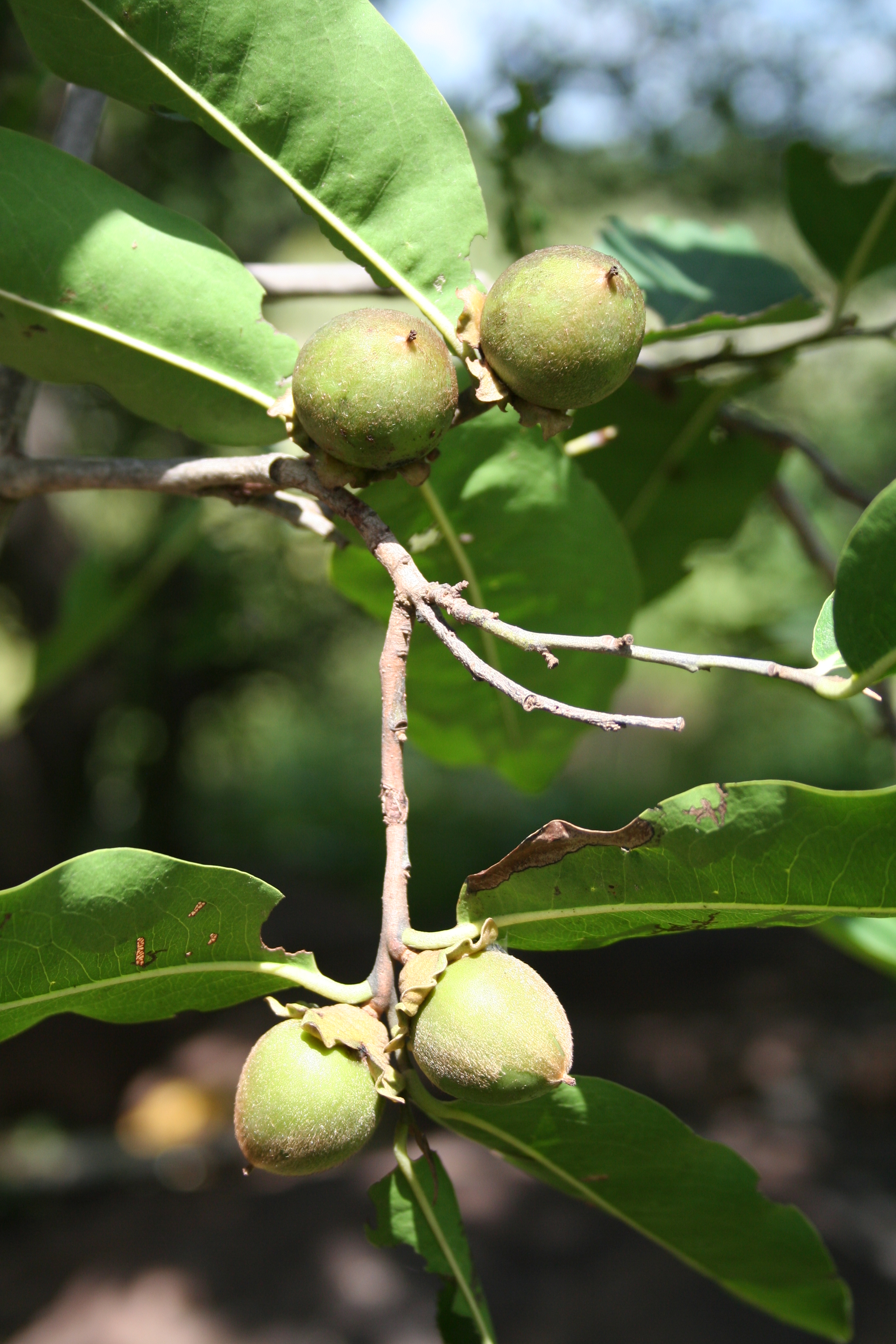
Fruiting branch of the female tree

A traditional food plant in Africa, this fruit has potential to improve nutrition, boost food security, foster rural development and support sustainable landcare.

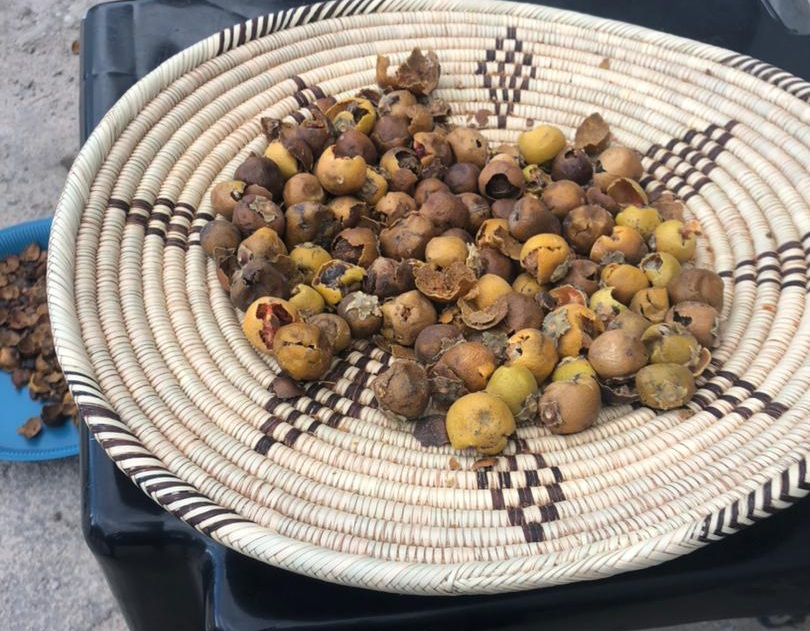
Dried fruits of the jackalberry tree, ready to be stored.

The fruit is edible for humans; its flavor has been described as lemon-like, with a chalky consistency when unripe, and sweet fleshy when ripe. On average the fruit contains 2-5 brown seeds. Most people prefer letting them dry before eating, and the dry ones are stored and consumed as a snack when the fresh fruit goes out of season. They are sometimes preserved, can be dried and ground into a flour, and are often used for brewing beer and brandy.

The Ovambo people call the fruit of the jackalberry eenyandi and use it to distill ombike, their traditional liquor.

=== Medicinal ===
The leaves, bark and roots of the tree contain tannin, which can be used as a styptic to staunch bleeding. The roots are consumed to purge parasites and are thought to be a remedy for leprosy.

=== Wood ===
The wood of the jackalberry is almost impervious to termite damage. The heart wood is fine-grained and strong, and is often used for making wood floors and furniture. Trunks of the tree are used for canoes. The wood ranges in color from light reddish-brown to a very dark brown.

== Gallery ==
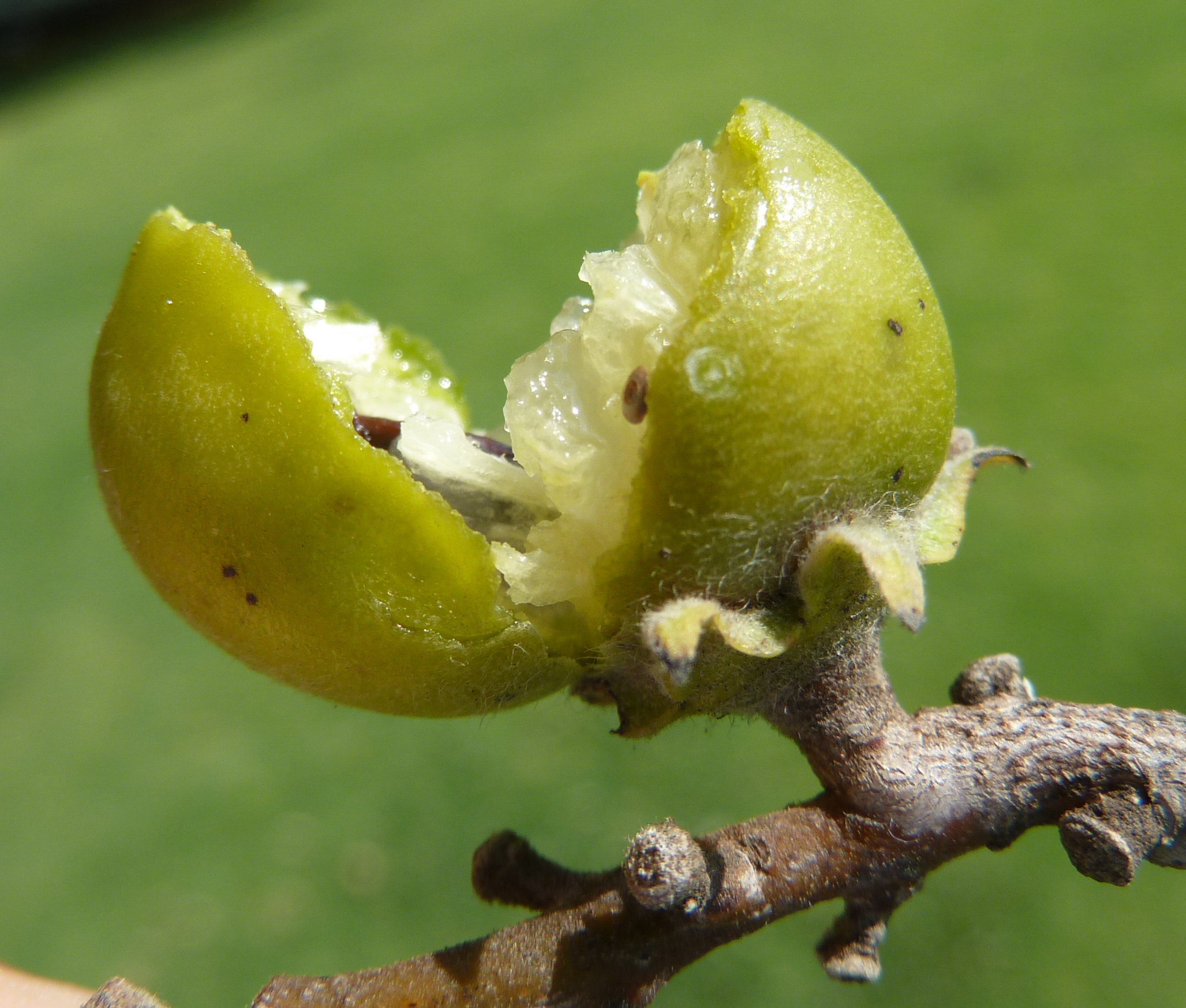
broken green fruit

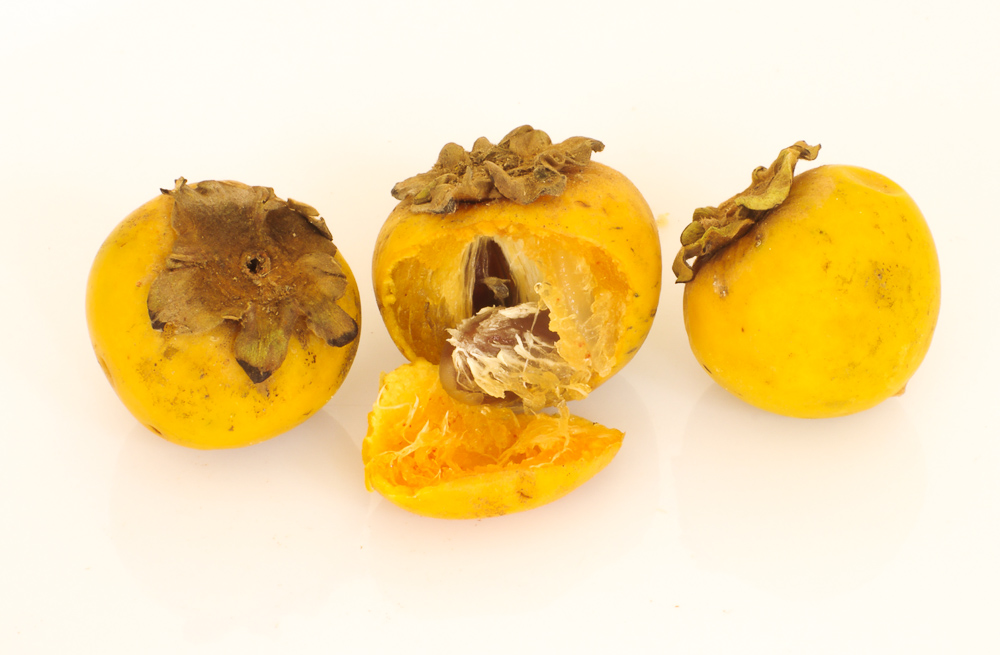
ripe fruit, disected

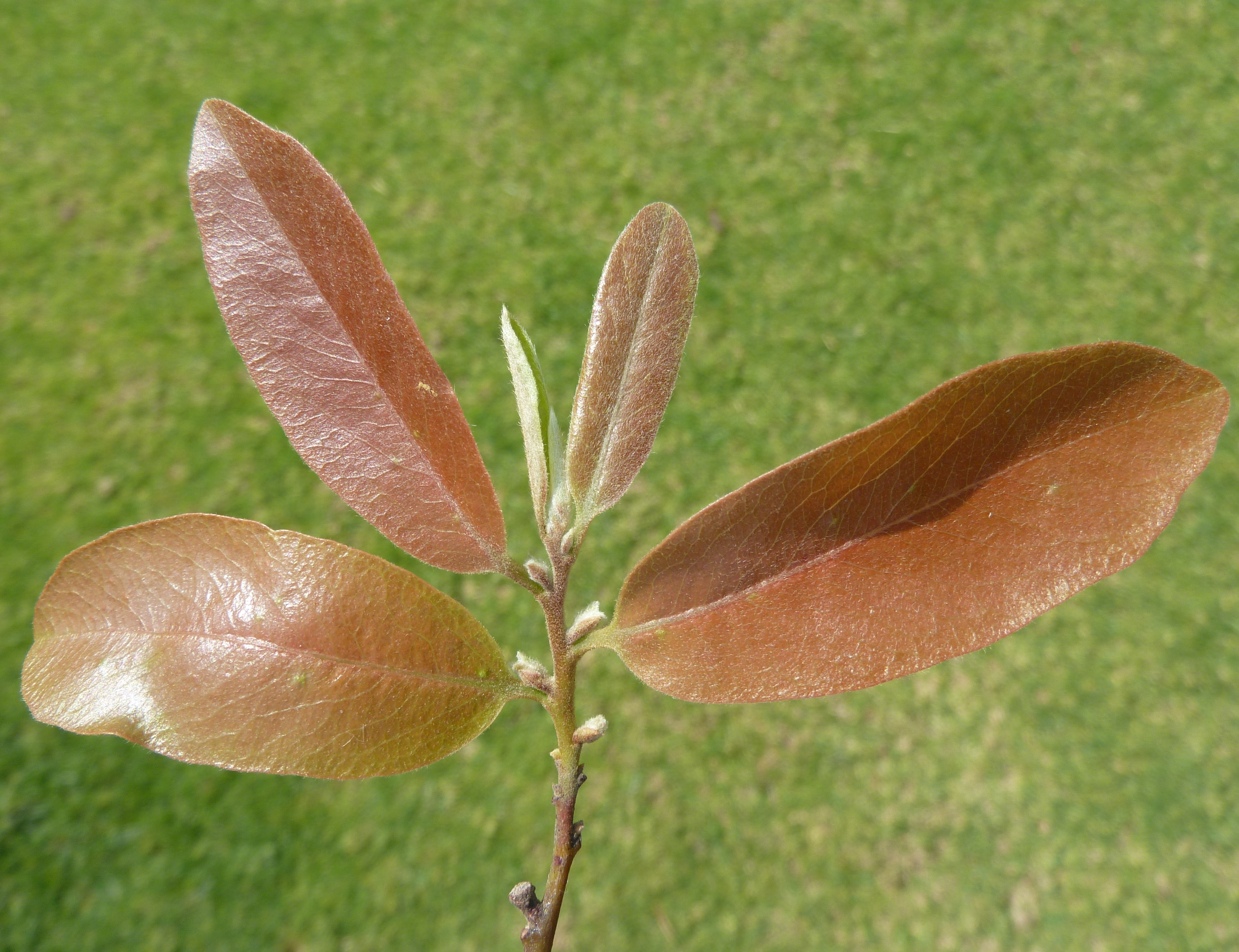
new foliage

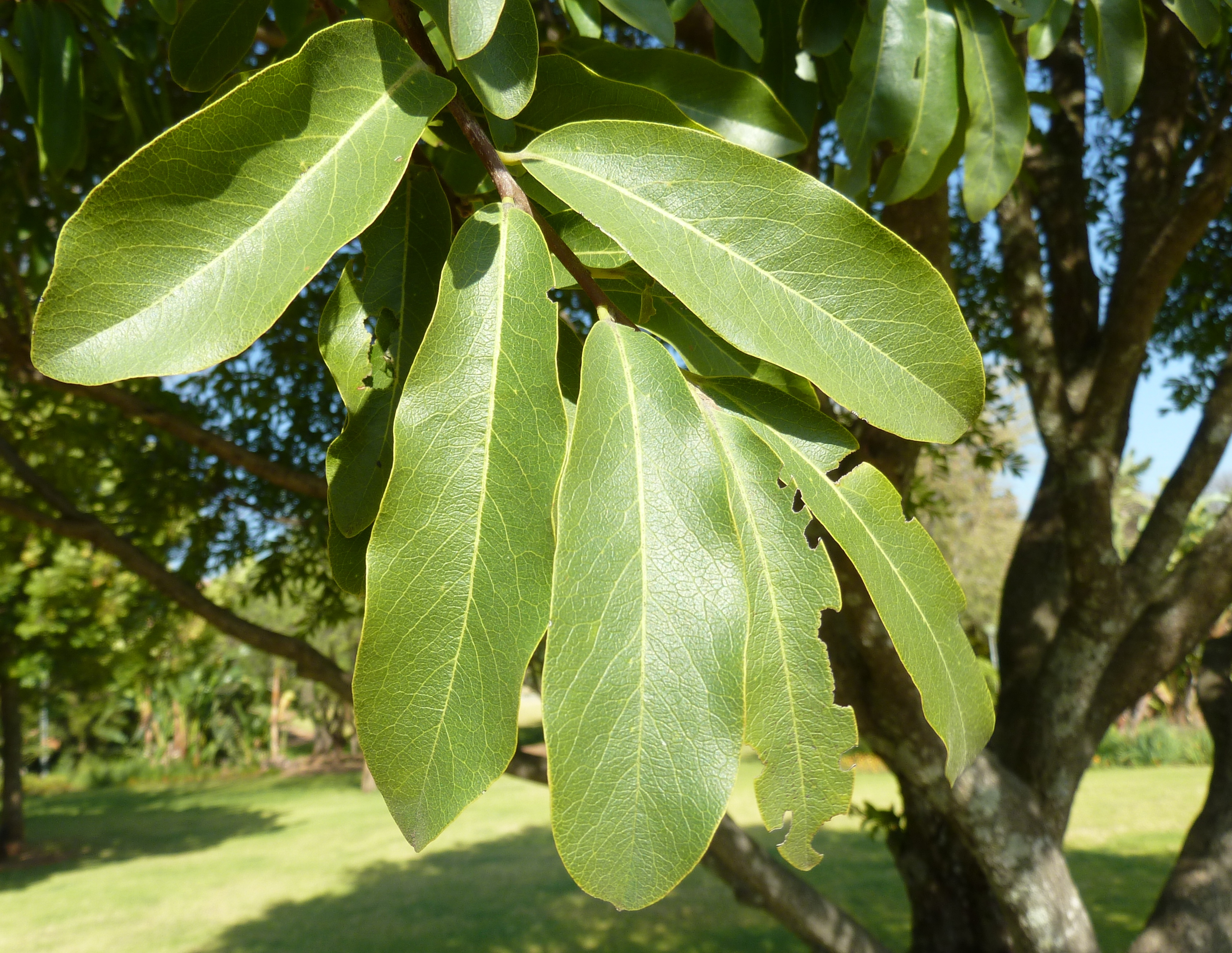
mature foliage
