= Hardap Recreation Resort =

National Park in Namibia

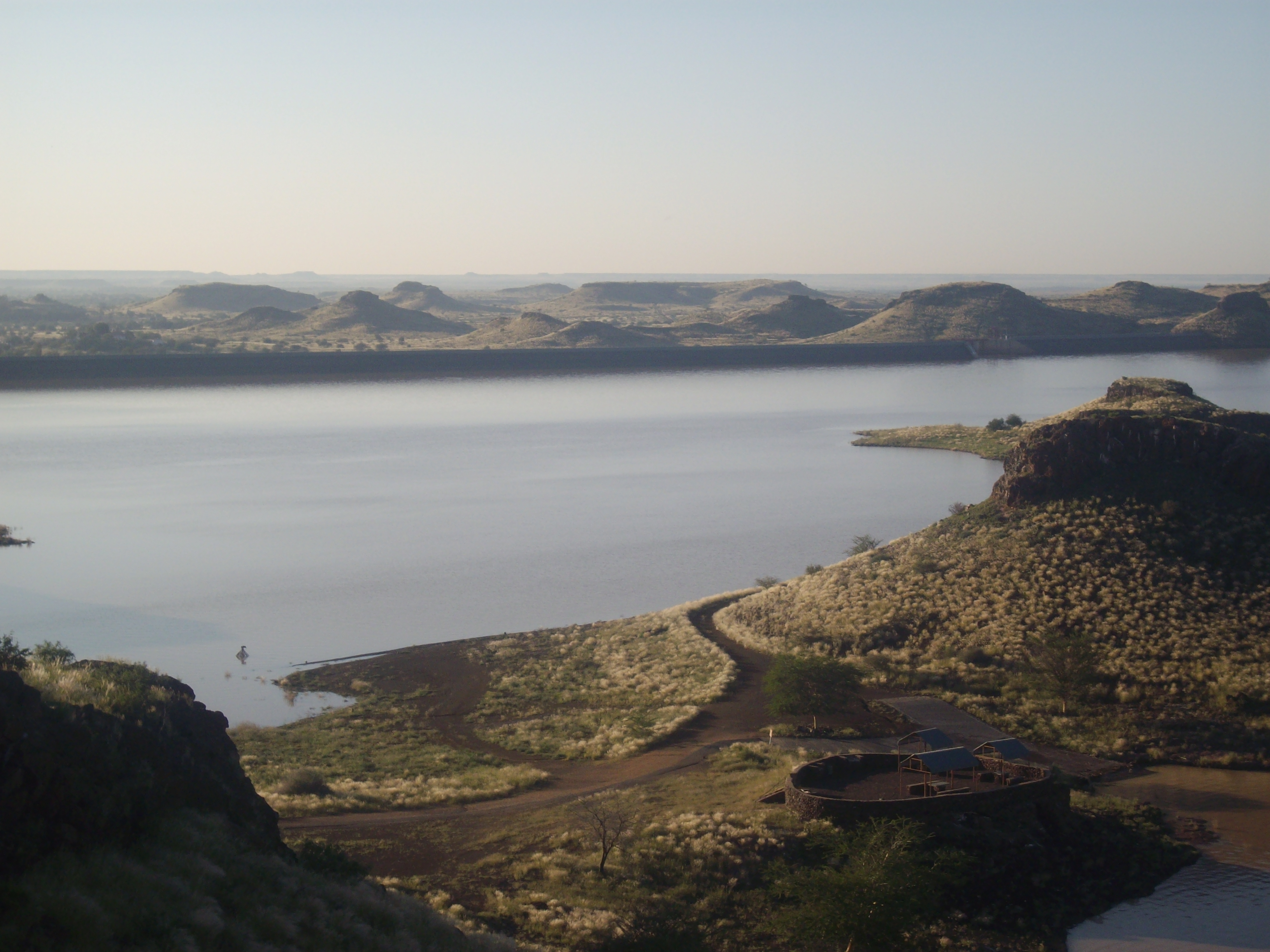

- Location within Namibia
- Location: Namibia
- Coordinates: 24°30′0″S 17°45′0″E
- Area: 252 km^{2} (97 sq mi)
- Established: April 1, 1968
- Governing body: Ministry of Environment and Tourism, Namibia

The Hardap Recreation Resort (also known as Hardap Nature Reserve) is a National Park located in southern Namibia. It was proclaimed in 1968 but a rest camp was opened already in 1964. The park measures 252 square kilometres (97 mi^{2}). Hardap is situated in Hardap Region, about 250 kilometres (160 mi) south of Windhoek and about 24 kilometres (15 mi) west of Mariental. It surrounds the Hardap Dam, Namibia's largest dam, which lies on the Fish River. There is a game park on the southern side of the dam.

== History ==
The name Hardap is derived from the Nama word meaning 'nipple' or 'wart', in reference to the surrounding landscape of low conical shaped hills. Although first investigations to build a dam at Hardap were carried as early as 1897, construction started in 1960 and the dam was completed in 1963. It has a capacity of 320 million m^{3} and a surface area of 25 km^{2}.

== Geography and access ==
The resort is dominated by the Hardap Dam, the Fish and Groot Komatsas rivers. There are open savannah plains and mountainous areas include the Gemsbok Plateau.

== Biology and ecology ==
=== Flora ===
Hardap is in the Nama Karoo Biome and is characterised by Dwarf Shrubland. Common trees include the Shepherd's tree (Boscia albitrunca), camel thorn (Vachellia erioloba, formerly Acacia erioloba), green-hair thorn (Parkinsonia africana), karee or willow rhus (Searsia lancea) and buffalo thorn (Ziziphus mucronata).

=== Fauna ===
Common mammals are kudu, oryx, springbok, steenbok, Hartmann's mountain zebra, red hartebeest and ostrich. There is also a small population of black rhino. Nearly 300 bird species are found here, including Yellow-billed stork, Osprey, African fish eagle, Goliath heron, Bradfield's swift and Stark's lark. The dam has one of the three largest Great white pelican breeding colonies in Namibia.

== Recreation ==
Hardap is a popular angling area. Annual angling competitions are held. Permits are required and are obtained from the Hardap Regional Council office. Water sports such as canoeing and boating are permitted. There are two hiking trails in the park for day hikers. Game drives are permitted in the game park surrounding Hardap Dam, within the Resort area.

Namibia Wildlife Resorts manages accommodation in the Park. Accommodation was upgraded during a four-year, N$40 million renovation period, and the resort reopened on 1 December 2015. Hardap has a restaurant, conference facilities, a swimming pool, 5 VIP Bungalows, 15 self-catering Family Chalets, 30 Bush Chalets, a dormitory and campsites.

== Park management ==
The Ministry of Environment and Tourism is responsible for park management. Invasive plants such as Datura inoxa, Nicotiana glauca and Prosopis glandulosa are a key environmental issue. Incidents of subsistence poaching, involving traps and snares for small antelope are recorded.
