= Caprivi Game Park =

Protected area in north eastern Namibia

Coordinates: 17.9427°S 22.5152°E

Caprivi Game Park is a protected area in north eastern Namibia that is now called Bwabwata National Park. It was proclaimed as the Caprivi Game Reserve in 1966 and upgraded to the Caprivi Game Park in 1968. It was never managed as a game park as the area was a restricted security zone during Namibia's liberation struggle. The South African Police and later the South African Defence Force occupied the area until the implementation of U.N. Resolution 435 in April 1989. The then Department of Nature Conservation appointed the first nature conservation officer and other staff and started work in the area. Many of the area's original Khwe San inhabitants were conscripted into the army and lived on military bases such as Omega. At independence, approximately 5,000 people were living in the Caprivi Game Park. Caprivi Game Park, Mahango Game Reserve and an area known as the Kwando Triangle were incorporated into the Bwabwata National Park, which was proclaimed in 2007.

Since 2005, the park is considered a Lion Conservation Unit together with Khaudum National Park.
