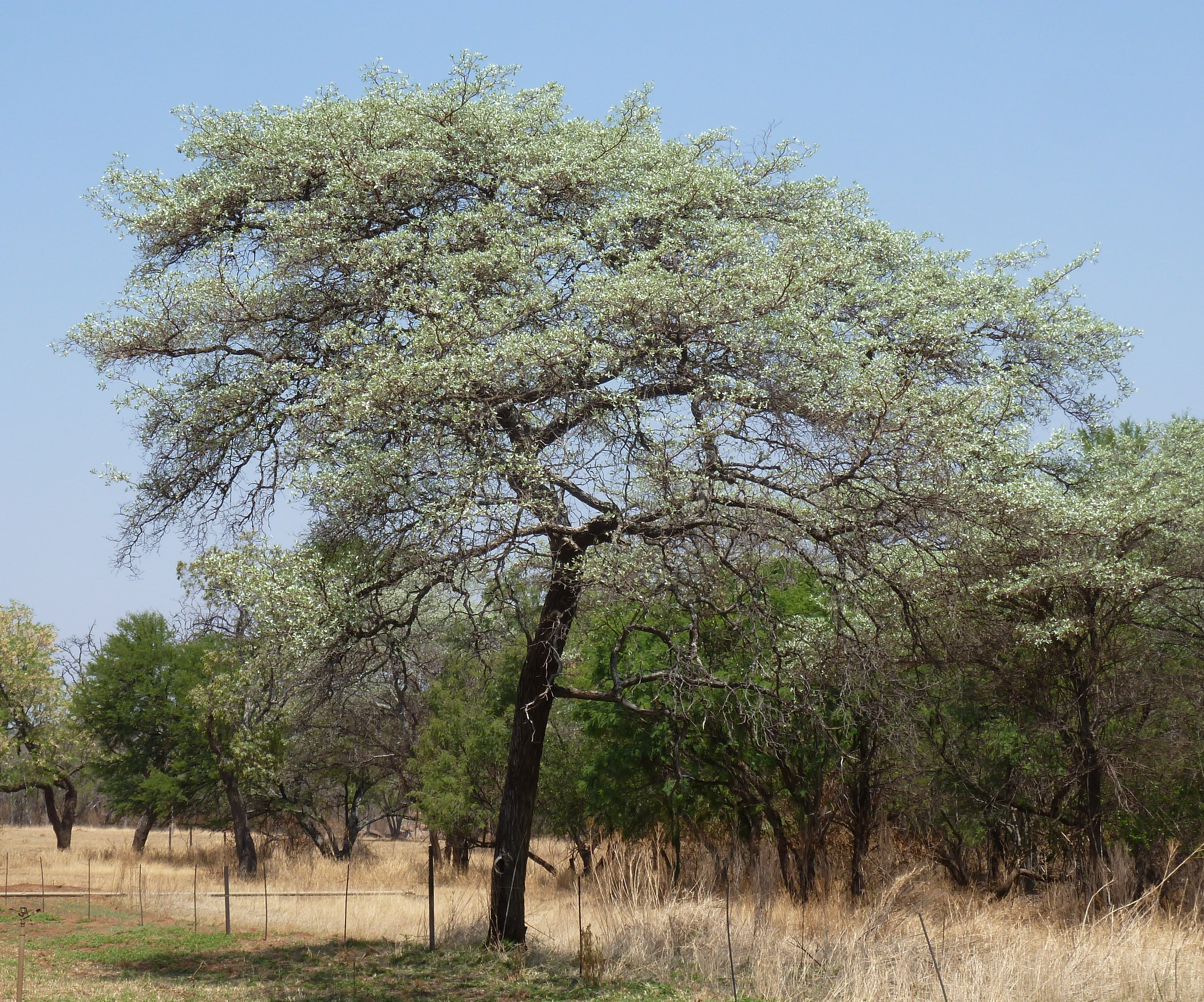

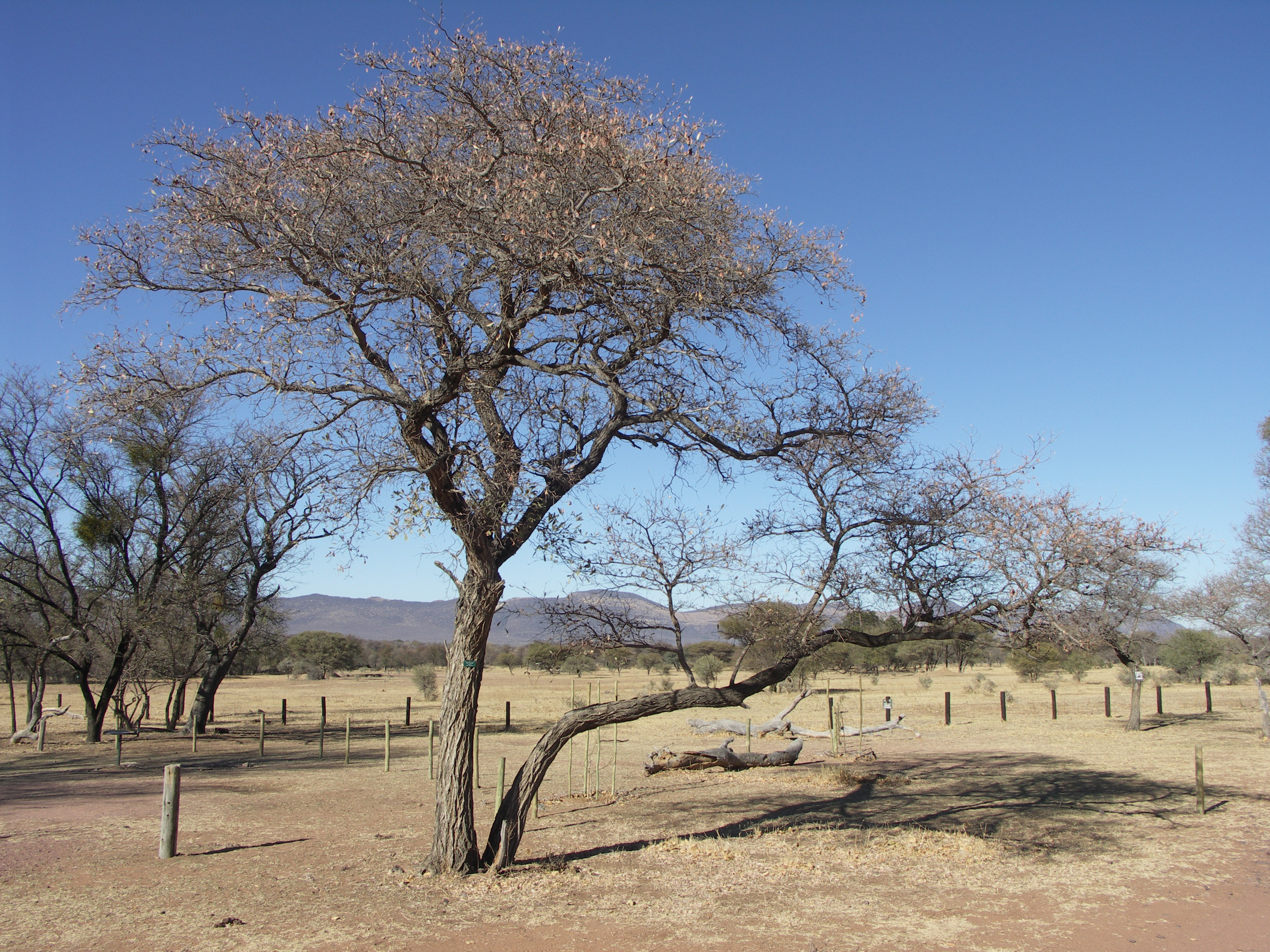
- In spring and winter, South Africa

Scientific classification
- Kingdom: Plantae
- Clade: Tracheophytes
- Clade: Angiosperms
- Clade: Eudicots
- Clade: Rosids
- Order: Myrtales
- Family: Combretaceae
- Genus: Terminalia
- Species: T. sericea

Binomial name
- Terminalia sericea Burch. ex DC.

= Terminalia sericea =

Silver cluster-leaf

Species of tree

Terminalia sericea is a species of deciduous tree of the genus Terminalia that is native to southern Africa. Its common names include clusterleaf, silver cluster-leaf or silver terminalia in English, vaalboom in Afrikaans and mususu in Venda.

== Etymology ==
The generic name is derived from the Latin terminus meaning "boundary" and describes the concentration of the foliage at the very end of the twigs. The specific name "sericea" comes from the Latin sericatus meaning "clothed in silken hair" and describes the downy foliage.

== Description ==
The silver cluster-leaf grows to a height of about 9 metres (30 ft) in woodland but isolated trees can be up to 23 metres (75 ft) tall. The bark is a reddish or greyish brown colour and peels away in strips. The bluish-green leaves tend to be clustered at the tips of the branches. They are ovate with entire margins and both the upper and lower surfaces are clothed in silvery hairs. The flowers are white and are borne in short axilliary spikes. They have an unpleasant smell and may be pollinated by flies. The fruit are winged nuts containing a single seed and turn a darker pink colour as they ripen. They may remain attached to the branch for a year and are dispersed by the wind. They sometimes become contorted and hairy as a result of the activities of parasitic insect larvae.

== Distribution and habitat ==
The silver cluster-leaf is endemic to Africa from Tanzania and the Democratic Republic of Congo southwards to South Africa. It grows in open mixed woodland on sandy soils. It is often found growing with miombo (Brachystegia spp.), mopane (Colophospermum mopane), Acacia spp. and bush willows (Combretum spp.). It is often one of the dominant species in mixed woodland.

== Requirements ==
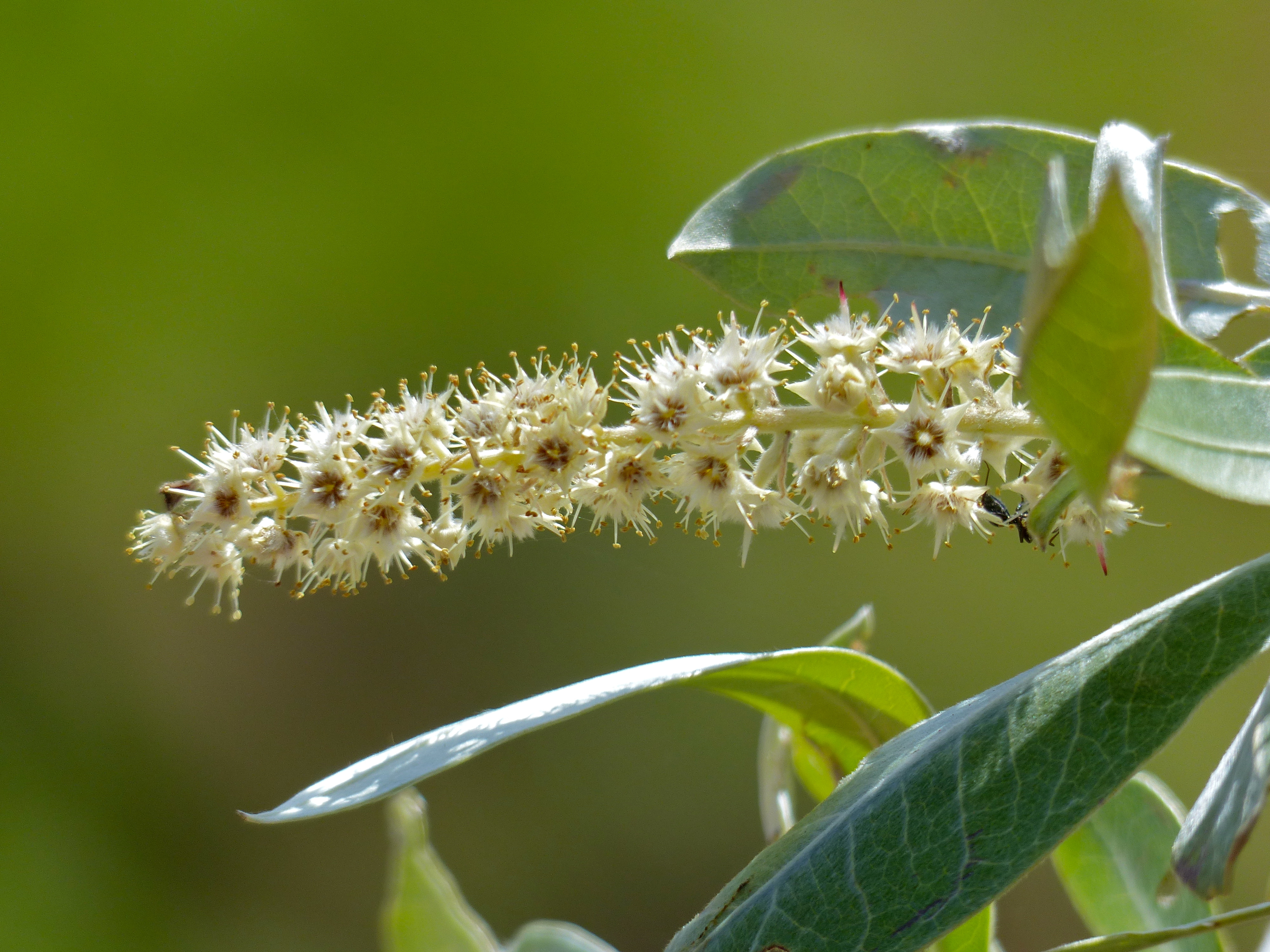
Close-up of the inflorescence, December

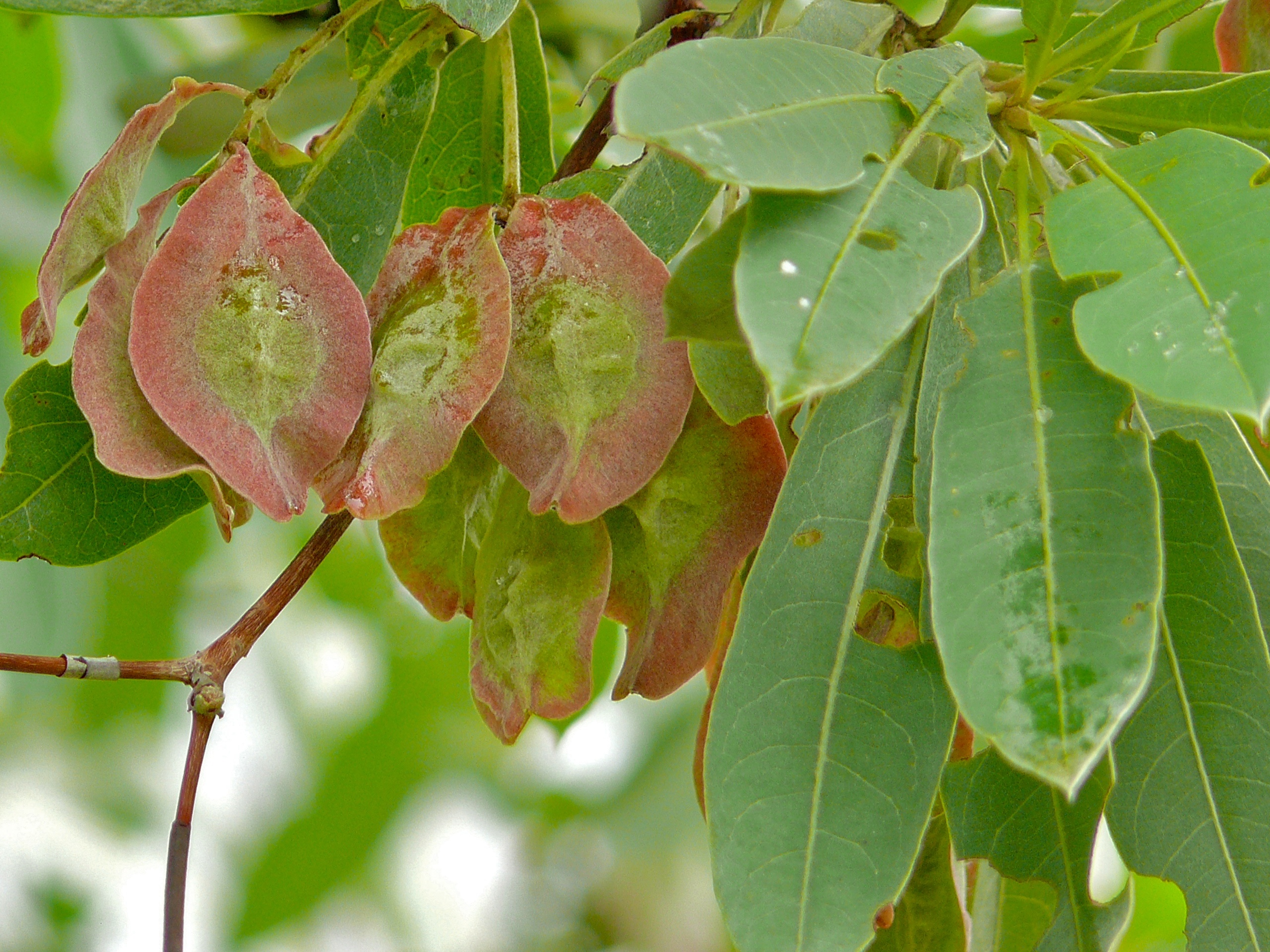
Ripening fruit, February

The silver cluster-leaf grows readily from seed. It is a pioneer species, easily becoming established in previously unwooded areas and may form dense shrubby thickets. In overgrazed areas of southern Africa it encroaches at the expense of the herbaceous layer, which is a process referred to as woody plant encroachment. Its root system is shallow; in Etosha National Park, Namibia, a taproot was found in half of 16 excavated shrubs in the wetter part of the park but in only two of 15 in the drier part, indicating a rooting strategy adapted to local rainfall. In bush-encroached rangeland in north-central Namibia, soils under T. sericea were more acidic and had lower organic matter and nutrient levels than those under Dichrostachys cinerea or Senegalia mellifera, and plots dominated by T. sericea supported 25–35% lower arthropod diversity and richness. It is tolerant of waterlogged soils and of drought conditions and fairly tolerant of saline soils. It needs full light to grow well and tends to shade out weeds so its presence helps climax species to become established. It has been used in land improvement and to control erosion. The leaves are shed in autumn and flowering takes place after the rainy season has started and the new foliage developed. Flowering may be reduced after a bush fire.

== Uses ==
The timber of the silver cluster-leaf is yellow and hard-grained and is resistant to attack by wood-boring insects and termites. It is used in building construction and to make tool handles, furniture and fencing posts. It is used for firewood and the making of charcoal. The bark has been used to make ropes and is also pounded to produce a substance for waterproofing boats. The leaves are eaten by cattle during the dry season when grass becomes unavailable.

In traditional medicine, both leaves and roots have been used as a remedy for stomach ailments and a concoction of the roots for treating bilharzia, diarrhoea and pneumonia. The bark is used against diabetes and to dress wounds.
