= Mangetti National Park =

National park in Namibia, established 2008

- IUCN category II (national park)
- Location within Namibia
- Location: Northern Namibia
- Coordinates: 18°42′25″S 19°07′37″E
- Area: 420 km^{2} (160 sq mi)
- Established: 2008

Mangetti National Park is a national park located in northern Namibia. The park was established in 2008 and has a size of 420 km^{2} (160 sq mi).

It is located around 100 km south-west of Rundu, in the eastern Kalahari woodlands

The park is being managed for the goal of increasing tourism in the region to reduce poverty in Namibia.

== History ==
The area was previously used for breeding rare and endangered animals.

== See also ==
- List of national parks of Namibia
