= Cuando River =

River in south-central Africa

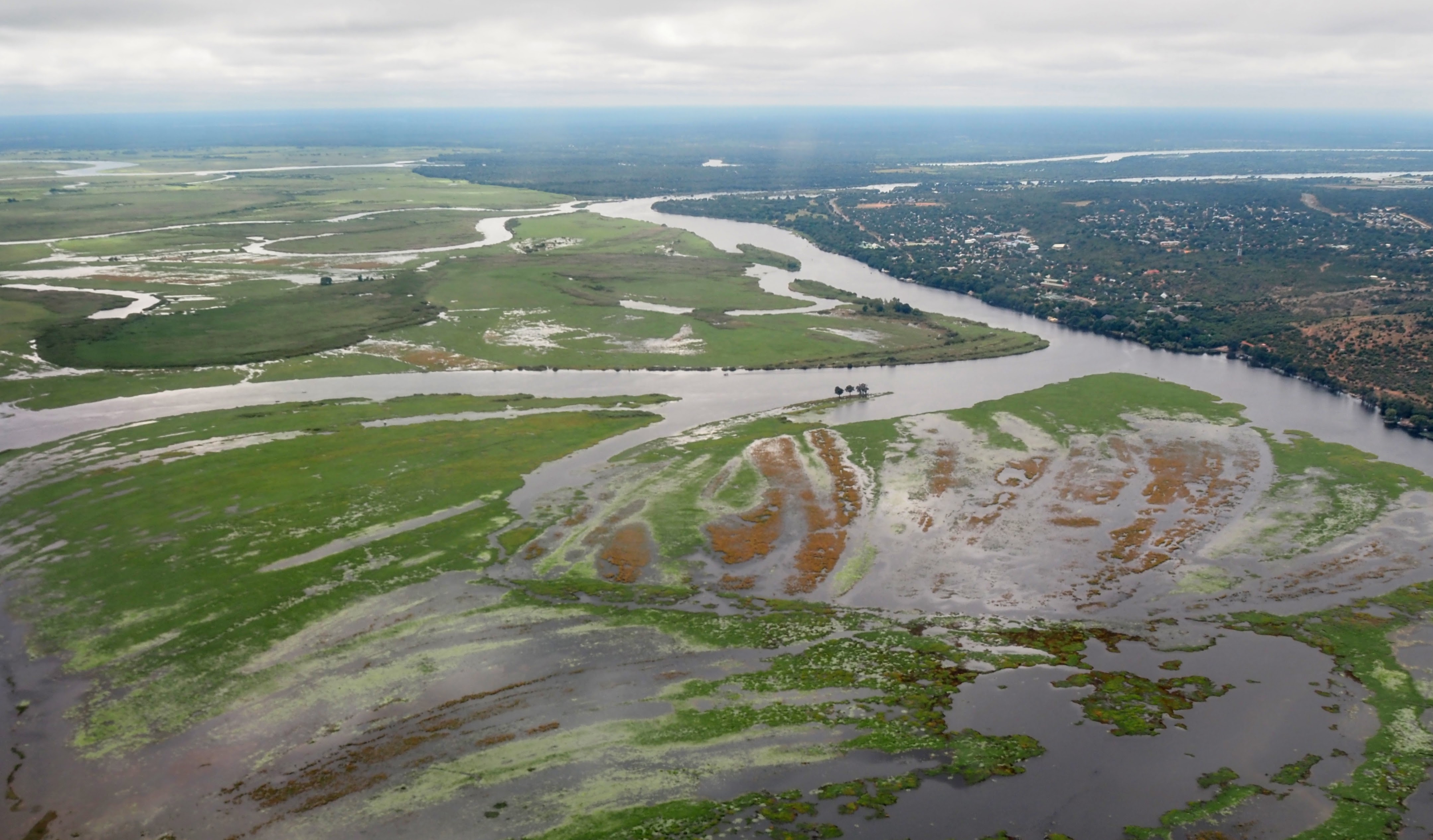
- Chobe River at Kasane

- The Cuando basin

Location
- Countries: Angola; Namibia; Zambia; Botswana

Physical characteristics
- Source: Mount Tembo
  - location: Lutuai, Moxico Province, Angola
  - coordinates: 13°00′08″S 19°07′16″E
  - elevation: 1,359 m (4,459 ft)
- Mouth: Zambezi River
  - location: Caprivi Region, Namibia and Chobe District, Botswana
  - coordinates: 18°30′08″S 23°36′58″E
  - elevation: 943 m (3,094 ft)
- Length: 731 km (454 mi)
- Basin size: 96,778 km^{2} (37,366 sq mi)

Basin features
- Progression: Zambezi River → Indian Ocean

The Cuando (or Kwando) is a river in south-central Africa flowing through Angola and Namibia's Caprivi Strip and into the Linyanti Swamp on the northern border of Botswana. Below the swamp, the river is called the Linyanti River and, farther east, the Chobe River, before it flows into the Zambezi River.

== Course ==
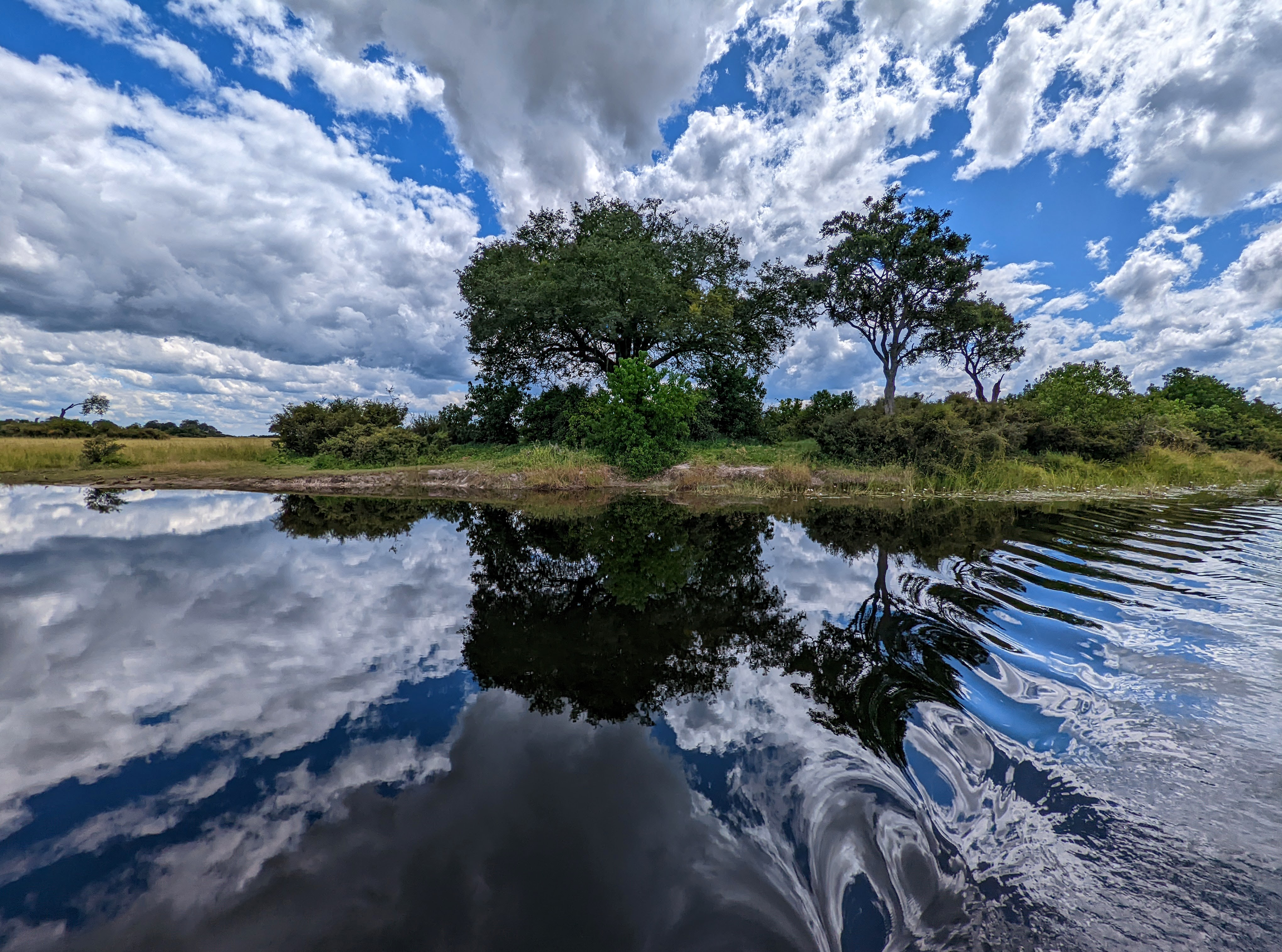
A bit of Namibia as seen from the Linyanti River

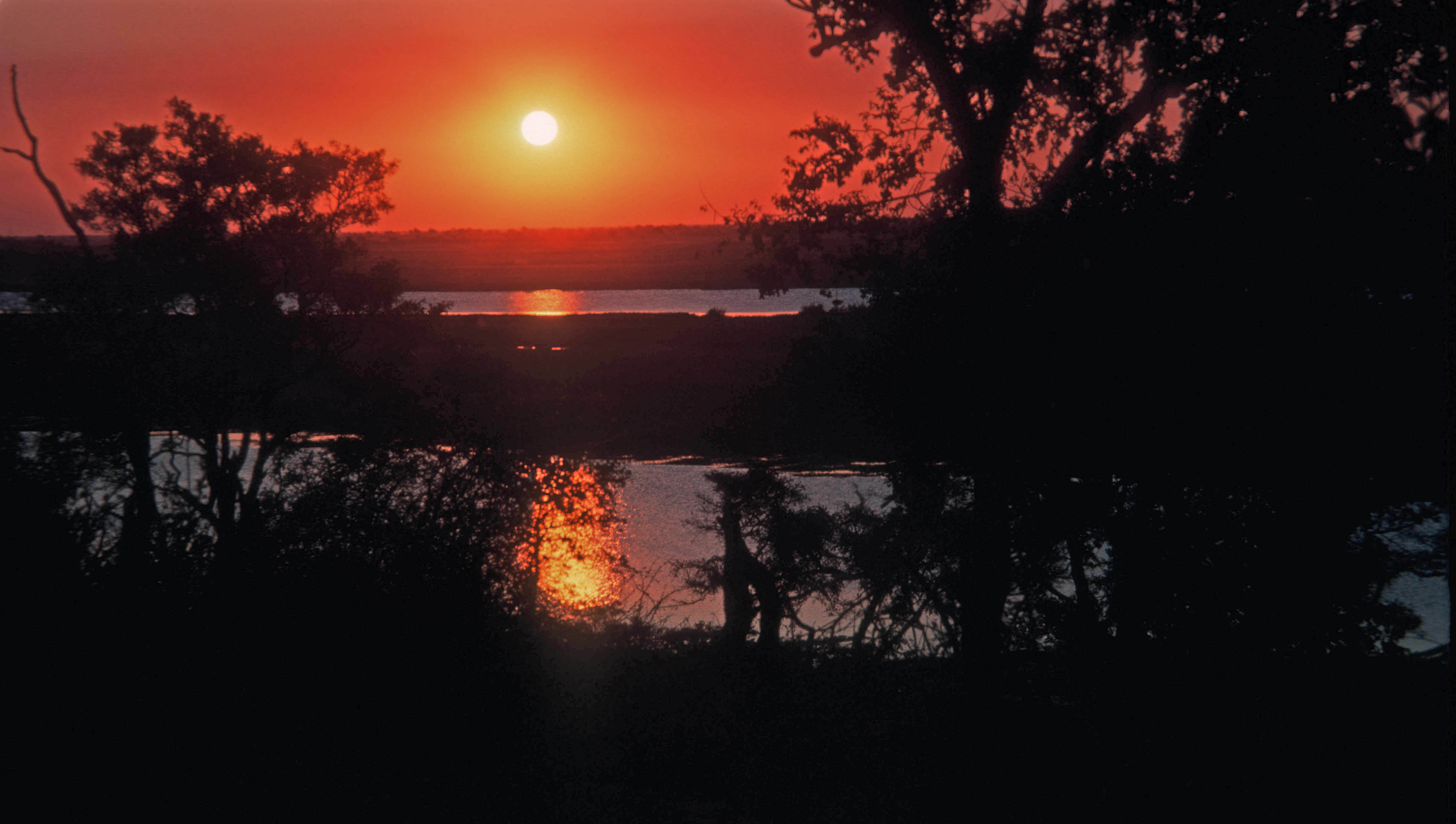
Sunset over the Chobe River in Botswana's Chobe National Park

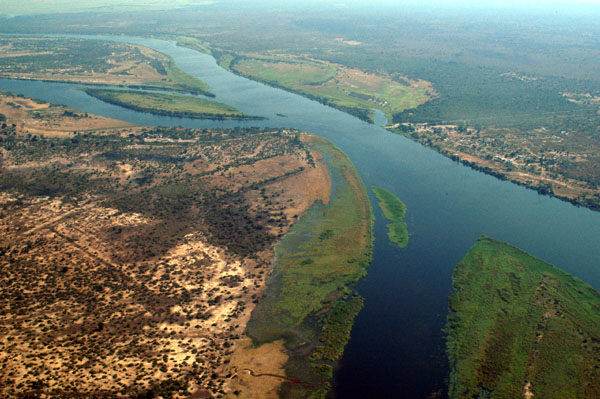
Aerial photo of the confluence of the Kuando (Chobe) River (centre left) and the Zambezi River at Kazungula (map, 9) looking west, at Africa's "four corners", where Namibia, Zambia, Zimbabwe, and Botswana meet

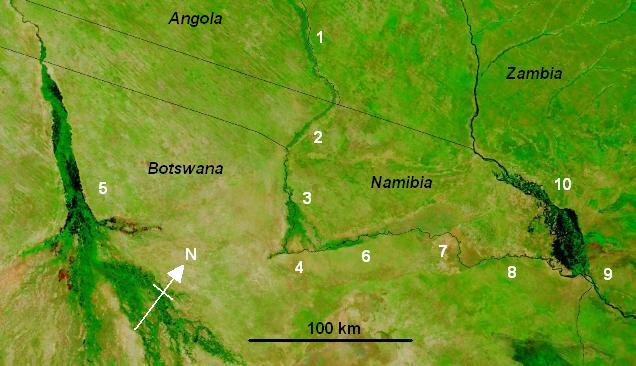
Map of the Cuando-Linyanti-Chobe river system in the region of Namibia's Caprivi Strip based on a NASA satellite photo (note orientation with north-west at top). Water shows black. 1 The Cuando River; 2 Caprivi Strip; 3 Mudumu National Park and Lianshulu Lodge, the end of the Linyanti Swamp; 4 Linyanti Swamp and Mamli National Park, where a ridge of Kalahari sand blocks flow to the south-east; 5 Okavango River and delta which sinks into the Kalahari sands; 6 Linyanti River; 7 Lake Liambezi (dry when photo was taken); 8 Chobe River; 9 Confluence of Chobe and Zambezi at Kazungula; 10 Zambezi and Caprivi Swamps were experiencing an extreme flood at the time of the photo

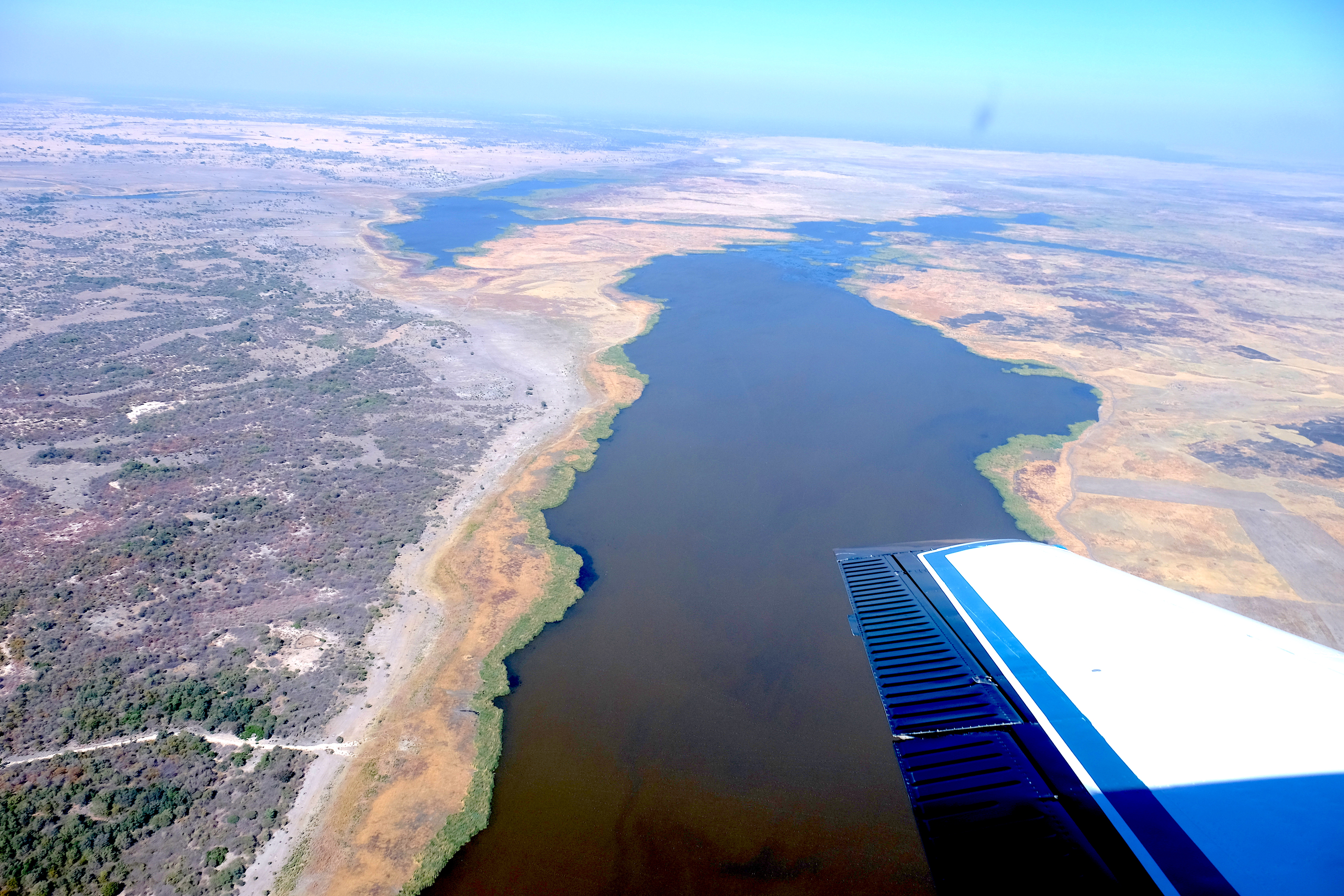
Lake Liambesi

The Cuando rises in the central plateau of Angola on the slopes of Mount Tembo, thence flowing southeast along the Zambian border. Along this reach it flows in a maze of channels in a swampy corridor 5–10 km wide (map 1: the border with Zambia is the eastern bank of this floodplain, not the river channel). As with all rivers in south-central Africa, its flow varies enormously between the rainy season when it floods and may be several kilometres wide, and the dry season when it may disappear into marshes.

The Cuando continues in its marshy channel across the neck of the Caprivi Strip of Namibia (map, 2) and then forms the border between Namibia and Botswana as it continues southeast. Some 10,000 years ago, the Cuando merged with the Okavango River and they flowed south to Lake Makgadikgadi (which is a seasonal wetland in current times), but the land in that area was uplifted. As a consequence the Cuando now meets slightly higher ground (map, 4) and breaks up into many channels and swamps (called the Linyanti Swamp) dotted with alluvial islands, nearly disappearing into the Kalahari sands like the Okavango (map, 5). But instead it has diverted east and has been captured by the Zambezi. The flow turns sharply east, still forming the border with Botswana. In the dry season there are few open channels through the swamps and marshes. Beginning at this point it is known as the Linyanti (map, 6), and after it flows through a seasonal lake, Lake Liambesi (map, 7), it is called the Chobe (map, 8). The river then flows into the Zambezi just above the former Kazungula Ferry (map, 9), now replaced by the Kazungula Bridge.

In years when the Okavango experiences a good flood some of the water escapes east along the normally dry channel of the Magwekwana River (also known as Selinda Spillway) into the Linyanti Swamp, thus entering the Zambezi basin. The Selinda Spillway and the Boteti River are the only outlets of the Okavango basin.

On the north side of the Chobe River are the Caprivi Swamps, on the edge of which is the ruined capital of the Kololo people who conquered Barotseland in the 19th century.

So much of the water of the Cuando, Linyanti and Chobe is lost to evaporation in the various swamps that its contribution to the flow of the Zambezi is very small except in occasional years when it floods excessively.

The perennial river bifurcation of Selinda Spillway (or Magweggana River), on the Cuando River, connects the Kalahari Basin to the Zambezi Basin.

== Wildlife ==
The Cuando system is noted for its wildlife and for most of its length the land either side is protected as game reserves or wildlife management areas. Some of these suffered poaching during wars and conflict in Namibia and Angola, but with peace restored in those countries they have the chance of returning to their former state.

The national parks through which the Cuando passes or on which it borders are:

- Coutada Publica do Luiana (Angola)
- Sioma Ngwezi National Park (Zambia)
- Bwabwata National Park (Namibia)
- Mudumu National Park (Namibia)
- Nkasa Rupara National Park (Namibia)
- Chobe National Park (Botswana)

== Sources ==
- "Afrique Centre et Sud", Carte Routiere et Touristique Michelin, Paris (1996)
- C. Michael Hogan (2008) Makgadikgadi, ed. A. Burnham, Makgadikgadi Ancient Village or Settlement, The Megalithic Portal and Megalith Map: http://www.megalithic.co.uk/article.php?sid=22373&mode=&order=0
- Robert Mepham, R. H. Hughes, G. M. Bernacsek (1992) A Directory of African Wetlands, International Union for Conservation of Nature and Natural Resources, United Nations Environment Programme, World Conservation Monitoring Centre, 820 pages ISBN 2-88032-949-3
