= Nkasa Rupara National Park =

National park of Namibia

- IUCN category II (national park)
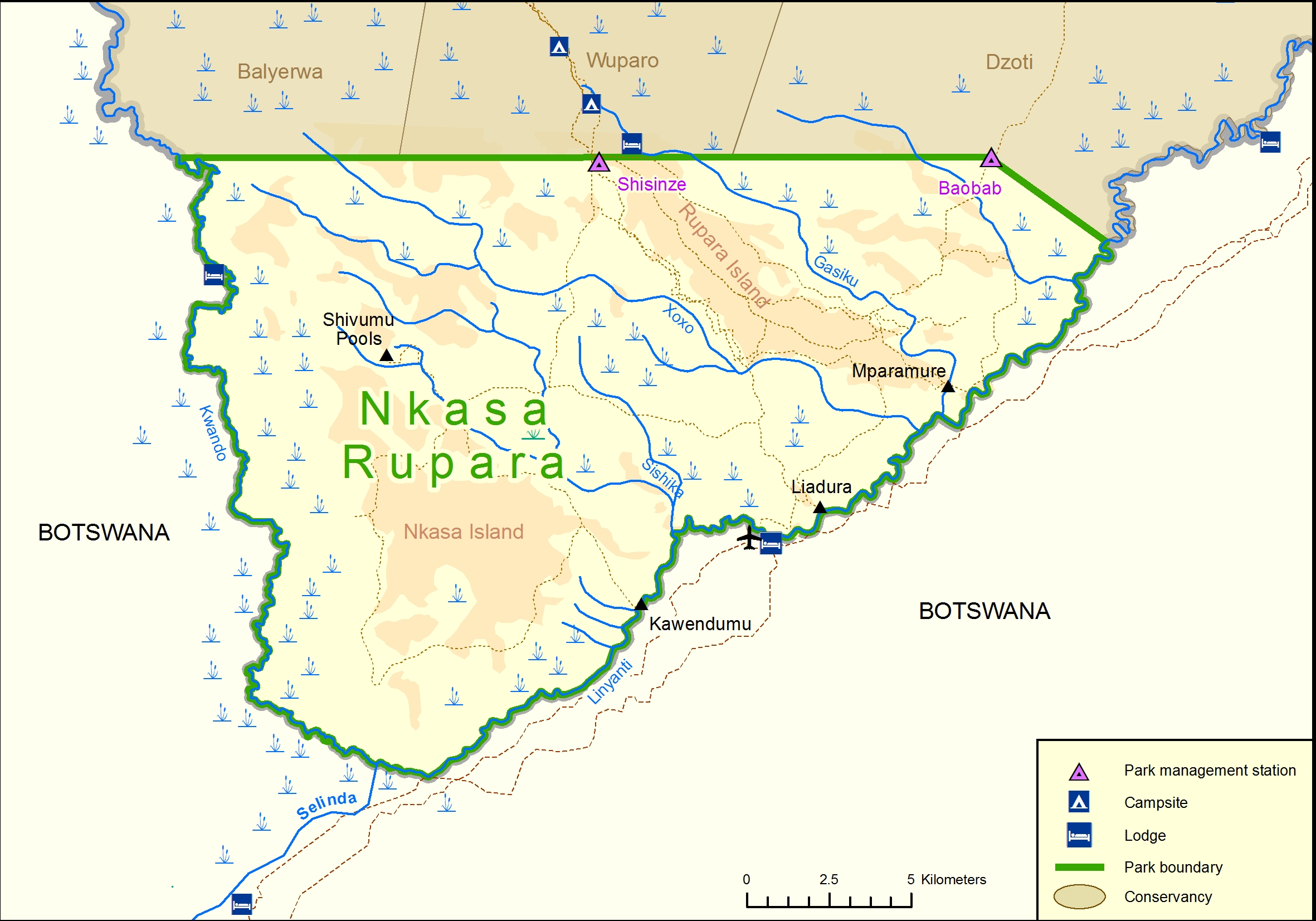
- Nkasa Rupara (formerly: Mamili) National Park

- Location within Namibia
- Location: Namibia
- Coordinates: 18.40°S 23.65°E
- Area: 320 km^{2} (120 sq mi)
- Established: 1990

Nkasa Rupara National Park, also Nkasa Lupala National Park, formerly Mamili National Park, is a national park in Namibia. It is centered on the Nkasa and Rupara islands on the Kwando/Linyanti River in the south-western corner of East Caprivi. Botswana lies to the west, south and east, and Sangwali village to the north. It is Namibia's largest formally protected wetland area. It is one of Namibia’s protected areas that benefits local communities surrounding parks. The unfenced park forms a trans-boundary link for wildlife migration between Angola, Botswana, Namibia and Zambia. Nkasa Rupara is part of the Kavango Zambezi Transfrontier Conservation Area (KaZa TFCA).

== History ==
Mamili National Park was officially proclaimed along with the nearby Mudumu National Park on 1 March 1990. In 2012, the Namibian Government renamed the area as Nkasa Rupara National Park.

The former name, Mamili, referred to a family of traditional leaders of the Mafwe tribe with that surname. The new name, Nkasa Lupala, is a reference to two Kwando River islands within the park's territory.

== Geography and access ==
The Kwando River runs along Nkasa Rupara’s western border and then changes course to become the Linyanti River, forming the park’s south-eastern boundary. It is the same river but is known by different names in various areas. The northern border abuts the Balyewa, Wuparo and Dzoti communal area conservancies The entire area is flat. Most of the park consists of channels of reed beds, lagoons and islands. Nkasa Rupara has relatively narrow, permanently filled main channels of the Kwando/Linyanti River and several periodically flooded channels. The river has its catchment area in Angola and flooding regimes vary considerably. This results in flooding in some years and dry spells during others. To access Nkasa Rupara National Park turn off the B8 Trans-Caprivi Highway, onto the D3511 after the Kongola Bridge. The only entrance track crosses a bridge over a back-channel of the Kwando/Linyanti River, near Sangwali village in Wuparo Conservancy. Rupara Island is reached via a dirt track; Nkasa Island in not reachable because the access is flooded.

== Climate ==
Rainfall: 600 mm (24 in) – 700 mm (28 in) per annum (variable). Temperature: 5 °C (41 °F) - 35 °C (95 °F).

== Biology and ecology ==
Nkasa Rupara National Park contains Namibia’s most extensive wetlands, marshes and seasonally inundated areas. Ecosystem types are similar to the Okavango Delta wetlands and habitats. Periodic flooding drives the park’s ecosystem. Caprivi floodplains dominate. Various trees are found on small islands consisting of old termite mounds known as termitaria.

=== Flora ===
Nkasa Rupara is found in the broadleaved tree and wood savanna biome; vegetation type is Caprivi floodplains. Woody vegetation is found on higher islands that are rarely flooded. Examples of common woodland species are knob thorn (Senegalia nigrescens), paper-bark acacia (Vachellia sieberiana), large-leaved albizia (Albizia versicolor), monkey bread (Piliostigma thonningii), leadwood (Combretum imberbe), sausage tree (Kigelia africana) and silver cluster-leaf (Terminalia sericea).

=== Fauna ===
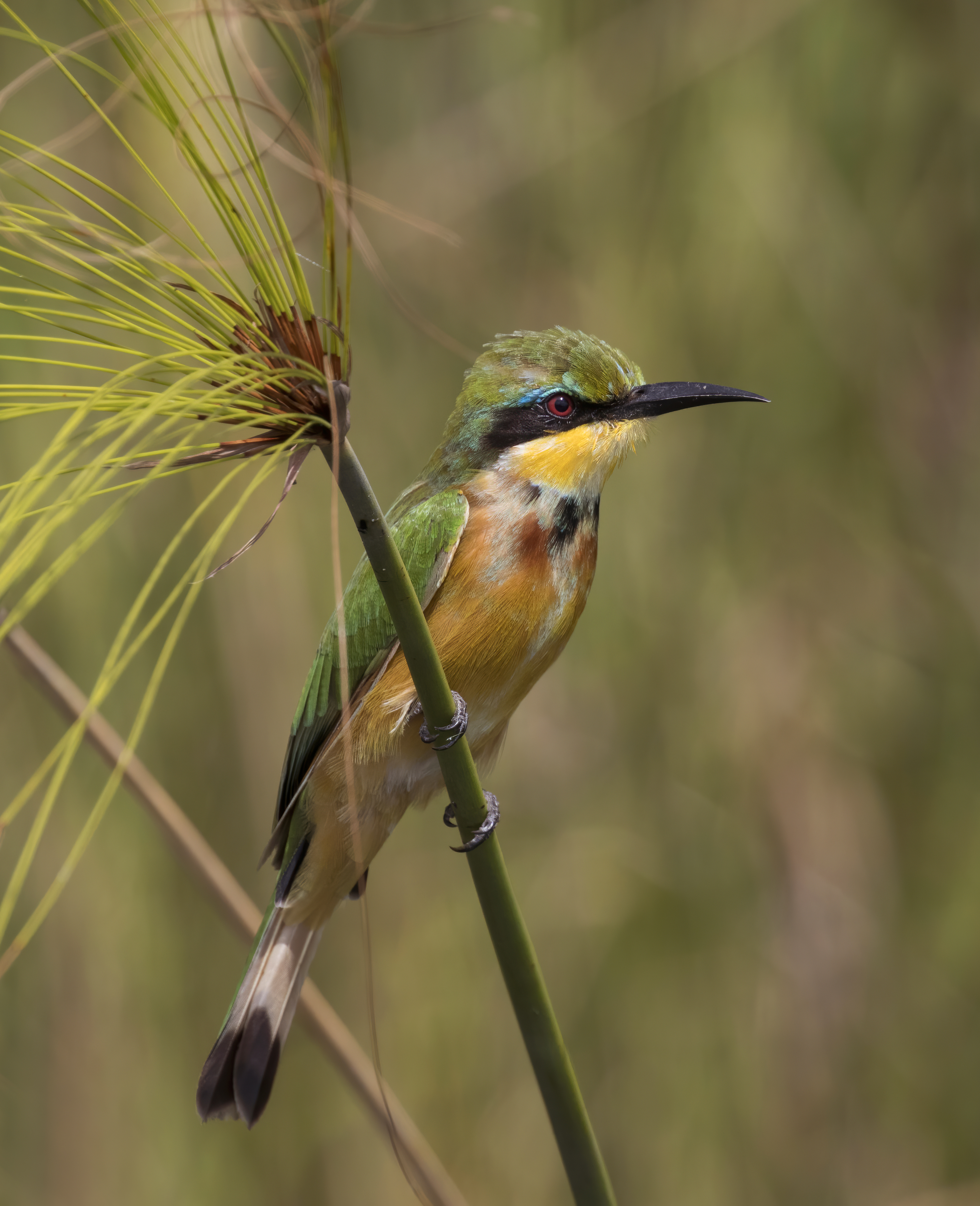
A Little bee-eater

Nkasa Rupara forms a corridor for all large mammal species moving between Namibia and Botswana, particularly African elephant and buffalo. There are about 1 000 buffalo in Nkasa Rupara, the largest concentration in Namibia. Around 560 hippopotami and 500 crocodile occur in the park’s rivers and channels. Rare antelope species include sitatungas, pukus, red lechwe, reedbucks and oribis. Mammals of this park as well as reptiles feature elephants, lions, cheetahs, leopards, spotted hyenas, African wild dogs, roan antelopes, impala, kudus, warthogs, baboons, spotted-necked otters, rock monitor lizards and water monitor lizards.

About 450 bird species have been counted. Several rare, vulnerable and endangered species are found here, such as wattled crane, Pel’s fishing-owl, black-cheeked lovebird and yellow-billed oxpecker. Other birds are Stanley's bustard, rosy-throated longclaw, Dickinson's kestrel, Allen’s gallinule, lesser jacana, black-winged and red-winged pratincole, long-toed lapwing, Luapula cisticola, coppery-tailed coucal and black coucal.

== Fires ==
Lightning or human-caused fires occur seasonally. They are important for the park’s ecology, regulating the dominance of tall grass stands and keeping woody plants at bay.

== Recreation ==
At least two all-wheel drive vehicles are needed as the terrain can be muddy and waterlogged. Nkasa Rupara is situated in a malaria area. Park fees must be either pre-paid at the Ministry of Environment and Tourism (MET) offices in Katima Mulilo, Windhoek or upon arrival. Nkasa Rupara has minimal facilities. There are no shops, filling stations or other facilities in the park. Visitors must be self-sufficient. There is a community campsite on the park’s northern border. The Nkasa Lupala tented lodge was built recently as part of a tourism concession granted by the Namibian Government. It is a partnership with the Wuparo Conservancy, which also runs a community campsite outside the park.

== Kavango Zambezi Transfrontier Conservation Area ==
Angola, Botswana, Namibia, Zambia and Zimbabwe have agreed to manage trans-boundary conservation through the Kavango–Zambezi Transfrontier Conservation Area (KaZa TFCA). Nkasa Rupara is situated in the centre of the KaZa TFCA and forms a corridor for elephant, buffalo, roan and sable antelope movement from Botswana into Angola and Zambia. KaZa includes 22 protected areas which cover 280 000 square kilometers. KaZa aims to broaden the protected areas network, increase biodiversity, expand historical game migration routes and draw more tourists to the area. In a place where local people often bear the costs of living with wildlife, KAZA aims to make the protection of wildlife and wild places economically more attractive to rural communities.

== Park management ==
Nkasa Rupara National Park is one of five national parks in north-eastern Namibia. It is managed as a unit with Bwabwata National Park, Khaudum National Park, Mangetti National Park and Mudumu National Park.

Since 2006, the NamParks Project (formerly BMM Parks Project), co-funded by the Federal Republic of Germany through KfW, has helped develop these parks. Funding has been used to set up tourism, business and management plans, improve infrastructure, translocate animals back into their natural habitat and develop partnerships between Government and communities to manage parks with other land units. Nkasa Rupara National Park forms part of the Mudumu South complex. Complexes group formally protected areas, conservancies and forestry management areas into single units to manage resources across park and conservancy boundaries. Stakeholders work together on law enforcement and anti-poaching, fire management (early burning), game monitoring and wildlife translocations. This approach is known as integrated park management.

A park management plan guides activities in Nkasa Rupara.

== Park development ==
A ranger station is situated at Shizinze. Staff of Namibia’s Ministry of Environment and Tourism (MET) carry out patrols, monitor and count game and control poaching. It works closely with local conservancies to manage and protect this park. NamParks Project and the MET funded a new bridge to improve access to the park and have bought vehicles and equipment for patrols. Nkasa Rupara has several tourism and hunting concessions. These provide income for the State and for neighbouring communities. A tourism lodge benefits surrounding communities.

== See also ==
- Kavango Zambezi Transfrontier Conservation Area
