= Khaudum National Park =

National park in Namibia

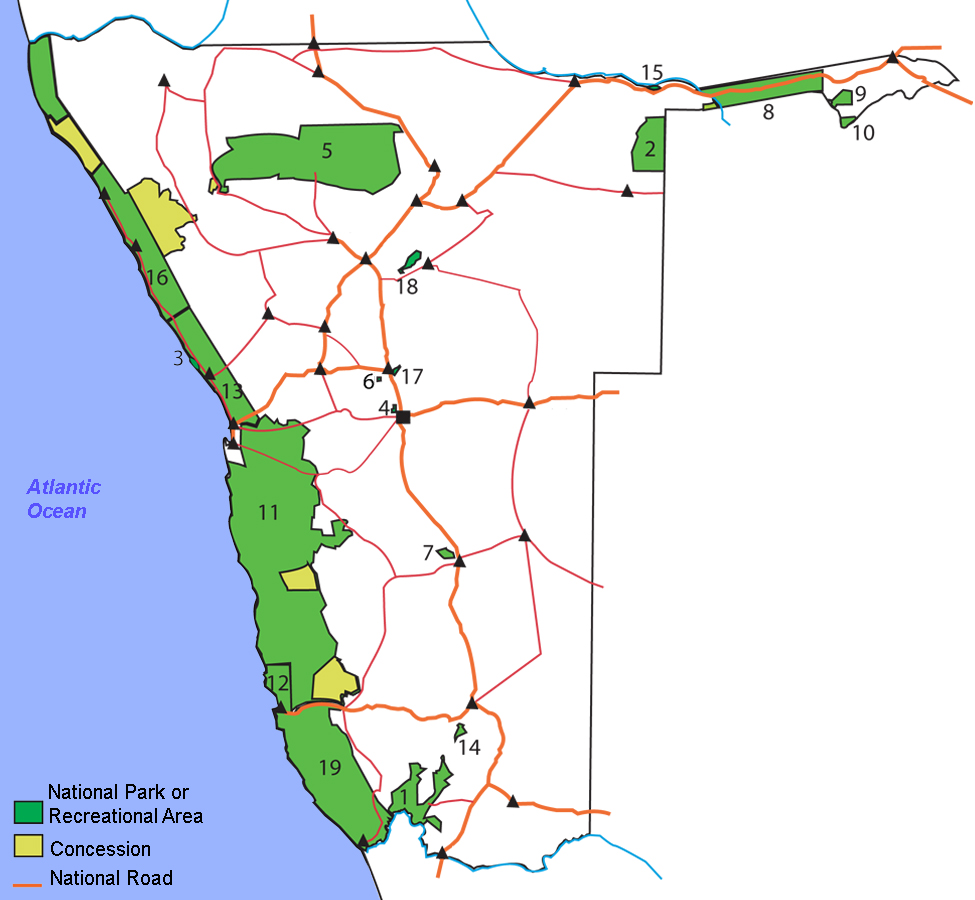
- Namibia national parks, with Khaudum on the Botswana border

- Location within Namibia

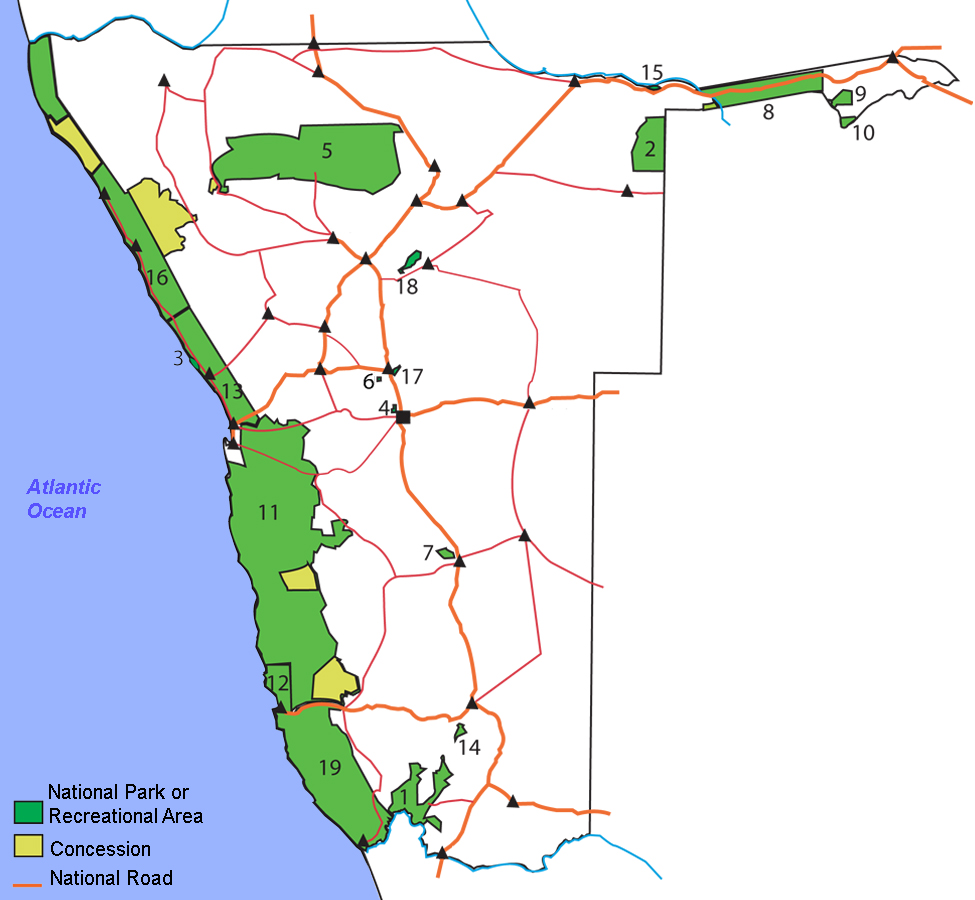
- Nearest city: Tsumkwe (65 km (40 mi))
- Coordinates: 18.85438°S 20.61689°E
- Area: 3,842 km^{2} (1,483 sq mi)
- Governing body: Namibia Tourism Board
- Website: namibiatourism.com.na/page/national-parks

Khaudum National Park is a national park in the Kalahari Desert in northeastern Namibia to the west of the Caprivi Strip. It is remote and inaccessible, home to the lion and hyena.

== Geography ==
The Khaudum National Park is located in the Kalahari Desert. The three largest dry rivers known as Omuramba—Nhoma, Cwiba and Khaudum River run through the national park. They play an important ecological role when they are in flood during the rainy season.

== Climate ==
In the dry season in winter, the humidity is around 30% and the daily maximum daytime temperatures are above 25 °C (77 °F). The temperature on cold nights can fall to less than 5 °C (41 °F), but is usually around 12 °C (54 °F). The rainy season in summer is marked by a humidity of 60% and daily highs are typically between 30–40 °C (86–104 °F). Even at night the temperature does not fall below 15 °C (59 °F). The annual precipitation average is 550 mm (22 in), with 80% from December to March. The Kavango East Region has a long, dry season from April to November and a subsequent wet period from December to March. The climate is in the BSh category, on the Köppen climate classification scale.

== Vegetation ==
The dominant vegetation in the park is species-rich, high and short dry forest and dry acacia forest. Trees can reach a height of up to 10 m (33 ft) and have a relatively dense undergrowth. The species range includes Pterocarpus angolensis, Baikiaea plurijuga, Burkea africana and Guibourtia coleosperma. In contrast to the dry high forest, the trees in the lower forest reach less than 5 meters in height. Species include Lonchocarpus neisii and Terminalia sericea, interspersed with Faidherbia albida and Grewia. Along the Omuramba is denser acacia dry forest, often with very large populations of thorn bushes including Acacia erioloba, Acacia fleckii, Acacia hebeclada, and Acacia tortilis together with the occasional Combretum imberbe and Combretum hereroense. The bed of the Omuramba is peaty-boggy and consists of dense Reed including Phragmites and more infrequently, water lilies. Terminalia prunioides (blood fruit trees) also dominate.

== Fauna ==
Since 2005, the protected area is considered a Lion Conservation Unit together with the Caprivi Game Park.

The unspoiled nature of the reserve encourages a rich and varied wildlife in the dry forest. The ideal time for seeing wildlife is from June to October. From November to March, more than 320 species of birds inhabit the area, including parrots and more than 50 species of birds of prey.

Big game can be found in the park occasionally, more than 500 African bush elephants, many Angolan giraffes and many antelope, including roan antelope, kudu, lyre antelope, common eland and reedbuck. The stock of prey animals is also high. Besides the smaller cats, there is a larger population of lions, but also African leopards, spotted hyenas, jackals, occasionally cheetahs and even African wild dogs.

== Tourism ==
Khaudum, though very isolated, does see a large number of tourists every year. Initially, only two camps were open to visitors, but both camps and the whole park were closed in May 2013. In 2015, the Khaudum campsite was privatized and completely renovated. It now offers six shaded camping areas near the Xaudum Lodge.
