= Namibia at the 2025 World Aquatics Championships =

- Flag of Namibia
- World Aquatics code: NAM
- National federation: Namibia Swimming Union

in Singapore
- Competitors: 6 in 4 sports
- Medals: Gold 0 Silver 0 Bronze 0 Total 0

World Aquatics Championships appearances
- 1994; 1998; 2001; 2003; 2005; 2007; 2009; 2011; 2013; 2015; 2017; 2019; 2022; 2023; 2024; 2025

Namibia competed at the 2025 World Aquatics Championships in Singapore from 11 July to 3 August 2025.

== Competitors ==
The following is the list of competitors in the Championships.

Sport	Men	Women	Total
Open water swimming	2	2	4
Swimming	2	0	2
Total	4	2	6

== Open water swimming ==
Men

Athlete	Event	Heats		Semi-final		Final	
Athlete	Event	Time	Rank	Time	Rank	Time	Rank
Nico Esslinger	Men's 3 km knockout sprints	17:52.4	19	Did not advance			
Tristan Nell	Men's 3 km knockout sprints	20:38.1	28	Did not advance			
Nico Esslinger	Men's 5 km	—				1:02:47.9	49
Tristan Nell	Men's 5 km	—				OTL	
Nico Esslinger	Men's 10 km	—				2:11:53.4	47

Women

Athlete	Event	Heats		Semi-final		Final	
Athlete	Event	Time	Rank	Time	Rank	Time	Rank
Madison Bergh	Women's 3 km knockout sprints	20:31.5	25	Did not advance			
Reza Westerduin	Women's 3 km knockout sprints	20:29.4	26	Did not advance			
Madison Bergh	Women's 5 km	—				1:16:56.2	68
Reza Westerduin	Women's 5 km	—				1:15:42.6	65

Mixed

Athlete	Event	Final	
Athlete	Event	Time	Rank
Madison Bergh; Nico Esslinger; Tristan Nell; Reza Westerduin	Team relay	1:22:07.5	21

== Swimming ==
Men

Athlete	Event	Heat		Semifinal		Final	
Athlete	Event	Time	Rank	Time	Rank	Time	Rank
Jose Canjulo	100 m freestyle	53.71	76	Did not advance			
Jose Canjulo	200 m individual medley	2:19.56	46	Did not advance			
Ronan Wantenaar	50 m breaststroke	26.85 NR	7 Q	26.94	10	Did not advance	
Ronan Wantenaar	100 m breaststroke	1:00.63	21	Did not advance			
