= Namibia at the 2024 World Aquatics Championships =

- Flag of Namibia
- World Aquatics code: NAM
- National federation: Namibia Swimming Federation
- Website: swimmingnamibia.com

in Doha, Qatar
- Competitors: 7 in 2 sports
- Medals: Gold 0 Silver 0 Bronze 0 Total 0

World Aquatics Championships appearances
- 1994; 1998; 2001; 2003; 2005; 2007; 2009; 2011; 2013; 2015; 2017; 2019; 2022; 2023; 2024; 2025

Namibia competed at the 2024 World Aquatics Championships in Doha, Qatar from 2 to 18 February.

== Competitors ==
The following is the list of competitors in the Championships.

Sport	Men	Women	Total
Open water swimming	2	2	4
Swimming	2	1	3
Total	4	3	7

== Open water swimming ==
Men

Athlete	Event	Time	Rank
Nico Esslinger	Men's 5 km	57:41.2	64
Phillip Seidler	Men's 10 km	1:54:04.2	48

Women

Athlete	Event	Time	Rank
Brynne Kinnaird	Women's 5 km	1:12:33.5	57
Carissa Steyn	Women's 5 km	OTL	58

== Swimming ==
Namibia entered 3 swimmers.

Men

Athlete	Event	Heat		Semifinal		Final	
Athlete	Event	Time	Rank	Time	Rank	Time	Rank
Oliver Durand	200 metre freestyle	1:54.22	49	Did not advance			
Oliver Durand	400 metre individual medley	4:42.64	22	—		Did not advance	
Ronan Wantenaar	50 metre breaststroke	27.81 NR	19	Did not advance			
Ronan Wantenaar	100 metre breaststroke	1:02.09	33	Did not advance			
Ronan Wantenaar	200 metre individual medley	2:05.16	31	Did not advance			

Women

Athlete	Event	Heat		Semifinal		Final	
Athlete	Event	Time	Rank	Time	Rank	Time	Rank
Jessica Humphrey	50 metre backstroke	30.43	40	Did not advance			
Jessica Humphrey	200 metre backstroke	2:26.07	30	Did not advance			
