= Namibia at the 2017 World Aquatics Championships =

- Flag of Namibia
- World Aquatics code: NAM
- National federation: Namibian Swimming Union
- Website: www.swimming-namibia.com

in Budapest, Hungary
- Competitors: 5 in 2 sports
- Medals: Gold 0 Silver 0 Bronze 0 Total 0

World Aquatics Championships appearances
- 1994; 1998; 2001; 2003; 2005; 2007; 2009; 2011; 2013; 2015; 2017; 2019; 2022; 2023; 2024; 2025

Namibia is scheduled to compete at the 2017 World Aquatics Championships in Budapest, Hungary from 14 July to 30 July.

== Open water swimming ==
Namibia has entered two open water swimmers

Athlete	Event	Time	Rank
Jorn Diekmann	Men's 5 km	OTL	
Phillip Seidler	Men's 5 km	56:32.7	42

== Swimming ==
Namibia has received a Universality invitation from FINA to send three swimmers (two men and one woman) to the World Championships.

Athlete	Event	Heat		Semifinal		Final	
Athlete	Event	Time	Rank	Time	Rank	Time	Rank
Xander Skinner	Men's 100 m freestyle	51.00	=56	did not advance			
Xander Skinner	Men's 200 m freestyle	1:54.99	60	did not advance			
Ronan Wantenaar	Men's 100 m backstroke	58.91	40	did not advance			
Ronan Wantenaar	Men's 50 m breaststroke	30.27	58	did not advance			
Kiah Borg	Women's 200 m breaststroke	2:48.48	33	did not advance			
