= Namibia at the 2023 World Aquatics Championships =

- Flag of Namibia
- FINA code: NAM
- National federation: Namibia Swimming Federation
- Website: swimmingnamibia.com

in Fukuoka, Japan
- Competitors: 2 in 1 sport
- Medals: Gold 0 Silver 0 Bronze 0 Total 0

World Aquatics Championships appearances
- 1994; 1998; 2001; 2003; 2005; 2007; 2009; 2011; 2013; 2015; 2017; 2019; 2022; 2023; 2024

Namibia is set to compete at the 2023 World Aquatics Championships in Fukuoka, Japan from 14 to 30 July.

== Swimming ==
Namibia entered 2 swimmers.

Men

Athlete	Event	Heat		Semifinal		Final	
Athlete	Event	Time	Rank	Time	Rank	Time	Rank
Xander Skinner	50 metre freestyle	22.78	49	Did not advance			
Xander Skinner	100 metre freestyle	50.00 NR	44	Did not advance			
Ronan Wantenaar	50 metre breaststroke	28.24	32	Did not advance			
Ronan Wantenaar	100 metre breaststroke	1:01.91	35	Did not advance			
Ronan Wantenaar	200 metre individual medley	2:05.97	36	Did not advance			
