= Leaders of Kavangoland =

Leaders of Kavangoland were the chief political figures who governed Kavangoland, a bantustan established under South African administration in what is now Namibia. The territory existed from 1972 until Namibian independence in 1990. Leadership titles changed over time, from Chief Councillor to Chief Minister and later Chairman of the Executive Committee, reflecting the territory's evolving administrative status under South African-imposed self-rule.

== Leaders ==
(Dates in italics indicate de facto continuation of office)

Tenure	Incumbent	Affiliation
Kavangoland
October 1972 to May 1973	Linus Shashipapo, Chief Councillor
Kavangoland (Self-Rule)
May 1973 to September 1977	Linus Shashipapo, Chief Minister
September 1977 to 1981	Alfons Majavero, Chief Minister
1981 to May 1989	Sebastiaan Kamwanga, Chairman of the Executive Committee	DTA

== Political affiliation ==
DTA - Democratic Turnhalle Alliance

== See also ==
- Bantustans in South West Africa
- Apartheid in Namibia
- Presidents of Namibia
- Prime Ministers of Namibia
