= Namibia at the 2015 World Aquatics Championships =

- Flag of Namibia
- World Aquatics code: NAM
- National federation: Namibian Swimming Union
- Website: www.swimming-namibia.com

in Kazan, Russia
- Competitors: 4 in 1 sport
- Medals: Gold 0 Silver 0 Bronze 0 Total 0

World Aquatics Championships appearances
- 1994; 1998; 2001; 2003; 2005; 2007; 2009; 2011; 2013; 2015; 2017; 2019; 2022; 2023; 2024; 2025

Namibia competed at the 2015 World Aquatics Championships in Kazan, Russia from 24 July to 9 August 2015.

== Swimming ==
Namibian swimmers have achieved qualifying standards in the following events (up to a maximum of 2 swimmers in each event at the A-standard entry time, and 1 at the B-standard):

Men

Athlete	Event	Heat		Semifinal		Final	
Athlete	Event	Time	Rank	Time	Rank	Time	Rank
Lushano Lamprecht	100 m backstroke	59.77	56	did not advance			
Lushano Lamprecht	200 m backstroke	2:08.14	35	did not advance			
Alexander Skinner	100 m freestyle	54.05	86	did not advance			
Alexander Skinner	200 m freestyle	2:01.01	75	did not advance			

Women

Athlete	Event	Heat		Semifinal		Final	
Athlete	Event	Time	Rank	Time	Rank	Time	Rank
Daniela Lindemeier	100 m breaststroke	1:12.07	47	did not advance			
Daniela Lindemeier	200 m breaststroke	2:35.17	39	did not advance			
Zanrè Oberholzer	100 m backstroke	1:04.09	45	did not advance			
Zanrè Oberholzer	200 m backstroke	2:08.14	35	did not advance			
