= Bagani, Namibia =

Bagani Tjwata
- Settlement
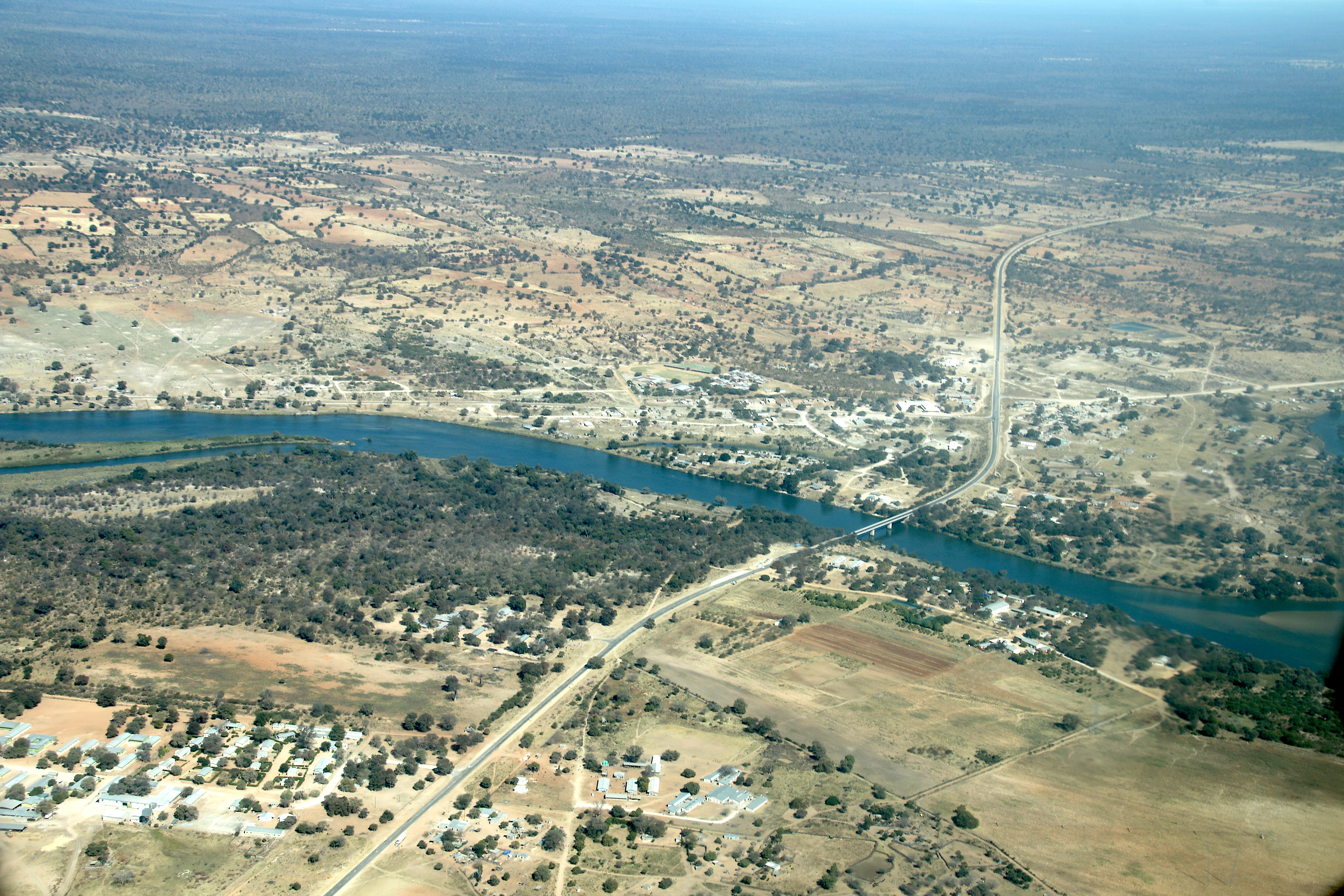
- Aerial view of Bagani with Okavango-Bridge

- Location in Namibia
- Coordinates: 18°7′S 21°37′E
- Country: Namibia
- Region: Kavango East
- Constituency: Mukwe Constituency
- Established: 1820

Government
  - King: Munika Mbambo (SWAPO)
- Elevation: 1,092 m (3,583 ft)

Population (2007)
  - Total: 2,000
- Time zone: UTC+2 (South African Standard Time)
- Area code: +66

Bagani (1.093 m above sea level) is a settlement on the south-western banks of the Okavango River in the Kavango East Region of Namibia, 200 kilometres (120 mi) east of Rundu and near the Popa Falls on the Okavango River. Bagani has a population of around 2.000 inhabitants and is homestead of the local Mbukushu kings.

== History ==
The history of Bagani (Mbukushu: "the old place") is closely linked with the history of the Mbukushu people, the easternmost of the five kingdoms of the Kavango people.

== Economy and infrastructure ==
Compared to many other villages in Namibia, Bagani is still underdeveloped. It suffered from bad infrastructure and the political unrest in the neighboring, country, Angola. Until recent years, the economy of Bagani was characterized by small farmers with only a few general services. Since the independence of Namibia in 1990 and particularly since an ongoing decentralisation policy, Bagani has gained some investments.

== Schools ==
- Bagani Combined School
