= C48 road (Namibia) =

Secondary route in Namibia

C48 road

Major junctions
- Northeast end: B8 Divundu
- Southwest end: A35 near Mohembo, Ngamiland West, Botswana

Location
- Country: Namibia
- Towns: Bagani

Highway system
- Transport in Namibia
← C47	→ C49

The C48, also the D3403, is a short secondary route in the Caprivi Strip of north-eastern Namibia. It connects Divundu via Bagani to the Botswanan-Namibian border at Mohembo and is 32 kilometres (20 mi) long. The Popa Falls can be reached via the C48.
