= Namibia at the 2019 World Aquatics Championships =

- Flag of Namibia
- FINA code: NAM
- National federation: Namibia Swimming Union
- Website: nasu.com.na

in Gwangju, South Korea
- Competitors: 3 in 2 sports
- Medals: Gold 0 Silver 0 Bronze 0 Total 0

World Aquatics Championships appearances
- 1994; 1998; 2001; 2003; 2005; 2007; 2009; 2011; 2013; 2015; 2017; 2019; 2022; 2023; 2024

Namibia competed at the 2019 World Aquatics Championships in Gwangju, South Korea from 12 to 28 July. This was the nation's thirteenth appearance at the FINA World Aquatics Championships since 1994. The Namibia Swimming Union sent three competitors, with Phillip Seidler competing in the open water swimming while Xander Skinner and Ronan Wantenaar competed in the pool.

== Open water swimming ==
Namibia qualified one male open water swimmer.

Athlete	Event	Time	Rank
Phillip Seidler	Men's 10 km	1:50:14.4	32

== Swimming ==
Men

Athlete	Event	Heat		Semifinal		Final	
Athlete	Event	Time	Rank	Time	Rank	Time	Rank
Xander Skinner	50 m freestyle	23.04	51	did not advance			
Xander Skinner	100 m freestyle	50.44	53	did not advance			
Ronan Wantenaar	100 m breaststroke	1:05.17	66	did not advance			
Ronan Wantenaar	200 m individual medley	2:09.02	43	did not advance			
