= List of Gciriku kings =

This is a list of Vahompa (Kings) of the Gciriku, one of the Kavango peoples of the north of Namibia, and in which village their Mbara (royal homestead) was located.

- Shimwemwe, lived at Ndonga-linena and Mpupa and was the king of the Gciriku tribe from 1785 to 1805.
- Kayengoma, ruled from 1805 to 1812 and his Mbara was at Ndonga-linena.
- Mulyata, ruled from 1812 to 1830 and he lived at Mayara.
- Nandundu, ruled from 1830 to 1832 and she also lived at Mayara.
- Muduva lived at Rutco, was a ruler from 1832 to 1860.
- Shirongo, king of the Gciriku tribe from 1860 to 1864.
- Muhera lived at Ngurungu, king of the Gciriku from 1865 to 1874.
- Nyangana ruled from 1874 to 1924. He lived at Shitopogho, Matumba, Kanyondo and Mamono.
- Haingura, 1925 to 1944 was a ruler and he lived at Mamono.
- Linus Mudumbi Shashipapo ruled from 1945 to 1984. He lived at Ndiyona.
- Sebastian Kamwanga, 1985 to 1999, had his royal seat at Mamono.
- Kassian Shiyambi, Gciriku King.died November 2019
- Aruvita Kayoka, Gciriku King. 27 June 2026 and current. Mamono
