= Nyangana =

- Settlement
- Location within Namibia
- Coordinates: 18°00′S 20°41′E
- Country: Namibia
- Region: Kavango East
- Time zone: UTC+2 (SAST)

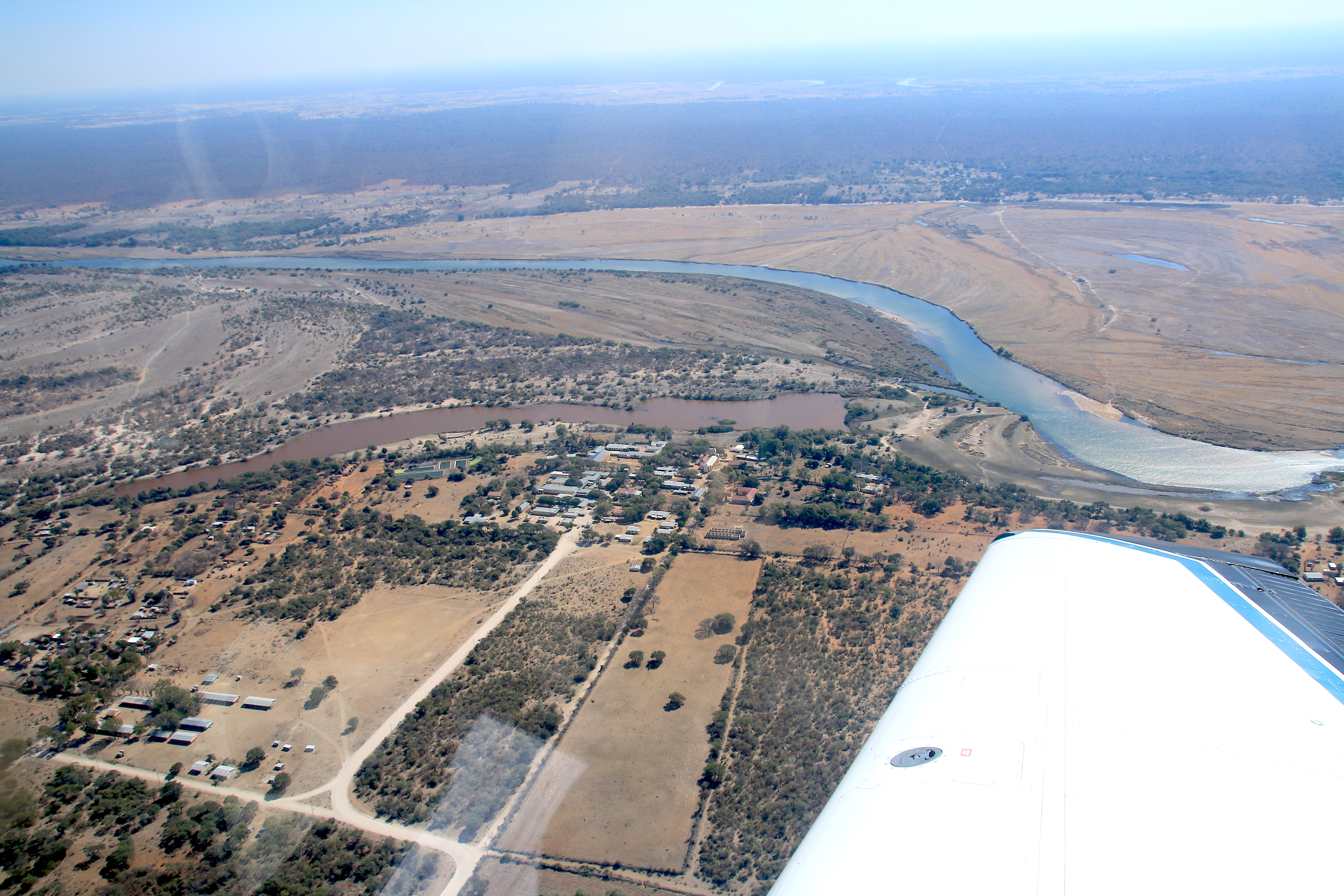
Nyangana from the air in 2019

Nyangana is a village in the Ndiyona Constituency in Kavango East Region of north-eastern Namibia, situated 100 kilometres (62 mi) east of Rundu. The Roman Catholic mission of Nyangana is located in the village.

== History ==
The settlement is named after Nyangana, king of the Gciriku tribe.

Catholic fathers of the organization Missionary Oblates of Mary Immaculate founded the Nyangana Mission in 1910, after they had been forced to leave the Andara Mission in 1908, as a result of a misfiring of a gun. King Libebe had turned hostile to the missionaries there.

Nyangana was founded as a mission station by father Joseph Gotthardt during the seventh Catholic mission expedition to Kavango. The previous six expeditions had not been successful. Nyangana became the bridgehead position for the Catholics in Kavango. Even Andara was founded soon, in 1913, by Gotthardt. Gotthardt later became the Archbishop of South West Africa.

== Nyangana today ==
Within the village, there are one Combined School and a private Roman Catholic hospital. The hospital was founded in 1936 by German sisters of the Order of Saint Benedict of Tutzing, this was then the only hospital for the whole Kavango Region.

The village features a hotel and a Youth Center. The vegetation type is thorn bush dominated by acacia trees.

== Notable people ==
- John Mutorwa, Namibian Minister of Agriculture, Water and Forestry since 2010
