= C49 =

C49 or C-49 may refer to:

- C49 road (Namibia)
- Caldwell 49, an H II region
- Douglas C-49, an American military transport aircraft
- Four Knights Game, a chess opening
