= Diyogha =

- Settlement
- Location within Namibia
- Coordinates: 18°05′S 21°28′E
- Country: Namibia
- Region: Kavango East
- Constituency: Mukwe Constituency
- Time zone: UTC+2 (SAST)

Diyogha is a settlement in the Kavango East Region in the north of Namibia. It is situated approximately 190 kilometres (120 mi) east of Rundu and belongs to the Mukwe Constituency. Diyogha is served by the Roman Catholic Holy Family Parish in Andara.
