= Vehicle registration plates of Namibia =

Republic of Namibia
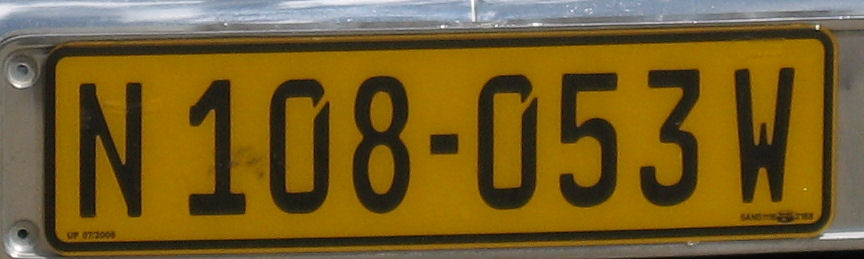
- Namibian regular legal standard number plate from Windhoek.
- Country: Namibia
- Country code: NAM

Current series
- Size: 520 mm × 110 mm 20.5 in × 4.3 in
- Serial format: N 123-456 A(B) (A[B] being the regional code)
- Colour (front): Black on yellow (for standard private plates)
- Colour (rear): Black on yellow (for standard private plates)

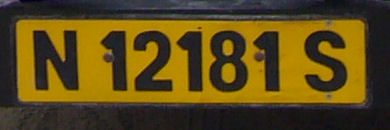
Namibian plate from Swakopmund

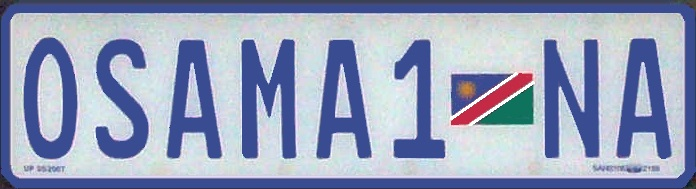
personalised plate

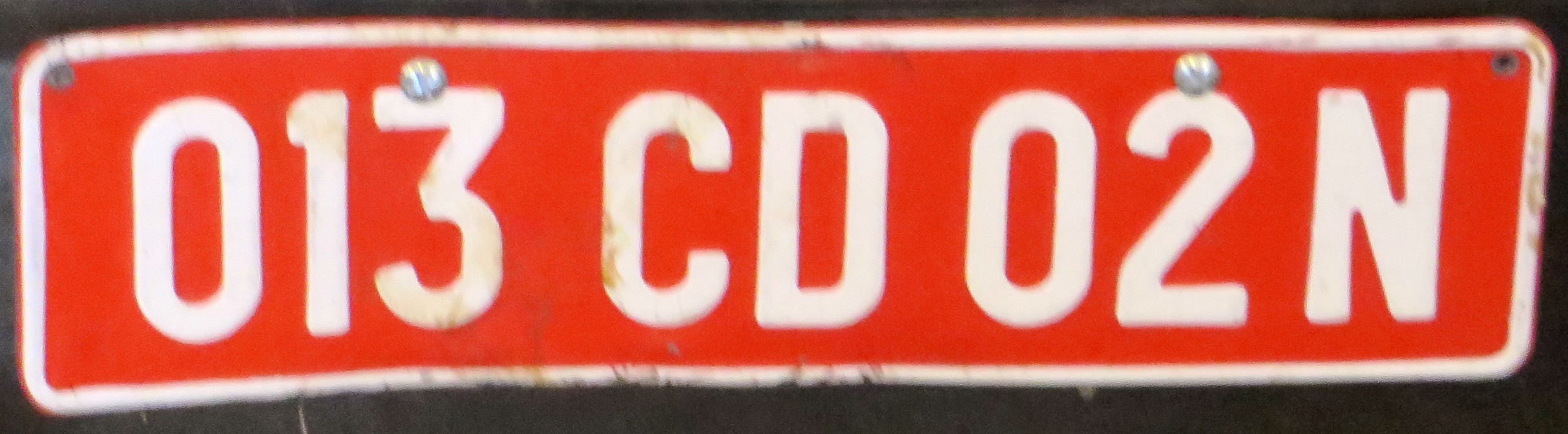
diplomatic plate

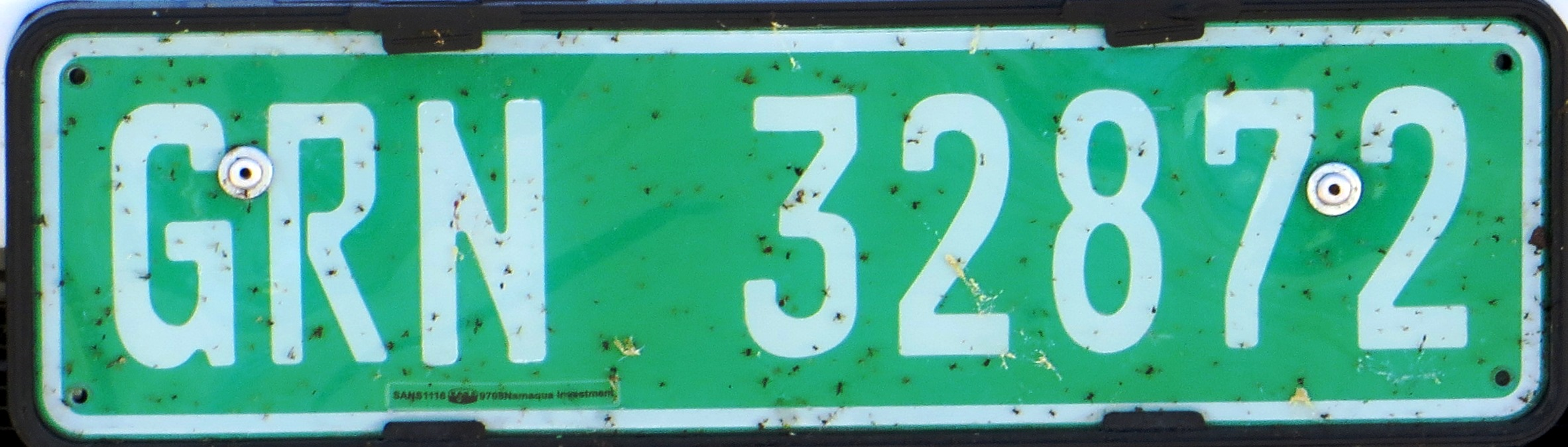
government plate

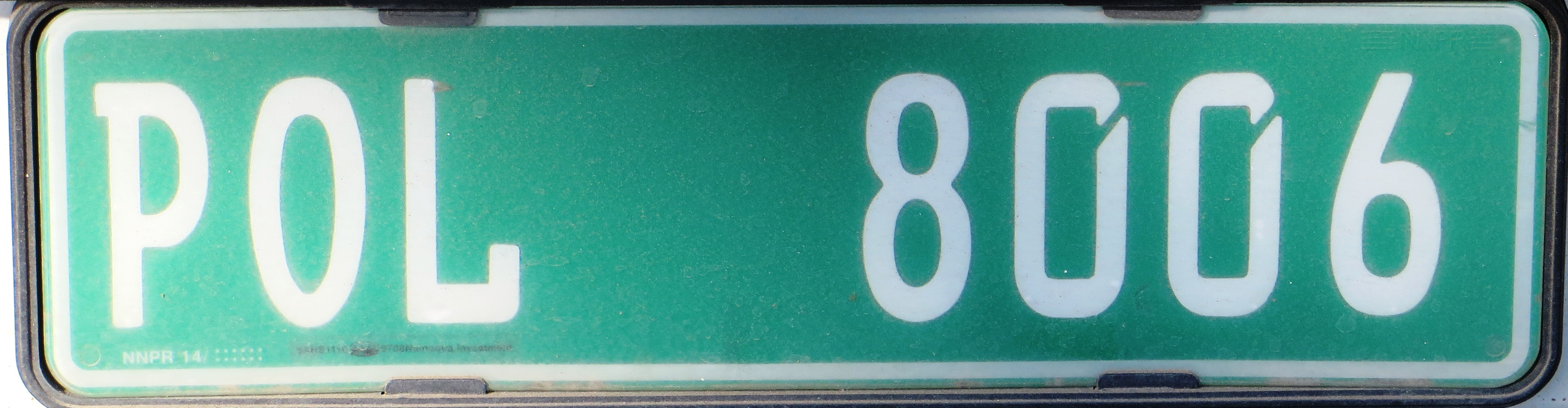
police plate

Vehicle registration plates of Namibia are yellow fluorescent metal plates with imprints in black. The standard version is uniform throughout the country, and carries one of the following forms:

N 1 A	N 1 AB
N 12 A	N 12 AB
N 123 A	N 123 AB
N 1234 A	N 1234 AB
N 12345 A	N 12345 AB
N 123-456 A	N 123-456 AB

The first letter is always "N" for Namibia. The last one or two letters indicate the town or region the car originates from. In between, numbers are issued sequentially within each region, starting with single-digit numbers, and increasing in length as required. The vast majority of vehicles are registered in the capital, Windhoek, and require six digits; most other regions currently use three or four digits.

Since 2007, personalised number plates are available at an extra fee. Such plates may carry up to seven alphanumerical characters, followed by the Namibian Flag and the letters NA. They also differ in color and material, the personalised plates are made from acrylic white plastic and have light blue characters.

Government vehicles use dark green number plates with white imprints. As with ordinary number plates, numbers are issued sequentially within each region, starting with single-digit numbers, and increasing in length as required. The Government vehicle plates are prefixed with the following letters:

- NAM1 - Sam Nujoma vehicles
- NAM2 - Hifikepunye Pohamba vehicles
- NAM3 - Hage Geingob vehicles
- Presidential Seal - The President of Namibia vehicle
- GRN - Government vehicles
- JUD -Judiciary of Namibia
- NDF - Namibia Defence Force
- POL - Police
- NCS - Namibian Correctional Service
- LNA - Legislature National Assembly (since 2024)
- LNC - Legislature National Council (since 2024)

== Town codes ==
The following list may be incomplete.

- A - Arandis (since 2019)
- AR – Aranos
- B – Bethanien
- BK - Bukalo
- DV - Divundu (since 2019)
- EN – Eenhana
- G – Grootfontein
- GO – Gobabis
- HB - Henties Bay (since 2019)
- HN - Helao Nafidi (since 2022)
- K – Keetmanshoop
- KA – Karasburg
- KH – Khorixas
- KM – Katima Mulilo
- KR – Karibib
- KO - Okongo (since 2019)
- L – Lüderitz
- M – Mariental
- MA – Maltahöhe
- MT – Omuthiya (since 2019)
- ND – Ondangwa
- NK - Nkurenkuru
- OA - Okahao (since 2022)
- OH – Okahandja
- OJ – Outjo
- OK – Okakarara
- OM – Omaruru
- ON – Otjinene
- OP – Opuwo
- OR – Oranjemund
- OT – Otjiwarongo
- OV – Otavi
- R – Rehoboth
- RC – Ruacana
- RU – Rundu
- S – Swakopmund
- SH – Oshakati
- T – Tsumeb
- TK- Tsumkwe
- U – Usakos
- UP – Outapi
- W – Windhoek Capital of Namibia.
- WB – Walvis Bay

== South West Africa ==
From 1968 to 1990, South West Africa used a system similar to that in use in South Africa, using the prefix S:

- SA – Karasburg Now KA.
- SB – Bethanie Now B.
- SBA – Ovamboland
- SC – Oranjemund Now OR.
- SCA – Okavango
- SDA – Kaokoveld
- SE – Otavi Now OV.
- SEA – Otjinene Now ON.
- SEB – Okakarara Now OK.
- SF – Grootfontein Now G.
- SFA – Damaraland
- SH – Okahandja Now OH.
- SJ – Outjo Now OJ.
- SK – Keetmanshoop Now K.
- SL – Lüderitz now L.
- SM – Maltahöhe now MA.
- SN – Mariental now M.
- SO – Otjiwarongo now OT.
- SP – Karibib now KR.
- SR – Rehoboth Now R.
- SS – Swakopmund now S.
- ST – Tsumeb now T.
- SU – Usakos now U.
- SV – Walvis Bay now WB.
- SW – Windhoek now W.
- SX – Gobabis now GO.
- SY – Omaruru now OM.
- ECZ– Caprivi Strip. The Zambezi Region now uses the code KM (Katima Mulilo).
- Walvis Bay, although legally part of the Cape Province, was long administered as part of South West Africa. During the 1980s it was returned to the Cape Province and used the code CWB. It then became part of Namibia.
- Until 1968 South West Africa used a system of one- and two-letter codes without prefixes. W stood for Windhoek, L for Lüderitz, R for Rehoboth, Sd for Swakopmund, T for Tsumeb and Wb for Walvis Bay.
- The South African Defence Force also operated in South West Africa and used the same codes (U until 1961, and then R) as in South Africa.
- South Africa's Bantu Trust also operated in South West Africa, its vehicles using the code BT, as in South Africa.
