= Mahango Game Park =

Protected area in Namibia, part of Bwabwata National Park

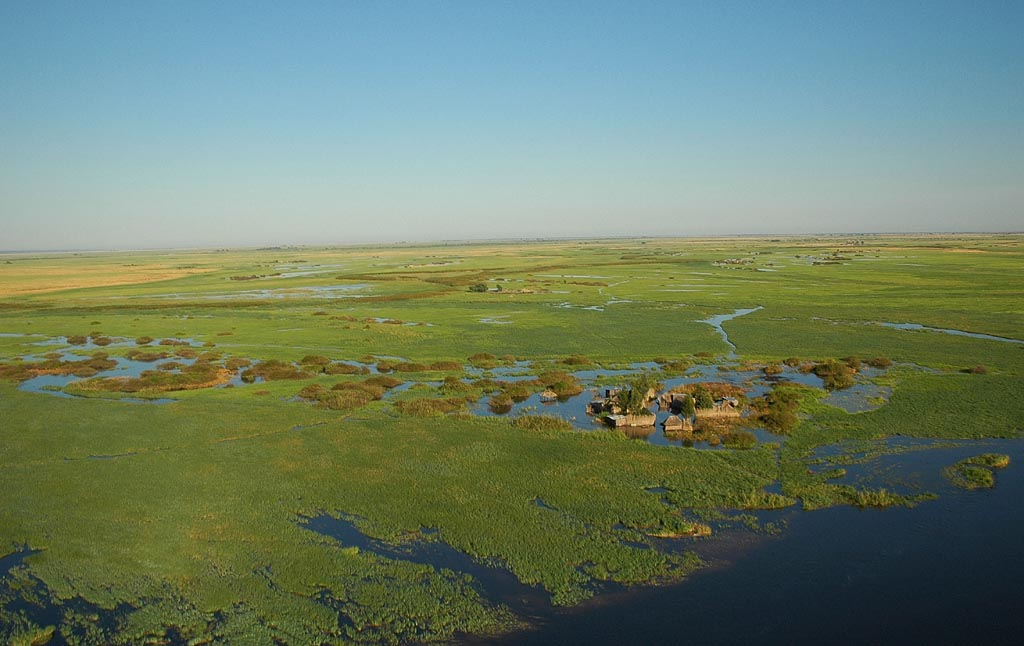
- Mahango Game Park within the Caprivi flood plain

- Location within Namibia
- Location: Namibia
- Coordinates: 18°12.664′S 21°41.396′E
- Area: 24,462 hectares (60,450 acres)
- Established: 1986
- Governing body: Ministry of Environment and Tourism, Namibia

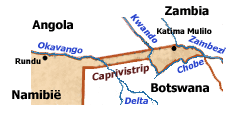
Caprivi Strip.

The Mahango Game Park (also known as the Mahango Game Reserve) is a protected area in Namibia within Bwabwata National Park. It is situated at the country's eastern border with Botswana in the flood plains of the Okavango River basin, close to the Popa Falls on the river. The Caprivi Strip encloses the western part of the park. It was established in 1986 and covers an area of 24,462 hectares (60,450 acres). With over 300 species of birds, it has been designated an Important Bird Area by BirdLife International. About two thirds of the bird species found in Namibia are located here as it includes both wetland and tropical terrestrial species of birds.

== Geography ==
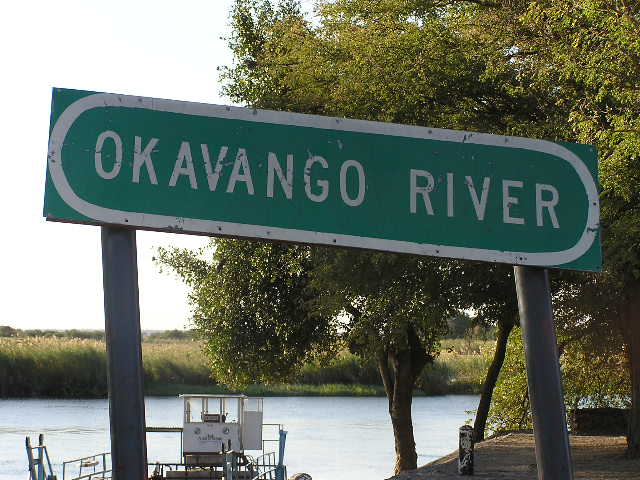
Okavango River through the park

The park is located on the western end of the Caprivi Strip and forms part of the large flood plains of the Okavango River basin in north-eastern Namibia between Andara, a Roman Catholic Mission, and the border to Botswana. Topography of the park is in the elevation range of 500 - 1,000m. The Okavango Swamps starts from this park area and is known as the panhandle region. The Okavango River flows into Botswana forming the Okavango Delta in that country.

The park is subject to a dry season lasting from April to November. The rainy season lasts from mid-November to April. The annual rainfall incidence varies between 550 and 600 mm and 80% of it occurs during the rainy season. The monthly average maximum temperature is reported as 30 °C.

== Flora ==
Vegetation consists of 38% shrubland and 62% grassland. Riparian forests are an important form of dense vegetation against the dry woodlands in the higher reaches of the river valley and reed beds, swamps, and open flooded grasslands of the flood plains. In view of this varying vegetational pattern, the park is rich in flora; with a reported 869 species from 88 families. The important riparian woodland species are Garcinia, Sclerocarya, Diospyros, Acacia and Grewia. The species reported from the desert areas are Pterocarpus, Ricinodendron, Ziziphus, Baikiaea and shrubs of Baphia. The flood plains have Phoenix and baobab (Adansonia); the baobab trees in the park are very large. One of the more commonly found trees in the park is the baobab.

== Fauna ==
A very rich diversity of mammal species can be found here; 99 species are reported, including elephants, lions, leopards, cheetahs, and hippopotami. Some of the key species which are under the threatened list are Lycaon pictus pictus (EN), Loxodonta africana (VU), Kobus leche, and Lutra maculicollis (VU) found mostly in aquatic environment; Loxodonta africana and Kobus leche also migrate to neighboring countries. There are 71 aqua faunal species and five species of amphibians such as Phrynomantis affinis.

=== Avifauna ===
The avifaunal species consists of wetland birds such as Egretta vinaceigula, Bugeranus carunculatus, Ardeola rufiventris, Pelecanus rufescens, Ephippiorhynchus senegalensis, Microparra capensis, Vanellus albiceps, Vanellus crassirostris, Glareola pratincola, Macronyx ameliae and Circus pygargus. In the riverine habitat, the bird species of importance are Glareola nuchalis and Rynchops flavirostris, and in the fringing riparian vegetation Scotopelia peli and Gorsachius leuconotus species have been recorded.
