= Namibia at the 2013 World Aquatics Championships =

- Flag of Namibia
- World Aquatics code: NAM
- National federation: Namibian Swimming Union
- Website: www.swimming-namibia.com

in Barcelona, Spain
- Competitors: 2 in 1 sports
- Medals: Gold 0 Silver 0 Bronze 0 Total 0

World Aquatics Championships appearances
- 1994; 1998; 2001; 2003; 2005; 2007; 2009; 2011; 2013; 2015; 2017; 2019; 2022; 2023; 2024; 2025

Namibia competed at the 2013 World Aquatics Championships in Barcelona, Spain between 19 July and 4 August 2013.

== Swimming ==
Namibian swimmers earned qualifying standards in the following events (up to a maximum of 2 swimmers in each event at the A-standard entry time, and 1 at the B-standard):

Women

Athlete	Event	Heat		Semifinal		Final	
Athlete	Event	Time	Rank	Time	Rank	Time	Rank
Daniela Lindemaier	100 m breaststroke	1:12.06	44	did not advance			
Daniela Lindemaier	200 m breaststroke	2:37.47	33	did not advance			
Zanrè Oberholzer	100 m backstroke	1:03.36	34	did not advance			
Zanrè Oberholzer	200 m backstroke	2:14.52	27	did not advance			
