= Kangongo =

- Settlement
- Nickname: Kango
- Motto(s): "Peace, Harmony and Solidarity"
- Location in Namibia
- Coordinates: 17°59′08″S 21°09′13″E
- Country: Namibia
- Region: Kavango East
- Constituency: Mukwe Constituency
- Established: 1700s

Government
  - Headman: Erwin Disho
- Elevation: 1,046 m (3,432 ft)

Population (2021)
  - Total: 5,000
- Time zone: UTC+2 (South African Standard Time)
- Postal code: 9000
- Area code: (+264) 66

Kangongo (1.093 m above sea level) is a settlement on the Eastern banks of the Kavango River in the Kavango East Region, Namibia, 156 km east of Rundu along the Trans-Caprivi Highway. Kangongo has a population of about 5000 inhabitants.

Kangongo is the main village and surrounded by various hamlets such as Shadithiki to the northeast, Tjwatama and Shandhimbo to the southeast, Ndarata in the centre, Shakashondo to the west and Sharukuya to the northwest, Teya in the south centre, and Sharuhenga in the far south.

== History ==
The history of Kangongo is closely linked with the history of the Hambukushu people, the easternmost of the five kingdoms of the Kavango people.

The first primary school was established by the Roman Catholic missionaries and the historic building still stands where the school was housed. Kangongo also had a station for contract workers in South African mines. These workers were recruited from various villages and came to South Africa via Botswana from Kangongo.

== Economy ==
The economy of Kangongo is characterized by subsistence farming, with little general services i.e. school, a small clinic and three shops.

A stone crusher is a primary source of employment opportunities in the village. The crusher is currently owned by CrushCo Namibia (Pty) Ltd. Kangongo also has a fish farm run by a cooperative comprises members drawn from the Kangongo community. At present the fish farm needs re-investment in terms of infrastructure and capital for it to operate optimally.

== Schools ==
- Kangongo Secondary School was once a primary school introduced by the missionaries and later became a secondary school. The school teaches grades 0 to 11 and also enrolls students from surrounding villages.

== Health: Hospitals/ Clinics ==
- Kangongo Clinic

== Sports and Recreation ==
The village's main sports club is called Kango Western Tops. It has both football and netball sides.

- Academies and Feeder Clubs within Kangongo

The Kangongo Academies and Sub-Teams are:

1. New Action SC (Tjwatama, Kangongo)
2. Juventus SC (Ndarata, Kangongo)
3. Kango Chiefs SC (Shakashondo, Kangongo)
4. Makore Cosmos SC (Teya, Kangongo)
5. Blue Waters SC (Rukuro, Kangongo)
6. Kango Legends SC (Legends, Kangongo)
7. Kakiha Football Academy (Kakiha, Mbapuka, Kangongo)
8. Kaminamina United (Sharukuya, Kangongo)

== Twin Villages – Sister Towns ==
Kangongo is twinned with:

- Divundu, Namibia
- Nieuwegein, Netherlands
- Gudhjem, Denmark
