= Raphael Dinyando =

Namibian politician and diplomat (1960–2013)

The Honourable Raphael Dinyando MP
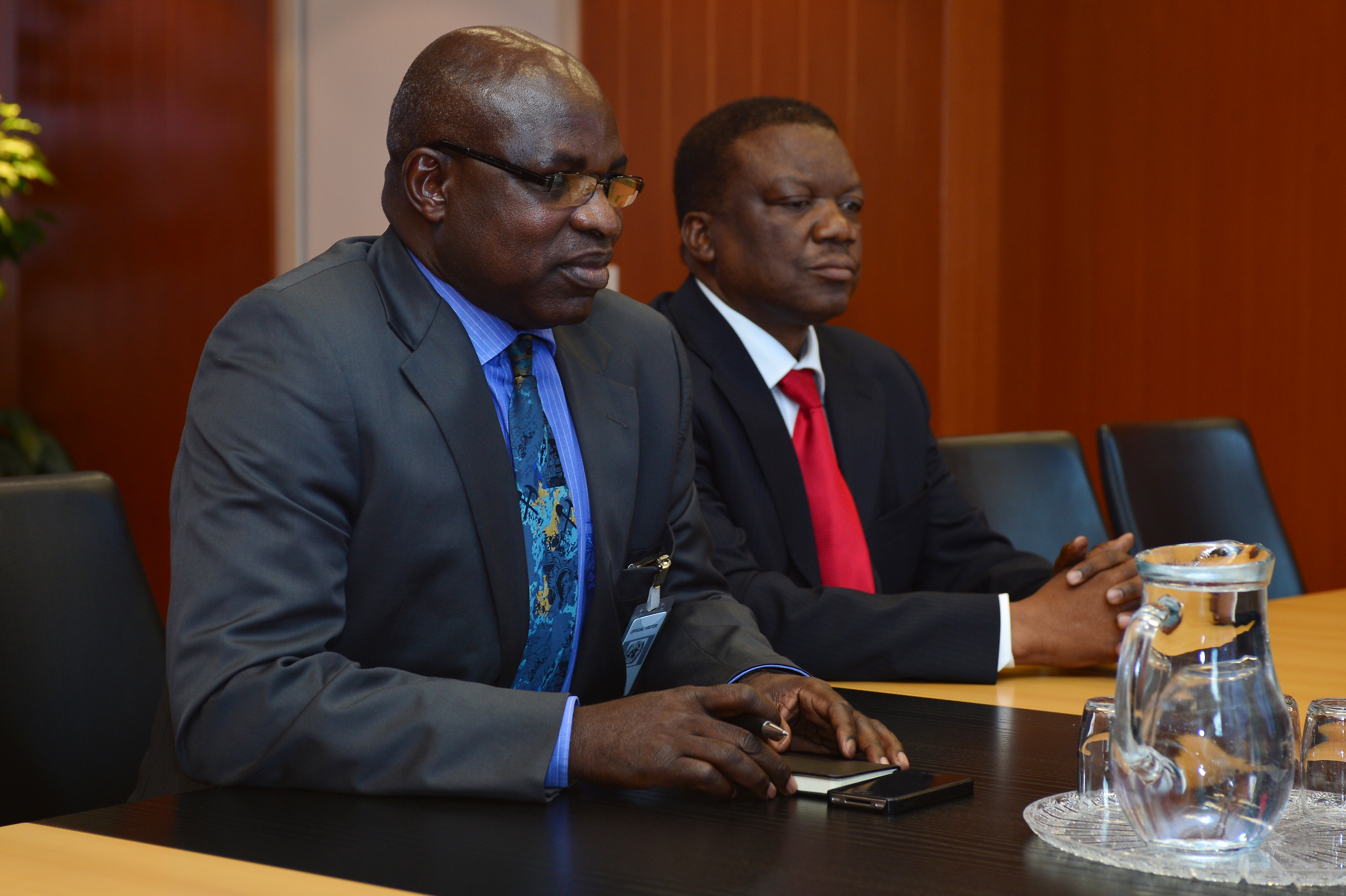
- Isak Katali & Raphael Dinyando (right) in May 2013

Ambassador to Austria
- In office 21 March 2010 – 4 September 2013

Deputy Minister of Information and Broadcasting
- In office 21 March 2005 – 21 March 2010

Personal details
- Born: 2 August 1960 Divundu, Kavango East
- Died: 4 September 2013 (aged 53) Vienna, Austria
- Party: SWAPO
- Children: 4
- Education: University of Zululand
- Occupation: Politician
- Profession: Administrator

Raphael Nakare Dinyando (2 August 1960 – 4 September 2013) was a Namibian politician and diplomat.

Born in Divundu in 1960, Dinyando attended Rundu Secondary School in Rundu in northern Namibia. He studied at the University of Zululand in South Africa from 1982 to 1985 and graduated with a Diploma in Local Government and Administration. He was a SWAPO activist since 1986.

He served as the first mayor of Rundu from 1993 to 1998, and then until 2000 as vice-chairperson of the Town Council. He became Member of Parliament on a SWAPO ticket on 21 March 2000. During his second term in Parliament from 2005 to 2010 he served as Deputy Minister of Information and Broadcasting. In 2010 he was appointed Namibian ambassador to Austria.

Dinyando was married with four children. He died of cancer at 53 years of age in Vienna.
