= Mbunza =

Traditional kingdom in Southern Africa

Mbunza is a traditional Kavango kingdom in what is today Namibia. Its people speak the Kwangali language.
