= Namibia at the 2011 World Aquatics Championships =

- Flag of Namibia
- FINA code: NAM
- National federation: Namibian Swimming Union
- Website: www.swimming-namibia.com

in Shanghai, China
- Competitors: 3 in 1 sport
- Medals: Gold 0 Silver 0 Bronze 0 Total 0

World Aquatics Championships appearances
- 1994; 1998; 2001; 2003; 2005; 2007; 2009; 2011; 2013; 2015; 2017; 2019; 2022; 2023; 2024

Namibia competed at the 2011 World Aquatics Championships in Shanghai, China between July 16 and 31, 2011.

== Swimming ==
Namibia qualified 3 swimmers.

Men

Athlete	Event	Heats		Semifinals		Final	
Athlete	Event	Time	Rank	Time	Rank	Time	Rank
Quinton Delie	Men's 100m Freestyle	52.74	59	did not advance			
Quinton Delie	Men's 200m Freestyle	1:57.47	52	did not advance			

Women

Athlete	Event	Heats		Semifinals		Final	
Athlete	Event	Time	Rank	Time	Rank	Time	Rank
Christine Briedenhann	Women's 50m Freestyle	27.46	44	did not advance			
Christine Briedenhann	Women's 100m Freestyle	59.55	51	did not advance			
Daniela Lindemeier	Women's 100m Breaststroke	1:15.64	39	did not advance			
Daniela Lindemeier	Women's 200m Breaststroke	2:47.56	37	did not advance			
