= Joseph Gotthardt =

Namibian Bishop

Joseph Gotthardt (16 December 1880 – 3 August 1963) was a Catholic missionary and later Bishop and Archbishop in South-West Africa (today Namibia). He was the first to set up missions in the Kavango Region and in Ovamboland, became the first Vicar Apostolic of Windhoek.

== Early life and missionary work ==
Gotthardt was born in Thalheim in the German Westerwald. He attended the Oblate Congregation in the Limburg Province in the Netherlands from 1900 to 1905 and graduated as priest. He worked as Junior Lecturer directly after being ordained until 1907 and was then sent to Grootfontein in German South-West Africa.

Soon after his arrival he in Namibia he led the sixth and seventh mission journeys to the Kavango region—a difficult assignment considering that the leader of the indigenous population, Hompa (King) Nyangana of the VaGciriku was a fierce critic of all European influence, and particularly that of missionaries. The previous five mission journeys into the Kavango had been unsuccessful but the seventh led to the establishment of a mission station at Nyangana in 1910 and at Andara in 1913.

Gotthardt also developed the first mission station in former Ovamboland, at Oshikuku, in 1924.

== Church career ==
Gotthardt was appointed Prefect Apostolic of Cimbebasia in 1921, replacing the retired Eugenio Klaeyle. When the prefecture became the Windhoek Vicariate soon thereafter, he became Vicar and was ordained as bishop at Hünfeld in Germany in 1924, becoming the leader of the Catholic Church in South-West Africa.

In 1923, he published a widely received paper The awakening of Africa and the duties of the Catholic church in which he portrayed the "unhappy entanglement" of colonisation and mission, one of the first pieces of criticism of colonisation in Namibia.

After serving 25 years in the position of Vicar, Pope Pius XII appointed him as archbishop in 1951. After more than 50 years of service, Gotthardt resigned at the age of 80 in May 1961. He died in Swakopmund on 3 August 1963.
