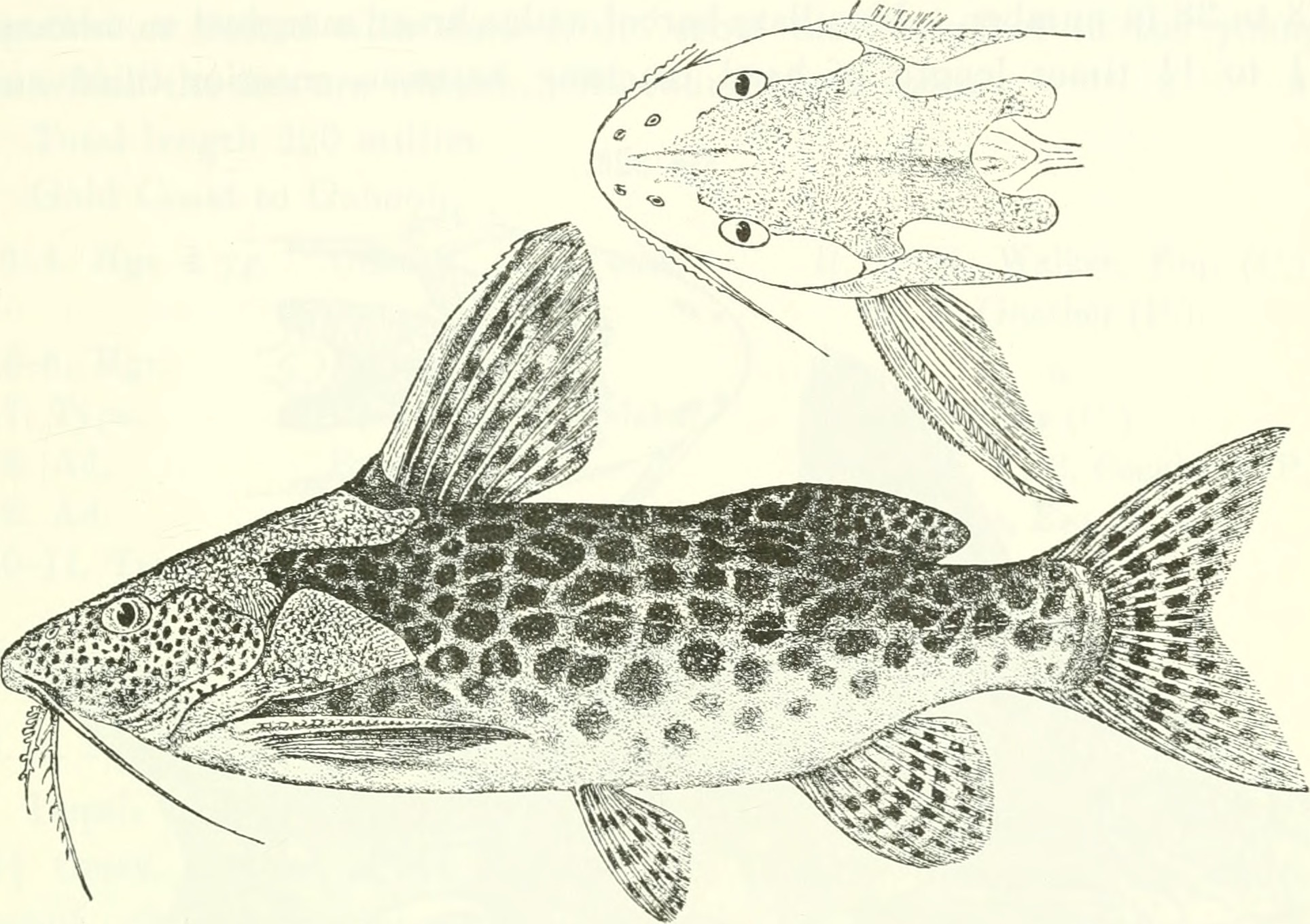

Conservation status
- Least Concern (IUCN 3.1)

Scientific classification
- Kingdom: Animalia
- Phylum: Chordata
- Class: Actinopterygii
- Order: Siluriformes
- Family: Mochokidae
- Genus: Synodontis
- Species: S. macrostigma

Binomial name
- Synodontis macrostigma Boulenger, 1911

= Synodontis macrostigma =

Species of fish

Synodontis macrostigma, known as the largespot squeaker, is a species of upside-down catfish that is native to Angola, Botswana, Namibia, South Africa and Zambia where it is found in the Cunene, Okavango, upper Zambezi and Kafue River systems. It was first described by British-Belgian zoologist George Albert Boulenger in 1911, from specimens collected in the Okovango River, Botswana, by R. B. Woosnam. The species name macrostigma is derived from the Greek word makros, meaning "large", and the Greek word stigma, meaning "mark" or "spot" and refers to the large spots on the sides of the fish.

== Description ==
Like all members of the genus Synodontis, S. macrostigma has a strong, bony head capsule that extends back as far as the first spine of the dorsal fin. The head contains a distinct narrow, bony, external protrusion called a humeral process. The shape and size of the humeral process helps to identify the species. In S. macrostigma, the humeral process is a little longer than it is broad, triangular in shape, rough, and without a ridge on the lower edge.

The fish has three pairs of barbels. The maxillary barbels are on located on the upper jaw, and two pairs of mandibular barbels are on the lower jaw. The maxillary barbel is long and straight without any branches, with a broad membrane at the base. It extends to a length of about 4/5 times the length of the head. The outer pair of mandibular barbels is a little under twice the length of the inner pair, and both pairs have short branches.

The front edges of the dorsal fins and the pectoral fins of Syntontis species are hardened into stiff spines. In S. macrostigma, the spine of the dorsal fin is about as long as the head, slightly curved, smooth in the front and serrated on the back. The remaining portion of the dorsal fin is made up of seven branching rays. The spine of the pectoral fin is shorter than the size of the dorsal spine, and serrated on both sides. The adipose fin is 4 to 4 1/2 times as long as it is deep. The anal fin contains four unbranched and eight branched rays. The tail, or caudal fin, is deeply forked.

All members of Syndontis have a structure called a premaxillary toothpad, which is located on the very front of the upper jaw of the mouth. This structure contains several rows of short, chisel-shaped teeth. In S. macrostigma, the toothpad forms a short and broad band. On the lower jaw, or mandible, the teeth of Syndontis are attached to flexible, stalk-like structures and described as "s-shaped" or "hooked". The number of teeth on the mandible is used to differentiate between species; in S. macrostigma, there are about 20 to 26 teeth on the mandible.

The base body color is brown on the top surface, becoming lighter toward the underside. The back and sides have large round or oval blackish spots, smaller spots appear on the head and fins.

The maximum total length of the species is 17.1 centimetres (6.7 in). Generally, females in the genus Synodontis tend to be slightly larger than males of the same age.

== Habitat and behavior ==
In the wild, the species has been found in the upper Zambezi River basin, and the Okavango River system. The reproductive habits of most of the species of Synodontis are not known, beyond some instances of obtaining egg counts from gravid females. Spawning likely occurs during the flooding season between July and October, and pairs swim in unison during spawning. As a whole, species of Synodontis are omnivores, consuming insect larvae, algae, gastropods, bivalves, sponges, crustaceans, and the eggs of other fishes. The growth rate is rapid in the first year, then slows down as the fish age.
