= Henties Bay =

City in Erongo Region, Namibia

Henties Bay Afrikaans: Hentiesbaai German: Hentiesbucht
- City
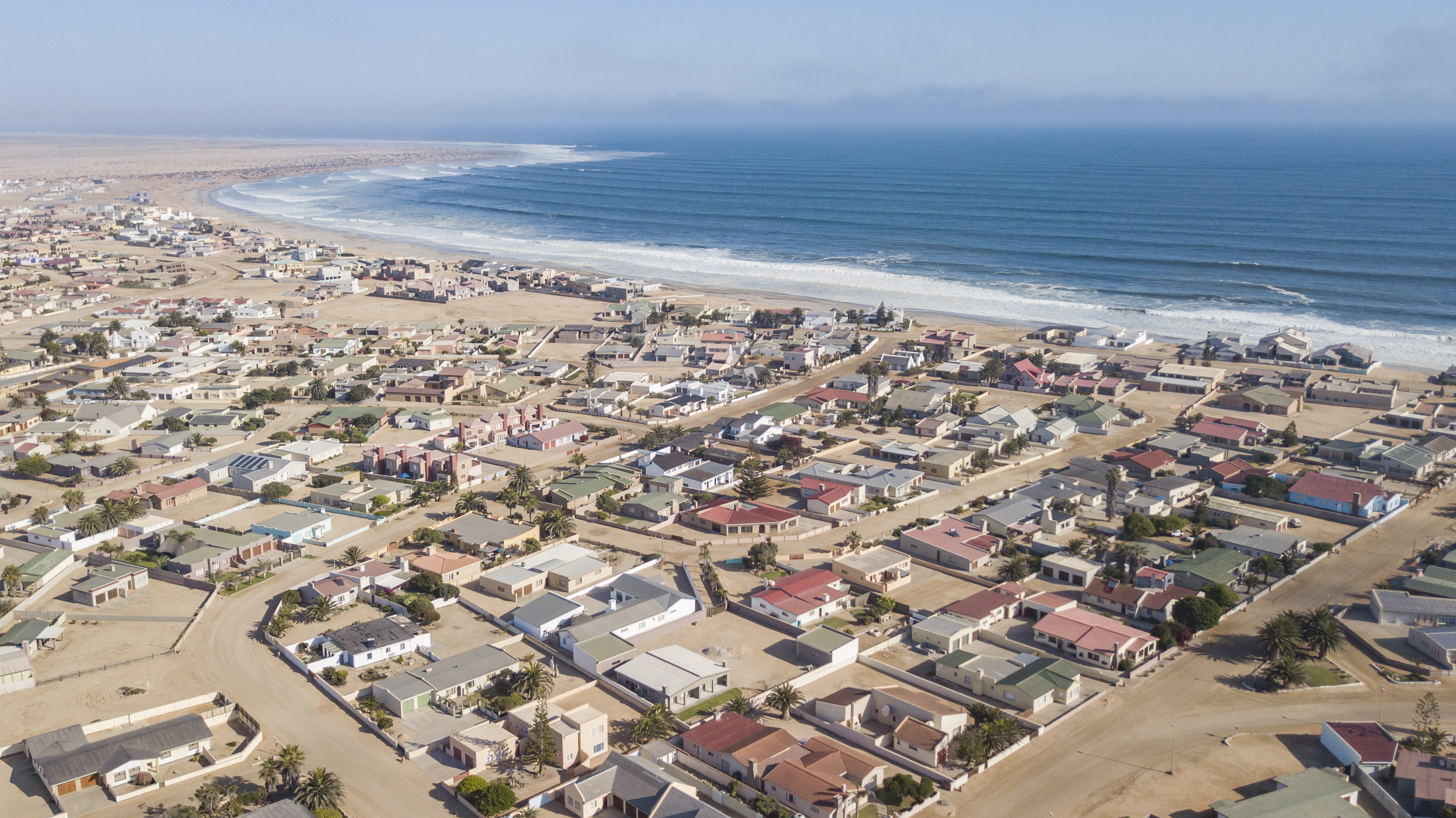
- Henties Bay (2018)

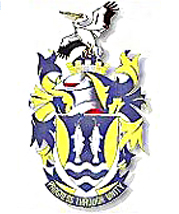
- Seal

- Location within Namibia Location within Africa
- Coordinates: 22.1184°S 14.2824°E
- Country: Namibia
- Region: Erongo Region
- Constituency: Arandis Constituency
- Established: 1929

Government
  - Mayor: Titus Johannes

Population (2023)
  - Total: 7,569
- Time zone: UTC+2 (South African Standard Time)
- Number plate: HB
- Climate: BWk
- Website: hentiesbaytourism.com

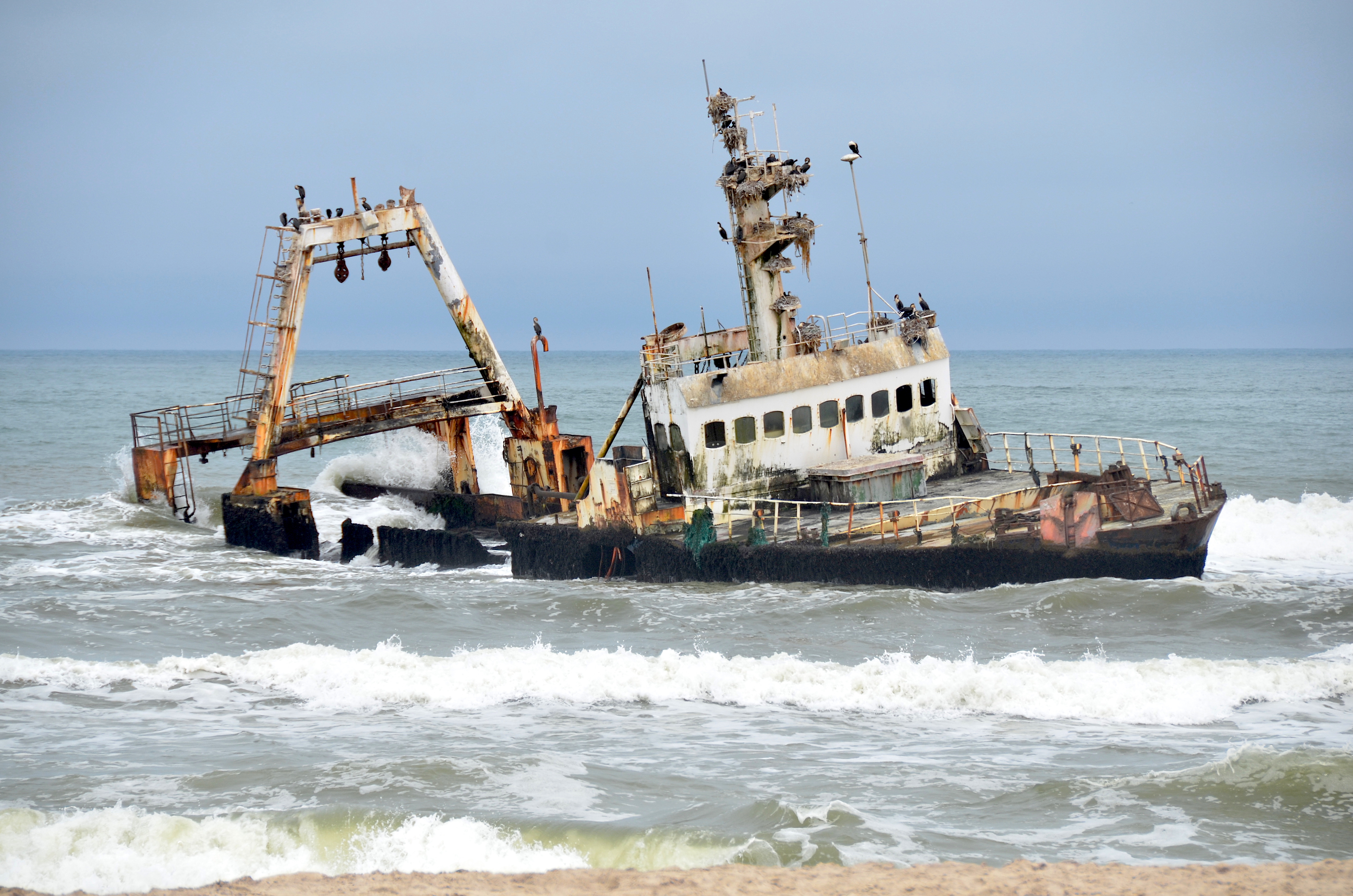
Shipwreck Zeila 14 km south of Henties Bay (2014) 22°14′28″S 014°21′13″E

Henties Bay (English, literally: Henty's Bay. Afrikaans: Hentiesbaai, German: Hentiesbucht) is a coastal city in the Erongo Region of western Namibia. The town had 7,569 inhabitants in 2023, an increase from 3,285 in 2001.

Established as a holiday spot in the first half of the 20th century it is a popular tourist destination for anglers and 4x4 enthusiasts.

== Geography ==
Henties Bay is located 72 kilometres (45 miles) north of Swakopmund.

Historical population
Year	Pop.	±% p.a.
2001	3,285	—
2011	4,720	+3.69%
2023	7,569	+4.01%

== History ==
Bartolomeu Dias sailed along the Atlantic coast in 1488. Near the area of today's Henties Bay he discovered such an abundance of fish that he named this coastline Praia das Sardinhas, Coast of Fish. The fresh water source was first discovered by Schutztruppe soldiers in 1886. In 1920, a minerals prospector stayed overnight. After tasting the water, he was said to be healed from an affliction.

The namesake of the town is major Hendrik "Henty" Stefanus van der Merwe who arrived in the area in 1929 while searching for water. He had been hunting a rhinoceros in the arid hinterland of the Namibian coast near the Brandberg in order to collect a reward from a museum in Pennsylvania that was in search of a rhino skeleton. After shooting the rhino and scraping meat from the bones, water resources of the expedition diminished, forcing the party to load the decomposing carcass and search for water.

They chose to head into the direction of the Atlantic coast and reached it close to Cape Cross. From there van der Merwe and his fellows searched southwards for the mouth of the Omaruru River. A few miles south of the river mouth they discovered a deep sand valley with reed grass growing in it, advertising the presence of fresh water. Van der Merwe liked the place and after delivering the bones and collecting his reward, returned the following Christmas to build a wooden hut in the riverbed. The place became known as Henty se baai (Henty's Bay) and developed into a holiday hideout, mainly because of the abundance of fish at this spot. Stefanus was one of the first to promote the town as a tourist resort.

In 1951 the South–West Africa Administration mandated to South Africa, proclaimed erven in the Omaruru riverbed that were available for rent, but the erection of permanent structures was not allowed. The first shop was established during that time. A lighthouse was erected to guide ships along the dangerous Namibian coast. In the 1960s mining holes were dug after diamonds had been found in the area on a few occasions. A few years later mining was abandoned due to lack of success. In 1966 it was decided that the riverbed must not be settled in, and property north and south of it was sold. A hotel was built one year later, and the town began to develop.

== Economy and infrastructure ==
Areva, a French company that built the first desalination plant in Southern Africa at Wlotzkasbaken, 30 kilometres (19 mi) north of Swakopmund, has proposed constructing a desalination facility north of Henties Bay. Plans also include an environmentally sustainable facility for the production of Jatropha, a source of bio-fuel which is adapted to arid environments. According to designers, the desalination plant would have capacity to supply water to the nearby towns of Uis, Okombahe and Henties Bay.

In July 2017, the University of Namibia (UNAM) revealed plans to establish a marine engineering and mining training facility at the coast. An eight-hectare piece of land had been donated by the town's municipality for the development of the School of Marine Engineering and Maritime Studies. In October 2020 UNAM inaugurated a desalination drinking water bottling plant, an extension of the institution's development plan which has been commissioned in May 2019.

Henties Bay has a National Traffic Information System (NaTIS) office and issues the number plate HB.

=== Tourism ===
The town is predominantly a tourist destination for anglers and 4x4 enthusiasts. Since the late 1990s, its real estate market has grown significantly, especially for high-end vacation homes. It serves as a gateway to the seal colony of Cape Cross, which lies 46 kilometres (29 miles) to the north of the town.

Henties Bay is situated in the National West Coast Recreation Area, but there are not many restrictions, particularly for driving off-road on the beach and across the plains. This brings tourists into the area, but puts a burden on the sensitive environment. Specifically endangered, are the lichen fields which take decades to recover from tracks cut through them, and the Damara tern which is endemic to the Skeleton Coast and threatened by habitat loss. A new multimillion-dollar tourism centre was inaugurated in October 2016.

== Politics ==
Henties Bay is governed by a municipal council that has seven seats. Henties Bay is home to the Civic Association of Henties Bay, a local political party which contests local elections. The mayor of Henties Bay is Titus Johannes.

The first local election run after independence of Namibia, the 1992 local elections, was narrowly won by SWAPO which obtained 365 votes and gained four seats. The Democratic Turnhalle Alliance (DTA) came second with 302 votes and three seats. The 1998 local authority elections was won by the DTA. It obtained 565 votes and gained four seat. SWAPO came second with 346 votes and two seats. The remaining seat went to the United Democratic Front (UDF, 135 votes).

From 2004 to 2010, the local authority of Henties Bay included three members of the Civic Association, three SWAPO members and one member of the UDF. In the 2010 local election, the Civic Association received most votes (approximately 44%), while SWAPO finished in 2nd place with approximately 37% of the votes. The Rally for Democracy and Progress, which was the party of opposition in the National Assembly following the 2009 general election, also contested the election and received 4%.

The 2015 local authority elections were won by SWAPO who gained three seats (702 votes). Two seats went to the UDF (357 votes), while the Civic Association and the DTA gained one seat each with 266 and 129 votes, respectively. The 2020 local authority election was narrowly won by the Republican Party (RP). It obtained 543 votes and gained two seats. SWAPO came second with 539 votes and also won two seats. One seat each was obtained by the Independent Patriots for Change (IPC, newly formed in August 2020, 297 votes), the UDF (269 votes) and the Popular Democratic Movement (PDM, the new name of the DTA, 208 votes).

In November 2009, three town councillors, the town human resources manager and the town CEO were arrested on corruption charges stemming from the hiring of friends of the officials as general labourers in 2007.
