= Shambyu =

Kingdom in present-day Namibia

Coordinates: 17.9000°S 20.0167°E

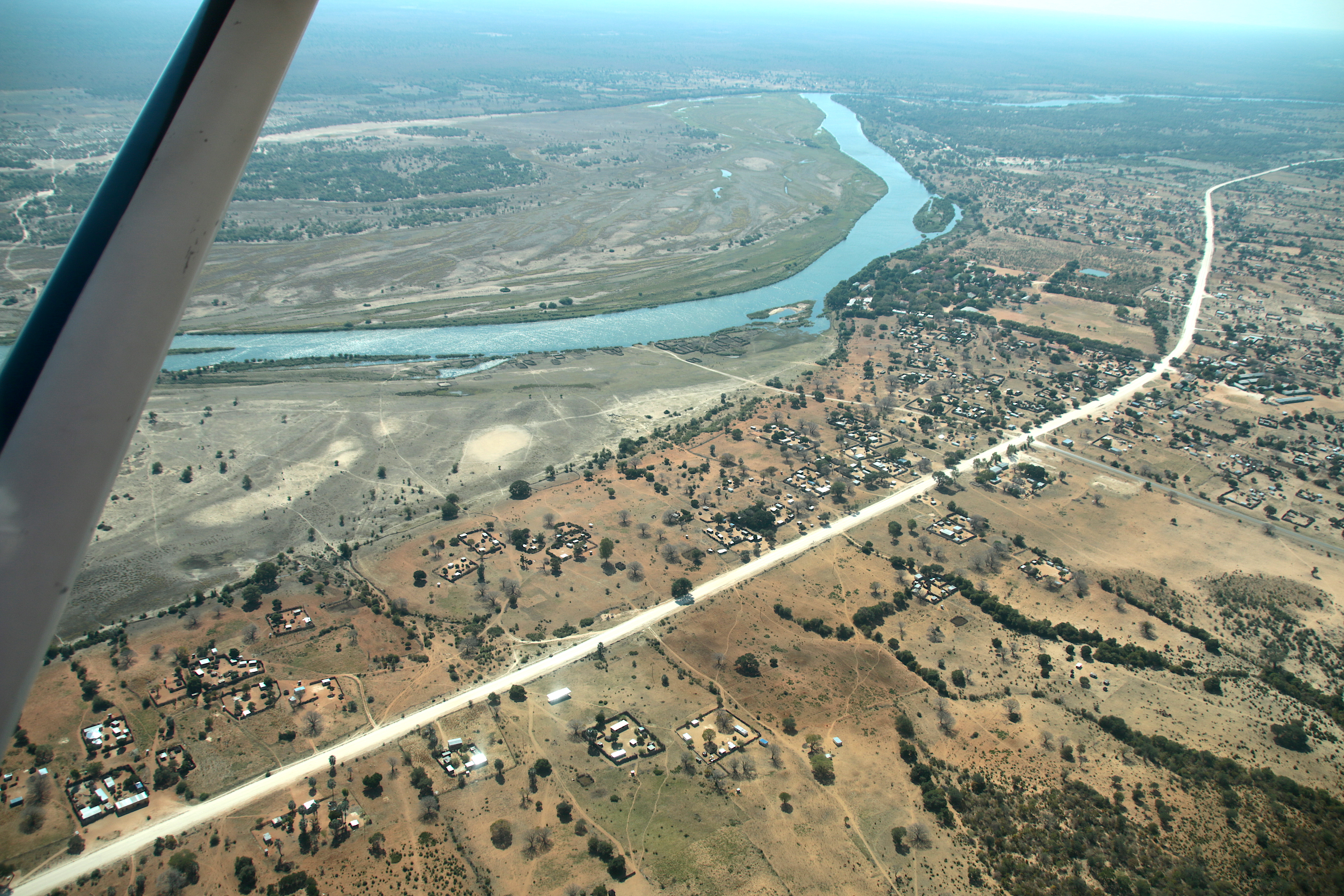
Shambyu is a traditional Kavango kingdom in what is today Namibia.

Shambyu is a traditional Kavango kingdom in what is today Namibia. Its people speak the Shambyu language.

== List of rulers ==
The following list is incomplete:

- King Mbanbangandu II (Before 1947)
- Queen Maria Mwengere (1947–1987)
- King Gothard Haininga (1988)
- Queen Angelina Matumbo Ribebe (1989–2015) – Sister of Gothard Hainiga
- Interregnum (2015–2023)
- Queen Sofia Mundjembwe Kanyetu (2023–present)
