= Kavangoland =

Bantustan in South West Africa (1970–1989)

- 1970–1989
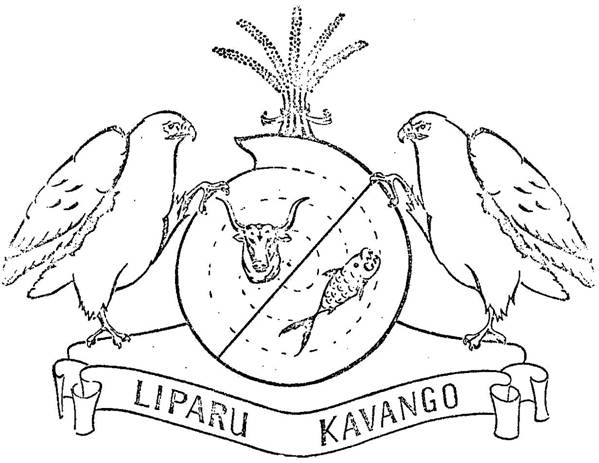
- Flag Coat of arms

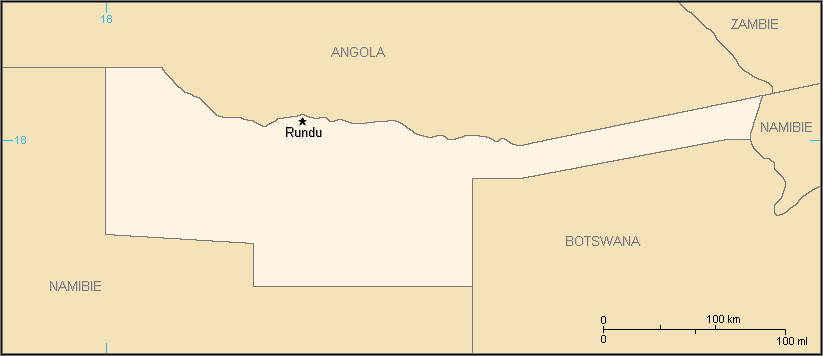
- Map of the Bantustan
- Status: Bantustan (1968–1980); Second-tier authority (1980–1989)
- Capital: Rundu
- History
  - Established: 1970
  - Re-integrated into Namibia: May 1989
- Currency: South African rand
Preceded by	Succeeded by
South West Africa	Namibia

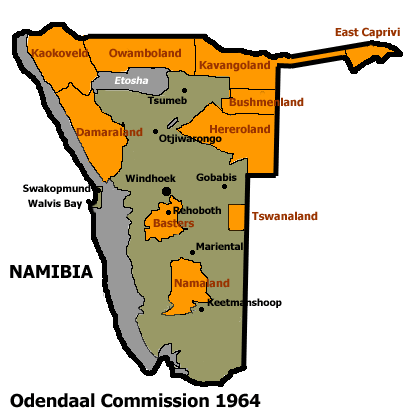
Allocation of land to Bantustans according to the Odendaal Plan. Kavangoland is in the top center.

Kavangoland was a Bantustan and then later a non-geographic ethnic-based second-tier authority, the Representative Authority of the Kavangos, in South West Africa (present-day Namibia), intended by the apartheid government to be a self-governing homeland for the Kavango people.

== Administrative history ==
=== Bantustan (1968–1980) ===
After the legal framework was established in 1968 as the Development of Self-Government for Native Nations in South-West Africa Act, 1968 (Act No. 54 of 1968), Kavangoland was set up in 1970 and self-government was granted in 1973. The Kavango Legislative Council had its administrative headquarters in Rundu; its first session opened in October 1970 in the presence of the South African Minister for Bantu Administration and Development.

=== Representative authority (1980–1989) ===
Following the Turnhalle Constitutional Conference the system of Bantustans was replaced in 1980 by Representative Authorities which functioned on the basis of ethnicity only and were no longer based on geographically defined areas.

The Representative Authority of the Kavangos had executive and legislative competencies, being made up of elected Legislative Assemblies which would appoint Executive Committees led by chairmen.

As second-tier authorities, forming an intermediate tier between central and local government, the representative authorities had responsibility for land tenure, agriculture, education up to primary level, teachers' training, health services, and social welfare and pensions and their Legislative Assemblies had the ability to pass legislation known as Ordinances.

=== Transition to independence (1989–1990) ===
Kavangoland, like other homelands in South West Africa, was abolished in May 1989 at the start of the transition to independence.

== Leadership ==
Sebastian Kamwanga, Hompa (king) of the Gciriku and member of the Democratic Turnhalle Alliance (DTA) was the chairman of the executive committee from 1981 to 1989.

== See also ==
- Apartheid
- 1971–72 Kavango & Ovambo contract workers strike
