= Civic Association of Henties Bay =

Political party in Namibia

The Civic Association of Henties Bay is a local political party based in Henties Bay in the Erongo Region of Namibia. It contests local elections for the municipality of Henties Bay.

In the 2004 local elections, the Civic Association won 3 seats in the council, Namibia's ruling SWAPO party won another three, and one seat went to the United Democratic Front (UDF). In the 2010 local elections, the party polled the highest number of votes (nearly 44%) in the Henties Bay local authority, ahead of the ruling party nationally, SWAPO, which received 36.9%. In the 2015 local authority elections, the Civic Association only gained one seat while SWAPO won three and the UDF won two.
