= Rundu Secondary School =

Government school in Namibia

Coordinates: 17.91815°S 19.78061°E

Information
- Established: 1967; 58 years ago

Rundu Secondary School is a government school in Rundu in the Kavango East region of north-eastern Namibia. It has been founded in 1967 as part of the Odendaal Plan and was at that time the only secondary school in Kavango Region.

== Alumni ==
- Raphael Dinyando (1960–2013), politician and diplomat
- John Mutorwa, member of cabinet

== See also ==
- Education in Namibia
- List of schools in Namibia
