= Sebastian Kamwanga =

Sebastian Kamwanga (29 April 1929 – 22 January 1999) was a Hompa (king) of the Gciriku, one of five kingdoms of the Kavango people in northern Namibia, from 1985 to 1999. His royal seat was situated at Mamono. He sat in the Legislative Council and the Executive Council of Kavangoland from 1973 until Namibian independence in 1990 when Bantustans were abolished along with the South African apartheid occupation of South-West Africa.

Kamwanga was born on 29 April 1929 in the village of Shankara in the Kavango Region. He completed teacher education at Döbra in 1951 and began training as Roman Catholic Catechist at Bunya Catholic Mission in 1959.

Soon after being crowned Hompa of the Gciriku in 1985, Kamwanga drew criticism from his peer traditional leaders in the Kavango kingdom for referring to himself as Nkuruhompa (paramount chief), implying that he was the prime leader of the Kavango and paramount over the other four vaHompa. This turned out to be a misunderstanding because he was chairman of the Executive Council of Kavangoland at that time and as such indeed in a position of power, albeit in modern rather than traditional politics.

Sebastian Kamwanga was a member of the Democratic Turnhalle Alliance (DTA) but nevertheless friendly towards SWAPO people and aims. In the mid-1980s his farm Shamangomba was used as People's Liberation Army of Namibia (PLAN) operational base for their guerrilla actions in the Namibian struggle for independence against the South African army.

He was a passionate pianist, performing at church services, and assisted with the Bible translation from Afrikaans into Rumanyo, his native tongue. Seven children resulted from his marriage to Regina Nankali Mberema. Kamwanga died on 22 January 1999.
