= Maria Mwengere =

Namibian queen (1898–1947)

- Hompa of the Sambyu Kingdom
- Reign: 1940–1987
- Predecessor: King Mbambangandu II
- Successor: Queen Matumbo Angelina Ribene
- Born: 1898; Kingdom of Barotse
- Died: 1987 (aged 88–89)
- Issue: Nankali

Maria Mwengere (c.1898–1987) was a ruler in what is now Namibia.

She reigned as queen or hompa of the Shambyu or Sambyu kingdom from 1940 until her death in 1987.

When the previous king, Mbambangandu II, withdrew from power because of his blindness, four of his nieces were candidates for the chieftancy. Mwengere was reportedly appointed "because of her outstanding leadership qualities". Becker noted that: "Unlike in Owambo, where the traditional authorities lost much respect because of their collaboration with the colonial regime, the locals' positive assessment of Mwengere's rule appears to be untainted by her co-operation with the South African administration."

Mwengere died in 1987 leaving no living children. She had expressed the wish that her favourite grand-daughter Matumbo Angelina Ribene should succeed her. Matumbo's mother Nankali, Mwengere's daughter, had died when Matumbo was aged eight, and she had grown up in Mwengere's household. Matumbo felt too young to accept the position and it passed to Mwengere's older brother. He died within a year, and Matumbo agreed to stand for election as one of ten royal candidates, seven male and three female: she gained the highest vote. Although initially lacking confidence in the role because of her youth, she later "cited herself as the best example for other women to overcome their 'shyness' and take on leadership in the community". Ribene died on 14 June 2015.

Mwengere is commemorated in the names of the Maria Mwengere Culture and Environment Centre, location of the Kavango Museum; Maria Mwengere Street in Rundu, home to a campus of the University of Namibia; and the Maria Mwengere Secondary School.
