= Mukwe Constituency =

Electoral constituency in the Kavango East region of north-eastern Namibia

Coordinates: 16.8167°S 24.5833°E

Mukwe constituency (red) in the Kavango East region of Namibia

Mukwe is a constituency in the Kavango East region of Namibia. The district centre is the settlement of Mukwe. It had a population of 27,690 in 2011, up from 27,250 in 2001. The constituency contains the major settlements of Bagani, Kangongo and Divundu, and a number of small populated places such as Andara and Diyogha. As of 2020 the constituency had 16,678 registered voters.

There is a bilateral agreement with Angola to allow mutual near-border immigration without travel documents. This applies to a maximum distance of 30 km, and it is not valid for tourists.

== Elections ==
=== General elections ===
The day after the 2009 general election, the Electoral Commission of Namibia (ECN) called for a recount of Mukwe's ballots "after several political parties expressed their unhappiness over the counting process". There were 19 polling stations in the constituency. In the certified results, incumbent President and SWAPO candidate Hifikepunye Pohamba received 6,227 votes of the 8,542 accepted votes. The closest candidates to Pohamba were Ignatius Shixwameni of the All People's Party (APP, 661 votes) and Hidipo Hamutenya of the Rally for Democracy and Progress (RDP, 343 votes).

=== Regional elections ===
In the 2010 local and regional elections, SWAPO's Christian Muriki won a seat in the Kavango Regional Council with 3,774 votes over APP's Pankratius Kutenda with 783 votes. Petrus Dishara of the Democratic Turnhalle Alliance (DTA) finished in third place with 414 votes and RDP's Justina Ngombara finished in last place with 117 votes. The 2015 regional elections were again a landslide win for Swapo. Johannes John Haushiku Thighuru received 5,541 votes while Venantius Kambogho of the APP received 484 votes and Bernand Thimbonde of the DTA came third with 442 votes. The SWAPO candidate also won the 2020 regional election. Damian Marungu Maghambayi obtained 2,995 votes, far ahead of Benedict Dindo (APP, 596 votes).

== See also ==
- Constituencies of Namibia
