= Joseph Diescho =

Namibian writer and political analyst

- Born: 10 April 1955 (age 71); Andara, Namibia
- Occupations: Writer, political analyst

Joseph Diescho (born 10 April 1955) is a Namibian writer and political analyst. In 1988, he wrote Born of the Sun, the first novel by a native-born Namibian author.

== Biography ==
Born in Andara, Kavango Region, Diescho attended Fort Hare University in South Africa where he studied law and political science. During his student days he worked against the apartheid system and was imprisoned in Peddie and East London. Whilst working for a diamond mine company he helped found a worker's union. In 1984, he became a Fulbright scholar at Columbia University in New York City, where he completed his PhD in Political Science in 1992. His dissertation, entitled, "The Role of Education in the Politics of Control in Namibia: 1948–1988," explored the relationship between politics and education in Namibia.

He was an award-winning television announcer for the programme South Africa Now! on American public television. In 1997–8, he was the founder and presenter of The Big Picture, a weekly economic and political analysis programme on SABC 2.

His novel Born of the Sun was published in the US in 1988 and his second novel Troubled Waters was published in 1993. He is one of Namibia's very few native born novelists.

Diescho was the executive director of the Namibian Institute of Public Administration and Management (NIPAM) from 1 July 2013 until December 2015 when he was dismissed without a clear reason.
