= 2021 FINA World Swimming Championships (25 m) – Men's 200 metre freestyle =

Swimming competition

Men's 200 metre freestyle at the 2021 FINA World Swimming Championships (25 m)
- Venue: Etihad Arena
- Location: Abu Dhabi, United Arab Emirates
- Dates: 17 December (heats and final)
- Competitors: 69 from 64 nations
- Winning time: 1:41.60

Medalists
gold medal	Hwang Sun-woo	South Korea
silver medal	Aleksandr Shchegolev
bronze medal	Danas Rapšys	Lithuania

The Men's 200 metre freestyle competition of the 2021 FINA World Swimming Championships (25 m) was held on 17 December 2021.

== Records ==
Prior to the competition, the existing world and championship records were as follows.

World record	Paul Biedermann (GER)	1:39.37	Berlin, Germany	15 November 2009
Competition record	Danas Rapšys (LTU)	1:40.95	Hangzhou, China	14 December 2018

== Results ==
=== Heats ===
The heats were started at 9:36.

Rank	Heat	Lane	Name	Nationality	Time	Notes
1	8	3	Fernando Scheffer	Brazil	1:42.42	Q
2	6	4	Hwang Sun-woo	South Korea	1:42.43	Q
3	8	4	Duncan Scott	Great Britain	1:42.58	Q
4	7	0	Kieran Smith	United States	1:42.64	Q
5	8	7	Aleksandr Shchegolev	Russian Swimming Federation	1:42.76	Q
6	7	4	Danas Rapšys	Lithuania	1:42.82	Q
6	7	7	Antonio Djakovic	Switzerland	1:42.82	Q, NR
8	6	6	Matteo Ciampi	Italy	1:42.99	Q
9	7	5	Luc Kroon	Netherlands	1:43.05	
10	6	3	Murilo Sartori	Brazil	1:43.08	
11	8	6	Jack McMillan	Ireland	1:43.13	
12	7	2	Felix Auböck	Austria	1:43.49	
13	8	1	Kregor Zirk	Estonia	1:43.58	
14	8	5	David Popovici	Romania	1:43.62	
15	8	2	Velimir Stjepanović	Serbia	1:43.97	
16	6	8	Denis Loktev	Israel	1:44.08	
17	4	5	Alfonso Mestre	Venezuela	1:44.26	
18	8	8	Jordan Pothain	France	1:44.34	
19	5	3	Hong Jinquan	China	1:44.78	
20	6	2	Baturalp Ünlü	Turkey	1:44.79	
21	7	3	Stan Pijnenburg	Netherlands	1:44.85	
22	7	6	Ivan Giryov	Russian Swimming Federation	1:45.08	
23	6	1	Marco De Tullio	Italy	1:45.63	
24	8	0	Thomas Thijs	Belgium	1:45.92	
25	5	0	Mikel Schreuders	Aruba	1:46.08	NR
26	5	1	Marwan Elkamash	Egypt	1:46.11	NR
27	5	9	Juan Morales	Colombia	1:46.30	NR
28	5	6	Cheuk Ming Ho	Hong Kong	1:46.50	
28	7	1	Jordan Sloan	Ireland	1:46.50	
30	7	8	Lukas Martens	Germany	1:46.52	
31	4	4	Sajan Prakash	India	1:46.61	NR
32	6	0	Dimitrios Markos	Greece	1:46.90	
33	5	7	Alex Sobers	Barbados	1:46.91	NR
34	5	5	Max Mannes	Luxembourg	1:47.61	
35	4	1	Xander Skinner	Namibia	1:47.66	NR
36	8	9	Joaquín Vargas	Peru	1:48.05	
37	7	9	Mohamed Lagili	Tunisia	1:48.18	
38	4	3	Nguyễn Huy Hoàng	Vietnam	1:48.19	
39	5	4	Yordan Yanchev	Bulgaria	1:48.60	
40	4	0	Mohamed Djaballah	Algeria	1:48.97	
41	5	2	Luka Kukhalashvili	Georgia	1:49.53	
42	5	8	Supha Sangaworawong	Thailand	1:50.25	
43	4	7	Omar Abbass	Syria	1:50.50	
44	3	9	James Allison	Cayman Islands	1:50.67	
45	3	4	Nikola Bjelajac	Bosnia and Herzegovina	1:50.89	
46	4	8	Pavel Alovatki	Moldova	1:51.26	
47	3	7	Ado Gargović	Montenegro	1:51.42	NR
48	4	2	Dylan Cachia	Malta	1:51.49	
49	3	6	Ridhwan Mohamed	Kenya	1:51.79	NR
50	1	6	Ramazan Omarov	Kyrgyzstan	1:52.68	
51	4	9	Henrique Mascarenhas	Angola	1:52.88	
52	2	2	Ghalib Sabt	United Arab Emirates	1:52.94	
53	3	3	Bartal Erlingsson Eidesgaard	Faroe Islands	1:53.03	
54	3	2	Ahmed Ali Al-Hazemi	Saudi Arabia	1:53.55	NR
55	3	0	Stefano Mitchell	Netherlands Antilles	1:53.68	
56	1	2	Adrián Navarro	Cuba	1:53.99	
57	3	8	Matin Balsini	Iran	1:54.47	
58	2	6	Batbayaryn Enkhtamir	Mongolia	1:55.82	
59	2	4	Christopher Gossmann	Guatemala	1:55.84	
60	2	5	Gerald Hernández	Nicaragua	1:56.08	
61	2	3	Davor Petrovski	North Macedonia	1:56.54	
62	1	7	Jinnosuke Suzuki	Northern Mariana Islands	1:57.27	
63	2	1	Nasir Yahya Hussain	Nepal	1:58.30	NR
64	1	4	Matt Savitz	Gibraltar	1:58.69	
65	1	3	Yaseen Al-Atieh	Kuwait	2:00.68	
66	2	9	Vladimir Mamikonyan	Armenia	2:00.92	
67	2	0	Israel Poppe	Guam	2:03.89	
68	2	7	Raekwon Noel	Guyana	2:06.28	
69	1	5	Solomon Beraki	Eritrea	2:47.29	
	2	8	Ailton Lima	Cape Verde	DNS	
	3	1	Issa Al-Adawi	Oman	DNS	
	3	5	Pedro Chiancone	Uruguay	DNS	
	4	6	Henrik Christiansen	Norway	DNS	
	6	5	Tom Dean	Great Britain	DNS	
	6	7	Chad le Clos	South Africa	DNS	
	6	9	Glen Lim Jun Wei	Singapore	DNS	

=== Final ===
The final was held at 18:55 24 Hour Time .

Rank	Lane	Name	Nationality	Time	Notes
1st place, gold medalist(s)	5	Hwang Sun-woo	South Korea	1:41.60	
2nd place, silver medalist(s)	2	Aleksandr Shchegolev	Russian Swimming Federation	1:41.63	
3rd place, bronze medalist(s)	7	Danas Rapšys	Lithuania	1:41.73	
4	3	Duncan Scott	Great Britain	1:42.27	
5	6	Kieran Smith	United States	1:42.29	
6	1	Antonio Djakovic	Switzerland	1:42.47	NR
7	4	Fernando Scheffer	Brazil	1:42.69	
8	8	Matteo Ciampi	Italy	1:42.76	
