= Mbukushu =

Lozi ethnic group in Southern Africa

Hambukushu

Total population
- 124,422

Regions with significant populations
- Namibia: 51,422 (2023 Census)
- Botswana: 43,000
- Angola: 17,000
- Zambia: 13,000

Languages
- Thimbukushu

Religion
- Christianity • African traditional religion

Related ethnic groups
- Lozi people • Kavango people

The Mbukushu people, also known as the Hambukushu, are a Bantu-speaking ethnic group indigenous to Southern Africa. They are part of the larger Lozi ethnic group and have significant populations in Angola, Botswana, Namibia, and Zambia, numbering around 120,000.

In Namibia, the Mbukushu hold traditional authority and are one of the five Kavango Kingdoms. They speak the Mbukushu language, known as Thimbukushu.

The Hambukushu originate from Barotseland and primarily reside in Ngamiland, within the Okavango Delta. The Tswana people of Botswana refer to them as "Mbukushu," but they call themselves "Hambukushu." An individual from the tribe is referred to as a Mbukushu.

The Hambukushu are renowned for their rain-making abilities in the Okavango Delta, earning them the title "The Rain-makers of Okavango." They are also celebrated for their basket weaving artistry, and their women are known for using traps to catch fish.

== Overview ==
The Hambukushu people, also known as Hakokuhu, form an ethnic group indigenous to the lands along the Okavango River in Namibia, Botswana and Angola, as well as in they are found in Zambia. This Bantu-speaking community has a rich cultural heritage deeply intertwined with the unique ecological environment of the vegetation along the Kavango River. The Hambukushu are one of the five kingdoms of the Kavango people.

== Geography and Settlements ==
The majority of Hambukushu people are concentrated along the Kavango River and surrounding lands, an ecologically diverse area that includes the Okavango Delta. This region, characterized by its lush vegetation, intricate waterways, and abundant wildlife, significantly influences the traditional livelihoods and cultural practices of the Hambukushu.

The Hambukushu settlements often align with the natural resources of the Kavango River and surrounding lands. Villages are strategically located near water sources, reflecting the community's reliance on fishing, farming, and livestock keeping.

== Language and Communication ==
The Hambukushu people speak a Bantu language known as Mbukushu language. Oral traditions are paramount in Hambukushu society, with storytelling and oral history passing down from generation to generation.

The linguistic diversity within the Hambukushu community may exhibit regional variations, contributing to the uniqueness of their cultural identity.

== Notable Locations within the Hambukushu Kingdom ==
- Divundu
- Shakawe
- Kangongo
- Andara
- Bwabwata National Park
- Okavango Delta
- Kongola
