= Divundu =

- Village
- Location in Namibia
- Coordinates: 18°7′S 21°37.5′E
- Country: Namibia
- Region: Kavango East
- Constituency: Mukwe Constituency
- Settled: 1850
- Declared settlement area: 2009
- Proclaimed village: 2015
- Elevation: 1,090 m (3,580 ft)

Population (2023)
  - Total: 5,787
- Time zone: UTC+2 (SAST)
- Area code: +66
- Number plate: DV
- Climate: BSh

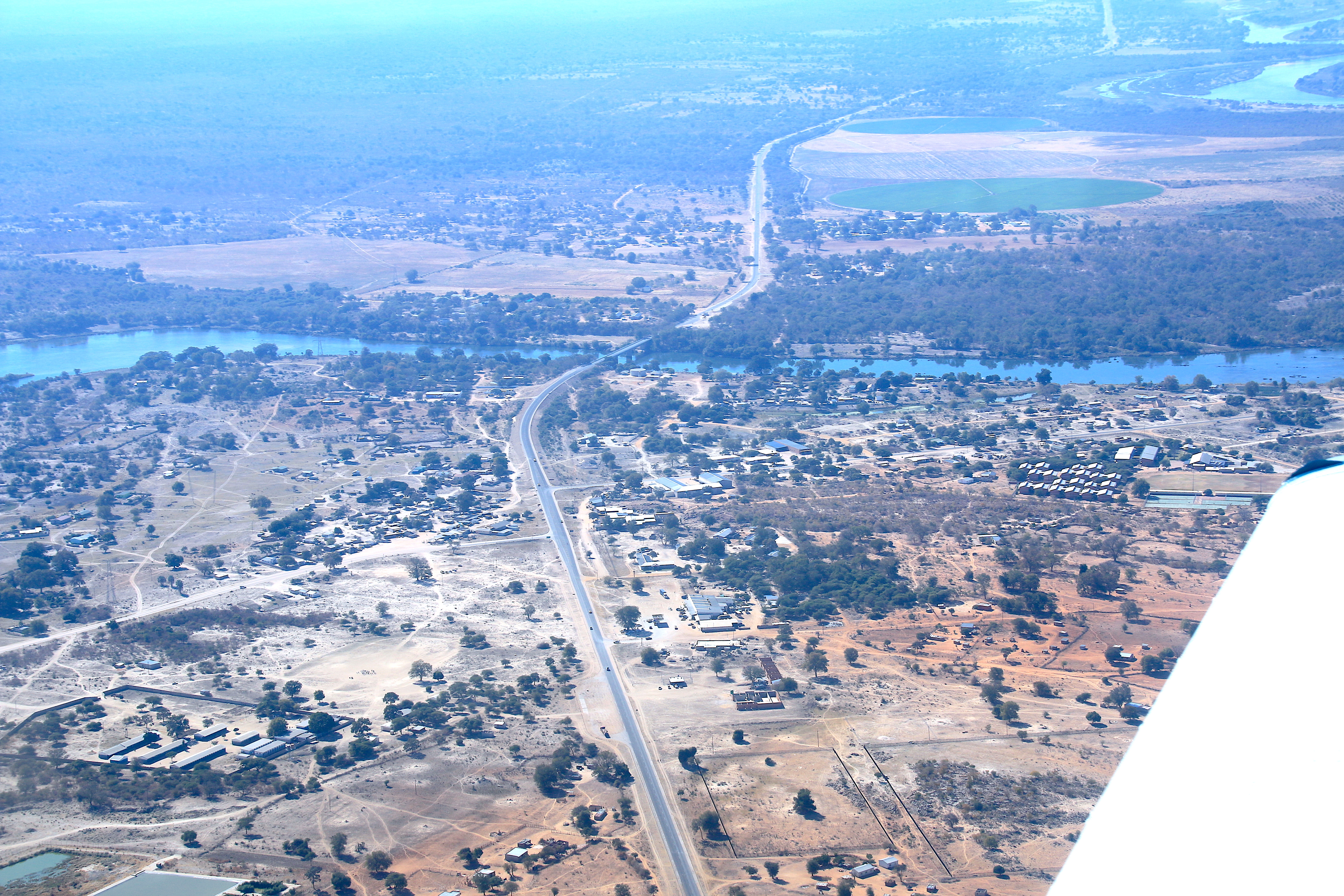

Divundu (1.090 m above sea level) is a village on the south-western banks of the Okavango River in the Kavango East Region of Namibia, 200 kilometres (120 mi) east of Rundu. Divundu is the homestead of the local Hambukushu kings and had a population of 5,787 inhabitants in 2023.

On the opposite, north-eastern banks of the river lies Kakutji in Angola, and the two settlements are linked via a nearby border post.

== Economy and infrastructure ==
Divundu is situated on the Walvis Bay-Ndola-Lubumbashi Development Road, in Namibia designated the national road B8. It also connects south-east to Botswana via the C48. Divundu has a National Traffic Information System (NaTIS) office and issues the number plate DV.

The Divundu Correctional Facility is one of Namibia's seven major prisons.

Historical population
Year	Pop.	±% p.a.
2011	746	—
2023	5,787	+18.62%

=== Tourism ===
Game drives to the nearby national park, Bwabwata National Park, which is well known for the diversity of wildlife in typical riverine and swampland habitat, are popular amongst tourists. Tourists frequent the many nearby lodges, which offer boat cruises to the Popa Falls, as well as camping facilities and guided village tours to the local villages.

== Politics ==
Divundu was declared a settlement area in 2009. In 2015 its status was upgraded to a village. Since then, it is governed by a village council that has five seats. Athanasius Ndjamba Maghumbo is the CEO of Divundu Village Council (DVC).

SWAPO won the 2015 local authority election and gained four seats (631 votes). The remaining seat went to the All People's Party (APP) with 68 votes. SWAPO also won the 2020 local authority election, obtaining 433 votes and gaining three seats. One seat each went to the APP (100 votes) and the Independent Patriots for Change (IPC), an opposition party formed in August 2020, that gained 49 votes.

== Notable people ==
- Raphael Dinyando (1960–2013), former Deputy Minister of Information and Broadcasting
