= List of Namibian records in swimming =

This is a list of national swimming records for Namibia. These are the fastest times ever swum by a swimmer representing Namibia. These records are tracked/maintained by Namibia's national aquatic federation: Namibia Aquatic Sports Federation (NASFED).

All records were set in finals unless noted otherwise.

== Long Course (50 m) ==
=== Men ===
Event	Time		Name	Club	Date	Meet	Location	Ref
50 m freestyle	22.67		Xander Skinner	Namibia	13 March 2024	African Games	Accra, Ghana	
100 m freestyle	49.97		Xander Skinner	Namibia	9 March 2024	African Games	Accra, Ghana	
200 m freestyle	1:52.11	h	Xander Skinner	Namibia	7 April 2022 (Note: by official meet schedule, 6 April 2022 by SA source, a typo)	South African Championships	Port Elizabeth, South Africa	
400 m freestyle	3:58.57	h	Oliver Durand	Namibia	19 August 2025	World Junior Championships	Otopeni, Romania	
800 m freestyle	8:25.48		Phillip Seidler	Namibia	6 April 2017	South African Championships	Durban, South Africa	
1500 m freestyle	16:07.86		Phillip Seidler	Namibia	23 April 2018	South African Championships	Durban, South Africa	
50 m backstroke	26.54		Ronan Wantenaar	Namibia	11 March 2023	Malaysia Open Championships	Kuala Lumpur, Malaysia	
100 m backstroke	56.87	r	Oliver Durand	Namibia	29 July 2026	Commonwealth Games	Glasgow, United Kingdom	
200 m backstroke	2:05.80	h	Lushano Lamprecht	Namibia	22 August 2014	Youth Olympic Games	Nanjing, China	
50 m breaststroke	26.85	h	Ronan Wantenaar	Namibia	29 July 2025	World Championships	Singapore, Singapore	
100 m breaststroke	1:00.53		Ronan Wantenaar	World Aquatics	10 May 2025	Giant Open	Saint-Denis, France	
200 m breaststroke	2:15.27		Ronan Wantenaar	World Aquatics	9 May 2025	Giant Open	Saint-Denis, France	
50 m butterfly	24.91		Luke Beukes	Namibia	6 May 2026	African Championships	Oran, Algeria	
100 m butterfly	53.98	sf	Oliver Durand	Namibia	25 July 2026	Commonwealth Games	Glasgow, United Kingdom	
200 m butterfly	2:01.84	h	Oliver Durand	Namibia	27 July 2026	Commonwealth Games	Glasgow, United Kingdom	
200 m individual medley	2:02.81	h	Oliver Durand	Namibia	20 August 2025	World Junior Championships	Otopeni, Romania	
400 m individual medley	4:23.92	h	Oliver Durand	Namibia	23 August 2025	World Junior Championships	Otopeni, Romania	
4×50 m freestyle relay	1:37.70		Xander Skinner; Lushano Lamprecht; C. Lamprecht; Nicolai Flemming	Namibia	10 December 2014	Region 5 Youth Games		
4×100 m freestyle relay	3:28.55	h	Luke Beukes (51.15); Oliver Durand (50.93); Jose Canjulo (52.22); Ronan Wanternaar (54.25)	Namibia	24 July 2026	Commonwealth Games	Glasgow, United Kingdom	
4×200 m freestyle relay	8:05.60	h	Nicolai Flemming (2:00.65); Phillip Seidler (2:01.92); Lushano Lamprecht (2:01.09); Xander Skinner (2:01.94)	Namibia	28 August 2015 (Note: by official result source, 25 August 2022 by SA source, a typo)	World Junior Championships	Singapore, Singapore	
4×50 m medley relay	1:49.73		José Canjulo; Ronan Wantenaar; Lushano Lamprecht; Brave Magongo	Aqua Swimming and Fitness Club	24 February 2022	Namibian Championships	Windhoek, Namibia	
4×100 m medley relay	3:44.58		Oliver Durand (56.87); Ronan Wantenaar (1:02.38); Jose Canjulo (55.55); Luke Beukes (49.78)	Namibia	29 July 2026	Commonwealth Games	Glasgow, United Kingdom	

Legend: # – Record awaiting ratification by Namibia Aquatic Sports Federation; WR – World record; AF – African record; e – equalled existing record;
Records not set in finals: h – heat; sf – semifinal; r – relay 1st leg; rh – relay heat 1st leg; b – B final; † – en route to final mark; so – swim-off; tt – time trial

=== Women ===
Event	Time		Name	Club	Date	Meet	Location	Ref
50 m freestyle	26.33	h	Jessica Humphrey	Namibia	28 July 2026	Commonwealth Games	Glasgow, United Kingdom	
100 m freestyle	57.63		Monica Dahl	MAR	1996	-		
200 m freestyle	2:09.58		Sonja Adelaar	Namibia	20 August 2014	Youth Olympic Games	Nanjing, China	
400 m freestyle	4:33.47		Anita Kruger	MAR	1996	-		
800 m freestyle	9:25.14		Anita Kruger	MAR	1996	-		
1500 m freestyle	18:12.28		Madison Bergh	Namibia	30 April 2025	African Junior Championships	Otopeni, Romania	
50 m backstroke	28.88	sf	Jessica Humphrey	Namibia	27 July 2026	Commonwealth Games	Glasgow, United Kingdom	
100 m backstroke	1:01.83	h	Jessica Humphrey	Namibia	25 July 2026	Commonwealth Games	Glasgow, United Kingdom	
200 m backstroke	2:14.52	h	Zanre Oberholzer	Namibia	2 August 2013	World Championships	Barcelona, Spain	
50 m breaststroke	32.69		Daniela Lindemeier	Namibia	8 September 2015	African Games	Brazzaville, Congo	
100 m breaststroke	1:11.31		Daniela Lindemeier	Namibia	9 September 2015	African Games	Brazzaville, Congo	
200 m breaststroke	2:33.42	h	Daniela Lindemeier	Namibia	7 September 2015	African Games	Brazzaville, Congo	
50 m butterfly	27.97	h	Jessica Humphery	Namibia	24 July 2026	Commonwealth Games	Glasgow, United Kingdom	
100 m butterfly	1:04.26		Monica Dahl	MAR	1994	-		
200 m butterfly	2:25.92		Dorothea Neumeister	MAR	1981	-		
200 m individual medley	2:22.54	h	Sonja Adelaar	Namibia	17 August 2014	Youth Olympic Games	Nanjing, China	
400 m individual medley	5:05.80		Dorothea Neumeister	MAR	1981	-		
4×100 m freestyle relay	4:11.33			SWA C.C. Team	1980	-		
4×200 m freestyle relay	9:08.62			Namibia	1992	-		
4×100 m medley relay	4:32.98		Jessica Humphrey (1:06.00); Molina Smalley (1:17.82); Reza Westerduin (1:06.63); Trisha Mutumbulua (1:02.53)	Namibia	13 March 2024	African Games	Accra, Ghana	

Legend: # – Record awaiting ratification by Namibia Aquatic Sports Federation; WR – World record; AF – African record; e – equalled existing record;
Records not set in finals: h – heat; sf – semifinal; r – relay 1st leg; rh – relay heat 1st leg; b – B final; † – en route to final mark; so – swim-off; tt – time trial

=== Mixed relay ===
Event	Time		Name	Club	Date	Meet	Location	Ref
4×50 m freestyle relay	1:50.14		Antonia Roth; Kiara Schatz; Jörn Diekmann; Xander Skinner	Namibia	23 May 2014	-		
4×100 m freestyle relay	3:43.88		Xander Skinner (50.26); Oliver Durand (52.22); Jessica Humphrey (1:00.02); Molina Smalley (1:01.38)	Namibia	9 March 2024	African Games	Accra, Ghana	
4×50 m medley relay	1:56.91		Zanre Oberholzer; Nicolai Flemming; Lushano Lamprecht; Sonja Adelaar	Namibia	23 May 2014			
4×100 m medley relay	4:13.50	h	Jose Canjulo (1:01.70); Ronan Wanternaar (1:02.96); Reza Westerduin (1:06.89); Trisha Mutumbulua (1:01.95)	Namibia	10 March 2024	African Games	Accra, Ghana	

Legend: # – Record awaiting ratification by Namibia Aquatic Sports Federation; WR – World record; AF – African record; e – equalled existing record;
Records not set in finals: h – heat; so – swim-off

== Short course (25 m) ==
=== Men ===
Event	Time		Name	Club	Date	Meet	Location	Ref
50 m freestyle	21.85	h	Xander Skinner	Namibia	16 December 2022	World Championships	Melbourne, Australia	
100 m freestyle	48.40	h	Xander Skinner	Namibia	20 December 2021	World Championships	Abu Dhabi, United Arab Emirates	
200 m freestyle	1:47.66	h	Xander Skinner	Namibia	17 December 2021	World Championships	Abu Dhabi, United Arab Emirates	
400 m freestyle	3:55.85		Oliver Durand	Namibia	8 July 2025	Region 5 Games	Swakopmund, Namibia	
800 m freestyle	8:10.69		Phillip Seidler	Dolphins	6 November 2020	NASU Long/Short Course Gala	Windhoek, Namibia	
1500 m freestyle	15:35.99		Phillip Seidler	Dolphins	19 September 2019	Namibian Championships	Swakopmund, Namibia	
50 m backstroke	25.76		Ronan Wantenaar	Aqua	1 September 2021	Republic of Tatarstan Gala		
100 m backstroke	53.73		Oliver Durand	Namibia	5 July 2025	Region 5 Games	Swakopmund, Namibia	
200 m backstroke	1:57.92		Oliver Durand	Namibia	7 July 2025	Region 5 Games	Swakopmund, Namibia	
50 m breaststroke	27.45	h	Ronan Wantenaar	Namibia	17 December 2022	World Championships	Melbourne, Australia	
50 m breaststroke	26.15	h, #	Ronan Wantenaar	Namibia	14 December 2024	World Championships	Budapest, Hungary	
100 m breaststroke	1:00.35	h	Ronan Wantenaar	Namibia	14 December 2022	World Championships	Melbourne, Australia	
100 m breaststroke	58.59	h, #	Ronan Wantenaar	Namibia	11 December 2024	World Championships	Budapest, Hungary	
200 m breaststroke	2:13.17		Ronan Wantenaar	Namibia	23 December 2023	Thailand Age Group Championships	Samutprakan, Thailand	
50 m butterfly	24.82	h	Xander Skinner	Namibia	5 November 2022	World Cup	Indianapolis, United States	
100 m butterfly	53.31		Oliver Durand	Dolphins	28 September 2025	Namibian Championships	Swakopmund, Namibia	
200 m butterfly	2:01.18		Oliver Durand	Namibia	6 July 2025	Region 5 Games	Swakopmund, Namibia	
100 m individual medley	55.76		Oliver Durand	Dolphins	25 September 2026	Namibian Championships	Swakopmund, Namibia	
200 m individual medley	2:03.32		Ronan Wantenaar	Namibia	21 October 2022	Thailand Championships	Thailand	
200 m individual medley	2:02.09	not ratified	Ronan Wantenaar	Namibia	21 December 2023	Thailand Age Group Championships	Samutprakan, Thailand	
200 m individual medley	1:59.26	h, #	Oliver Durand	Namibia	10 December 2024	World Championships	Budapest, Hungary	
400 m individual medley	4:31.82		Oliver Durand	Dolphins	28 September 2023	NASFED Nationals	Namibia	
400 m individual medley	4:16.99	h, #	Oliver Durand	Namibia	14 December 2024	World Championships	Budapest, Hungary	
4×50 m freestyle relay	1:39.10		B. Theron; A. Oberholster; A. Loftie-Eaton; Xander Skinner	Dolphins	17 June 2015	-		
4×100 m freestyle relay	3:33.86			Namib Swim Academy	23 January 2015	-		
4×200 m freestyle relay	-			-		-		
4×50 m medley relay	1:47.01			Namib Swim Academy	23 January 2015	-		
4×100 m medley relay				-		-		

Legend: # – Record awaiting ratification by Namibia Aquatic Sports Federation; WR – World record; AF – African record; e – equalled existing record;
Records not set in finals: h – heat; sf – semifinal; r – relay 1st leg; rh – relay heat 1st leg; b – B final; † – en route to final mark; so – swim-off; tt – time trial

=== Women ===
Event	Time		Name	Club	Date	Meet	Location	Ref
50 m freestyle	25.97		Jessica Humphery	Aqua Club	27 September 2026	Namibian Championships	Swakopmund, Namibia	
100 m freestyle	56.35		Jessica Humphery	Aqua Club	24 September 2026	Namibian Championships	Swakopmund, Namibia	
200 m freestyle	2:04.25		Jessica Humphery	Aqua Club	26 September 2026	Namibian Championships	Swakopmund, Namibia	
400 m freestyle	4:24.51		Vitoria De Sousa	Dolphins	24 September 2026	Namibian Championships	Swakopmund, Namibia	
800 m freestyle	9:05.46		Madison Bergh	Marlins	27 September 2026	Namibian Championships	Swakopmund, Namibia	
1500 m freestyle	17:26.46		Madison Bergh	Marlins	23 September 2026	Namibian Championships	Swakopmund, Namibia	
50 m backstroke	27.36		Jessica Humphery	Aqua Club	24 September 2026	Namibian Championships	Swakopmund, Namibia	
100 m backstroke	59.38		Jessica Humphery	Aqua Club	26 September 2026	Namibian Championships	Swakopmund, Namibia	
200 m backstroke	2:10.95	h	Zanre Oberholzer	Namibia	5 December 2014	World Championships	Doha, Qatar	
50 m breaststroke	33.18	h	Daniela Lindemeier	NSA	3 December 2014	World Championships	Doha, Qatar	
100 m breaststroke	1:10.79	h	Daniela Lindemeier	NSA	5 December 2014	World Championships	Doha, Qatar	
200 m breaststroke	2:34.33	h	Antonia Roth	Namibia	7 December 2014	World Championships	Doha, Qatar	
50 m butterfly	27.97		Jessica Humphery	Aqua Club	25 September 2026	Namibian Championships	Swakopmund, Namibia	
100 m butterfly	1:01.44		Jessica Humphery	Aqua Club	27 September 2026	Namibian Championships	Swakopmund, Namibia	
200 m butterfly	-		-		-			
100 m individual medley	1:03.37		Jessica Humphery	Aqua Club	25 September 2026	Namibian Championships	Swakopmund, Namibia	
200 m individual medley	2:19.33	h	Sonja Adelaar	Namibia	6 December 2014	World Championships	Doha, Qatar	
400 m individual medley	4:57.68	h	Antonia Roth	Namibia	3 December 2014	World Championships	Doha, Qatar	
4×50m freestyle relay				-		-		
4×100m freestyle relay	-			-		-		
4×200m freestyle relay	-			-		-		
4×50m medley relay				-		-		
4×100m medley relay	4:20.81	h	Zanre Oberholzer (1:01.78); Daniela Lindemeier (1:12.96); Sonja Adelaar (1:05.10); Antonia Roth (1:00.97)	Namibia	7 December 2014	World Championships	Doha, Qatar	

Legend: # – Record awaiting ratification by Namibia Aquatic Sports Federation; WR – World record; AF – African record; e – equalled existing record;
Records not set in finals: h – heat; sf – semifinal; r – relay 1st leg; rh – relay heat 1st leg; b – B final; † – en route to final mark; so – swim-off; tt – time trial

=== Mixed relay ===
Event	Time		Name	Club	Date	Meet	Location	Ref
4×50 m freestyle relay	1:42.86		Byron Briedenhann; A. Ray; S. Van Zijl; A. Van Wyk	Namibia	18 September 2009	-		
4×50 m freestyle relay	1:39.68	h, #	Oliver Durand (21.08); Molina Smalley (21.80); Jessica Humphrey (23.52); Ronan Wantenaar (24.00)	Namibia	13 December 2024	World Championships	Budapest, Hungary	
4×100 m freestyle relay	3:51.37		A. Wellmann; T. Esslinger; Molina Smalley; Xander Skinner	Dolphins	28 September 2023			
4×50 m medley relay	1:46.63	h, #	Jessica Humphrey (28.50); Ronan Wantenaar (26.27); Oliver Durand (24.77); Molina Smalley (27.09)	Namibia	11 December 2024	World Championships	Budapest, Hungary	
4×100 m medley relay	4:18.80		A. Wellmann; Molina Smalley; M. Henning; Xander Skinner	Dolphins	28 September 2023			
4×100 m medley relay	3:54.78	h, #	Jessica Humphrey (1:01.56); Ronan Wantenaar (59.77); Oliver Durand (54.61); Molina Smalley (58.84)	Namibia	14 December 2024	World Championships	Budapest, Hungary	

Legend: # – Record awaiting ratification by Namibia Aquatic Sports Federation; WR – World record; AF – African record; e – equalled existing record;
Records not set in finals: h – heat; so – swim-off
