= C49 road (Namibia) =

Road in Namibia

C49 road

Major junctions
- East end: B8 Katima Mulilo
- West end: B8 Kongola

Location
- Country: Namibia

Highway system
- Transport in Namibia
← C48

The C49 is a tarred road in the Caprivi Strip of Namibia. It leaves and rejoins the B8, at Katima Mulilo and Kongola, respectively.

The C49 is 188 kilometres (117 mi) long and serves the communities Chinchimane, Linyanti, Sikwalo, Mantemwa, Dipito, Sangwali, Muneambuanas, and Luzibalule.
