= Popa Game Park =

Protected area in Namibia

Coordinates: 18.122°S 21.582°E

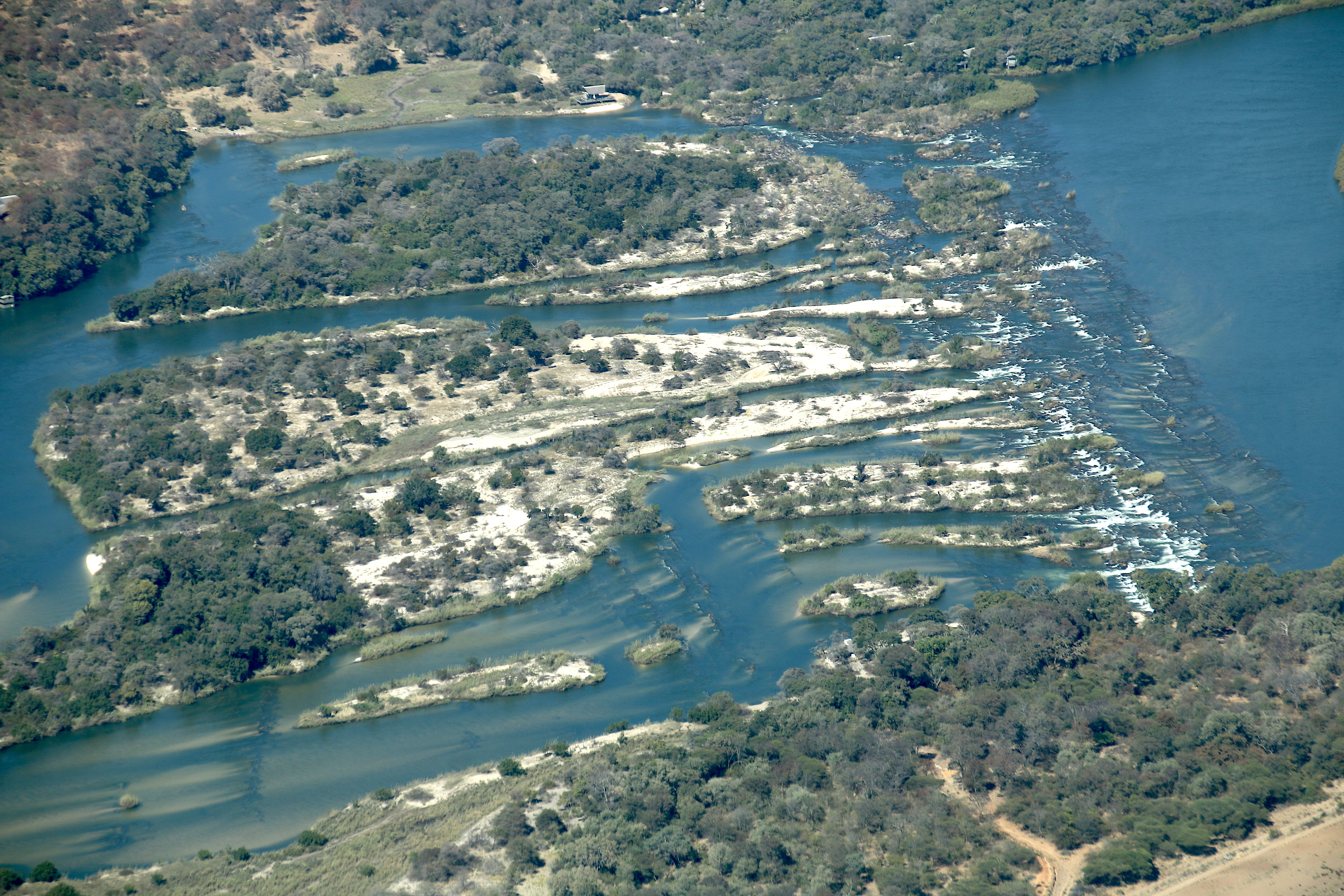
Popa falls, aerial view

The Popa Game Park is a game park in Namibia, situated around the series of cascading rapids known as Popa Falls in the Okavango River, where the river crosses the Caprivi Strip in Kavango East, between Divundu and Bagani. When the river runs low, one can see the difference in elevation, which is about 4 meters.

The game park, which measures 0.25 km^{2}, was founded in 1989. It contains hippopotamus, crocodiles and 417 bird species. The vegetation is lush savannah vegetation.

Suggested activities include hiking, angling and bird watching. Swimming is not an option due to the crocodiles.

Mahango Game Park is located nearby, at a distance of 14 km.
