= Andara =

- Settlement
- Location within Namibia
- Coordinates: 18°04′S 21°27′E
- Country: Namibia
- Region: Kavango East
- Constituency: Mukwe Constituency
- Time zone: UTC+2 (SAST)

Andara is a village in Mukwe Constituency in the Kavango East region of north-eastern Namibia. Located 200 kilometres (120 mi) east of Rundu, it is inhabited primarily by the Hambukushu people.

== Founding of the Catholic mission ==
Catholic fathers of the organization Missionary Oblates of Mary Immaculate founded the Andara Mission in 1913. Possibilities for this were examined already in 1903 and 1907, and in January 1908 fathers Franz Krist and Franz Lauer together with lay brother Georg Kurz founded the mission. Father Krist left back for Grootfontein after a few weeks, but he died along the way. When a new expedition arrived in Andara, they only found two graves. Lauer and Kurz had meanwhile died of blackwater fever.

The new expedition also ran into difficulties, when one its members misfired his gun and King Libebe of the Hambukushu turned hostile to the missionaries. They now had to move to the Gcirikus, to King Nyangana in a place that was also called Nyangana.

King Libebe soon became reconciled with the missionaries, and the German fathers re-established Andara in 1913. The second attempt was done under leadership of father Joseph Gotthardt, who later became Archbishop of South West Africa.

== The mission today ==
Today Andara is the home of the Holy Family Parish, a Roman Catholic mission. In the 1960s, the Andara Catholic Hospital and a youth hostel were built. The hostel can house up to 130 people.

== Notable residents ==
- Joseph Diescho (born 1955), Namibian writer
