= Xander Skinner =

Namibian swimmer (born 1998)

Personal information
- Full name: Alexander Suelter Skinner
- Born: 18 March 1998 (age 28)
- Height: 195 cm (6 ft 5 in)
- Weight: 86 kg (190 lb)

Sport
- Sport: Swimming
- College team: McKendree Bearcats

Xander Skinner (born 18 March 1998) is a Namibian swimmer. He competed in the men's 100 metre freestyle event at the 2017 World Aquatics Championships. He is a graduate of SPIRE Institute and Academy, an Olympic training center in Geneva, Ohio.

At the 2022 South Africa National Swimming Championships, Skinner won the bronze medal in the 100 metre freestyle with a Namibian record time of 50.43 seconds.

== Major results ==
=== Individual ===
==== Long course ====
Year	Competition	Venue	Position	Event	Notes
2015	World Championships	Kazan, Russia	86th (h)	100 m freestyle	54.05
2015	World Championships	Kazan, Russia	75th (h)	200 m freestyle	2:01.01
2016	African Championships	Bloemfontein, South Africa	5th	50 m freestyle	23.58
2016	African Championships	Bloemfontein, South Africa	6th	100 m freestyle	51.54
2016	African Championships	Bloemfontein, South Africa	6th	100 m backstroke	1:01.51
2016	African Championships	Bloemfontein, South Africa	8th	50 m butterfly	26.87
2017	World Championships	Budapest, Hungary	56th (h)	100 m freestyle	51.00
2017	World Championships	Budapest, Hungary	60th (h)	200 m freestyle	1:54.99
2019	World Championships	Gwangju, South Korea	51st (h)	50 m freestyle	23.04 NR
2019	World Championships	Gwangju, South Korea	53rd (h)	100 m freestyle	50.44 NR
2019	African Games	Casablanca, Morocco	5th	50 m freestyle	23.09
2019	African Games	Casablanca, Morocco	5th	100 m freestyle	50.53
2019	African Games	Casablanca, Morocco	8th	200 m freestyle	1:55.10
2019	African Games	Casablanca, Morocco	9th (h)	100 m backstroke	59.28
2019	African Games	Casablanca, Morocco	18th (h)	50 m butterfly	26.10
2019	African Games	Casablanca, Morocco	21st (h)	100 m butterfly	59.09
2022	Commonwealth Games	(United Kingdom) Birmingham, Great Britain	15th (sf)	100 m freestyle	50.06 NR

==== Short course ====
Year	Competition	Venue	Position	Event	Notes
2016	World Championships	Windsor, Canada	57th (h)	50 m freestyle	23.05 NR
2016	World Championships	Windsor, Canada	64th (h)	100 m freestyle	49.77 NR
2016	World Championships	Windsor, Canada	80th (h)	200 m freestyle	1:53.47 NR
2016	World Championships	Windsor, Canada	75th (h)	50 m butterfly	25.97 NR
2021	World Championships	Abu Dhabi, United Arab Emirates	31st (h)	100 m freestyle	48.40 NR
2021	World Championships	Abu Dhabi, United Arab Emirates	35th (h)	200 m freestyle	1:47.66 NR

=== Relay ===
==== Long course ====
Year	Competition	Venue	Team	Position	Event	Notes
Representing Namibia
2016	African Championships	Bloemfontein, South Africa	Skinner / Roth / Schatz / Seidler	4th	4 × 100 m mixed medley	4:28.35 NR
