= Gciriku =

Traditional Kavango kingdom in Namibia

Gciriku is a traditional Kavango kingdom in what is today Namibia. Its people speak the Gciriku language.

The Gciriku (Rugciriku: vaGciriku) are one of the many ethnic groups in Namibia with a population of 50,529 as of 2023. The Gciriku mainly live in Ndiyona Constituency, Kavango East. A small number of Gciriku live in the southern part of Angola. Their language, Rumanyo (previously known under the name Rugciriku), is also a Bantu language, spoken in the Ndiyona constituency and in Rundu.

== Origins ==
The Gciriku are part of the Kavango migration group that originated in the parts of central Africa and the Great Lakes. In the early 1900s, the Gciriku became the first tribal group in the Kavango area to accept European missionaries. The Missionaries were given land and settled in an area now known as Nyangana (Kangweru) - Mamono.

== Royal rulers ==
Hompa Nyangana (1874-1924) was a fierce critic of all European influence, and particularly that of missionaries. Six Catholic mission journeys into the Kavango ended unsuccessful during his reign. Only after the seventh journey did missionary and later Archbishop Joseph Gotthardt manage to establish a mission station at Nyangana in 1910 and at Andara in 1913, using the severely weakened position of the King after the VaGciriku-Lishora Massacre of 1894.

== Language ==
The VaGciriku speak a language called Rugciriku. The language is also part of the school curriculum and the subject is called Rumanyo. Most people refer to the language as Rugciriku rwaMuduva (Muduva's Rugciriku). The language has a few clicking but it is not similar to the San language.

=== Rugciriku phrases ===
- Muntu mudona - A human is evil.
- Washa tuka oko ghuna kutunda, tuka oko ghuna kuyenda - Always be humble.
