= Ronan Wantenaar =

Namibian swimmer (born 2001)

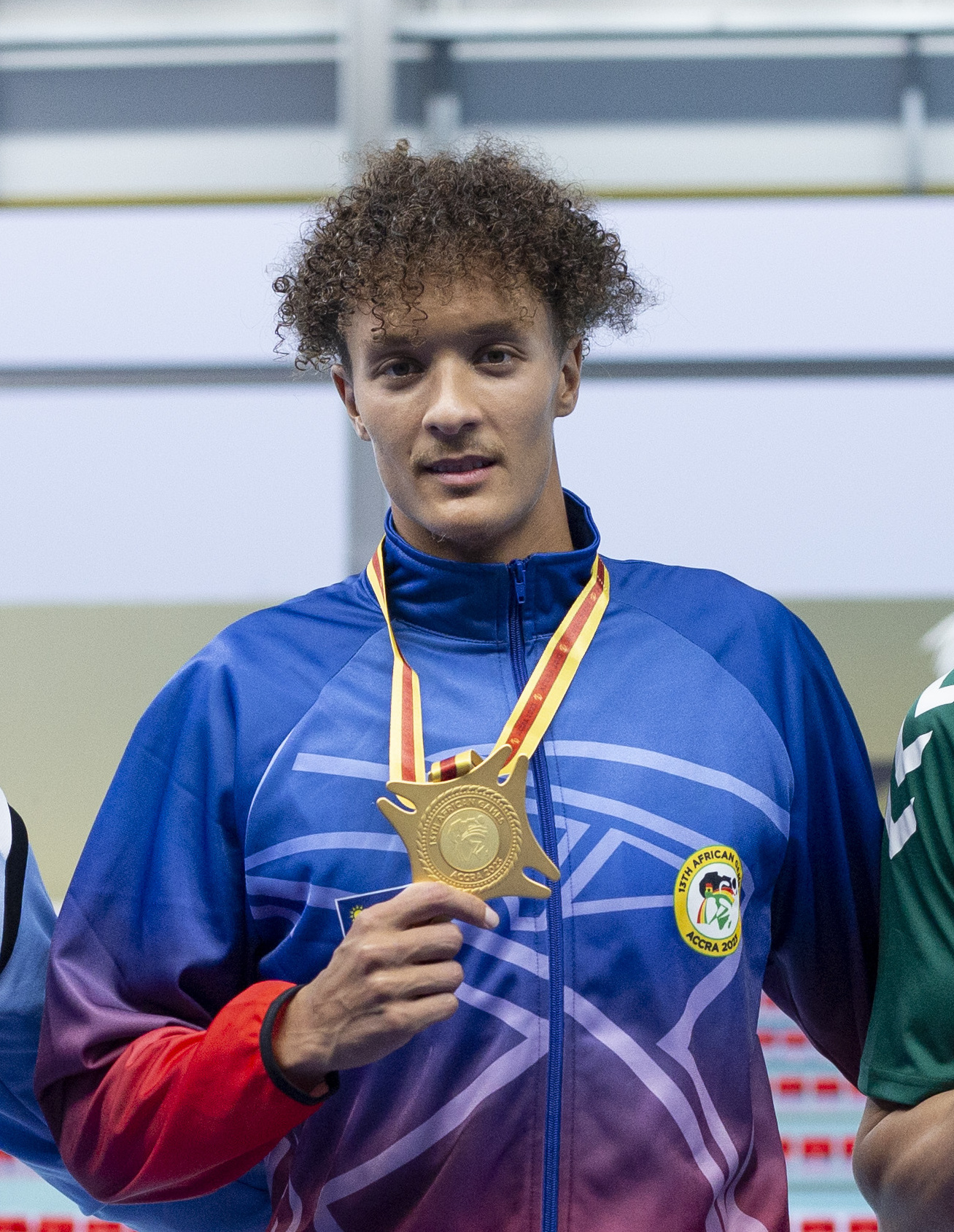
- Wantenaar at the 2023 African Games

Personal information
- Full name: Ronan Zuberg Wantenaar
- Nationality: Namibian
- Born: 10 February 2001 (age 25)

Sport
- Sport: Swimming
Medal record
Men's swimming
Representing Namibia
African Games
Gold medal – first place	2023 Accra	100 m breaststroke
Silver medal – second place	2023 Accra	200 m breaststroke
African Championships
Bronze medal – third place	2021 Accra	50 m breaststroke

Ronan Zuberg Wantenaar (born 10 February 2001) is a Namibian swimmer. He competed in the men's 50 metre breaststroke event at the 2017 World Aquatics Championships. In 2019, he represented Namibia at the 2019 World Aquatics Championships held in Gwangju, South Korea.

In May 2025, he broke his own 200m breaststroke record.
