= Phillip Seidler =

Namibian swimmer

Phillip Seidler OLY
Personal information
- Nationality: Namibian
- Born: 25 March 1998 (age 28) Windhoek, Namibia

Sport
- Sport: Swimming
- Event: Open water swimming

Phillip Seidler OLY (born 25 March 1998) is a Namibian swimmer.

== Career ==
Seidler competed in the men's 5 km event at the 2017 World Aquatics Championships in Budapest finishing 42nd. Seidler competed in the men's 10 km event at the 2019 World Aquatics Championships in Gwangju finishing 32nd. Seidler won the 10 km bronze medal at the 2021 South African Open Water Swimming Olympic Trials in March 2021. That result made him eligible for the FINA Marathon Swim Qualifier 2021 through which he qualified to compete at the Swimming at the 2020 Summer Olympics – Men's marathon 10 kilometre.

== Personal life ==
Seidler has been coached by his mother since he was 12 when his previous coach, June Owen-Smith, retired. Seidler runs an open water workshop in Namibia aiming to help unconfident or new swimmers with ocean swimming. His partner Amica De Jager has represented South Africa at marathon swimming.
