= Kavango people =

Bantu ethnic group of Namibia

The Kavango people, also known as the vaKavango or haKavango, are a Bantu ethnic group that resides on the Namibian side of the Namibian–Angolan border along the Kavango River. They are mainly riverine living people, but about 20% reside in the dry inland. Their livelihood is based on fishery, livestock-keeping and cropping (mainly pearl millet). The Kavango Region of Namibia is named after the people.

In traditional politics they are divided into five kingdoms (Kwangali, Mbunza, Shambyu, Gciriku and Mbukushu), each headed by a hompa or fumu, both meaning "king". Traditional law is still in use and legitimized by the Namibian constitution. The Kavango people are matrilinear. The most common language spoken is RuKwangali (in Kwangali and Mbunza territory); also spoken are Shambyu, Gciriku, and Mbukushu in the corresponding territories. Their religion is mainly Christian although traditional elements still have a place. During the harvest season in April the vakwangali people eat (mafumpura) a tuber like plant which is dug from the soil when it starts to crack. Their kitchens are built outside houses which they call (masuga) the roof of this kitchen is mainly thatch. Their staple food is pearl millet porridge. Pearl millet is also used by them to make a fermented drink.

== The extended family concept ==
Ekoro is a very important social relation in kinship systems of Kavango. It may be roughly referred to as an extended family, but it is more than that. It is a social relation dominantly rooted in clan and it is not necessarily determined by blood connections. The clans are ranked according to seniority, and whoever belongs to a junior clan (irrespective of age) is deemed young by those in the senior clan. There is a command of respect and high level of obedience towards the senior clan. Other people can also become clan members by seeking allegiance due to various unifying circumstances such as floods or war.
