= Flag of Namibia =

Republic of Namibia
- Use: National flag and ensign
- Proportion: 2:3
- Adopted: 21 March 1990; 36 years ago
- Design: A white-edged red diagonal band radiating from the lower hoist-side corner. The upper triangle is blue, charged with a gold sun with 12 triangular rays and the lower triangle is green.
- Designed by: Theo Jankowski; Don Stevenson; Ortrud Clay
- Use: Naval jack
- Design: A white field with the national flag in the canton.

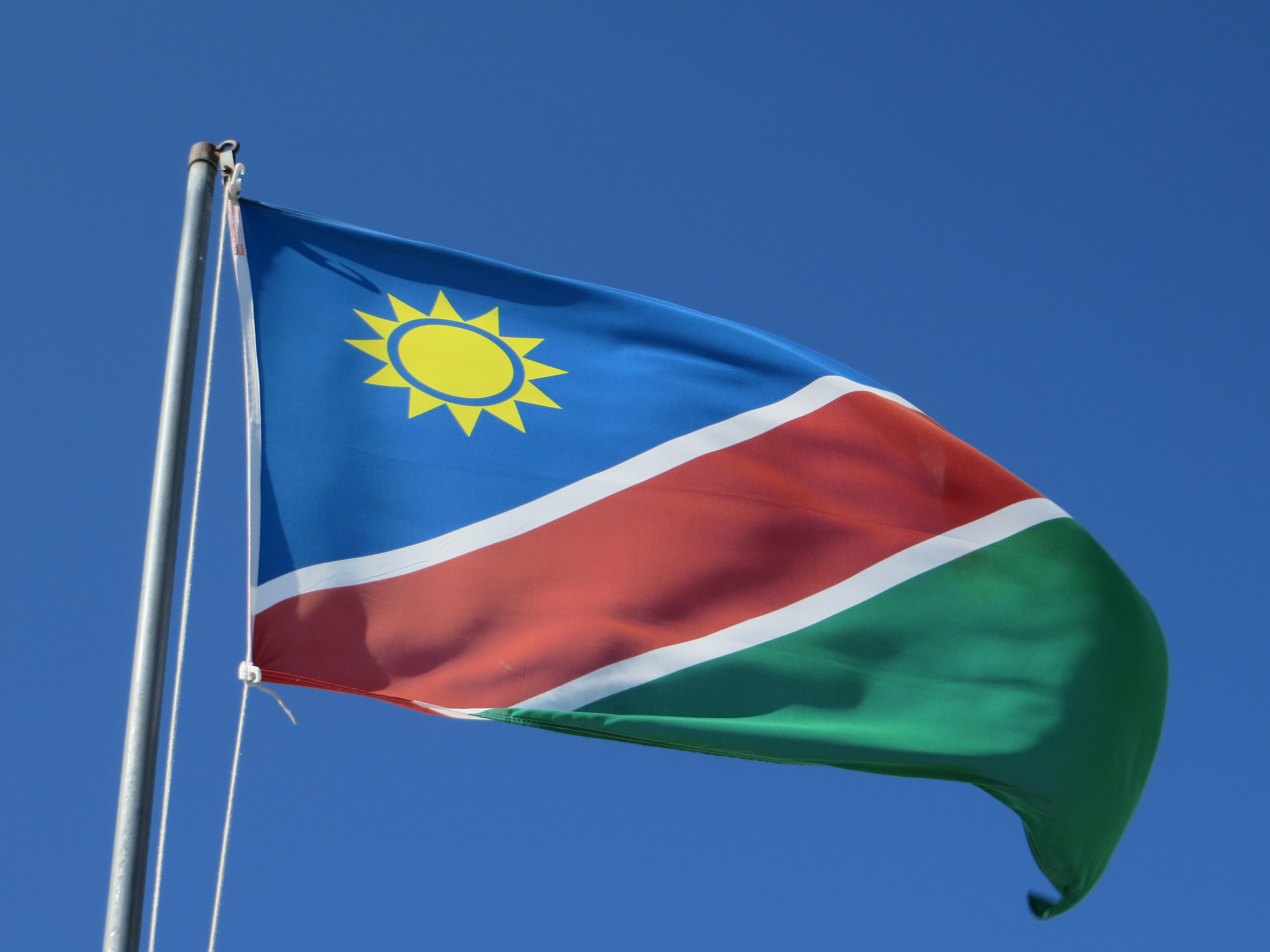
Namibian flag

The flag of Namibia consists of a red bend sinister fimbriated white, separating a blue upper triangle charged with a twelve-rayed yellow sun from a green lower triangle.

The flag was adopted on 21 March 1990 upon independence from South Africa. During apartheid rule, it used the South African orange-white-blue tricolor.

== Design ==
The National Symbols Sub-Committee received 870 entries for the national flag. Six designs were short-listed; this was reduced to three, those of three Namibians – Theo Jankowski of Rehoboth, Don Stevenson of Windhoek and Ortrud Clay of Lüderitz. These three designs were combined to form the Namibia national flag, adopted unanimously on 2 February 1990 by the Constituent Assembly. The three designers were publicly acknowledged by judge Hans Berker, the chairman of the subcommittee, at the unveiling ceremony on 9 March 1990.

However, two other claims were made – South African Frederick Brownell claimed that he had designed the flag in his role as South African State Herald. The other claimant was Briton Roy Allen, who claimed that the flag design was the result of a competition run by Hannes Smith of the Windhoek Observer, and that he had won.

It is one of the few national flags incorporating a diagonal line, with other examples including the DR Congo, Tanzania, Trinidad and Tobago, and Brunei.

=== Colours ===
The colours of the Namibian flag are described in the Government Gazette. This document also details the construction of the Presidential flag. The tone or specific shade for white has not been specified.

Colour model	Blue	Yellow gold	Green	Red	White
Pantone	294 C	116 C	347 C	186 C	White
Coates SP	5 809	1 802	65	35
RGB	0, 47, 108	255, 205, 0	0, 154, 68	200, 16, 46	255, 255, 255

=== Construction sheet ===
Namibian Flag construction sheet

== Symbolism ==
The chairman explained the symbolism of the flag's colours as follows:

- Red – represents Namibia's most important resource, its people. It refers to their heroism and their determination to build a future of equal opportunity for all.
- White – represents peace, unity, tranquility, and harmony.
- Green – symbolises vegetation and agricultural resources.
- Blue – represents the clear Namibian sky and the Atlantic Ocean, the country's precious water resources and rain.
- Golden-yellow sun – life and energy. The golden-yellow colour represents wealth of the country.
- The twelve rays of the sun – represents the twelve ethnicities of Namibia, which make up most of the Namibian population, which are divided into four main groups of three.

== Description ==
The flag has a white-edged red diagonal band radiating diagonally from the lower hoist-side corner. The upper triangle is blue with a gold sun with 12 triangular rays and the lower triangle is green.

Blazon: Per bend sinister Azure and Vert, a bend sinister Gules fimbriated Argent and in dexter chief a Sun with twelve straight rays Or charged with an annulet Azure.

== Other flags ==
Presidential Standard

Police Flag

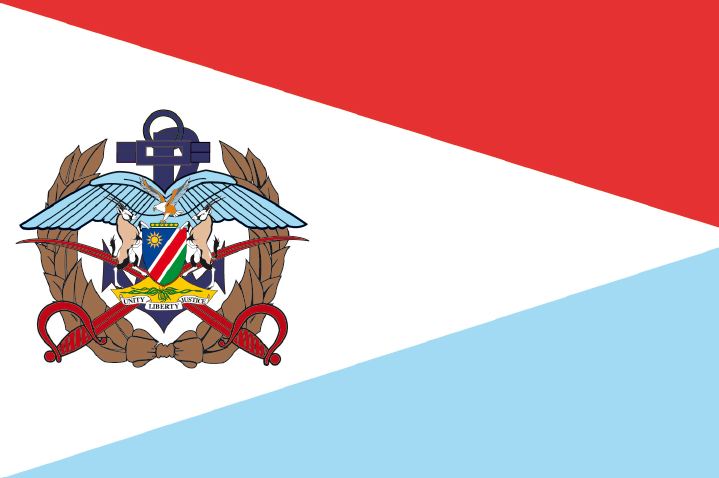
NDF Flag

Army Flag

Navy Flag

Air Force Flag

== Historical flags ==
Flag of the German Empire

Flag of the Reich Colonial Office, used in German South-West Africa from 24 April 1884 to 9 July 1915.

Proposed flag of German South-West Africa.

Flag of South West Africa between 1915 and 28 June 1919.

Merchant flag of South West Africa from 1915 to 1928.

The dark version of the flag of South West Africa from 1928 until 1990 under Mandates and Trusteeships by South Africa.

The bright version of the flag of South West Africa from 1928 until 1990 under Mandates and Trusteeships by South Africa.

Flag of SWAPO used at the United Nations between 1976 and 21 March 1990.

=== Flags of bantustans in South West Africa ===
Some of the bantustans established by South Africa during its period of administering South West Africa had adopted their own distinctive flags whilst others used the flag of South Africa.

Bushmanland

Damaraland

East Caprivi

Hereroland

Kaokoland (dark version)

Kaokoland (bright version)

Kavangoland

Namaland

Ovamboland

Rehoboth (Basterland)

Tswanaland (dark version)

Tswanaland (bright version)

== See also ==
- Flag of the Democratic Republic of the Congo — with a similar diagonal stripe
- Blue Sky with a White Sun, with a similar twelve-rayed sun
