= Caprivi treason trial =

Trial in Namibia

The Caprivi treason trial is a trial in which the Government of Namibia indicted 132 people for allegedly participating in the Caprivi conflict on the side of the Caprivi Liberation Army during a period between 1992 and 2002. They were charged with high treason, murder, sedition, and many other offences, altogether 278 counts of criminal conduct.

The trial is the longest and largest in the history of Namibia. While it started in 2003, the court case lasted more than 16 years, with High Court judgement being delivered in December 2015, and a Supreme Court challenge being launched in 2016 and still verdict pending.

According to The Namibian newspaper, the High Court judgement sentenced "30 men convicted of high treason, nine counts of murder and 90 charges of attempted murder". Among those initially tried, the High Court ruling acquitted 79 of the accused. Meanwhile, 22 others died in custody during the 16-year period between arrests and High Court judgement. Some of the alleged leaders of the sedition attempt were in exile at the time the Caprivi conflict peaked and have not been brought to court.

== Background ==
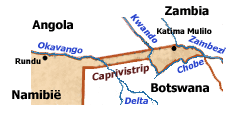
Caprivi Strip in north-eastern Namibia

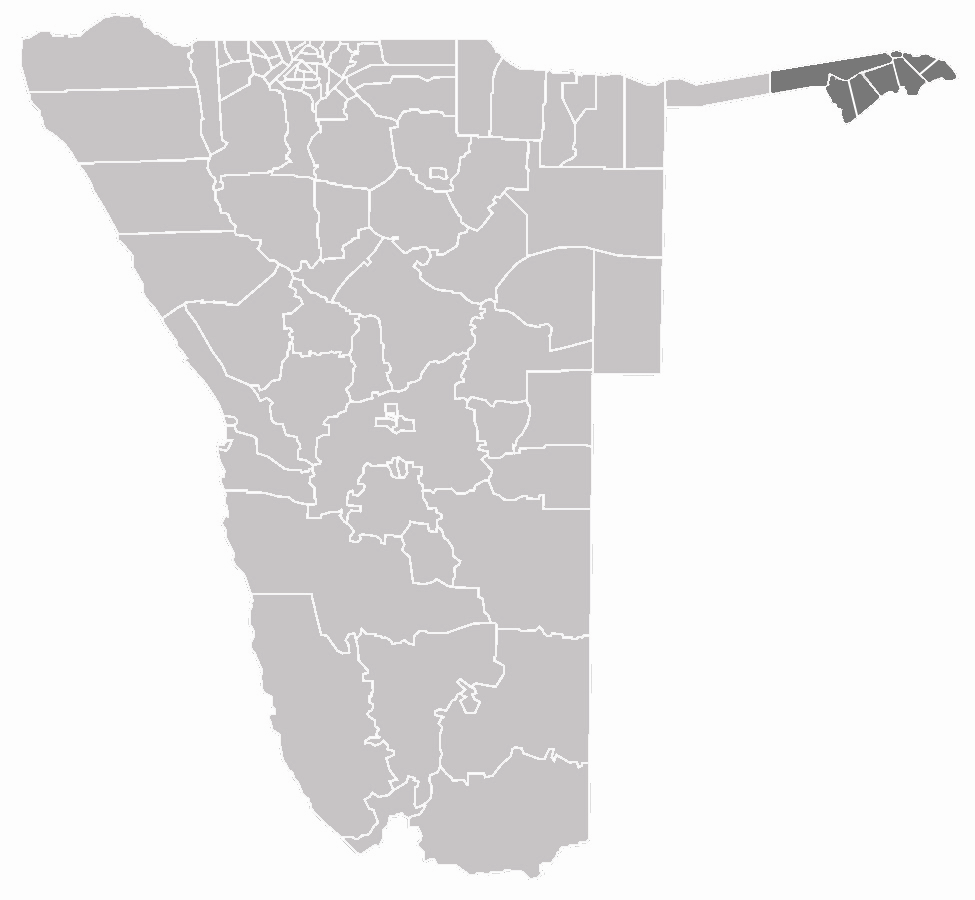
Location of the Zambezi Region on the Namibia map

The Caprivi Strip is a remnant of the Berlin Conference of 1884, at which the European powers divided sub-Saharan Africa amongst themselves, indifferent to its ethnology and often with inadequate knowledge of its geography. After the conference, European governments learned more about the geography of the interior and negotiated changes to boundaries agreed upon in Berlin. In 1890, German diplomat Leo von Caprivi sought to gain access to the Zambezi River for the German colony of South West Africa, to give Germany an interior route to Africa's East Coast, where the German colony Tanganyika was located. In the Heligoland-Zanzibar Treaty, Germany gave up its interest in Zanzibar in return for the island of Heligoland in the North Sea and the Caprivi Strip. The Zambezi proved to be unnavigable, but the Strip remained, even as South West Africa became Namibia.

On 2 August 1999, members of the Caprivi Liberation Army (CLA) launched an armed attack on government forces and buildings in the regional capital of Katima Mulilo in the Zambezi Region of north eastern Namibia. The same evening, president Sam Nujoma declared a state of emergency in the Caprivi province. Members of the Namibia Defence Force (NDF, Namibia's national army) and the Special Field Force (SFF, the paramilitary police unit) were deployed and repelled the attack.

11 people were killed during the attacks, among them 6 members of the security forces. 300 suspected rebel fighters and civilian sympathisers were detained, 132 of which were later charged.

== Charges and indicted people ==
Many of the arrested people are from the Mafwe tribe, including the majority of its traditional leadership. The Namibian government has in the meantime recognised other traditional leaders who are perceived to be mere puppets of the ruling SWAPO party.

Among the suspected leading figures detained and charged are:

- John Samboma, allegedly the commander of the Caprivi Liberation Army,
- Geoffrey Mwilima, former member of Namibia's National Assembly,
- Aggrey Makendano
- Thaddeus Ndala
- Osbert Likanyi
- Charles Mushakwa
- Martin Tubaundule
- Andreas Mulupa
- Richard Misuha
- John Samati
- Oscar Muyuka Puteho

A number of Caprivi traditional leaders and politicians have been implicated but were in exile at the time of the attacks:

- Mishake Muyongo, former leader of the Democratic Turnhalle Alliance (DTA) and member of the National Assembly from 1990 to 1999, was granted asylum in Denmark
- John Mabuku, former Democratic Turnhalle Alliance National Council member and governor of Caprivi Region (today Zambezi Region), died in exile in Botswana in 2008
- Boniface Bebi, former Mafwe chief, was granted asylum in Denmark

Botswana, Denmark and Canada have been granting asylum to people fleeing Namibia in the aftermath of the attack on Katima Mulilo. Only in 2010 Canada changed its standpoint and is now considering the CLA to be a terrorist organisation that has "attempted to usurp an elected government".

== Judges of the trial ==
- Elton Hoff, judge at the High Court at Grootfontein, heard the first leg of the trial and again took over after the death of Judge Manyarara in 2010.
- Johan Strydom, Chief Justice in the Supreme Court at Windhoek, ordered (Government of Namibia and Others vs. Mwilima and Others) the government to provide the treason suspects with legal representation in 2002
- John Manyarara, acting judge at the High Court in Windhoek, heard the second leg of the trial
- Judges of Appeal Maritz, Strydom, and Mutambanengwe in the Supreme Court decided (State vs. Malumo and 24 Others) that confessions from 25 accused were inadmissible before the High Court in Windhoek due to the occurrence of "coercive actions" at the hands of Police or military to obtain the testimonies.
- Acting judge of the Windhoek High Court Philanda Christiaan ruled in 2017 that the continued prosecution of one of the accused, Rosco Matengu Makapa, was malicious on the part of the prosecutor-general, and that Makapa is to be compensated for his losses. The judgment is likely to be appealed in the Supreme Court.
- Marlene Tommasi, judge at the High Court in Oshakati, heard the third leg of the trial

== Structure of the trial ==
The Caprivi treason trial consists of 275, at one stage 278, charges of murder, sedition, and treason, applied to 132 people. After preliminary hearings, bail applications, legal representation applications and other technical wrestles, the first stage of the trial started on 27 October 2003 in the High Court at Grootfontein.

Thirteen of the alleged separatists were regarded as the main accused and charged with high treason. They were tried in a separate leg of the proceedings sometimes called the Second Caprivi treason trial. Sentencing and much of the court hearings took place in their absence because throughout the trial they had shouted political slogans and sung Caprivi liberation songs, leading repeatedly to their removal from the court room. In 2007 this second trial ended with ten of the accused convicted and sentenced to 30 or 32 years of jail each, depending on the length of their stay in custody, and the remaining two acquitted and set free on a technicality. The thirteenth accused had died in custody before the sentencing began.

The conviction of eight of the thirteen main accused was overthrown in the Supreme Court in 2013. They have to be retried in the High Court but are again in custody.

A number of secondary and tertiary trials have been split from the main proceedings, among them a number of counterclaims by the alleged secessionists of unlawful arrest, torture and manhandling, but also the claim that Namibian courts do not have jurisdiction over the Caprivi because the Caprivi Strip is not part of the Republic of Namibia. This claim was taken to the Supreme Court and dismissed in July 2004. It interrupted the first leg of the trial by 5 months. In June 2013 this Supreme Court ruling was vacated because Mutabanengwe, one of the Supreme Court judges in 2004, had also served as chairman of the Advisory Board that reviewed how people were arrested while the Caprivi Region was under a state of emergency on 2 August 1999.

Another claim brought forward by the 13 main accused was one of unlawful arrest—the 13 main accused were found to be unlawfully abducted abroad—was at first successful when judge Hoff ruled in February 2004 that they were indeed "irregularly before the court". The 13 were, however, rearrested for treason 2 days after the court ruling, and sentenced the same year.

One accused, Albius Moto Liseli, handed himself over to the authorities in 2009. He was charged with high treason in 2010 and tried separately. The six years of proceedings against Liseli are called the Third Caprivi treason trial. Liseli was convicted and sentenced to 10 years in jail in 2017.

All other people charged in this trial are essentially co-accused of these thirteen, charged with lesser offences. They all pleaded "not guilty" to all charges laid out to them. In February 2013, 43 accused were acquitted on all charges and set free when Judge Hoff found that the prosecution's evidence did not support any of the charges they were accused of. The majority of these 43 had been in custody since 1999. The trial of the remaining people has not been concluded yet.

In 2009 alone, 127 civil suits emerging from the alleged mistreatment of the treason detainees were heard. While some of these counterclaims have been dismissed, a large number has been settled out of court. In 2015 Rodwell Kasika Mukendwa, one of the main accused, sued the government and several officials, saying that he had been wrongfully arrested in 1999 and wrongfully detained until 2012, when he was acquitted.

In 2015, High Court Judge Elton Hoff presented his ruling and found 30 of the accused guilty of high treason, murder and attempted murder.

== Delay of the trial ==
The Caprivi Treason Trial has been delayed by a number of factors, most prominently by its sheer size and the accompanying paper trail. Already in 2007, the trial transcripts amounted to more than 18,000 type-written pages, and 230 full days had been spent in court. This makes it by far the longest and largest trial in the history of Namibia, frequently swallowing around half of all legal assistance funds budgeted by the Namibian Ministry of Justice.

Further delays of the court proceedings were caused by:

- Withdrawal of defence counsels in 2004 after some of the accused questioned the jurisdiction of Namibian courts over Caprivi territory
- Car accident of the prosecution team on their way to the court hearings in 2005 which left one prosecutor dead and two prosecutors-general in critical condition. This and other car accidents led to a transfer of court hearings to Windhoek Central Prison, where part of the complex was restructured into a special court.
- Quarrels over salary issues between local and foreign lawyers
- The September 2012 suicide of Abraham Maasdorp, commanding officer of the High Treason Investigation Unit of NamPol, is also suspected to delay the trial.

Supreme Court judge Johan Strydom already stated in 2002 that the case "has all the makings of a logistical and organisational nightmare for both the prosecution and the defence and will no doubt run for a couple of years rather than months". On 7 February 2012 the State concluded the case for the prosecution. The court record for this trial by then consisted of circa 35,000 pages.

== Criticism ==
Both the massive delays of the trial and the treatment of the accused have been criticised by a host of local, regional, and international organisations.

Already in 2003, Amnesty International called on the Namibian Government to immediately resume the trial. As of 2012, 112 of the accused are still in prison, awaiting Judge Hoff's decision whether or not the State's case is strong enough to keep the accused in jail. Only four of the arrested have ever obtained bail. 19 of the prisoners awaiting trial have died in custody, some of them under questionable circumstances. Frequent reports of maltreatment, torture, medical neglect and unsanitary conditions in the holding cells have been made. Various individuals and groups have called for the pardoning of the convicted, as well as for the release of the accused.

Another point of criticism has been the level of, even alleged, involvement in the sedition attempts of many of the detainees. Except John Samboma, the commander of the Caprivi Liberation Army, most of the alleged masterminds of the secession of the Caprivi are not among the group of people that have been arrested.

A sizeable fraction of the people imprisoned are not even thought to have participated in any violent action but might have been "arrested solely based on their actual or perceived non-violent support for the political opposition in the region, their ethnic identity or their membership of certain organisations". Amnesty International assumes they are actually prisoners of conscience and in 2009 requested them to be tried or released immediately.
