= Caprivi African National Union =

- Abbreviation: CANU
- President: Brendan Simbwaye
- Founders: Brendan Simbwaye, Mishake Muyongo, Boniface Bebi, George Mutwa
- Founded: 7 September 1962
- Dissolved: 1965
- Merger of: SWAPO (1964)
- Succeeded by: United Democratic Party (1985)
- Headquarters: Katima Mulilo, Caprivi strip, South West Africa

The Caprivi African National Union (CANU) was a Namibian political organization founded in 1962 by Brendan Simbwaye and Mishake Muyongo to advocate for the independence of the Caprivi strip, now the Zambezi Region. CANU emerged in response to the area's distinct colonial history, geopolitical isolation, and the imposition of apartheid policies by South Africa, which administered the territory at the time.

Primarily supported by members of the Mafwe and Masubia communities, CANU played a key role in regional resistance before merging with the South West Africa People's Organization (SWAPO) in 1964 to form a united front in the Namibian liberation struggle.

== History ==
The Caprivi strip, now the Zambezi Region of Namibia, was historically administered separately from the rest of the country due to its geographic isolation and colonial legacy. Originally acquired by Germany through the 1890 Heligoland-Zanzibar Treaty to provide access to the Zambezi River, the territory was later governed by South Africa under a League of Nations mandate after World War I. This isolation, combined with the imposition of apartheid policies, created a unique political environment in the region.

CANU emerged as a political platform advocating for the independence and self-determination of the Caprivi Strip. Although it had operated underground since 1958, the organisation was formally established in 1962 by Brendan Simbwaye and Mishake Muyongo. It drew strong support from the local Mafwe and Masubia communities, who resented the administrative neglect and racial discrimination imposed by the South African authorities. Several traditional leaders and chiefs, including the Mafwe royal establishment, supported CANU's cause, strengthening its local support base.

=== Merger with SWAPO and fallout ===
In 1964, CANU merged with the South West Africa People's Organization (SWAPO) in Dar es Salaam, Tanzania, to unite the national liberation struggle against South African colonialism. CANU's president, Brendan Simbwaye, was appointed vice president of SWAPO, although his influence was short-lived as he was detained by South African authorities in 1965 and mysteriously disappeared in 1972.

Following Simbwaye's arrest in 1965, Mishake Muyongo, who quickly rose to prominence within SWAPO, was appointed acting vice president of SWAPO. Over time, Muyongo grew increasingly critical of SWAPO's internal governance, with tensions heightened by ideological and ethnic differences, particularly during the "1975–76 crisis" and the Shipanga Rebellion. Between 1978 and 1980, he and other leaders began openly criticizing SWAPO president Sam Nujoma's decisions. They questioned the dominance of the Ovambo ethnic group within SWAPO, alleging discrimination against Caprivians. His outspoken views eventually led to his marginalization within the movement. He was briefly detained in Zambia alongside other dissidents and was ultimately expelled from SWAPO in 1980. The fallout split former CANU members; some remained loyal to SWAPO and continued to fight for Namibian independence, while others left SWAPO and followed Muyongo.

=== Later years and the Caprivi conflict ===
After his expulsion from SWAPO in 1980, Muyongo and several of his followers returned to Namibia and founded the United Democratic Party (UDP) as a successor of CANU. The UDP joined the umbrella alliance of the Democratic Turnhalle Alliance (DTA). Muyongo quickly rose through the DTA's ranks, becoming its vice president and later president. He was the alliance's presidential candidate in the 1994 general elections.

In 1994, the Caprivi Liberation Army (CLA) was formed by former CANU and UDP members with links to Muyongo. The CLA advocated for the secession of the Caprivi strip from Namibia, marking the beginning of what would become known as the Caprivi conflict. The movement reportedly received support from international groups, including UNITA in Angola and the Barotse Patriotic Front in Zambia. On 2 August 1999, the CLA launched coordinated attacks on key government installations in Katima Mulilo, including a police station, military base, and border post, in an attempt to declare an independent Caprivi state. The Namibian government responded by declaring a state of emergency and launching a military crackdown, arresting over 130 individuals suspected of involvement in the rebellion. These arrests led to the Caprivi treason trial with proceedings stretching over a decade and culminating in several acquittals by 2012. Muyongo and several other UDP leaders fled into exile, first to Botswana and later to Denmark, where they were granted political asylum. Namibia's efforts to have them extradited were ultimately unsuccessful.

== Legacy ==
While CANU ceased to exist as an independent entity following its merger with SWAPO in 1964, its legacy endured through the significant contributions of its former members to Namibia's liberation. Mishake Muyongo took some former members with him when he was expelled from SWAPO in 1980. However, the majority of ex-CANU members remained loyal to SWAPO and played vital roles in the movement's leadership and in Namibia's post-independence governance.

- Brendan Simbwaye, co-founder of CANU and later SWAPO's vice president, became a symbol of resistance. His legacy is honored through various commemorations, including the Brendan Simbwaye Square in Windhoek, a primary school in Katima Mulilo, and the NS Brendan Simbwaye, a Namibian Navy patrol vessel bearing his name.
- Greenwell Matongo, a respected combatant of the People's Liberation Army of Namibia (PLAN), is commemorated with neighborhoods named after him in Windhoek and Katima Mulilo.
- Richard Kabajani, another prominent figure, served as a PLAN commander, played a key role in opening the eastern front, and held multiple ministerial positions post-independence. Following his death in 2007, Kabajani was accorded a state funeral and became the first person from the Zambezi Region to be buried at Heroes' Acre in Windhoek with full military honors.
- Lt. Gen. John Mutwa rose through the PLAN ranks during the liberation struggle and served as the Chief of the Namibian Defence Force from 2013 to 2020. He was declared a national hero of Namibia and awarded a state funeral by President Hage Geingob.

== See also ==
- United Democratic Party
- Caprivi Liberation Army
- Caprivi Conflict
- South West Africa People's Organization
