= Brendan Simbwaye =

Namabian anti-apartheid activist

Vice President of SWAPO
- In office 1964–1970
- Preceded by: Louis Nelengani
- Succeeded by: Mishake Muyongo

President of CANU
- In office 1962–1994

Personal details
- Born: 1934 Ndangamwa, Caprivi, South West Africa
- Died: possibly 1972 after he disappeared from Caprivi (aged 47–48)
- Party: CANU, SWAPO
- Occupation: Politician

Brendan Kongongolo Simbwaye (1934–1972?) was a Namibian anti-apartheid activist who was president of the Caprivi African National Union (CANU). Simbwaye was a key figure in the movement to end South African colonial rule in the Caprivi strip. His activism and leadership made him a target of the South African regime, which sought to suppress the growing resistance in the region. In 1964, after a merger between CANU and SWAPO, Simbwaye was appointed vice-president of SWAPO, solidifying his position in the broader nationalist movement for the Namibian war of independence.

Simbwaye's life and political career was abruptly cut short in 1972 when he disappeared under unclear circumstances. Despite numerous reports and investigations, his fate remains a subject of speculation, with some alleging that he was killed by South African security forces.

== Early life ==
Brendan Simbwaye was born in 1934 at Ndangamwa, a village near Malindi in the eastern part of Caprivi. He was educated at the Holy Family Mission at Katima Mulilo where he completed Standard 6 Upper in 1955. He furthered his education at Lukulu Teacher Training College in Zambia where he completed a two-year primary education course in 1957. He did Standard 8 by correspondence through Lyceum College, South Africa. Simbwaye was employed as a teacher at the Holy Family Mission in 1957. Simbwaye was a Catholic and deeply religious, he was married to a trained nurse.

== Political career ==
Growing dissatisfaction with South African colonial rule in Caprivi, especially among the local tribes, sparked early underground resistance led by young activists such as Simbwaye, along with members of the Mafwe and Masubia communities. In September 1962, Simbwaye co-founded the Caprivi African National Union (CANU) alongside Mishake Muyongo, with the aim of ending South Africa's control over the Caprivi strip.

In 1963, Simbwaye resigned from his teaching position to dedicate himself fully to the activities of CANU. The authorities began to closely monitor Simbwaye's activities at the end of 1963 when he left for Lusaka, Zambia, to seek support from the United Nations, which was then involved in Zambia's transition to independence. He also aimed to build ties with the United National Independence Party (UNIP). It is reported that UNIP assisted in printing CANU's first membership cards and drafting its constitution. While in Zambia, he made contact with leaders of the South West Africa People's Organisation (SWAPO) to pave the way for a future merger between CANU and SWAPO.

Simbwaye returned to Caprivi at the end of March 1964 and was arrested in July, just as he was about to address CANU's first public meeting at a village near Katima Mulilo. He was charged with leaving the country illegally and for organizing a public meeting without permission from the authorities. He was sentenced to a three-month jail term at the Windhoek Central Prison. After his release, he was banned from re-entering Caprivi without approval from the Minister responsible for Bantu Administration and Development. He was then restricted—first to Warmbad, and later to Khorixas, where he was kept in a small prison. Following his arrest, CANU regrouped in Zambia under the leadership of Muyongo, who finalized the merger of CANU into SWAPO in November 1964. Although in detention, Simbwaye was appointed SWAPO’s vice president.

In 1970, Simbwaye was charged with terrorist activities in a secret trial in Pretoria. He was later allowed to return to Caprivi, where he disappeared under unclear circumstances in 1972. Allegedly, he was killed by South African security forces at Opuwo.

== Legacy ==
A number of entities have been named in his honour:

- Brendan Simbwaye Square Building in Windhoek
- Brendan Simbwaye Complex in Katima Mulilo opposite Total Service Station
- Brendan Simbwaye Primary School in Katima Mulilo
- NS Brendan Simbwaye, a Namibian Navy patrol boat
- The D3508 in the Kabbe North constituency, linking Luhonono to Isize and Namalubi, was renamed Brendan Simbwaye Road in 2021.

== See also ==
- List of people who disappeared
