= The Caprivi Vision =

Newspaper in Namibia

- Type: Weekly newspaper
- Founder: Risco Mashete Lumamezi
- Language: English
- Headquarters: Windhoek
- Website: caprivivision.com

The Caprivi Vision is a weekly published community newspaper in Namibia with content in English and Lozi. It is sold in the Caprivi Strip now Zambezi Region, Northern Regions of Namibia, in the capital Windhoek and other countries of the Southern Africa such as Botswana and Zambia. The Caprivi Vision was founded by Risco Mashete Lumamezi on 21 August 2000 as a student of the Polytechnic of Namibia, and its first edition was sold in Katima Mulilo on 30 April 2002.

In Namibia, most newspapers are Windhoek based, whereas rural dwellers in the remote areas do not have a platform to voice their concerns in a language they understand. Only few indigenous language newspapers currently exist in the country.

The Caprivi Vision stirred up controversy in its edition of 18–29 February 2008 by providing a platform for the exiled Mishake Muyongo, leader of the banned United Democratic Party and alleged mastermind behind the attacks that led to the Caprivi Conflict, to further advocate the secession of the Caprivi Strip. In particular his 2008 New Year's message triggered a sharp response from the Ministry of Information and Broadcasting, both against Muyongo and the editor of the paper. The Namibian Society for Human Rights (NSHR) in turn defended the editor, stating that press freedom extends to opinion pieces favouring secession.
