= Canada–Namibia relations =

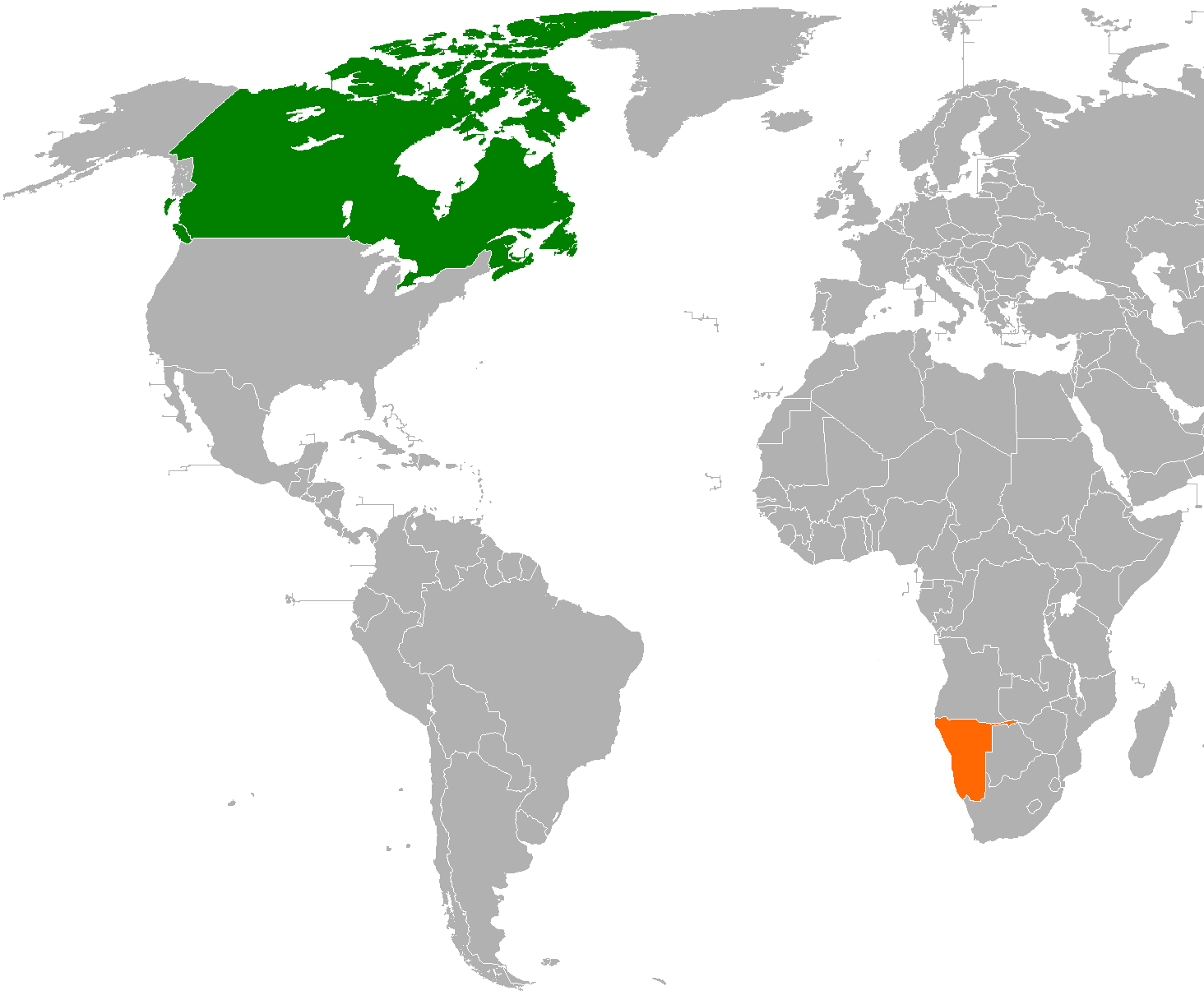

- Canada: Namibia

Bilateral relations between Canada and Namibia began in 1990. Both countries are members of the Commonwealth of Nations and the United Nations. Neither country has a resident ambassador.

== Historical relations ==
Canada's relationship with Namibia began in 1977 when Canada joined the Western Contact Group, a joint diplomatic effort of France, United Kingdom, United States, Canada and West Germany to bring an internationally acceptable transition to independence for Namibia. In 1990, diplomatic relations between both nations were established following Namibia's independence.

== Political relations ==
In September 2018, Namibian President Hage Geingob paid a visit to Ottawa and met with Prime Minister Justin Trudeau. Both leaders discussed shared priorities including the promotion of women’s empowerment. In 2025, Prime Minister Mark Carney met with President Netumbo Nandi-Ndaitwah on the margins of the 80th Session of the United Nations General Assembly where they discussed deepening ties between both nations and building new trade opportunities to attract investment.

== Cultural relations ==
Canada is one of the main destinations for Namibian refugees. Together with Botswana and Denmark, Canada has been granting asylum to people fleeing Namibia in the aftermath of the Caprivi conflict, and particularly the Caprivi treason trial that followed in which the Namibian government was accused of human rights violations. Only in 2010 Canada has changed its standpoint and is now considering the Caprivi Liberation Army to be a terrorist organisation that has "attempted to usurp an elected government". Nonetheless, Canada received a steady inflow of Namibian immigrants who seek economic betterment under the pretense of humiliation and harassment in Namibia. In 2011 more than 1,000 Namibians entered Canada. Three quarters of them applied for refugee status, but only a few were successful.

== Economic relations ==
In 2023, bilateral trade between Canada and Namibia totaled $171.3 million. Canadian companies are significantly invested in the mining industry of Namibia. In 2008, 99% of Canadian imports from Namibia, totaling over 246 million dollars, came in the form of uranium. In July 2010, Canadian-based company Dundee Precious Metals bought the metal smelter in Tsumeb, saving it from closure and maintaining around 200 jobs.

Africa Oil Corporation holds a 40% stake in Impact Oil and Gas, linked to Namibia’s Venus oil discovery. A final investment decision is expected in 2026, making Namibia an oil exporter by the 2030s.

== Diplomatic missions ==
- Canada is accredited to Namibia from its high commission in Pretoria, South Africa and maintains an honorary consulate in Windhoek.
- Namibia is accredited to Canada from its embassy in Washington, D.C., United States.
