= Mishake Muyongo =

Namibian politician currently living in exile in Denmark (born 1944)

Mishake Muyongo MP
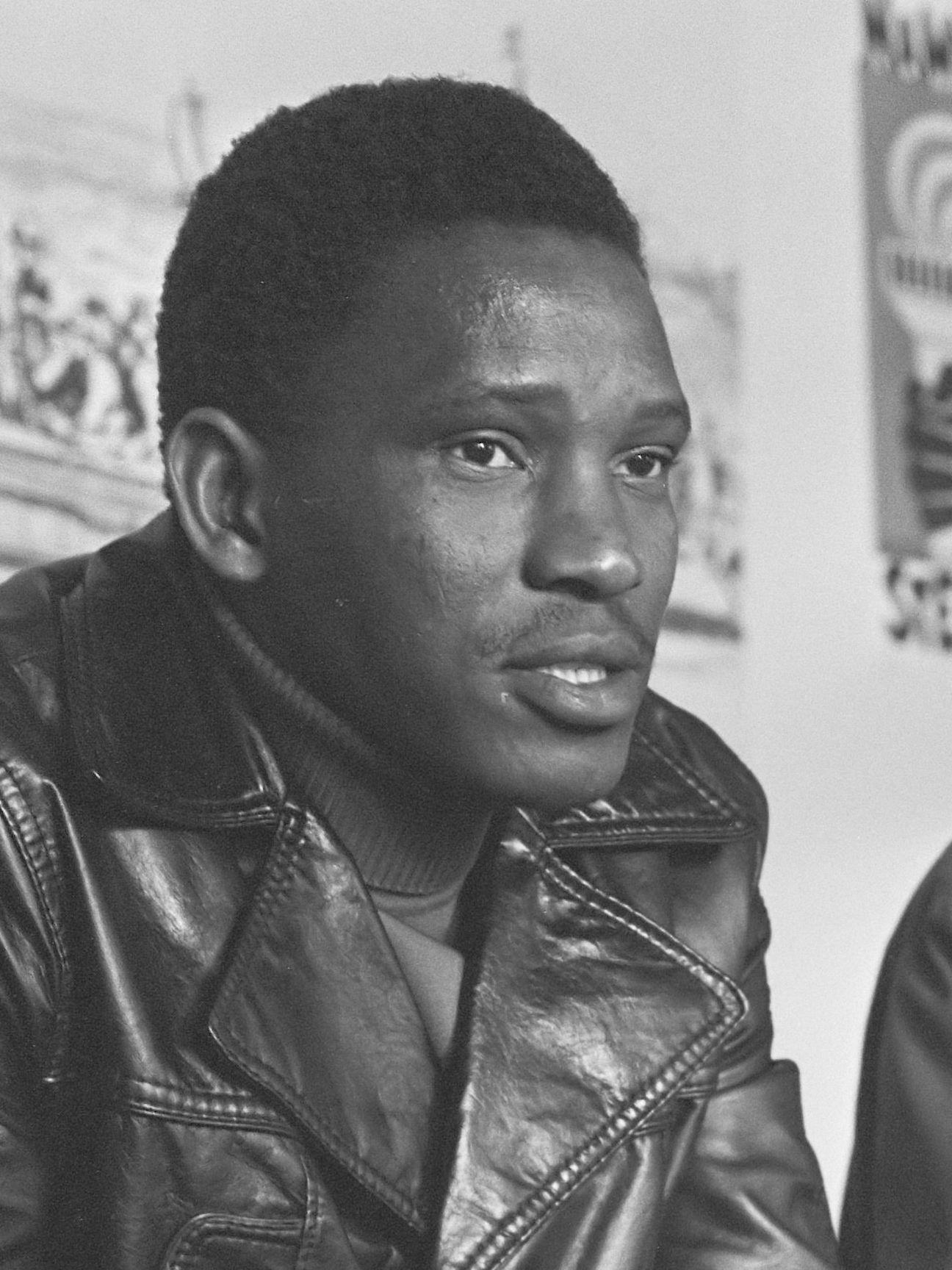
- Mishake Muyongo (1976)

President of Democratic Turnhalle Alliance
- In office 1990–1998
- Preceded by: Cornelius Ndjoba
- Succeeded by: Katuutire Kaura

Vice President of Democratic Turnhalle Alliance
- In office 1987–1990
- Preceded by: Ben Africa
- Succeeded by: Katuutire Kaura

President of United Democratic Party
- In office 1984–2006

Vice President of SWAPO
- In office 1970–1980

SWAPO Secretary for Education
- In office 1966–1970
- Succeeded by: Nahas Angula

Vice President of Caprivi African National Union
- In office 1962–1965

Personal details
- Born: 28 April 1944 (age 82) Linyanti, Caprivi, South West Africa
- Party: CANU; SWAPO; UDP; DTA
- Occupation: Politician

Albert Mishake Muyongo (born 28 April 1944) is a Namibian politician and former Member of Parliament, currently living in exile in Denmark. Muyongo has been a longstanding advocate for the independence of the Caprivi strip (now Zambezi region).

In 1962, Muyongo co-founded the Caprivi African National Union (CANU). That same year, he fled into exile in Dar es Salaam, Tanzania where he negotiated a merger of CANU with the South West Africa People's Organisation (SWAPO). As a result, he was appointed SWAPO representative to Zambia (1964–1965). He later served as SWAPO Secretary for Education (1966–1970), and in 1970, he was elected SWAPO vice president.

Muyongo was expelled from SWAPO in 1980 and returned to Namibia. He founded the United Democratic Party (UDP) in 1985 and joined the Democratic Turnhalle Alliance (DTA). Muyongo rose through the ranks of the DTA, becoming Vice President in 1987 and President in 1991. During Namibia's transition to independence, Muyongo was a member of the Constituent Assembly of Namibia (1989–1990) and subsequently served in the National Assembly from 1990 to 1999. He was the DTA presidential candidate in the 1994 general elections, finishing second to Sam Nujoma with 23.08% of the vote.

In 1994, Muyongo was linked to the formation of the Caprivi Liberation Army (CLA), a separatist rebel group advocating for the secession of the Caprivi strip. Tensions escalated into the Caprivi conflict, culminating in the declaration of a state of emergency in the region. After Muyongo expressed support for Caprivi secession in 1998, he was suspended from the DTA in August 1998 at an extraordinary meeting of the party's executive committee. Muyongo fled the country with Chief Boniface Bebi Mamili of the Lozi-allied Mafwe people. Other Caprivians, including the former governor of the Caprivi Region (today Zambezi Region), John Mabuku, fled to Botswana at the same time. Muyongo was replaced as DTA president by Katuutire Kaura, who called for Muyongo to be brought back and put on trial.

== Early life ==
Mishake Muyongo was born on 28 April 1944 in Linyanti, Caprivi strip, in the northeastern part of South West Africa, which was under South African apartheid rule at the time. He was born into the Mafwe royal family, an ethnic group native to the Caprivi strip, and was exposed to a traditional and royal upbringing. Muyongo received his early education at Roman Catholic mission schools in Katima Mulilo. He later continued his studies at Gokomere Mission School in Zimbabwe, graduating from high school in 1961. He attended a teacher's training college in South Africa and worked as a teacher in Katima Mulilo.

In the early 1960s, concerns grew among the chiefs of the broader Lozi ethnic community, including the Mafwe and the Masubia tribes regarding potential loss of their ancestral lands under South African administration. This led to discussions about the possibility of Caprivi self-determination. That same year, two traditional leaders from the Caprivi strip petitioned the United Nations, demanding freedom and independence for the region. Many young activists, including Muyongo, became involved in mass protests in Katima Mulilo, advocating for the region's self-determination and resisting South African control.

== Political career ==
In September 1962, Muyongo and Brendan Simbwaye co-founded the Caprivi African National Union (CANU), with the backing of traditional leaders from the Mafwe and Masubia tribes. Although CANU had operated as an underground movement since late 1958, it was formally established to pursue the independence of the Caprivi strip. Muyongo was appointed as vice president of CANU, while Simbwaye assumed the role of president, leading the movement's efforts to mobilize political support and international attention for Caprivi's self-determination.

In early 1964, Simbwaye left Katima Mulilo for Lusaka, Zambia, to seek support from the United Nations, which was actively involved in Zambia's transition to independence, and to establish stronger ties with the United National Independence Party (UNIP). During this trip, he also met with members of the SWAPO leadership, laying the groundwork for a merger between CANU and SWAPO. Upon his return to Katima Mulilo in March 1964, Simbwaye was questioned by the South African authorities for leaving the territory without permission and accused of inciting political unrest in Caprivi. CANU would later organized a public meeting, but shortly thereafter, South African security forces raided the CANU office in Katima Mulilo and arrested Simbwaye, who was subsequently detained.

Following Simbwaye's arrest in 1964, the political climate in Caprivi grew increasingly tense. A mass demonstration held in Katima Mulilo that year ended in bloodshed, prompting Muyongo and several members of the CANU leadership to flee into exile in Zambia. In November 1964, Muyongo, Sam Nujoma and Jacob Kuhangua negotiated and formalized the merger between CANU and the South West Africa People's Organisation (SWAPO). The negotiations culminated in a united front committed to liberating Namibia from South African rule. Following the merger, Simbwaye was appointed vice president of SWAPO in absentia, while Muyongo was assigned to serve as SWAPO's representative in Zambia in 1965, replacing Hifikepunye Pohamba. In addition to his diplomatic role, Muyongo also acted in the capacity of vice president in Simbwaye's absence.

In 1966, Muyongo was appointed as SWAPO's Secretary for Education. During this period, he played a significant role in the organization's education policies and efforts to maintain cohesion within the liberation struggle. In 1970, during the SWAPO Tanga Conference in Tanzania, Muyongo was elected as SWAPO's vice president. His political influence grew as he continued to organize and support efforts in Namibia's liberation struggle from the Scandinavian countries, with which he had established strong relationships. He was also involved in the crushing of the Shipanga Rebellion in 1976, a separatist movement within SWAPO led by Andreas Shipanga, that challenged the party's leadership. Muyongo's connections within the Zambian government were vital in quelling the rebellion, which ultimately strengthened his standing within SWAPO. Muyongo's political views began to diverge from those of Nujoma and other top leaders. In 1980, he was expelled from SWAPO due to political differences and accusations of being involved in factions that threatened the unity of the movement.

=== Post SWAPO and Return to Namibia ===
After his expulsion from SWAPO, Muyongo returned to Namibia, where he resurrected his political career. He re-established CANU as a new party, the United Democratic Party (UDP), and led it into the Democratic Turnhalle Alliance (DTA) in 1985. Muyongo rose quickly through the ranks and played a prominent role in DTA politics, becoming its vice president from 1987 to 1992, and later its president from 1992 to 1999. His leadership within the DTA was a crucial part of the party's role in the Namibian independence process.

Prior to independence, Muyongo was a member of the Constituent Assembly that helped draft the country's constitution and was a member of the National Assembly of Namibia after independence. He ran as a presidential candidate in the 1994 general elections and placed second behind Sam Nujoma, with 23.08% of the vote. a result that reinforced his political influence in Namibia. However, his association with the Caprivi region's separatist movements caused growing tension within the DTA, and in 1998, he was suspended from the party after rumors of his involvement in a planned secessionist uprising in the Caprivi strip.

=== Caprivi Secession and Exile ===
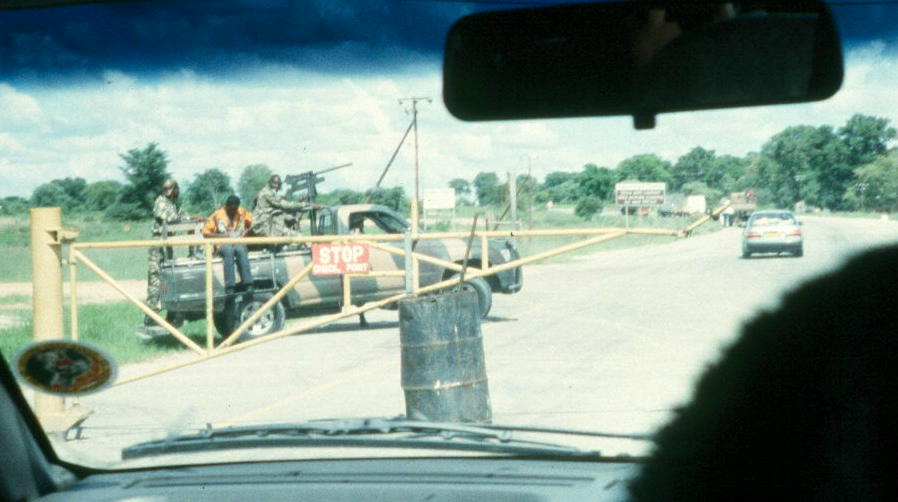
Namibian military escort through the Caprivi Strip.

After Namibia's independence, tensions arose concerning the political future of the Caprivi region. Many leaders from the Mafwe and Masubia ethnic groups, including Muyongo, felt that the region's interests were not adequately represented in the newly independent Namibia. The Caprivi strip has a complex history of territorial exchanges; it was acquired by Germany from Britain through the Heligoland-Zanzibar Treaty of 1890 to provide access to the Zambezi River. It later became part of South West Africa under South African mandate after World War I. This historical context contributed to the perception among some leaders that the Caprivi strip was not originally part of South West Africa and, therefore, should not be part of Namibia. Some sources suggest that during the 1964 merger of SWAPO and CANU, there was an understanding that the Caprivi region would be granted self-governance upon Namibia's independence. This sense of alienation contributed to a broader sentiment of secessionism in the region, which culminated in the Caprivi Liberation Army (CLA) uprising in 1998.

On 2 August 1999, the CLA attacked several government institutions in Katima Mulilo, including an army base, police station, a border post, a state-run radio station (of the Namibian Broadcasting Corporation) and the Katima Mulilo Airport. In the fighting that followed between the CLA and the Namibia Defense Force, 14 people were killed, including some civilians caught in the crossfire. A state of emergency was declared in the region leading to widespread arrests of suspected CLA supporters. Many Caprivians, including former Caprivi Region Governor John Mabuku, fled to Botswana during this time.

In the aftermath of the failed secessionist attempt, Muyongo fled to Denmark via Botswana with other leaders from the Caprivi region, including Chief Boniface Bebi Mamili. The Namibian government sought their extradition, but Muyongo and Bebi found asylum in Denmark and escaped the Caprivi treason trial in Namibia. Muyongo was eventually replaced as president of the DTA by Katuutire Kaura, who publicly called for his return and prosecution. Despite living in exile, Muyongo remained an outspoken critic of the Namibian government and consistently advocated for the rights and self-determination of the Caprivi people.
