= List of wars involving Namibia =

This is a list of wars involving Namibia.

Conflict	Combatant 1	Combatant 2	Result
Herero Wars (1904–1908)	Herero, Nama, and other Namibians	German Empire: German South West Africa German South West Africa	German victory: systematic extermination of native peoples
South West Africa campaign (1914–1915)	United Kingdom: South Africa; Portugal: Angola	Germany: South West Africa; South African Republic Oukwanyama	Allied victory: South West Africa annexed to the Union of South Africa
Namibian War of Independence (1966–1990)	SWAPO (PLAN); MPLA (FAPLA); Cuba; SWANU; ANC (MK); Zambia; Military advisers and pilots: Soviet Union; East Germany	South Africa: TGNU (1985–1989); Portugal (until 1974); UNITA (from 1975); FNLA (1975)	Military stalemate: Angolan Tripartite Accord, leading to: Withdrawal of South African forces from Namibia; withdrawal of Cuban forces from Angola; 1989 Namibian parliamentary elections; SWAPO government assuming power in Namibia; South West Africa gains independence from South Africa as the Republic of Namibia
Second Congo War (1998–2003)	Pro-government: DR Congo; Angola; Chad; Namibia; Zimbabwe; Sudan (alleged); Anti-Ugandan forces: LRA; ADF; UNRF II; FNI; Anti-Rwandan militias: FDLR; (Rwanda) ALiR; Interahamwe; RDR; Mai-Mai; Other Hutu-aligned forces; Anti-Burundi militias: CNDD-FDD; FROLINA; Support: Central African Republic; Libya; South Africa; Tanzania; Zambia	Rwandan-aligned militias: RCD; RCD-Goma; Banyamulenge; Ugandan-aligned militias: MLC; Forces for Renewal; UPC; Other Tutsi-aligned forces; Anti-Angolan forces: UNITA; Foreign state actors: Uganda; Rwanda; Burundi; Libya (alleged; 2002); Support: United Kingdom; United States	Military stalemate: Assassination of Laurent-Désiré Kabila; Sun City Agreement; Creation of a unified, multi-party government in DR Congo, with Joseph Kabila as president; Pretoria Accord; Rwandan withdrawal from DR Congo in exchange for commitment towards the disarmament of Hutu militias.; The Transitional Government of the Democratic Republic of the Congo is established, deployment of MONUC.; End of the Angolan Civil War.; Continuation of the Ituri conflict.; Start of the Kivu conflict.
Caprivi conflict (1998–2002)	Namibia	Caprivi Liberation Army	Namibian government victory
