= East Caprivi =

Bantustan in South West Africa (1972–1989)

Coordinates: 17°46′10″S 24°12′49″E

East Caprivi Oos-Caprivi Ostcaprivi
- 1972–1989
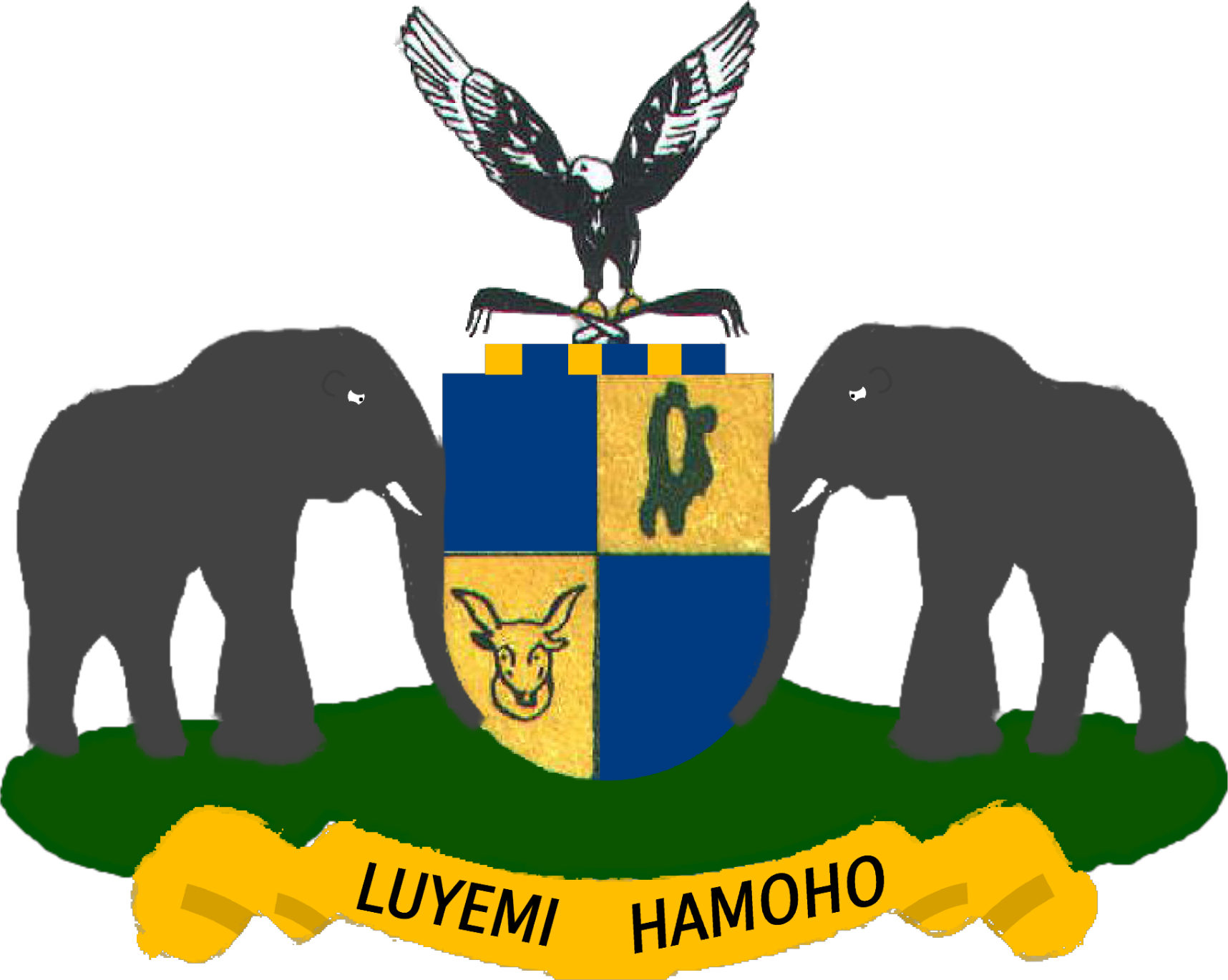
- Flag Coat of arms

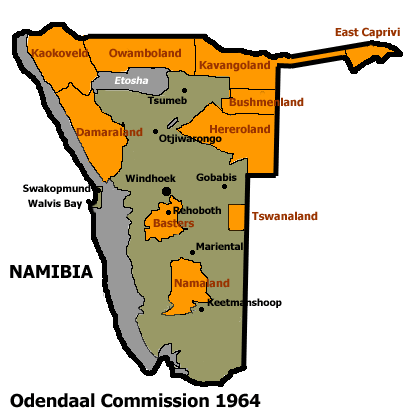
- Allocation of land to Bantustans according to the Odendaal Plan. East Caprivi is in the top right corner.

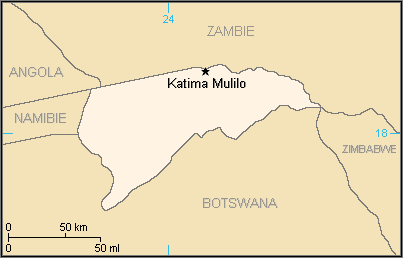
- Map of the Bantustan
- Status: Bantustan (1972–1980); Second-tier authority (1980–1989)
- Capital: Katima Mulilo
- Common languages: Subiya; English; Afrikaans
- History
  - Self-government: 1972
  - Re-integrated into Namibia: May 1989
- Currency: South African rand
Preceded by	Succeeded by
South West Africa	Namibia

East Caprivi or Itenge was a Bantustan and later a non-geographic ethnic-based second-tier authority, the Representative Authority of the Caprivis in South West Africa (present-day Namibia), intended by the apartheid government to be a self-governing homeland for the Masubiya people.

== Administrative history ==
=== Bantustan (1972–1980) ===
It was set up in 1972, in the very corner of the Namibian panhandle called the Caprivi Strip. It was granted a self-governing status in 1976.

Unlike the other homelands in South West Africa, East Caprivi was administered through the Department of Bantu Administration and Development in Pretoria.

=== Representative authority (1980–1989) ===
Following the Turnhalle Constitutional Conference the system of Bantustans was replaced in 1980 by Representative Authorities which functioned on the basis of ethnicity only and were no longer based on geographically defined areas.

Representative Authorities had executive and legislative competencies, being made up of elected Legislative Assemblies which would appoint Executive Committees led by chairmen.

As second-tier authorities, forming an intermediate tier between central and local government, the representative authorities had responsibility for land tenure, agriculture, education up to primary level, teachers' training, health services, and social welfare and pensions and their Legislative Assemblies had the ability to pass legislation known as Ordinances.

=== Transition to independence (1989–1990) ===
East Caprivi, like other homelands in South West Africa, was abolished in May 1989 at the start of the transition to independence.

== See also ==
- Caprivi Liberation Army
