= Katuutire Kaura =

Namibian politician (1941–2022)

Katuutire Kaura (3 February 1941 – 22 January 2022) was a Namibian politician. He was president of the Democratic Turnhalle Alliance (DTA) from 1998 to 2013 and was the official leader of the opposition from 2000 to 2005.

== Life and career ==
Kaura was born in Ombujondjupa in South West Africa, then administered by the Union of South Africa (today the Otjozondjupa Region of Namibia). He went into exile in the United States during the 1970s and taught at Nyack High School in Upper Nyack, New York from 1972 to 1978; he also taught at Rockland Community College from 1973 to 1975. During the same period, Kaura attended the universities of Long Island and Columbia.

From 1989 to 1998, Kaura was vice president of the Democratic Turnhalle Alliance (DTA). After DTA President Mishake Muyongo expressed support for Caprivi secession in 1998, he was suspended from the DTA in August 1998, and Kaura became DTA president. He called for Muyongo, who had fled into exile, to be brought back to Namibia and put on trial.

Immediately prior to independence, Kaura was a member of the Constituent Assembly, which was in place from November 1989 to March 1990. He has served as a member of the National Assembly of Namibia from independence in 1990 until 2015. He ran for President of Namibia in 1999 and 2004, receiving 9.6 percent and 5.12 percent of the vote, respectively. Following the 1999 election, he became leader of the official opposition (composed of the DTA and the United Democratic Front) in April 2000.

In the 2013 DTA elective central committee meeting, McHenry Venaani defeated Kaura by a margin of 96 to 52 and assumed the party presidency. After publicly criticising Venaani's leadership, Kaura was brought before a DTA disciplinary committee and expelled from the party in February 2014. He was also to lose his seat in the National Assembly in the process to Venaani, but a court case brought by Kaura days after the decision was not contested by the DTA, and Kaura was reinstated both as parliamentarian and party member. He left the National Assembly at the end of his term in March 2015 and joined the ruling SWAPO party in November 2017.

Kaura died at Roman Catholic Hospital in Windhoek at the age of 80 from COVID-19.
