= Lungameni =

Lungameni is a surname. Notable people with the surname include:

- Tangeni Lungameni (born 1992), Namibian cricketer
- Naftal Lungameni Sakaria, Namibian police officer
