= Naftal Lungameni Sakaria =

Namibian police officer

Regional Commander for Oshana
- In office August 2023 – 28 April 2026

Presidential Security Chief

Gold Commander for Etosha National Park
- Incumbent
- Assumed office 28 April 2026

Naftal Lungameni Sakaria is a Namibian police officer who has served as the regional commander for Oshana from 2022 to April 2026 and the Gold Commander for Etosha National Park for two non-consecutive terms since 2023. In May 2026 he was appointed as Presidential Security Chief.

== Career and views ==
Sakaria joined the police force in 1996 and was educated with basic training at a police college in Oudtshoorn, South Africa. He told New Era that worked as a clerk for the paramilitary Special Field Force in Erongo Region and later elsewhere as an instructor. He would later serve as head of the Special Reserve Force until 2022, when he was appointed as police regional commander for Oshana Region. As Oshana police commander he launched a mission in the town of Ondangwa in August 2022 called "Operation Lungameni". According to The Namibian, the goal of the operation was community-oriented policing, cracking down on officer "negligence", confiscating illegal products, and generally lowering the crime rate.

In November 2022, Sakaria told a men's conference that, for the sake of their mental well-being, men should be willing to cry more and show their emotions rather than holding back their anger. He spoke in favour of "positive masculinity" in contrast to toxic masculinity and noted with alarm that 93% of Namibian cases of intimate partner violence were committed by men.

Sakaria was appointed Gold Commander of Etosha National Park's Anti-Poaching Safety and Security Squad in early 2023, for a six-month term. He vowed to crack down on poachers and offered rewards for informants. Sakaria was reappointed to the job in late 2024 for another six-month term, taking over from Theopoline Kalompo-Nashikaku, his counterpart as regional commander of Oshikoto Region.

== Personal life ==
According to New Era, Sakaria got his police diploma from the University of Pretoria. He also graduated from the Namibia University of Science and Technology (Windhoek) with a bachelor's degree in criminal justice and from the Southern Business School with a degree in policing practice.
