= Christina Van-Dunem Da Fonsech =

Namibian police officer (born 1978)

Christina Jackbin Nanghali Van-Dunem Da Fonsech-Shikongo (born 1978) is a Namibian police officer. She holds the rank of chief inspector in the Namibian Police Force. She is known as the "Nampol Iron Lady" for her role in establishing and revamping the community policing initiatives, especially in the Khomas region. She is also known for cracking down on fake pastors and unscrupulous traditional healers.

Van-Dunem Da Fonsech-Shikongo has been heading the Tourism Protection Subdivision since February 2026

== Private life ==
Born Christina Jackbin Nanghali Fonsech in Oshakati, her father is an Angolan trader, and her mother is Namibian. She changed her surname in 2015 to Van-Dunem Da Fonsech, and added the surname of her husband, Elia Shikongo in 2020.

At an early age she felt abandoned, and she never had an opportunity to be raised by her biological parents, and she grew up without knowing her biological mother. She had been moving from one home to another, which made her upbringing difficult. This led her to dropping out of school in grade nine and working as a nanny. Due to her financial circumstances, she was among the children that the former president Sam Nujoma paid school fees for, in 1992.

Van-Dunem Da Fonsech-Shikongo has two children, born in 2003 and 2005.

== Career ==
Da Fonsech-Shikongo joined the Namibian police in 2003, a week after giving birth to her firstborn. After her police training she was stationed in Oshana region. In 2012, she was transferred to Windhoek, where she headed the regional community affairs office, holding the rank of chief inspector.

During the police leadership of the retired inspector general Sebastain Ndeitunga, Da Fonsech-Shikongo was known for arresting self-proclaimed traditional doctors and prophets, especially in informal settlements around Windhoek. With Da Fonsech-Shikongo leading the police team, they were able to find and rescue some citizens who were kept in those churches against their will. In 2018 they were able to rescue a young woman who had been in hostage for three years after she left her job, sold her belongings, and came to live in the church. The police conduct these types of operations due to complaints that community members rise against the traditional doctors and self-proclaimed prophets.
