= Leaders of East Caprivi =

East Caprivi was a Bantustan or "homeland" and later a second-tier authority in South West Africa during the apartheid period.

Tenure	Incumbent	Affiliation
East Caprivi
March 1972 to March 1976	Josiah Moraliswane, Chief Councillor
East Caprivi (self-government)
March 1976 to 20 September 1976	Josiah Moraliswane, Chief Minister
21 September 1976 to 31 March 1981	Richard Muhinda Mamili, Chief Minister
Representative Authority of the Caprivis (second-tier authority)
1 April 1981 to 30 June 1984	Josiah Moraliswane, Chairman of the Executive Committee
1 July 1984 to 29 August 1984	H.J. Becker, Chairman of the Executive Committee
30 August 1984 to 18 March 1986	F.P.J. Visagie, Chairman of the Executive Committee
19 March 1986 to 19 August 1986	I.J. van der Merwe, Chairman of the Executive Committee
20 August 1986 to May 1989	A.G. Visser, Chairman of the Executive Committee

== Political Affiliation ==
- DTA - Democratic Turnhalle Alliance
- SWAPO - South West Africa People's Organisation

== See also ==
- Namibia
- Bantustans in South West Africa
- Apartheid
- Presidents of Namibia
- Prime Ministers of Namibia
