= United Democratic Party (Namibia) =

Political party in Namibia

- German name: Vereinigte Demokratische Partei
- Founder: Mishake Muyongo
- Founded: 1985
- Dissolved: Effectively banned since 2006
- Preceded by: Caprivi African National Union
- Ideology: Lozi nationalism Separatism
- Colors: Black, Blue, White, Red and Green
- Slogan: Unity - Peace - Freedom

Party flag

Website
- Website of UDP

The United Democratic Party (UDP) is a political party in Namibia, representing mainly people from Eastern Caprivi and advocating for the secession of the Caprivi Strip.

Following a government directive from 1 September 2006 to forbid all the party's meetings in Namibia, it is today effectively banned.

== History ==
The party was founded by Mishake Muyongo in 1985 as successor to the Caprivi African National Union. In 1988 the National Progressive Party split off. Originally a member of the Democratic Turnhalle Alliance (DTA) group of parties, it was expelled from this alliance in 1998 after it openly voiced support for the secession of the Caprivi.

It has been alleged that the party is closely connected to the Caprivi Liberation Army, a separatist guerrilla group fighting Namibia in the Caprivi conflict in 1998/99. The party activities stalled after most of the party's leadership went into exile. Following an attempted revival in 2006, meetings of the party were declared illegal in September that year.

== See also ==
- National Progressive Party (Namibia)
