= Boniface Bebi =

Namibian tribal king

Boniface Bebi was a Mamili, or tribal king, of the Mafwe in Namibia, from 1987 to 1999. Born in Linyanti, South West Africa (now Namibia), he succeeded Richard Muhinda in 1987, as the sixth recorded King of the Mafwe. After being involved in the Caprivi conflict, in which autonomy was sought for the Lozi people of the Caprivi Strip, he fled for Botswana, which granted him political asylum, after which Denmark granted him and Mishake Muyongo political asylum. His first-born child, Hoster Bebi, died in 2000; he lost a son while in Danish exile.

He was succeeded by George Simasiku as King of the Mafwe.
