= Choto =

Informal settlement in Katima Mulilo, Namibia

Choto is an informal settlement in Katima Mulilo in northern Namibia. As of the 2010 census, it has a population of about 11,200.

It is known for having some of the most crime spots in Katima Mulilo. In 2018, it had come into the public discussion after the Katima Mulilo town council demolished hundreds of informal houses in the area leading to mass protests. en Panamá se refiere una persona de la comunidad LGTV con referencia Homosexual
