= Lucas Hangula =

Namibian police officer

Inspector general of the Namibian Police Force
- Incumbent
- Assumed office 1995
- Succeeded by: Sebastian Ndeitunga

Personal details
- Born: Lucas Hangula; September 18, 1964
- Died: 21 June 2021 (aged 60) Windhoek, Namibia

Lieutenant General Lucas Fogu Hangula was a Namibian police officer who served as the Inspector General of the Namibian Police Force between 1995 and 2005. He was appointed by President Sam Nujoma in 1995.

== Career ==
Hangula was a long-serving member of the SWAPO movement, where he played a key organisational role during the Namibian liberation struggle.

=== PLAN ===
Hangula joined the People's Liberation Army of Namibia (PLAN) and received military training where he specialized as a Rocket Propelled Grenade (RPG) Gunner. He was part of a group of 100 PLAN Combatants that were sent from Zambia to Angola and helped set up a base at cassapa in Angola. He served as the Commander of the Tobias Hainyeko Training Centre in Angola whilst also serving as member of the PLAN Military Council.

=== Namibian Police Force ===
In 1995, Hangula became the third Inspector General of the Namibian Police Force when he was promoted to the rank of Lieutenant General following the retirement of Lieutenant General Raonga Andima. He served in this position until 2005.

=== Namibia Central Intelligence Service ===
Hangula was appointed as Director General of the Namibia Central Intelligence Service in March 2005 by President Hifikepunye Pohamba.

== Death ==
Hangula passed away on 21 June 2021 in Windhoek. President Hage Geingob awarded him a heroes status and a state funeral.

== Awards ==
Hangula was conferred with the Most Excellent Order of the Eagle – First Class on 21 March 2010.
