= Namibian Police Force =

Law enforcement agency

- Namibian Police Force badge

- Namibian Police Force flag
- Abbreviation: NAMPOL

Agency overview
- Formed: 1990
- Preceding agency: South West African Police
- Employees: 26876

Jurisdictional structure
- National agency: NA
- Operations jurisdiction: NA
- Map of the Namibian Police Force’s jurisdiction
- Area: 825,615 km^{2}
- Population: 3,022,401
- Constituting instruments: Constitution of the Republic of Namibia; Namibian Police Act 19 of 1990
- General nature: Local civilian police

Operational structure
- Headquarters: Julius K. Nyerere street Ausspannplatz; Windhoek; Khomas Region
- Elected officer responsible: Lucia Iipumbu, Ministry of Home Affairs, Immigration, Safety and Security
- Agency executives: Joseph Shikongo, Inspector General; Anna-Marie Nainda, Deputy Inspector General for Administration

Website
- www.nampol.gov.na

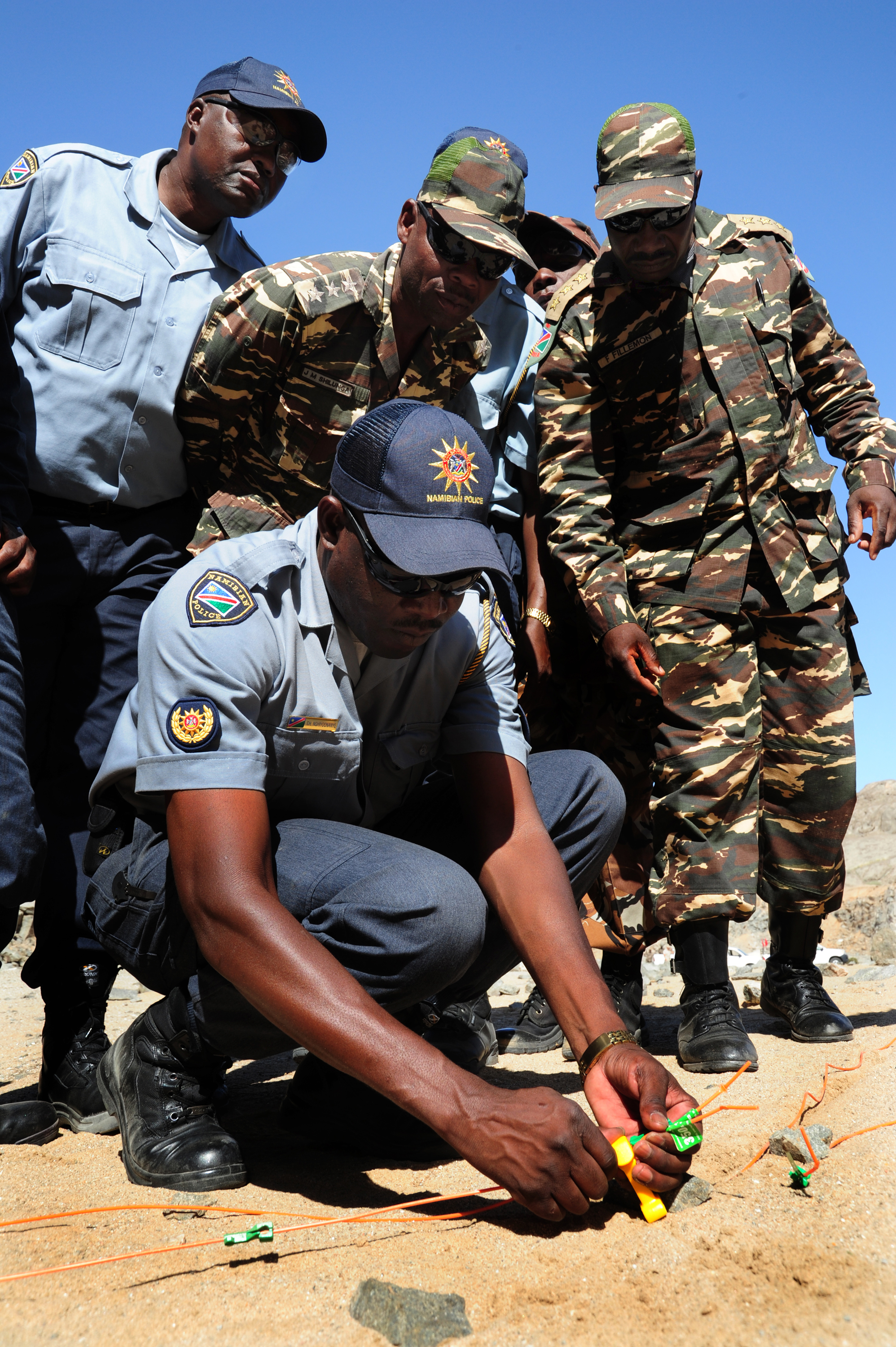
A group of NAMPOL police officers

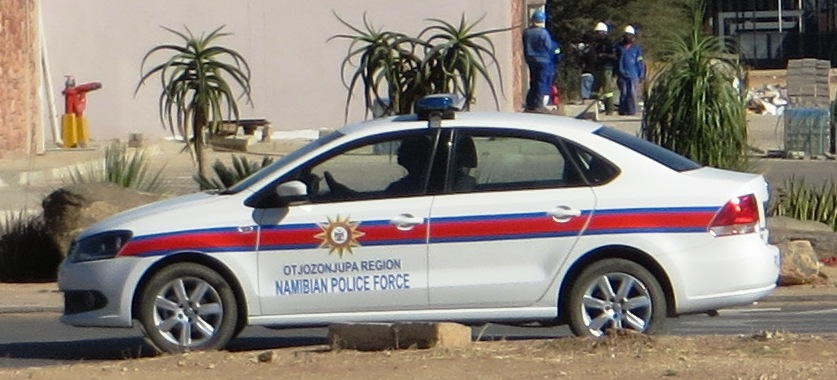
A NAMPOL police car

The Namibian Police Force (NAMPOL) is the national police force of Namibia. It was established by the Namibian Constitution and enacted by an act of Parliament. The Namibian Police Force replaced the South West African Police as the national police force of the country in 1990. Sebastian Ndeitunga was its inspector general since 2005 to 2022. Joseph Shikongo is the current inspector general. Shikongo was reappointed by President Nangolo Mbumba as the Inspector general in 23 September 2024. Namibian police functions are overseen by the Ministry of Home Affairs, Immigration, Safety and Security.

== Organization ==
The force is headed by an inspector general (IG) who holds the rank of lieutenant general. The IG has two deputies who both hold the rank of major general. The two deputy inspectors general are responsible for administration and operations.

=== Divisions/directorates ===
- Communications
- Finance
- Gender & Welfare
- Human Resources
- Internal Investigation
- Procurement & Logistics
- Training & Development
- FPPD Directorate
- Traffic Law Enforcement
- Air Wing Directorate
- Special Reserve Force
- Operations Directorate
- VIPP Directorate
- Special Field Force
- Special Branch
- Explosive
- Public Relations
  - NAMPOL Band
- Crime Investigation Directorate
- National Forensic Science
- Agronomic & Animal Husbandry
- Special Operations
- Principal Staff
- Prison Management

=== Regional commands ===
All police operations in Namibia's 14 regions are headed by a regional commander with the rank of commissioner. The Khomas region hosting the seat of government and capital city is an exception as the regional commander is a major general.

=== Ranks ===
Namibian Police Force Ranks
Rank	Lieutenant General	Major General	Commissioner	Deputy commissioner	Chief inspector	Senior Inspector	Inspector	Warrant officer Class 1	Warrant officer Class 2	Sergeant Class 1	Sergeant Class 2	Constable

== Equipment ==
The Air Wing Directorate operates a fleet of 3 helicopters.

Helicopters

- 1 Eurocopter EC145 Helicopter
- 2 Eurocopter AS350 Helicopter

The Water Wing Directorate is small and consists of a number of swampboats stationed in Zambezi Region and a patrol boat in Walvis Bay.

- Dr Hifikepunye Pohamba Patrol Boat

== Notable Police officers ==
=== Inspectors general ===
- Lieutenant General Peter Abraham Fouché, inspector general 1990–1992
- Lieutenant General Jesaya Raonga Andima, inspector general 1993–1995
- Lieutenant General Lucas Hangula, inspector general 1995–2005
- Lieutenant General Sebastian Ndeitunga, inspector general 2005–2022
- Lieutenant General Joseph Shikongo, inspector general since 2022

=== Other Commissioner ranks ===
- Danger Ashipala, Commissioner of the Special Field Force 1996–2007
- Chief Inspector Christina Van-Dunem Da Fonsech, active since 2003
- Evirastus Hitjivirue Kaaronda, Commissioner of Crime investigation Unit 2017-2020.
- Inspector Marthinus Tjombe, Hochfeld station Commander 2016-2019
- Benard Mulaula, Deputy Commissioner (Rtd) Drug Law Enforcement Unit 2018-2021
- Naftal Lungameni Sakaria, Oshana regional commander since 2022
