= John Manyarara =

Zimbabwean judge

John Oliver Manyarara (11 August 1930 – 28 May 2010) was a judge at the High Court of Zimbabwe, Judge of Appeal of the Zimbabwe Supreme Court, and Acting Judge at the High Court in Windhoek, Namibia. He was also the founding chairperson of the Media Institute of Southern Africa (MISA) Trust Fund Board; an award for investigative journalism carries his name.

== Biography ==
Manyarara graduated from Rhodes University, South Africa with a Bachelor of Arts. He began his career in broadcasting and journalism, and later became a barrister in England and in Wales. He served the Zimbabwe High Court and Supreme Court before his retirement in 1994 and later moved to Namibia. There he became Acting Judge of the High Court in 2000 (judges beyond the retirement age of 65 can only be appointed into acting positions), a position he filled until his death in 2010. In this position he presided over several high-profile cases, including both parts of the Caprivi treason trial, the largest trial in Namibian history. The John Manyarara Investigative Journalism Award by the Media Institute of Southern Africa honours his name.
