= John Mabuku =

Namibian politician (died 2008)

John Mabuku (died July 13, 2008) was the governor of Caprivi Region in Namibia and secessionist supporter of an independent Caprivi Strip. Mabuku, a former Democratic Turnhalle Alliance National Council member, fled to exile in Botswana with former DTA leader Mishake Muyongo following a failed separatist revolt in 1998 in the Caprivi Strip against the Namibian government.

Mabuku continued coordinating DTA activities from the Kagisong refugee camp in Botswana and continued to support DTA president Mishake Muyongo, who is in exile in Denmark. He died in exile in Botswana on July 13, 2008, after a long illness.

== See also ==
- Caprivi conflict
- Caprivi treason trial
