= Postal codes in South Africa =

Postal codes were introduced in South Africa on 8 October 1973, with the introduction of automated sorting.

== Format ==
South African postal codes consist of four digits. Mail may be delivered either to the physical address or to a PO Box, particularly in rural areas where no street delivery is available. In addition, many large organisations may use Private Bag addresses, with mail dispatched to the holder by a mail contractor.

In the case of cities and large towns, however, the last two digits of the postal code indicate the mode of delivery. The digits "01" indicate a street address and "00" a PO Box or Private Bag address, with addresses in Port Elizabeth, for example, using the following format:

300 Kempston Road
Port Elizabeth 
6001

PO Box 1840
Port Elizabeth 
6000

In Pretoria, however, a different format is used, with "02" indicating a street address, and "01" indicating a PO Box or Private Bag address.

370 Church Street
Pretoria 
0002

PO Box 427
Pretoria 
0001

A feature of South African postal addresses, also common to Australia, is that it is only necessary to include the suburb, not the city, for example, in the case of Yeoville in Johannesburg:

43 Cavendish Road
Yeoville
2198

== Former postal codes ==
The South African postal code system was previously used in Namibia, then "South West Africa", including the enclave of Walvis Bay, which remained part of South Africa until 1994. It was allocated the number range 9000–9299.

Following independence, use of the South African postal code system was discontinued.
