= Joseph Shikongo =

Namibian police officer

Inspector general of the Namibian Police Force
- In office 22 August 2022 – 06 May 2026
- President: Hage Geingob
- Preceded by: Sebastian Ndeitunga

Personal details
- Born: Joseph Shimweelao Shikongo; 18 September 1964 (age 61)

Lieutenant General Joseph Shimweelao Shikongo (born 18 September 1964) was a Namibian police officer who served as the Inspector General of the Namibian Police Force. He was appointed by President Hage Geingob on 22 August 2022 and resumed his duty officially on 1 September 2022 and his term ended on 6 May 2026. Shikongo replaced the retired Lieutenant General Sebastian Ndeitunga.

== Early life ==
Shikongo joined the armed struggle at the age of 14 in 1979, but because of his age he could not go through a military training. He was instead sent to Kwanza Sul in Angola and later transferred to Nyango in Zambia for his studies. Shikongo only received his military training beginning in 1983, learning war tactics and military skills at Tobias Hainyeko Military Training Center. Shikongo is specialized in Anti Air Defence Operations.

== Career ==
Lieutenant General Shikongo's early career begin in 1984 with his deployment at the 2nd Mechanised Brigade, and he was subsequently appointed as AD Battery political commissar. At independence in 1990, Shikongo was integrated into a newly formed Namibian Defence Force. He joined with a lance corporal rank and was later promoted to the rank of sergeant. In 1994 Shikongo was raised to the rank of staff sergeant, then to a lieutenant rank in 1998. Shikongo joined the Namibian Police Force in 2000 with the rank of Inspector. He was later assigned to the Prime Minister's office as chief of security from 2000 to 2003, then transferred to a Very Important Person Protection Directorate. In 2004 Shikongo was transferred from the VIPP Directorate to serve at Wanahenda Police Station in the Crime Investigation unit, and in 2005 he was appointed as staff officer to deputy inspector general of operations. After ranking as deputy commissioner, he was appointed in 2019 to serve as a Police Commissioner for Khomas Region. On 1 April 2021 Lieutenant General Shikogo was appointed by then-inspector general Sebastian Ndeitunga as major general as well as deputy inspector general of operations. On 22 August 2022 Shikongo was appointed as inspector general of the Namibian Police. He was dismissed from his position as Inspector General of the Namibian Police Force on 5 May 2026, following a security breach in which a naked man was found inside State House.

Apart from the national assignments, Shikongo has also been assigned international assignments where he has served in peace-keeping missions in Sudan, the Democratic Republic of Congo, and at the United Nations in New York.

== Awards ==
Shikongo was awarded of the Most Excellent Order of the Eagle, first class by His Excellency President Nangolo Mbumba.
