= National Progressive Party (Namibia) =

The National Progressive Party was a political party in Namibia. It was formed in 1988, as a splinter group of the United Democratic Party. The party was led by Patrick Mufalo Limbo.
