= Special Field Force =

Namibian paramilitary police unit

The Special Field Force (SFF) is a Namibian Police Force paramilitary police unit created in 1995 by the late commissioner Ruben "Danger" Ashipala as an auxiliary aggressive unit to complement the Special Reserve Force (SRF). It encompasses border guards, VIP Protection Unit and Installation Unit. Approximately half of the Namibian Police's (NAMPOL) overall complement is assigned to the SFF which is made up primarily of combatants from the former People's Liberation Army of Namibia (PLAN) and South West African Territorial Force (SWATF).

Among the population the Special Field Force is seen as the less educated and more brutal wing of the Namibian Police. They have been implicated in the intimidation, assault, torture and also murder of civilians in the secessionist uprisings in Namibia's Caprivi Strip in 1998 and 1999.

Also later, under normal and calm political conditions, human rights groups accused the Special Field Force of several atrocities, e.g.:

- 2002 in May officers of the Special Field Force detained and assaulted Namibian men suspected of being gay.
- 2003 in October nine minors were arrested on suspicion of housebreaking. Several police officers wearing SFF uniforms, as well as plain-clothes detectives, reportedly beat and tortured them with whips and electric shocks.
- 2006, on February 17, two off duty members of the Okahao Police's Special Field Force, constables Amadhila and Kamanya, allegedly led a mob in the assault of two women accused of witchcraft.
- 2006, March 2, members of the SFF police unit and the Namibian Defence Force (NDF), who were sent to Mariental to maintain law and order after a flood, randomly assaulted residents of the town.
- 2007, on June 5, SFF executed an unprovoked attack on demonstrating war veterans.
