= Postal codes in Namibia =

After 28 years without a postal code system in Namibia, the national postal service provider NamPost introduced new postal codes in December 2018.

They consist of five digits, where the first two indicate the region, the last two the post office and the third digit is always a 0.

Address format examples

Details (as variables)	P.O. Box	Private Bag	Postal Storage (poste restante)	Physical Address (urban areas)	Physical Address (rural areas)	Physical Address (informal areas)
[addressee]	Mr G. Bailey	Ms Virginia Freeman	Mr Wilmarc LEWIES	Nangula Hamuteny	Ms Rosalia Iwata	P Rossouw
[additional/unit]		Home Loans	Poste Restante			Plot 10-F
[organization]		First National Bank				
[premises/building]				Punyu Complex	Onamulunga Communal Area	
[street or sub-locality]				11 Mermaid Street	Olukondo Village	Section 13
[locality]				Ocean View	Onethindi	Extension 3
[p.o. box/private bag]	P.O. Box 999	Private Bag 13678				
[post office]	OKAHANDJA	WINDHOEK	KHOMASDAL	UIS	ONDANGWA	GOREANGAB
[post code]	12004	10005	10011	13010	15002	10030
[only if from abroad]	NAMIBIA	NAMIBIA	NAMIBIA	NAMIBIA	NAMIBIA	NAMIBIA

== Erongo region ==
- Arandis: 13006
- Henties Bay: 13005
- Karibib: 13008
- Kuisebmund: 13015
- Mondesa: 13004
- Narraville: 13014
- Okombahe: 13012
- Omaruru: 13009
- Omatjete: 13011
- Swakopmund: 13001
- Uis: 13010
- Usakos: 13007
- Vineta: 13003
- Walvis Bay: 13013
- Woermann & Brock Centre Kiosk: 13002

== Hardap region ==
- Aranos: 22004
- Gibeon: 22006
- Gochas: 22005
- Kalkrand: 22002
- Klein Aub: 22009
- Maltahöhe: 22007
- Mariental: 22001
- Rehoboth: 22008
- Stampriet: 22003

== Kavango East ==
- Divundu: 19002
- Rundu: 19001

== Kavango West ==
- Mpungu: 18002
- Nkurenkuru: 18001

== Khomas region ==
- Ausspannplatz: 10017
- Auas Valley: 10018
- Bachbrecht: 10007
- China Town: 10029
- Craft Center: 10027
- Dordabis: 10008
- Eros: 10009
- GAME Kiosk: 10003
- Goreangab: 10030
- Government Office Park Kiosk: 10010
- Hosea Kutako Airport: 10016
- Hybrid Mail: 10004
- Katutura: 10028
- Kleine Kuppe: 10019
- Klein Windhoek: 10012
- Khomasdal: 10011
- Kiosk Prosperita: 10025
- Maerua Mall: 10020
- Olympia: 10021
- Omeya Kiosk: 10002
- Okuryangava: 10031
- Otjomuise: 10032
- Parcel Depot: 10001
- Pelican Square: 10022
- Pionierspark: 10023
- Pionierspark Motors: 10024
- Rocky Crest: 10014
- Soweto: 10033
- University of Namibia: 10026
- Wanaheda: 10034
- Wernhill Pick n Pay: 10013
- Wika Service Station Kiosk: 10006
- Windhoek: 10005
- Windhoek Central Prison: 10015
- Windhoek Office of Exchange: 10000

== Kunene region ==
- Fransfontein: 21003
- Kamanjab: 21004
- Khorixas: 21002
- Opuwo: 21001
- Outjo: 21005
- Sesfontein: 21006

== Ohangwena region ==
- Eenhana: 17001
- Endola: 17010
- Ohangwena: 17005
- Okongo: 17003
- Ongenga: 17007
- Ongha: 17004
- Omungwelume: 17006
- Ondobe: 17002
- Oshikango: 17008
- Oshikango Savings Bank: 17009

== Omaheke region ==
- Aminius: 11002
- Epukiro: 11003
- Gobabis: 11001
- Leonardville: 11004
- Omitara: 11007
- Otjinene: 11008
- Tallismanus: 11005
- Witvlei: 11006

== Omusati region ==
- Okahao: 16008
- Ogongo: 16010
- Onaanda: 16007
- Onandjaba: 16002
- Onawa: 16005
- Onesi: 16004
- Oshikuku: 16003
- Outapi: 16001
- Ruacana: 16006
- Tsandi: 16009

== Oshana region ==
- Oluno: 15003
- Ondangwa: 15002
- Ongwediva: 15006
- Oshakati: 15001
- Oshakati Pick n Pay: 15004
- Oshakati Spar: 15005

== Oshikoto region ==
- Okankolo: 14007
- Okaukuejo: 14011
- Omuntele: 14009
- Omuthiya: 14001
- Onandjokwe: 14004
- Onankali: 14008
- Onayena: 14006
- Onyaanya: 14010
- Oshigambo: 14005
- Oshivelo: 14003
- Tsumeb: 14002

== Otjozondjupa region ==
- Grootfontein: 12010
- Hochfeld: 12002
- Kalkfeld: 12009
- Kombat: 12012
- Okahandja: 12004
- Okahandja West: 12003
- Okakarara: 12005
- Okamatapati: 12006
- Okondjatu: 12007
- Osire: 12008
- Otavi: 12013
- Otjiwarongo: 12001
- Tsumkwe: 12011

== Zambezi region ==
- Bukalo: 20004
- Chincimane: 20005
- Katima Mulilo Kiosk: 20002
- Mayuni: 20003
- Ngweze: 20001

== Karas region ==
- Ariamsvlei: 23010
- Aranos: 22004
- Aroab: 23005
- Aus: 23017
- Aussenkehr: 23013
- Berseba: 23003
- Bethanie: 23006
- Grünau: 23009
- Helmeringhausen: 23007
- Karasburg: 23008
- Keetmanshoop: 23001
- Koës: 23004
- Lüderitz: 23016
- Noordoewer: 23012
- Oranjemund: 23015
- Rosh Pinah: 23014
- Tses: 23002
- Warmbad: 23011

== Former South West Africa post codes ==
Before independence in 1990, when the country was under South African administration, it formed part of that country's post code system, but following independence, use of post codes was discontinued. South West Africa, including the enclave of Walvis Bay, was allocated the number range 9000–9299.

P.O. Box 287
WINDHOEK 
9100[4]

P.O. Box 44
SWAKOPMUND
9180[5]

P.O. Box 779
WALVIS BAY
9190[6]

However, the code 9000 was commonly used for all addresses for mail from or via South Africa.

Private Bag 13267
WINDHOEK 
9000[7]

Private Bag 5017
SWAKOPMUND
9000[8]

P.O. Box 953
WALVIS BAY
9000[9]

Walvis Bay remained under South African administration until 1994.
