= Holy Family Mission (Glacier County, Montana) =

Historic church in Montana, United States

- U.S. National Register of Historic Places
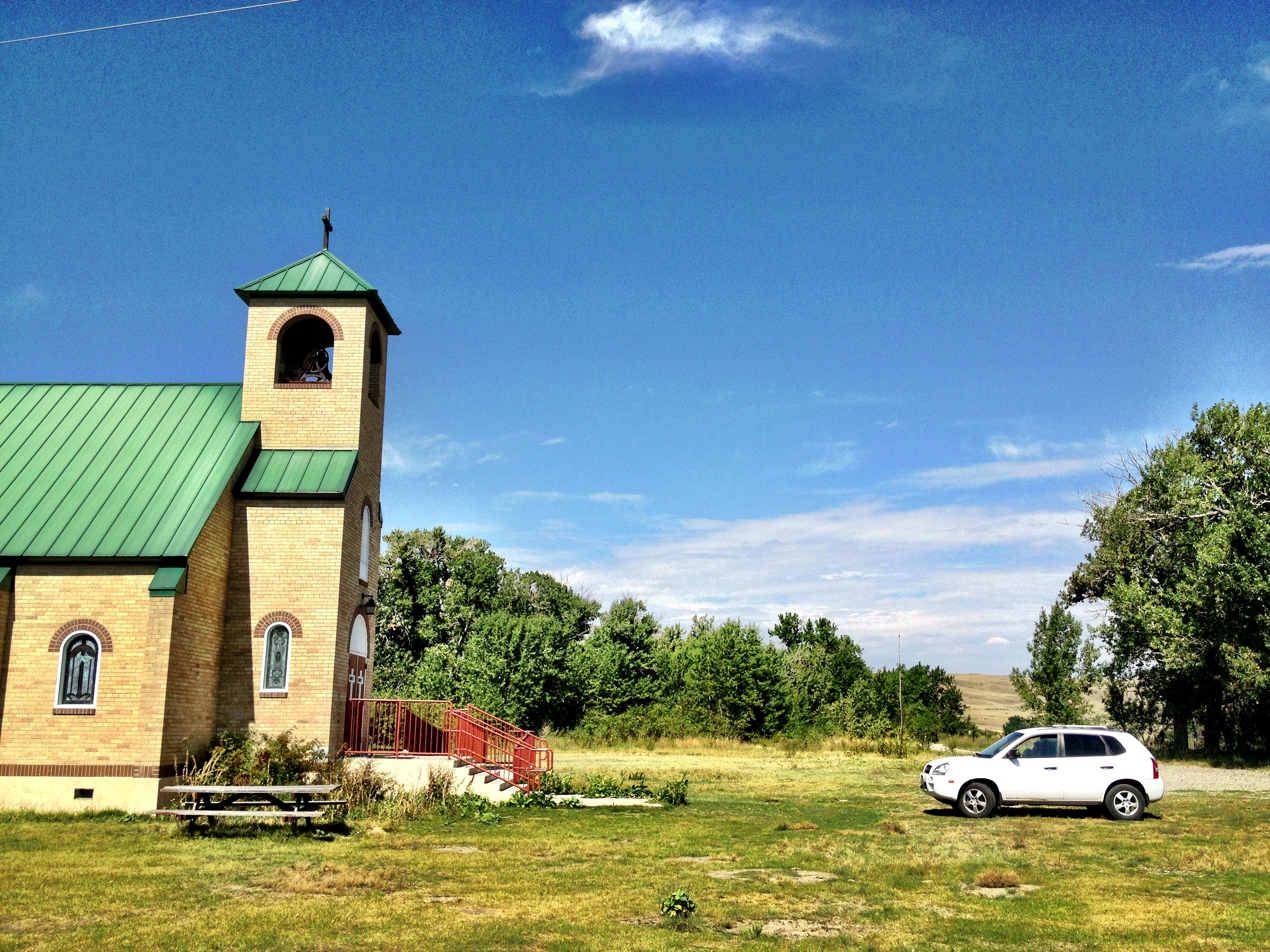

- Location within Montana Location within the United States
- Nearest city: Browning, Montana
- Coordinates: 48.481944°N 112.74°W
- Area: 44 acres (18 ha)
- Built: 1886
- NRHP reference No.: 82003170
- Added to NRHP: June 14, 1982

The Holy Family Mission, east of Browning in Glacier County, Montana, was founded in 1886. It opened in 1890 and served for 53 years as the center of missionary Catholicism on the Blackfeet Reservation operated by the Jesuit Order. It was listed on the National Register of Historic Places in 1982. The listing included eight contributing buildings, a contributing structure, and a contributing site.

Historically, the site included: the Mission Church, built in 1937; a Boy's and Girl's Dormitory, whose original sections were built in 1895 and 1898 respectively and were both 2.5 stories tall; a bakery tied into the Girl's Dormitory by a 1937 addition; two barns, only one on a partial concrete foundation; four shingled wooden outbuildings, and a cemetery, approximately seven acres across, with the earliest marked dates from the 1890s. Today, only the Mission Church, one barn, and the cemetery remain from the original listing, with a recent addition of three mobile homes linked by brick pathways.
