= Special Reserve Force =

Part of the Namibian Police Force

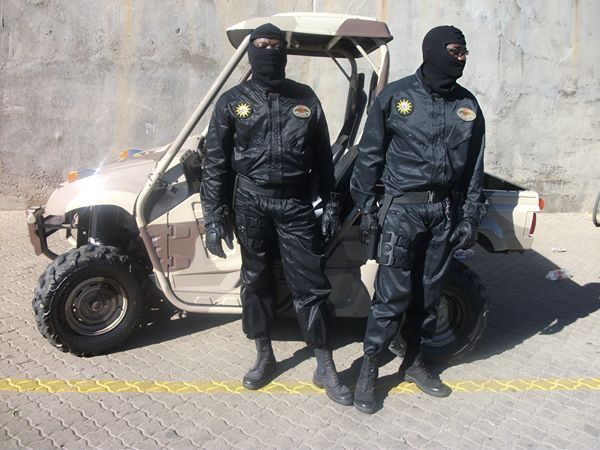
- Members of the Special Reserve Force-Counter Terrorist Unit (CTU) in 2014
- Country: Namibia
- Branch: Namibian Police Force
- Type: Police tactical unit
- Role: Counterterrorism; Law Enforcement
- Size: ~ 3358
- Stationed: National Police Headquarters
- Nickname: Para Para

Commanders
- Notable commanders: Dep/Com E benade, Dep/Com Sakariah and Comm Van Der Byl.

The Special Reserve Force is a division with in the Namibian Police Force. Primarily its role is a police tactical unit based on the Special Task Force of the South African Police Service. The unit was a reserve unit within Special Field Force then led by the late Ret Comm Danger Ashipala. They were first called Special Task Force in the early 90 but were disbanded in 96. They reemerged in the late 90 early 2000 and thus were called Reserve Force.

== Roles ==
They are trained to deal with special operations, riots, terrorism and search and rescue. The division is now in command of Dep/ Comm Sakaria who took over from now regional commander Comm Van Der Byl.

== Training and Operations ==
Training for the SRF is the toughest in the Namibian Police. Upon successfully completing the selection course the candidate is than tasked with a 6-week basic training which includes, shooting, hostage negotiations, counter terrorism, and riot control. Upon completion of the training the new member can wear the black beret and SRF badge. The unit has a close working relationship with the Air Wing directorate of the Police force as tactical movement and deployment can be via helicopter insertion including fast roping. Operators in the Directorate can also go for a parachute selection to become para qualified. Members can also be qualified divers.

== See also ==
- Namibian Police Force
- Special Field Force
- Namibian Special Forces
