= Sebastian Ndeitunga =

Former Governor of Ohangwena Region
- Incumbent
- Assumed office 16 November 2023
- President: Hage Geingob
- Preceded by: Walde Ndevashiya

Inspector general of the Namibian Police Force
- In office 2005–2022
- President: Hifikepunye Pohamba; Hage Geingob
- Preceded by: Lucas Hangula
- Succeeded by: Joseph Shikongo

Personal details
- Born: 1962 (age 63–64)
- Education: University of Havana

Lieutenant General (rtd) Sebastian Ndeitunga (nom-de-guerre Haitota) (born 1962) is a Namibian police officer and politician, he served as a regional governor of Ohangwena Region until 30 June 2025. He was inspector general of the Namibian Police Force from 2005 to 2022.

== Early life and education ==
Ndeitunga was born around 1962 in an Angolan village a few kilometres north of the Namibian border. He did not have a birth certificate until 1993 when he made a sworn statement to the Namibian Ministry of Home Affairs. Ndeitunga holds a Bachelor of Laws and a postgraduate certificate in maritime law from the University of Havana in Cuba.

In 1975 he became a SWAPO member.

== Career ==
In 2005, Ndeitunga was appointed inspector general of the Namibian Police Force by president Hifikepunye Pohamba. He succeeded Lucas Hangula. When he retired in August 2022, Ndeitunga was the longest serving police chief since Namibian independence. Ndeitunga was also vice president of the International Criminal Police Organization (INTERPOL) for Africa.

On 16 November 2023 Ndeitunga was called out of retirement by president Hage Geingob to replace Walde Ndevashiya as governor of Ohangwena Region where he served until 30 June 2025.

== Awards and recognition ==
- Outstanding Meritorious Service of Highest Order, awarded by the President of the Republic of Namibia,
- SARPCCO Medal for distinct service and the International Leadership Award from the United Kingdom
- Most Distinguished Order of Namibia: First Class, conferred on Heroes' Day 2014.
