= Linyanti Constituency =

Electoral constituency in Zambezi Region, Namibia

Linyanti
- Constituency
- Region: Zambezi Region
- Population: 10,425
- Area: 1,804 km²

Current constituency

Linyanti constituency (red) in the Zambezi Region

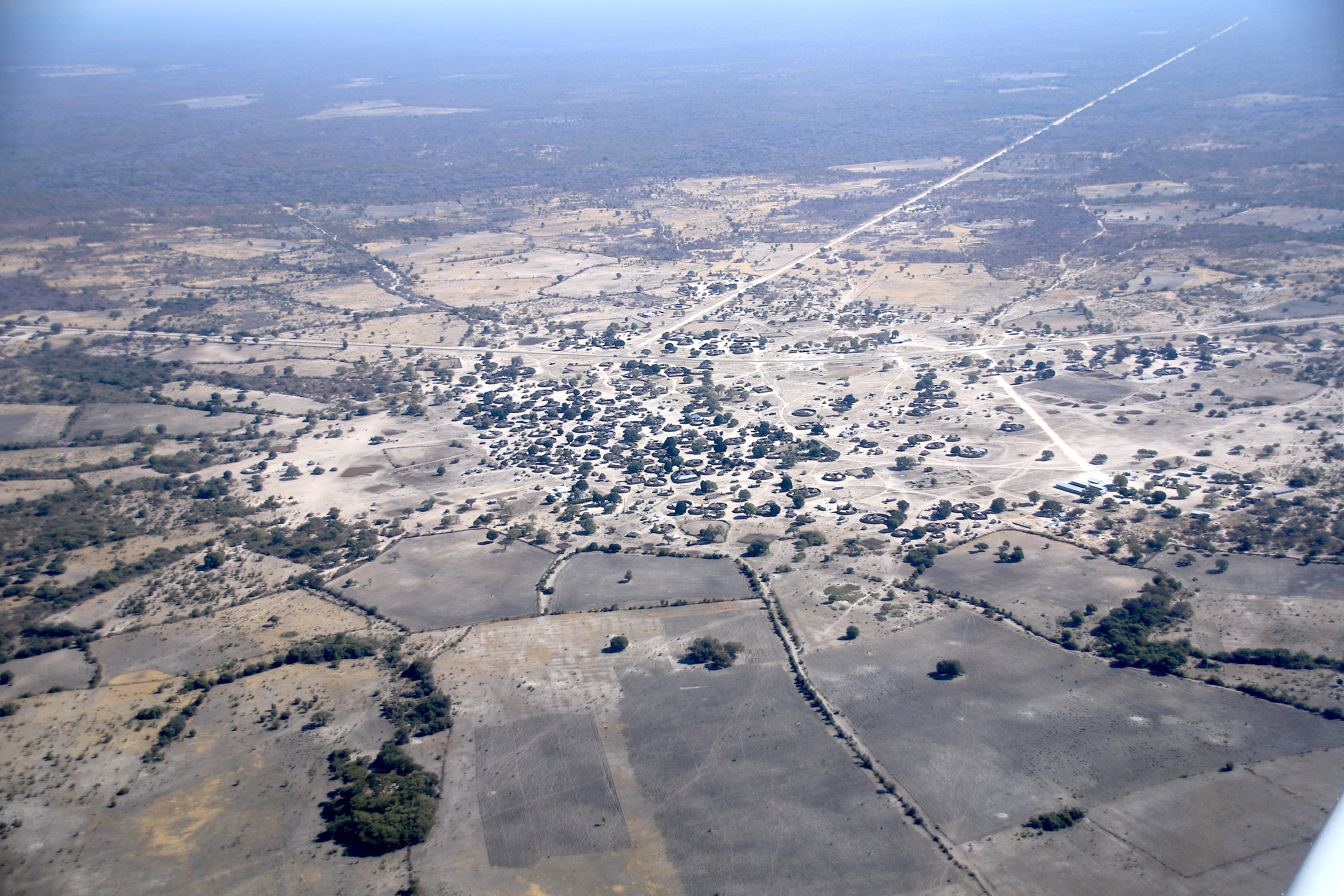
Linyanti settlement (2019)

Linyanti Constituency is located in Namibia's Zambezi Region. The constituency derives its name from the Linyanti River. It has a population of 10,425 and covers an area of 1,804 square kilometres, resulting in a population density of approximately 5.78 people per square kilometre.

== Politics ==
The first councillor was Fani Francis Sizimbo, a Democratic Turnhalle Alliance (DTA) member, who won the inaugural 1992 regional election and was in office until 1998. In the 1998 regional election the constituency was won by Lichaba John Ndubano in 1998. Ndubano, a SWAPO member, moved the SWAPO office from Linyanti to Sangwali. At that time the Caprivi conflict was simmering in the area. Ndubano did not support secessionism, and as a result was not liked in secessionist dominated areas.

In the 2004 regional elections SWAPO was represented by Dorothy Kabula. She received 2,473 of the 3,969 votes cast and became councillor. In 2010 Cletius Sipapela, also SWAPO, won the constituency elections. In the 2015 regional election Sipapela was reelected with 1,480 votes, followed by Ivene Visitor Kabunga of the Rally for Democracy and Progress (RDP) with 1,191 votes. Charles Wuyeni Matemwa of the Democratic Turnhalle Alliance (DTA) also ran and received 19 votes.

The 2020 regional election was won by Ivene Vistor Kabunga, an independent candidate. He received 1,903 votes and serves as the Linyanti Constituency Councillor. SWAPO's candidate Mwangala Sonnia Musukubili came second with 925 votes.

== Traditional authorities ==
Linyanti is the only constituency in the region with three Kings: King Mayuni of the Mashi Traditional Authority, King Shufu of the Bayeyi and King Mamili of the Mafwe. Over decades, King Mamili was the sole traditional authority in the constituency until the Bayeyi declared themselves an independent tribe in 1992 and Mayuni divorced himself in 1994 to form the Mashi Traditional Authority.
