= Katima Mulilo =

Town in Namibia

- Town
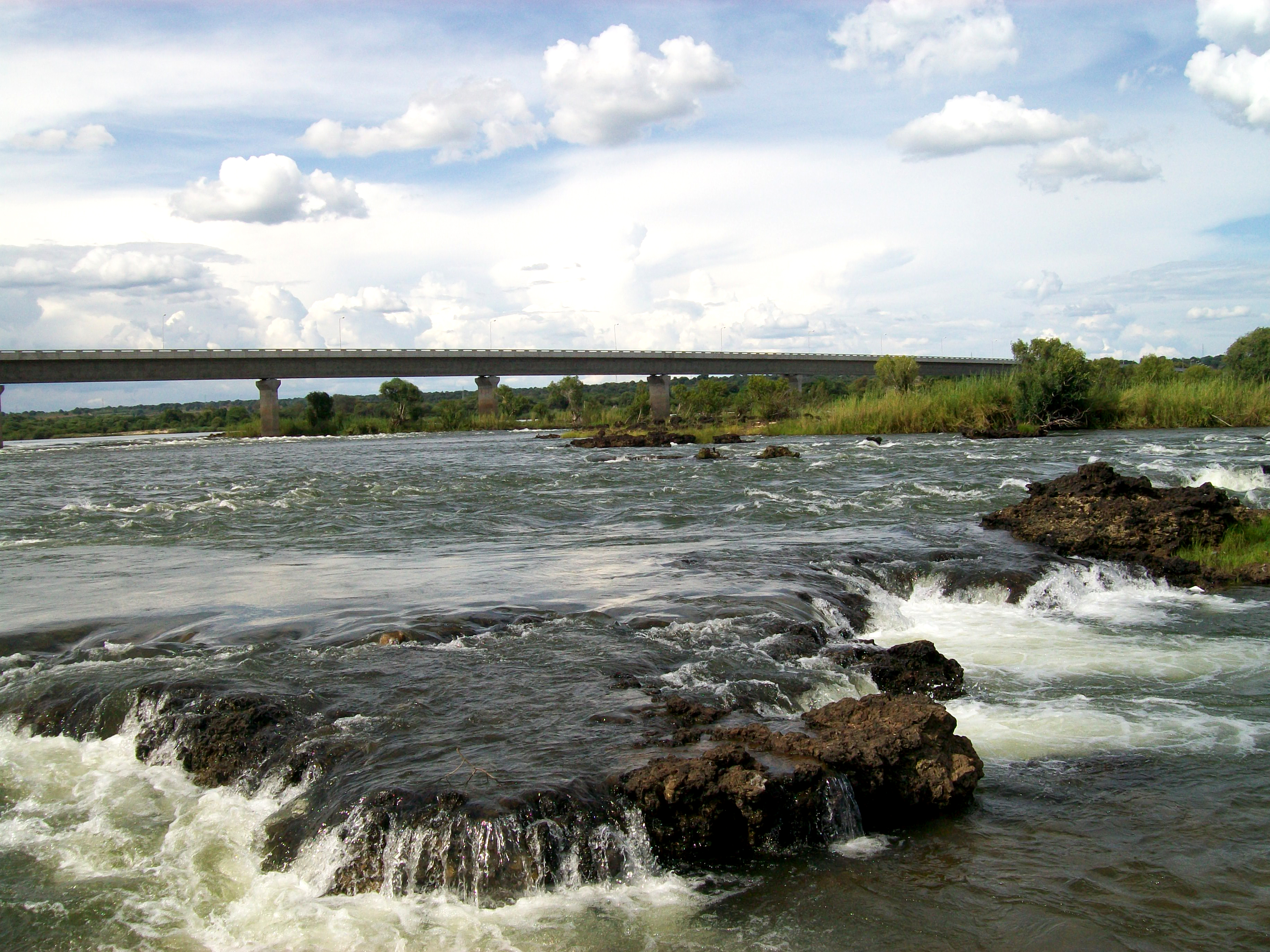
- Zambezi River
- Nickname: Ngweze
- Motto: Luyeme Hamoho (Together we stand)
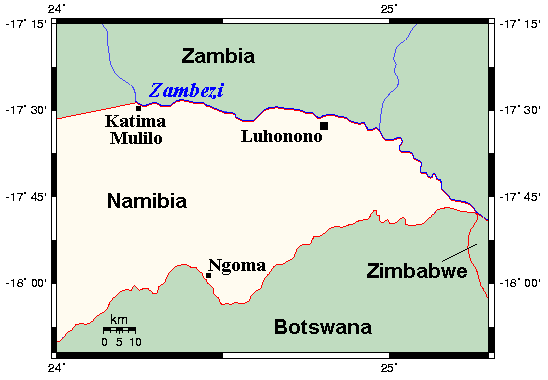
- Katima Mulilo and Luhonono

- Location in Namibia
- Coordinates: 17°30′14″S 24°16′30″E
- Country: Namibia
- Region: Zambezi Region
- Constituency: Katima Mulilo Urban
- Founded: 1935

Government
  - Type: Town Council
  - Mayor: John Ntemwa

Area
  - Total: 44.9 km^{2} (17.3 sq mi)
  - Land: 44.9 km^{2} (17.3 sq mi)
  - Water: 0 km^{2} (0 sq mi)
- Elevation: 950 m (3,120 ft)

Population (2023)
  - Total: 46,401
  - Density: 1,033/km^{2} (2,680/sq mi)
- Time zone: UTC+2 (CAT)
- Postal code: 20002
- Area code: 066
- Climate: BSh
- Website: kmtc.org.na

Katima Mulilo, or simply Katima is the capital of the Zambezi Region in Namibia. It had 46,401 inhabitants in 2023 and comprises two electoral constituencies, Katima Mulilo Rural and Katima Mulilo Urban. It is located on the B8 national road on the banks of the Zambezi River in the Caprivi Strip in lush riverine vegetation with tropical birds and monkeys. The town receives annual average rainfall of 654 millimetres (25.7 in).

The nearest Namibian town to Katima Mulilo is Rundu, about 500 km (310 mi) to the west. About 40 km (25 mi) east of Katima Mulilo lies the village of Bukalo, where the road to Ngoma branches off and joins Namibia to Botswana.

== Economy and infrastructure ==
Established and run as a garrison for a long time, Katima Mulilo still shows signs of its military past. In the city centre was the South African Defence Force military base and almost every house had a bomb shelter. The town benefited from the military presence in terms of infrastructure and employment, and there are still a number of military bases surrounding the town.

Since the opening of the Katima Mulilo Bridge that spans the Zambezi River and connects the Zambian Copperbelt with the Namibian deep sea harbour at Walvis Bay in 2004, Katima Mulilo has become a boom town that attracts significant investment. This development has, however, also fanned illegal business activities and driven the establishment of shanty towns to an extent that endangers social stability.

The town features an Export Processing Zone and the largest open market in Namibia. There is an important international electricity inter–link facility, the Caprivi Link Inter–Connector; its inauguration has improved the power supply to the town. The Zambezi Waterfront Tourism project is currently under construction. The Caprivi Vision, a newspaper from and for the Caprivi, is published in town.

Since being proclaimed a town on 2 October 1999, development has been steady, but Katima Mulilo does not yet compare to more established towns and cities in Namibia. Few streets are tarred, and there is a lack of street lights and sewerage. Many residents use the bushes for a lack of toilet facilities, and there have been many outbreaks of diseases such as diarrhea.

The town has been affected by corruption, financial mismanagement, and infighting between councillors. The water supply has been unstable because of debt to the national water supplier, NamWater.

=== Transport ===
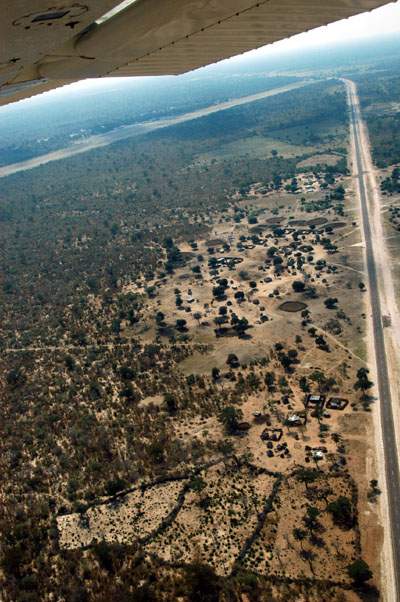
Crossing the Trans–Caprivi Highway near Katima's Mpacha Airport.

Katima Mulilo is the terminal town of the Trans–Caprivi Highway, and the highway, together with its extension to Zambia, is called the Trans-Caprivi Corridor. The Trans–Caprivi Highway was opened in 1999, and the bridge to Sesheke, and with it the entire Trans-Caprivi Corridor, in 2004.

Katima Mulilo is not yet connected to the Namibian railway network. In October 2007, a proposal was announced for a railway connection between Namibia and Zambia, which would pass through the town. The line would join Grootfontein to Katima Mulilo, then run for 130 km to Mulobezi with an 80 km upgrade of the line to Livingstone.

The town is served by Katima Mulilo Airport, situated about 18 km to the southwest, which is serviced by regular flights from the capital , Windhoek.

== History ==
The name Katima Mulilo comes from the SiLozi for quench the fire, referring to nearby rapids in the Zambezi. From early days (and before the advent of firelighting matches), there was river transport by barge (propelled by paddlers) along the Zambezi from Livingstone to Sesheke, onwards past the Ngonye Falls at Sioma, where an attempt was made in about 1905 to bypass the Falls with a canal. Barges were unloaded and dragged by oxen around the Falls. The route continued to Mongu, the administrative capital of Barotseland, and northwards to the settlement of Balovale (now Zambezi) in the North West of Zambia, at 13.551°S 23.115°E. When the barge reached Katima Mulilo, the fire was extinguished (but embers were kept), and the barge was unloaded and then dragged empty up the rapids, and re-loaded before continuing the journey – but not before the fire was re-lit.

On 28 January 1935, the administrative centre of the Caprivi Strip was moved from Schuckmannsburg to Katima Mulilo. This date is assumed as the foundation date of Katima Mulilo. The regional office, the only brick-and-mortar building at Katima Mulilo at a time when the area consisted exclusively of pristine forests, was built under a giant Baobab situated near today's SWAPO Party regional offices. In present times the tree is known as the Toilet Tree because of a rest room carved into it.

Katima Mulilo was very sparsely populated at that time. It had a missionary school run by the Seventh-day Adventists, and the small settlements were connected only by sleigh tracks. Without any roads nor other infrastructure it was difficult to administer the Caprivi Strip from here. The South African administration therefore decided to shift the regional office again, this time to Pretoria, in 1939. Given its proximity to important transport routes, particularly the railway bridge at Victoria Falls, the location of Katima Mulilo became strategically important in the Second World War which broke out soon afterwards. All military supplies, people, and goods had to be flown in. The town's first car arrived in 1940 and belonged to the air strip operator.

In 1940, William "Bill" Finaughty established the first shop in the Caprivi Strip in Katima Mulilo; the settlement that surrounded the shop was subsequently named after him. In the 1950s transport on the Zambezi River was established and allowed connection to the train service at Livingstone. The M'pacha Airfield, today Katima Mulilo Airport, was constructed in 1965 at a cost of 65 million Rand, an astronomical amount at that time when 2 Rand roughly equalled 1 Pound sterling. A police station was erected in 1961.

Katima Mulilo became a segregated town in 1965 when the erection of the Nghweeze township began. The South African administration was unhappy with the Mafulo informal settlement where members of the Caprivi African National Union (CANU) were staying and conducting political activism. As a response to this development, Nghweeze (derived from totela language:which literally means "stab me") township was established to enable some degree of control over Blacks by only allowing local workers and their families to take up residence. At the same time the central parts of Katima Mulilo were declared the Katima Mulilo Proper residential area and restricted to Whites. Contract workers from the company Lewis Construction from Salisbury (today's Harare) in Southern Rhodesia (today's Zimbabwe) that built Nghweeze camped in an area that for this heritage is named the Lewis informal settlement. The town had only 575 inhabitants at that time but grew to over 5,000 by 1978.

In 1971 the area around Katima Mulilo got involved in the South African Border War. As in World War II, it was a strategically important location, this time due to troop transports into and out of Zambia and Angola.

The settlement also was at the centre of the Caprivi conflict in the 1990s, an armed conflict between the Caprivi Liberation Army (CLA), a rebel group working for the secession of the Caprivi Strip, and the Namibian government. In the early hours of 2 August 1999, CLA launched an attack occupying the state-run radio station and attacking a police station, the Wenela border post, and an army base. A state of emergency was declared in the province, and the government arrested alleged CLA supporters.

== Geography ==
=== Suburbs ===
The oldest suburbs are Nghweeze, the former Blacks' township, and Katima Mulilo Proper, the area restricted to Whites during the apartheid era. Butterfly, Cowboy, Choto and Mahohoma are registered informal settlements of Katima, further parts of town are named Nambweza, Soweto (South–Western Townships, a reminiscence of the famous suburb of Johannesburg), New Look, Mabuluma, Lyambai, Bebi, Greenwell Matongo, Macaravan East and West, and NHE (from National Housing Enterprises, a governmental low-cost housing company that drew development here).

=== People ===
Historical population
Year	Pop.	±% p.a.
2001	22,134	—
2011	28,362	+2.51%
2023	46,401	+4.19%

The Lozi people are a Bantu-speaking ethnic group native to southern Africa. They consist of several tribes, including the Bafwe, Bambukushu, Basubia, Batotela, and Bayeyi, each with its own dialect and traditional authority. These tribes share the same Lozi culture and traditions. Silozi serves as the standard language that unifies them and is widely used in educational materials, media such as television and radio, and government communications. Additionally, Silozi plays a crucial role in preserving and promoting cultural heritage, serving as a common medium for cultural practices and ceremonies.

Additionally, there is a population of San, specifically the Khwe people, residing in Bwabwata in the western part of the region. The town's coat of arms, still very similar to that used by the Caprivi government, depicts these tribes as two elephants facing each other, symbolising unity and peaceful coexistence of the tribal chiefs.

=== Climate ===
Katima Mulilo has a hot semi-arid climate (Köppen BSh), bordering on a dry-winter humid subtropical climate (Cwa). Almost all rainfall occurs from November to March, when the weather is hot and humid although substantially moderated by altitude. In the long dry season between April and October the weather remains hot although less humid at the beginning and finish, but very warm weather with chilly mornings occurs at the middle of this dry season during the Southern Hemisphere winter.

Climate data for Katima Mulilo, Namibia
Month	Jan	Feb	Mar	Apr	May	Jun	Jul	Aug	Sep	Oct	Nov	Dec	Year
Mean daily maximum °C (°F)	31.3 (88.3)	30.5 (86.9)	29.8 (85.6)	29.1 (84.4)	27.4 (81.3)	24.5 (76.1)	25.0 (77.0)	29.1 (84.4)	33.8 (92.8)	33.0 (91.4)	30.3 (86.5)	29.8 (85.6)	29.5 (85.1)
Mean daily minimum °C (°F)	19.1 (66.4)	19.1 (66.4)	18.7 (65.7)	14.6 (58.3)	10.2 (50.4)	6.1 (43.0)	4.6 (40.3)	8.3 (46.9)	14.1 (57.4)	17.8 (64.0)	19.3 (66.7)	18.8 (65.8)	14.2 (57.6)
Average rainfall mm (inches)	169.4 (6.67)	160.6 (6.32)	88.7 (3.49)	17.7 (0.70)	1.9 (0.07)	0.5 (0.02)	0 (0)	0.2 (0.01)	2.6 (0.10)	18.8 (0.74)	69.7 (2.74)	151.8 (5.98)	681.9 (26.84)
Average relative humidity (%)	68	66	70	61	53	53	62	50	42	46	49	57	56.4
Source: Ministry of Works and Transport (Meteorological Service Division) "Ministry of Works & Transport: Tabulation of Climate Statistics for Selected Stations in Namibia" (PDF). 2012.

== Politics ==
Katima Mulilo is governed by a town council that has seven seats.

The first local election run after Namibian independence, the 1992 local elections, was won by the Democratic Turnhalle Alliance (DTA) which obtained 964 votes and gained four seats. SWAPO came second with 854 votes and three seats. The 1998 local authority elections was won by SWAPO. It obtained five seats with 1,426 votes. The DTA came second with two seats and 766 votes. Zambezi Region, whose administrative capital Katima Mulilo is, is since then a stronghold of Namibia's ruling SWAPO party.

SWAPO won the 2010 local authority election with 2,197 votes, followed by the Rally for Democracy and Progress (RDP) with 473 votes. SWAPO also won the 2015 local authority election by a landslide, gaining six seats and 1,875 votes. The remaining seat went to the DTA which gained 163 votes.

SWAPO also won the 2020 local authority election. It obtained 1,530 votes and gained four seats and the majority in the town council. One seat each went to the Popular Democratic Movement (PDM, the new name of the DTA), the Independent Patriots for Change (IPC, an opposition party formed in August 2020) and to the National Democratic Party (NDP), which came in at 448, 252, and 147 votes, respectively.

== Culture and education ==
Before Katima Mulilo was officially founded, missionaries already ran schools in the area. The Seventh–day Adventists operated one, as did the Capuchin Order. Today there are a number of schools in Katima Mulilo such as Katima High School, Caprivi Secondary School, Kizito Secondary School, Ngweze Secondary School, Mavuluma Secondary School and many primary and junior secondary schools.

Katima Mulilo has two institutes of tertiary education, the Zambezi Vocational Center and a campus of the University of Namibia (UNAM) for teacher training, formerly the Caprivi College of Education (CCE). At the time of the merger with UNAM, CCE had 400 enrolled students and 70 staff.

The town houses the community-based Caprivi Art Centre and holds an annual Caprivi Cultural Festival.

== Notable people ==
- Ryan Nyambe (born 1997), professional footballer.
- Kenneth Matengu, Vice Chancellor of the University of Namibia.
- Beatrice Masilingi, athlete, 2020 Olympics 200m finalist
- Lorna Mabuku, professional model.
