= Caprivi Liberation Army =

Namibian rebel and separatist group

- Leader: Mishake Muyongo
- Dates active: 1994–2002
- Country: Namibia
- Ideology: Caprivi Strip independence

The Caprivi Liberation Army (CLA) was a Namibian rebel and separatist group established in 1994 to separate the Caprivi Strip, a region mainly inhabited by the Lozi people. It operated only in the Caprivi strip.

== Background ==
The Caprivi Strip is located in the far northeast of Namibia. The region is a panhandle of Namibia eastwards about 450 km, between Botswana to the south, Angola and Zambia to the north, and the Kavango Region. During the "Scramble for Africa" period, the United Kingdom ceded the territory to the German Empire under the Heligoland–Zanzibar Treaty in exchange for access to the Zambezi River and to reach its other colonies in East Africa while keeping possession of German South West Africa.

The Caprivi Strip was of strategic military importance. It saw continual military actions and multiple incursions by various armed forces using the Strip as a corridor to access other territories. Many South African factions mainly handled those military actions during the Rhodesian Bush War (1964–1979). It was also a battlefield for the African National Congress and SWAPO operations against the South African government (1965–1994) and the UNITA operations during the Angolan Civil War.

== Formation and activities of the CLA ==
The front was created in February 1994 as a separatist group with the goal of uniting the Lozi people, who live in neighbouring Botswana, Zambia, and Angola, together. Since 1998, it has been under the leadership of Mishake Muyongo, who has been expelled from the Democratic Turnhalle Alliance of Namibia (DTA) as a result of his support for the secession of his home region.

In August 1999, the CLA launched many surprise attacks on police stations and many military posts in Katima Mulilo before the Namibian government imposed a state of emergency in the eastern part of the Caprivi Strip and beat the rebels. Fourteen rebels were reported dead, and as many as 200 were arrested and jailed. Most are still in custody as trial-awaiting prisoners in the Caprivi treason trial.

The last military ambush was executed in September 1999, where three members were killed in a shootout. The leader, Muyongo, was granted asylum in Denmark.

== See also ==
- Caprivi African National Union
