= Caprivi conflict =

Rebellion in northeast Namibia

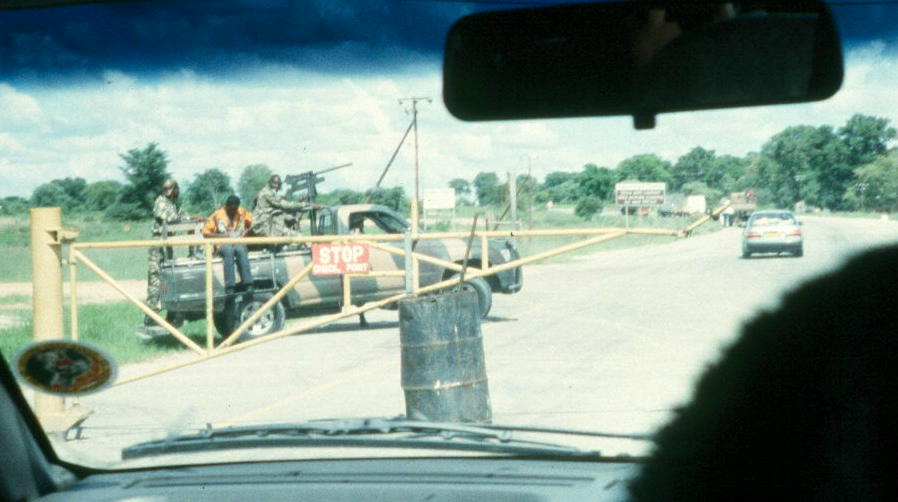
- A Namibian armed pickup truck serving as a military escort for a truck convoy through the Caprivi Strip.
Date	1998–2002 (4 years)
Location	Caprivi Strip, Namibia
Result	Namibian government victory

Belligerents
Namibia	Caprivi Liberation Army

Commanders and leaders
Sam Nujoma; Dimo Hamaambo	Mishake Muyongo; Boniface Bebi Mamili

Casualties and losses
Unknown	132 arrested
- 3,000 fled to Botswana

The Caprivi conflict was an armed conflict between the Namibian government and the Caprivi Liberation Army, a rebel group that waged a brief insurrection in 1999 for the secession of the Caprivi Strip.

== Background ==
The Caprivi Strip in the north east of Namibia is mainly inhabited by the Lozi people. They share a common language and history, and often feel more connected with Lozi people in neighbouring countries—Zambia, Angola, Botswana, and South Africa.

One cause of the conflict can be seen in a previous power struggle between Mishake Muyongo and the country's leadership (dominated by SWAPO) during Muyongo's exile in Angola. In July 1980, Muyongo was ousted from being SWAPO Vice-President, accused of involvement in subversive activities and pursuing secessionist ambitions. He was subsequently detained in Zambia and Tanzania, followed by an alleged purge against Caprivians in SWAPO.

After his return to Namibia in 1985, Muyongo formed the United Democratic Party (UDP) which joined the Democratic Turnhalle Alliance (DTA). He was president of the DTA from 1991 until he was expelled in 1998.

The Caprivi Liberation Army was formed in 1994, with the goal of self-rule for Caprivi. The Namibian government accused the CLA of being allied with the Angolan rebel movement UNITA. UNITA is very controversial in Namibia, since it helped South Africa fight SWAPO during the South African Border War. Elections in 1989 showed that the Democratic Turnhalle Alliance had a significant advantage in the Caprivi region over SWAPO.

In October 1998, the Namibian Defence Force with the support of the Special Field Force discovered and raided a CLA training camp. That resulted in more than 100 armed CLA men fleeing into Botswana, as well as some 2,500 civilians who feared the government's repression (including rape and torture). Among the refugees were the two leaders of the CLA: Mishake Muyongo and Mafwe leader Boniface Bebi Mamili, who were both granted asylum in Denmark. Namibia unsuccessfully demanded Botswana and Denmark to hand over the rebels, and President Nujoma called the rebels "traitors and murderers" and stated that they would be punished for their crimes. A few hundred of those who fled were repatriated, but others wishing for Caprivi independence joined Muyongo and Mamili, including Caprivi governor John Mabuku and councilor for the Linyanti Constituency Fani Francis Sizimbo. Also joining them in a camp in Botswana was the chief of the Kxoe people, another regional group under pressure from various governments, with a few thousand men.

Meanwhile, preparations for regional elections continued, and in December 1998 those were held. Since the DTA had seen many of its supporters flee the country, SWAPO was able to sweep the election, gaining all six seats assigned to the area. Turnout in the regions from whence the refugees came was below 20%.

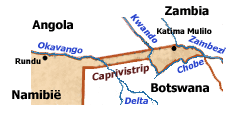
Map of the Caprivi

== 1999 Katima Mulilo attacks ==
On 2 August 1999 CLA launched unanticipated attacks on army base, border post, and the police station of Katima Mulilo, the provincial capital of the Caprivi region. They also stormed the state-run radio station (of the Namibian Broadcasting Corporation) and Katima Mulilo Airport. In the fighting that followed between rebel and government forces 14 people were killed, including some civilians who were caught in the crossfire. A state of emergency was declared in the province, and the government arrested alleged CLA supporters.

Support for the rebels had come from Angola's Jonas Savimbi and UNITA, and from the Barotse Patriotic Front. Both Angolan and Namibian forces, as well as UNITA, were accused of committing human rights violations against the population in the Caprivi Strip.

The government responded with violence and repression, and the declaration of a state of emergency which granted it broad powers, and suspected rebels were tortured while imprisoned, according to an Amnesty International report.

== Aftermath ==
Shortly after the unsuccessful secession attempt, about 3,000 people sought refuge in neighbouring Botswana for fear of reprisals from the Namibian government. They were granted refugee status and accommodated at the Dukwe camp. As of December 2015 there were still several hundred Namibians living in the camp, although about 2,100 had returned to Namibia.

In 1999, 132 alleged participants were arrested and charged with high treason, murder and other offences. Judgement in the resulting trial, known as the Caprivi treason trial was heavily delayed, and prisoners were only acquitted in 2012, a situation that Amnesty International repeatedly complained about.

On 7 October 2002, the Itengese nation severed all ties with Namibia and declared the independent, sovereign Free State of Caprivi Strip/Itenge their national homeland. However, this nation is not recognised by any other government, least of all Namibia.

== See also ==
- Lozi secessionism
