= Heligoland–Zanzibar Treaty =

1890 British-German treaty

- Signed: 1 July 1890
- Location: Berlin
- Signatories: Chancellor Leo von Caprivi; Friedrich Richard Krauel; Sir Edward Baldwin Malet; Sir Henry Percy Anderson
- Parties: Germany; United Kingdom

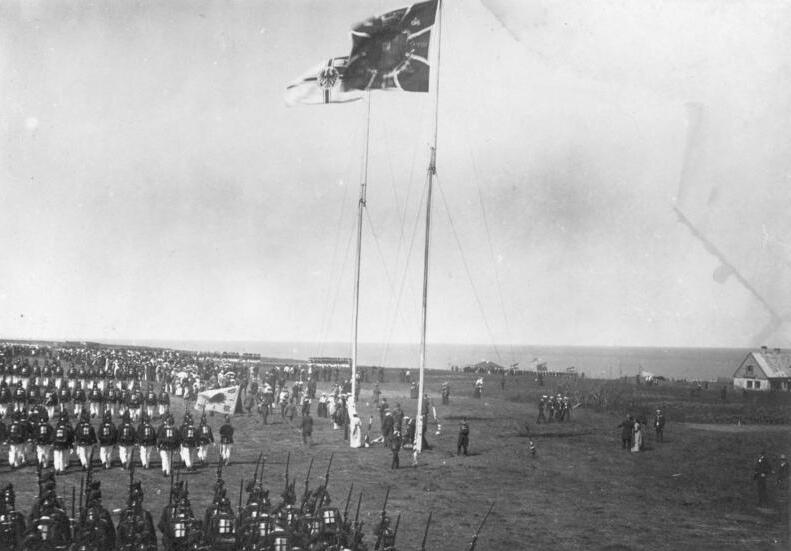
Handover ceremony on Heligoland, 10 August 1890

The Heligoland–Zanzibar Treaty (German: Helgoland-Sansibar-Vertrag; also known as the Anglo-German Agreement of 1890) was an agreement signed on 1 July 1890 between Germany and the United Kingdom.

The accord gave Germany control of the Caprivi Strip (a ribbon of land that gave German South-West Africa access to the Zambezi River), the strategically located archipelago of Heligoland in the North Sea, and the heartland of German East Africa. In return, Germany recognized British authority in Zanzibar. Heligoland was needed to control the new Kiel Canal and the approaches to Germany's North Sea ports. Britain used Zanzibar as a key link in the British control of East Africa.

== Terms ==
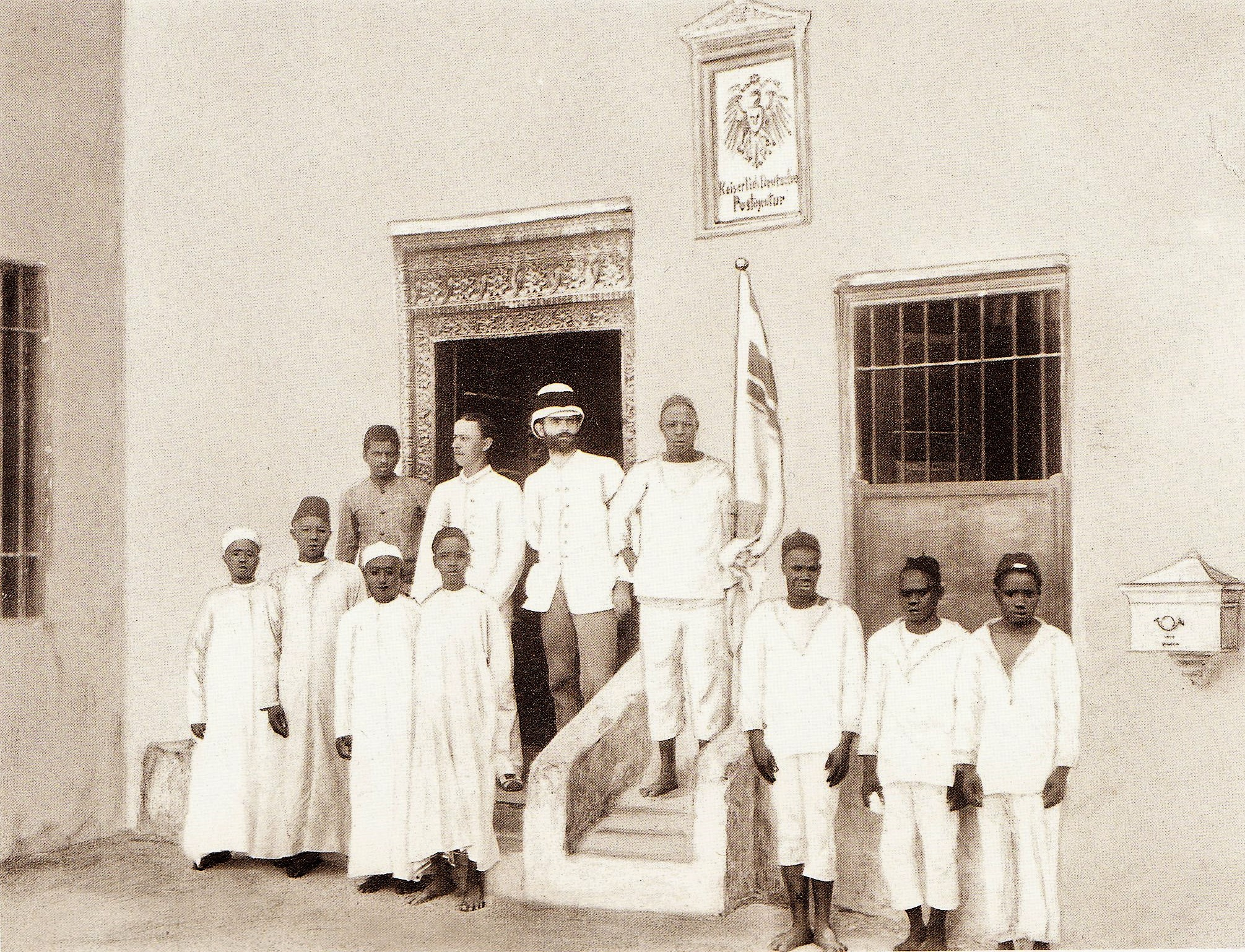
Imperial German Postal Agency in Zanzibar with its staff (1890)

Germany gained the islands of Heligoland (German: Helgoland) in the North Sea, originally possession of the dukes of Holstein-Gottorp but since 1814 a British possession, the so-called Caprivi Strip in what is now Namibia, and a free hand to control and acquire the coast of Dar es Salaam that would form the core of German East Africa (later Tanganyika, now the mainland component of Tanzania).

In exchange, Germany handed over to Britain the protectorate over the small sultanate of Wituland (Deutsch-Witu, on the Kenyan coast) and parts of East Africa vital for the British to build a railway to Lake Victoria, and pledged not to interfere with British actions vis-à-vis the independent Sultanate of Zanzibar (i.e. the islands of Unguja and Pemba). In addition, the treaty established the German sphere of interest in German South West Africa (most of present-day Namibia) and settled the borders between German Togoland and the British Gold Coast (now Ghana), as well as between German Kamerun and British Nigeria.

== Consequences ==
Britain divested itself of a naval base which covered the approaches to the main German naval bases in the North Sea. It immediately declared a protectorate over Zanzibar and, in the subsequent 1896 Anglo-Zanzibar War, gained full control of the sultanate.

The treaty served German chancellor Leo von Caprivi's aims for a settlement with the British. After the 1884 Berlin Conference, Germany had been losing out in the "Scramble for Africa". The German East Africa Company under Carl Peters had acquired a strip of land on the Tanganyikan coast (leading to the 1888 Abushiri Revolt), but had never had any control over the islands of the Zanzibar sultanate. The treaty gave away no vital German interests, while acquiring Heligoland, an island which was strategically placed for control over the German Bight. With the construction of the Kiel Canal from 1887 onward, control of the German Bight had become essential to Emperor Wilhelm's II plans for expansion of the Imperial Navy. Wilhelm's naval policies aborted an accommodation with the British and ultimately led to a rapprochement between Britain and France, sealed with the Entente cordiale in 1904.

The misleading name for the treaty was introduced by ex-Chancellor Otto von Bismarck, who intended to attack his despised successor Caprivi for concluding an agreement that Bismarck himself had arranged during his incumbency. However, Bismarck's nomenclature implied that Germany had swapped an African empire for tiny Heligoland ("trousers for a button"). This was eagerly adopted by imperialists, who complained about "treason" against German interests. Carl Peters and Alfred Hugenberg appealed for the foundation of the Alldeutscher Verband ("Pan-German League") which took place in 1891.

On the other hand, G. K. Chesterton called Heligoland "another fragment of the British robe which he [Lord Salisbury] cast away almost contemptuously in the North Sea".

=== The people of Heligoland ===
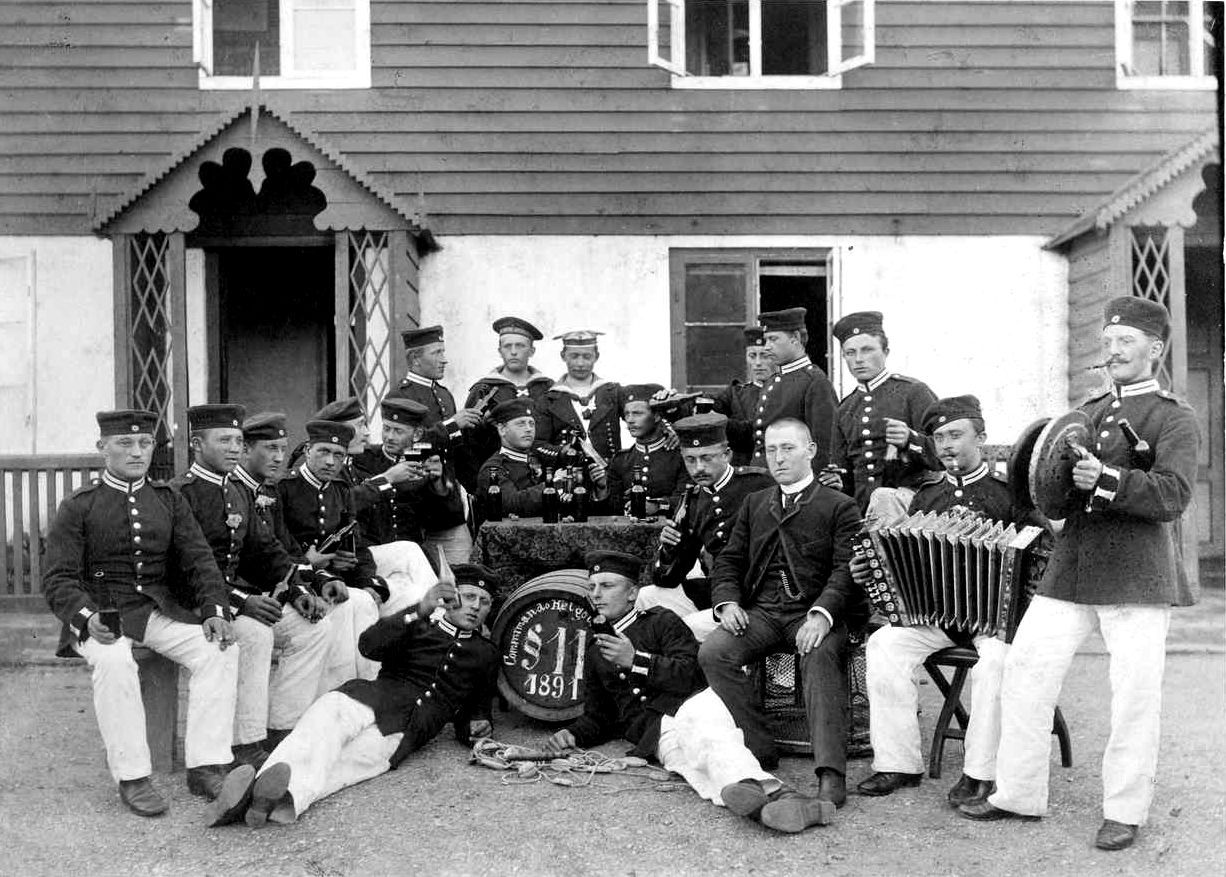
German soldiers celebrating in front of an English barrack (1891)

The people of Heligoland only played a minor role in the negotiations. But according to both the British and German intelligence services there was a high likelihood that the inhabitants did not want to become German citizens. This was reflected by the press, especially the British which criticised the treaty and called for a vote of people on the island to determine their own future.

As a result, the treaty ensured that the laws which were already in place persisted and promised a continuation of the islands practices. Until 1918 the inhabitants did not have to pay taxes, exemption from duty was granted until 1910, and compulsory military service was only applied to those born in 1890 onwards. But the phrasing of those special rights was so vague (“wherever possible”) that the introduction of an income tax and the exemption of voting rights for the inhabitants after World War I lead to desires of autonomy. The island stayed a duty-free zone until today extending the initial grant further than 1910.

By August 1914, the island was completely converted for military use. Resorts were shuttered and military reinforcements were constructed. Heligoland had been emptied of civilians due to German war preparations. British inhabitants were internally deported to the Ruhleben camp outside Berlin. Many Britons were targeted and arrested based on a "Black list" for associations with the British. Other, non-British islanders, were given temporary accommodation on the German mainland.
