= Mafwe =

Lozi ethnic group in Southern Africa

Bafwe
Mafwe

Total population
- >55,581

Regions with significant populations
- Namibia: 55,581 (2023 census) (Note: Including 12,183 Matotelas.)

Languages
- Chifwe

Religion
- Christianity

Related ethnic groups
- Lozi people

The Mafwe are a Bantu-speaking ethnic group native to Southern Africa. They are part of the larger Lozi ethnic group and have significant populations in Namibia and Zambia. Their language is known as Chifwe.

== Kings and leaders ==
Leaders since Kabende Sita carry the honorary title of Mamili.

- Sebitwane, Kololo King, ? - 1851
- Sekeletu, Kololo King, 1851-1863
- Mbololo, Kololo King, 1863-1864
- Lewanika, Lozi King, 1864-1909
- Moremi II, Tswana King, 1876 - 1890
- Sekgoma Lethsolathebe, Tswana King, 1891-1906
- Kabende Simata, Mamili, 1864-1914
- Simata Lifasi, 1914-1931
- Lifasi Simata Mamili, 1931-1944
- Simata Simasiku Mamili, 1944-1971
- Richard Muhinda, Mamili, 1971-1987
- Boniface Bebi Mamili, 1987-1998
- George Simasiku, Mamili 1999-
