= Caprivi Strip =

Geographical area of northeastern Namibia

Coordinates: 17.8700°S 23.0300°E

- Map of the Caprivi

- Location within Africa
- Country: Namibia
- Region: Zambezi
- Rivers: Zambezi, Okavango, Cuando

Area
  - Total: 19,531 km^{2} (7,541 sq mi)

Population (2023)
  - Total: 142,373

The Caprivi Strip, also known simply as Caprivi, is a geographic salient protruding from the northeastern corner of Namibia. It is bordered by Botswana to the south and Angola and Zambia to the north. Namibia, Botswana and Zambia meet at a single point at the eastern tip of the Strip, which also comes within 150 m (490 ft) of Zimbabwe, thus nearly forming a quadripoint. Instead, Botswana and Zambia share a 150-metre (490 ft) border that intersects a bridge at the crossing of Kazungula.

The territory was acquired in 1890 by German South West Africa in order to provide access to the Zambezi River and consequently a route to the east coast of the continent and German East Africa. The route was later found not to be navigable because of the location of the Victoria Falls, one of the world's largest waterfalls, about 65 kilometres (40 miles) east of the Caprivi Strip, and because of more waterfalls downstream such as Kariba Gorge and Cahora Bassa.

Within Namibia, the Strip is divided administratively between the Kavango East and Zambezi regions. It is crossed by the Okavango River. The Cuando River forms part of its border with Botswana, and the Zambezi River forms part of its border with Zambia. The width of the strip varies from about 32 km (20 mi) to 105 km (65 mi). Its largest settlement is Katima Mulilo, located at the point where the Zambezi reaches the Strip.

== Toponym ==
When Namibia was a German colony, the Caprivi Strip was known in German as Caprivizipfel. Before colonisation, it was known as Itenge. During a short-lived secession attempt around the year 2000, the name Itenge was used by the separatists. It is also sometimes called the Okavango Panhandle.

== Languages ==
Inhabitants of the Caprivi Strip speak a number of African languages, mostly members of the Bantu language family, with speakers of Mbarakwena [Xu-Khoisan], Hukwe a San language, in the northwest of the strip near the border with Angola. The Bantu languages include Yeyi (or 'Yei' or 'Yeeyi'), Mbukushu, Gciriku (or 'Dciriku'), Fwe, Totela, and Subiya. The Silozi language is a lingua Franca of the Caprivi Strip, especially in Katima Mulilo, where some residents speak Lozi, a language of western Zambia, as a lingua franca. Many also speak English, while Afrikaans has almost disappeared.

== Natural features ==
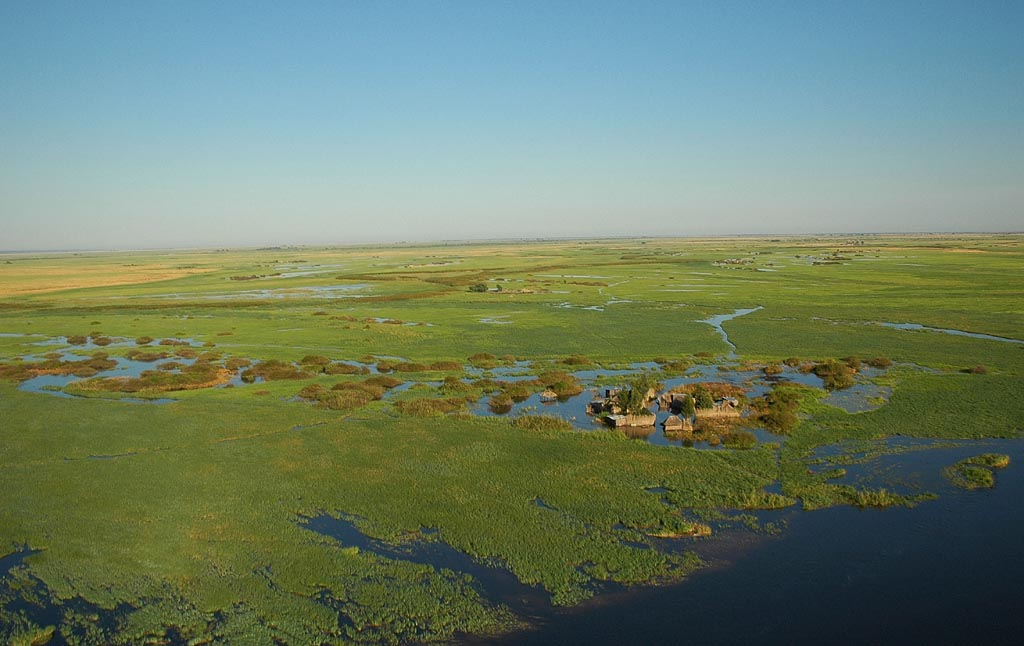
Village in the Caprivi Strip

Within Namibia the Caprivi Strip provides significant habitat for the critically endangered African wild dog (Lycaon pictus). It is a corridor for African elephant moving from Botswana and Namibia into Angola, Zambia and Zimbabwe. National parks found in the Caprivi Strip are Bwabwata National Park, Mudumu National Park and Nkasa Rupara National Park. Local communities have organised themselves into communal area conservancies and community forests. People work closely with the Namibian government to jointly manage natural resources through several programmes set up between the Namibian government and various donor parties.

== History ==
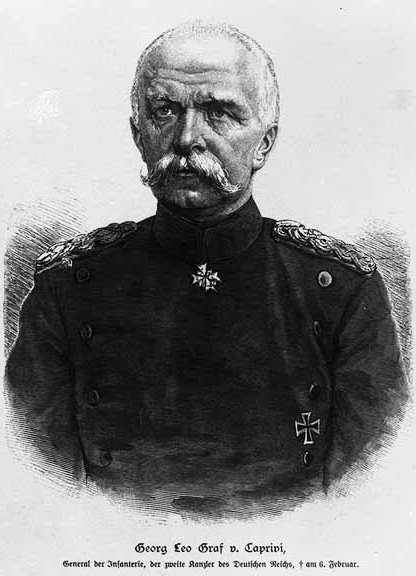
German chancellor Georg Leo Graf von Caprivi de Caprera de Montecuccoli, who gave his name to the Caprivi Strip

Caprivi was named after German Chancellor Leo von Caprivi (in office 1890–1894), who negotiated the acquisition of the land in an 1890 exchange with the United Kingdom. Caprivi arranged for the Caprivi Strip to be annexed to German South West Africa, gaining Germany access to the Zambezi River and a route to Africa's east coast, where the colony of German East Africa (now part of Tanzania) was situated. The transfer of territory was a part of the Heligoland-Zanzibar Treaty of 1890, in which Germany gave up its interest in Zanzibar in return for the Caprivi Strip and the island of Heligoland in the North Sea.

The river later proved unnavigable and inaccessible to the Indian Ocean due to the location of the Victoria Falls and more falls, a fact that was possibly already known to the British side during the negotiations. Caprivi itself was remote and inaccessible during the rainy season, and the Germans did not find use for it. After a mineral expedition in 1909 proved unsuccessful, Germany contemplated exchanging the strip for some other British territory, such as Walvis Bay. When that territory was transferred to the Cape Colony by the British in 1910, Germany was stuck with Caprivi for the rest of its colonial history.

In 1976, the South African administration established the self-governing Eastern Caprivi homeland with its own flag, national anthem, and coat of arms. It remained under direct de facto control of the South African government in Pretoria until 1980, when its administration was transferred to South West Africa's administration in Windhoek.

In the late 20th century, the Caprivi Strip attracted attention when Namibia and Botswana took a long-standing dispute over its southern boundary to the International Court of Justice. The core of the territorial dispute concerned which channel of the Chobe River was the thalweg, the bona fide international boundary. This was important, as, depending on the decision, a large island (known as Kasikili or Sedudu, by Namibia and Botswana respectively) would fall into one or the other's national territory. The Botswana government considered the island as an integral part of the Chobe National Park, whereas the Namibian government, and many inhabitants of the eastern Caprivi Strip, held that not only was the island part of the original German–British agreement, but generations of inhabitants had used it for seasonal grazing, for reed-gathering, and as a burial site. In December 1999, the International Court of Justice ruled that the main channel, and hence the international boundary, lay to the north of the island, thus making the island part of Botswana.

== Wars ==
During the Rhodesian Bush War (1964–1979), South West African People's Organization's and Caprivi African National Union's (CANU) liberation war against the South African occupation (1965–1994) and the Angolan Civil War (1975–2002), the Strip saw continual military action and multiple incursions by various armed forces using the Strip as a corridor to access other territories.

=== Caprivi conflict ===
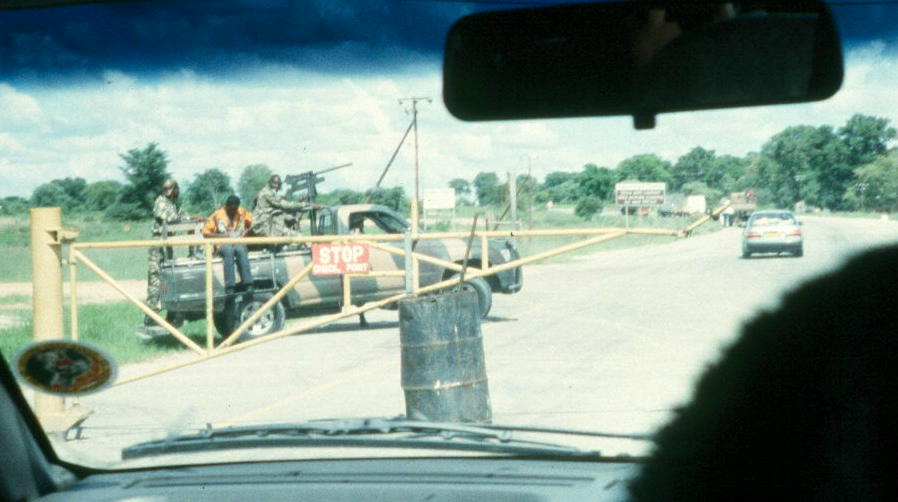
Namibian military escort through the Caprivi Strip.

The Caprivi conflict was an armed conflict in Namibia between the Caprivi Liberation Army (CLA), a rebel group aiming for the secession of the Caprivi Strip led by Mishake Muyongo, and the Namibian government. Its main eruption occurred on 2 August 1999 when the CLA launched an attack in Katima Mulilo, occupying the state-run radio station and attacking a police station, the Wenela border post, and an army base. Namibian armed forces quashed the attempt at secession within a few days.
