= Sesfontein Constituency =

Electoral constituency in the Kunene region of north-western Namibia

Coordinates: 19°8′S 13°37′E

Sesfontein
- Constituency
- Sesfontein constituency (red) in the Kunene Region
- Region: Kunene Region
- Population: 7,358 (2004)
- Major settlements: Sesfontein
- Area: 20,198 km^{2} (7,798 sq mi)

Current constituency
- Created: 1992

Sesfontein Constituency is an electoral constituency in Namibia. It is represented in the Regional Council of Kunene Region. The constituency office is situated in Sesfontein. The constituency covers an area of 20,198 km^{2} (7,798 sq mi) and had a population of 7,358 in 2004. As of 2020, it has 5,614 registered voters.

Sesfontein Constituency is bordered by Khorixas Constituency to the south, Kamanjab Constituency to the east, Opuwo Rural to the north and Okahao Constituency in the Omusati Region to the northeast. Sesfontein is the only settlement in this constituency, but this vast area contains a number of tourism facilities like the Palmwag and Warmquelle lodges.

== Politics ==
Sesfontein Constituency voters traditionally supported opposition parties for National Assembly and president. The area is historically considered a political stronghold for the United Democratic Front (UDF).

=== Regional elections ===
In the first regional election in 1992 Johannes Isaak Hendricks (UDF) won with 1,088 votes and became councillor. Munane Chris Mbomboro of the Democratic Turnhalle Alliance (DTA) came second with 616 votes, followed by Benny Ganuseb of SWAPO with 237 votes.

The 2004 regional election was again won by an opposition candidate, Hendrik Gaobaeb (UDF). He received 1,218 of the 2,298 votes cast. Gaobeb was reelected in 2010 with 1,344 of the 2,624 votes.

The 2015 regional election was won by Julius Koujova of SWAPO with 1,514 votes, while Gaobaeb of the UDF came second with 1,063 votes. Independent candidates Asser Ndjitezeua and Timotheus Hochobeb followed with 328 and 272 votes respectively. Amon Kapi of the Rally for Democracy and Progress (RDP) also ran and received 87 votes. In the 2020 regional election Gaobaeb (UDF) again became constituency councillor with 1,327 votes, closely followed by SWAPO's Koujova with 1,251 votes.

=== Presidential elections ===
In the 2004 Namibian general election, Sesfontein was one of the few constituencies in Namibia to vote for an opposition candidate for president in the presidential election, 2004. In that year, Justus ǁGaroëb of the UDF received the most votes for president with 1,259 (46.01%) total votes, while Hifikepunye Pohamba (SWAPO), who won more than 76% of the national vote, received only 896 votes (32.78%) in the constituency. Nationally, Sesfontein represented approximately 4% of ǁGaroëb's vote despite only representing less than .0033% of the national vote for president.

In 2009, Sesfontein Constituency again supported the UDF (1142 or 38.36%), though to a lesser degree than in 2004. SWAPO improved their vote total and percentage to 1092 from 896 (32.78% to 36.68%).

== See also ==
- Administrative divisions of Namibia
