= C43 =

C43, C-43 or C.43 may refer to:

- Alfa Romeo C43, Formula One car
- Beech C-43 Traveler, an American biplane
- Bill C-43, several bills of the Parliament of Canada
- C43 road (Namibia)
- C43 torpedo, a Chinese torpedo
- Caldwell 43, a spiral galaxy
- Caudron C.43, a French biplane
- Hiram Cure Airfield in Eaton County, Michigan
- Marshall C43, a British bus
- Melanoma
- Mercedes-Benz C43 AMG, an automobile
- Petrov's Defence, a chess opening
