= C35 road (Namibia) =

Secondary route in Namibia

C35 road

Major junctions
- South end: C34 near Henties Bay
- C36 at Uis; C39 near Khorixas; C40 at Kamanjab; C41 at Omakange
- North end: C46 near Ruacana

Location
- Country: Namibia

Highway system
- Transport in Namibia
← C34	→ C36

The C35, also the MR 76, is a regional road in Namibia that runs from Henties Bay at the Atlantic Ocean up to the Angolan-Namibian border in Ruacana. It is 620 kilometres (390 mi) long. It has been described as one of Namibia's "most desolate roads".

The C35 starts 6 kilometres (3.7 mi) north of Henties Bay, branching off the C34. Is intersected by the C36 at Uis, the C39 11 kilometres (6.8 mi) east of Khorixas, the C40 at Kamanjab, and the C41 at Omakange. It terminates at the C41 in Ruacana. The northern section between Kamanjab and Ruacana is tarred, the section between Henties Bay and Khorixas is to be upgraded to bitumen standard, too.

Between Uis and Khorixas the C35 crosses the Ugab, the Aba Huab, and the Huab ephemeral rivers. Respective bridges and culverts were built in the 1960s.
