= 3rd National Council of Namibia =

Upper legislative chamber, 2004–2009

Members of the 3rd National Council of Namibia, which lasts from 2004 - 2009. The chairperson is Asser Kuveri Kapere of the South West Africa People's Organization. 24 of the 26 members of the National Council are members of SWAPO, while one is from the United Democratic Front and one is from the Democratic Turnhalle Alliance. All Councillors below are SWAPO members unless otherwise stated.

== Members of the 3rd National Council of Namibia by Region ==
=== Caprivi Region ===
- Dorothy Mareka Kabula
- Leonard Yambwa Mwilima

=== Hardap Region ===
- Theo Vivian Diergaardt
- Barakias Namwandi

=== Erongo Region ===
Chairperson: Asser Kuveri Kapere

- Hafeni Ludwigh Ndemula

=== ǁKaras Region ===
- Hilma Ndinelago Nicanor
- Willem Appollus

=== Khomas Region ===
- Vice Chairperson: Margaret Natalie Mensah-Williams
- Rosalia Mwashekele-Sibiya

=== Kunene Region ===
- Sebastian Ignatius !Gobs - United Democratic Front
- Ngohauvi Lydia Kavetu - Democratic Turnhalle Alliance

=== Ohangwena Region ===
- Johannes Kamati Nakwafila
- Ruth Kepawa Nhinda

=== Okavango Region ===
- Sebastiaan Karupu
- Frieda Mwadina Siwombe

=== Omaheke Region ===
- Stefanus Orateng Mogotsi
- Kilus Nguvauva

=== Omusati Region ===
- Jhonny Haikella Hakaye
- Leevi Shiimi Katoma

=== Oshana Region ===
- Aram Martin
- Henock ya Kasita

=== Oshikoto Region ===
- Henock Tangeni Kankoshi
- Phillemon Ndjambula

=== Otjozondjupa Region ===
- Ferdinand Frederich Kavetuna
- Bartholomeus Tuhafeni Shangheta
