= C41 road (Namibia) =

Secondary route in Namibia

C41 road

Major junctions
- East end: C45 / C46 Oshakati
- C35 at Omakange
- West end: C43 Opuwo

Location
- Country: Namibia

Highway system
- Transport in Namibia
← C40	→ C42

C41 is a tarred secondary route in northern Namibia that runs from Opuwo via Okahao to Oshakati. It is 224 kilometres (139 mi) long.
