= Vipuakuje Muharukua =

Namibian politician

The Honorable Vipuakuje Muharukua
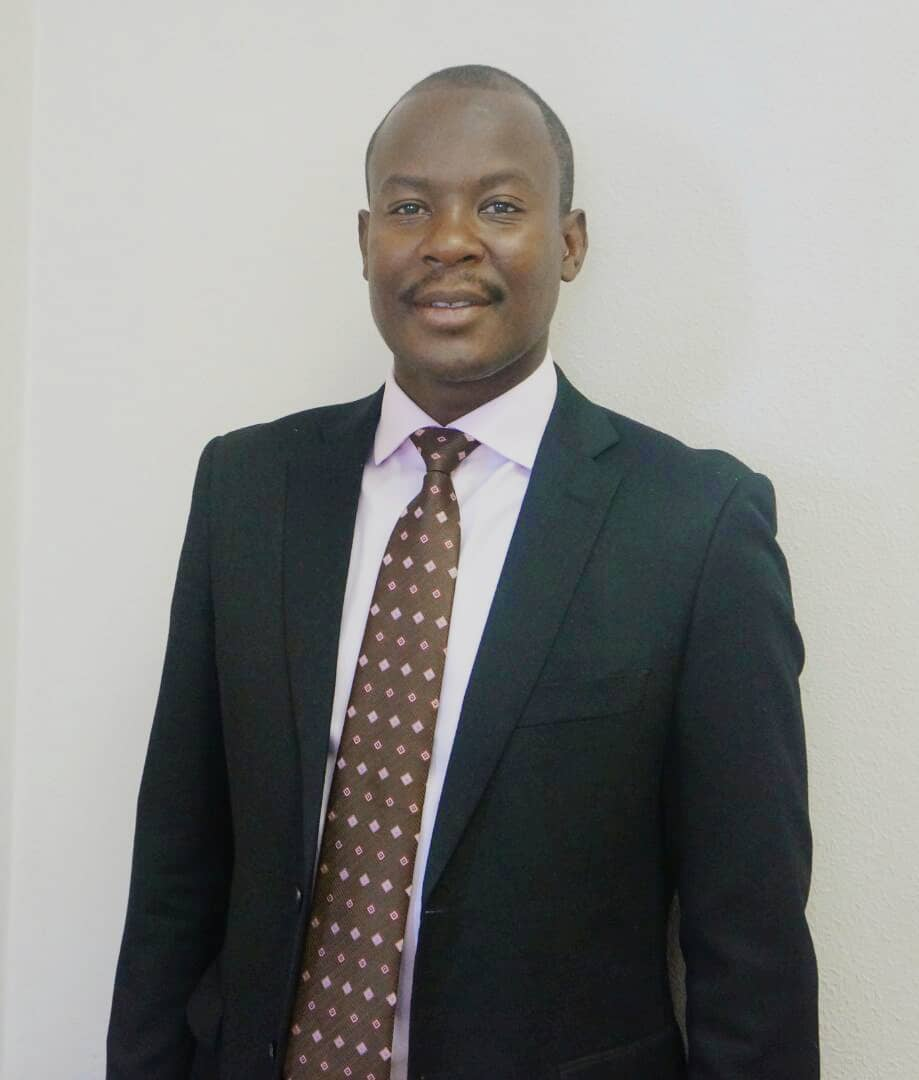
- Muharukua at the Parliament of Namibia in 2019

Member of Parliament of Namibia
- In office 20 March 2015 – 09 April 2024

Governor of Kunene Region
- Incumbent
- Assumed office 28 March 2025
- Preceded by: Marius Sheya

Personal details
- Born: Namibia

Vipuakuje Muharukua is a Namibian politician who is serving as a Governor for Kunene Region since 28 March 2025. He previously served as a legislator in the Parliament of Namibia. He was elected to Parliament on a Popular Democratic Movement ticket in 2014. At 31, he was the second youngest elected MP in Namibia since McHenry Venaani in 2002.

== Early life and political career ==
Muharukua, an ethnic Ovahimba, was born in 1983 in Opuwo in the Kunene Region of north-western Namibia. He was elected to the parliament of Namibia during the 2014 general election, becoming the youngest member of that particular parliament at the time.

== Resignation ==
Muharukua resigned from the party (PDM) and parliament on 9 April 2024, respectively. At the time of resignation he was serving as the Chief Whip of the Popular Democratic Movement.
