= Dâures Constituency =

Electoral constituency in the Erongo region of eastern central Namibia

Coordinates: 21°08′S 14°34′E

Dâures constituency (red) in the Erongo Region

Dâures (Khoekhoe: Brandberg, until 1998: Brandberg Constituency) is a constituency in the Erongo Region of Namibia. It is named after the tallest mountain in Namibia, the Brandberg. It had a population of 11,350 in 2011, an increase from 10,289 in 2001. As of 2020 the constituency had 7,882 registered voters.

Dâures Constituency covers 17,786.6 km^{2} (6,867.4 sq mi) of land. It extends from the national road B2 to the Ugab River and has a radius of approximately 120 km. Largest settlement in the constituency and seat of the constituency office is Uis. It also contains the settlements of Okombahe and Omatjette, as well as the smaller populated places of Grootspitzkop, Odama, Omihana, Okamapuku, Otjohorongo, Ovitua, Ozondati and Tubusis.

== Politics ==
Dâures has been a United Democratic Front (UDF) dominated constituency since its establishment in 1992. In the 2004 regional election UDF politician Apius Auchab received 1,882 of the 3,445 votes cast and became councillor. Only in the 2010 regional elections, the South West Africa People's Organization (SWAPO) took the lead for the first time with Ernst Katjiku getting 1,394 votes, 23 more votes than Auchab of the UDF (1,371 votes). Fredrika Gertze of the National Unity Democratic Organisation received 207 votes and Seth Angalie Manga of the Rally for Democracy and Progress received 195 votes.

In the 2015 regional elections the constituency went back to the UDF with Joram Kennedy ǃHaoseb winning 1589 votes against Katjiku's 1390. I was the only constituency won by the UDF in these elections. ǃHaoseb was reelected in the 2020 regional election, winning the constituency with 1,448 votes. SWAPO was again runner-up, its candidate Theresia Inecia Brandt received 1,147 votes. In third place was Abiud Uaja Karongee, an independent candidate. He obtained 481 votes.

== Economy and infrastructure ==
Apart from the B2 on which it borders, Dâures constituency contains only untarred roads. The main economic activity is agriculture.
