= Uniab River =

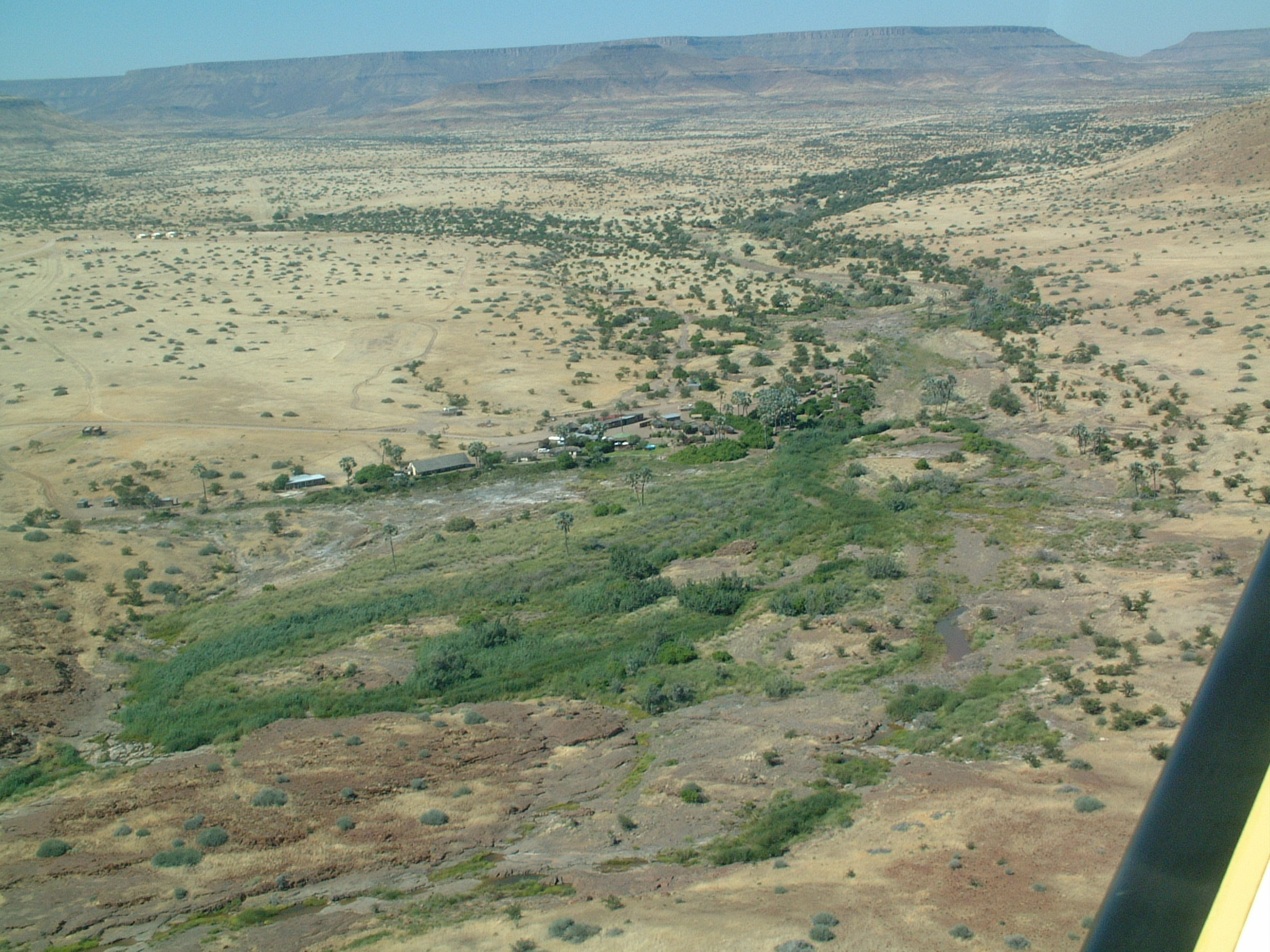
- The Uniab at Palmwag

Physical characteristics
- Source: near Palmwag
  - location: Kunene Region
  - coordinates: 19.8168°S 14.0638°E
- Mouth: Atlantic Ocean
  - coordinates: 20.2015°S 13.1865°E
  - elevation: 0 m (0 ft)
- Length: c.110 km (68 mi)
- Basin size: 4,500 km^{2} (1,700 sq mi)

Basin features
- Tributaries
  - left: Kaikams River
  - right: Kawakab River, Aub River, Urenindes River, Obob River

The Uniab River is an ephemeral river on Namibia's Skeleton Coast, located between Torra Bay and Terrace Bay. Its origin is in the Grootberg Mountains near Palmwag. Inflows of the Uniab are Kaikams, Kawakab, Aub, Urenindes and Obob. The river once created a large river delta with five main watercourses. Today it continues to flow only in one of the watercourses, but subterranean water surfaces as springs in the other channels. Uniab's catchment area (including its tributaries) is estimated to be between 3961 and 4,500 km^{2} (1,700 sq mi).

These springs are a lifeline to the springbok and oryx roaming this desolate stretch of coast and also attract a variety of birds. The river trickles over a waterfall into a narrow gorge through bright reddish-pink sandstone and yellow calcrete formations. The Uniab is a temporary river and is probably best known as desert-adopted elephant country. There is a large animal presence in and around the river including zebra, lion, leopard, black rhino and giraffe.

The river is a tourist attraction owing to its scenic vistas, such as the air views of the Skeleton Coast of Namibia, and the wildlife. The Palmwag Lodge sits on the dry banks of the river and is one of Namibia's oldest tourist destinations.
