= C42 =

C42 or C-42 may refer to:

== Vehicles ==
- Alfa Romeo C42, a Swiss Formula One car
- Douglas C-42, an American military transport aircraft
- Ikarus C42, a German microlight aircraft
- Neiva Regente C-42, a Brazilian military transport aircraft

== Other uses ==
- C42 (TV channel), a former New Zealand television channel
- C42 road (Namibia)
- Caldwell 42, a globular cluster
- City 42, formerly C42, a television channel in Pakistan
- Petrov's Defence, a chess opening
