= Outjo =

Town in Kunene Region, northern Namibia

Outjo Khoekhoe: Tsūob
- Town
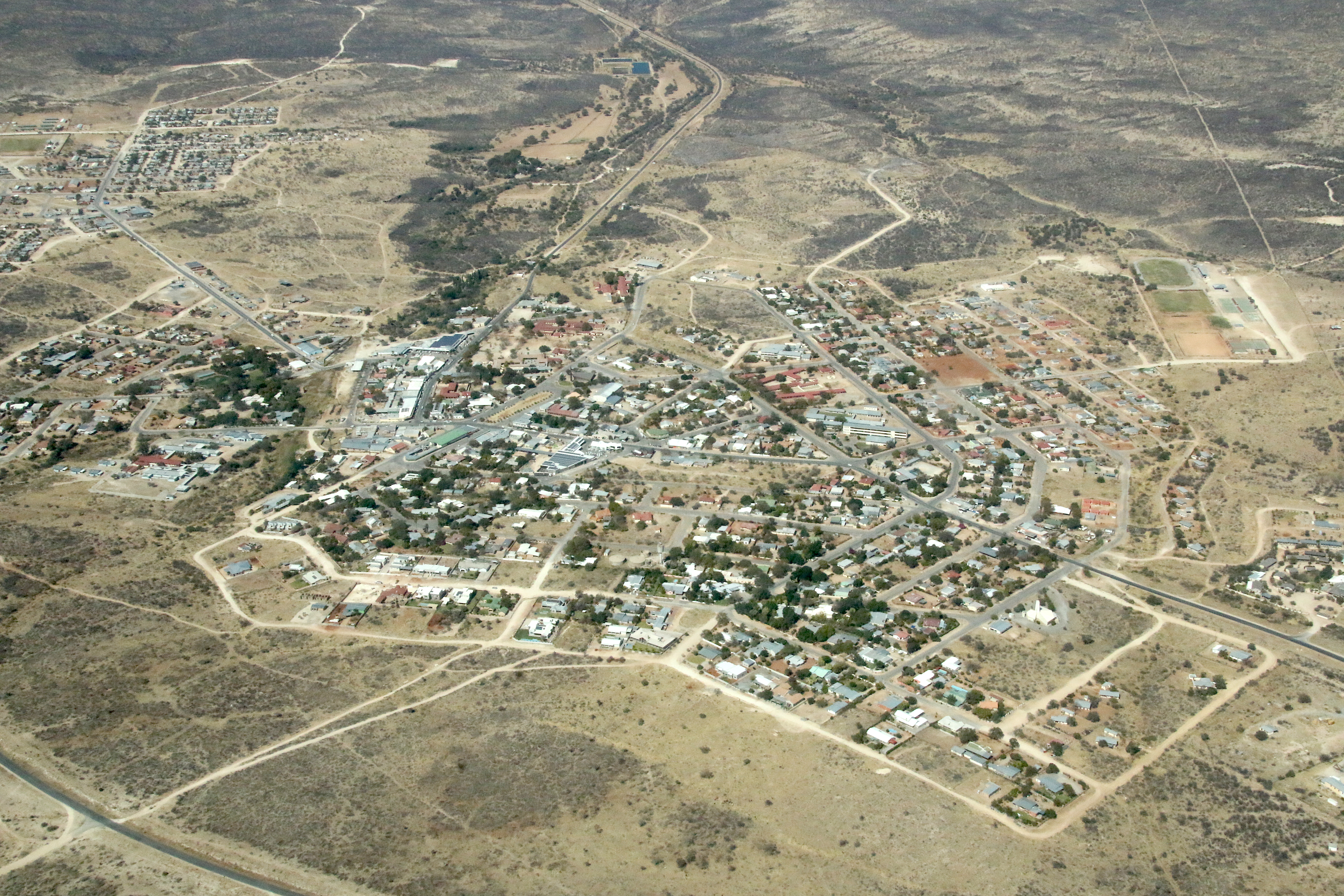
- Aerial view of Outjo (2018)

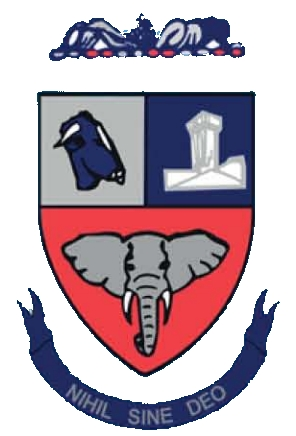
- Seal

- Location in Namibia
- Coordinates: 20°06′32″S 16°09′17″E
- Country: Namibia
- Region: Kunene Region
- Constituency: Outjo Constituency
- Established: 1897

Government
  - Mayor: Bartholomeus Aibeb

Area
  - Total: 97.9 km^{2} (37.8 sq mi)

Population (2023 census)
  - Total: 15,063
- Time zone: UTC+2 (SAST)
- Climate: BSh

Outjo (Otjiherero: small hills) is a town of 15,000 inhabitants in the Kunene Region of Namibia. It is the district capital of Outjo Constituency. It is best known as the main gateway to Etosha National Park.

== Geography ==
Situated on the C38 - 90 kilometres (56 mi) southwest of the Anderson Gate - Outjo is the gateway to the Etosha National Park. Damaraland can be reached by travelling through Outjo on the C39 to Khorixas and the C40 towards Kamanjab leads to the Kaokoveld.

Outjo has an airstrip about 10 kilometres (6.2 mi) out of town that can accommodate small fixed-winged planes. Outjo is the terminus of a branch railway of the Namibian railway system, but there is no railway service at the moment.

South of Outjo is the Ugab River, one of the major rivers of Namibia. The town lies near Gamkarab Cave, known for its stalactites and stalagmites and its pietersite. The caves are on private ground and not open to the public.

== History ==
The town was founded by Germans under the command of Colonel Theodor von Leutwein in 1897 as a small military base in order to explore the northern area of German South West Africa.

Historical population
Year	Pop.	±% p.a.
2001	6,013	—
2011	8,445	+3.45%
2023	15,063	+4.94%

== Politics ==
Outjo is governed by a municipal council that has seven seats.

Since the independence of the country, Outjo is the only small town in the Kunene Region controlled by SWAPO, the national ruling party. The 2015 local authority election was won by SWAPO which gained four seats (1,307 votes). Two seats went to the United Democratic Front (UDF, 706 votes), and the remaining seat was won by the Democratic Turnhalle Alliance (DTA) with 381 votes. SWAPO also won the 2020 local authority election but lost majority control over the municipal council. It obtained 872 votes and three seats. One seat each went to the Landless People's Movement (LPM, a new party registered in 2018, 501 votes), the UDF (392 votes), the Popular Democratic Movement (PDM, the new name of the DTA, 307 votes), and the Monitor Action Group (MAG, 161 votes).

=== Leadership ===
The following people have served as mayors of Outjo:

- Bartholomeus Aibeb (Dec 2025–)

The following people have served as CEO of Outjo:

- Joseph ǀUrib (2000s–August 2023)
- Tjipura Immanuel and Jaco Labuschagne (both acting, rotating every 6 months, 2023–)

== Schools ==
Within the town limits of Outjo are three primary schools and two secondary schools as well as a combined private school.

- Jack Francis Primary School
- Maarssen Primary School
- Outjo Primary School
- Moria Private School
- Etoshapoort Junior Secondary School
- Outjo Secondary School

The following schools are located in the vicinity of the town:

- Otjikondo School Village & Primary School (about 85 kilometers northwest of the city)
- St. Michael Roman-Catholic Primary School (about 70 kilometers northwest of the city)

== Tourist attractions ==
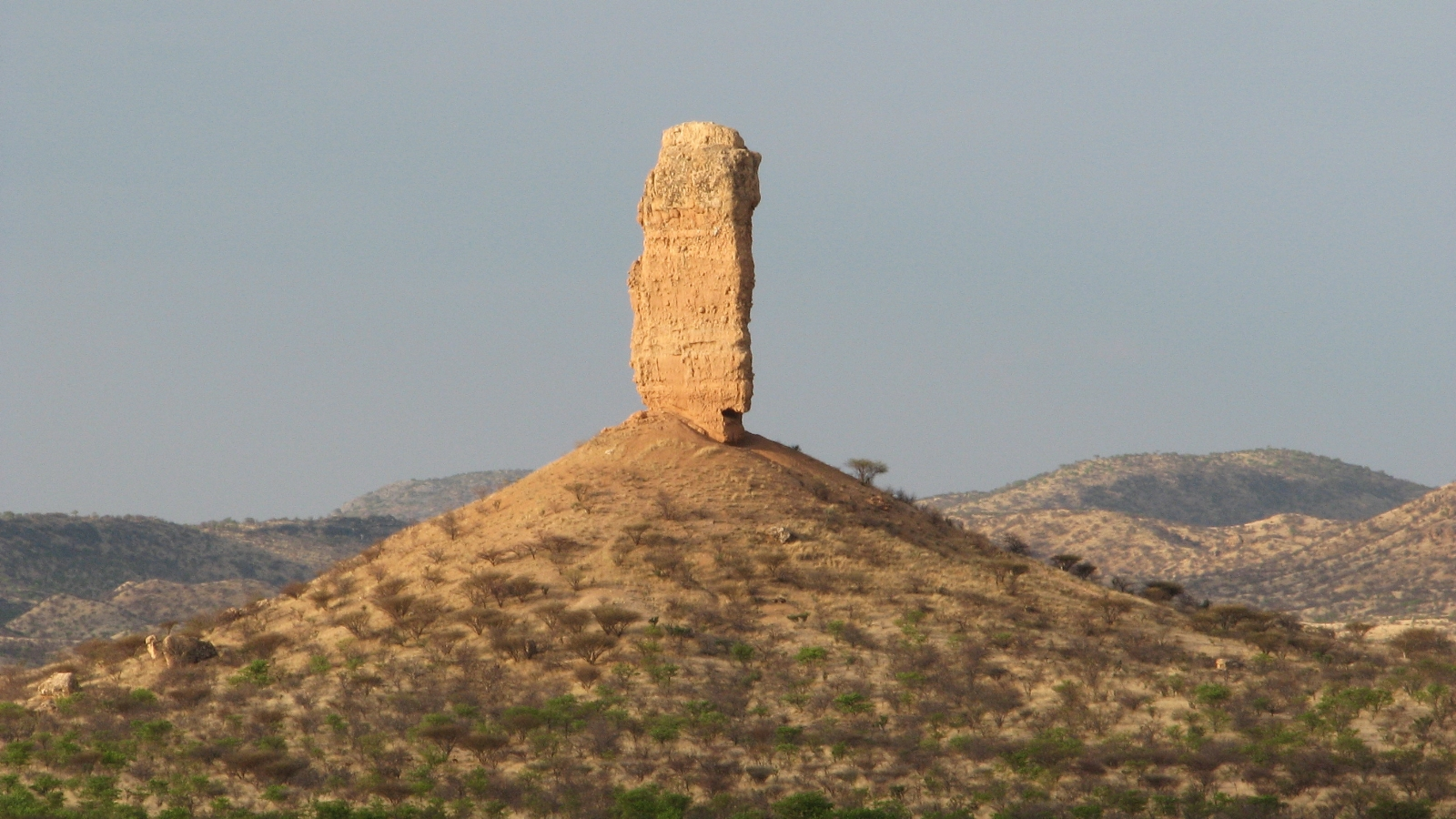
Vingerklip near Outjo

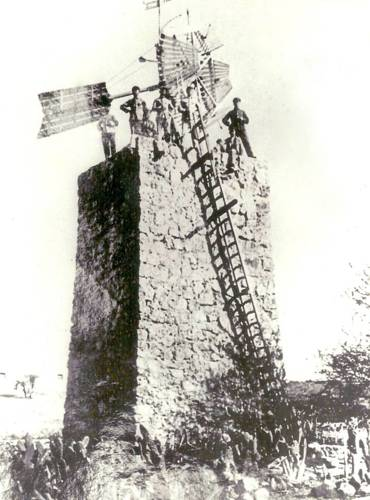
Outjo water tower, erected 1900. Today, only the stone plinth remains.

Outjo offers some sights, but it is above all an important tourist transit and supply point. In 2006, more than 22,000 tourists were counted per month. Attractions in and around Outjo include:

- Franke-Haus-Museum, a local historical museum, details the campaign of Major Viktor Franke in Ovamboland.
- Naulila Monument, commemorating the small expedition on the Portuguese fort of Naulila in Angola by Major Viktor Franke in October 1914 following the massacre of a German delegation which had been sent to negotiate a treaty of non-aggression.
- The Outjo water tower, erected 1900, originally equipped with a wooden wind turbine and used for water extraction.
- Vingerklip, a fingerlike rock formation created through erosion
- Ugab Terraces
- Petrified Forest
- Twyfelfontein
- Burnt Mountain
