= C43 road (Namibia) =

Secondary route in Namibia

C43 road

Major junctions
- North end: Epupa Falls at the Kunene River, Angolan-Namibian border
- C41 Opuwo; C40 at Palmwag
- South end: C39 at Bergsig

Location
- Country: Namibia

Highway system
- Transport in Namibia
← C42	→ C44

The C43 is a secondary route in Namibia that begins in Bergsig, running for 457 kilometres (284 mi) to the Angolan-Namibian border where it terminates at the Epupa Falls.

The C43 starts at Epupa close to the Epupa Falls and leads due south to Okangwati, then south-east to Opuwo, where it crosses the C41. It then leads south again across Joubert Pass, descending from an elevation of 1,436 metres (4,711 ft). While the rest of the C43 has a gravel surface, at the pass there are some paved sections. From there the road passes Sesfontein and the veterinary fence at Palmwag before it terminates at the junction with the C39 from Torra Bay to Khorixas.

The C43 is used by tourists but deteriorates regularly during raining season. Since 2016 there are plans to tar its surface.
