= Hendrik Gaobaeb =

Namibian politician and businessman

- Born: 24 April 1964 (age 62); Sesfontein, South West Africa (today Namibia)
- Political party: UDF

Hendrik Gaobaeb (born 24 April 1964) is a Namibian politician. He is the president of the United Democratic Front since January 2024 and its presidential candidate in the 2024 Namibian general election.

Gaobaeb is a member of the United Democratic Front (UDF) since 1980. He holds a National Diploma in Public Administration from the Polytechnic of Namibia (today Namibia University of Science and Technology). From 1996 to 2004 he was CEO of Khorixas.

Gaobaeb won the 2004 regional election for UDF in Sesfontein Constituency. He was reelected in the 2010 regional election. In this second term as constituency councillor he was elected regional councillor and represented Kunene Region in the National Council. In the 2015 regional election Gaobaeb lost Sesfontein constituency to Julius Koujova of SWAPO. In the 2020 regional election he again became councillor.

In January 2024 Gaobaeb became president of the UDF at its elective congress. He subsequently was nominated presidential candidate for the 2024 presidential election.
