= C39 road (Namibia) =

Road in Namibia

C39 road

Major junctions
- East end: C34 at Torra Bay
- C43 to Palmwag; C35 near Khorixas; C38 in Outjo
- West end: B1 and B6 in Otavi

Location
- Country: Namibia

Highway system
- Transport in Namibia
← C38	→ C40

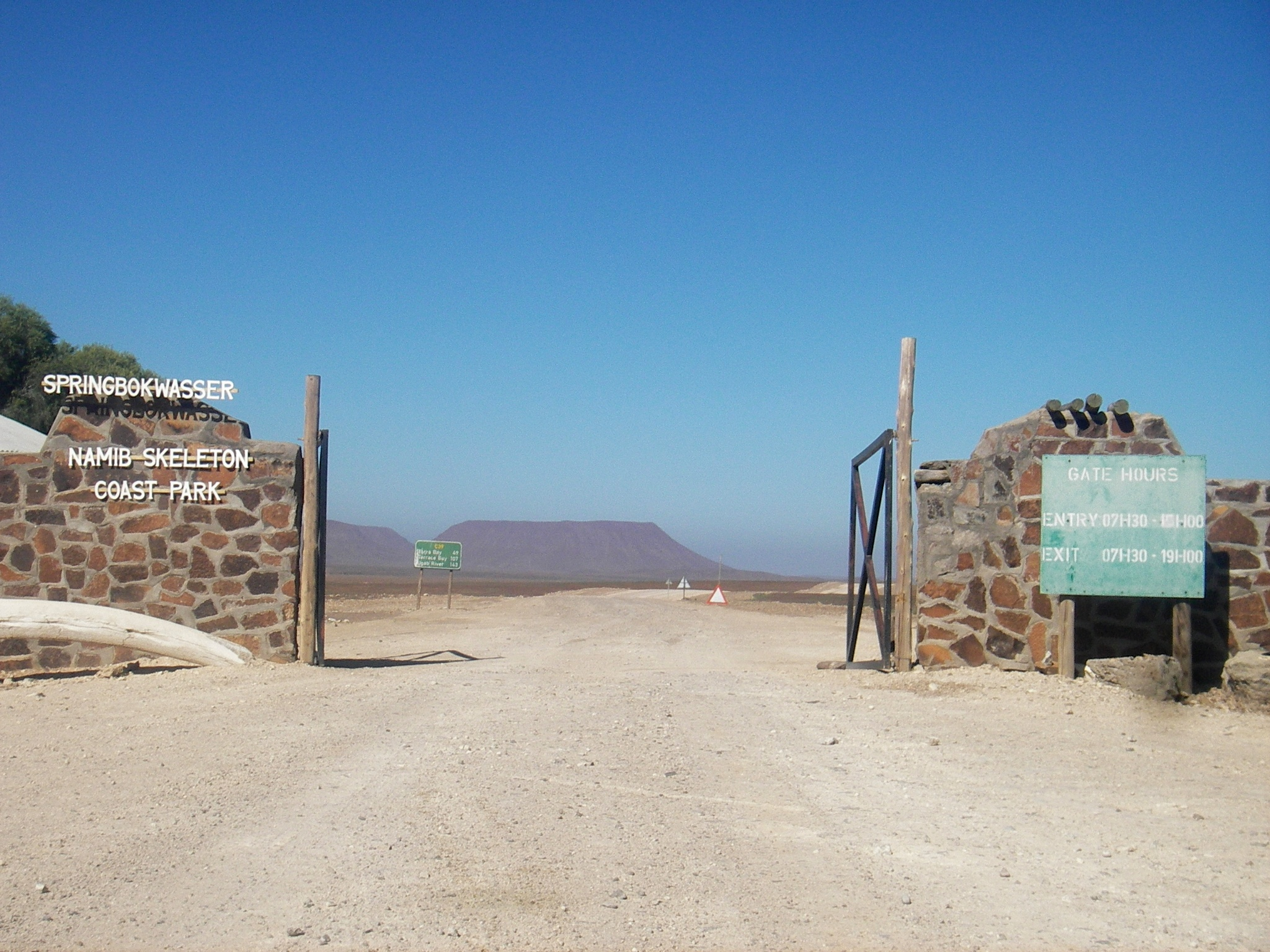
The road at Springbokwasser Gate, entrance to the Skeleton Coast National Park

C39 is a secondary road in central Namibia. It is 494 kilometres (307 mi) long and connects Torra Bay on the Atlantic Ocean via Khorixas and Outjo to Otavi in central Namibia.

The C39 starts at the terminus of the C34 at Torra Bay in the Skeleton Coast National Park. It leads in eastern direction to Khorixas where it crosses the C35. It then leads further eastwards to Outjo where it crosses the C38, and to Otavi, where it connects to the national roads B1 and B6.

Between Khorixas and Outjo this road bore the designation MR 64. It is tarred on this section, the various culverts and bridges over minor rivers in this section were built in 1962 and 1963.
