= C38 road (Namibia) =

Road in Namibia

C38 road

Major junctions
- South end: B1 / C33 in Otjiwarongo
- C39 in Outjo; C40 north of Outjo
- North end: B1 south of Oshivelo

Location
- Country: Namibia

Highway system
- Transport in Namibia
← C37	→ C39

The C38 is a secondary route in central Namibia. It is 335 kilometres (208 mi) long, leading from Otjiwarongo via Outjo to Oshivelo. It leads through the Etosha National Park; Drivers need a permit for this section.

The C38 is tarred between Otjiwarongo and Okaukuejo, and between Namutoni and the B1 near Oshivelo. The section between Otjiwarongo and Outjo is the oldest part of this road. It was designated trunk road TR 2/5 and already existed in the 1940s. On this section the road crosses various rivers, among them the Ugab as well as the Otjiwarongo-Outjo railway line. The respective slabs and bridges were built between 1944 and 1969.
