= C40 road (Namibia) =

Road in Namibia

C40 road

Major junctions
- East end: C38 near Outjo
- C35 in Kamanjab
- West end: C43 at Palmwag

Location
- Country: Namibia

Highway system
- Transport in Namibia
← C39	→ C41

The C40 is a secondary route in central Namibia. It is 259 kilometres (161 mi) long, leading from Outjo via Kamanjab to Palmwag.

The C40 is tarred between Outjo and Kamanjab. Between Kamanjab and Palmwag is Grootberg Pass at 1,629 metres (5,344 ft) elevation. Here the road conditions are often poor, for tourists a 4x4 is recommended.
