= Otuani =

Town in Kunene Region, Namibia

Coordinates: 18°34′S 13°41′E

Otuani is a settlement in the Kunene region of Namibia, situated 70 kilometres (43 mi) southwest of the regional capital Opuwo. Since the creation of the Opuwo Rural constituency in August 2013, Otuani is its administrative centre, although it is located far away from major roads. The constituency office is expected to be completed in March 2017.

Otuani features a small clinic that was completed in 2011 but remained closed for a number of years due to lack of water. The Otuani Copper Mine is situated 4 kilometres (2.5 mi) outside the village.
