= Fransfontein =

Settlement in Kunene Region, Namibia

- Settlement
- Location in Namibia
- Coordinates: 20°13′S 15°1′E
- Country: Namibia
- Region: Kunene Region
- Constituency: Khorixas

Population (2011)
  - Total: 533
- Time zone: UTC+2 (CAT)
- Climate: BWh

Fransfontein (Afrikaans: Frans' spring) is a settlement in the Kunene Region of Namibia. It had 533 inhabitants in 2011. In 2007 Fransfontein was proclaimed a settlement with an area of 244 ha (603 acres).

Fransfontein belongs to the Khorixas electoral constituency. It is the hometown of former Deputy-Prime Minister of Namibia Libertina Amathila.

== History ==
The settlement is named after Frans Fredrick of the ǁKhauǀgoan (Swartbooi Nama) who was on an exploration mission to find suitable land to settle. He found the spring which is still the main water supply of the village today.

In 1880 people settled in this area. In 1891 a Rhenish mission station was founded. After the proclamations of land confiscation following the end of the Herero Wars in 1904, land in the area was set aside for the Swartbooi Nama clan. Fransfontein is still the main settlement of the clan and houses its current traditional leadership authority, the Swartbooi Traditional Authority.
