= C4S =

C4S may refer to:

- C4S (gene), a gene variant for encoding the protein complement component 4
- Clips4Sale, adult video site
- SAP Cloud for Services (C4S), an application in the SAP CRM product line
- Menasco C-4S, an aero engine
- Porsche C4S, a variant of the Porsche 911 (993)
- Porsche C4S, a variant of the Porsche 911 (996)
- command, control, communications, computers, and, surveillance (C4S), a variant of command and control

== See also ==
- C4SS
- C4 (disambiguation) for the singular of C4s
- C45 (disambiguation)
