= Ngohauvi Lydia Kavetu =

Namibian politician

Ngohauvi Lydia Kavetu (born 3 July 1965 in Omao, Kunene Region) is a Namibian politician. A member of the Democratic Turnhalle Alliance (DTA), Kavetu was a member of the National Council of Namibia from 2004 until 2010.

== Political career ==
Prior to entering national politics, Kavetu was a member of the town council of Opuwo from 1998 to 2004. From 2004 until 2010, she represented Opuwo Constituency in the Kunene Regional Council, and was chosen as the DTA's only member of the 3rd National Council, serving in the upper chamber of the Parliament of Namibia from 2004 until 2010.
