= C36 road (Namibia) =

Road in Namibia

C36 road

Major junctions
- South-East end: B2 in Wilhelmstal
- C33 south of Omaruru
- North-West end: C35 in Uis

Location
- Country: Namibia

Highway system
- Transport in Namibia
← C35	→ C37

The C36 is a secondary route in the Erongo Region of central Namibia. It runs from Wilhelmstal via Omaruru to Uis and is 196 kilometres (122 mi) long. Before the designation as a C road, the section between Wilhelmstal and Omaruru was the trunk road TR 7/2, and the section between Omaruru and Uis was the main road MR 64.

The C36 branches off the B2 at Wilhelmstal and leads in north-eastern direction to Omaruru where it cojoins the C33. It then leads through Omaruru and proceeds eastwards to Uis, where it joins the C35. The C36 is unpaved except for 5 kilometres (3.1 mi) outside Uis, and where it runs along the tarred C33 in and around Omaruru.

The C36 crosses the Khan River 23 kilometres (14 mi) north-east of Wilhelmstal. The bridge was built in 1968. It also crosses several smaller riverbeds, the respective bridges were built between 1967 and 1975.
