= C46 road (Namibia) =

Secondary route in Namibia

C46 road

Major junctions
- East end: B1 in Ondangwa
- C41 / C45 in Oshakati
- West end: C35 in Ruacana

Location
- Country: Namibia
- Towns: Outapi, Oshikuku

Highway system
- Transport in Namibia
← C45	→ C47

The C46 is a tarred secondary route in northern Namibia that runs from Ruacana via Outapi, Oshikuku and Oshakati to Ondangwa. It is 188 kilometres (117 mi) long.
