= Jhonny Haikella Hakaye =

Namibian politician (born 1958)

- Born: 8 March 1958 (age 67); Ondudu
- Occupation: Politician
- Known for: Member of the South West Africa People's Organization (SWAPO)
- Spouse: Hilya Shipombo-Hakaye

Jhonny Haikella Hakaye (born 8 March 1958 in Ondudu, Omusati Region) is a Namibian politician. A member of the South West Africa People's Organization (SWAPO), Hakaye served as a member of the National Council for Omusati Region from 1993 to 2010, and as the regional councillor for Okalongo Constituency during the same period. He was also the Chief Whip for SWAPO in the National Council and a member of the Commonwealth Parliamentary Association Namibia Branch.

== Education and career ==
Hakaye completed his primary education at Okalongo Junior Primary School and Onandjaba in the Omusati Region from 1967 to 1972, followed by junior secondary school in Okalongo (1973–1975) and secondary education at Outapi Senior Secondary School, Ombalantu, which he completed in 1976.

Following graduation, Hakaye fled into exile to join SWAPO in Lubango, Angola, where he became a Chief Political Commissar for the People's Liberation Army of Namibia (PLAN) from 1977 to 1980. In 1980, Hakaye moved to Lusaka, Zambia, and studied at the United Nations Institute for Namibia (UNIN), graduating with a diploma in 1982. From 1982 to 1984, he worked as an administrator and youth leader at SWAPO’s health center in Nyango. In 1984, he relocated to Tashkent, Uzbekistan (then part of the Soviet Union) to study youth leadership and international relations at Komsomolskya High School. He obtained a diploma in international relations/diplomacy and youth leadership in 1985.

=== Political career ===
After returning to Africa, Hakaye served as SWAPO Youth League representative for Eastern, Central, and Southern Africa from 1988 to 1991, and as district coordinator for SWAPO in Okalongo from 1991 to 1993.

In 1993, he was elected regional councillor for Okalongo Constituency and subsequently became a member of the National Council representing the Omusati Region, a position he held until 2010.
