= Otjomotjira =

Settlement in the Kunene Region, Namibia

Otjomotjira is a settlement in the Kunene Region of north-western Namibia. It consists of about 70 households of Ovahimba people, a nomadic tribe that lives almost totally isolated from modern society. The village does not have any facilities, the next shop is a three-day walk away.
