= Ondudu =

Populated place in Omusati Region, Namibia

- Location in Namibia
- Coordinates: 17°24′18″S 15°17′35″E
- Country: Namibia
- Region: Omusati Region
- Time zone: UTC+2 (SAST)
- Climate: BSh

Ondudu is a populated place in Omusati Region of Namibia, near the border with Angola. It belongs to the Okalongo electoral constituency. Together with Onandjaba, Onembaba, and Omutundungu, it is under the jurisdiction of the Okalongo customary court.

The Namibian politician Jhonny Haikella Hakaye was born here in 1958.
