= Okalongo =

Okalongo Okalongo kaHaudano
- Settlement
- Location within Namibia
- Coordinates: 17°26′S 15°20′E
- Country: Namibia
- Region: Omusati
- Constituency: Okalongo
- Time zone: UTC+2 (SAST)

Okalongo is a settlement in the Omusati Region of northern Namibia, situated 35 kilometres (22 mi) from Outapi. It is the district capital of the Okalongo Constituency. Okalongo is a constituency in the Omusati Region, and the capital is Onandjaba. It is under the administration of Onandjaba Village Council and the Ombadja traditional authorities, all seated in Onandjaba. Okalongo and the surrounding area is inhabited by the Ovambadja tribe of the Ovambo people, whose artificial borders cut/divvied them in half into southern Angola and northern Namibia during the scramble of Africa in the early 18th century and early 19th century. It is situated in the north of Namibia in the area known as Ovamboland. Okalongo is one of the places that suffered a lot during the colonial era. In 1983, the South African forces established a military base in Okalongo in Onandjaba village.

In 2025, the settlement status of Okalongo was withdrawn, and at the same time the status of a village was given to Onandjaba, which is the center of the Okalongo settlement.

Okalongo is home to the Okalongo Traditional Authority, a tribal administrative division of the Ovambo people.
