= Opuwo Urban =

Electoral constituency in the Kunene region of north-western Namibia

Opuwo Urban (red) in the Kunene Region of Namibia

Opuwo Urban is a constituency in the Kunene Region of Namibia. It comprises the townlands of Opuwo, which is also its administrative centre. As of 2020, it has 10,590 registered voters.

Opuwo Urban was created in August 2013. Following a recommendation of the Fourth Delimitation Commission of Namibia, and in preparation of the 2014 general election, the old Opuwo Constituency was split into Opuwo Urban and Opuwo Rural.

== Politics ==
The 2015 regional election was narrowly won by Weich Muypa of the SWAPO Party with 2,431 votes. Ueutjerevi Ngunaihe of the Democratic Turnhalle Alliance (DTA) came second with 2,396 votes. Inyandisa Kavari of the National Unity Democratic Organisation (NUDO) also ran and finished with 264 votes. In the 2020 regional election, Ngunaihe of the Popular Democratic Movement (PDM, the new name of the DTA) won with 2,611 votes. The sitting SWAPO councillor Mupya came second with 1,723 votes.
