= Sesfontein =

Sesfontein Khoekhoe: ǃNaniǀaudi
- Settlement
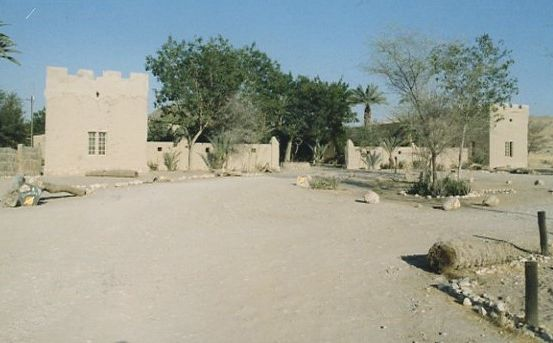
- The reconstructed Fort Sesfontein in 2014

- Location in Namibia
- Coordinates: 19°8′S 13°37′E
- Country: Namibia
- Region: Kunene Region
- Constituency: Sesfontein Constituency
- Proclaimed: 2005
- Time zone: UTC+02:00 (Central Africa Time)
- Climate: BWh

Sesfontein is a settlement in the Kunene Region of Namibia, situated 150 km (93 mi) from the regional capital Opuwo. It was proclaimed in 2005 and is administered by the Kunene Regional Council. Sesfontein is also the seat of the Sesfontein Constituency office. It features a clinic and school.

== History ==
Sesfontein derives its name from the six fountains which have their source in the vicinity. The most well known landmark of Sesfontein is Fort Sesfontein, erected in 1896 as a police outpost by Schutztruppe soldiers of Imperial Germany to control the movement of cattle after a rinderpest epidemic. The palm trees at the fort were planted by the German police officers who manned the fort to combat weapons smuggling and elephant and rhino poaching.

Due to its remote location, the fort was abandoned by the Germans in 1914 following the start of the First World War and fell into disrepair soon thereafter. When South Africa took over administration of South West Africa, they zoned Sesfontein as a Nama reserve, relying on previous German legislation. The fort was considered a prospective National Monument in 1984 it was decided in 1989 not to list it. The fort was reconstructed in the 1990s and is now equipped to accommodate tourists. Three graves are located there for a soldier that died during construction, a soldier that died of illness and a trader.

== Politics ==
Hendrik Gaobaeb, president of the United Democratic Front, was born in Sesfontein. It is historically considered a political stronghold for the UDF.
