= Themistokles Dudu Murorua =

Namibian politician

Themistokles Dudu Murorua (born 27 August 1958 in Okahandja, Otjozondjupa Region) is a Namibian politician. A member of the United Democratic Front, Murorua has been the governor of the Kunene Region since 2005. From 1999 to 2005, Murorua was a member of the National Council of Namibia and at the time the only UDF member of that body. He represented the Kamanjab Constituency. For the 2019 parliamentary election Murorua was placed second on UDF's party list. As the party gained two seats in that election he joined the National Assembly of Namibia in March 2020.

Murorua is a Certified Public Accountant by profession, but has also worked with numerous wildlife organisations, including the Save the Rhino Trust.

== Same-sex marriage ==
In 2003, as a member of the National Council, Murorua was shouted down by ruling SWAPO members for suggesting that same-sex couples in Namibia should be included in legislation that fights domestic violence.
