= Outjo Constituency =

Electoral constituency in the Kunene region of north-western Namibia

Coordinates: 20°7′S 16°9′E

Outjo constituency (red) in the Kunene Region of Namibia

Outjo is an electoral constituency in the Kunene Region of Namibia. Its district capital is the town of Outjo, its population was 8,947 in 2004. As of 2020, it has 9,197 registered voters.

== Politics ==
The 2004 regional election was won by Thomas Adam Sheya of the SWAPO Party with 1,493 of the 3,706 votes cast. It was the only constituency in Kunene that did not go to the opposition.

The 2015 regional election was won by Johannes Antsino (SWAPO) with 1,774 votes, followed by Magrietha Peter of the United Democratic Front (UDF) with 1,063 votes. Independent candidate Uaundja Mazenge finished third with 355 votes, followed by John Kelly of the Democratic Turnhalle Alliance (DTA) with 273 votes and Ismael Frans of the Rally for Democracy and Progress (RDP) with 87 votes. Antsino was re-elected in the 2020 regional election, again the only constituency in Kunene that SWAPO won. He received 1,059 votes. The independent Mazenge came second with 560 votes, followed by Willibard Jason (UDF, 539 votes), Elfriede Gaeses of the Landless People's Movement (LPM, a new party registered in 2018, 407 votes) and Kaejarukapo Maekopo of the Popular Democratic Movement (PDM, the new name of the DTA) with 369 votes.

== See also ==
- Administrative divisions of Namibia
