= Hafeni Ndemula =

Namibian politician and trade unionist

Hafeni Ludwig Ndemula (born 10 October 1962 in Walvis Bay) is a Namibian politician and trade unionist. A member of the South West Africa People's Organization, Ndemula rose to prominence in the National Union of Namibian Workers (NUNW) prior to independence. As the elected councillor of the Walvis Bay Urban constituency he was appointed to the National Council in 2001 prior to election and re-elected in 2004. Ndemula was reelected as constituency councillor in the 2010 and 2015 regional elections.
