= C44 road (Namibia) =

Secondary route in Namibia

C44 road

Major junctions
- Northwest end: B8 north of Grootfontein
- M74 to Dobe
- Southeast end: D3303 at Gam

Location
- Country: Namibia
- Towns: Tsumkwe

Highway system
- Transport in Namibia
← C43	→ C45

The C44 is a gravel road in the Otjozondjupa Region of central Namibia. Its north-western terminus is at the B8 57 km (35 mi) north of Grootfontein. The C44 is 321 kilometres (199 mi) long and runs through Tsumkwe to Gam. It provides access to the Khaudom National Park via the D3315 turnoff in Tsumkwe, and to the Dobe border post with Botswana via the M74 east of Tsumkwe.

A feasibility study to upgrade this road to bitumen was conducted in 2019/20. It came to the conclusion that tarring this road would not be viable due to its low traffic volume.
