= Okaku Constituency =

Electoral constituency in the Oshana region of northern Namibia

Coordinates: 17°48′S 15°51′E

Okaku Constituency (red) in the Oshana Region

Okaku Constituency is an electoral constituency in the Oshana Region of Namibia. It had 10,384 registered voters in 2020. Its district capital is the settlement of Okaku. Okaku Constituency covers an area of 224 km^{2} (86 sq mi). It had a population of 19,007 in 2011, down from 20,354 in 2001. Okaku falls under the Ondonga Traditional Authority.

Okaku residents depend on farming. They cultivate their fields on a subsistence basis to get food such as millet, beans, melons, sorghum and nuts. Their staple is porridge (oshithima), and their traditional drink is ontaku.

== Politics ==
Okaku constituency is traditionally a stronghold of the South West Africa People's Organization (SWAPO) party. Its first councillor is Henock ya Kasita who served the constituency from Namibian independence until 2010. In the 2004 regional election he received 5,538 of the 5,672 votes cast. Ya Kasita was followed by Joseph Kapya Endjala who was the head of Cosdec centre in Ondangwa.

In the 2015 local and regional elections the SWAPO candidate won uncontested and became councillor after no opposition party nominated a candidate. The SWAPO candidate won the 2020 regional election by a large margin. Gerson Kapenda obtained 3,261 votes, followed by Foibe Nashongo of the Independent Patriots for Change (IPC), an opposition party formed in August 2020, with 970 votes. The current Okaku constituency councilor is Ester Fillemon.

== Education ==
Schools in the constituency include Oshikondiilongo Combined School, Otala Combined School, Okaku Primary School, Ankambo Primary School, Nengushe Secondary School, Eloolo Combined School, Onyeka Combined School, Iindangungu Combined School and Ontinda Primary School.

== Development ==
Okaku constituency has four Evangelical Lutheran Church in Namibia (ELCIN) parishes, one Evangelical and one Catholic parish. It has two clinics, one named after the constituency and the other one at Eloolo near the church. Most of the infrastructure in Okaku has electricity through the Ministry of Mines and Energy's Rural Electrification Programme.

Except for the main roads between Oshakati and Ondangwa and between Ondangwa and Oshikango, most of the roads in the constituency are gravel. The communication network is available in the area. Residents do their shopping in Ondangwa and Oshakati.

As one of the constituencies in the flood prone area, Okaku suffered from the flood during the rainy season. The road between Ondangwa and the T-junction on the way to Oshakati was under flood water in 2009. A number of schools cannot be reached during the rainy season. Okaku has a gravel road from Okapya to Ongha via Onanime.

== Notes ==
- Shivute, O (27 February 2009): "Okaku prone to flood." The Namibian, p.6
- W.J Mbangula (2011): "Okaku hungry for development." New Era p.2
