= C33 road (Namibia) =

Secondary road in Namibia

C33 road

Major junctions
- Southwest end: B2 east of Karibib
- C36 Omaruru; MR63 north of Kalkfeld
- Northeast end: C38 Otjiwarongo

Location
- Country: Namibia

Highway system
- Transport in Namibia
← C32	→ C34

The C33 (old designation: trunk road TR 2/4) is a tarred road in central Namibia, leading from Karibib via Omaruru and Kalkfeld to Otjiwarongo. It is 196 kilometres (122 mi) long.

The C33 crosses the Kranzberg–Otavi railway line, as well as several small riverbeds. The respective bridges were built between the 1950s and the 1970s.
