= C45 =

C45 or C-45 may refer to:

- Beech C-45 Expeditor, an American military transport aircraft
- C4.5 algorithm, used to generate a decision tree
- C45 road (Namibia)
- Caldwell 45, a spiral galaxy
- Cannabis Act introduced as Bill C-45 to the Parliament of Canada
- EADS/Northrop Grumman KC-45, a cancelled air refueling aircraft for the US Air Force
- Kick Sauber C45, a car competing in the 2025 Formula One World Championship
- Scotch Game, a chess opening
- Underground Work (Women) Convention, 1935 of the International Labour Organization
- Ursus C-45, a Polish tractor
- C45, a variant of Claridge Hi-Tec/Goncz Pistol rifle
- C45, a 45-minute audio Compact Cassette tape
- C45 Scaphandre Autonome, vintage scuba equipment
