= C47 road (Namibia) =

Secondary route in Namibia

C47 road

Major junctions
- North-East end: C42 Okatjoruu
- B14 at Coblenz
- South-West end: C22 Okakarara

Location
- Country: Namibia

Highway system
- Transport in Namibia
| ← C46 | → C48 |

The C47 is an untarred road in the Otjozondjupa Region of central Namibia that runs from Okakarara to Okatjoruu. It is 168 kilometres (104 mi) long.
