= C34 road (Namibia) =

Road in Namibia

C34 road

Major junctions
- South end: B2 in Swakopmund
- C35 north of Henties Bay
- North end: C39 southeast of Torra Bay

Location
- Country: Namibia

Highway system
- Transport in Namibia
← C33	→ C35

The C34 (old designation: main road MR 44) is a secondary route on Namibia's Atlantic coast. It is 300 kilometres (190 mi) long, leading from Swakopmund via Henties Bay to Torra Bay.

The road surface of the C34 consists of a sand-salt mixture. In 2019 the C34 was tarred between Swakopmund and Henties Bay. The C34 crosses the Omaruru River north of Henties Bay. The bridge was built in 1980 and renovated in 2019.
