= Uis =

- Settlement
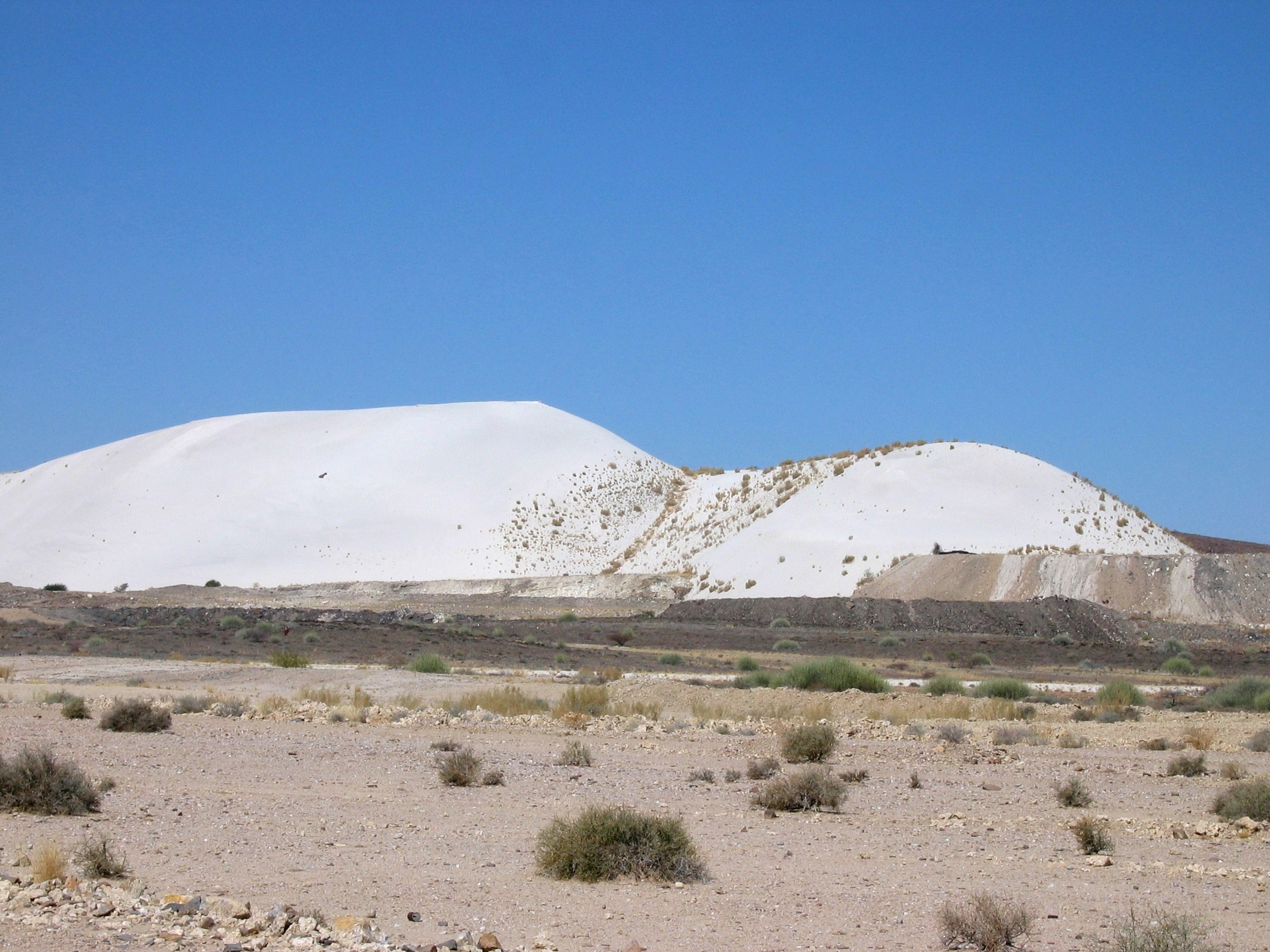
- Mine Spoils

- Location in Namibia
- Coordinates: 21°13′7″S 14°52′3″E
- Country: Namibia
- Region: Erongo Region
- Constituency: Dâures Constituency
- Established: 1958

Population (2010)
  - Total: ca. 3,600
- Time zone: UTC+2 (South African Standard Time)

Uis is a settlement in the Erongo Region of eastern central Namibia. It belongs to the Dâures electoral constituency. Located in the former Damaraland, it is known for the local mineral wealth. The settlement was established in 1958 as workers' settlement to exploit local tin deposits. It has approximately 3,600 inhabitants and, before being downgraded from "village" to "settlement" in 2010, owned 10 square kilometres (3.9 sq mi) of land.

Uis is located at the foot of the Brandberg, Namibia's highest mountain. The Brandberg is home to the world famous The White Lady rock painting, said by some to be over 20,000 years old. Being also situated on the C36, the main road between the coast and the Damaraland interior, there is a reasonable amount of traffic, by far the main source of economic activity in Uis. The settlement holds a small supermarket, guesthouses and a restcamp, a bakery and a petrol station, together with a few other small shops. The ephemeral Uis River, a tributary to the Ugab River, passes the settlement.

Uis is home to the Brandberg Primary School and Petrus ǃGaneb Secondary School, both for about 300 learners. Petrus Ganeb SS was built before Namibian independence; its facilities are old and dilapidated.

== Mining ==
Tin has been mined in the Uis region since 1922. Uis Tin Mining Company was established in 1951 and a settlement was developed in 1958 to house the mine workers when ISCOR, a South African mining company, started operations there and increased production. However, the ore grade at Uis is very low, and the mine - at its time the largest open-cast tin mine in the world - was viable only because South Africa, to which the territory was mandated, was economically isolated and could not buy tin on the world market. When apartheid was abolished and international sanctions were lifted the mine was no longer competitive. In 1991, the main mining operations closed down because the price of tin dropped far enough to make it un-economical.

There was still minimal activities on the mine site. Technology had improved enough to make it worthwhile to re-process the already excavated ore that was originally discarded and there is a re-processing plant located near the old mine dumps. This ore is processed to an enriched state and then taken to Walvis Bay for export. After 2010 new investments enabled work to start again at the old mine. Today successful production is dependent on a high world market price.

Uis mine and the surrounding settlement are situated on the farm Uis Townlands No. 215 and in private ownership today. The white mine spoils are visible from afar. Since 1995 Namib Base Minerals Pty Ltd is the owner, after a subsidiary of ISCOR sold it.

Uis still produces rare rocks and minerals. Namibia is well known as a mineral rich country and geologists come from all over the world to study in Namibia because much of the interesting geology and rare rocks are situated at ground level rather than high up on mountains or deep underground.

10 km (6.2 mi) south of Uis is Three Aloes mine, Namibia's largest tantalite producer.

== Politics ==
Upon independence of Namibia Uis was a village, governed by a seven-seat village council. The area traditionally supports the opposition United Democratic Front (UDF).

The 1992 Namibian local elections was comfortably won by the UDF which gained 402 votes and five seats. One seat each was won by SWAPO (77 votes) and the Democratic Turnhalle Alliance (DTA, 46 votes). The 1998 local authority elections saw a similar result. The UDF again gained five seats (219 votes), DTA (62 votes) and SWAPO (59 votes) got one seat each.

In 2010 it was downgraded to "settlement" status because of low economic activity, in particular due to ceasing mining operations and subsequent dwindling economic activities in the settlement. It hence lost its self-governing village council and came under the governance of the Erongo Regional Council. From that time, Uis was in danger of becoming a ghost town.

After mining operations resumed again, it is planned to upgrade Uis' status to town.
