= Vingerklip =

Rock in Namibia

Coordinates: 20.3828°S 15.4339°E

The Vingerklip (Afrikaans for "Rock Finger"), a rock needle built up from sedimentary rock layers dating from the Tertiary period, is situated about 80 km southwest of the town of Outjo and approx. 50 km east of the city of Khorixas in northwestern Namibia. This rock formation is an erosion residue, a kind of mini-witness mountain of a layer level that extends further east parallel to and north of the Ugab. This layer level, like the rock finger, consists of deposits from the Tertiary forerunners of the Ugab river system and tower over the recent valley of the Ugab by up to 160 meters. These deposits are predominantly carbonated sandstones and conglomerates.

The tip of this rock formation is 929 m above sea level, the rock itself is about 35 meters high and has a circumference of 44 meters at its base. In addition to the rock finger, there are some other, in some cases much larger, erosion residues in this area - “real” witness mountains in the form of table mountains.

Since the collapse of Mukurob in the South of Namibia, this geological formation has been the most famous rock in Namibia.

== Gallery ==
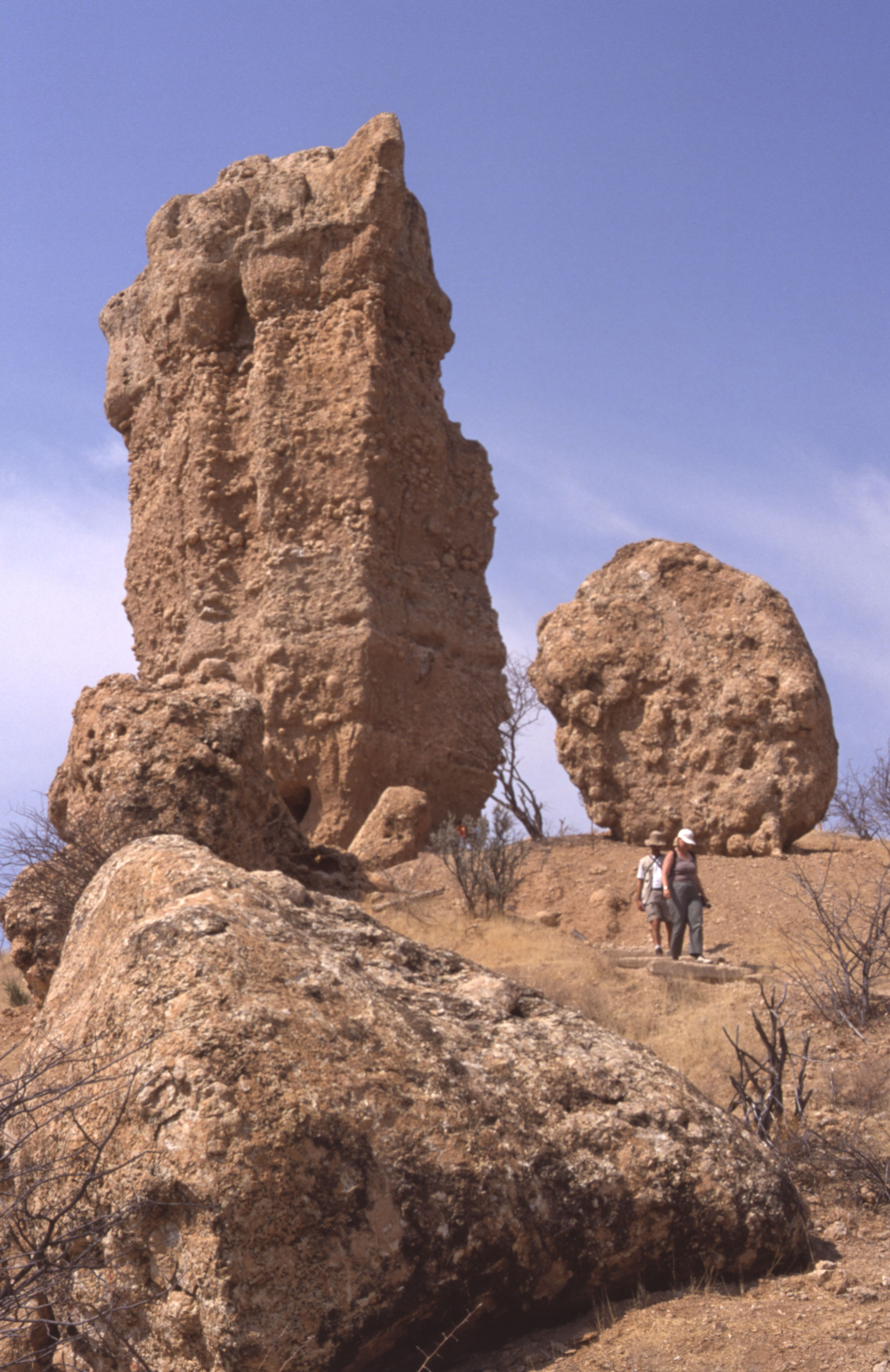
View from the Northeast (2002)

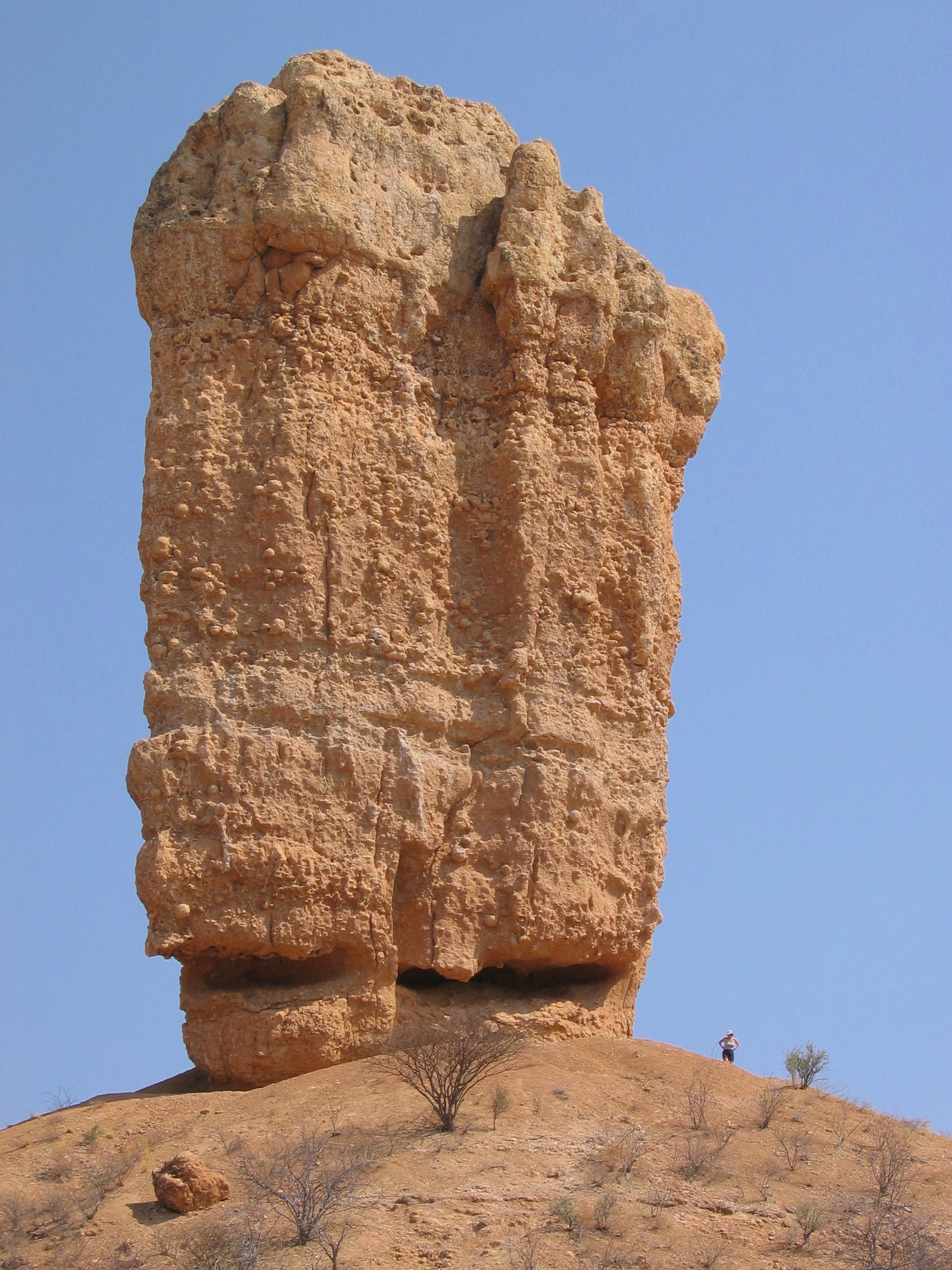
View from the southeast (2004)

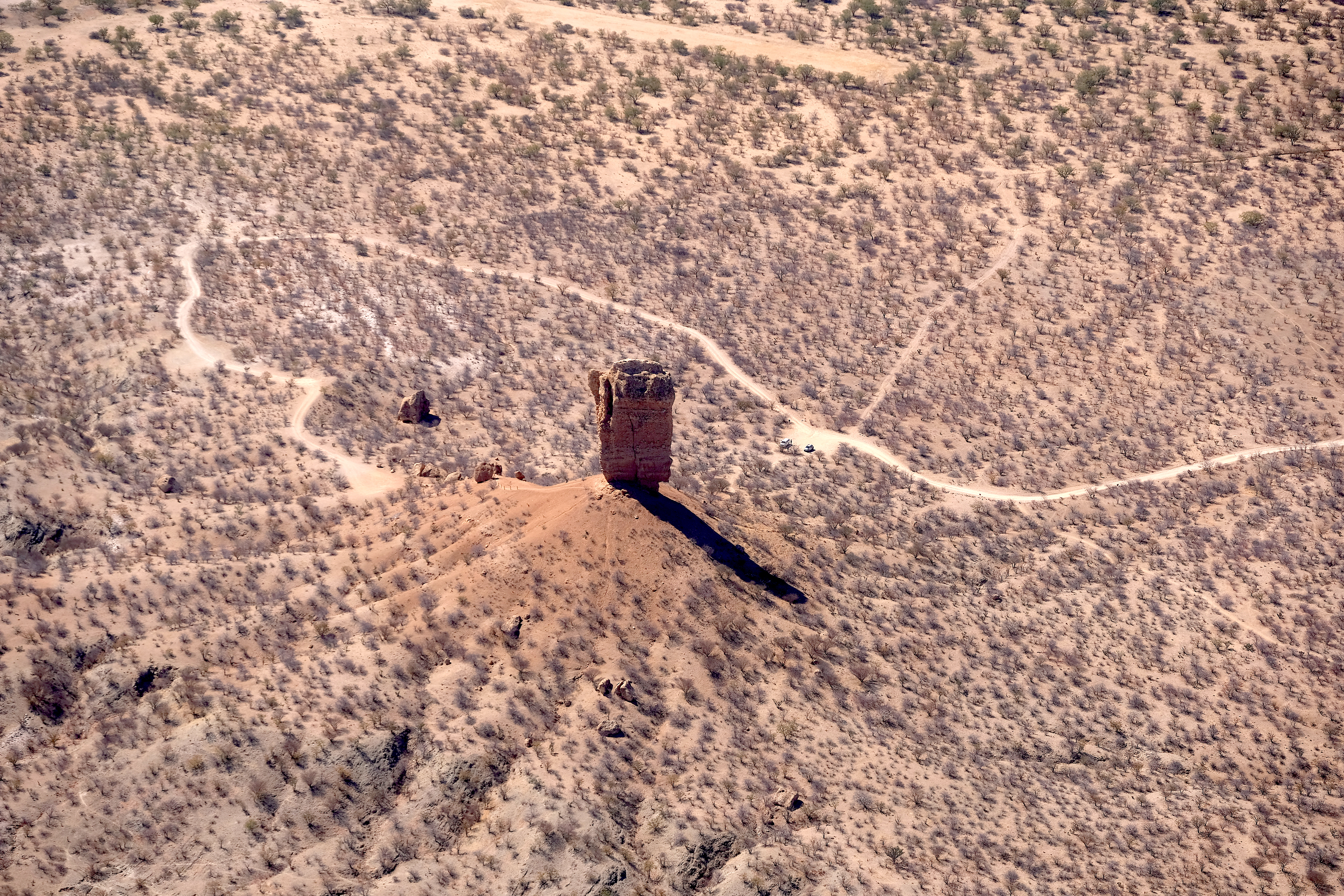
Aerial view from the west (2018)

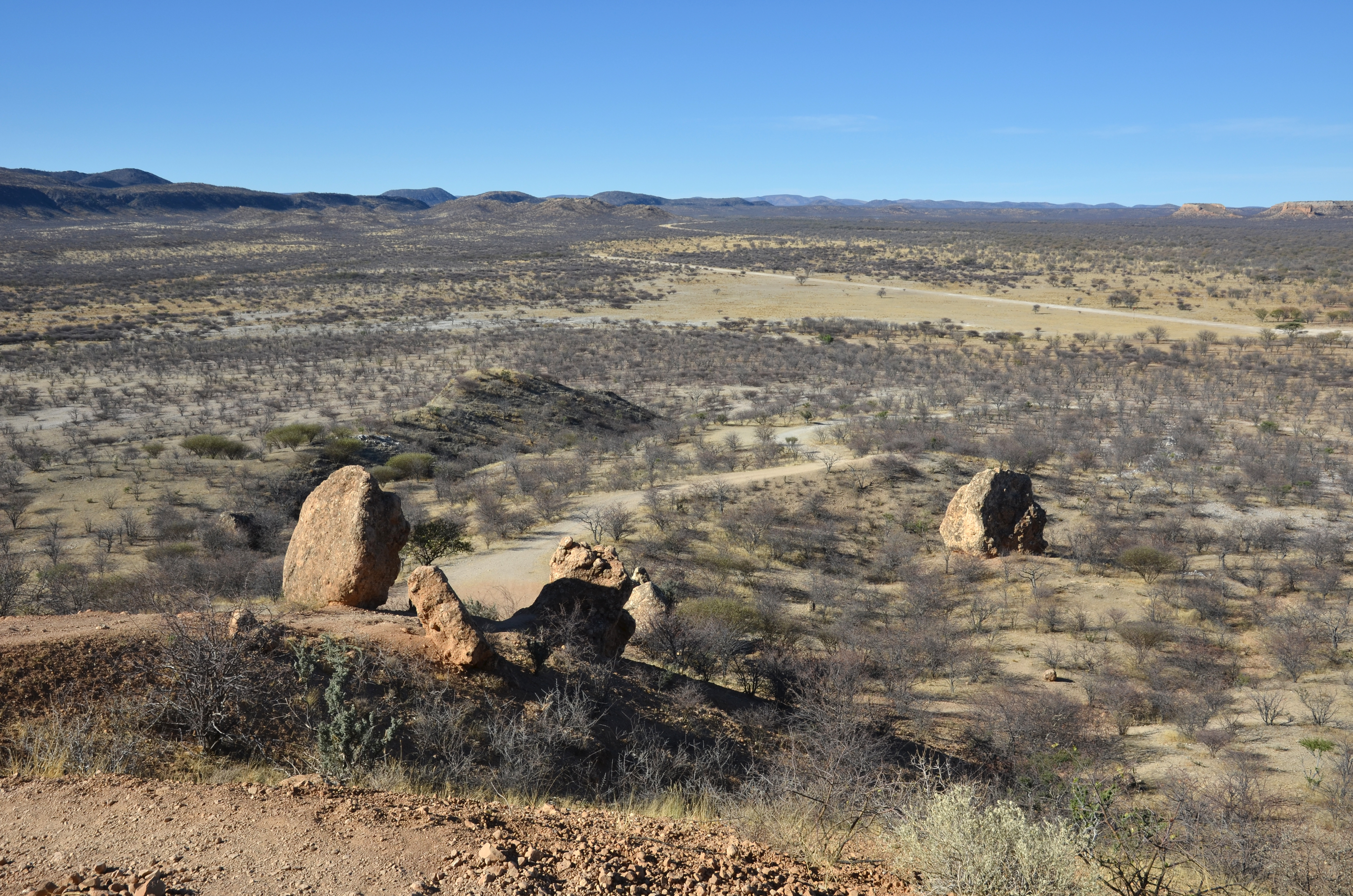
View from Vingerklip to the north

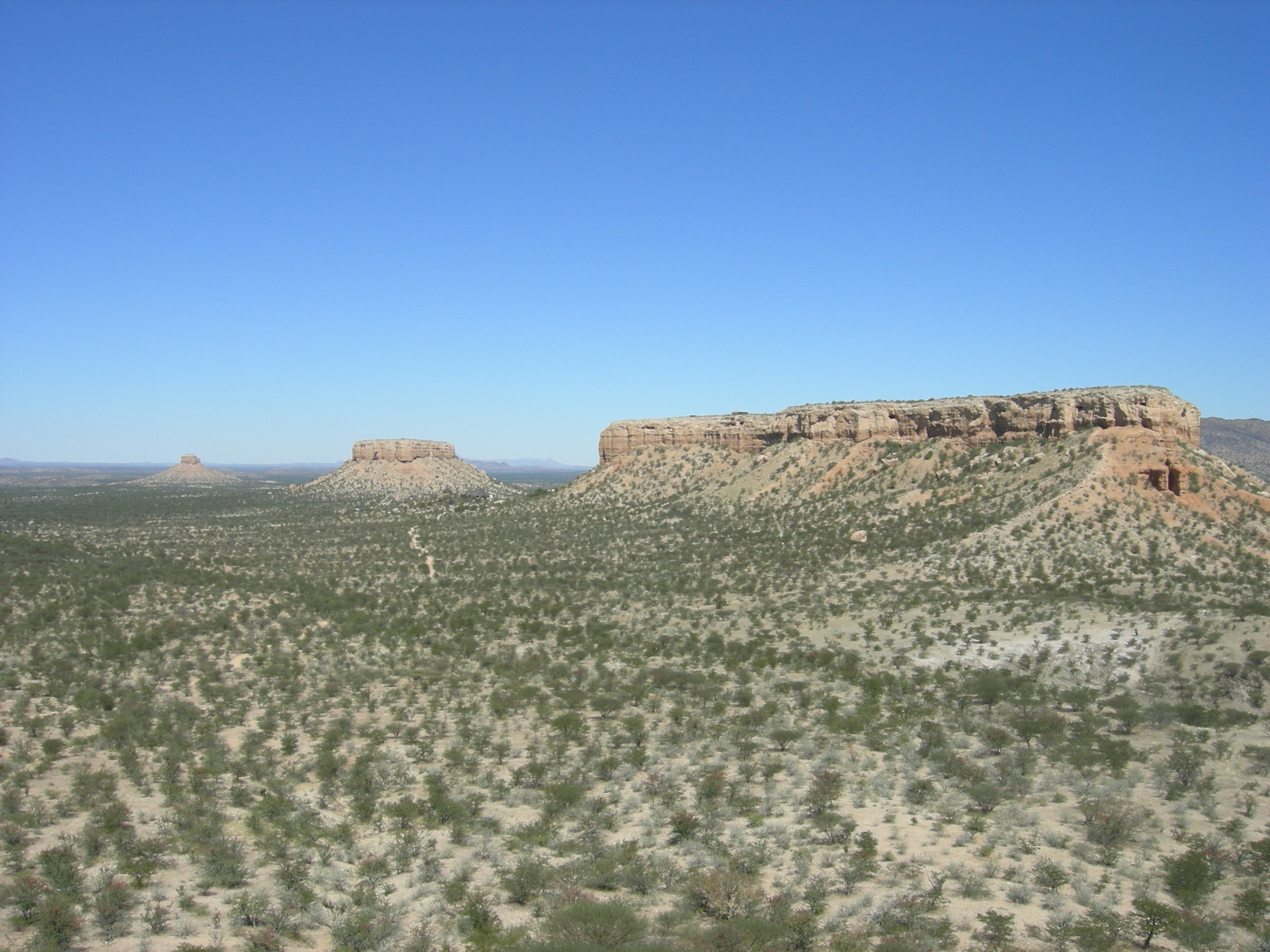
View fromVingerklip to the south

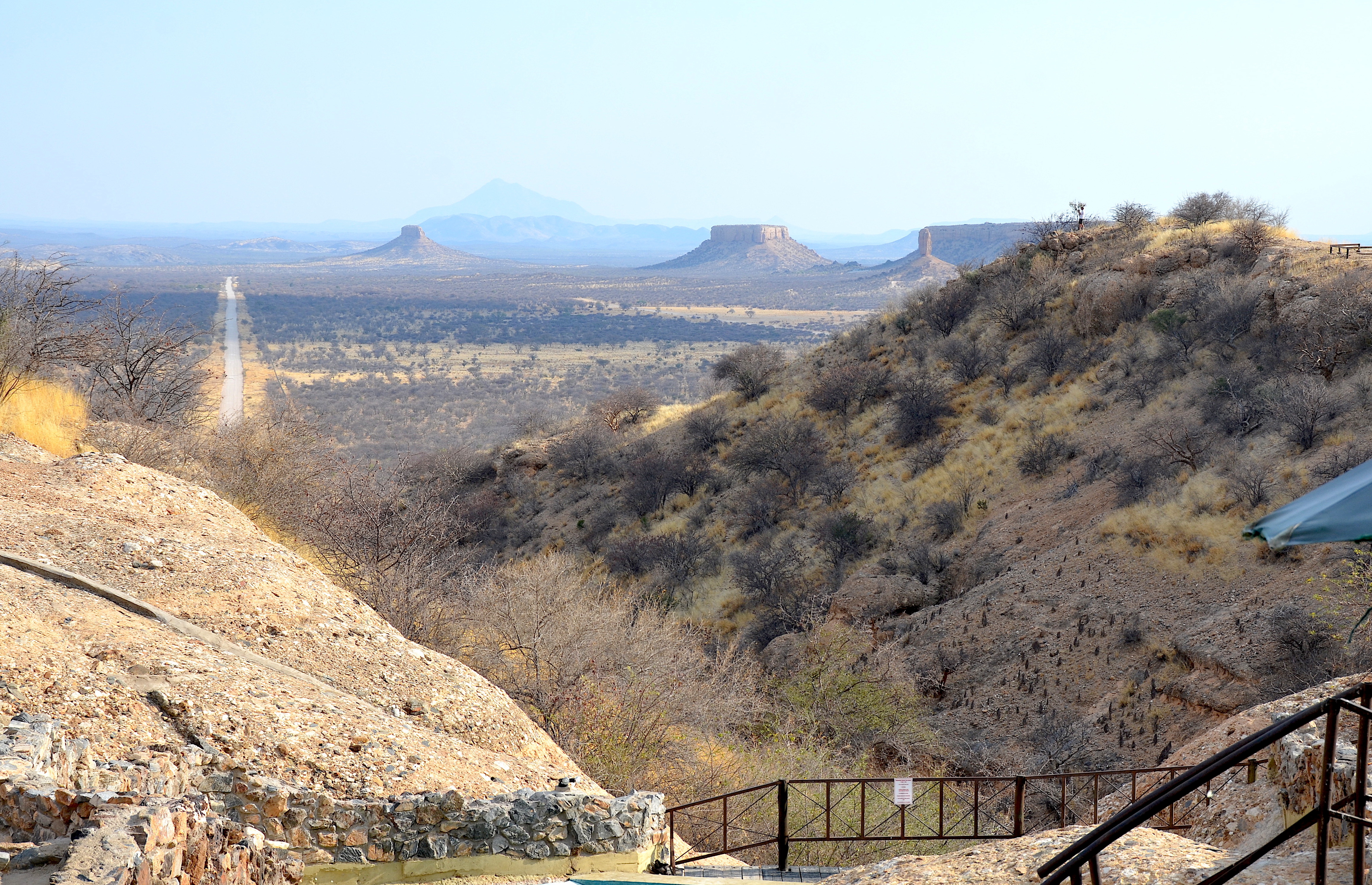
View from Ugab Terrace Lodge to the south on Vingerklip and neighboring table mountains

== Literature ==
- Gabi Schneider: The roadside geology of Namibia. 2. Editiom. Borntraeger, Stuttgart 2008, ISBN 978-3-443-15084-6, p. 120.
- Vingerklip & Ugab Terraces. Fact sheet, Geological Survey of Namibia, 2017 (PDF)
