= Kamanjab =

Kamanjab Otjiherero: Okamanja
- Village
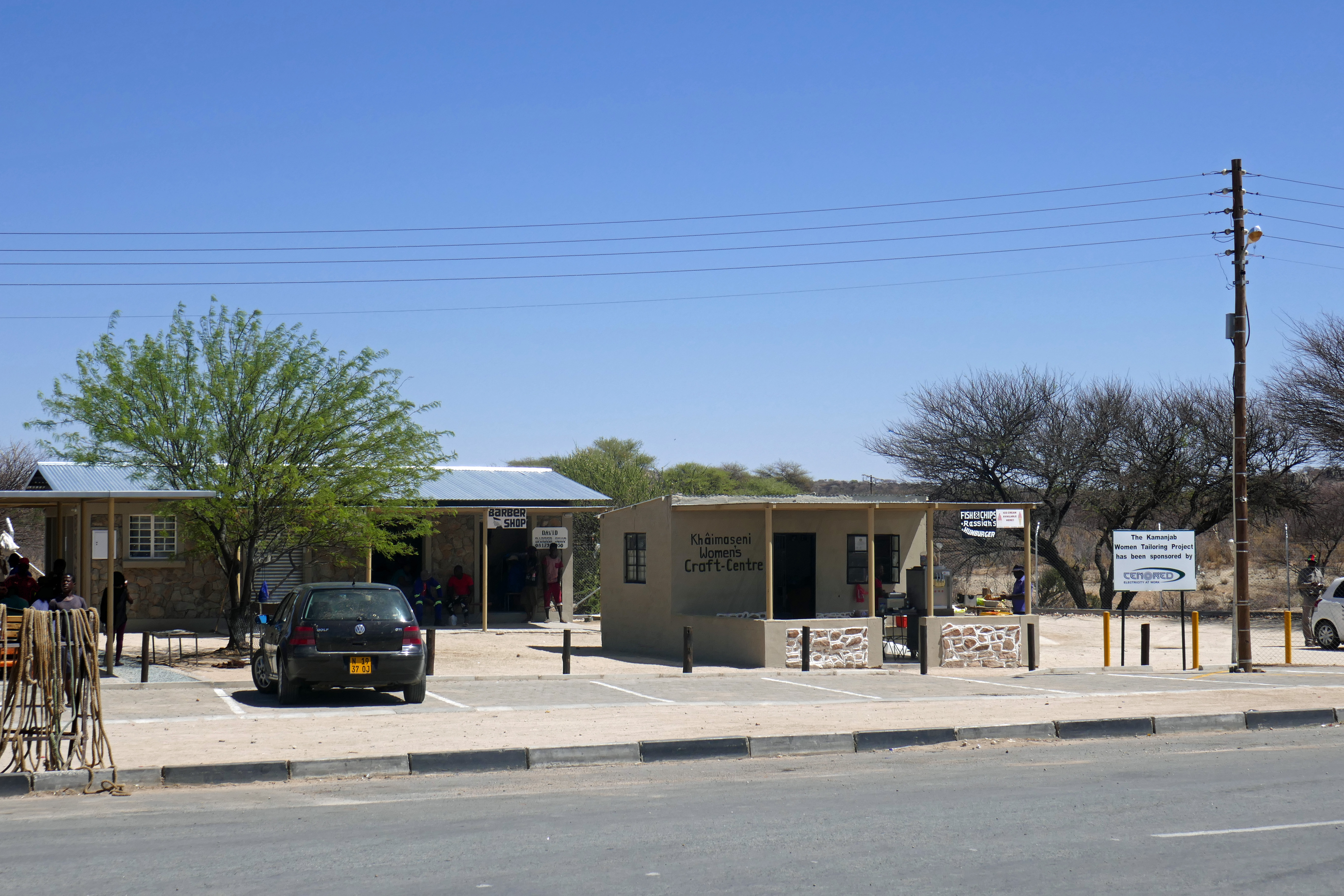
- Craft centre in Kamanjab

- Location in Namibia
- Coordinates: 19°38′S 14°50′E
- Country: Namibia
- Region: Kunene Region
- Constituency: Kamanjab Constituency

Government
  - CEO: Bianca Nguaiko

Population (2023)
  - Total: 3,915
- Time zone: UTC+2 (SAST)
- Climate: BWh

Kamanjab (Otjiherero: Okamanja, place of big stones) is a village in the Kunene Region of Namibia. The name is adapted from the Otjiherero with reference to granite blocks occurring there. It is the administrative centre of the Kamanjab Constituency. Kamanjab had 3,915 inhabitants in 2023.

== Economy and infrastructure ==
Kamanjab is situated on the intersection of the regional roads C35 and C40.

As with most Namibian self-governed settlements, Kamanjab is affected by urbanisation. The village has an area where new low-income inhabitants may temporarily settle for a small fee. Once they have stayed for 5 years and paid every month, the plot where they stay is allocated to them.

Historical population
Year	Pop.	±% p.a.
2011	1,323	—
2023	3,915	+9.46%

== Politics ==
Kamanjab is governed by a village council that has five seats.

Upon Namibian independence Kamanjab was governed by a seven-seat village council. The first local election run after independence, the 1992 local elections, was won by SWAPO which obtained 128 votes and gained five seats. The Democratic Turnhalle Alliance (DTA) came second with 52 votes and two seats. The 1998 local authority elections saw an opposition party, the United Democratic Front (UDF), win the council election. It obtained three seats with 102 votes, SWAPO came second with two seats and 70 votes. The remaining two seats went to the DTA, which got 67 votes.

The 2015 local authority election was won by SWAPO which gained three seats (689 votes). The remaining two seats went to the UDF with 375 votes. The 2020 local authority election was won by the UDF which gained 606 votes and two seats. SWAPO was runner-up with 541 votes and two seats. The remaining seat went to the Popular Democratic Movement (PDM, the new name of the DTA, 82 votes).
