= Sebastian Ignatius ǃGobs =

Namibian politician (born 1967)

Sebastian Ignatius ǃGobs (born 4 October 1967 in Omaruru, Erongo Region) is a Namibian politician.

A member of the United Democratic Front (UDF), ǃGobs was a member of the town council of Khorixas from 1999 to 2001, and the town council of Usakos from 2001 to 2004. Since 2004 he runs on an UDF ticket for Khorixas Constituency. He won the 2004 regionaI eIection and became constituency councillor. Following this election, he was chosen as the UDF's only member of the 3rd National Council.

ǃGobs continued to contest regional elections for the Khorixas Constituency but narrowly lost to Elias ǀAro Xoagub of SWAPO in 2015. In the 2020 regional election he beat SWAPO's Xoagub with 1,677 votes to 1,112.

ǃGobs has been a member of the UDF since the party's inception in 1989. He graduated with a diploma in urban planning from the University of Namibia in 2005.
