= Khorixas Constituency =

Electoral constituency in the Kunene region of north-western Namibia

Coordinates: 20°22′20″S 14°57′37″E

Khorixas
- Constituency
- Khorixas constituency (red) in the Kunene Region
- Region: Kunene Region
- Population: 10,906 (2004)
- Major settlements: Khorixas; Fransfontein
- Area: 21,328 km^{2} (8,235 sq mi)

Current constituency
- Created: 1992

Khorixas Constituency is an electoral constituency in Namibia. It is represented in the Regional Council of Kunene Region. The constituency office is situated in Khorixas. The constituency covers an area of 21,328 km^{2} (8,235 sq mi) and had a population of 10,906 in 2004. As of 2020, it has 8,788 registered voters. Fransfontein also belongs to this constituency.

The name of this constituency derives from Khoekhoe: khori, the mustard bush, a water bush that grows in the area. This area is famous for the Ugab Terraces, a stone monolith that can be seen from afar. There is also a petrified forest, and rock engravings in Twyfelfontein.

== Politics ==
The Khorixas area is historically considered a political stronghold for the opposition, particularly the United Democratic Front (UDF). In the first regional election in 1992 Simson Tjongarero (UDF) won with 2,433 votes and became councillor. Abraham Witbooi of SWAPO came second with 944 votes, followed by Gottlieb Gomachab of the Democratic Turnhalle Alliance (DTA) with 686 votes.

In the 2004 regional election, Sebastian Ignatius ǃGobs of the UDF beat out Theophelus ǁKhamuseb of SWAPO for the regional councillor position with a vote total of 2,623 against 1,643.

The 2015 regional election were won by Elias ǀAro Xoagub of SWAPO with 2,554 votes, closely followed by UDF's ǃGobs with 2,008 votes. In the 2020 regional election UDF's ǃGobs beat SWAPO's Xoagub with 1,677 votes to 1,112.
