= Marius Sheya =

Namibian politician and member of parliament

Member of the National Assembly of Namibia
- Incumbent
- Assumed office 20 March 2025

Personal details
- Party: SWAPO

Marius Sheya is a Namibian politician from SWAPO who has been a member of the Parliament of Namibia since 2025. He is a former governor of Kunene Region.

== See also ==
- List of members of the 8th National Assembly of Namibia
