= Kamanjab Constituency =

Electoral constituency in the Kunene region of north-western Namibia

Coordinates: 19°38′S 14°50′E

Kamanjab
- Constituency
- Kamanjab constituency (red) in the Kunene Region
- Region: Kunene Region
- Population: 6,012 (2004)
- Major settlements: Kamanjab
- Area: 17,130 km^{2} (6,614 sq mi)

Current constituency
- Created: 1992

Kamanjab Constituency is an electoral constituency in Namibia. It is represented in the Regional Council of Kunene Region. The constituency office is situated in Kamanjab. The constituency covers an area of 17,130 km^{2} (6,614 sq mi) and had a population of 6,012 in 2004. As of 2020, it had 4,862 registered voters. The district capital is the settlement of Kamanjab.

== Politics ==
The Khorixas area is historically considered a political stronghold for the opposition, particularly the United Democratic Front (UDF). In the first regional election in 1992 Esegiel ǀUirab of SWAPO won narrowly with 1,108 votes and became councillor. Frederick Albertus Botha of the Democratic Turnhalle Alliance (DTA) came second with 995 votes.

The 2004 regional election were won by Themistokles Dudu Murorua of the United Democratic Front (UDF) with 1,201 of the 2,321 votes cast. He represented the constituency until 2015. In the 2015 regional election the candidate of the SWAPO party, Angenesia Tjaritje, won narrowly with 1,164 votes, followed by Nico Somaeb of the UDF with 896 votes. The UDF candidate Somaeb narrowly won the 2020 regional election with 1,116 votes. SWAPO's Nikodemus Amutenya came second with 919 votes.
