= Ugab River =

River in Namibia

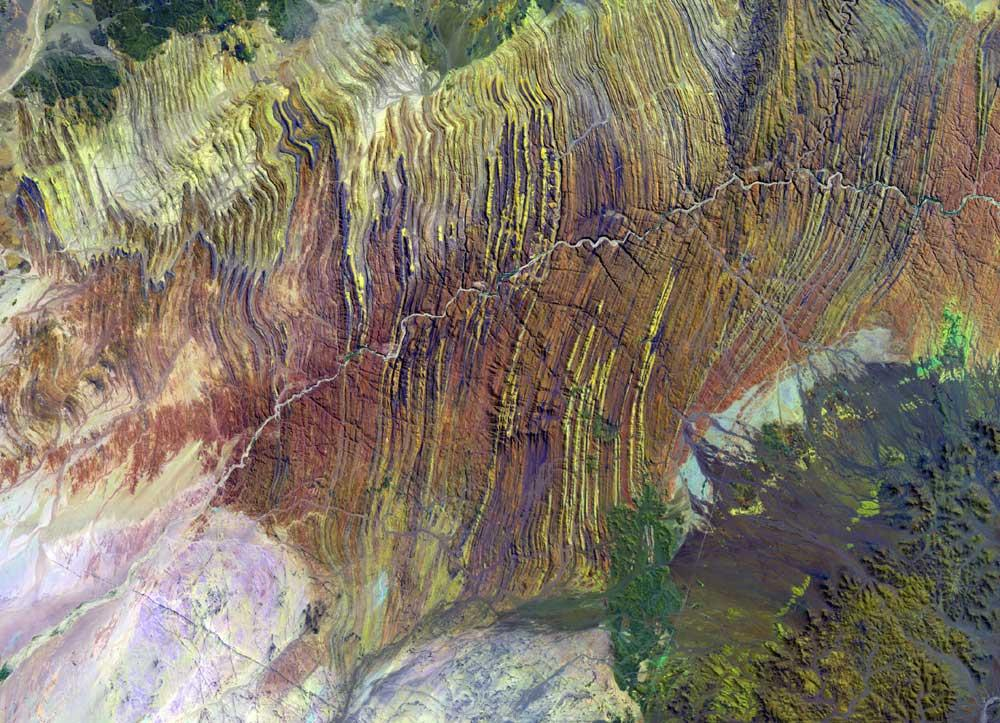
- Ugab River from space

Physical characteristics
- Source: near Otavi
  - location: Kunene Region, Namibia
  - coordinates: 21°11′S 13°37′E
- Mouth: Atlantic Ocean
  - elevation: 0 m (0 ft)
- Length: c. 540 km (340 mi)
- Basin size: 28,400 km^{2} (11,000 sq mi)

Basin features
- Tributaries
  - left: Erundu River, Ozongombo River, Okomize River, Uis River
  - right: Goantagab River

The Ugab River is an ephemeral river in north-western Namibia. Its lower section forms the border between Kunene Region and Erongo Region but its catchment area extends well into the Otjozondjupa Region. Ugab's source is near Otavi. From there the riverbed leads westwards past the Paresis Mountains and the Fransfontein Mountains into the Skeleton Coast and the Atlantic Ocean. Inflows of the Ugab are Erundu, Ozongombo, Okomize and Uis.

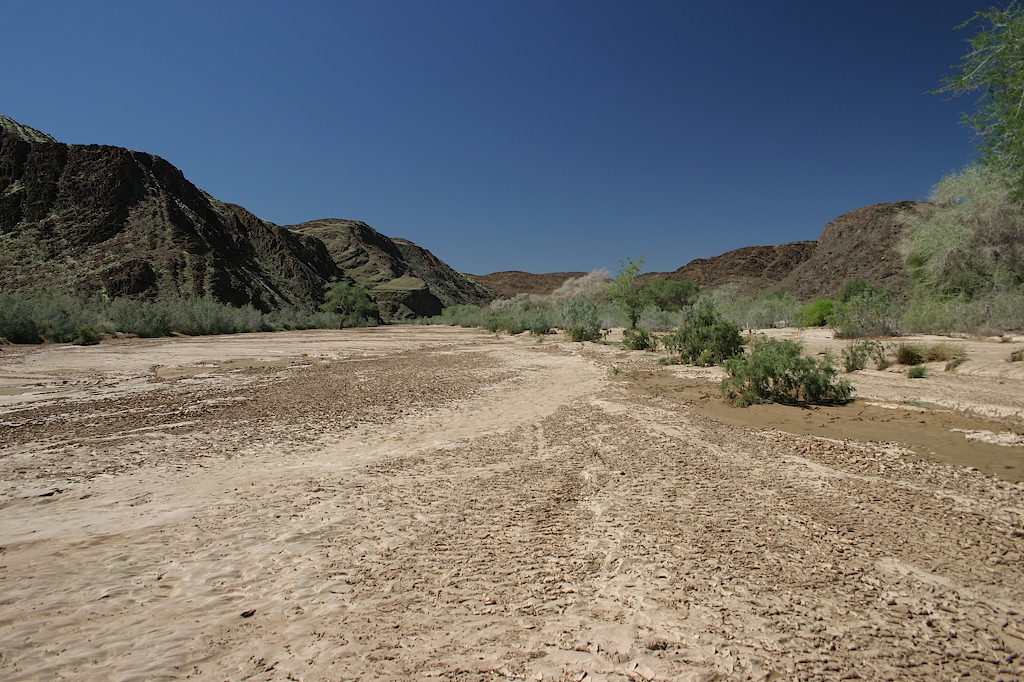
View of the sandy bed

The river only flows above the surface of its sandy bed a few days each year, but even during much of the dry season its subterranean water surfaces as pools in places, and provides an important resource for species in the Damaraland region of northern Namibia. The Ugab's mean run-off is roughly 20 million cubic metres per annum, while its catchment area (including its tributaries) is estimated to be between 24,800 and 29,355 square kilometres (11,334 sq mi).

The Ugab River's large subterranean water content makes it a major Namibian river. Stretched out for 450 kilometres (280 mi), the river provides water for species such as the rare desert elephant, as well as giraffe, mountain zebra and the largest population of free-roaming black rhinoceroses in the world. The Ugab Wilderness Area was established here to protect the future of these rare animals. Important tourism destinations are the Brandberg, the Doros Crater and the Vingerklip. Towns and settlements in its catchment area are Outjo, Otjiwarongo, Kalkfeld, Omatjette and Uis.

It is possible to drive or trek the length of the sandy river, passing local Herero farmers and the pink granite inselbergs (isolated rocky hills left behind after volcanic activity) dotted throughout the region. These bizarre stones have been shaped over the years into vaguely recognisable shapes, some looking like toadstools, while others are eerie hollow structures known as the 'Petrified Ghosts'.

Quite a few plants species can be found in the area - including wild tobacco (Nicotiana glauca), acacia trees, mopani trees and ǃnara bushes (Acanthosicyos horridus) with their almost-leafless spiky green stems, and spiky melon-like fruit. The type specimen of the three meter long stem tetrapod, Gaiasia, was discovered in the Ugab River Valley in 2015 and described in 2024.
