= Opuwo Constituency =

Coordinates: 18°4′S 13°51′E

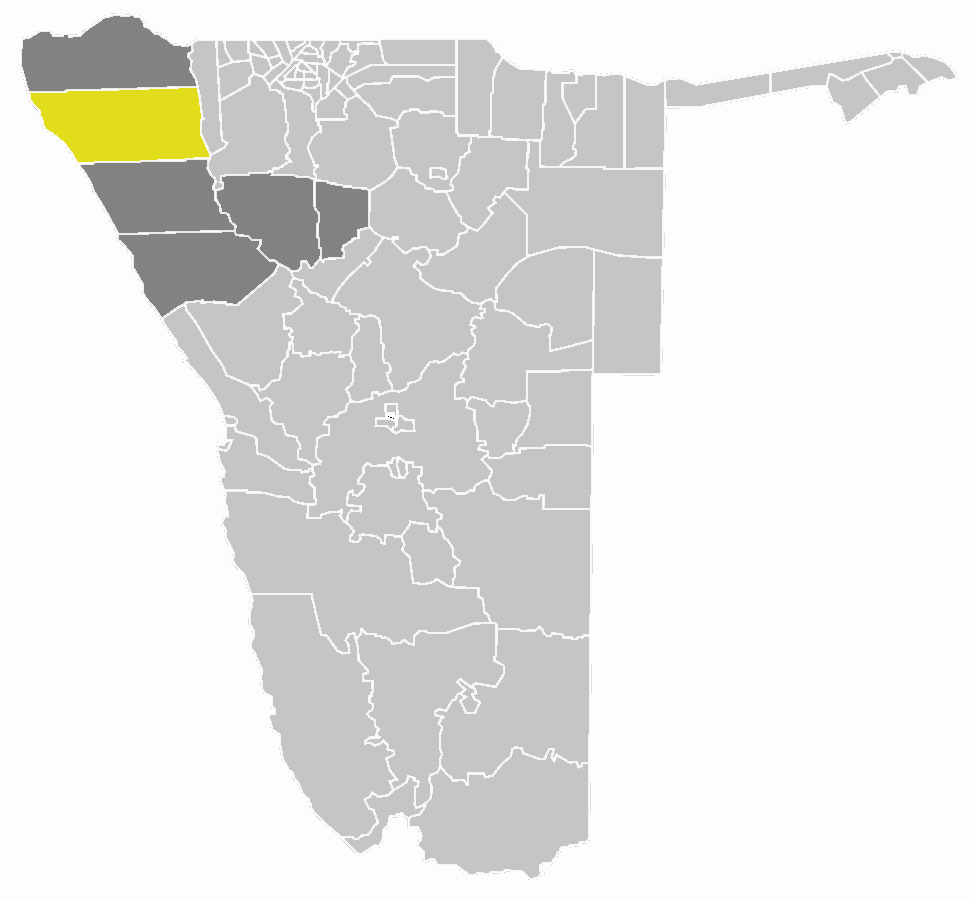
Former Opuwo Constituency (yellow) in the Kunene Region (dark grey)

Opuwo was a constituency in the Kunene Region of Namibia. Its population in 2010 was 20,119, and its administrative capital was Opuwo.

Opuwo Constituency was dissolved in August 2013, in preparation for the 2014 general election. Following a recommendation of the Fourth Delimitation Commission of Namibia the new constituencies Opuwo Urban (comprising the townlands and immediate surroundings of Opuwo), and Opuwo Rural (comprising the remainder of Opuwo Constituency) were created.

== Politics ==
Opuwo Constituency had had considerable opposition support since Independence of Namibia. In the first regional elections in 1992 for the National Assembly of Namibia, Edward Uapundua Mumbuu of the Democratic Turnhalle Alliance (DTA) won and became the inaugural councillor of the constituency. He received 3,523 votes, well ahead of Erasmus Nganjone of SWAPO who received 1,553 votes. The SWANU candidate came third with 106 votes.

The 2004 regional election was won by Nghohauvi Kavetu of the DTA with 2,750 of the 5,996 votes cast.
