= Okalongo Constituency =

Electoral constituency in the Omusati region of northern Namibia

Coordinates: 17°26′S 15°20′E

Okalongo Constituency (red) in the Omusati Region

Okalongo Constituency (until 1998 Okalonga Constituency) is an electoral constituency in the Omusati Region of Namibia, located on the border with Angola. It had 16,031 registered voters in 2020.

Okalongo Constituency covers an area of 657 km^{2} (254 sq mi). It had a population of 30,609 in 2011, up from 28,719 in 2001. The capital of the constituency is the settlement of Okalongo. Other villages within the constituency include Onandjaba, Omatwadiva, Onaidjimba, Okafitu Kauvale, Olwiili, Ongolo, Ondudu, Onembaba, Ondobe Yehumba, Ondobe Yefidi, Ohakapeke, Olupandu, Epoko, Olupito, Oupale, Oshuundje, Okathitu Konghai, Oikango, Onalumbololo, Uushwa, Orange ya Nashimbuli, Omutundungu, Oshiteyatemo, Aanongo, Ombwana, Eshwa la Hamukwaya, and Onambome.

== Politics ==
Like all other constituencies in Omusati, Okalongo Constituency is traditionally a stronghold of the South West Africa People's Organization (SWAPO) party. In the 2004 regional election, SWAPO politician Haikella Jhonny Hakaye won the election, receiving 9,841 of the 9,897 votes cast.

SWAPO also won by a landslide in the 2015 regional election. Laurentius Iipinge secured 6,923 votes, while Simson Nangolo of the Democratic Turnhalle Alliance (DTA) received only 80 votes.

Councillor Iipinge (SWAPO) was reelected in the 2020 regional election, obtaining 5,667 votes. His closest competitor, Josua Mwetupunga of the Independent Patriots for Change (IPC, an opposition party formed in August 2020), received 1,281 votes.

== Education ==
Primary schools in Okalongo Constituency include Lucas Damascus Primary School, Ondeipanda Primary School, Ouvale Primary School, St Gabriel Primary School, Elao Primary School, and Eshakeno Primary School. Secondary schools include Haudano Senior Secondary School and Tomas Tutaleni Senior Secondary School. Other schools in the constituency include Oshaaluwata Combined School, Onembaba Combined School, John Shekundja Combined School, Onkambadhala Combined School, Epoko Combined School, Oshatotwa Combined School, and Sheetekela Combined School.
