= Opuwo Rural =

Electoral constituency in the Kunene region of north-western Namibia

Opuwo Rural (red) in the Kunene Region of Namibia

Opuwo Rural is an electoral constituency in the Kunene Region of Namibia. The administrative centre of Opuwo Rural is the settlement of Otuani. As of 2020, it has 7,315 registered voters.

Opuwo Rural was created in August 2013. Following a recommendation of the Fourth Delimitation Commission of Namibia, and in preparation of the 2014 general election, the old Opuwo Constituency was split into Opuwo Urban and Opuwo Rural.

== Politics ==
The 2014 election, both for the presidency and Namibia's National assembly, was won in Opuwo Rural by the Democratic Turnhalle Alliance (DTA). It was the only constituency in the Kunene Region not dominated by SWAPO.

The 2015 regional election was won by Kazeongera Tjeundo of the DTA with 2,209 votes. Japiavi Mbinge of the National Unity Democratic Organisation (NUDO) came second with 895 votes while SWAPO Party candidate Agnes Musaso finished last with 732 votes. Opuwo Rural was one of only two constituencies won by the DTA in this election.

After Tjeundo decided to run for a parliamentary seat in the 2019 Namibian general election, the councillor position became vacant, and a by-election was run in March 2020. Again the Popular Democratic Movement (PDM, the new name for the DTA since 2017) candidate won. Uarikua Kakuva obtained 2,066 votes, ahead of Kapukatua Kuvare (NUDO, 640 votes) and Steyn Katupa (SWAPO, 435 votes). PDM's Kakuva was re-elected by a large margin in the 2020 regional election, obtaining 2,355 votes. NUDO's Kuvare came second with 646 votes, followed by Tjakazapi Mbunguha (SWAPO) with 597 votes.

Councillor Kakuva died in April 2021, and a by-election was held on 2 July 2021. Uakaisiua Muharukua of the PDM won with 2,330 votes, a large margin over runners-up Kazepanda Tjambiru (SWAPO, 486 votes) and Heinz Hariki Maundu (NUDO, 414 votes).

== See also ==
- Administrative divisions of Namibia
