= Bill C-43 =

Bill C-43 is the name of various legislation introduced into the House of Commons of Canada, including

- Privacy Act (Canada), introduced in 1983 as Bill C-43 to the first session of the 32nd Parliament
- Bill C-43, a 1989 bill banning abortion in Canada defeated in the Senate
- 2005 Canadian federal budget, introduced as Bill C-43 to the 38th Parliament
