= C42 road (Namibia) =

Secondary route in Namibia

C42 road

Major junctions
- North-West end: B1 / B15 Tsumeb
- B8 in Grootfontein
- South-East end: C47 Okatjoruu

Location
- Country: Namibia

Highway system
- Transport in Namibia
| ← C41 | → C43 |

C42 is a secondary route in Namibia that runs from Okatjoruu via Grootfontein to Tsumeb. It is 121 kilometres (75 mi) long. The section between Grootfontein and Tsumeb is tarred.

The C42 serves as a link road between the B1, B8 and the B15.
