= Henock ya Kasita =

Namibian politician (1953–2021)

Honourable Henock ya Kasita MP

Deputy minister of lands and resettlement
- In office 2008–2010

Deputy minister of mines and energy
- In office 2003–2008

Regional Councillor for Okaku Constituency
- In office 1993–2010
- Preceded by: position established
- Succeeded by: Joseph Kapya Endjala

President of the IPU Namibian Chapter
- In office 2000–2004

Personal details
- Born: 1 January 1953 Okapya, South West Africa (now Namibia)
- Died: 30 July 2021 (aged 68)
- Party: SWAPO Member of the Swapo Party Central Committee
- Occupation: Teacher
- Profession: Politician
- Committees: Chairman of the National Council
- Website: www.parliament.na

Henock Sheya ya Kasita (1 January 1953 – 30 July 2021) was a Namibian politician who was the deputy minister of lands and resettlement from 2008 to 2010. He previously was deputy minister of mines and energy from 2003 to 2008, SWAPO chief whip in the National Council from 1994 to 2003. He was a member of the National Council for Oshana Region from 1993 to 2010, and a founding councilor for Okaku Constituency in 1993 until 2010. He was also deputy chairperson for the Inter-Parliamentary Union (IPU) National Group from 1996 to 2000, and became its chairperson from 2000 to 2004.

== Political life ==
Ya Kasita earned a Diploma in Infantry Battalion in the USSR in 1978 and another Diploma in Social Science and Management from the Academy of Social Sciences in Sofia, Bulgaria, in 1980 as well as Diploma, Major Infantry Battalion Commander, Odesa, Ukraine, USSR and a Diploma in Journalism in Lubango, Angola High School Teacher's Certificate, Cuba, in 1986, and a Diploma in Marxist–Leninist Philosophy and International Political Relations in Havana, Cuba. He had a Matric /Senior Certificate, Higher Institute, South Africa (1994) and read law at the Unisa, South Africa in 1999. He had a certificate from Tulane Law School, New Orleans, Louisiana, USA (2000).

== Education ==
He began his career as a teacher at Eheke Senior Primary School in Oshana region in 1977 before fleeing into exile in Angola where he was AAD platoon commander at Tobias Hainyeko Training College from 1978 to 1979. He was a detachment political commissar, NW Front (1980–1981), a political instructor for SWAPO-PLAN combatants in Angola (1981–1983), SWAPO deputy secretary for youth in Cuba (1983–1985); school principal for primary and junior secondary schools at Hosea Kutako, Island of Youth, Cuba (1986–1988); SWAPO regional mobiliser at Grootfontein, Otjozondjupa Region (1989–1990); SWAPO district co-ordinator, Okango, Ohangwena Region (1990–1991); SWAPO regional mobiliser, Oshakati, Oshana region (1991–1992); SWAPO district co-ordinator for Okaku (1992). He was elected as a SWAPO member of the central committee in 1998.
