= C45 road (Namibia) =

Road in Namibia

C45 road

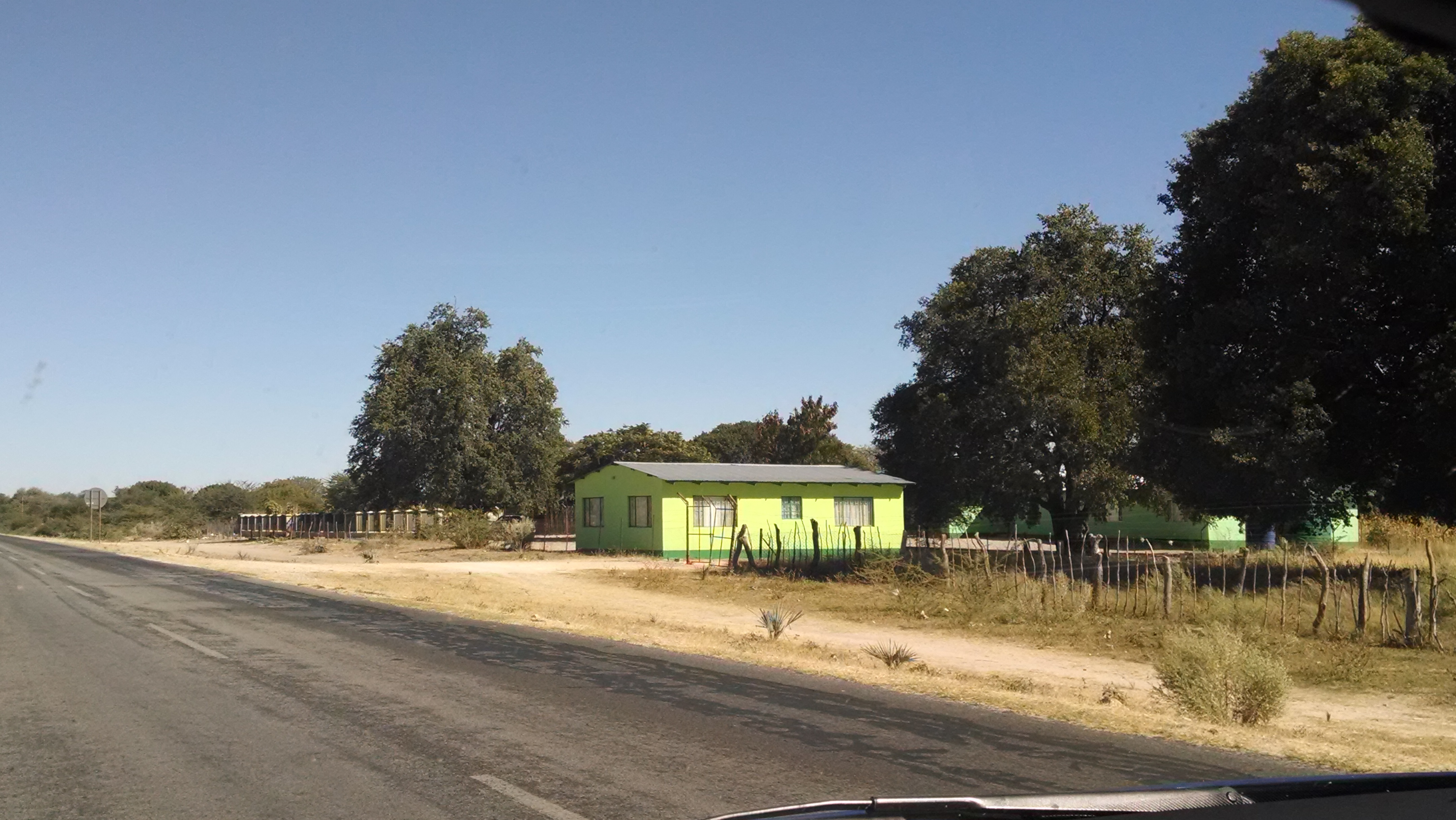

Major junctions
- Southwest end: C46 in Oshakati
- Northeast end: B1 south of Omafo

Location
- Country: Namibia

Highway system
- Transport in Namibia
← C44	→ C46

C45 is a tar road in northern Namibia, connecting Oshakati to the northern part of the B1 in Ohangwena Region. It is 41 kilometres (25 mi) long.
