= Palmwag =

Tourism concession area in north-western Namibia

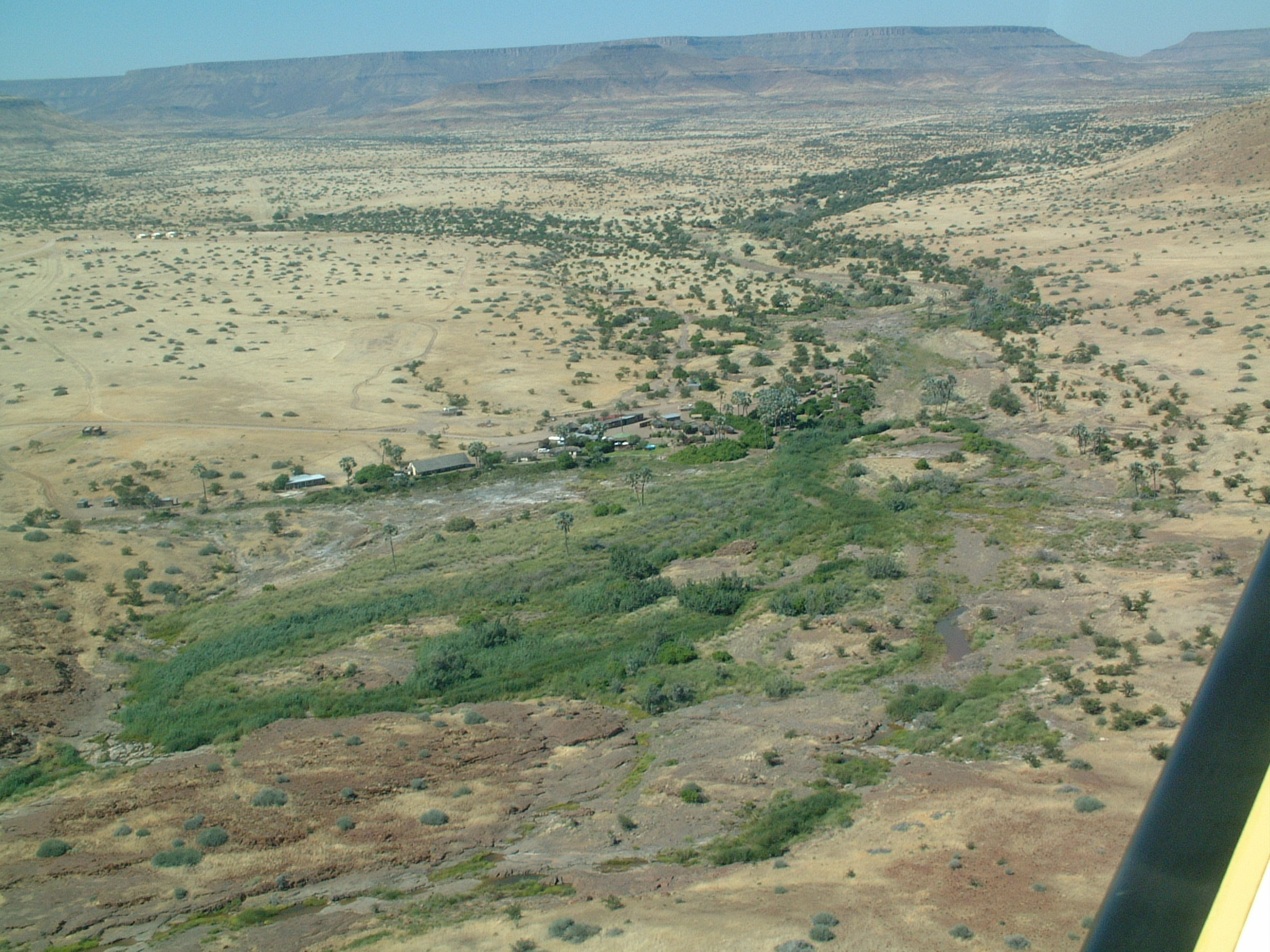
The Uniab at Palmwag

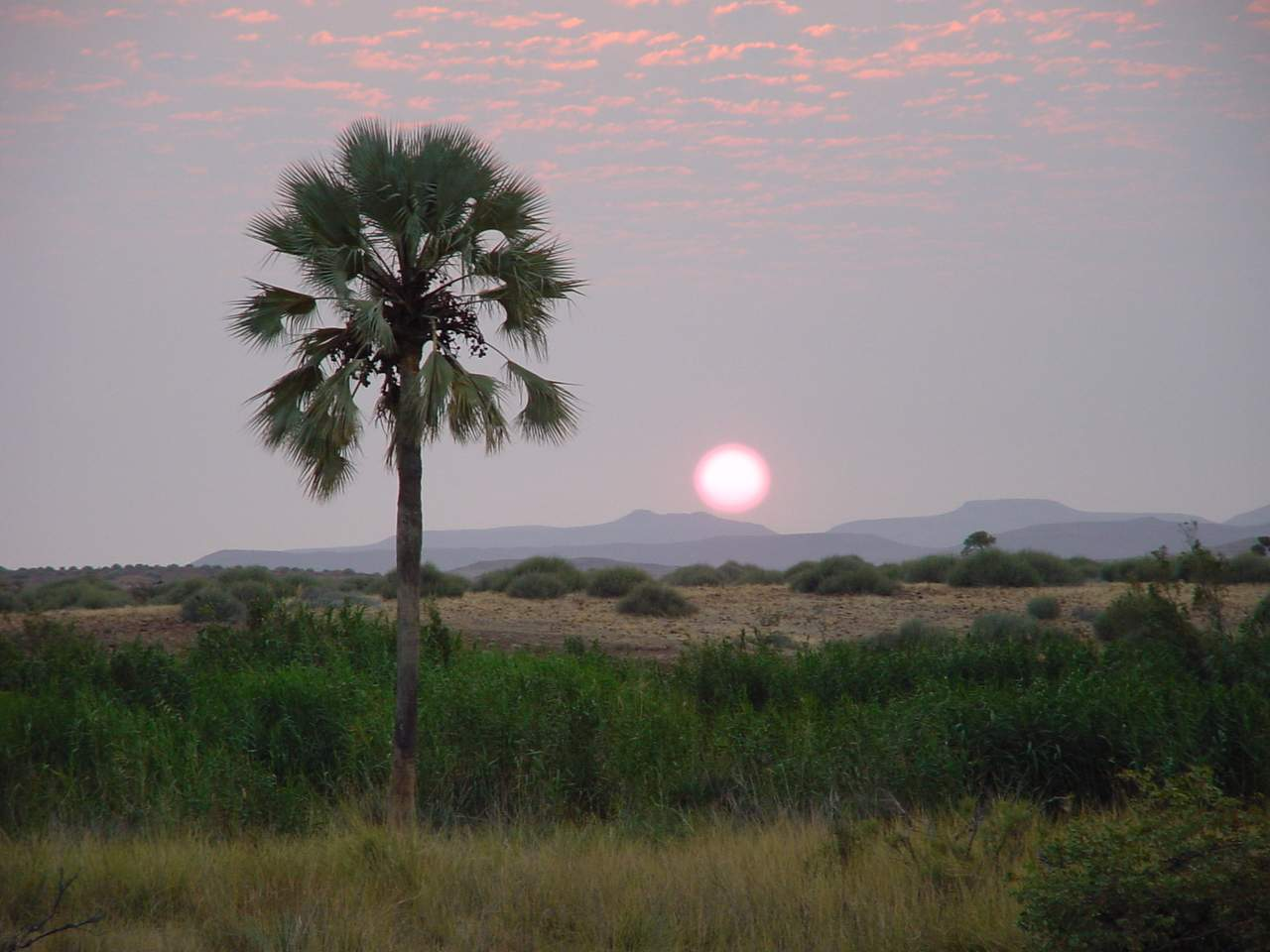
Sunset at Palmwag Lodge

Palmwag is a veterinary control point, an oasis and a tourism concession area on communal land in northern Namibia. It is located in the Kunene region on the Uniab River, in northwestern Damaraland, halfway between Swakopmund and the Etosha National Park. It covers an area of 400,000 hectares and has populations of Hyphaena petersiana. Palmwag is situated on the Red Line, a veterinary cordon fence separating northern Namibia from the rest of the country.

Wildlife in Palmwag includes leopards, lions, cheetahs, mountain zebras, Angolan giraffes, springboks, kudu, and African bush elephants. The reserve has the largest population of south-western black rhinos in Africa; a local organization called Save the Rhino Trust protects them.

Palmwag is also a tourist attraction. The tourism concession was granted in 1986 and Palmwag Lodge opened in the same year.
