= Kunene Region =

- Region
- Motto(s): Unity, Development and Progress
- Location of the Kunene Region in Namibia
- Country: Namibia
- Capital: Opuwo

Government
  - Governor: Vipuakuje Muharukua

Area
  - Total: 115,260 km^{2} (44,500 sq mi)

Population (2023 census)
  - Total: 120,762
  - Density: 1.0477/km^{2} (2.7136/sq mi)
- Time zone: UTC+2 (CAT)
- HDI (2017): 0.576 medium · 14th
- Website: kunenerc.gov.na

Kunene is one of the fourteen regions of Namibia. Its capital is Opuwo, its governor is Vipuakuje Muharukua. The region's name comes from the Kunene River which forms the northern border with Angola.

== Geography ==
Besides the capital Opuwo, the region contains the municipality of Outjo, the town Khorixas, the self-governed village Kamanjab, and hundreds of small settlements like Otjomotjira.

Kunene is home to the Himba people, a subtribe of the Herero, as well as to Damara people and Nama people. As of 2020, Kunene had 58,548 registered voters.

Kunene's western edge is the shores of the Atlantic Ocean. In the north, it borders Angola's Namibe Province, and in the far eastern part of its northern edge it borders Cunene Province. Domestically, it borders the following regions:

- Omusati - northeast, west of Oshana
- Oshana - northeast, between Omusati and Oshikoto
- Oshikoto - northeast, east of Oshikoto
- Otjozondjupa - east
- Erongo - south

=== Demographics ===
According to the Namibia 2023 Population and Housing Census, Kunene has a population of 120,762 (60,573 females and 60,189 males or 101 males for every 100 females) growing at an annual rate of 2.7%. The fertility rate is 4.4 children per woman. 33.7% live in urban areas while 66.3% live in rural areas, and with an area of 115,293 km^{2}, the population density is 1.0 persons per km^{2}. By age, 15.9% of the population was under 5 years old, 15.7% between 5–14 years, 51.3% between 15–59 years, and 7.0% 60 years and older. The population was divided into 28,890 households, with an average size of 3.8 persons. 48.1% of households had a female head of house, while 51.9% had a male. For those 15 years and older, 68.0% had never married, 9.0% married with certificate, 14.6% married traditionally, 2.8% married by a consensual union, 2.1% were divorced or separated, and 2.6% were widowed.

In 2001, the most commonly spoken languages at home were Otjiherero languages (42% of households) and Nama/Damara (36%). For those 15 years and older, the literacy rate was 63.8%. In terms of education, of those older than 15, 45.9% have left school, 14.6% are currently at school, and 37.6% have never attended. According to the 2012 Namibia Labour Force Survey, unemployment in the Kunene Region stood at 27.0%.

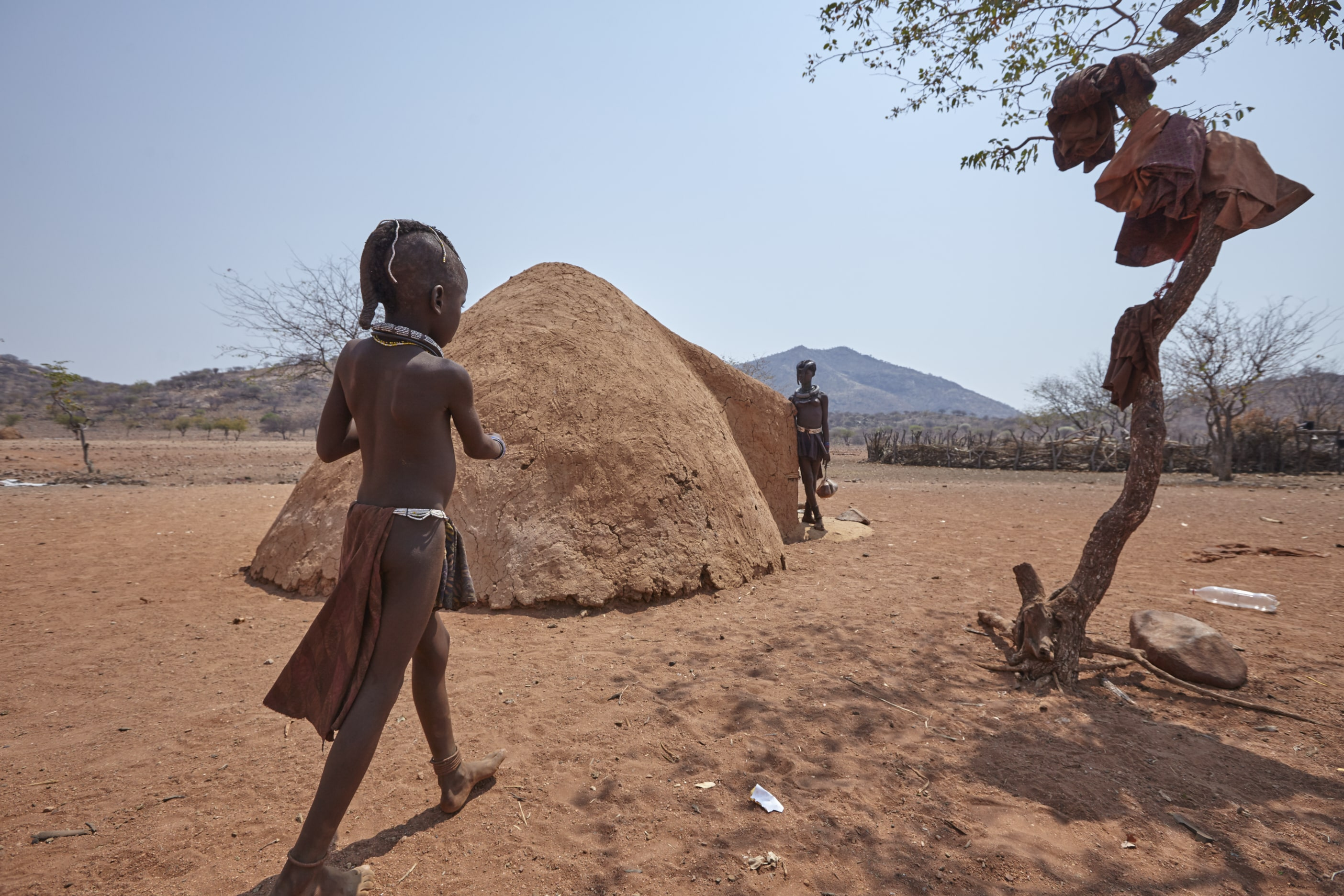
Mud hut in Okapare

Among households, 74.1% have safe water, 64.2% no toilet facility, 33.6% electricity for lighting, and 72.2% had wood or charcoal for cooking. In terms of household's main sources of income, 16.2% derive it from farming, 35% from wages and salaries, 4.7% from business or non-farming, and 12.8% from old-age pension.

== Politics ==
Kunene constituencies (2014)

The region comprises seven constituencies:

- Epupa (until 1998 Ruacana Constituency)
- Kamanjab
- Khorixas
- Opuwo Rural (created 2013 from a split of Opuwo Constituency)
- Opuwo Urban (created 2013 from a split of Opuwo Constituency)
- Outjo
- Sesfontein

Kunene is one of few regions that Namibia's ruling SWAPO party does not dominate. Previously the rivalry was mainly with the United Democratic Front (UDF), but recently other parties show good results in Kunene's constituencies. In November 2008, SWAPO activists and politicians called for organization to "destroy" the UDF government in Kunene. SWAPO also claimed that UDF and Democratic Turnhalle Alliance (DTA) were "sabotaging" local government initiatives in the region due to incompetence.

Central to the politics of Kunene Region is the battle over the proposed Epupa Dam in Epupa Constituency near the border with Angola. Business leaders based in Opuwo, who are mostly Ovambo people, formed the Kaoko Development League which supports the proposed dam. The dam would bring in economic development to much of the Region but would interfere with the traditional way of life of the Himba people who reside in the area. A longtime rivalry exists between SWAPO and the Himba people.

=== National elections ===
In the 2004 election for the National Assembly of Namibia, voters in Kunene Region supported numerous parties. The UDF earned the party's single highest vote total and 22.19% of the party's national vote total in the region.

=== Regional elections ===
In the first regional elections in 1992 for the National Assembly of Namibia, SWAPO won in Kamanjab and Outjo. The UDF won in Sesfontein and Khorixas, Opuwo was won by the DTA.

In the 2004 regional election for the National Assembly of Namibia, SWAPO won only one constituency in Kunene. Consequently, the only members of the 3rd National Council of Namibia, which was created by appointments from every regional council, who were not members of SWAPO were chosen by the Kunene Regional Council. These Councillors were Sebastian Ignatius ǃGobs of the UDF and Ngohauvi Lydia Kavetu of the DTA.

In the 2015 regional elections SWAPO obtained 46% of the total votes (2010: 42%) and won in five of the seven constituencies while the DTA won two. The two Kunene constituencies Epupa and Opuwo Rural were the only ones the DTA won throughout Namibia. In the 2020 regional election SWAPO obtained 34% of the total votes and won only Outjo Constituency. The Popular Democratic Movement (PDM, the new name of the DTA) and the UDF won three constituencies each.

=== Governors ===
Themistokles Dudu Murorua, a UDF member, was appointed governor of Kunene Region in 2005. He was later replaced by Joshua ǁHoebeb. Following the 2014 elections and SWAPO's win in Kunene, Angelika Muharukua was appointed governor, and after her death in 2017, Marius Sheya was appointed. Marius Sheya was Kunene's governor until 2025, when he was elected as a member of the National Assembly, and Vipuakuje Muharukua was appointed as governor.

== Health ==
Cholera is a major concern in Kunene Region, particularly near the border with Angola. In December 2008, while the Zimbabwean cholera outbreak caused the deaths of hundreds of Zimbabweans, a similar but separate outbreak occurred in the northern Kunene Region constituency of Epupa. As of 19 December, 3 people had died and 29 had become sick. In May 2008, approximately 15 people died of cholera as well.

== Human rights ==
February 2012, traditional Himba chiefs issued two separate Declarations to the African Union and to the OHCHR of the United Nations.

The first, titled "Declaration of the most affected Ovahimba, Ovatwa, Ovatjimba and Ovazemba against the Orokawe Dam in the Baynes Mountains" outlines the objections from regional Himba chiefs and communities that reside near the Kunene River.

The second, titled "Declaration by the traditional Himba leaders of Kaokoland in Namibia" lists violations of civil, cultural, economic, environmental, social and political rights perpetrated by the Government of Namibia (GoN).

September 2012, the United Nations special rapporteur on the Rights of Indigenous Peoples visited the Himba, and heard their concerns that they do not have recognized traditional authorities, and that they are placed under the jurisdictions of chiefs of neighboring dominant tribes, who make decisions on behalf of the minority communities. In his view, the lack of recognition of traditional chiefs is, in accordance with Namibian law, relates to a lack of recognition of the minority indigenous tribes' communal lands.

November 23, 2012, hundreds of Himba and Zemba from Omuhonga and Epupa region protested in Okanguati against Namibia’s plans to construct a dam in the Kunene River in the Baynes Mountains, against increasing mining operations on their traditional land and human rights violations against them.

In March 25, 2013, over thousand Himba and Zemba people marched in protest again, this time in Opuwo, against the ongoing human rights violations that they endure in Namibia. They expressed their frustration over their traditional chiefs not being recognized as "Traditional Authorities" by the Government of Namibia, Namibia's plans to build the Orokawe dam in the Baynes Mountains at the Cunene River without consulting with the Himba that do not consent to the construction plans, culturally inappropriate education, the illegal fencing of parts of their traditional land, the lack of land rights to the territory that they have lived upon for centuries, and against the implementation of the Communal Land Reform Act of 2002.

== Economy and infrastructure ==
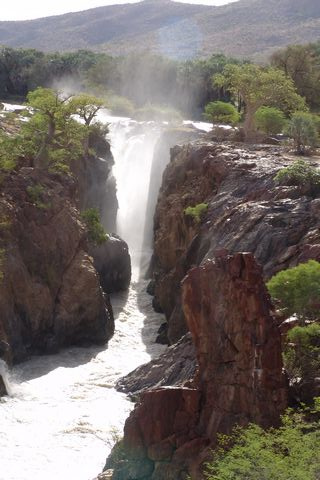
Epupa Falls

Compared to the rest of Namibia, Kunene is relatively underdeveloped. This is due to the mountainous inaccessible geography and the dryness that significantly hinders agriculture.

In 2012, Chinese company Namibia East China Non- Ferrous Investments explored the Kunene region discovering enough a deposit of 2.37 billion tons of iron ore, enough for the next 100 years. A cobalt deposit is being developed by Gecko Opuwo Cobal.

Kunene has 60 schools with a total of 20,332 pupils.

== Gallery ==
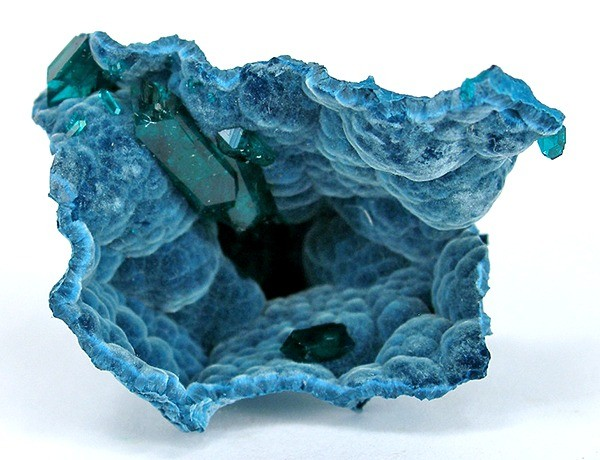
Dioptase (clear green) on Shattuckite (blue), Kaokoveld Plateau, Kunene Region

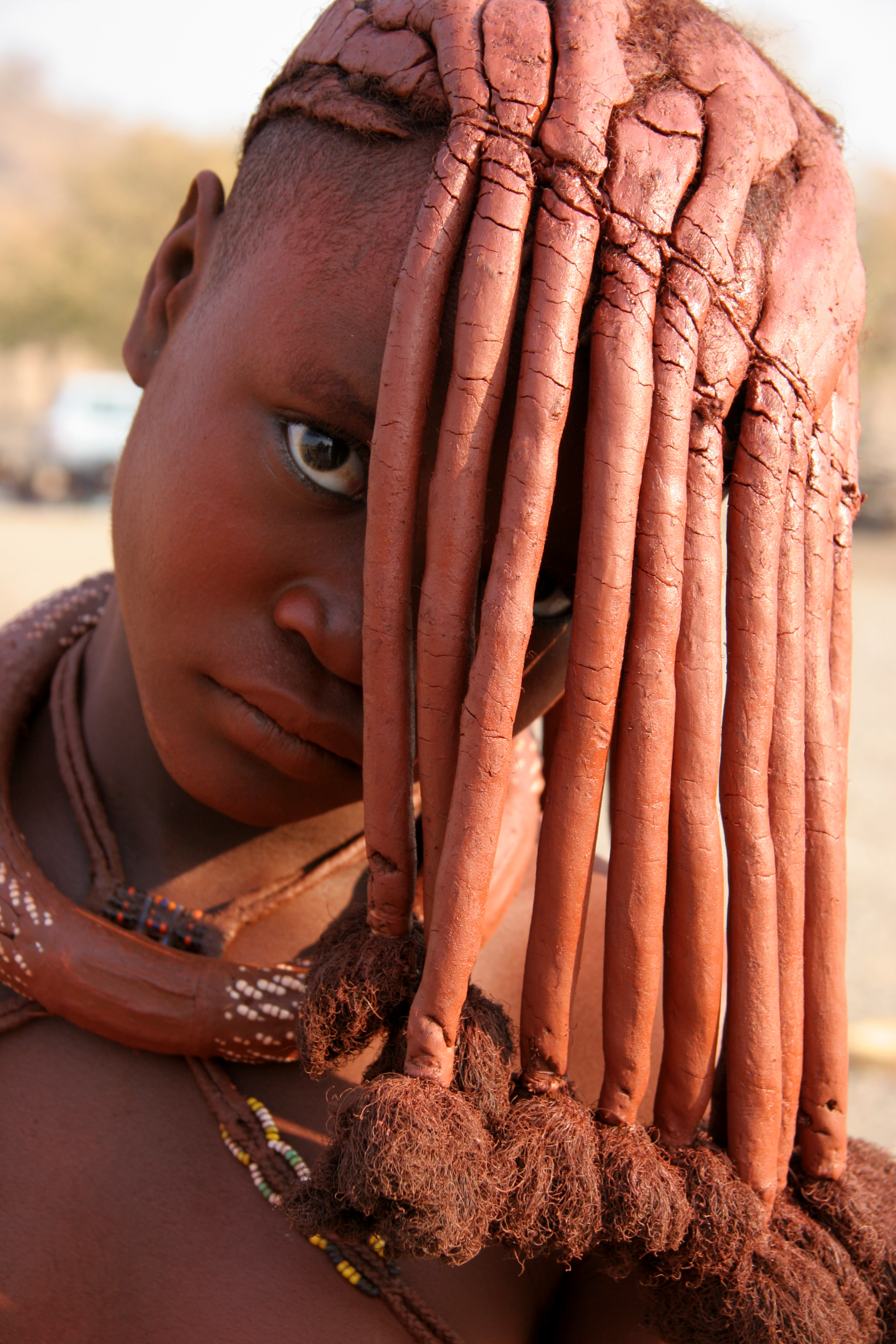
Pubescent Himba girl with hair headdress styled to veil her face
