= List of Etosha National Park placename etymologies =

The names of places in the Etosha National Park are dominated by Hai//om (42%) and Afrikaans (33%). Most of the origins of names are from a compilation by Hu Berry who was a biologist at the Etosha Ecological Institute in the Etosha National Park.

Place	Administration Region	Language of origin	Explanation
Etosha (Khubus)	Okaukuejo	Ndonga	The name Etosha (spelled Etotha in early literature) comes from Ndonga word meaning "Great White Place" referring to the Etosha pan. Alternatively it is also thought to mean "Place of Emptiness"(for the salt pan), or "Lake of Mother's Tears"(referring to grief of a Hai//om mother when her infant died), or "to run falteringly across" (referring to the fatigue an early hunter felt attempting to cross the pan). The Hai//om called the pan Khubus which means "totally bare, white place with lots of dust". The pan was also known as Chums which refers to the noise made by a person's feet when walking on the clay of the pan.
Rooilyn	Otjovasando	Afrikaans	Means "red line" in Afrikaans. The name originated from the fence that was erected in 1961 to contain the spread of foot-and-mouth disease from wild ungulates inside the park to domestic cattle in Kaokoveld.
Soutputs	Otjovasando	Afrikaans	Means "salty well" in Afrikaans. The bore-hole has been closed since 1989, when it dried up, due to its proximity to the park boundary and hence making wildlife vulnerable to poachers.
Karos Conservation Area	Otjovasando	Afrikaans	"Karos" means "skin cloak" or rug. Karos was a farm adjoining the park that was bought by the South-West Africa Administration to provide refuge for rare animal species.
Karosfontein	Otjovasando	Afrikaans	"Fontein" means natural spring in Afrikaans. Karosfontein is a spring in the Karos Conservation Area
Karoshoek	Otjovasando	Afrikaans	"Hoek" means "corner" in Afrikaans. Karoshoek refers to a bore-hole on the north-eastern corner of the Karos farm.
Karosdrink	Otjovasando	Afrikaans	A bore-hole in the Karos Conservation Area
Zebrapomp	Otjovasando	Afrikaans	"Pomp" refers to pump or windmill in Afrikaans. Zebrapomp is watering hole where mountain zebra are frequently seen.
Galton Gate	Otjovasando	English	In the honor of Francis Galton, who along with Charles Andersson were the first Europeans to discover existence of Etosha pan on 29 May 1851.
Zebradam	Otjovasando	Afrikaans	A dam near Galton Gate where mountain zebras are seen frequently.
Sterculia	Otjovasando	Latin	After the Sterculia species are grow in the vicinity
Equinus	Otjovasando	Latin	After the roan antelope (Hippotragus equinus) which were introduced in the area in 1974, when 74 of these animals are airlifted to Etosha National Park from the Kavango Region.
Otjovasando	Otjovasando	Herero	Means "place of the young men" in Herero. The place gets its name because young Herero warriors used to herd their cattle to a natural spring in the area during the winter months. The bravest, and hence young, warriors were chosen because of the presence of dangerous animals like elephants, rhinos and lions.
Otjovasandofontein	Otjovasando	Afrikaans	From a natural spring near Otjovasando
Miernes	Otjovasando	Afrikaans	Means "termite nest" in Afrikaans. It was named so because termites built on top of a bore-well in the area
Renostervlei	Otjovasando	Afrikaans	Means "rhinoceros hollow" because of being frequented by rhinos.
Dinteri	Otjovasando	Latin	Named for an aloe, Aloe dinteri, found in the area.
Aasvoëlbad	Otjovasando	Afrikaans	Means "vulture bath" in Afrikaans. Vultures preferred to drink, bathe and preen in the area before the water-hole was permanently closed due to the proximity to the park boundary.
Leuperdskop	Otjovasando	Afrikaans	Means "leopard's hill" in Afrikaans. Apparently a large male leopard made the hill its home and was a favorite with the early conservators in the area.
Okondethe	Otjovasando	Herero	Means "small place of the honey badger" in the Herero. It was originally spelled as Okondese.
Kowares	Otjovasando	Herero	Implies quenching of thirst from an alcoholic beverage made from a Hyphaene palm.
Klippan	Otjovasando	Afrikaans	Means "stone pan" ("klip" means stone in Afrikaans). It was originally called Klein Kowares (little Kowares).
Omumborombongapan	Otjovasando	Afrikaans + Herero	From "Omumborombongapa", a Herero word for Combretum imberbe
Rateldraf	Otjovasando	Afrikaans	Ratel means honey badger and "draf" refers to its jogging gait in Afrikaans. The waterhole gets its name from a honey badger that lived in a nearby aardvark's hole and was often seen coming to water.
Dolomitepunt	Otjovasando	Afrikaans	"Punt" is point in Afrikaans. Refers to the northernmost point of the dolomite hills in the area.
Omatambo Maowe	Otjovasando	Herero	Means "place behind stones" in Herero from Omatambo (back of) and Omaewe (stones).
Etoshafontein	Otjovasando	Afrikaans	"Fontein" means natural spring in Afrikaans. The place had a spring that migrating elephants from Etosha to Kaokoveld frequently visited.
Onandera	Otjovasando	Herero	Means "place of the bird" after large congregations of birds at the waterhole.
Onangombati (Onangombali)	Otjovasando	Herero	Probably refers to sickle-shaped pod of Acacia erioloba. Alternatively the name could be a corruption of "Onango mbari" which could mean "water is twice as bitter as gall" as "Onango" means gall in Herero.
Onautinda	Otjovasando	Herero	From Herero word "Omutindi" for Moringa trees that grow in the area.
Duineveld	Otjovasando	Afrikaans	Means "dune veld" in Afrikaans. The place is located on Kalahari type sandveld.
19e Breëdtegaard	Otjovasando	Afrikaans	For the road running parallel (and a few kilometers north) to "the 19S latitude" eastwards from Duineveld towards Ozonjuitji m'bari.
Die Kraglyn	Otjovasando	Afrikaans	Means "power line" in Afrikaans. The power line transmits electricity from Kunene river to Windhoek.
Okatjongeama	Otjovasando	Herero	Means "place of the lion" in Herero.
Otjiouhaka	Otjovasando	Herero	Means "place of cattle with white stomachs and hooves" in Herero.
Kalahari	Otjovasando	Afrikaans	After Kalahari though it only vaguely resembles the Kalahari.
Dolomietpoort	Otjovasando	Afrikaans	"Poort" is mountain pass in Afrikaans. The place is located on a mountain pass in the dolomite range of Etosha National Park.
Jakkalswater	Otjovasando	Afrikaans	"Jakkal" means jackal in Afrikaans. The place was named after a drowned black-backed jackal was found in the water trough in the area.
Pioniersdam	Otjovasando	Afrikaans	Named after an adjacent farm called "Pionier" which means pioneer in Afrikaans.
Duikerdrink	Otjovasando	Afrikaans	Named after a common duiker was observed drinking water at this waterhole, which was unusual because duikers rarely drink water.
Okavao	Otjovasando	Herero	Probably from Herero word "oruvao" meaning "place of the shield"
Leeukamp	Otjovasando	Afrikaans	Means "lion camp" in Afrikaans. Lions in western Etosha have the reputation of being the most aggressive in the park and frequented this place.
!Nomab	Otjovasando	Hai//om	Means "root of a plant" after Elephantorrhiza roots that elephants used to dig up in the place.
Olifantsrus	Otjovasando	Afrikaans	Means "elephants' rest" in Afrikaans. In 1983, the place served as a waterhole for a temporary abattoir when there was drought-induced large-scale culling in the park, which resulted in the culling of 525 elephants, 465 gemsbok and 622 springbok.
Toebiroen	Otjovasando	Afrikaans	"Roen" means praise in Afrikaans. The place was named after a Hai//om tracker Tobais who fearlessly walked around a pride of lions to bring a stranded conservator back to safety.
Dorsland	Otjovasando	Afrikaans	Means "thirst land" for the bore-hole that was drilled in the dry area to attract wildlife.
Skerpioenbult	Otjovasando	Afrikaans	Means "scorpion ridge" in Afrikaans. Apparently, a conservator killed a scorpion and threw it into the campfire which resulted in the place swarming with scorpions.
Okoumburu	Otjovasando	Ndonga	Means "small wildebeest" and probably refers to the grassy plains used as birthing grounds by blue wildebeest.
Meyersput	Otjovasando	Afrikaans	"Put" means pit in Afrikaans. It was named after early conservator 'Jaap' Meyer who discovered the pit originally dug up by poachers.
Nêrens	Otjovasando	Afrikaans	Means "nowhere" or "desolate place" in Afrikaans.
Teëspoed	Otjovasando	Afrikaans	Means "place of adversity" and the place was called so because of the hardships faced in the drilling of this borehole.
Mopanie	Otjovasando	Afrikaans	After Mopane trees found in the area
Olifanttrek	Otjovasando	Afrikaans	It is named for a bore-hole that existed on a well-used elephant migration path.
Elandsvlakte	Otjovasando	Afrikaans	Means "Elands' plain" in Afrikaans. It was named for a bore-hole that was frequented by elands
Bitterwater	Otjovasando	Afrikaans	Named for a bore-hole that had bitter taste because of high magnesia content in the water
Duiwelsvuur	Okaukuejo	Afrikaans	Named for a "devilish fire" that ravaged the area in the 1960s.
Sonderkop Pan	Okaukuejo	Afrikaans	Means "without head" for a windmill that kept losing its head wheel due to strong winds.
Arendsnes	Okaukuejo	Afrikaans	Means "eagle's nest" in Afrikaans. Named for a tawny eagle nest that used to be in the area.
Ozonjuitji m'bari	Okaukuejo	Herero	Literally means "two honey bees" in Herero, a play on "two Bs" after the surnames of sponsors of a windmill in the area, H.A. Boettger and L.W. Bergmann.
Charl Marais Dam	Okaukuejo	Afrikaans	Named after a secretary of South-West Africa Administration who obtained the money required to construct a dam. The dam was abandoned in 1976 after it was identified as one of the sources for the spread of anthrax in the park.
Good Hope	Okaukuejo	English	Named after a bore-hole was drilled in the area with skepticism of it being successful to attract wildlife.
Omuramba Onaiso	Okaukuejo	Herero	"Omuramba" means "flooded water course", but meaning of Onaiso is not known. It is the name of an east-west depression that runs for about 25 kilometres (16 mi).
Paradys Pan	Okaukuejo	Afrikaans	Means "paradise" in Afrikaans. Named for picturesque area frequented for camping by patrolling conservators.
Narawandu (Enarovandu)	Okaukuejo	Ndonga	Means "name of the people" referring to the Ovambo tribe.
Narawanduputte	Okaukuejo	Ndonga + Afrikaans	Named for a well that was used by Ovambo people traveling to Outjo through the Etosha National Park
Natukanaoka Pan	Okaukuejo	Ndonga	Means "you need to take long strides to walk here" in Ndonga. This is the second largest pan in the park after the Etosha pan.
Pan Point	Okaukuejo	English	A bore-hole at the southernmost point of a cone-shaped pan.
Panpoint Pan	Okaukuejo	English	A pan named after Pan Point, which incidentally got its name from the pan.
Brakwater	Okaukuejo	Afrikaans	From a bore-hole that existed here that produced very alkaline water
Okahakana	Okaukuejo	Herero	Literally means "to grab something away from a person" but its origin is unknown.
Adamax	Okaukuejo	German	Bore-hole that got its name from its sponsors Ada and Max Kessler. The watering hole has since been closed.
Adamax Pan	Okaukuejo	English	The third largest pan in the park and was named after the Adamax bore-hole located on the edge of the pan.
Leeubron	Okaukuejo	Afrikaans	Means "lion fountain" in Afrikaans. The name was given to the place where a bore-hole was sunk over an existing well dug by troops from German South-West Africa. The artificial water supply has been closed permanently to help prevent habitat degradation. The area got its name when Prof. P. Schoeman, then warden of the park, found an emaciated lioness with five frail cubs. Schoeman shot plains zebra, which are considered abundant, to feed the scare lions. This started the practice of feeding lions at Leeubron by the conservators of the park. Tourists were allowed to join the conservators on Wednesday and Saturday evenings to see the spectacle. The practice was stopped permanently when park authorities realized it was dangerous to tourists who could not be effectively controlled.
Natco	Okaukuejo	English	Named after the sponsors of the bore-hole at the place, National Trading Company of South-West Africa.
Grootvlakte	Okaukuejo	Afrikaans	Means "Great Plain" in Afrikaans. It is the name given to a large grassland that spans nearly 40000 hectares and is a popular summer grazing grounds for zebra and wildebeest.
Eindpaal	Okaukuejo	Afrikaans	Means "last (fence) post" in Afrikaans. It is the named after an adjoining farm that was originally called Eindpaal (now called Stillerus).
Grünewald	Okaukuejo	German	Means "green forest" for the brief verdant setting of Mopane trees that are found at the eastern edge of Grootvlakte.
Sprokieswoud	Okaukuejo	Afrikaans	Means "fairytale forest" or "ghost forest" after the Moringa trees that are found in the area. It is also an unusual place for Moringa trees on a plain since they seem to prefer rocky hillsides.
Ondundozonananandana	Okaukuejo	Herero	It is a composite of the Herero words for mountain(Ondundu), boy(omuzandona) and calves(ondana). It literally means "mountain where a boy took the calves" but probably refers to an old folklore of a boy who herded cattle in the mountains and never returned because he and his cattle fell prey to a leopard. It was called "Leopard Hills" in English. The Hai//om called the mountains "Gabgas" from the sound made when munching on the resin of the trees growing there.
Stark's Pan	Okaukuejo	English	Named after a conservator, Peter Stark, who got his vehicle stuck in the seasonally flooded saline pan east of the tarred road to Okaukuejo.
Andersson Gate	Okaukuejo	English	Named after explorer Charles Andersson, who along with Francis Galton were the first Europeans to discover the existence of the Etosha pan on 29 May 1851.
Ombika	Okaukuejo	Herero	Refers to hand picks used to remove rocks from the natural spring to make its water more accessible. It could also mean the picks that would be required to open up the water source when it is dry and mud is as hard as rock.
Gaseb	Okaukuejo	Hai//om	Pronounced as !Gaseb. Probably means scooping water from a deep hole, or the sense of hearing. Although, it is also believed to be named after a Hai//om who had gone bald, which is a rare occurrence.
Nebrownii	Okaukuejo	Latin	Named after an Acacia, Acacia nebrownii, found in the area.
Okaukuejo	Okaukuejo	Ndonga	Pronounced "O-ka-kwi-you", it literally means "woman who has a child every year". Hai//om called the place "Thekwi" (or ǂHaiub) after the Salsola, Salsola etoshensis, around the area. Okaukuejo has been the park headquarters since 1955 when tourism formally began in Etosha National Park.
Eugene's Pan	Okaukuejo	English	Named in memory of nature conservator Eugene Cronjè who, with four colleagues and the pilot, was tragically killed during an aerial census on 1 June 1982 near Halali
Wolfsnes	Okaukuejo	Afrikaans	Means "hyena's den" using the Afrikaans words "wolf", meaning hyena, and "nes" meaning nest or den. The area was frequented by spotted hyenas and hence its name.
Okondeka	Okaukuejo	Herero	Name for the perennial fountain flowing into the Etosha pan. Okondeka means "place of sedges" after the Cyperaceae found in the area. It could also mean "place of small dog" and it is not known if it refers to African wild dogs or a domesticated dog. There are at least two other meanings based on spelling variation from early literature: Ondeka(Ndonga) means "creeping plant" referring to Odyssea grass found in the area, and Onkondeka(Ndonga) which means "ambush" referring to the practice of lions in the area which use the grassy dune hummocks as hiding places for hunting. Onkondeka probably has its origins from a tragic incident in 1950 when four Ovambos traveling on foot were ambushed by lions when drawing water. One of the men was killed immediately but three escaped to a tree that stood where the tourist parking lot currently stands. The lions devoured the victim and came for the three men on the short tree and successfully pulled down two more men. The fourth man was out of reach but the lions settled down under the tree, patiently waiting for the man to come down. The man was eventually rescued by a policeman on patrol after three days.
Logan's Island	Okaukuejo	English	A small grassy island in the Etosha pan that is named after American geographer Prof. Richard Logan of the University of California who worked in the parks of South-West Africa.
Okotumare	Okaukuejo	Herero	Refers to the bitter taste of water in the area
Ekuma River	Okaukuejo	Ndonga	Means "soil" or "clod" and refers to the hardness of the river-bed when it dries up after a brief run during the rainy season. The Ekuma forms a series of toxic saline pools when it dries up and is known to kill animals that drink from the pools.
Oshigambo River	Okaukuejo	Ndonga	Means "the river that comes from far away"
Haas Eiland	Okaukuejo	Afrikaans	Means "hare island" and refers to the frequently seen scrub hares in this shrubby island on the Etosha pan.
Kapupuhedi	Okaukuejo	Ndonga	Means "place with small earth-worm mounds" but is also known as Tsam in Hai//om, which means "soft mud or soil". Another name for the place is Tsamsa which in Hai//om means "place which the winds blow closed" referring the endless vista of the Etosha pan.
Ondongab	Okaukuejo	Ndonga	Origin not known, but may refer to Ndonga-speaking Ovambo people. Early literature refers to the place as Ondeka which means "creeping plant", after Odyssea grass found in the area.
Gonob (!Gomob)	Okaukuejo	Hai//om	May refer to "place at the point (of the peninsula)" or "eye of the elephant" from the Hai//om word "gono" (eye of elephant). Another name is !Goro lute which could mean limestone rocks.
Homob	Okaukuejo	Hai//om	One interpretation means "place nearby the point (of the peninsula)". Another interpretation means "big locusts" or "there not big locusts" depending on a slight variation in the pronunciation, referring to the "eyes" formed in the depression.
Gemsbokvlakte	Okaukuejo	Afrikaans	Means "gemsbok plain" in Afrikaans and is the name for an artificial waterhole which provides for game viewing on the grassland. Hai//om called the place as Khari-!ganos which means "small open plain", or //Khariros which means "small pan of water". Gemsbokvlakte was the first waterhole to be converted from wind power to solar power with a diesel generator on standby.
Olifantsbad	Okaukuejo	Afrikaans	Means "elephants' bath" in Afrikaans and is the name for an artificial waterhole created on a natural depression in the area, where elephants come regularly to drink and bathe. The Hai//om name for the place was ǂGaseb which means "scoop water from a deep hole".
Aus	Okaukuejo	Afrikaans	Means "out" referring to its remote location, and was the furthest point tourists could travel to. Aus also means bitter in Hai//om and it is not known if that had any role in the name of the place. However it is also called /Os, meaning "salty water", by some Hai//om,
Charagas	Halali	Hai//om	Implies "fine stone grit" and is known by other names Karagas, //Haraxas, Kora or Thiachab.
Gobaub	Halali	Hai//om	Pronounced as "!Goboab" or "/Opa-op". It comes from the word "!Gobas" which means loincloth. The place apparently got its name when a Hai//om was charged by an elephant and lost his loincloth in his attempt to escape. This is the oldest known water point in Etosha.
Tgumses	Halali	Hai//om	Also called !Gomses and means "soil deep in the hole is always wet"
!Abba-chub	Halali	Hai//om	Means "red soil" for the soil in the area.
!Harib	Halali	Hai//om	Probably means looking for a place to camp. It could refer to a mouse because of the rock formation that resembles a crouching mouse. The last two free-roaming Hai//om were found in this place in 1967 and taken to live in Halali. One adapted to civilization and the other returned to the bush and was never seen again.
Aasvöel-koppie	Halali	Afrikaans	Means "vulture hill" and got its name from the nest of lappet-faced vultures on the hill. It was also known as Witkoppen, which means "white hill" in Afrikaans, after the whitish rocks in the area.
Sueda	Halali	Latin	Gets its name from Suaeda bushes found in the area. Early literature called the place Ciouiob which means "stones made of salt" in Hai//om.
Charitsaub	Halali	Hai//om	Originally called Geikoitsaub and means "large waterhole"
Salvadora	Halali	Latin	Named after a solitary Salvadora persica found at this natural spring. It was previously known as ǂKharitsaub or ǂAritsaub which meant "small waterhole" in Hai//om.
ǂHoibdis	Halali	Hai//om	Refers to the Hai//om word for Grewia bushes.
Ani-/Us	Halali	Hai//om	Means "where vultures bathed and preened, leaving feathers" in Hai//om
Xunabes	Halali	Hai//om	Refers to the sound of boiling water and is the name given to a natural spring in the area
Peter's Pan	Halali	English	Originally called /Gases which refers to the flowers of Acacia nebrownii. It renamed after Peter Lind, a nature conservator at Halali.
scoring Tkaigab	Halali	Hai//om	Means "place where sun is so hot you cannot even sit in the shade of trees", and is also known as SoreǂAxab.
Rietfontein	Halali	Afrikaans	Means "reed fountain" and was named by the Dorsland trekkers in 1876. It was originally called //Naseneb or //Asonheb which describes the action of unloading baggage after a long journey. The ruins of the building near the site are that of a bone meal plant built by game warden Prof. P. Schoeman who decided to cull plains zebra and blue wildebeest in 1952. Official records indicate 293 zebras and 122 wildebeest were processed here, but conservationists claimed thousands had been culled and successfully forced the plant's closure during the same year
Renosterkom pad	Halali	Afrikaans	From Afrikaans words "renoster" (rhinoceros), "kom" (depression) and "pad" (road). Also known as "rhino drive" where black rhinoceros are frequently sighted.
Halali	Halali	German	Comes from the Germany where hunters sounded a "Halali horn" to mark the end of a hunt. The name was given to the rest camp in Etosha National Park in 1967 to mean "hunting has ended within the national park".
Halali Koppie	Halali	German + Afrikaans	Refers to a dolomite hill within the Halali camp. It was originally called //Ogomabes which means "place where many people died" in Hai//om.
Tsinaib (ǂTsinab)	Halali	Hai//om	Probably refers to the sound made by sneezing and is the name of a waterhole.
//Gam !Na ǂNaosoneb	Halali	Hai//om	Means "place from which the waterhole(Tsinaib) can be seen"
Tweekooppies	Halali	Afrikaans	Means "two small hills" and refers to conical dolomite hills near the Halali rest camp. These hills were originally known as Tsina-!Gomab which means "hills near Tsinaib spring".
Helio	Halali	German	A bore-hole named for a German heliograph station located on top of the Tweekoppies. It was used by soldiers to signal comrades at Namutoni.
Helio Hills	Halali	English	Alternative name for Tweekoppies
Gamgoas Koppie	Halali	Hai//om + Afrikaans	"Gamgoas" means "place where lots of lions are found" and "koppie" means hill in Afrikaans. It was apparently a popular hill used by lions to give birth.
Xamxarob	Halali	Hai//om	Means "ridge that is near to and smaller than Gamgoas"
Elandsdraai koppies	Halali	Afrikaans	Means "eland detour hills" and refers to the T-junction made by Rhino Drive, Eland Drive and the road to Halali.
//Khus	Halali	Hai//om	From the Hai//om word for Acacia kirkii found in the area.
/Goses	Halali	Hai//om	Refers to the Hai//om word for the sedge that grew in the area
Geikoitsaub	Halali	Hai//om	Means "large waterhole"
ǂKharitsaub	Halali	Hai//om	Means "small waterhole"
Xoroses	Halali	Hai//om	From the noise that water makes when moving over rocks
!NabaǂKhus	Halali	Hai//om	Means "rhino food" and refers to the spring west of the Etosha lookout. It could probably refer to the plants that rhinos eat or for the a rhino that was killed there.
Naumses (ǂNu=//amses)	Halali	Hai//om	Means "black water" referring the color of the murky water produced by a natural spring in an area with dark soil.
Koerigas	Halali	Hai//om	Means "place of the aloe" using the Hai//om word "korisa" (aloe). It is named for aloe growing in the vicinity of a natural spring.
Etosha Lookout	Halali	English	Name for the vista point at the end of the road that leads out into the Etosha pan
/Uses	Halali	Hai//om	Means "very salty water" and refers to the seepage close to the Etosha Lookout road. It is also called /Oses or /Huruses.
!Gao-Khaob	Halali	Hai//om	"!Gao" means "to cut" in Hai//om and refers to the indentation made by the pan into the mopane woodland.
Au-//Gamson (Au-//Gamseb)	Halali	Hai//om	Means "bitter water"
Goas or /Khoas	Halali	Hai//om	It could mean "noise when walking over rocks", "waterhole between rocks" or "overflowing water" and is the name for a waterhole.
Noniams (/Honi-ams or /Uniams)	Halali	Hai//om	From the Hai//om word for Boscia tree (Boscia foetida) found in the area. It could also mean "bad breath" referring to the smell of water near the area.
!Khaneb	Halali	Hai//om	Comes from the Hai//om word "!Khan" which means eland.
Koinseb	Halali	Hai//om	Originally called !Goiseb or /Kuiseb which means "we are brothers" probably refers to the previous existence of an artesian spring along with the existent natural spring. It could also mean a place where families congregated.
Kameeldperdkoppie	Halali	Afrikaans	Means "giraffe hill" in Afrikaans. It was probably called !Hoseb or !Gosib by the Hai//om but its original name is not known.
Nau-Obes (!Nau-Obes)	Halali	Hai//om	It means "you always turn back to the water which is pleasant tasting" and alternatively means "I was not at this place when the event or argument you speak off took place"
Hestria Koppie	Halali	Afrikaans	Means "Hestria hill" after the Hestria farm adjoining the park. The Hai//om name for the place was //Kuxas meaning "place of many thorns"
Vredekoppies	Namutoni	Afrikaans	From the Afrikaans word "vrede" which means "peace" and refers to the dolomite outcrops on the southern boundary of the park.
Tkai-Tkab (ǂXai !Xab)	Namutoni	Hai//om	Refers to the act of drawing water from deep hole, using a long rope and a scoop. It is the name given to this subterranean lake that is probably connected to Otjikoto and Otjiguinas.
Dunagaries (Dun!aries)	Namutoni	Hai//om	Probably means "unexpected discovery" referring to the unexpected discovery of a spring. The original name was probably Xaga-gabakab after a Hai//om named Xaga got lost looking for water.
Kamaseb (//Amaseb)	Namutoni	Hai//om	Means "many hartebeest" referring to red hartebeest that frequented the area
Tsam (Tsham)	Namutoni	Hai//om	Means "crumbly soil" and refers to a remote seasonal natural spring.
Hartebeesdraai	Namutoni	Afrikaans	Means "Hartebeest detour" and refers to a section between the Goas and Springbokfontein for red hartebeest that frequent the area
Agab (ǂAgab)	Namutoni	Hai//om	Means "place of many reeds"
Batia	Namutoni	Afrikaans	A small natural spring named after Bernabè de la Bat, a biologist and warden at Etosha National Park, who was the first director of Nature Conservation in South-West Africa
Springbokfontein	Namutoni	Afrikaans	Means "springbok fountain" and is a larger natural spring than nearby Batia. It was originally called /Arixas or !Arighas and their interpretations are not clear.
ǂOs (!Osa)	Namutoni	Hai//om	Refers to the salt deposited by the natural spring in the area
Kleinrivier	Namutoni	Afrikaans	Means "small river" refers to a seasonal river that drains into the Etosha pan
Poacher's Point	Namutoni	English	It was a popular spot for poachers because it was a good vantage point to hunt game as well as spot approaching conservators well in advance
Pelican Island	Namutoni	English	Name for the largest island on the Etosha pan and served as nesting grounds for white pelicans.
Okerfontein	Namutoni	Afrikaans	Means "ochre fountain" after the yellowish-brown color of the water from the perennial natural spring. It was called !Gamob or /Am-op by the Hai//om.
Miershoop	Namutoni	Afrikaans	Means "termite hill". It was called !Gwasa in Hai//om referring to the sharp curve of the road at which it stood before being destroyed by a speeding vehicle.
Ngobib (!Njobeb or /Nobeb)	Namutoni	Hai//om	Literally means "the water becomes less" but is sometimes referred to as "waterhole of the snakes" because of frequent encounters with the reptiles in the vicinity
Kalkheuwel	Namutoni	Afrikaans	Means "limestone hill" after the calcite ridges in the area. It was previously known as /Narubis or //Harubes (to creep) in Hai//om.
Chudop	Namutoni	Hai//om	Chudop means "black mud". Its original name was probably Aub (the name for another waterhole)
Aub (/Chaub)	Namutoni	Hai//om	Means "fountain". Its original name was probably "/Ciob" meaning "many stones in the water" and Aub was probably the name for Chudop.
Doringdraai	Namutoni	Afrikaans	Means "thorny turn" for the camelthorn trees in the area.
Koingas (!Caucaghas or !Cauaxas)	Namutoni	Hai//om	Means "strong bulrushes" after the Typha bulrush (Typha capensis) in the area
Numeros (!Nameros)	Namutoni	Hai//om	Means "we love this waterhole"
Namutoni	Namutoni	Ndonga	It means "an elevated place". It was historically known as Omutjamatinda, or Onamutune. Hai//om referred to the area as !Namob meaning "place of pleasure". However, it is also known as /Am-op meaning "no love in this place" probably after clashes with Ovambo and German troops.
Klein Namutoni	Namutoni	Afrikaans	Means "little Namutoni". It was probably called ǂKhari-!Namob by the Hai//om
Leeudrink	Namutoni	Afrikaans	Means "lion drink" probably referring to the waterhole where lions frequently came for a drink
Dik-dik drive (Bloubokdraai)	Namutoni	Afrikaans	The damara dik-dik is called "Bloubok" in Afrikaans, and are frequently seen in the area
von Lindequist Gate	Namutoni	English	Named in honor of Friedrich von Lindequist who created the Game Reserve Number 2 which later became Etosha National Park. The Hai//om called the place ǂGoa or //Garus (hole with water at the bottom).
Twee Palms	Namutoni	Afrikaans	Named for the twin Makalani palms that stand at the site. It was called !Chuaba by the Hai//om after the muddy waters of the natural spring. It is also the site where one of the last records of African buffalo in the park when lions were seen with a carcass of a young bull in the late 1950s.
Fischer's Pan	Namutoni	Afrikaans	Named for Lieutenant Adolf Fischer, a German cavalry commander of Namutoni. It was previously known as Onzila (Ndonga - place of the loaded gun) and Kubush (Hai//om - white with lots of dust).
Aroe	Namutoni	Hai//om	Refers to an Albizia tree (Albizia anthelmintica) found in the area.
Okevis	Namutoni	Ndonga	Probably means "from under the ground" referring the springs
Leeunes	Namutoni	Afrikaans	Means "lion's den" or "lion's haunt", from frequent encounters with lions in the area
Tsumcor	Namutoni	English	An abbreviation for Tsumeb Corporation, a mining company that donated the windmill for the waterhole.
Kameeldoring	Namutoni	Hai//om	Named for the camelthorn trees. Also known as Ubares in Hai//om.
Mushara (Omushara)	Namutoni	Ndonga	From the Ndonga name for Terminalia trees that occur in the vicinity
Stinkwater	Namutoni	Afrikaans	Meaning "stinking water" after the smell and taste of water occurring in the area. It is also known as !Garubib in Hai//om referring to an old Ziziphus tree that probably stood in the area.
Oshanana	Namutoni	Ndonga	Probably means "to be pulled by animals" to refer the act of drawing water from shallow wells in the area. Hai//om called it !Nasan-!nanis which means "go away from this place (it's not yours)".
Andoni	Namutoni	Ndonga	Origin not known. Probably refers to the extensive plain. Hai//om called the place Kashana which means "plain".
Beisebvlakte	Namutoni	Hai//om + Afrikaans	"Beiseb" refers to the breakup of herds when animals are hunted. The name implies the place was frequently used as hunting grounds by Hai//om and Ovambo.
Acacia	Namutoni	Latin	Named for the Acacia species
Makalane	Namutoni	Afrikaans	After the Makalani palms that were plentiful in the area. The Hai//om called the place !Nxai-!Xubis meaning "place where many giraffes are found".
King Nehale Iya Mpingana Gate	Namutoni	English	After the Chief Nehale Mpingana who defeated the German army at Fort Namutoni in 1904.
