= Namutoni Airport =

Airport in Namibia

- IATA: NNI; ICAO: FYNA

Summary
- Airport type: Public
- Serves: Namutoni
- Elevation AMSL: 3,579 ft / 1,091 m
- Coordinates: 18°48′40″S 16°55′30″E

Map
- Location of the airport in Namibia

Runways
| Direction | Length | | Surface |
| Direction | m | ft | Surface |
|---|---|---|---|
| 06/24 | 1,262 | 4,140 | Unpaved |
| 15/33 | 1,196 | 3,924 | Unpaved |
- Source: GCM Google Maps

Namutoni Airport (IATA: NNI, ICAO: FYNA) is an airfield serving Namutoni and the Etosha National Park in Namibia. Namutoni is an entrance gate located to the east of the park.

== See also ==
- List of airports in Namibia
- Transport in Namibia
