= Haiǁom people =

Indigenous ethnic group of Namibia

The Haiǁom (Haixom) are a San people of Namibia. They speak the Haiǁom–ǂAakhoe dialect of the Khoekhoe dialect continuum.

== Background ==
The letter ⟨ǁ⟩ in the name represents a lateral click consonant like spurring on a horse, not a double L.

According to the official census there were 7,506 Haiǁom speakers living in northern Namibia in 1991 but as with all figures on people and languages of low reputation this count is not very reliable. According to other sources the number of speakers reaches 16,000.

Many speakers of Haiǁom have maintained an unusual cultural profile as hunter-gatherers. Striking features include healing trance dances, hunting magic and intensive usage of wild plant and insect food, a unique kinship and naming system, frequent storytelling, and the use of a landscape-term system for spatial orientation.

== See also ==
- Original People's Party of Namibia, a political party in colonial Namibia led by Theophilus Soroseb, a member of the Haiǁom and Ovambo groups
