= Red Line (Namibia) =

Veterinary cordon fence in Namibia

The "Red Line" in 1966

The Red Line, also referred to as the veterinary cordon fence, is a pest-exclusion fence separating northern Namibia from the central and southern regions. It encases several northern regions: Oshana Region, Kavango East Region, Omusati Region, Zambezi Region, Omaheke Region, Kunene Region, and parts of the Khomas and Oshikoto Regions. Most of these farms are fenced in and are accessible by constructed farm roads. South of the fence today are commercial farms where the farmers, many of whom are white, own the land. North of the line, on the other hand, all farm land is communal and operated mostly by black farmers. Livestock is not constrained by fences and often ventures onto roads. The red line is a highly guarded line which has roadblocks to check every vehicle which passes. The red line is the reason for Namibia's unique status to export meat across the European Union.

== History ==
The demarcation was created in 1896 in the hope of containing a rinderpest outbreak in the Imperial German colony of South West Africa. Its name stems from the depiction in red ink on a 1911 map created by the German colonial administration. Fort Namutoni was built as a police station to control north–south travel of the indigenous population and their livestock. The line continued to Okaukuejo in the west and Otjituuo in the east. Nevertheless, the epidemic reached Windhoek in 1897, wiping out half of the cattle population of the OvaHerero people.

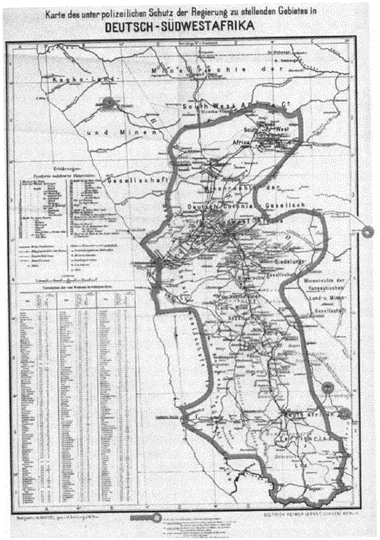
1907, First Police Zone

The demarcation became a political boundary in 1907, after the Reichstag in Berlin passed a resolution in 1905 during the Herero Wars stating that police protection in German South West Africa "should be restricted to the smallest possible area focusing on those regions where our economic interests tend to coalesce". The border reflected areas of colonial control, and was already monitored for animal health purposes. The excluded northern areas were largely left to indirect colonial rule through traditional authorities. Passage between the two zones was then restricted for individuals as well as for animals. This led to different political and economic outcomes for the northern Ovambo people and the more centrally located Herero people.

The Red Line was moved several times. A physical fence was only built in the early 1960s, and from then on used to isolate foot-and-mouth disease outbreaks in the North from the farms in the South. As during German colonialisation, it also served to facilitate the apartheid movement's restrictions and influence on people.

== Location ==
The fence stretches across the north of the country and has often been slightly modified over the years. Currently it runs north of Palmwag, past Okaukuejo, along the southern border of the Etosha Pan, through Tsintsabis and eastwards to Otjituuo (east of Grootfontein). North of the line lies about a third of Namibia's land surface.

== Removing the line ==
Livestock north of the Red Lines may not be sold overseas, while farmers in the South can sell their meat anywhere. Furthermore, even to access markets in South Africa and the rest of Namibia, animals from north of the fence must be quarantined for 21 days, raising the cost of their marketing. Subsequently, animals are usually slaughtered and sold without crossing the veterinary cordon fence. The issues of the red line restrictions have become controversial amidst a 2008 meat market boom. Since the Independence of Namibia in the 1990s, the government has been fighting to remove the Red Line and allow prosperity in these regions. The aim is to build infrastructure, deconcentrate farms and promote the building of farms on virgin lands. Since this line has been deeply embedded in political and historical issues, the government has proposed uprooting it to the Angolan border. This has caused some concern that the disease will spread to uninfected areas, although areas like Kunene have not had outbreaks in over 30 years and are advocating for this line movement. There were three outbreaks of foot and mouth disease in Namibia in 2020, all north of the line, the first on 8 August and the second on 13 August in the Caprivi. The third occurred in the Oshikoto Region on 28 December.

== See also ==
- 1971–72 Namibian contract workers strike
