= Namutoni =

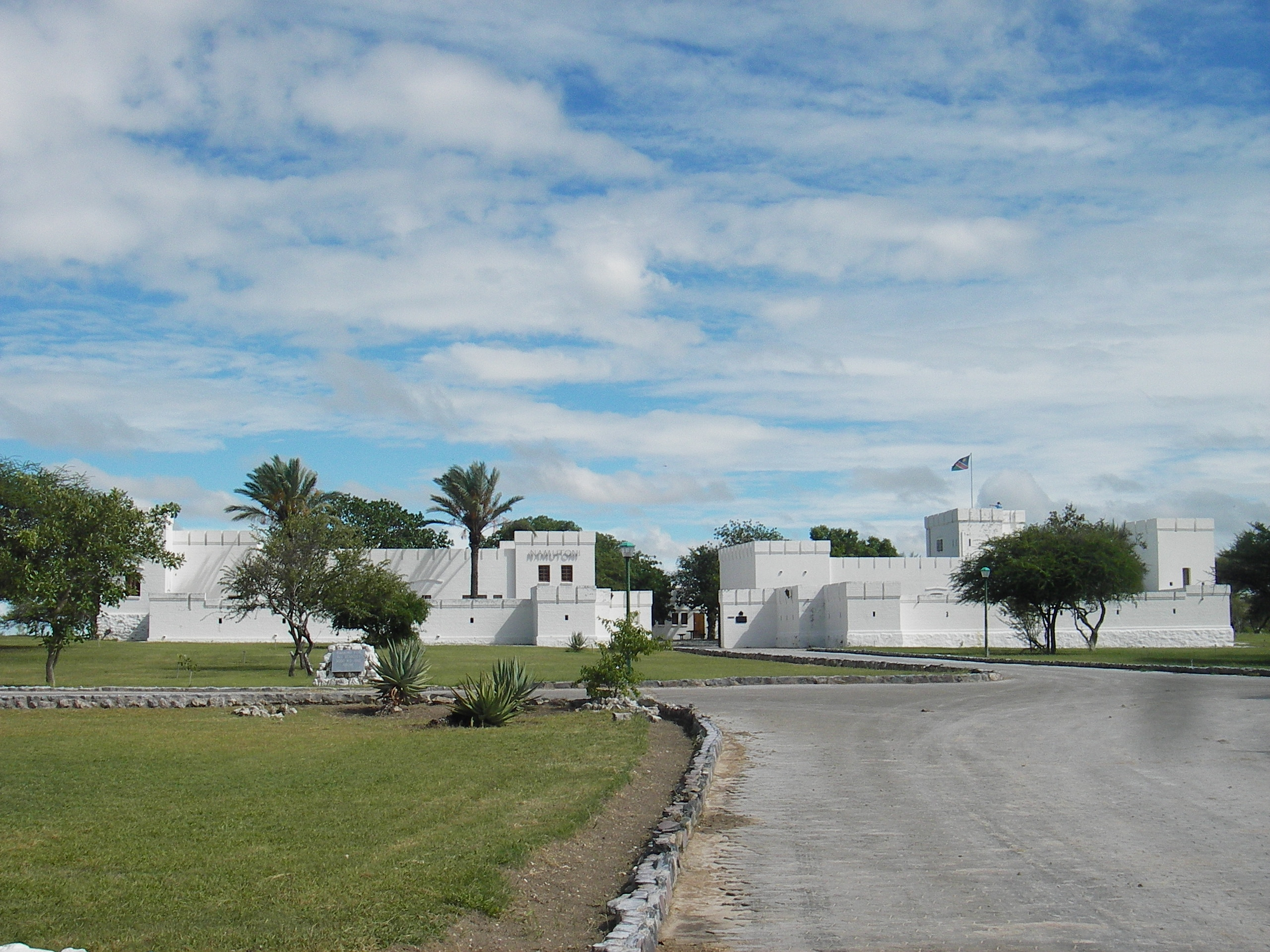
- Fort Namutoni

- Location in Namibia
- Coordinates: 18°48′S 16°59′E
- Country: Namibia
- Region: Oshikoto Region
- Time zone: UTC+1 (South African Standard Time)

Namutoni is a restcamp on the eastern edge of the Etosha pan in the Oshikoto Region in northern Namibia. The adjoining Von Lindequist Gate about 10km east is one of the entrance gates to the Etosha National Park.

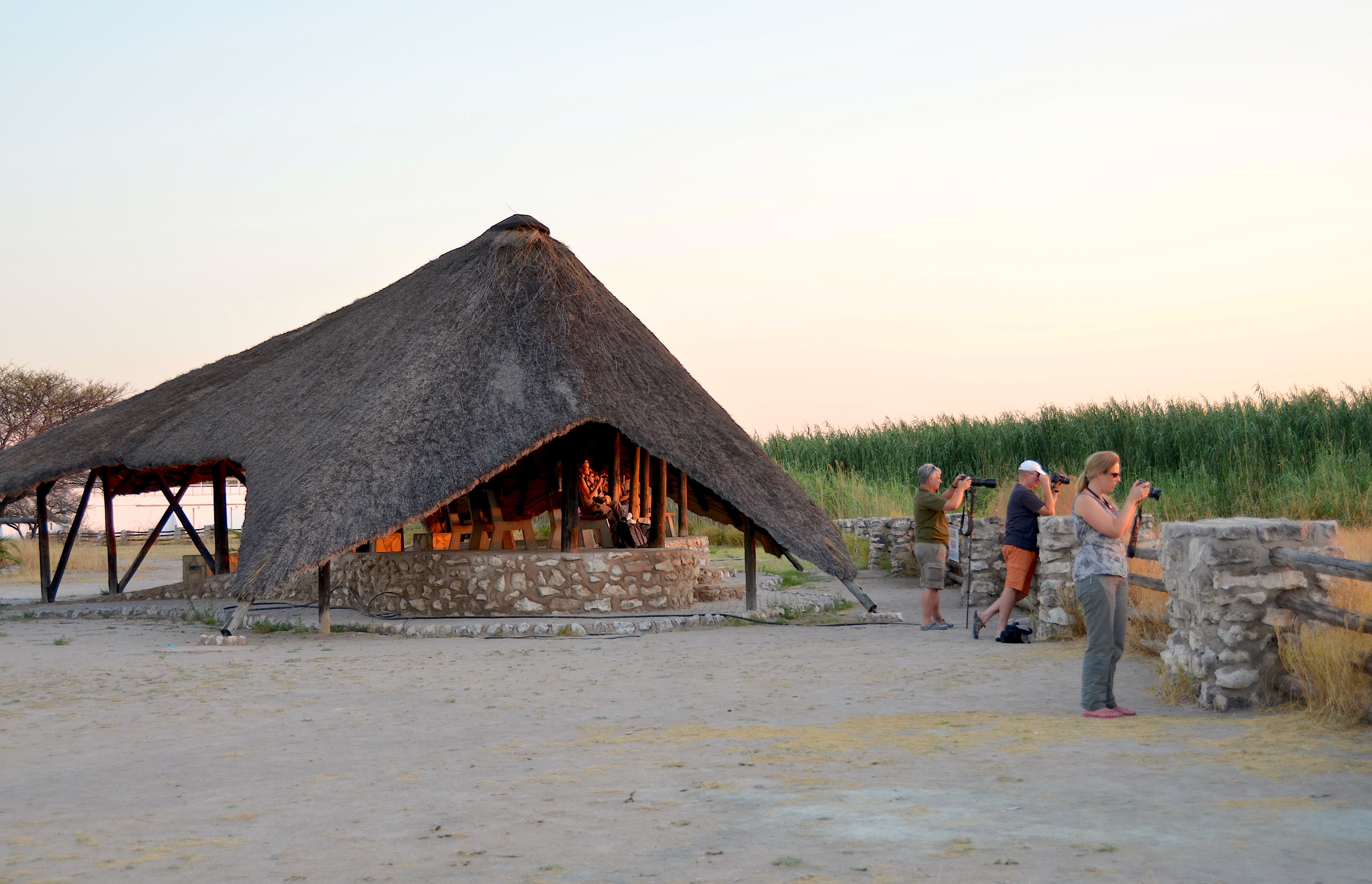
Shelter for wildlife observation at Namutoni

The most prominent structure at Namutoni is Fort Namutoni, built in 1896. It was originally a German Police post and, as part of the Red Line, a veterinary control point. The Red Line at that time extended to Okaukuejo in the west and Otjituuo in the east. Later Namutoni was used to hold English prisoners in World War I and later served as a police post and then a south african army base. The original fort was destroyed in 1904 following the Battle of Namutoni and rebuilt a year or two later. Fort Namutoni was declared a National Monument in 1947 by the South West Africa Monuments Council. The current fort was restored to its present state in 1957 and served as a lodge, stopover, and view point for visitors to Etosha National Park for several decades. However, the fort is currently unused as bigger and more comfortable restcamp facilities were built near the fort.

The restcamp also features the King Nehale waterhole.

The Namutoni Airport, is close by and provides a dirt landing strip mainly used by wildlife and emergency services.

== See also ==
- Okaukuejo
