= Etosha Ecological Institute =

Organisation of the Ministry of Environment and Tourism (Namibia)

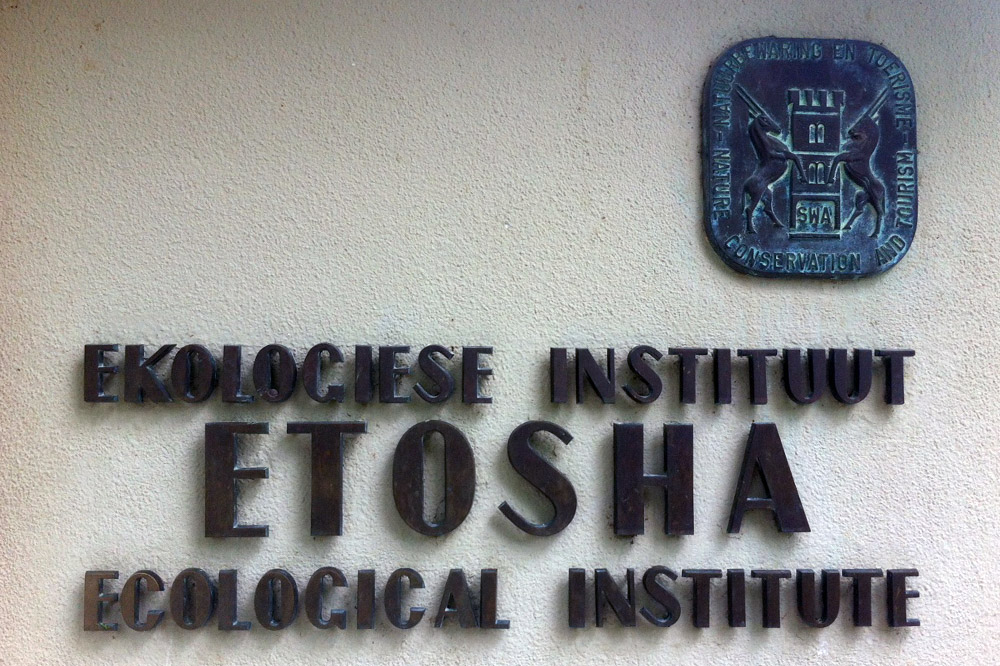

Agency overview
- Formed: April 1, 1974
- Headquarters: Okaukuejo, Namibia
- Agency executives: Boas Erckie, Deputy Director; J. Werner Kilian, Chief Conservation Scientist
- Parent agency: Ministry of Environment and Tourism, Namibia
- Website: met.gov.na

The Etosha Ecological Institute (EEI) is an organization within the Ministry of Environment and Tourism in Namibia that manages all research activities within the Etosha National Park. It was formally opened on 1 April 1974 by Adolf Brinkmann of the South-West Africa Administration. The EEI is headquartered at Okaukuejo within the Etosha National Park.
