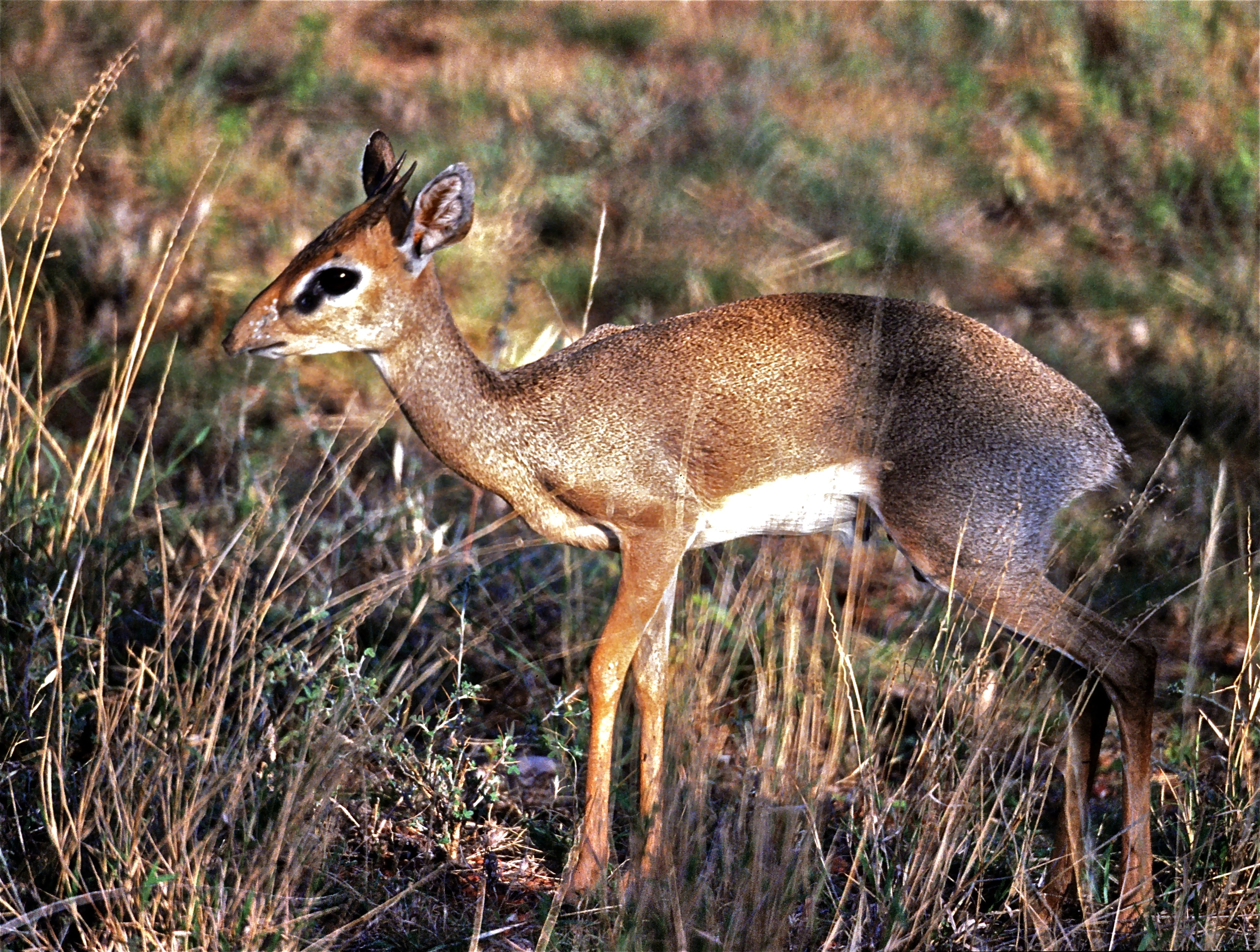
- Günther's dik-dik at Samburu National Reserve, Kenya

Conservation status
- Least Concern (IUCN 3.1)

Scientific classification
- Kingdom: Animalia
- Phylum: Chordata
- Class: Mammalia
- Order: Artiodactyla
- Family: Bovidae
- Subfamily: Antilopinae
- Genus: Madoqua
- Species: M. guentheri

Binomial name
- Madoqua guentheri Thomas, 1894
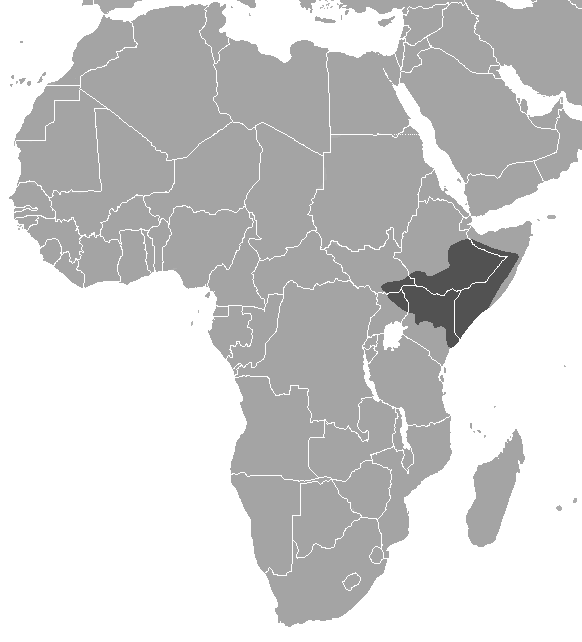
- The range of Günther's dik-dik

= Günther's dik-dik =

Species of mammal

Günther's dik-dik (Madoqua guentheri) is a small antelope found in arid zones of East Africa.

== Description ==
Günther's dik-dik is one of the smallest ungulates, weighing 3–5 kilograms (6.6–11.0 lb) when fully grown. It has a yellowish-gray to reddish-brown coat, black hooves, small heads with long necks and large ears with white insides. Belly, chin, breast, throat and inner thighs are cream or white. The tail is short (~3–5 cm). Males are horned, with horn length (~9.8 cm) varying between individuals. Although the horn cores are only present in males, gender identification can be difficult from a distance. Females are larger and lack horns.

Four subspecies have been proposed based on size and pelage features, but have not yet been analyzed genetically.

== Distribution and habitat ==
The species is found in the lowlands of Ethiopia, most of the northern and eastern regions of Kenya, Somalia excluding specific regions of the coast, limited regions of southeastern Sudan, and northeastern Uganda. They avoid coastal regions. Typical habitat includes low thicket-type vegetation in thornbush, savanna grassland and riverine woodland biomes, and extends to disturbed and overgrazed areas. Habitat overlaps with other small antelope species such as Kirk's dik-dik.

== Ecology ==
Günther's dik-dik is a browser rather than a grazer, feeding mainly on the leaves, flowers, stems, fruits and seeds of non-grasses. The species feeds on plants close to the ground, due to its small stature. It is primarily diurnal, with activity peaks from dawn until mid-morning and mid-afternoon until after dark. The species is monogamous; parents and calves do not form family groups for prolonged periods, and the calf is driven out at an early age to fend for itself. Only a single calf is born at a time. The species does not breed seasonally and can have late gestation periods.

While it has a limited vocal repertoire, the species has been shown to make use of the alarm calls of other species, for example responding with increased vigilance or flight behaviour to the alarm calls of the white-bellied go-away-bird.

== Conservation ==
The species is classified as Least Concern by the IUCN, as it appears to be common throughout its range. Total population size is estimated as at least 500,000 individuals. It is hunted for meat, but not commercially. Habituation to human presence may have a negative fitness effect on individuals, but this has not yet been verified.
