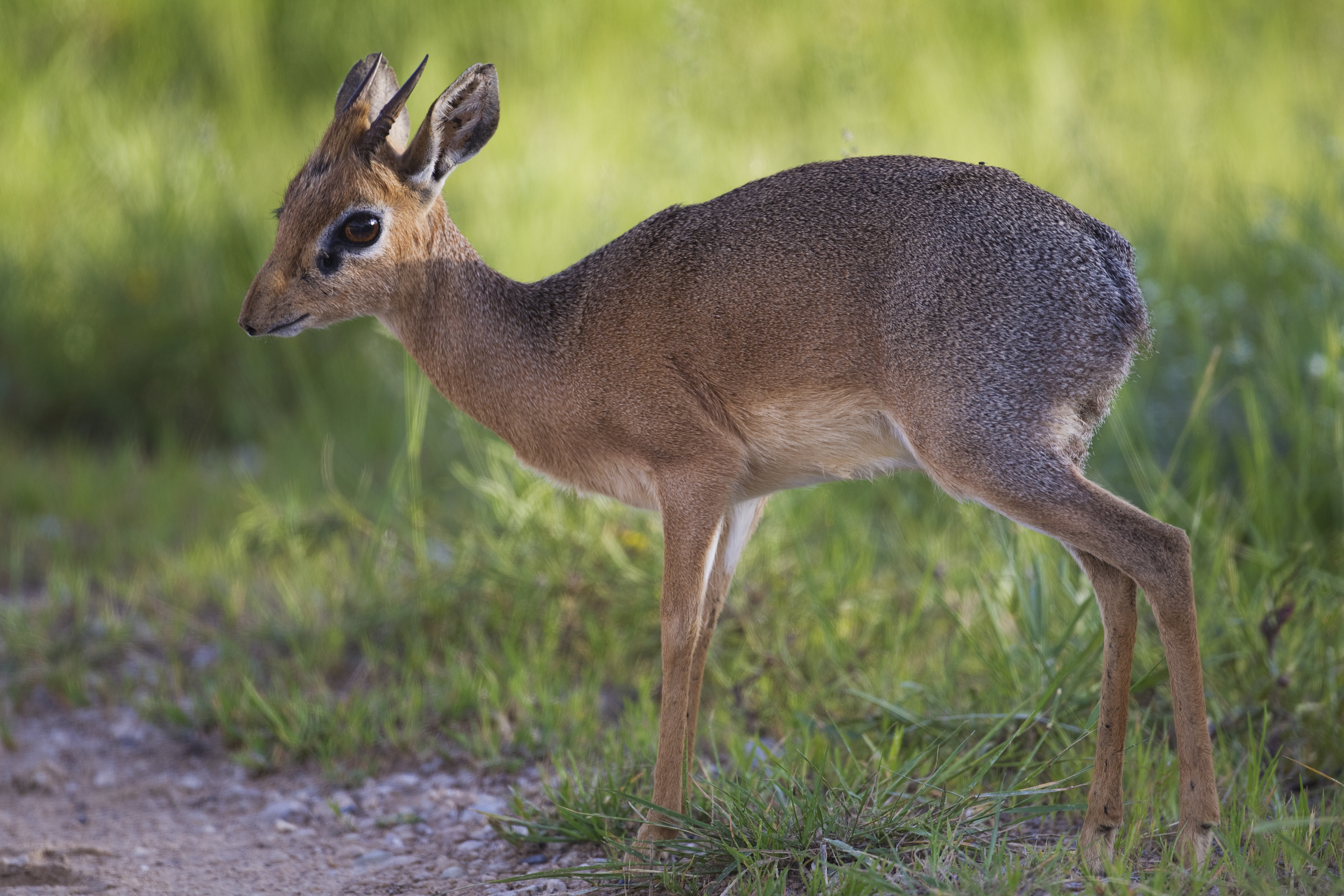
- Male
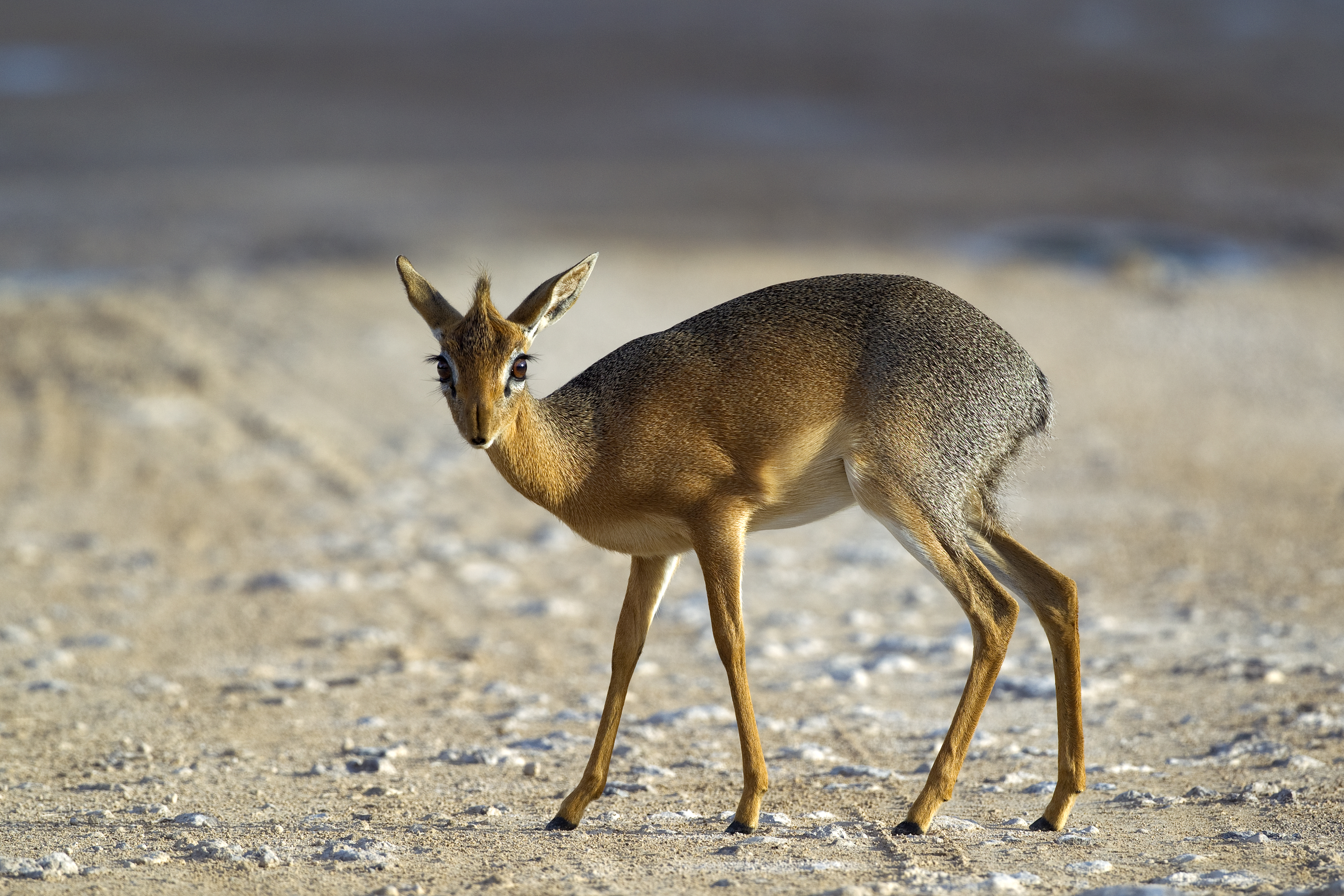
- Female; Both at the Etosha National Park in Namibia

Conservation status
- Least Concern (IUCN 3.1)

Scientific classification
- Kingdom: Animalia
- Phylum: Chordata
- Class: Mammalia
- Order: Artiodactyla
- Family: Bovidae
- Subfamily: Antilopinae
- Genus: Madoqua
- Species: M. kirkii

Binomial name
- Madoqua kirkii (Günther, 1880)

Subspecies
- 4 ssp., see text
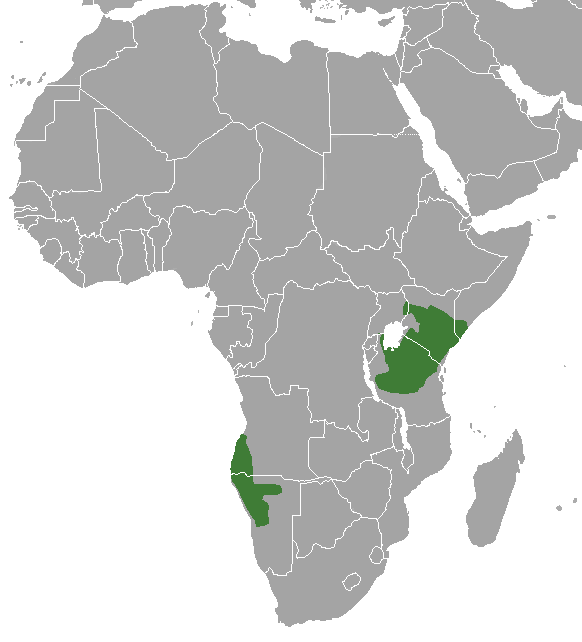
- Range

= Kirk's dik-dik =

Species of mammal

Kirk's dik-dik (Madoqua kirkii) is a species of small dik-dik antelope native to Eastern and Southern Africa. It is believed to have six subspecies and possibly a seventh existing in southwest Africa. Dik-diks are herbivores, typically of a fawn color that aids in camouflaging themselves in savannah habitats. It is also capable of reaching speeds up to 42 km/h (26 mph). The lifespan of Kirk's dik-dik in the wild is typically 5 years, but may surpass 10 years. In captivity, males have been known to live up to 16.5 years, while females have lived up to 18.4 years.

== Etymology ==
The dik-dik's name is derived from its call. When they feel threatened, dik-diks lie low to prevent detection. If they are discovered, they run in a swift, zigzag-like pattern until they reach refuge in a nearby thicket. During this 'flight', they emit trumpet-like "zik-zik" calls to raise an alarm or to harass predators and publicize the presence of a mated pair. The species is named after a Scottish naturalist John Kirk, who collected the type specimen.

== Physical characteristics ==
Dik-diks are some of the world's smallest antelopes, with the largest, the Kirk's dik-dik, standing between 35–45 cm (14–18 in) tall and weighing 3.8–7.2 kg (8.4–15.9 lb). Female dik-diks tend to be 0.4–1 kg (0.88–2.20 lb) heavier than males. They are dainty creatures with a pointed, mobile snout, large eyes and ears, prominent preorbital glands, pipestem legs, hare-like hind limbs that are significantly larger than their forelimbs, and a vestigial tail. Their coats, depending upon their habitat, range from grey to gray-brown with tan flanks, limbs, and an erectile head crest and whitish eye rings, ear lining, underparts, and rump.

Only male dik-diks sport horns, which are about 7.5 cm (3.0 in) long, corrugated, and backward-slanted. Horns of male Kirk's dik-diks may be straight or curved backwards from the profile of the face, and the basal half of the horns have seven to nine annular ridges that are frequently covered by the crest. Kirk's dik-diks are sexually dimorphic; females are larger and lack horns, while males sport a more developed muzzle, have a longer crest, and tend to be lighter in color. Though physically very similar, Kirk's dik-dik can be distinguished from Günthers' dik-dik by its longer nasals and premaxillae and shorter proboscis, which gives the head a more wedged-shaped profile than that of Günther's dik-dik.

== Adaptations ==
Kirk's dik-diks are highly adapted to surviving in the arid regions of eastern Africa. They have a hairy proboscis with tiny, slit-like nostrils, although this is less pronounced than in Günther's dik-diks. This proboscis contains an enlarged nasal chamber supplied with a rich amount of blood that is cooled by rapid nasal panting. Panting through their snouts leads to airflow and evaporation that cools the blood before it is pumped back into the body. This process is also efficient, because it results in a minimal loss of water in the exhaled air. Water- and energy-conserving methods, such as fluctuating body temperatures, lowered metabolic rates, concentrated urine, and dry feces, all contribute to the ability of the dik-dik to survive harsh arid climates. Further, they also conserve fluids by licking dew from their nose and reabsorbing water from their feces. When compared to cattle, dik-diks have a significantly lower density of sweat glands.

Behaviorally, dik-diks are highly nocturnal, and during the daytime seek shade to rest throughout the hottest parts of the day to help avoid the loss of valuable fluids. Dik-diks are also highly selective when browsing on succulents, herbs, and foliage as to maximize fluid acquisition. The hind legs of Kirk's dik-diks are longer and are structurally more uniform than the fore legs. Hopwood 1936 suggests this helps the hind legs propel the dik-dik forward, as the relatively short fore legs of dik-diks are more efficient at ascending broken terrain.

== Habitat and territoriality ==
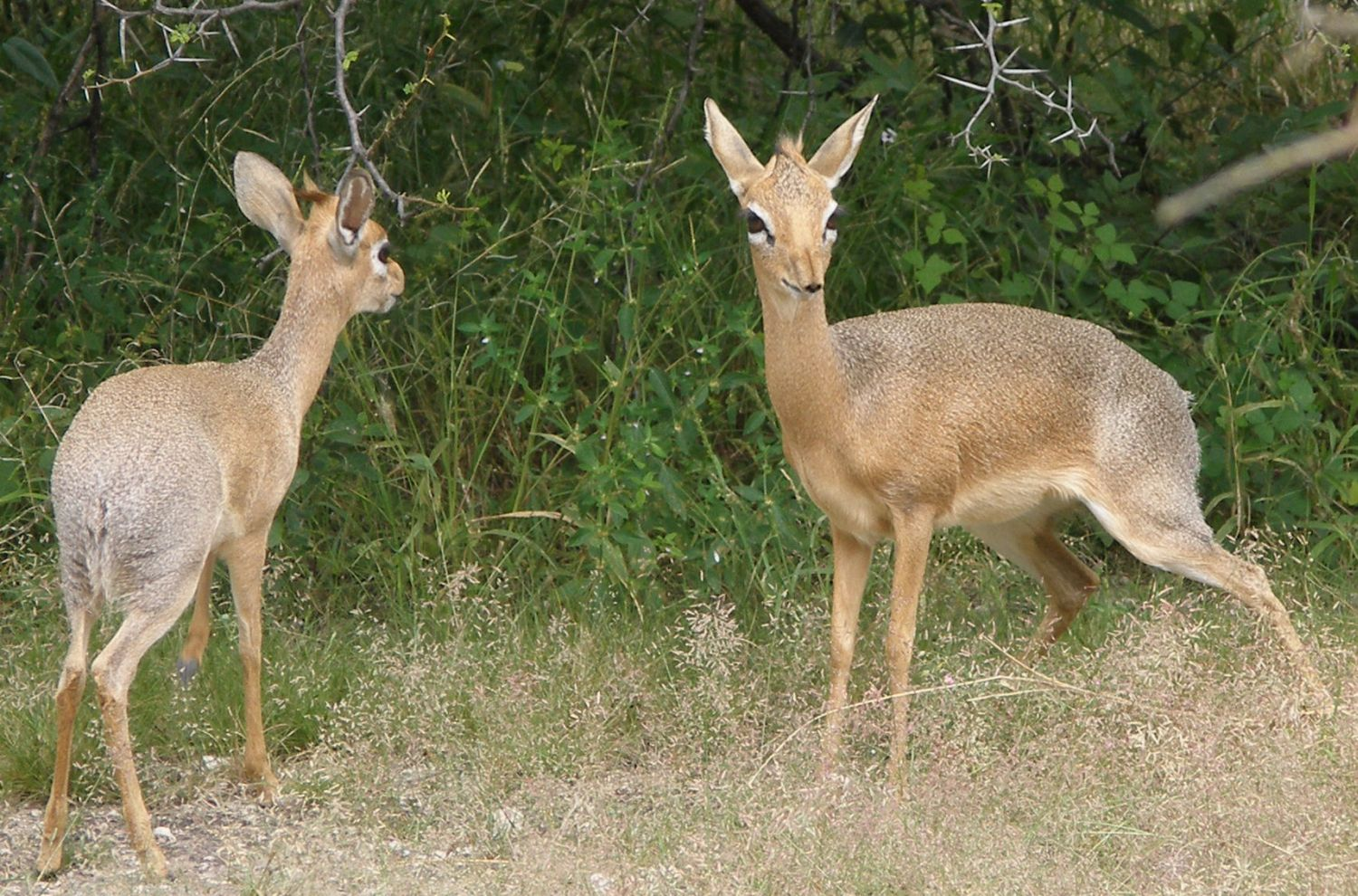
Females, Etosha National Park, Namibia

Kirk's dik-diks are endemic to savannah areas of eastern and southwestern Africa, occurring primarily in the Somali and Southwest arid biotic zones, but encroaching into the Southern savannah biotic zone. Their distribution can be described as discontinuous and as a result they often occur in dispersed patches due to their unique habitat requirements. In Namibia, Kirk's dik-diks occur in isolated areas along the Fish River and do not reside in the Namib desert, though they may traverse desert thickets along sources of water. They prefer habitats with good cover but lacking tall vegetation. Ideal habitats contain a variety of browse, extensive shade, and an open understory at their eye level. (Tinley, 1969) As a result, they move to different ranges when grass grows too high and obstructs their view.

Typical habitats of Kirk's dik-dik consist of thicket mosaics characterized by well-developed shrub layers and scant short grass cover. Dik-diks live in pairs on territories of 2–86 acres, depending on cover and resources. If no unfavorable events occur a pair of Kirk's dik-dik may reside within the same territory for life. Males are the main defenders of territories, as females are unable to maintain territories themselves. (Kingdon 1982) According to MacDonald (1985), territorial conflicts over quality habitat are not frequent, however, when do they occur, males charge one another, stopping just short of physical contact, before repeating the process by running from a longer distance. Furthermore, the encounter ends when one male surrenders, which results in both males scratching at the ground, urinating, and defecating".

== Diet ==
Dik-diks are herbivorous and their diets consist mainly of foliage, fruits, shoots, and berries. Due to their adaptations, dik-diks are water-independent and rely on vegetation as a source of water. Kirk's dik-diks are concentrate selectors, feeding selectively on dicotyledonous plants that can be rapidly fermented and digested. This includes leaves and fruit high in nutrients and water, but low in fiber and cellulose. Grasses are only consumed when they are germinating and Kirk's dik-diks have stomach capacities and mass that consist of 8.5–10.0% of body mass when full and 2.2% when empty". Because of the aforementioned facts and their high food requirements, Kirk's dik-diks feed and ruminate periodically throughout day and night. They consume roughly 3.8% of their body mass daily.

== Reproduction and behavior ==
Similar to other dwarf antelopes, Kirk's dik-diks exist in monogamous pairs on territories. Territories are marked with dung and urine that are deposited in a ritual that is performed to help maintain pair bonds. During the ritual, the female will excrete, followed by the male, which samples the female's urine stream to check her reproductive capacity. He paws over and then marks his dung and urine over her deposit. Finally, the pair marks nearby twigs with secretions from their preorbital glands. The male courts the female by running up behind her with his head and neck stretched and his muzzle pointing out in front. Copulation begins with the male standing on his hind legs behind the female and waving his forelegs at an acute angle to his own body in the air over her back". Copulation typically occurs three to five times within a 9-hour period.

Kirk's dik-diks have a gestation period of 5–6 months, and may produce up to two offspring per year. Females reach sexual maturity between 6 and 8 months of age, while this occurs for males between 8 and 9 months. Dik-diks produce one offspring per gestation. Most births occur between November and December and April through May, which coincides with the timing of the rainy seasons. Dik-diks differ from other ruminants in that offspring are born with their fore legs along the body, rather than extended forward. After birth, the offspring lie concealed away from their mother 2–3 weeks, and survival rates for fawns are roughly 50%. Once offspring reach a certain age, they also begin to participate in the bonding ritual, and remain with the parents until another offspring is born. At this point, the parents chase the older sibling out of their territory. The older offspring then seeks out its own territory and mate.

== Genetics ==
Dik-diks in general have complex chromosomal arrangements. They typically have 2n=46 to 2n=48 arrangements; however, dik-diks with 2n=49 have been discovered, as well. Furthermore, some have 47 chromosomes with X/A translocation. The two common cytotypes (46- and 48-chromosome individuals) are different enough so that resulting hybrids are sterile. Many zoos are now known to harbor hybrids between different cytotypes, with anomalous chromosome numbers and causing previously unexplained sterility. Examination of these individuals shows a lack of spermatogenesis in males, for example hybrids between Kirk's and Günther's dik-diks are infertile.

== Predators ==
The main predators of Kirk's dik-dik are jackals, caracals, leopards, hyenas, cheetahs, Cape wild dogs, honey badgers, crocodiles, pythons, and lions. The young of Kirk's dik-dik are particularly preyed upon by baboons, genets, and eagles. Dik-diks have fine-tuned senses of hearing, sight, and smell. When they feel in danger or hear the alarm calls of other animals, they hide, rather than flee. Only when frightened or disturbed do they emit their iconic "zik-zik" alarm.

== Human impacts and interactions ==
Humans are the greatest threat to dik-diks, which are sometimes hunted for their hides and bones, often using snares. The bones from their legs and feet are used in traditional jewelry, while their hides are fashioned into suede gloves. An entire dik-dik hide is required to produce a single glove. Nowak (1991) asserted that dik-diks are disliked by local hunters because they flush and warn larger game to the presence of humans. Dik-diks also benefit from the destruction of vegetation via human-mediated slash-and-burn agriculture that results in the subsequent secondary growth of shrubs that serve as a food source and place of refuge for dik-diks. The IUCN Redlist lists Kirk's dik-dik as "least concern".

== Subspecies ==
Usually, four subspecies of Kirk's dik-diks are distinguished, but they may represent three or more distinct species:

- M. k. kirkii Günther, 1880
- M. k. cavendishi Thomas, 1898 – Cavendish's dik-dik
- M. k. damarensis Günther, 1880 – Damara dik-dik
- M. k. hindei Thomas, 1898
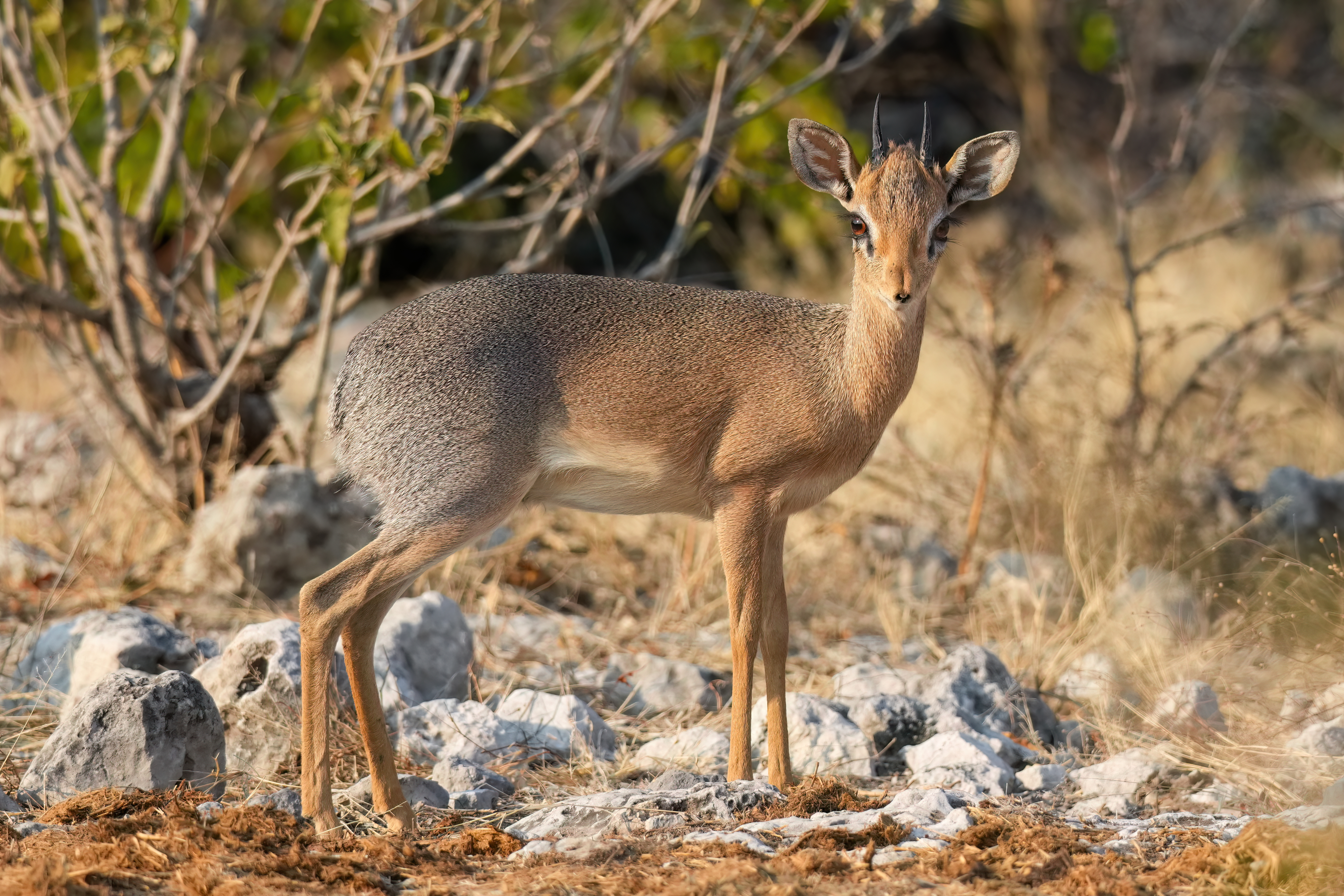
Male Damara dik-dik, Etosha National Park, Namibia

== Gallery ==
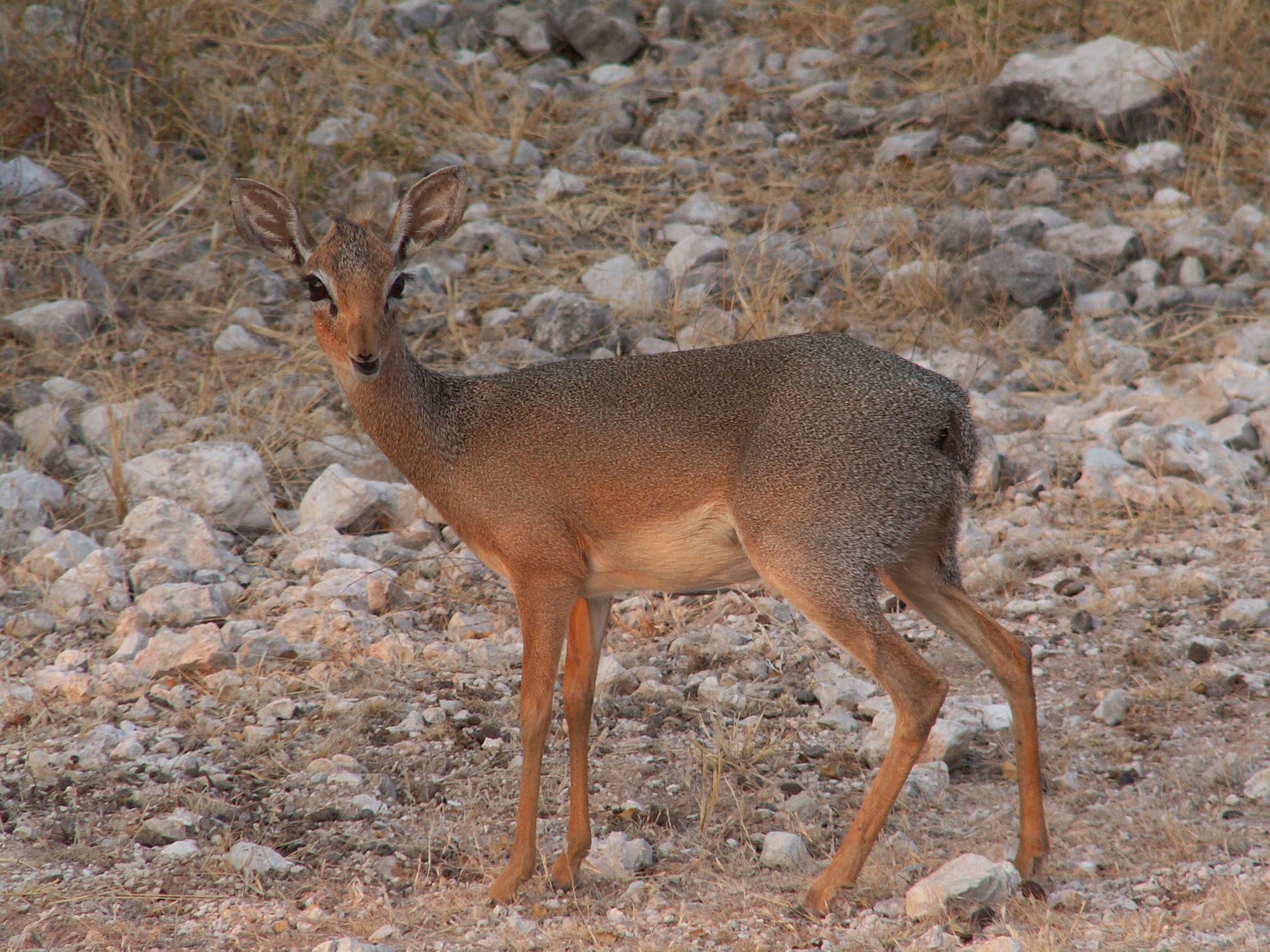
M. k. damarensis
female, Etosha National Park, Namibia

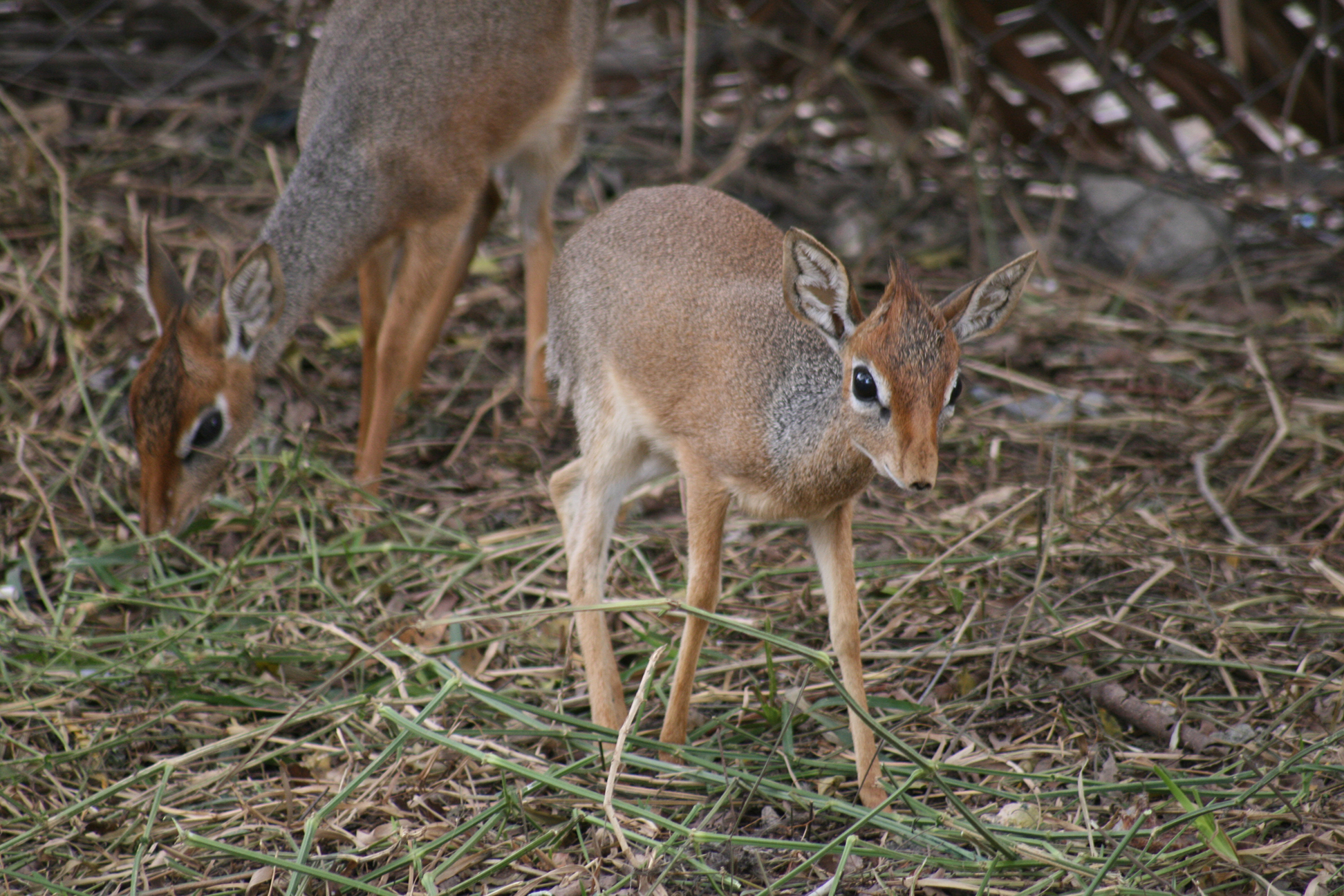
Juvenile

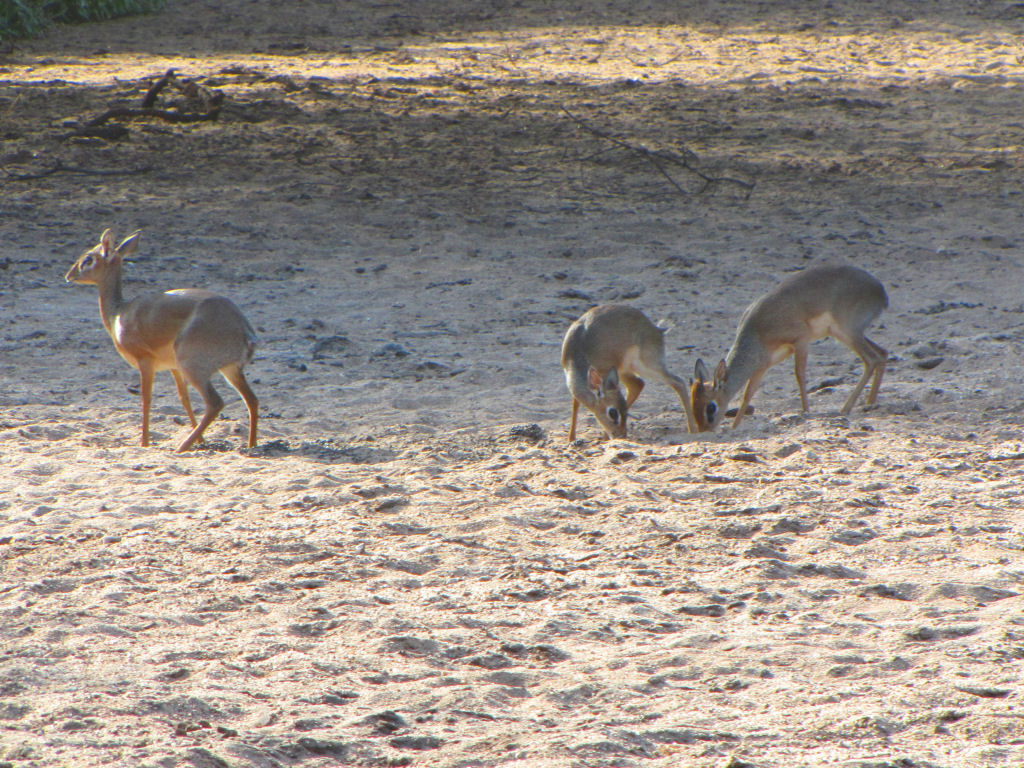
Family, Lake Manyara, Tanzania

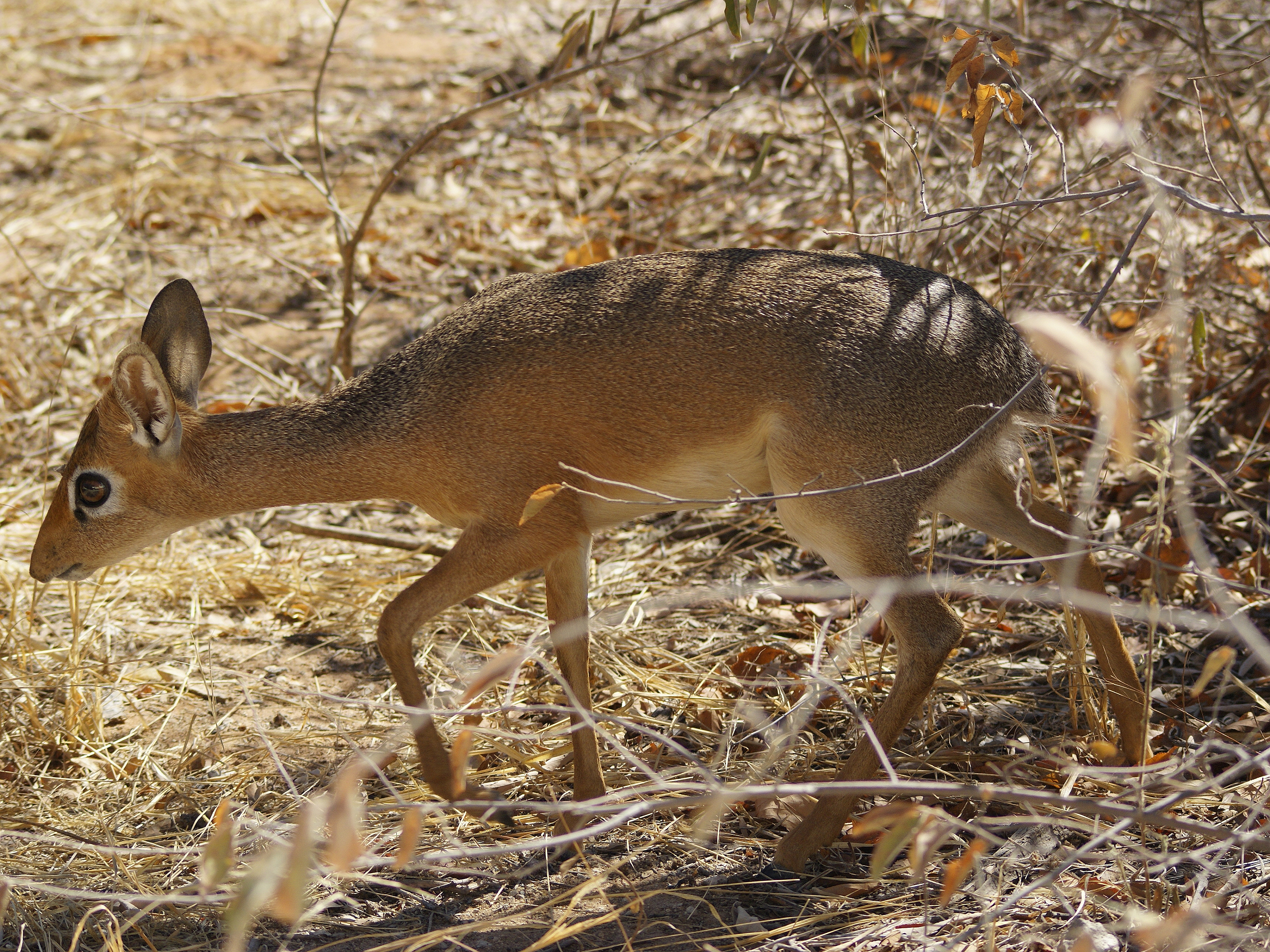
Male, Etosha, Namibia
