= Haiǁom–ǂAakhoe dialect =

Khoekhoe dialect

Haiǁom–ǂAakhoe
- ǂĀkhoe
- Native to: Namibia, South Africa, Angola and Botswana
- Region: Etosha pan, Kavango, Mangetti Dune, Omataku, Grootfontein, Baghani, Tsintsabis and Maroelaboom
- Ethnicity: Haiǁom people
- Native speakers: 52,000 (2003–2016)
- Language family: Khoe–Kwadi: Khoe; Khoekhoe; Khoekhoegowab; Haiǁom–ǂAakhoe
- Dialects: ǂAakhoe; Haiǁom; Kede

Language codes
- ISO 639-3: hgm (Haiǁom)
- Glottolog: haio1238

ǂAakhoe (ǂĀkhoe) and Haiǁom are dialects of the Khoekhoe dialect continuum spoken mainly in Namibia by the Haiǁom people. In the sparsely available material on the subject, ǂAkhoe and Haiǁom have been considered a variant of the Khoekhoe language, as separate dialects, as virtual synonyms of a single variant, or as "a way in which some Haiǁom speak their language in the northern part of Namibia". ǂAkhoe especially is intermediate between the Khoekhoe and Kalahari branches of the Khoe language family. According to Ethnologue there were 52,000 Haiǁom speakers in 2016.

== The people ==
The Haiǁom are traditionally hunter-gatherers, and many aspects of this traditional culture have been preserved in spite of the political, economic, and linguistic marginalisation of the group. Characteristical features of their culture include healing trance dances, hunting magic, intensive usage of wild plant and insect food, a unique kinship and naming system, frequent storytelling, and the use of a landscape-term system for spatial orientation.

The Haiǁom live in the savannah of northern Namibia, in an area stretching from the edges of Etosha salt pan and the northern white farming areas as far as the Angola border – and perhaps beyond – in the north and Kavango in the east.

== Phonology ==
Comparing Heikinnen's and Widlock's contribution to ǂAkhoe phonology with the more general and theoretical phonological work of Peter Ladefoged (1996), ǂAkhoe can be said to have 47 phonemes. However, an in-depth phonological sketch of the language might show other results where the vowels are concerned.

=== Consonants ===
There are 34 consonants in ǂAkhoe, 20 of which are clicks produced with an ingressive airstream, and 14 of which are pulmonic consonants produced with an egressive airstream.

Clicks
	Dental	Alveolar	Palatal	Lateral
VL unaspirated	ᵏǀ ⟨ǀg⟩	ᵏǃ ⟨ǃg⟩	ᵏǂ ⟨ǂg⟩	ᵏǁ ⟨ǁg⟩
VL aspirated	ᵏǀʰ ⟨ǀh⟩	ᵏǃʰ ⟨!h⟩	ᵏǂʰ ⟨ǂh⟩	ᵏǁʰ ⟨ǁh⟩
VL nasalised	ᵑǀᵏ ⟨ǀn⟩	ᵑǃᵏ ⟨ǃn⟩	ᵑǂᵏ ⟨ǂn⟩	ᵑǁᵏ ⟨ǁn⟩
Glottal closure	ᵏǀʔ ⟨ǀ'⟩	ᵏǃʔ ⟨ǃ'⟩	ᵏǂʔ ⟨ǂ'⟩	ᵏǁʔ ⟨ǁ'⟩
Aspirated/glottal	ᵏǀʔʰ ⟨ǀ'h⟩	ᵏ!ʔʰ ⟨ǃ'h⟩	ᵏǂʔʰ ⟨ǂ'h⟩	ᵏǁʔʰ ⟨ǁ'h⟩

Pulmonic consonants
		Bilabial	Dental	Alveolar	Velar	Glottal
Nasal		m ⟨m⟩	n ⟨n⟩			
Stop	plain	p ⟨b⟩	t ⟨t⟩		k ⟨k⟩	
Stop	prenasalized	ᵐb ⟨mb⟩	ⁿd ⟨nd⟩			
Affricate	plain			ts ⟨tsh⟩	kx ⟨kh⟩	
Affricate	prenasalized			ⁿdz ⟨ndz⟩		
Fricative				s ⟨s⟩	x ⟨x⟩	ɦ ⟨h⟩
Flap				ɾ ⟨r⟩		

=== Vowels ===
ǂAkhoe Haiǁom has a total of 12 vowel phonemes. These can be divided into monophthongs and diphthongs, with a further subdivision into oral and nasal pronunciation.

Monophthongs
/i e a o u/ and /ĩ ã ũ/.

Diphthongs
/ai au/ and /ãi ãu/.

== Grammar ==
In theory ǂAkhoe possesses free word order, with the subject–object–verb order (SOV) being the dominant preference. In keeping with the typological profile of SOV languages, adjectives, demonstratives and numerals generally precede nouns. Nouns are marked by person–gender–number (PGN) markers. Adjectives, demonstratives and numerals all agree with their head noun.

Mãa ǀũ-ba nde-ba?
what colour-3SGM this-3SGM
"What colour is this?"

Mãa is an interrogative used freely in Haiǁom, the subject |ũ takes the suffix -ba, which is a PGN marker denoting the 3rd person masculine singular. The indirect object nde, a demonstrative, follows the noun, and is inflected in concord with the head noun.

Compound structures are highly productive in ǂAkhoe and vary widely in the combination of word categories. The possibilities include: noun+noun, noun+adverb or vice versa, noun+adjective or vice versa, adjective+adjective, adjective+adverb or vice versa, adjective+suffix, or multiple combinations of the above.

== See also ==
- Original People's Party of Namibia, a political party in colonial Namibia led by Theophilus Soroseb, a member of the Haiǁom and Ovambo groups

== Bibliography ==
- Haacke, W. (1988) Nama|Damara I, Guide 2: Morphology and syntax, mimeographed.
- Haacke, W.; Eiseb, E.; Namaseb, L. (1997). "Internal and External Relations of Khoekhoe Dialects, a Preliminary Survey". In Haacke, Wilfrid H. G.; Elderkin, Edward E. (eds.). Namibian languages: reports and papers. Namibian African studies. Köln: R. Köppe. ISBN 978-3-89645-080-7.
- ,Heikinnen, T. (n.d.). "A Description of the language of ≠Akhoen" (Document). unpublished manuscript.
- Ladefoged, Peter & Maddieson, Ian (1996) The sounds of the world's languages, Oxford: Blackwell.
- Widlok, T. (n.d.). "A Haiǁom sourcebook: The T. Heikinnen Papers" (Document). unpublished manuscript.
- Widlok, Thomas. 2013. Hai//om. In Rainer Vossen (ed.), The Khoesan languages, 56-58, 157-165, 347-355. London & New York: Routledge.
