= Original People's Party of Namibia =

The Original People's Party of Namibia (OPPN) was a political party in Namibia, founded by Theophilus Soroseb in 1980, after a decade of political activity in the South West African People's Democratic United Front (SWAPDUF).

The OPPN aimed at social, economic, moral and formal equity of "Bushmen" and the slogan of the party was "We are like birds whose nest is devastated by unheeding boys".

In 1981, the OPPN left Democratic Turnhalle Alliance (DTA).

In 1989, the OPPN joined the United Democratic Front of Namibia.
