= Etosha National Park =

National park of Namibia

- IUCN category II (national park)
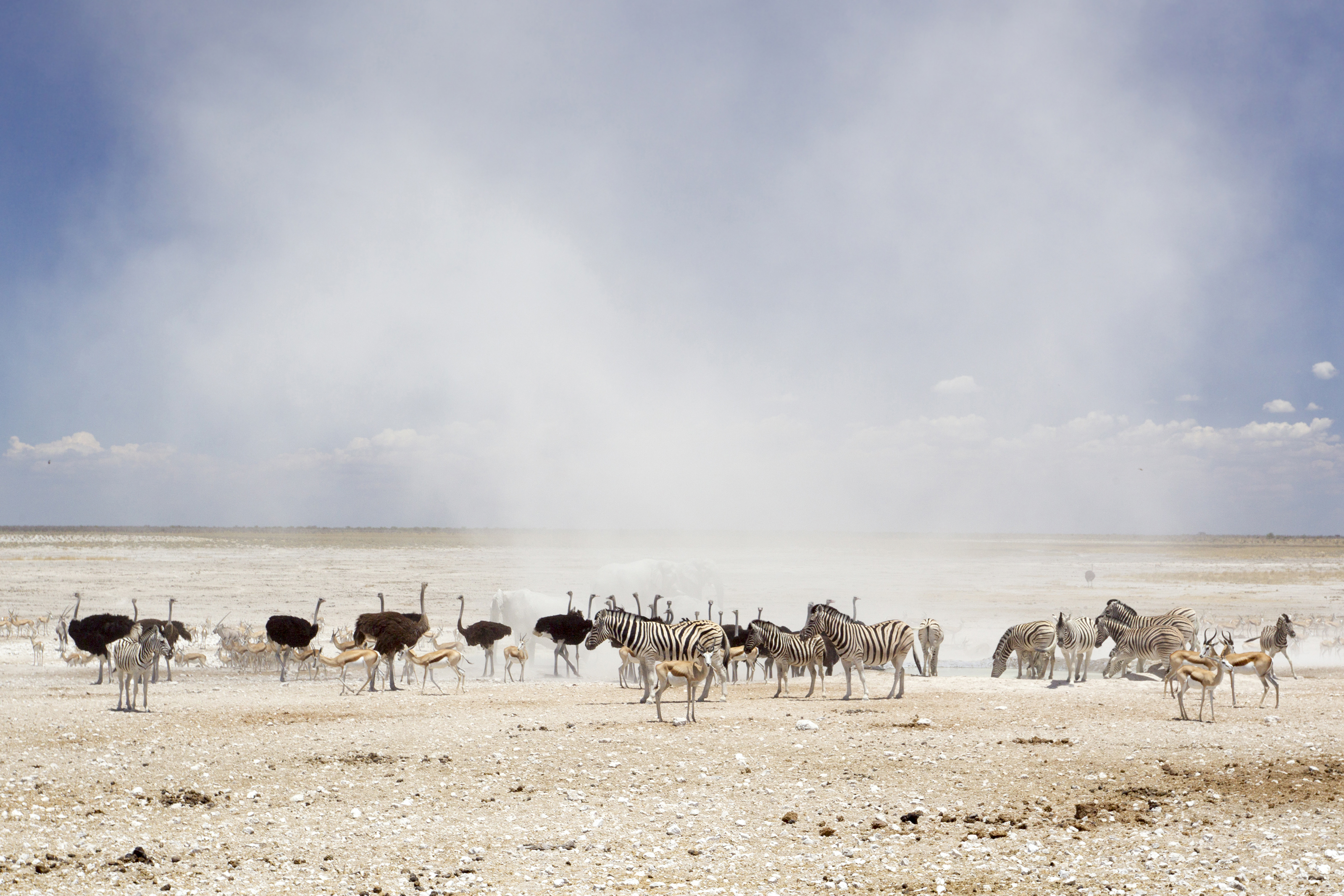
- Animals at the Nebrownii waterhole

- Location within Namibia
- Location: Namibia
- Coordinates: 18°56′43″S 15°53′52″E
- Area: 22,270 km^{2} (8,600 sq mi)
- Established: March 22, 1907
- Visitors: 200000 (in 2010)
- Governing body: Ministry of Environment and Tourism, Namibia

Etosha National Park is a national park in northwestern Namibia and one of the largest national parks in Africa. It was proclaimed a game reserve in March 1907 in Ordinance 88 by the Governor of German South West Africa, Friedrich von Lindequist. It was designated as Wildschutzgebiet in 1958, and was awarded the status of national park in 1967, by an act of parliament of the Republic of South Africa. It spans an area of 22,270 km^{2} (8,600 sq mi) and was named after the large Etosha pan which is almost entirely within the park. With an area of 4,760 km^{2} (1,840 sq mi), the Etosha pan covers 23% of the total area of the national park. The area is home to hundreds of species of mammals, birds and reptiles, including several threatened and endangered species such as the black rhinoceros. Sixty-one black rhinoceros were killed during poaching in Namibia during 2022, 46 of which were killed in Etosha.

The park is located in the Kunene region and shares boundaries with the regions of Oshana, Oshikoto and Otjozondjupa.

== History ==
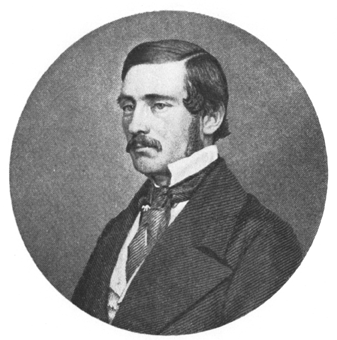
Charles John (Karl Johan) Andersson

Areas north of the Etosha pan were inhabited by Ovambo people, while various Otjiherero-speaking groups lived immediately outside the current park boundaries. The areas inside the park close to the Etosha pan were inhabited by Khoisan-speaking Hai//om people.

Explorers Charles John Andersson and Francis Galton are the first Europeans to record the existence of the Etosha pan on 29 May 1851, although it was already widely known by locals. These European explorers were traveling with Ovambo copper ore traders when they arrived at Omutjamatunda (now known as Namutoni). They passed through, and discovered the Etosha pan when they traveled north upon leaving Namutoni. The name Etosha (spelled Etotha in early literature) comes from the Oshindonga word meaning "Great White Place" referring to the Etosha pan. The Hai//om called the pan Khubus which means "totally bare, white place with lots of dust". The pan is also known as Chums, which refers to the noise made by a person's feet when walking on the clay of the pan.

At this time the Hai//om people recognized the authority of the Ovambo chief at Ondonga but the Hereros did not. The Hai||om were forcibly removed from the park in 1954, ending their hunter-gatherer lifestyle to become landless farm laborers. The Hai||om have had a recognized Traditional Authority since 2004 which helps facilitate communications between the community and the government. The government of Namibia acknowledges the park to be the home of Hai||om people and started to carry out plans to resettle displaced families on farms adjacent to the national park. Since 2007 the Government has acquired six farms directly south of the Gobaub depression in Etosha National Park. A number of families have settled on these farms under the leadership of Chief David Khamuxab, Paramount Chief of the Hai||om.

A wildfire burned through approximately one-third of the park in September 2025, requiring the Namibian government to deploy 500 troops. The fire is believed to have been started by charcoal production from bordering commercial farms and exacerbated by high winds and dry conditions.

=== European settlers ===
In 1885, entrepreneur William Worthington Jordan bought a huge tract of land from Ovambo chief Kambonde. The land spanned nearly 170 kilometres (110 mi) from Okaukuejo in the west to Fischer's Pan in the east. The price for the land was £300 sterling, paid for by 25 firearms, one salted horse and a cask of brandy. Dorstland Trekkers first travelled through the park between 1876 and 1879 on their way to Angola. The trekkers returned in 1885 and settled on 25-square-kilometre (9.7 mi^{2}) farms given to them at no charge by Jordan. The trekkers named the area Upingtonia after the Prime Minister of the Cape Colony. The settlement had to be abandoned in 1886 after clashes with the Hai||om and defeat by Chief Nehale Mpingana.

=== German South-West Africa ===
The German Reich ordered troops to occupy Okaukuejo, Namutoni and Sesfontein in 1886 in order to kill migrating wildlife to stop the spread of rinderpest to cattle. A fort was built by the German cavalry in 1889 at the site of the Namutoni spring. On 28 January 1904, 500 men under Nehale Mpingana attacked Imperial Germany's Schutztruppe at Fort Namutoni and completely destroyed it, driving out the colonial forces and taking over their horses and cattle. The fort was rebuilt and troops were stationed once again when the area was declared a game reserve in 1907; Lieutenant Adolf Fischer of Fort Namutoni then became its first "game warden".

=== Boundary ===
Changing park boundaries 1907-1970

The present-day Etosha National Park has had many major and minor boundary changes since its inception in 1907. The major boundary changes since 1907 were because of Ordinance 18 of 1958 and Ordinance 21 of 1970.

When the Etosha area was proclaimed as "Game Reserve 2" by Ordinance 88 of 1907, the park stretched from the mouths of the Kunene River and Hoarusib River on the Skeleton Coast to Namutoni in the east. The original area was estimated to be 99,526 square kilometres (38,427 sq mi), an estimate that has been corrected to about 80,000 square kilometres (31,000 sq mi). Ordinance 18 of 1958 changed the western park boundaries to exclude the area between the Kunene river and the Hoarusib river and instead include the area between Hoanib river and Ugab river, thus reducing the park's area to 55,000 square kilometres (21,000 sq mi). The Odendaal Commission's (1963) decision resulted in the demarcation of the present-day park boundary in 1970.

=== Etosha Ecological Institute ===
The Etosha Ecological Institute was formally opened on 1 April 1974 by Adolf Brinkmann of the South-West African Administration. The institute is responsible for all management-related research in the park. Classification of vegetation, population and ecological studies on wildebeest, elephants and lions, and studies on anthrax were among the first major topics to be investigated. The EEI has collaborations with researchers from universities in Namibia, the United States, the United Kingdom, Germany, South Africa, Australia, Norway and Israel.

== Geography ==
=== Etosha Pan ===
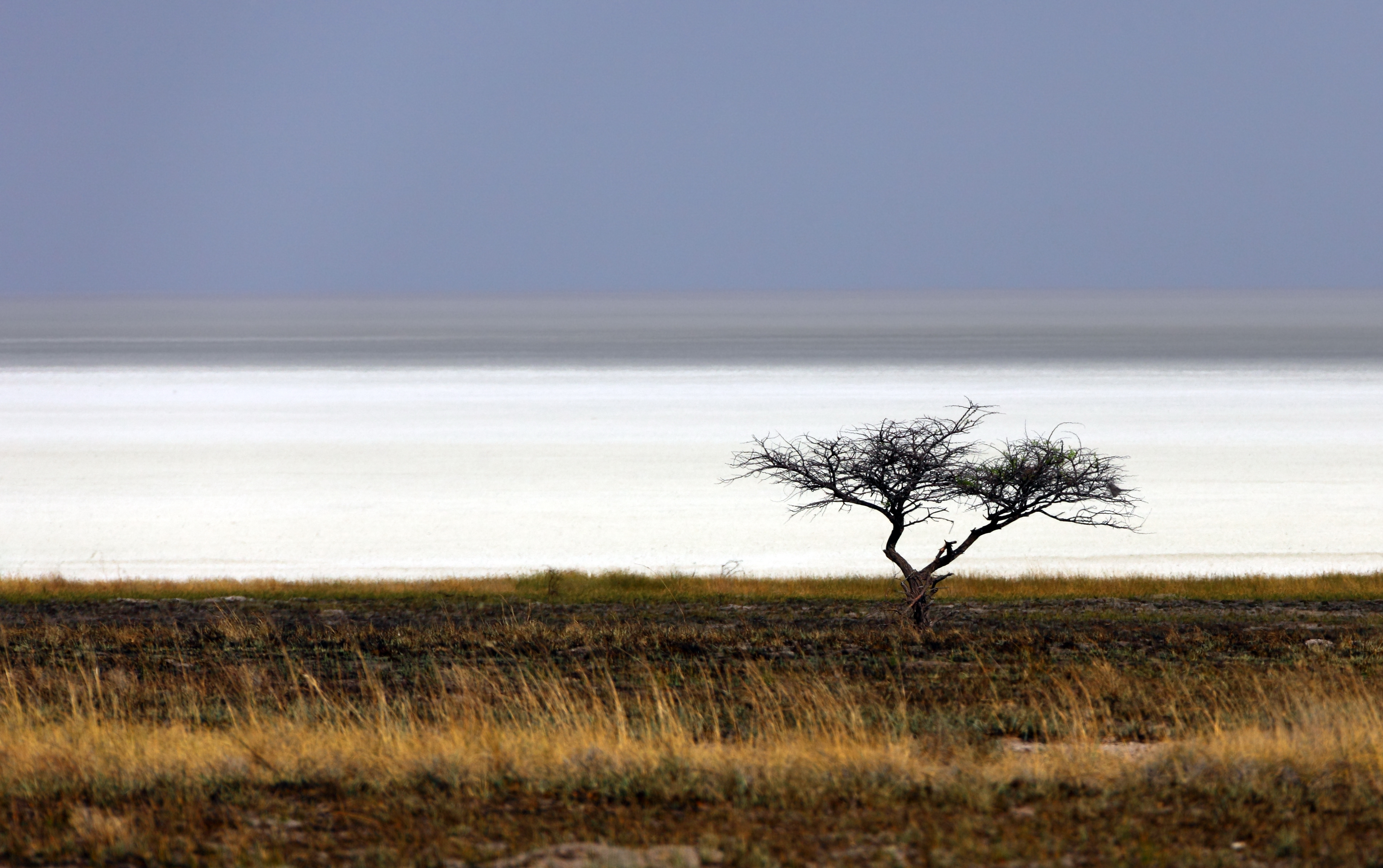
Etosha Pan lookout near Salvadora

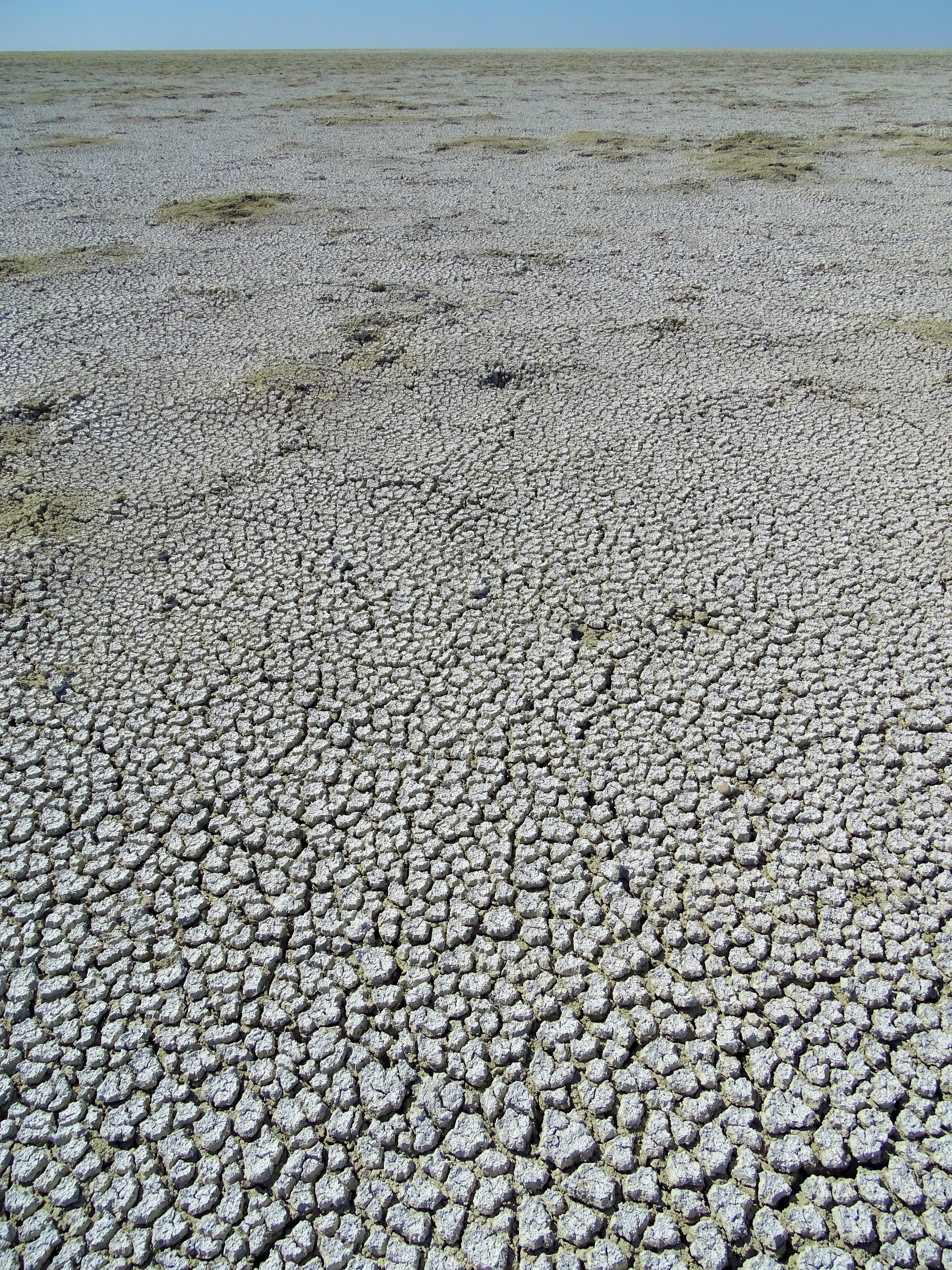
The salt pan during drought, broken up and with animal tracks

The salt pans are the most noticeable geological features in the national park. The main depression covers an area of about 5,000 square kilometres (1,900 sq mi), and is roughly 130 km (81 mi) long and as wide as 50 km (31 mi) in some places. The hypersaline conditions of the pan limit the species that can permanently inhabit the pan itself; occurrences of extremophile micro-organisms are present, which can tolerate the hypersaline conditions. The salt pan is usually dry, but fills with water briefly in summer, when it attracts pelicans and flamingos in particular. In the dry season, winds blowing across the salt pan pick up saline dust and carry it across the country and out over the southern Atlantic. This salt enrichment provides minerals to the soil downwind of the pan on which some wildlife depends, though the salinity also creates challenges to farming activities. The Etosha Pan was one of several sites throughout southern Africa in the Southern African Regional Science Initiative (SAFARI 2000). Using satellites, aircraft, and ground-based data from sites such as Etosha, partners in this program collected a wide variety of data on aerosols, land cover, and other characteristics of the land and atmosphere to study and understand the interactions between people and the natural environment.

=== Dolomite Hills ===
The dolomite hills on the southern border of the park near the Andersson entrance gate are called Ondundozonananandana, meaning the place where young boy herding cattle went to never return, probably implying a high density of predators like leopards in the hills, giving the mountains its English name of Leopard Hills. The Halali area is also home to dolomite hills within the park, with one hill inside the camp and the nearby Twee Koppies outside. Western Etosha is also dominated by dolomite hills and is the only place in the park that has mountain zebra.

=== Climate ===
The Etosha National Park has a savanna desert climate. The annual mean average temperature is 24 °C (75 °F). In winter, the mean nighttime lows are around 10 °C (50 °F), while in summer temperatures often hover around 40 °C (104 °F). As it is a desert, there is a large variation between day and night. Rain almost never falls in the winter.

Climate data for Etosha Safari Lodge, Namibia (2010–2017 averages)
Month	Jan	Feb	Mar	Apr	May	Jun	Jul	Aug	Sep	Oct	Nov	Dec	Year
Record high °C (°F)	41.2 (106.2)	40.2 (104.4)	38.3 (100.9)	36.9 (98.4)	34.1 (93.4)	31.9 (89.4)	32.3 (90.1)	36.3 (97.3)	39.2 (102.6)	40.9 (105.6)	40.1 (104.2)	41.2 (106.2)	41.2 (106.2)
Mean daily maximum °C (°F)	34.3 (93.7)	33.5 (92.3)	31.7 (89.1)	31.0 (87.8)	29.5 (85.1)	27.4 (81.3)	27.2 (81.0)	30.9 (87.6)	35.0 (95.0)	37.2 (99.0)	35.5 (95.9)	34.4 (93.9)	32.3 (90.1)
Daily mean °C (°F)	25.5 (77.9)	25.7 (78.3)	24.0 (75.2)	23.2 (73.8)	21.4 (70.5)	18.6 (65.5)	18.0 (64.4)	21.3 (70.3)	25.3 (77.5)	27.5 (81.5)	26.6 (79.9)	26.0 (78.8)	23.6 (74.5)
Mean daily minimum °C (°F)	18.4 (65.1)	19.5 (67.1)	18.0 (64.4)	16.5 (61.7)	13.9 (57.0)	10.3 (50.5)	9.6 (49.3)	12.1 (53.8)	15.8 (60.4)	18.0 (64.4)	18.3 (64.9)	18.8 (65.8)	15.8 (60.4)
Record low °C (°F)	10.2 (50.4)	14.3 (57.7)	10.2 (50.4)	9.8 (49.6)	8.3 (46.9)	−0.2 (31.6)	2.6 (36.7)	1.6 (34.9)	2.8 (37.0)	11.2 (52.2)	10.9 (51.6)	11.6 (52.9)	−0.2 (31.6)
Average precipitation mm (inches)	129.5 (5.10)	74.9 (2.95)	78.2 (3.08)	28.8 (1.13)	0 (0)	0 (0)	0 (0)	0 (0)	0.2 (0.01)	2.1 (0.08)	25.2 (0.99)	79 (3.1)	418 (16.5)

== Vegetation types ==
In most places in the park, the pans are devoid of vegetation with the exception of halophytic Sporobolus salsus, a protein-rich grass that is eaten by grazers like blue wildebeest and springbok. The areas around the Etosha pan also have other halophytic vegetation including grasses like Sporobolus spicatus and Odyssea paucinervis, as well as shrubs like Suaeda articulata. Most of the park is savanna woodlands except for areas close to the pan. Mopane is the most common tree, estimated to make up around 80% of all trees in the park. The sandveld in the north-eastern corner of Etosha is dominated by acacia and Terminalia trees. Tamboti trees characterize the woodlands south of the sandveld. Dwarf shrub savanna occurs in areas close to the pan and is home to several small shrubs including a halophytic succulent Salsola etoshensis. Thorn bush savanna occurs close to the pan on limestone and alkaline soils and is dominated by acacia species such as Acacia nebrownii, Acacia luederitzii, Senegalia mellifera, Acacia hebeclada and Vachellia tortilis. Grasslands in the park are mainly around the Etosha pan where the soil is sandy. Depending on the soil and the effects of the pan, grasslands could be dominated by one of the Eragrostis, Sporobolus, Monelytrum, Odyssea or Enneapogon species.

== Fauna ==
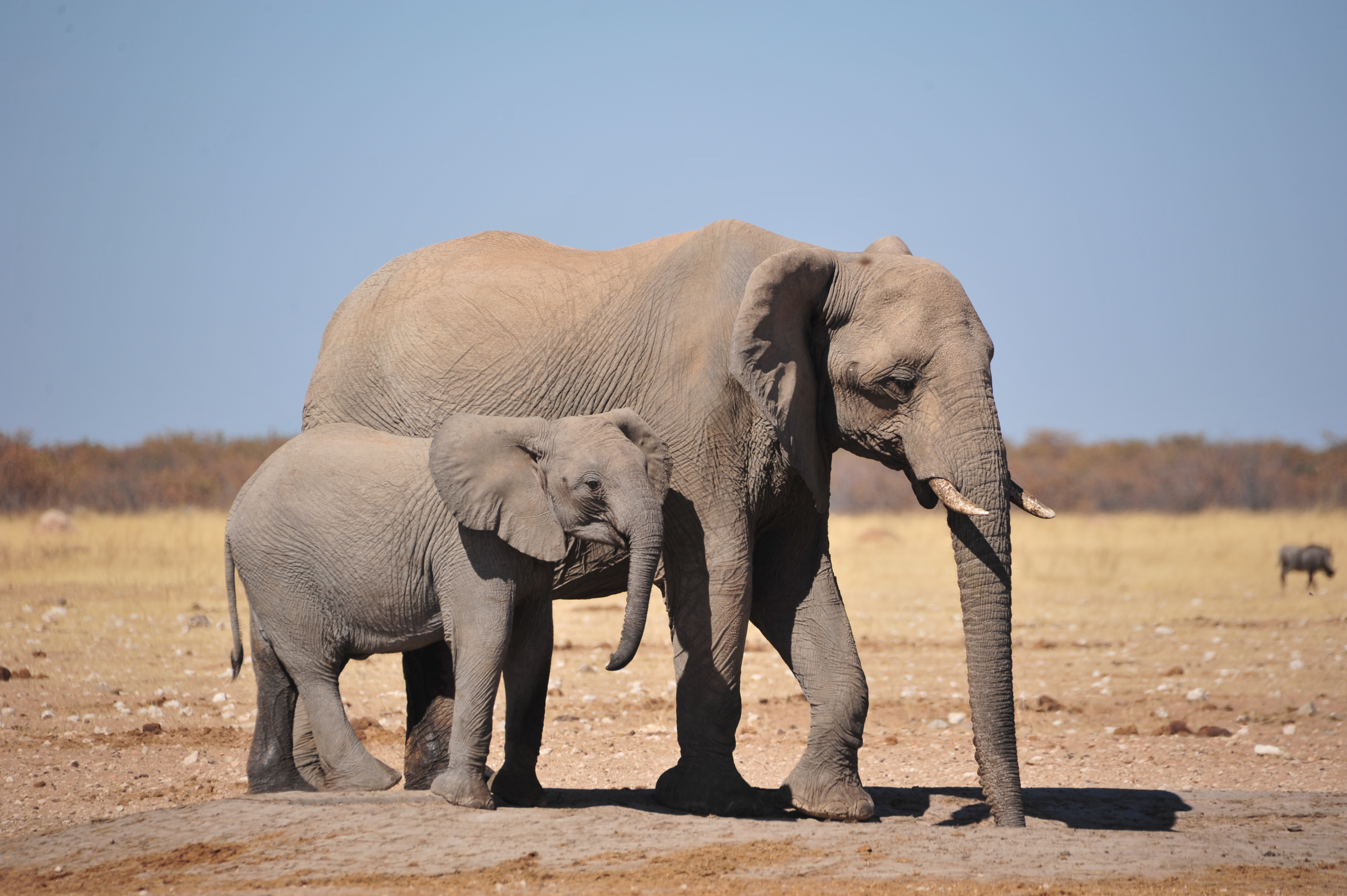
Elephants at the Jakkalswater Waterhole in Etosha Nationalpark.

The park has about 114 mammal species, 340 bird species, 110 reptile species, 16 amphibian species and 1 species of fish (up to 49 species of fish during floods). Etosha National Park is also the single-most important custodian of the black rhino in the world. In 2022, 46 white and black rhinos were poached in the park, which was more than half of the rhinos poached in the country for their horns.

=== History ===
By 1881, large game mammals like elephants, rhinoceroses and lions had been nearly exterminated in the region. The proclamation of the game reserve helped some of the animals recover, but some species like buffalo and wild dogs have been extinct since the middle of the 20th century. A writer from Otjiwarongo was appointed game warden in 1951, and he considered the grasslands to be severely overgrazed. A bone meal plant was constructed near Rietfontein, and culling of zebras and wildebeests began in 1952. Official records indicate 293 zebras and 122 wildebeest were processed at the plant, but conservationists claimed thousands had been culled and successfully forced the plant's closure during the same year. The drought that began in the year 1980 resulted in the largest capture and culling operation in the history of the park. 2235 mountain zebras and 450 plains zebras were captured, culled or sold. 525 elephants were culled and processed at a temporary abattoir near Olifantsrus.

Since 2005, the protected area is considered part of a Lion Conservation Unit.

=== Mammals ===
Commonly seen mammals in the park, past and present, are listed in the table below:

Mammal	Status	Additional information
African bush elephant	common	Etosha's elephants belong to the group of elephants in northwestern Namibia and southern Angola. They are the tallest elephants in Africa, but mineral deficiencies mean that they have very short tusks.
Southern white rhinoceros	very rare	Reintroduced recently after a long absence
South-western black rhinoceros	rare	Odendaal Commission's plan in 1963 severely reduced the habitat of the rhinoceros as most of their preferred habitat fell outside the park. Relocation programs have existed since then to increase the population of rhinos within the protected boundaries of the park.
Cape buffalo	extinct	The last known record of buffalo in the park is from an observation of a young bull killed by lions on the Andoni plains in the 1950s.
Angolan giraffe	common	A 2009 genetic study on this subspecies suggests that the northern Namib Desert and Etosha National Park populations form a separate subspecies.
Lion	common	
Leopard	common	
Cheetah	uncommon	
Serval	rare	
Caracal	common	
Southern African wildcat	common	
Black-footed cat	very rare	
Black-backed jackal	very common	
Bat-eared fox	common	
Cape fox	common	
Cape wild dog	extinct	
Brown hyena	common	
Spotted hyena	common	
Aardwolf	common	
Meerkat	common	
Banded mongoose	common	
Yellow mongoose	common	
Slender mongoose	common	
Dwarf mongoose	uncommon	
Common genet	common	
Common warthog	common	
Scrub hare	common	
Springhare	common	
African ground squirrel	very common	
Honey badger	common	
Aardvark	common	
Cape porcupine	common	
Ground pangolin (Manis temminckii)	uncommon	
Plains zebra	very common	
Mountain zebra	locally common	Seen only in western Etosha
Springbok	very common	
Black-faced impala	common	
Gemsbok	common	
Common duiker	uncommon	
Damara dik-dik	common	
Steenbok	common	
Red hartebeest	common	
Blue wildebeest	common	
Common eland	uncommon	
Greater kudu	common	

=== Birds ===
This overview is only an indication of the diversity of birds in the park and is not a complete list.

South African ostrich

Vultures

- Lappet-faced vulture
- White-backed vulture

Eagles

- Martial eagle
- Tawny eagle
- Bateleur
- Booted eagle
- Circaetus eagles
- Verreaux's eagle

Secretarybird

Other hawks

- African harrier-hawk
- Pale chanting goshawk
- Shikra

Kites

- Yellow-billed kite
- Black-winged kite

Falcons

- Lanner falcon
- Greater kestrel
- Lesser kestrel
- Pygmy falcon
- Red-necked falcon
- Peregrine falcon
- Red-footed falcon
- Amur falcon

Owls

- Verreaux's eagle-owl
- Western barn owl
- African scops owl

Storks

- Abdim's stork
- Marabou stork
- White stork

Blue crane

Great white pelican

Flamingos

- Lesser flamingo
- Greater flamingo

Waterfowl

- Red-billed teal
- Egyptian goose
- Knob-billed duck
- Cape teal

Galliformes

- Helmeted guineafowl
- Red-billed spurfowl

Coursers and pratincoles

- Temminck's courser
- Double-banded courser
- Three-banded courser
- Black-winged pratincole

Waders

- Spotted thick-knee
- Three-banded plover
- Crowned lapwing
- Blacksmith lapwing

Rollers

- Lilac-breasted roller
- Purple roller
- European roller

African hoopoe

Hornbills

- Monteiro's hornbill
- Southern yellow-billed hornbill
- African grey hornbill

Crows

- Pied crow
- Cape crow

Sandgrouse

- Namaqua sandgrouse
- Double-banded sandgrouse

Pigeons and doves

- Namaqua dove
- Emerald-spotted wood dove
- Ring-necked dove
- Laughing dove

Other passerines

- Red-billed quelea
- Southern masked weaver
- Lesser masked weaver
- Sociable weaver
- Cape sparrow
- Cape starling
- Herero chat

Bustards

- Kori bustard
- Northern black korhaan
- Rüppell's korhaan
- Red-crested korhaan

Shrikes and Bushshrikes

- Red-backed shrike
- Lesser grey shrike
- Southern white-crowned shrike
- Magpie shrike
- Crimson-breasted shrike
- Grey-headed bushshrike
- Gorgeous bushshrike
- Orange-breasted bushshrike

Waxbills

- Violet-eared waxbill
- Black-faced waxbill
- Blue waxbill
- Orange-breasted waxbill
- Common waxbill

Bulbuls

- African red-eyed bulbul
- Dark-capped bulbul

Larks

- Dusky lark
- Sabota lark
- Rufous-naped lark
- Monotonous lark
- Eastern clapper lark
- Spike-heeled lark
- Red-capped lark
- Flappet lark
- Fawn-coloured lark

Herons

- Grey heron
- Cattle egret

== See also ==
- Okonjima
