= Okaukuejo =

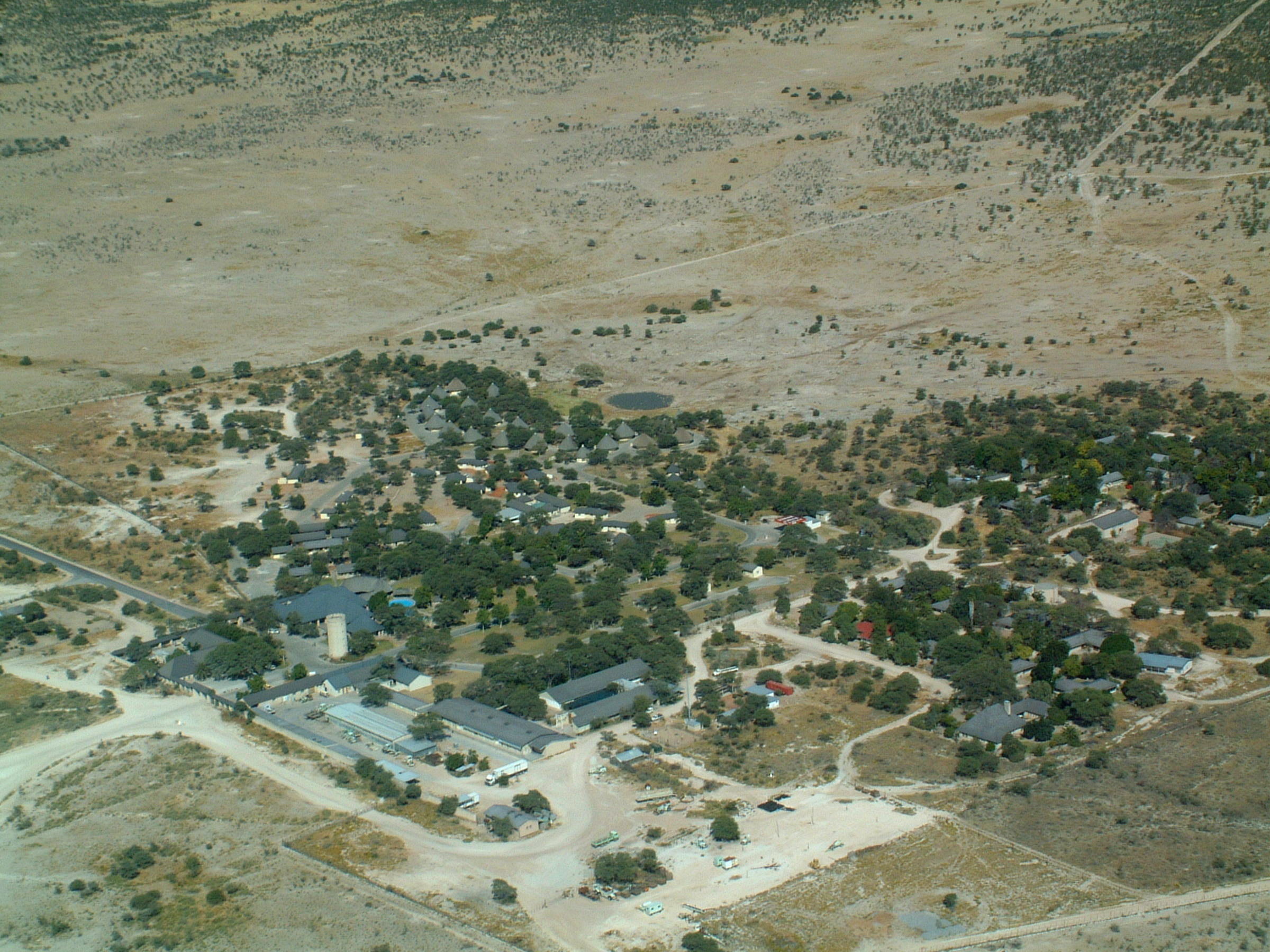
- Aerial view of Okaukuejo

- Location in Namibia
- Coordinates: 19°11′S 15°56′E
- Country: Namibia
- Region: Oshana Region
- Time zone: UTC+1 (South African Standard Time)

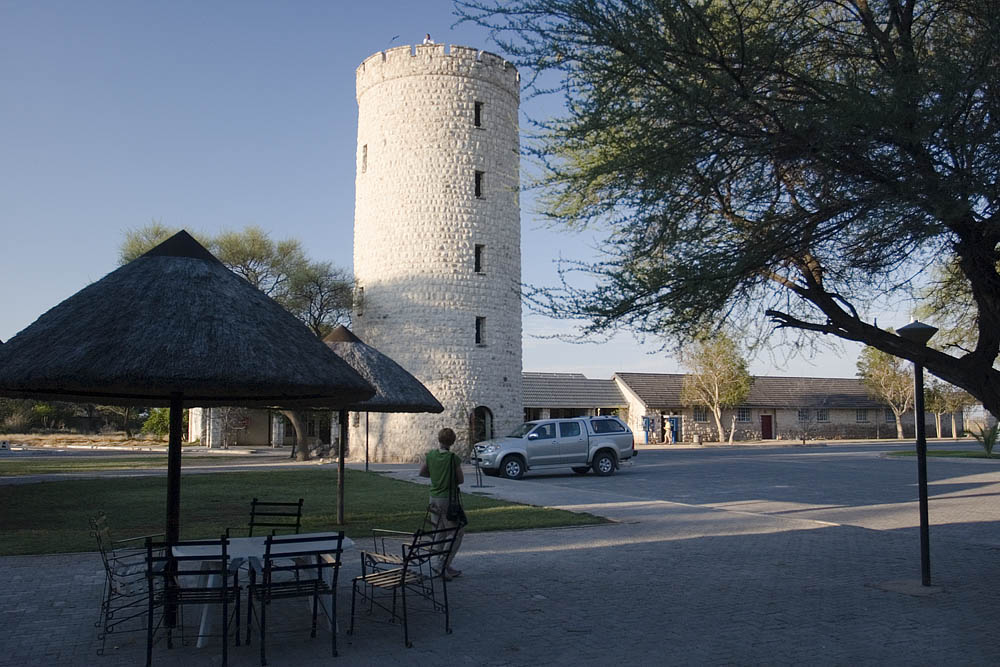
Tower of Okaukuejo

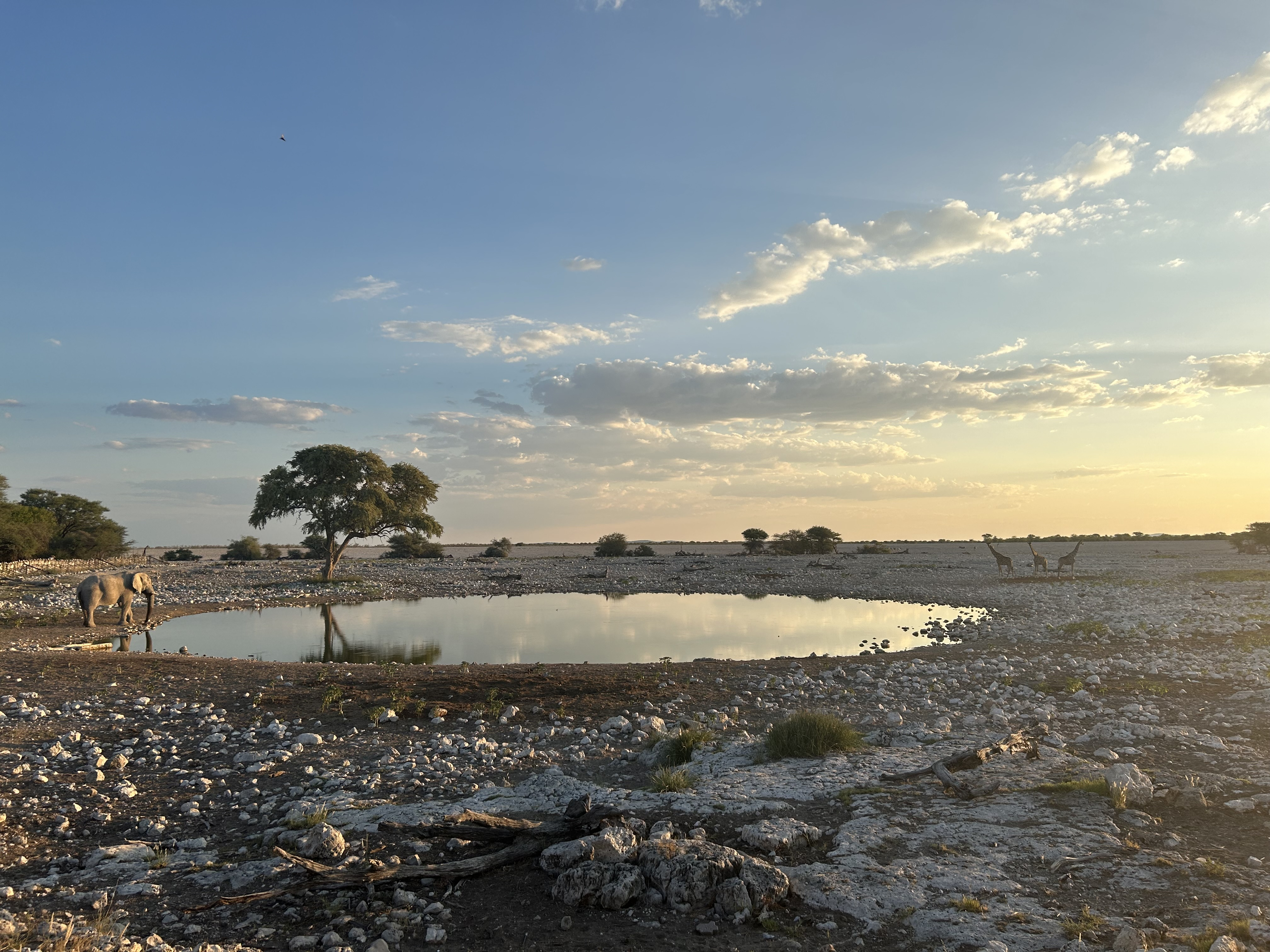
Waterhole Okaukuejo Camp in Etosha National Park at dawn

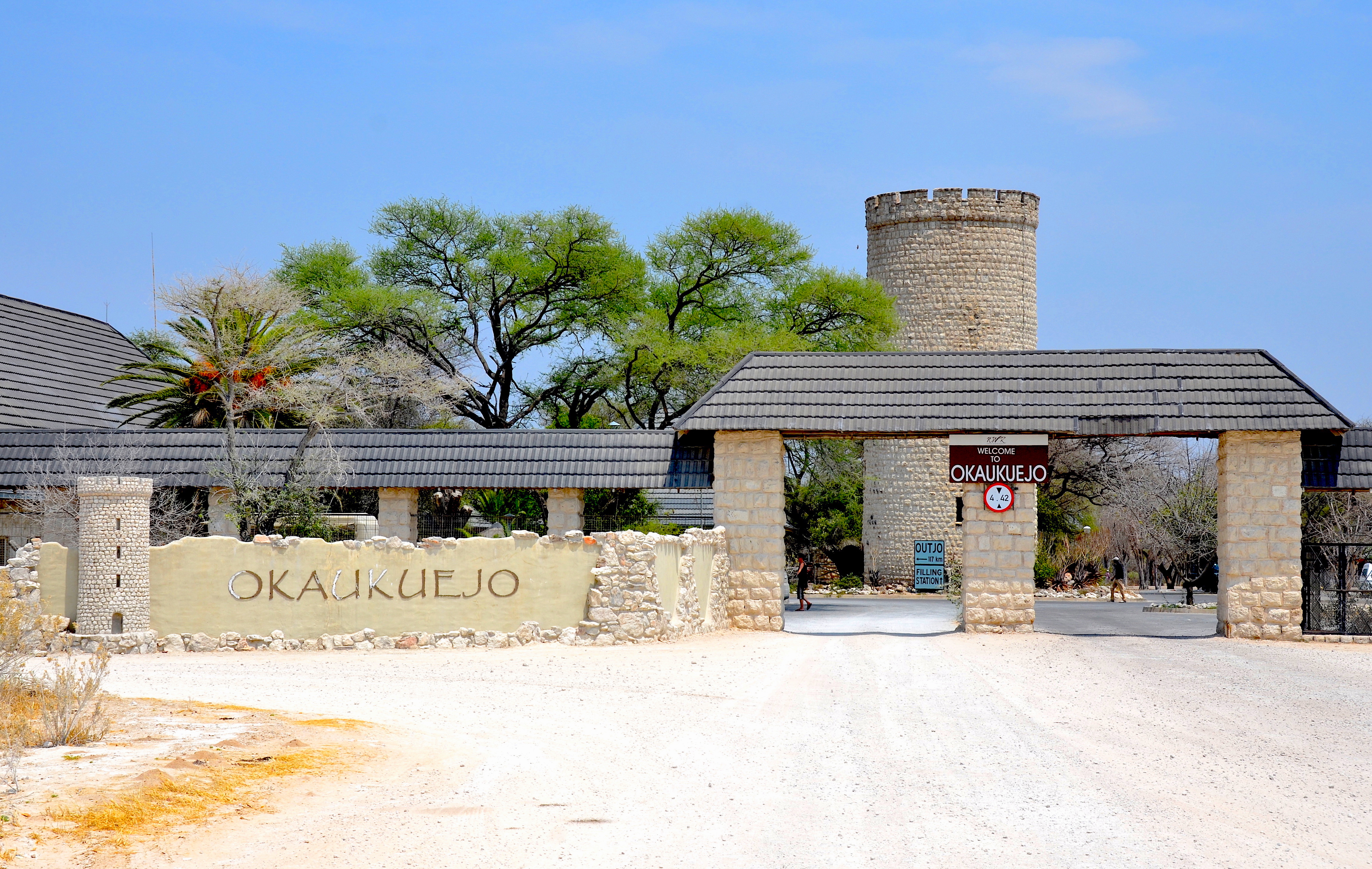
Entrance of Okaukuejo (2014)

Okaukuejo is the administrative center for the Etosha National Park in Namibia. It is located approximately 650 km from the capital Windhoek. An average annual rainfall of around 350 millimetres (14 in) is received, although in the 2010/2011 rainy season 676 millimetres (26.6 in) were measured.

Originally the western end of the Red Line, a veterinary control demarcation established in 1896, and the site of a German fort built in 1901, the round watchtower is a remnant of the fort. A major attraction for tourists is the permanent waterhole, illuminated at night, which draws all types of wildlife, including elephants, lions and black rhinoceros, particularly during the lengthy dry season.

The Namibian National Park Service also maintains a tourist camp. There is a variety of resort facilities from camping sites to housekeeping cottages with braai facilities. There is also a swimming pool, a restaurant and a bar. There are two small stores. One store sells basic foods and firewood for a braai.

Okaukuejo houses the Etosha Ecological Institute, founded in 1974.
