= Twyfelfontein =

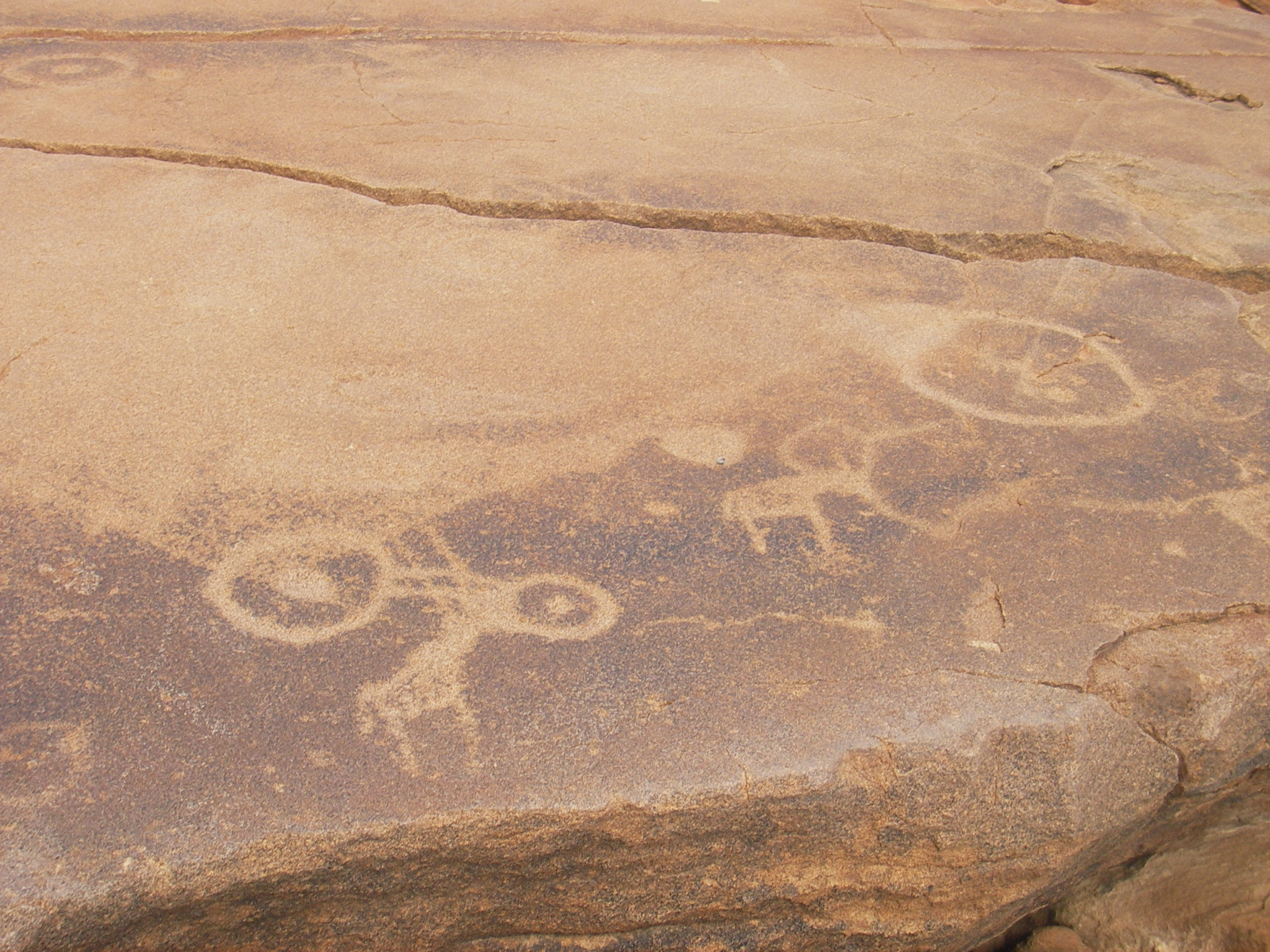
- A sandstone slab at Twyfelfontein. The animals are the older engravings, overlaid by the circles.

- Location in Namibia
- Coordinates: 20°35′26″S 14°22′20″E
- Country: Namibia
- Region: Kunene Region
- Constituency: Khorixas Constituency

Area
  - Land: 0.222 sq mi (0.574 km^{2})
  - Water: 0 sq mi (0 km^{2})
- Elevation: 1,800 ft (550 m)
- Time zone: UTC+1 (South African Standard Time)

UNESCO World Heritage Site
- Official name: Twyfelfontein or /Ui-//aes
- Criteria: Cultural: (iii), (v)
- Reference: 1255
- Inscription: 2007 (31st Session)
- Area: 57.4 ha (142 acres)
- Buffer zone: 9,194.5 ha (22,720 acres)

Twyfelfontein (Afrikaans: uncertain spring), officially known as ǀUi-ǁAis (Damara/Nama: jumping waterhole), is a site of ancient rock engravings in the Kunene Region of north-western Namibia. It consists of a spring in a valley flanked by the slopes of a sandstone table mountain that receives very little rainfall and has a wide range of diurnal temperatures.

The site has been inhabited for 6,000 years, first by hunter-gatherers and later by Khoikhoi herders. Both ethnic groups used it as a place of worship and a site to conduct shamanist rituals. In the process of these rituals at least 2,500 items of rock carvings have been created, as well as a few rock paintings. Displaying one of the largest concentrations of rock petroglyphs in Africa, UNESCO approved Twyfelfontein as Namibia's first World Heritage Site in 2007.

== History ==
Twyfelfontein valley has been inhabited by Stone-age hunter-gatherers of the Wilton stone age culture group since approximately 6,000 years ago. They made most of the engravings and probably all the paintings. 2,000 to 2,500 years ago the Khoikhoi, an ethnic group related to the San (Bushmen), occupied the valley, then known under its Damara/Nama name ǀUi-ǁAis (jumping waterhole). The Khoikhoi also produced rock art which can clearly be distinguished from the older engravings.

The area was uninhabited by Europeans until after World War II, when a severe drought caused white Afrikaans speaking farmers (Boers) to move in. The farm was later procured by the apartheid government as part of the Odendaal Plan and became part of the Damaraland bantustan. The white settlers left in 1965.

Topographer Reinhard Maack, who also discovered the White Lady rock painting at Brandberg, reported the presence of rock engravings in the area in 1921. A more thorough investigation was only conducted after David Levin studied the feasibility of farming in 1947. He rediscovered the spring but struggled to extract enough water to sustain his family and his herd. Slowly becoming obsessed with doubts about the capacity of the spring an Afrikaans-speaking friend began calling him David Twyfelfontein (David Doubts-the-spring) in jest. When Levin bought the land and registered his farm in 1948 he gave it the name Twyfelfontein. While commonly being translated as doubtful spring, a more accurate translation for the word twyfel is therefore "questionable" or "uncertain".

In 1950 scientific investigation of the rock art started with an investigation by Ernst Rudolph Scherz who described over 2500 rock engravings on 212 sandstone slabs. Today it is estimated that the site contains more than 5000 individual depictions.

The British Museum states, in its webpage about Twyfelfontein, that the dates recovered from radiocarbon dating ranged widely from c.5,850-180 BP (years before present), and that the relationship between periods of occupation or site use and the production of rock art is not known, but based on archaeological evidence from around the wider area it is thought that engravings in the styles found at Twyfelfontein range from around 6,000 to around 1,000 years old, though some may be more recent.

== Location and description ==
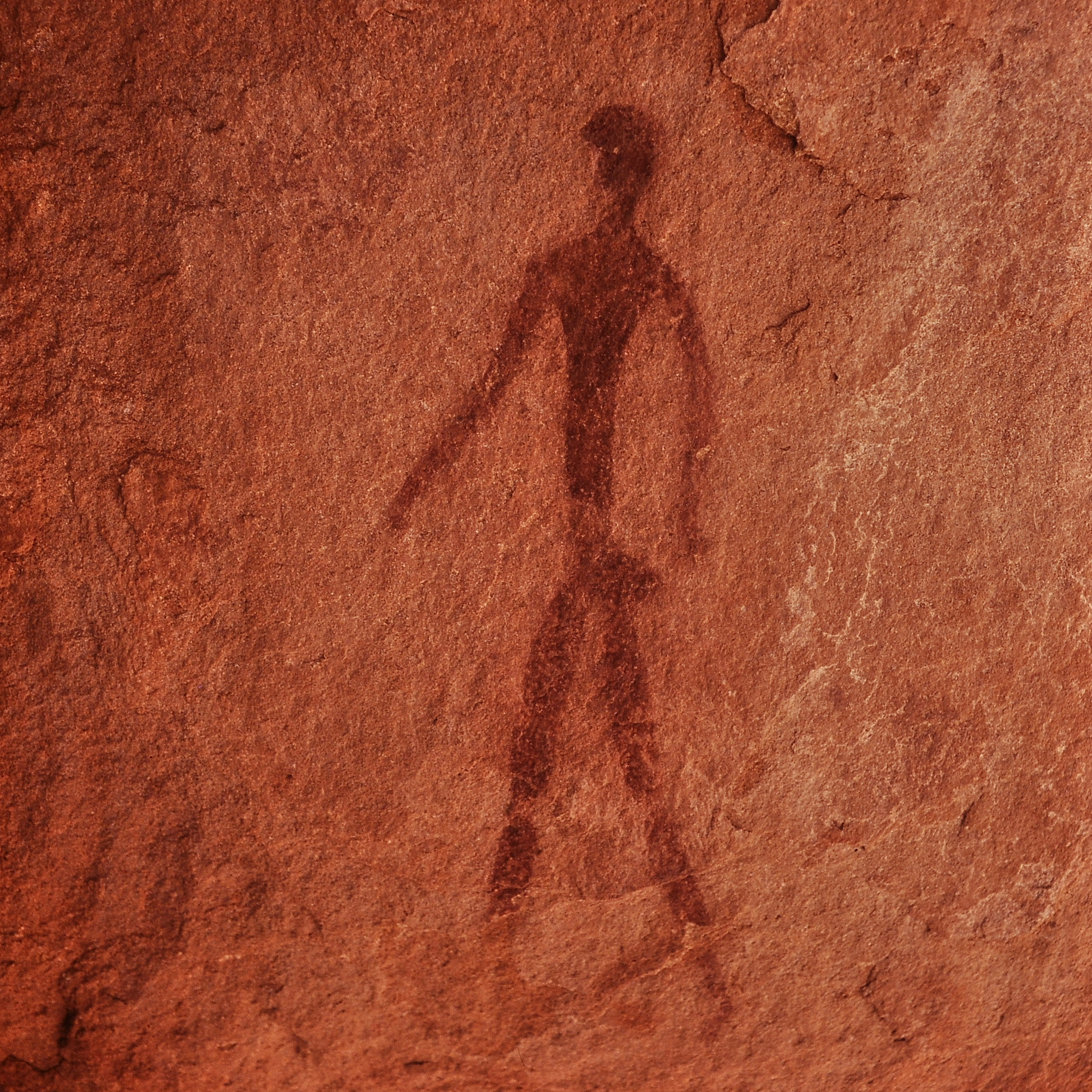
Rock painting of a man

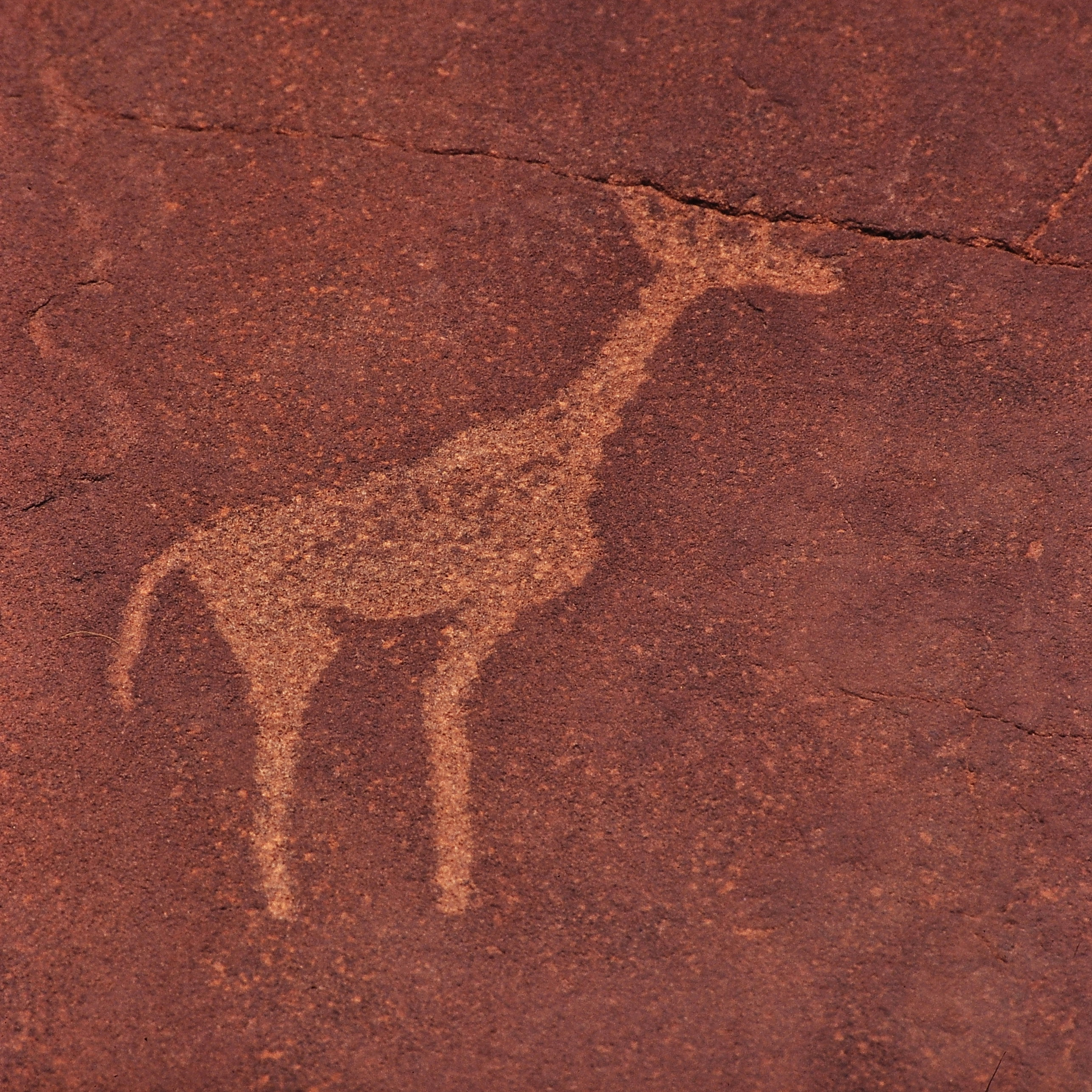
Rock engraving of a giraffe

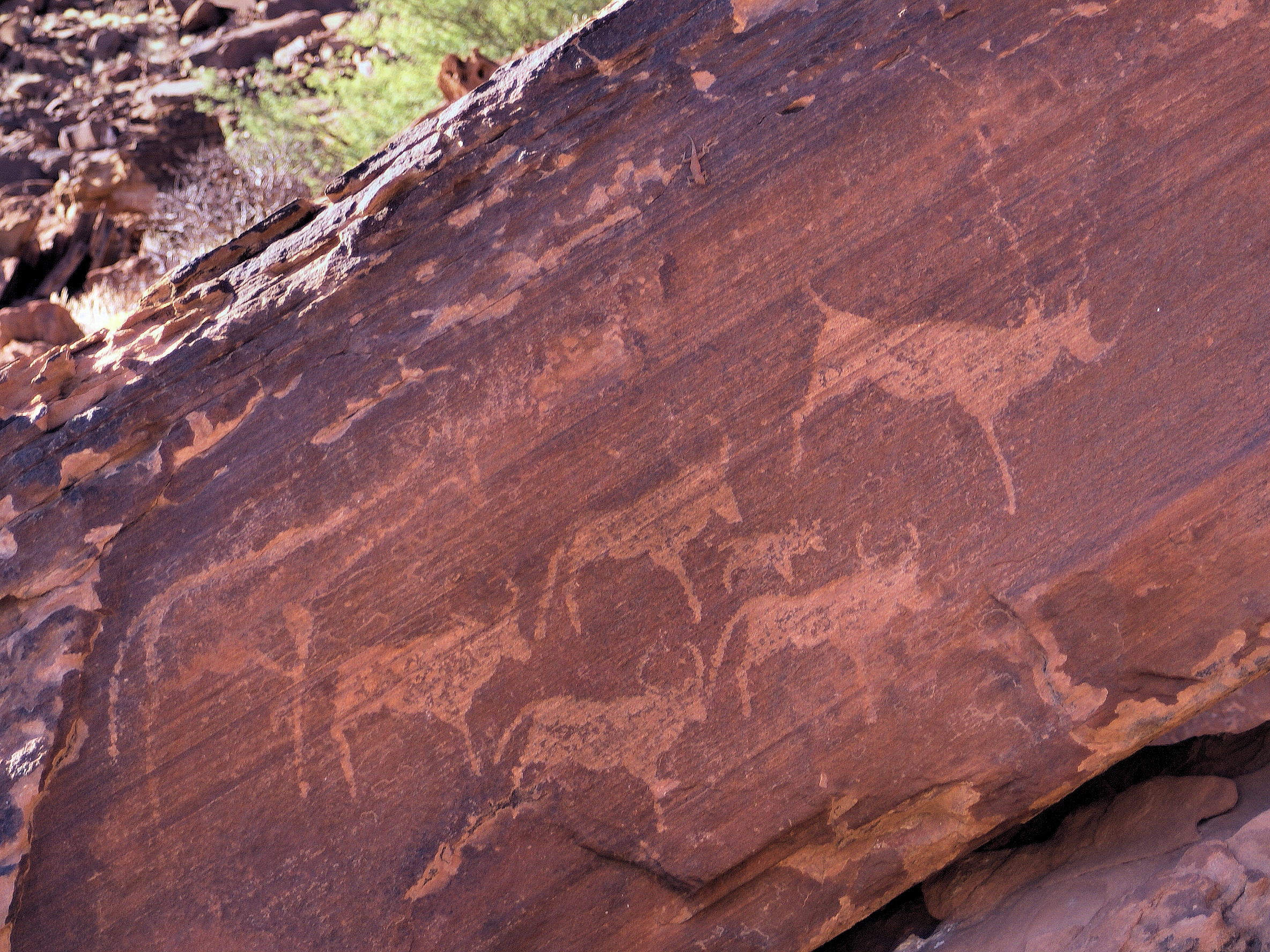
Giraffe and cattle

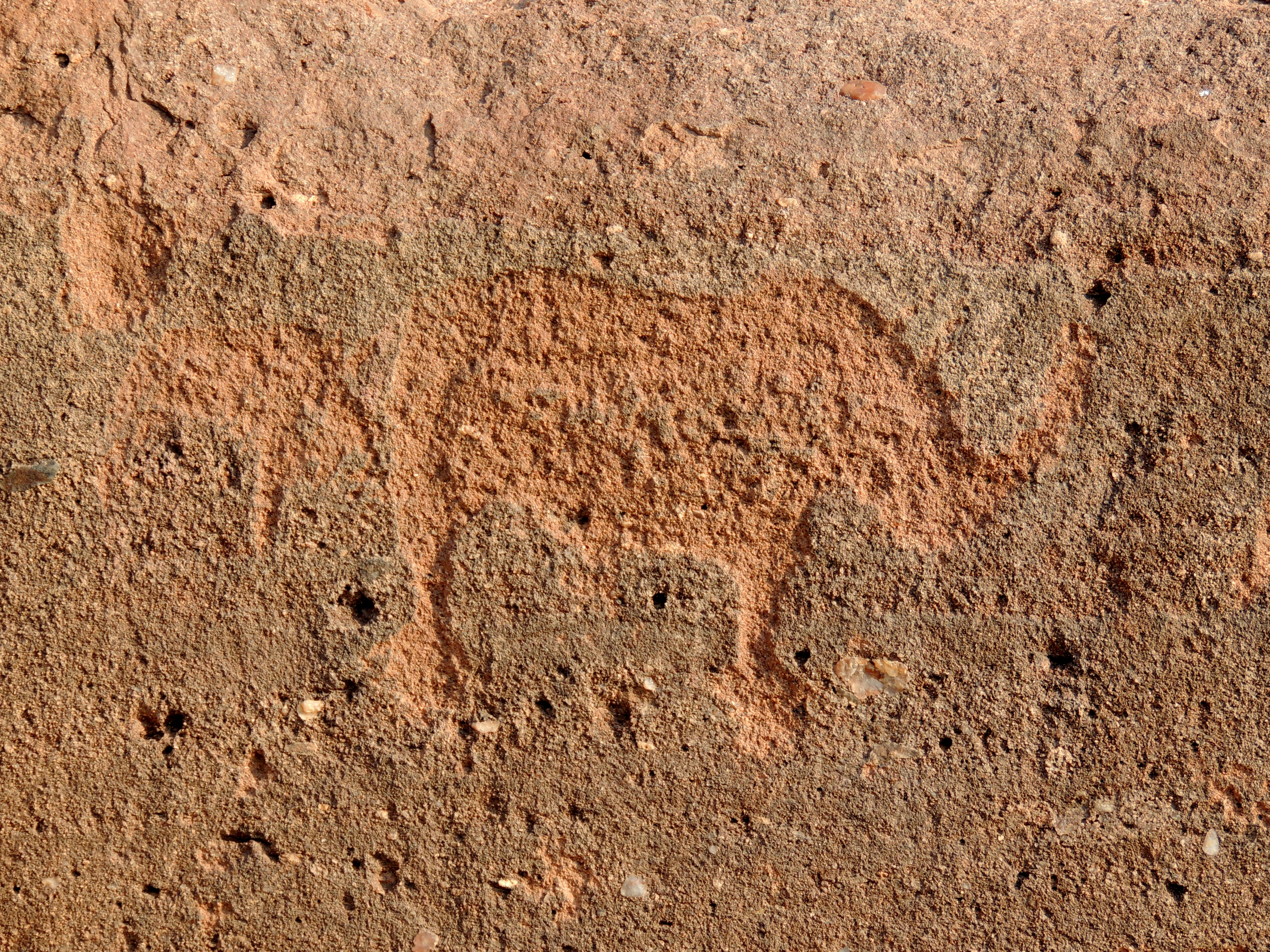
Rhinoceros

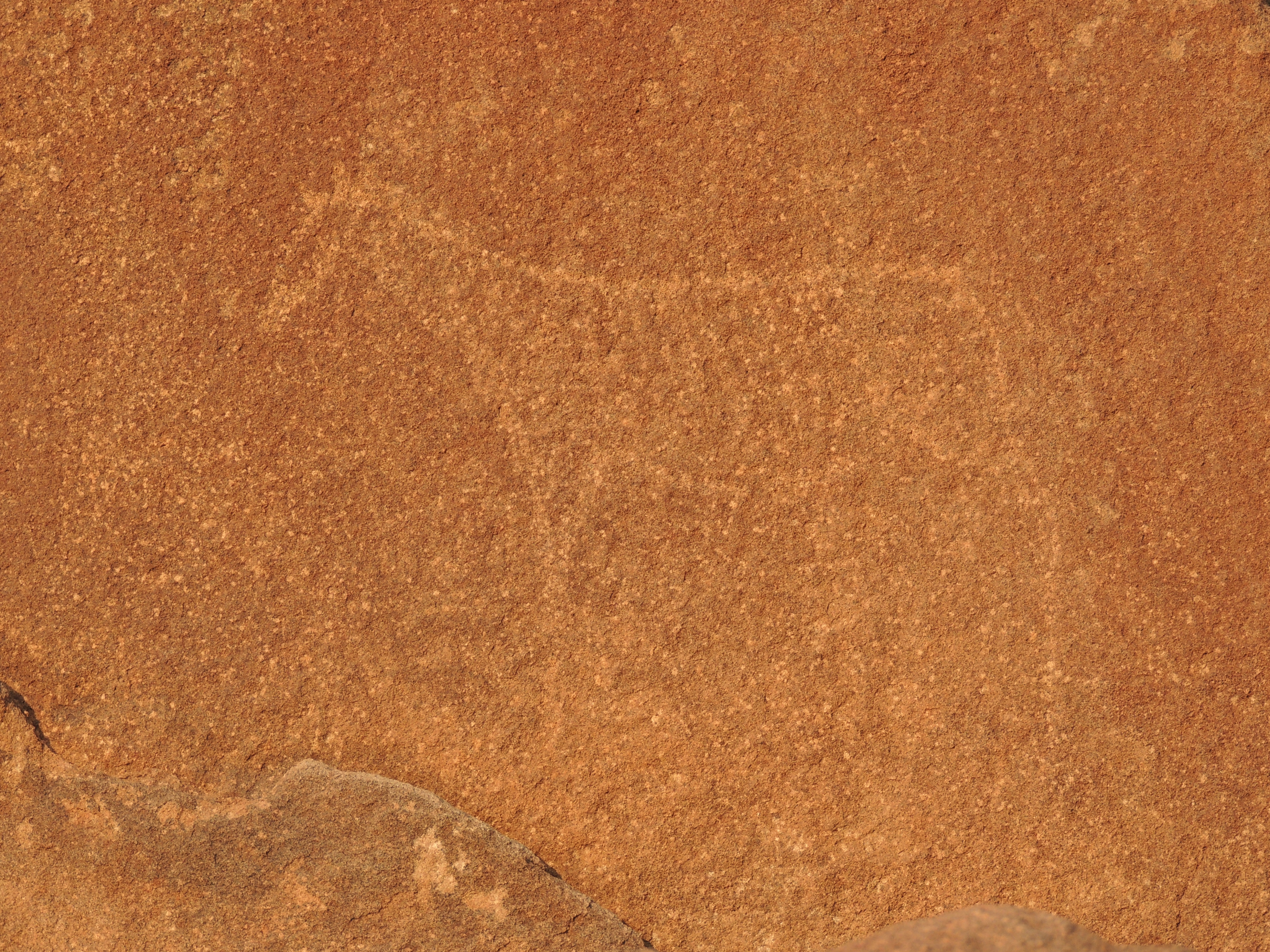
Zebra

Twyfelfontein is situated in the southern Kunene Region of Namibia, an area formerly known as Damaraland. The site lies on the banks of the Aba Huab River in the Huab valley of the Mount Etjo formation. The rocks containing the art work are situated in a valley flanked by the slopes of a sandstone table mountain. An underground aquifer on an impermeable layer of shale sustains a spring in this otherwise very dry area. The name Twyfelfontein refers to the spring itself, to the valley containing the spring, and in the context of traveling and tourism also to a greater area containing nearby tourist attractions: the rock engravings, the Organ Pipes, Burnt Mountain, Doros crater, and the Petrified Forest. The World Heritage Site covers the area of rock engravings.

The area is a transitional zone between semi desert, savanna, and shrubland and receives less than 150 mm (5.9 in) annual rainfall. Diurnal temperatures vary from 10 to 28 °C (50 to 82 °F) in the winter month of July and 21 to 35 °C (70 to 95 °F) in the summer month of November.

Twyfelfontein lies 20 km (12 mi) south of the C39 major road from Sesfontein to Khorixas. From there it is connected by the district road D3214. The Twyfelfontein Country Lodge features a gravel airstrip. The lodge, camp site, visitor's centre and most of the other tourist facilities are managed as a joint venture between the lodge owners and the Twyfelfontein-Uibasen Conservancy.

The rock art area consists of fourteen smaller sites that have been introduced by Scherz in his initial site survey. They are still used to describe the location of artworks in Twyfelfontein:

Site number	Site name [Translation]	Coordinates	Important contents
1	Nördlich des Zeremonienplatzes [North of the Place of Ceremonies]	20°33′53″S 14°21′52″E	65 engravings; 2 large giraffes with a fine–pecked infill
2	Zeremonienplatz [Place of Ceremonies]	20°34′15″S 14°22′11″E	more than 175 engravings; cave with rock paintings; rare engravings of hand prints
3	Die Sieben Tafeln [The Seven Slabs]	20°34′27″S 14°22′38″E	150–175 engravings; 2 superimpositioned engravings; 4–toed human foot print and one parent–child grouping
4	Die Sieben Tafeln [The Seven Slabs] Outlier	20°34′35″S 14°22′34″E	2 giraffe in excellent condition; rough work, possibly jackal
5	Hasenblock [Hare Rock Block]	20°34′45″S 14°22′23″E	40 engravings and 30 paintings; 18 human pictures in different postures; horned kudu bull with giraffe legs
6	Twyfelfontein Main Site Complex	20°34′27″S 14°22′38″E	Symbolfelsen [Symbol's rock] with geometric imagery; red pigment rock paintings
7	The Boulder Field	20°35′41″S 14°22′21″E	120 rock engravings, over 200 cupules; ostrich depiction joined to equid by a pecked line
8	Die große Wohnfläche [The Large Living Area]	20°35′36″S 14°22′30″E	50 rock engravings, 43 rock paintings, 70 pieces of geometric imagery; dancing kudu ("Fabeltier")
9	Die südliche Wohnfläche [The Southern Living Area]	20°35′50″S 14°22′31″E	250 rock engravings, 40 pieces of geometric imagery; giraffe with three waving lines attached to its head; Riesenblock [giant slab] with sitting giraffe
10	Die rechte Talseite [The Right Valley Side]	20°35′51″S 14°22′30″E	75 rock engravings on 15 slabs; Löwenplatte [Lion's Slab] with Lion Man
11	Die linke Talseite [The Left Valley Side]	20°35′54″S 14°22′31″E	150 rock engravings on 30 slabs, approximately 24 pieces of geometric imagery; Affenplatte [Monkey slab] with an engraved pecked-infill human figure; Halbmondplatte [Half moon slab] with sitting giraffe; giant elephant and rhino
12	Der Westliche Berghang [The Western Hill Slope]	20°35′53″S 14°22′29″E	Carstenplatte [Carsten's Slab] with several pecked animal engravings
13	Am Fuß des Westlichen Berghangs [Bottom of the Western Hill]	20°35′52″S 14°22′26″E	120 engravings on 10 rock blocks; Spoor rock with several animal footprints and a 7–toed feline
14	Beim Großen Malereiblock [At the Large Paint Block]	20°35′56″S 14°22′23″E	20 engravings and 25 paintings in a cave–like overhang structure; best–preserved paintings in the valley
15	Beim Großen Malereiblock [At the Large Paint Block] Outlier	20°35′58″S 14°22′13″E	engraved cluster with animal spoor and cupules

== Artworks ==
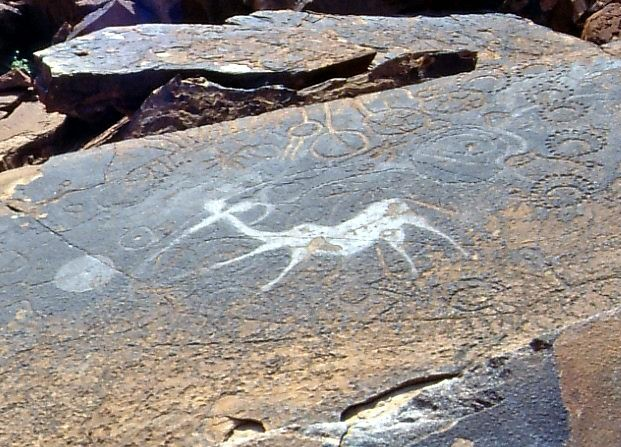
The dancing Kudu

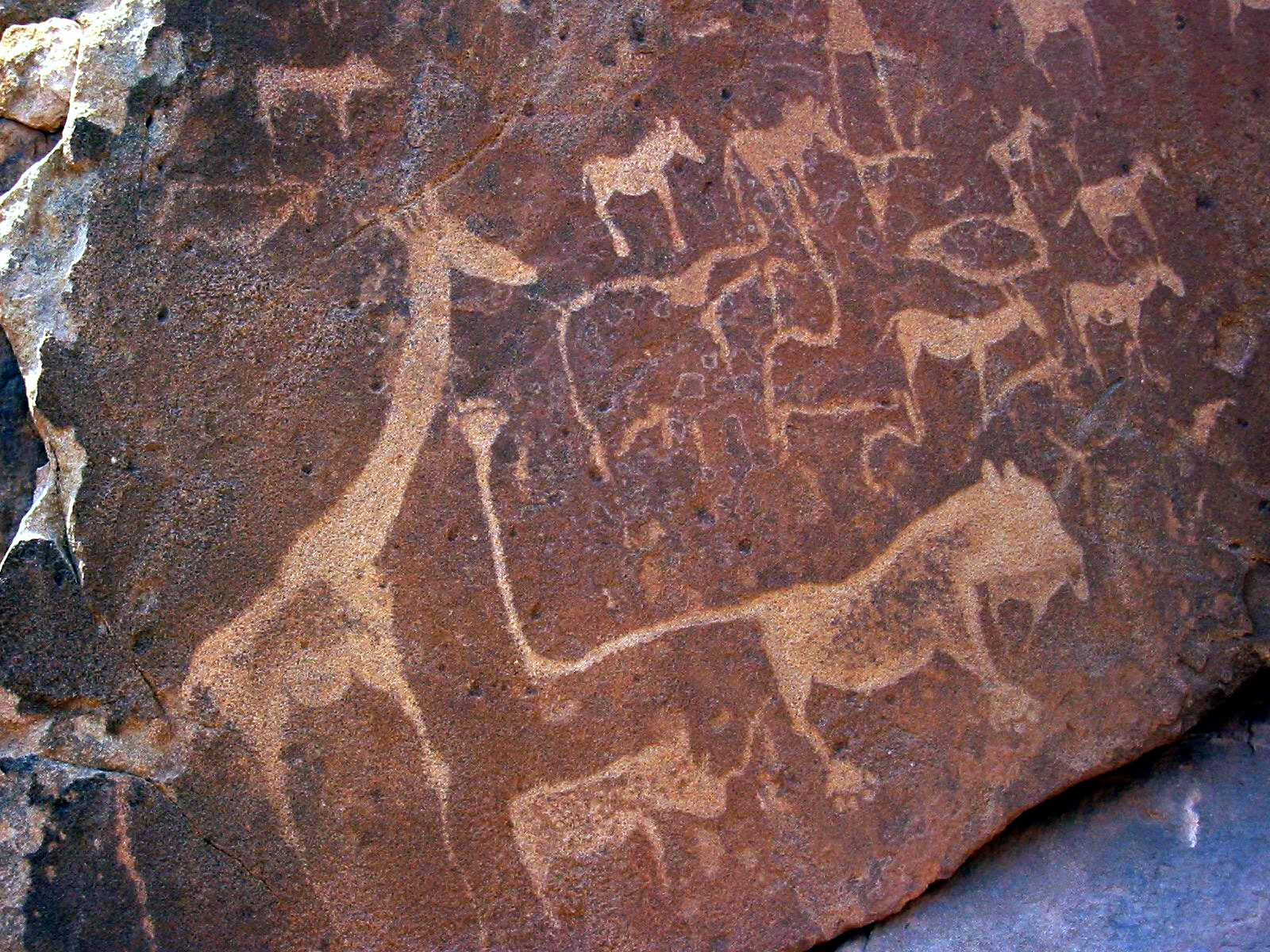
Lion Plate with Lion Man, a creature with human toes, an overly long tail with a rectangular kink and a pugmark at its tip

Sandstone rocks at Twyfelfontein are covered by the so-called desert varnish, a hard patina that appears brown or dark grey. Engravings were effected by chiseling through this patina, exposing the lighter rock underneath. The indentations were created over the course of thousands of years. The oldest engravings might be as old as 10,000 years, and the creation of new works probably ended by the arrival of pastoral tribes around 1000 AD. Three different types of engravings can be distinguished at Twyfelfontein:

- iconic imagery (images of animals, humans, and fantasy creatures)
- pictograms (geometric rock art like pecked circles, rows of dots)
- indentations for or from everyday use (grinding hollows, board games, gong stones)

Additionally, the site contains rock paintings at 13 different locations, with depictions of humans painted in red ochre in six rock shelters. The similar occurrence of rock paintings and rock engravings is very rare.

The hunter-gatherers made most of the iconic engravings and probably all the paintings. The carvings represent animals such as rhinoceroses, elephants, ostriches and giraffes as well as depictions of human and animal footprints. Some of the figures, most prominently the "Lion Man"—a lion with an extremely long rectangular kinked tail ending in a six-toed pugmark— depict the transformation of humans into animals. This transformation and the depiction of animals together with their tracks make it likely that they were created as part of shamanist rituals. The more simplistic perception that they only show hunter-gatherers' attempts to acquire food is now thought to be naïve.

Engravings of animals that certainly never occurred in this area, like a sea lion, penguins, and possibly flamingos indicate that the hunter-gatherers might have ventured to the coast more than 100 km (62 mi) away. A modern archaeological survey led by Sven Ouzman questions these descriptions of Scherz' initial investigation and describes the not easily recognisable fauna as "strange animals"—rough work of animals, possibly giraffe, that did occur at Twyfelfontein.

The Khoikhoi herders produced the geometric imagery, probably depicting herder groups. They are also the creators of the more worldly indentations in that area that served as grinding hollows and game boards. Some of the stones bear marks from use as gong stones, which make unusual sounds when hit.

== Archaeology ==
The archaeological name of the site is Twyfelfontein 534. It is subdivided into 15 smaller sites as described by Scherz in 1975. Objects from the site include a variety of stone tools made mostly from quartzite. Type and shape of these tools indicate not only the use on rock but also the prevalence of wood and leather working. Artwork such as pendants and beads from ostrich eggshell fragments have been found at several places. Of the items of daily use charcoal and bone fragments have been excavated as well as undecorated pottery fragments, although the pottery might have originated from early farmers rather than the Stone Age culture that produced the rock art.

The archaeological value of the site does not compare with its importance as rock art collection. The findings do, however, support the shamanist origin of the engravings because food remains from the site proved to be bones of small antelope, rock dassie and even lizards rather than the large species depicted.

== Site protection and recognition ==
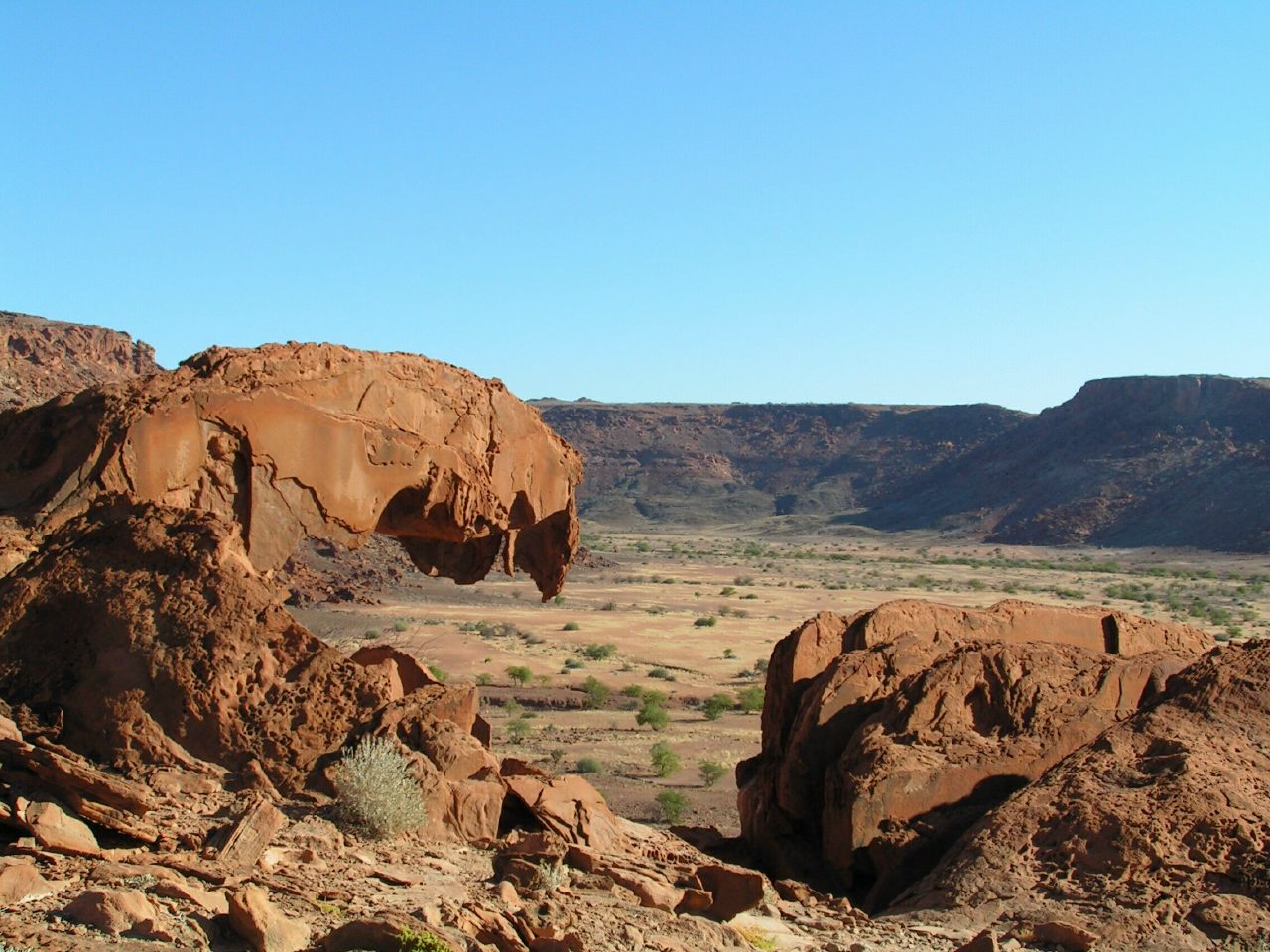
The "lion's mouth" rock formation throning on top of Huab valley

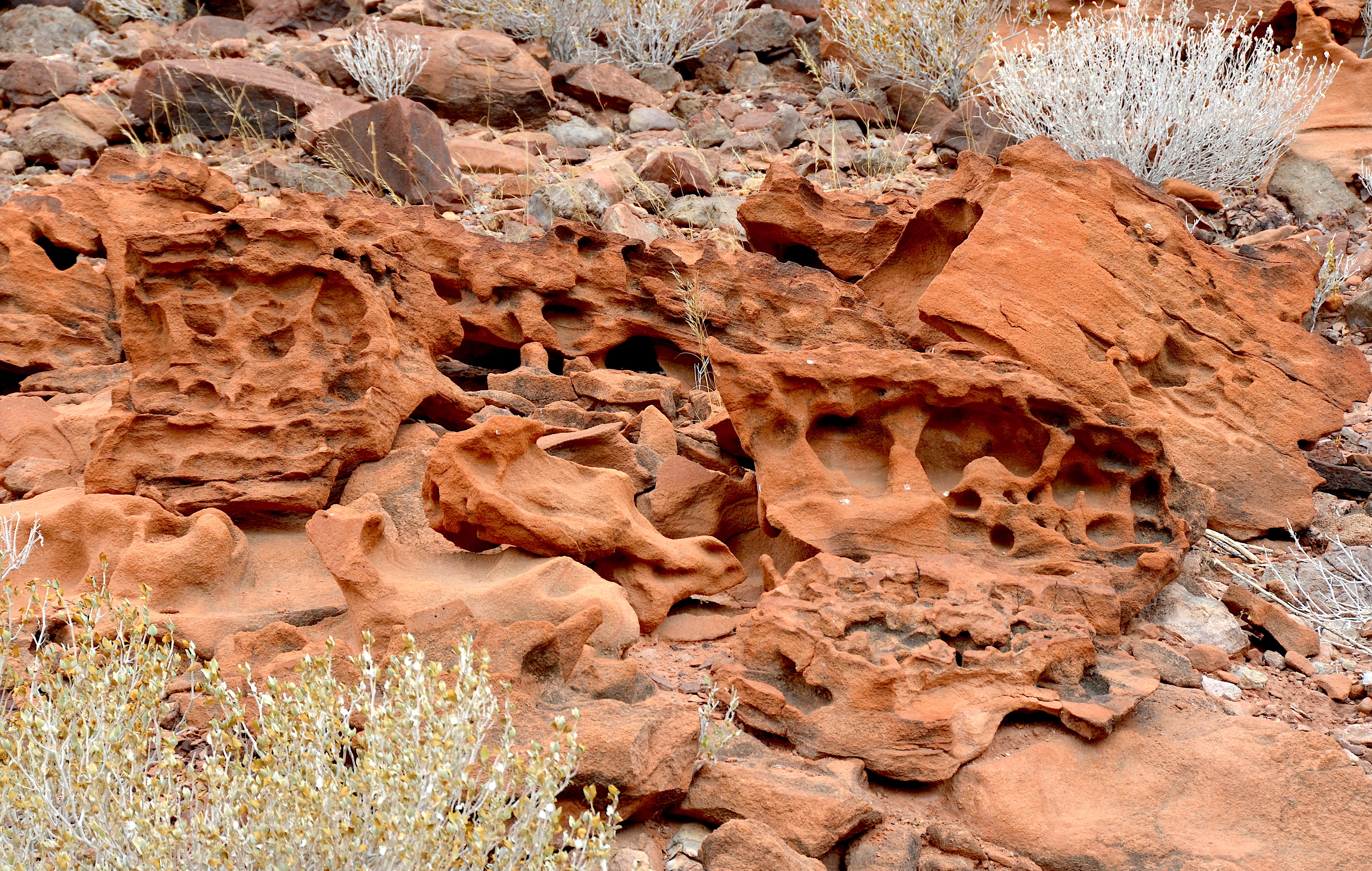
Tafoni at Twyfelfontein

On 15 Aug 1952 the area was declared a National Monument by the South West African administration. Despite its early recognition, the site was left unguarded until 1986 when the entire area was declared a nature reserve. As a result, many of the petroglyphs were damaged or removed. Additionally, visitors have left their own graffiti on the sandstone slabs.

Under Namibian legislation, the site is now protected under Section 54 of the National Heritage Act. In 2007, UNESCO approved Twyfelfontein as Namibia's first World Heritage Site as one of the largest concentrations of rock petroglyphs in Africa. The organisation recognised "a coherent, extensive and high quality record of ritual practices relating to hunter-gather communities [...] over at least two millennia" (criterion iii), and "links between ritual and economic practices in the apparent sacred association of the land adjacent to an aquifer" according to criterion V of the cultural selection criteria. Twyfelfontein was Namibia's only World Heritage Site until 2013 when the Namib Sand Sea was listed.

To achieve having the site listed by UNESCO, the government of Namibia defined a buffer zone of 91.9 km^{2} (35.5 sq mi) to protect the visual setting. In the 0.6 km^{2} (0.2 sq mi) core site, grazing is restricted and the establishment of tourism facilities is prohibited. Although Twyfelfontein is regarded as "generally intact", the Twyfelfontein Country Lodge within the "Zeremonienplatz" (Place of Ceremonies) rock engraving site in the buffer zone is of concern to UNESCO, who stated "This has severely compromised the integrity of the rock engravings in this area." The hiking trail allowed visitors unsupervised access and is seen as running too close to many of the rock-art sites. Site management has, however, improved since applying for World Heritage status, particularly with regards to visitor management; unsupervised hiking is no longer allowed.

== References and literature ==
=== Literature ===
- Ouzman, Sven. "Rock Art of Twyfelfontein, Namibia, Africa. Twyfelfontein Site Report". Bradshaw Foundation. Archived from the original on 21 October 2014.
- Scherz, Ernst-Rudolf (1975). Felsbilder in Südwest-Afrika. Teil II: Die Gravierungen im Nordwesten Südwest-Afrikas [Rock Art in South-West Africa. Volume II: The engravings in north-western South West Africa] (in German). Cologne: Böhlau Verlag. ISBN 978-3-412-03374-3.
- Breunig, Peter (2014). Archäologischer Reiseführer Namibia (in German). Frankfurt a. M.: Africa Magna Verlag. ISBN 978-3-937248-39-4.
