= The White Lady (Namibia) =

Ancient rock painting

- Weiße Dame
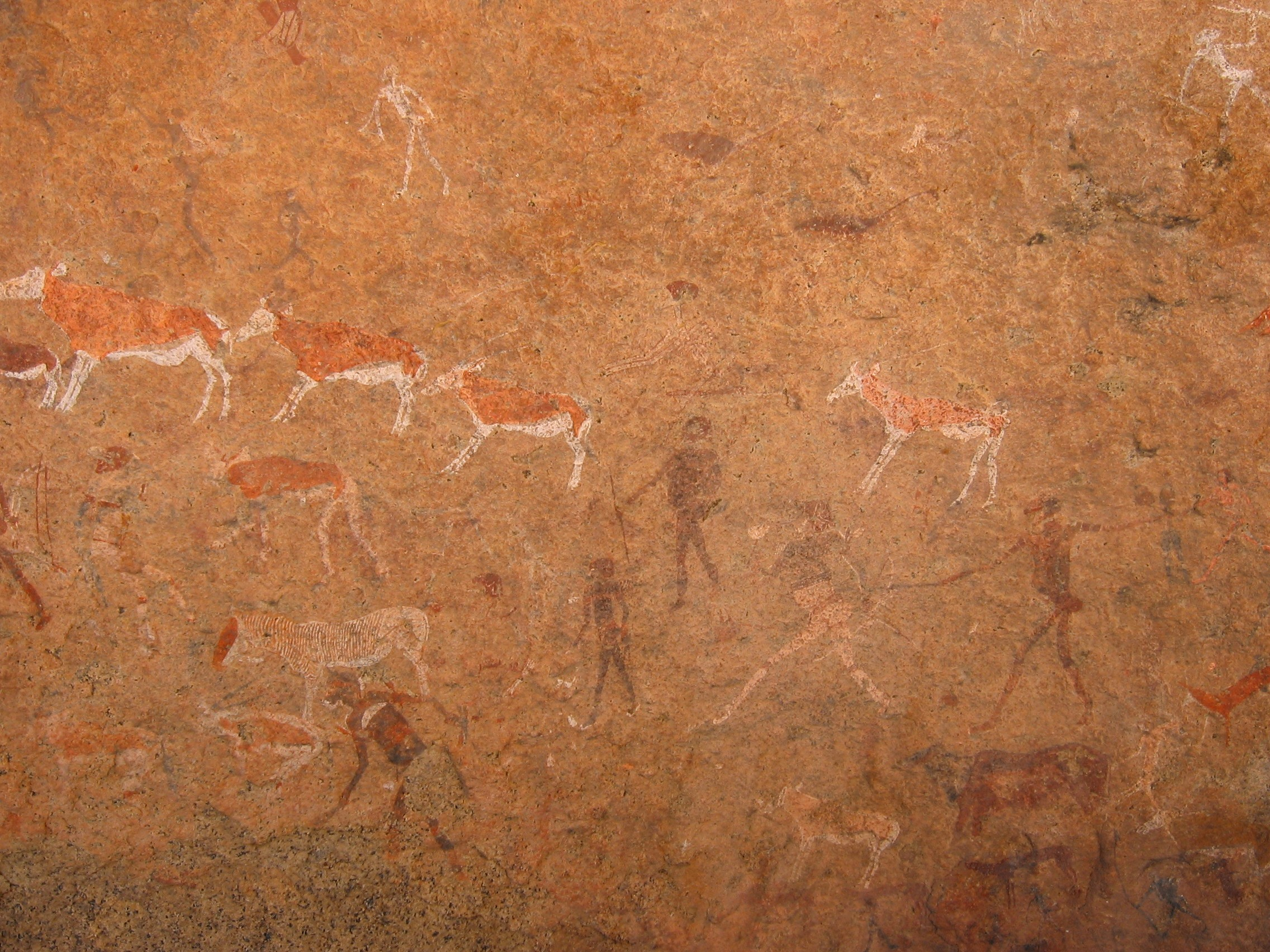
- White Lady, visible in the lower right corner

- Location in Namibia
- 21°06′38″S 14°39′46″E
- Periods: Iron Age
- Location: Brandberg Mountain, Damaraland
- Region: Namibia

Site notes
- Excavation dates: 1929
- Archaeologists: Reinhard Maack

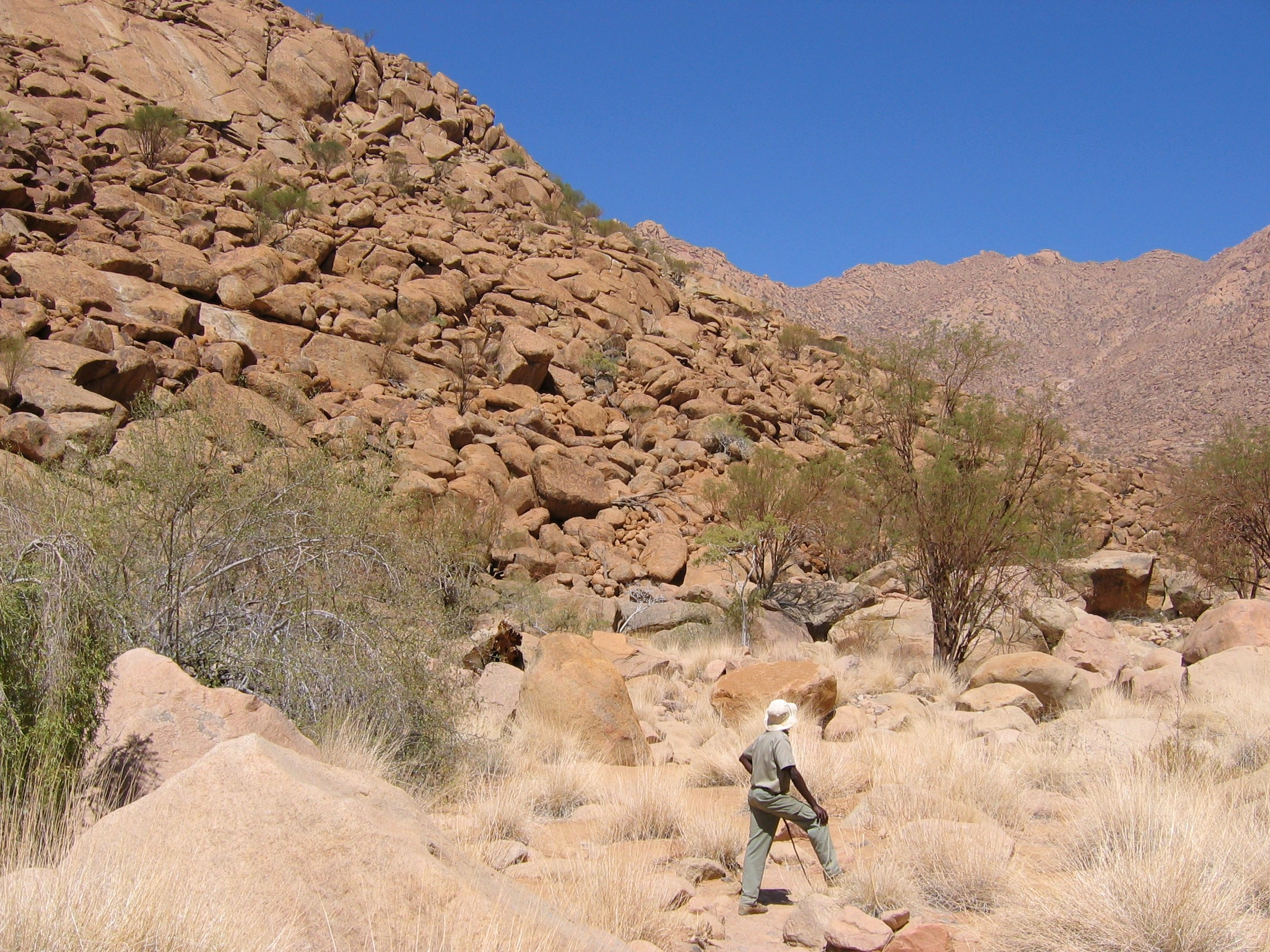
The path leading to the White Lady

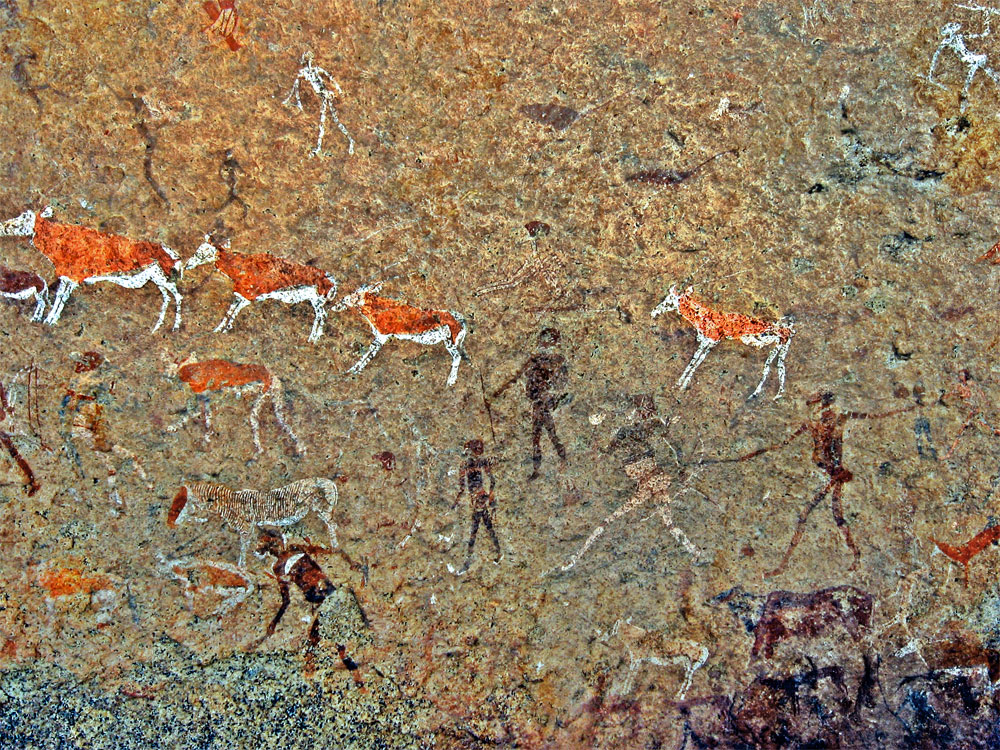
The White Lady, retouched picture emphasis on color and shape

The White Lady is a rock painting, located on a panel, which also displays other art work. The paintings can be found on a small rock overhang, deep within Brandberg Mountain. The giant granite monolith located in Damaraland and called 'The Brandberg' is Namibia's highest mountain. The painting's German name is Weiße Dame.

The painting has long been an archaeological dilemma, and several different hypotheses have been put forth on its origins, authorship and dating. It is now usually accepted to be a bushmen painting, dating back to at least 2 000 years.

== Location and description ==
The "White Lady" archaeological site is located close to the road from Khorixas to Henties Bay, in the area of Uis, on the Brandberg Massif. The Brandberg itself hosts over 1 000 bushmen paintings, scattered across rock shelters and caves.

The "White Lady Group" is found in a cave known as "Maack Shelter" (Note: After its modern discoverer, the German explorer Reinhard Maack.) and portrays several human figures as well as oryxes, on a rock panel measuring about 5.5 m x 1.5 m. The "White Lady" is the most detailed human figure in the group, and measures about 39.5 cm x 29 cm. To reach the White Lady it is necessary to hike for about 45–60 minutes over rough terrain, along the gorge of the normally dry Tsisab river.

It is usually assumed that the painting shows some sort of ritual dance, and that the "White Lady" is a shaman. She has white legs and arms, which may suggest that her body was painted or that she was wearing some sort of decorative attachments on her legs and arms. She holds a bow in one hand and perhaps a goblet in the other. Because of the bow and the oryxes, the painting has also been interpreted as a hunting scene. Apart from the shaman/lady, the other human figures have less detail, and are mostly completely black or completely white. One of the oryxes has human legs. The paint was probably made of ochre, charcoal, manganese, hematite with blood serum, egg white and casein used as binding agents.

The painting has undergone severe damage since it was first discovered in the early 20th century. For a few decades, tourists would pour water onto the painting to make the colors more clearly visible, causing the painting to fade quickly. The site is now a protected heritage site of Namibia and visiting is only permitted with official guides. For protection of the art works, bags and bottles are not allowed at the far end of the trail.

Because of tourist protests, the metal wire netting has been replaced by only two metal bars, to ensure a better view.

== Finding and interpretation controversy ==
The White Lady was first discovered in 1917 by German explorer and topographer Reinhard Maack as he was surveying the Brandberg area. Maack was impressed by the main figure of the painting, which he described as "a warrior". In his notes, he wrote that "the Egyptian-Mediterranean style of all the figures is surprising". He made several hand-drawn copies of the painting, which were later published in Europe.

In 1929, Maack's notes came under the attention of the well-known French anthropologist Henri Breuil while he was visiting Cape Town. Breuil noted analogies between the White Lady and paintings of athletes found in Knossos (Crete), and suggested that the Brandberg might have been visited by a group of travelers coming from the Mediterranean area. He also said the painting had a Greek profile. After his multiple expeditions to the site, Breuil asserted a form of ownership over the white lady. It was Breuil who first referred to the painting as "the white lady". In 1945, Breuil could finally visit the White Lady site, and published his theories on the Mediterranean origin of the painting first in South Africa and then in Europe.

Breuil's arguments influenced several later hypotheses concerning the painting, some which suggested that it could be Phoenician in origin. Breuil's farfetched theory aligned with the racist policies of the South African government at that time, which downplayed any evidence that Black people could produce sophisticated works of art. The racist theories were used to disprove African origin of life and the San people being civilized. People tried to alienate the San people from their own ancestral rock art.

In the second half of the 20th century, most theories about Mediterranean influences on the ancient history of sub-Saharan Africa (like those about Great Zimbabwe being "non-African" in origin) were gradually dismissed.
