= Veld =

Type of rural landscape in Southern Africa

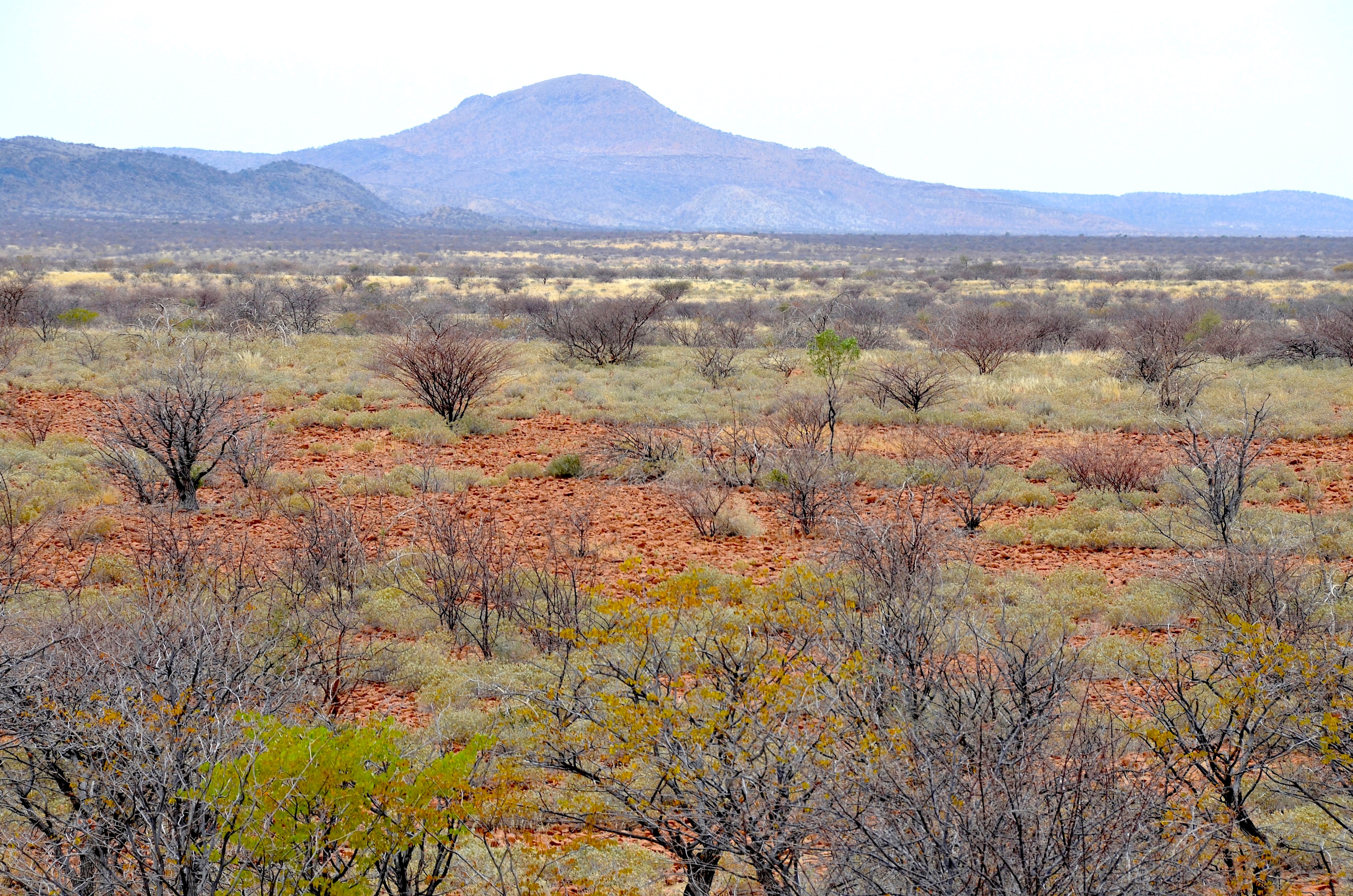
Typical veld near Petrified forest in Namibia

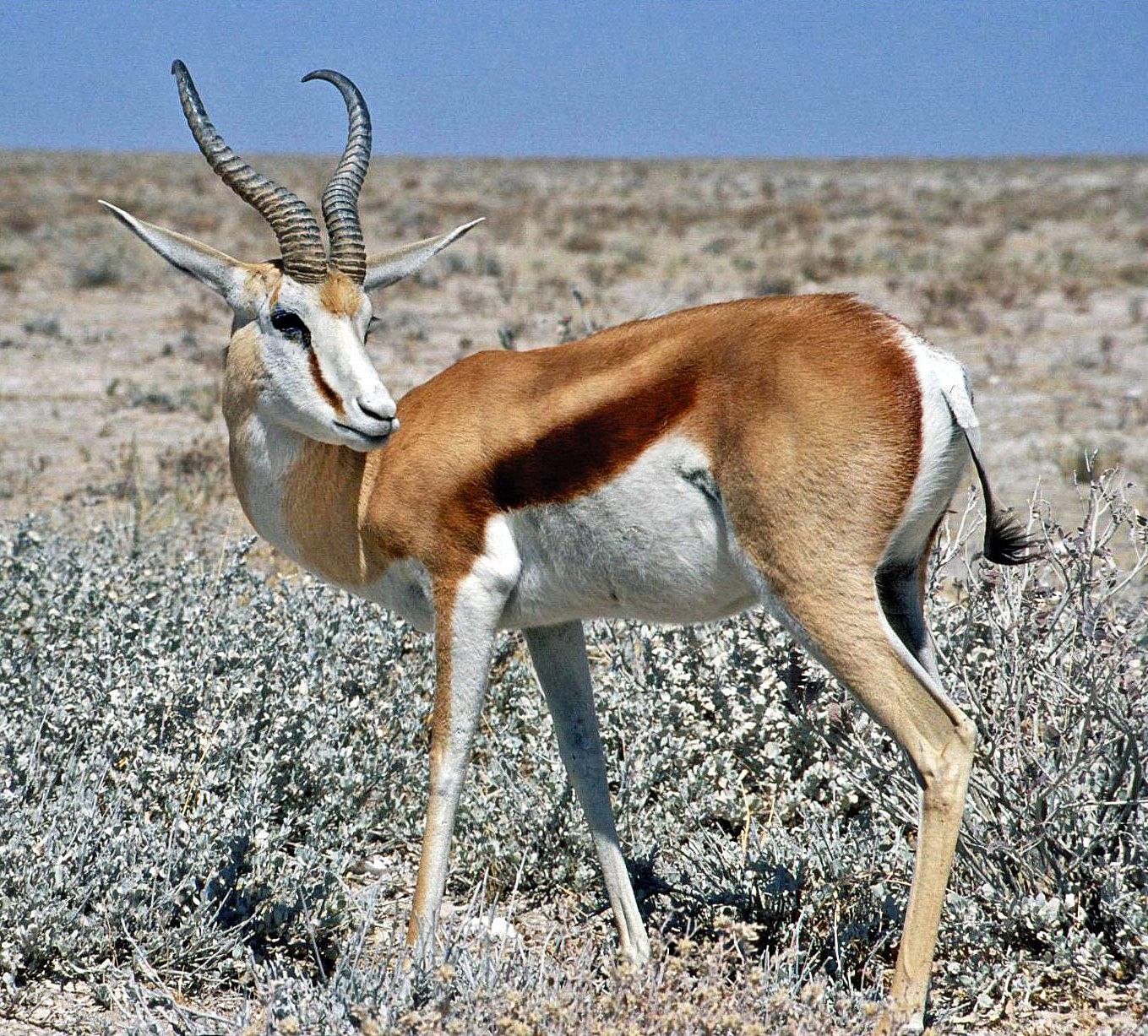
Springbok in growing veld; Etosha National Park, Namibia

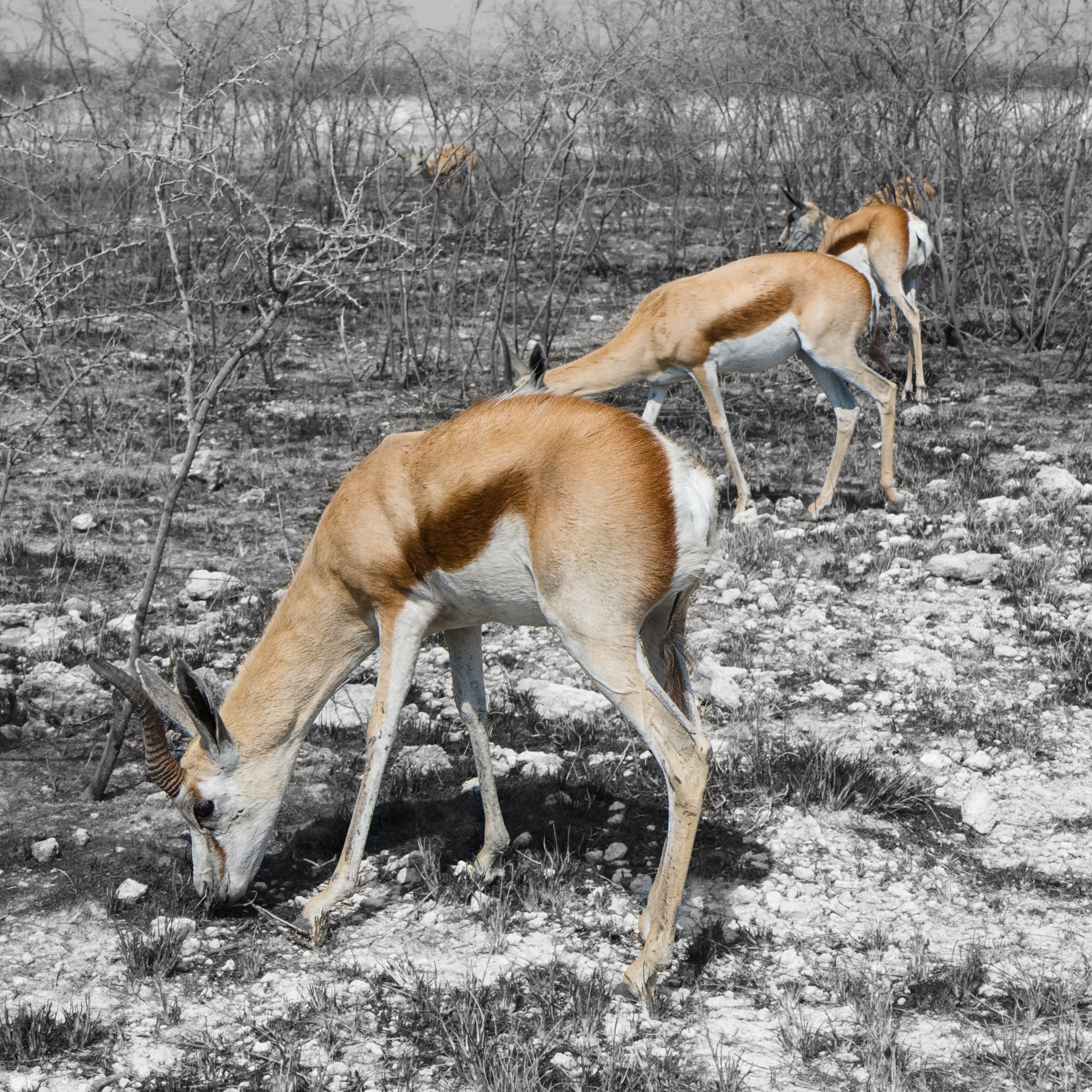
Springboks in the burned veld; Etosha National Park, Namibia

Veld (/vɛlt/ or /fɛlt/, Afrikaans and Dutch: veld, field), also spelled veldt, is a type of wide-open, rural landscape in Southern Africa. Particularly, it is a flat area covered in grass or low scrub, especially in the countries of South Africa, Namibia, Lesotho, Eswatini, Zimbabwe, and Botswana. A certain subtropical woodland ecoregion of Southern Africa has been officially defined as the Bushveld by the World Wide Fund for Nature. Trees are not abundant; frost, fire, and grazing animals allow grass to grow, but prevent the build-up of dense foliage.

== Etymology ==
The word veld (Afrikaans pronunciation: [fɛlt]) comes from the Afrikaans word for "field".

The etymological origin is older modern Dutch veldt, a spelling that the Dutch abandoned in favour of veld during the 19th century, decades before the first Afrikaans dictionary. A cognate to the English "field", it was spelt velt in Middle Dutch and felt in Old Dutch.

== Climate ==
The climate of the veld is highly variable, but its general pattern is mild winters from May to September and hot or very hot summers from November to March, with moderate or considerable variations in daily temperatures and abundant sunshine. Precipitation mostly occurs in the summers in the form of high-energy thunderstorms.

Over most of the South African Highveld, the average annual rainfall is between 500 and 900 millimetres (20 and 35 in) a year, decreasing to about 250 mm (9.8 in) near the western border and increasing to nearly 1,000 mm (39 in) in some parts of the Lesotho Highlands; the South African lowveld generally receives more precipitation than the highveld. Temperature is closely related to elevation. In general, the mean July (winter) temperatures range between 7 °C (45 °F) in the Lesotho highlands and 16 °C (61 °F) in the lowveld. January (summer) temperatures range between 18 and 30 °C (64 and 86 °F).

In Zimbabwe, precipitation averages around 750–900 mm (30–35 in) on the highveld, dropping to less than 350 millimetres (14 in) in the lowest areas of the Lowveld. Temperatures are slightly higher than in South Africa.

Over the entire veld, seasonal and annual average rainfall variations of up to 40% are common. Damaging drought affects at least half the area about once every three or four years; it reduces plant and animal biomass to sustainable levels again. Everywhere, the average number of hours of annual sunshine varies from 60 to 80% of the total amount possible.

== Definitions ==
=== Highveld and lowveld ===
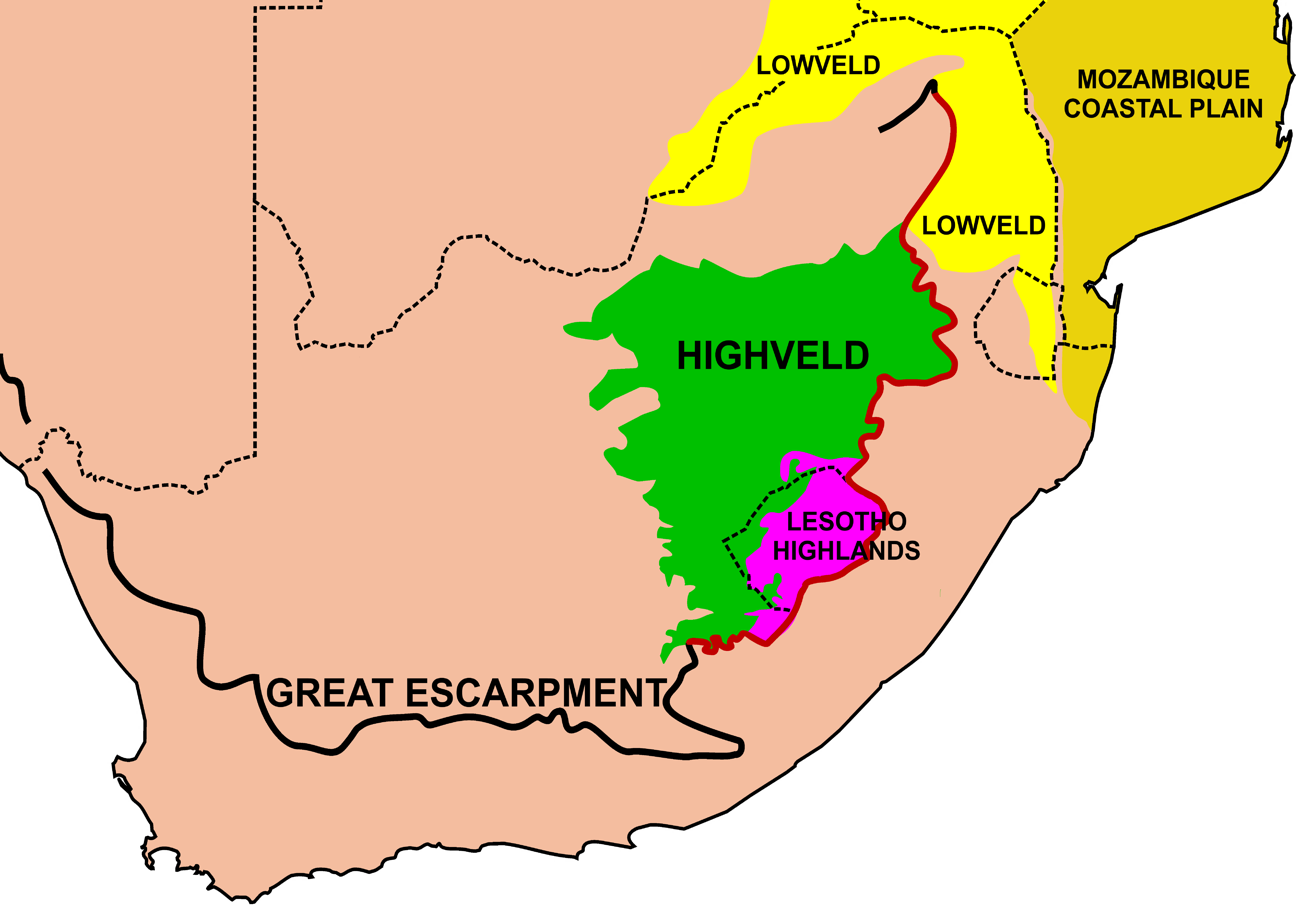
A map of South Africa showing the Great Escarpment and its relation to the highveld, lowveld and Lesotho highlands Drakensberg escarpment remainder of Great Escarpment

The portion of the Great Escarpment that is colored red is the Drakensberg.

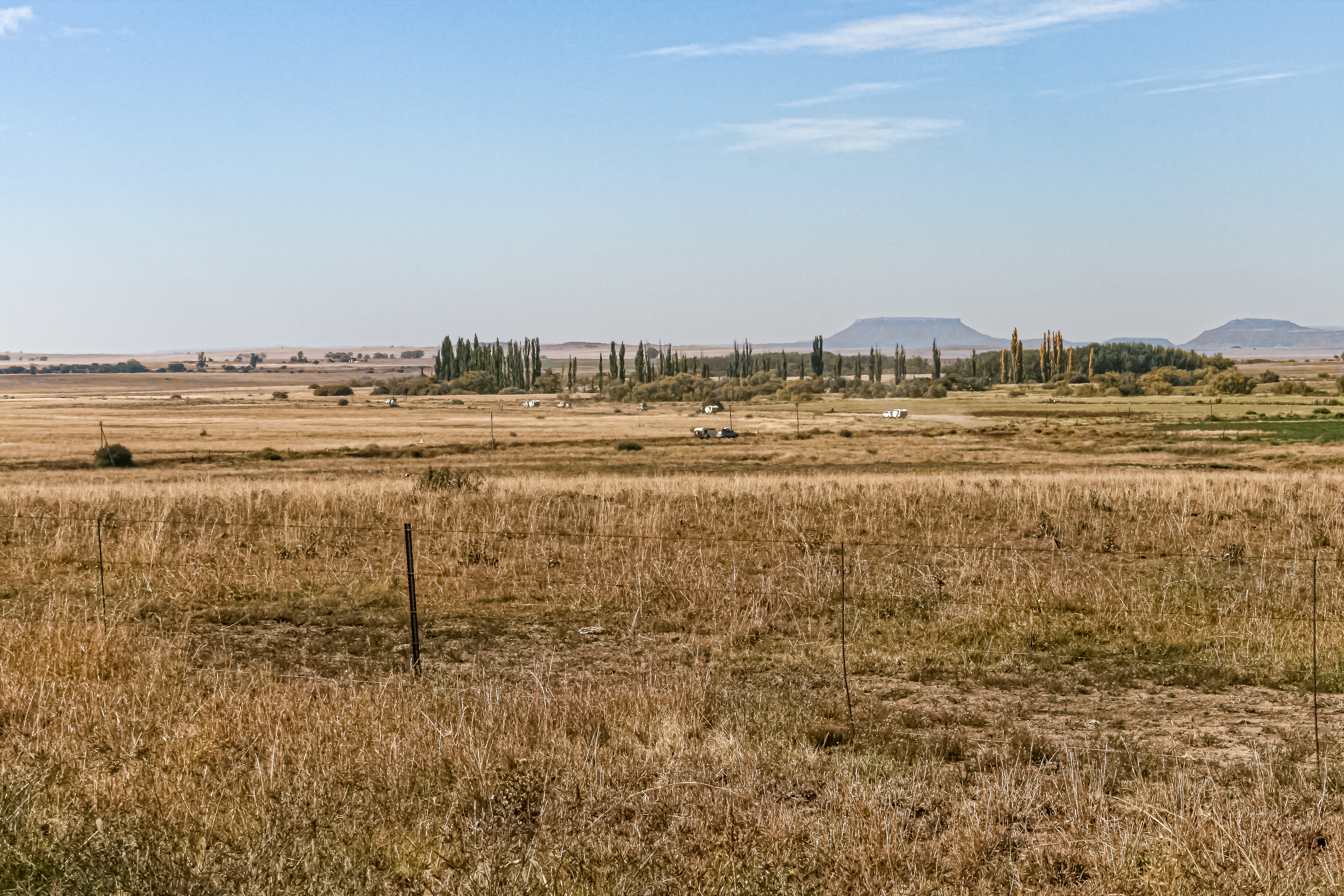
Highveld at Excelsior in the central Free State

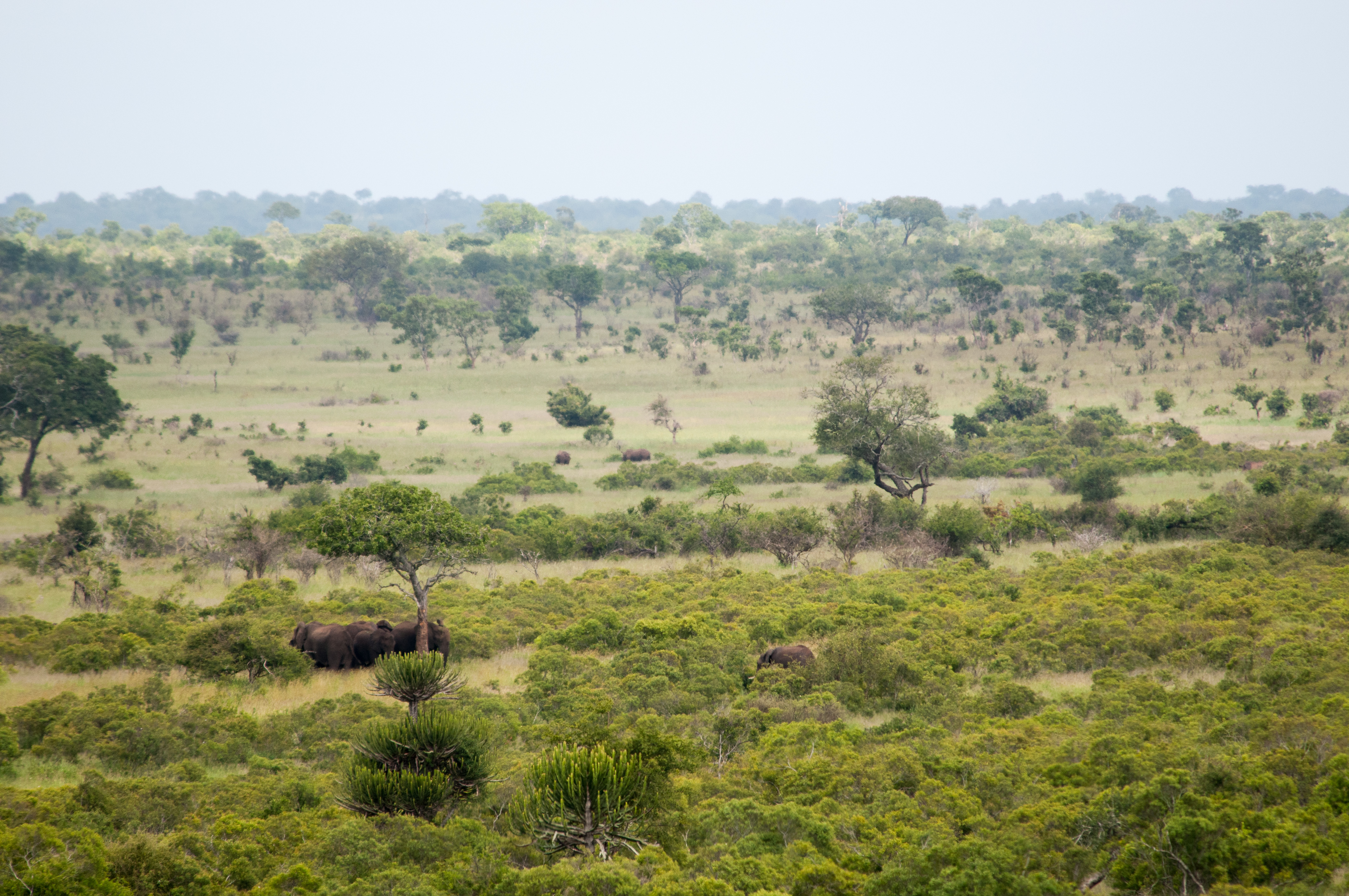
The Mpumalanga lowveld, as seen near Muntshe Hill in the Kruger Park

==== Highveld ====
Much of the interior of Southern Africa consists of a high plateau, the higher portions 1,500–2,100 m (4,900–6,900 ft) of which are known as the highveld, starting at the Drakensberg escarpment, 220 km (140 miles) to the east of Johannesburg and sloping gradually downwards to the west and southwest, as well as to the north, through the bushveld towards the Limpopo River. These higher, cooler areas (generally more than 1,500 m or 4,900 ft above sea level) are characterised by flat or gently undulating terrain, vast grasslands, and a modified tropical or subtropical climate. To the east, the highveld's border is marked by the Great Escarpment, or the Mpumalanga Drakensberg. Still, the boundary is often arbitrary and not apparent in the other directions. The blesbok and quagga were among the large animals that once roamed on the highveld in great numbers. Nowadays, a sizeable population of springbok still occurs in some areas. Much of the area, though, is devoted to commercial farming and South Africa's largest conurbation (Gauteng province).

==== Lowveld ====
The lowlands, below about 500 m (1,640 ft) altitude, along South Africa's northern border with Botswana and Zimbabwe, where a 180-million-year-old failed rift valley cuts into Southern Africa's central plateau and locally obliterates the Great Escarpment, is known as the lowveld. The Limpopo and Save Rivers run from the central African highlands via the lowveld into the Indian Ocean to the east. The Limpopo lowveld extends southwards, east of the Drakensberg Escarpment through Mpumalanga province and ultimately into eastern Eswatini. This southern limb of the lowveld is bounded by South Africa's border with Mozambique to the east and the northeastern part of Drakensberg to the west. This region is generally hotter and less intensely cultivated than the highveld. Until the mid-20th century, the lowveld was still infested by the tsetse fly, which transmits the sleeping sickness called nagana among the Zulus.

=== Thornveld ===
Thornveld (also thorn veld or thornveldt), often referred to as "acacia thornveld", is a type of semiarid savanna in which grassland with thorny Acacia and certain species of thorny bushes predominate. The predominant plant species are usually different in the thornveld of the plains or in the hill thornveld, where, for example, species of genus Balanites are common. Some of the characteristic species in the thornveld include:

- Grasses: Grass species belonging to genera Themeda and Hyparrhenia
- Trees and bushes: Genera Acacia and Rhus, such as Acacia afra, Acacia sieberiana, and Rhus pentheri, and other species such as Ziziphus mucronata, Ehretia rigida, and Cussonia spicata.

=== Sandveld and hardveld ===
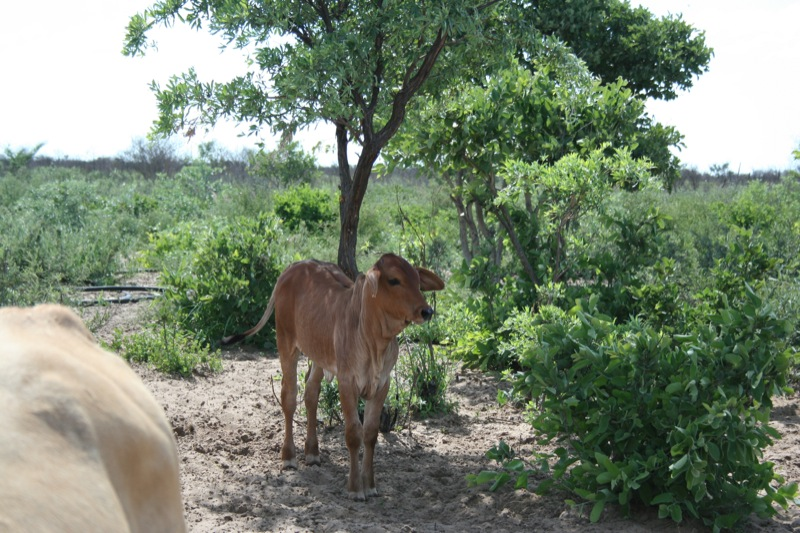
A calf in the sandveld in Botswana

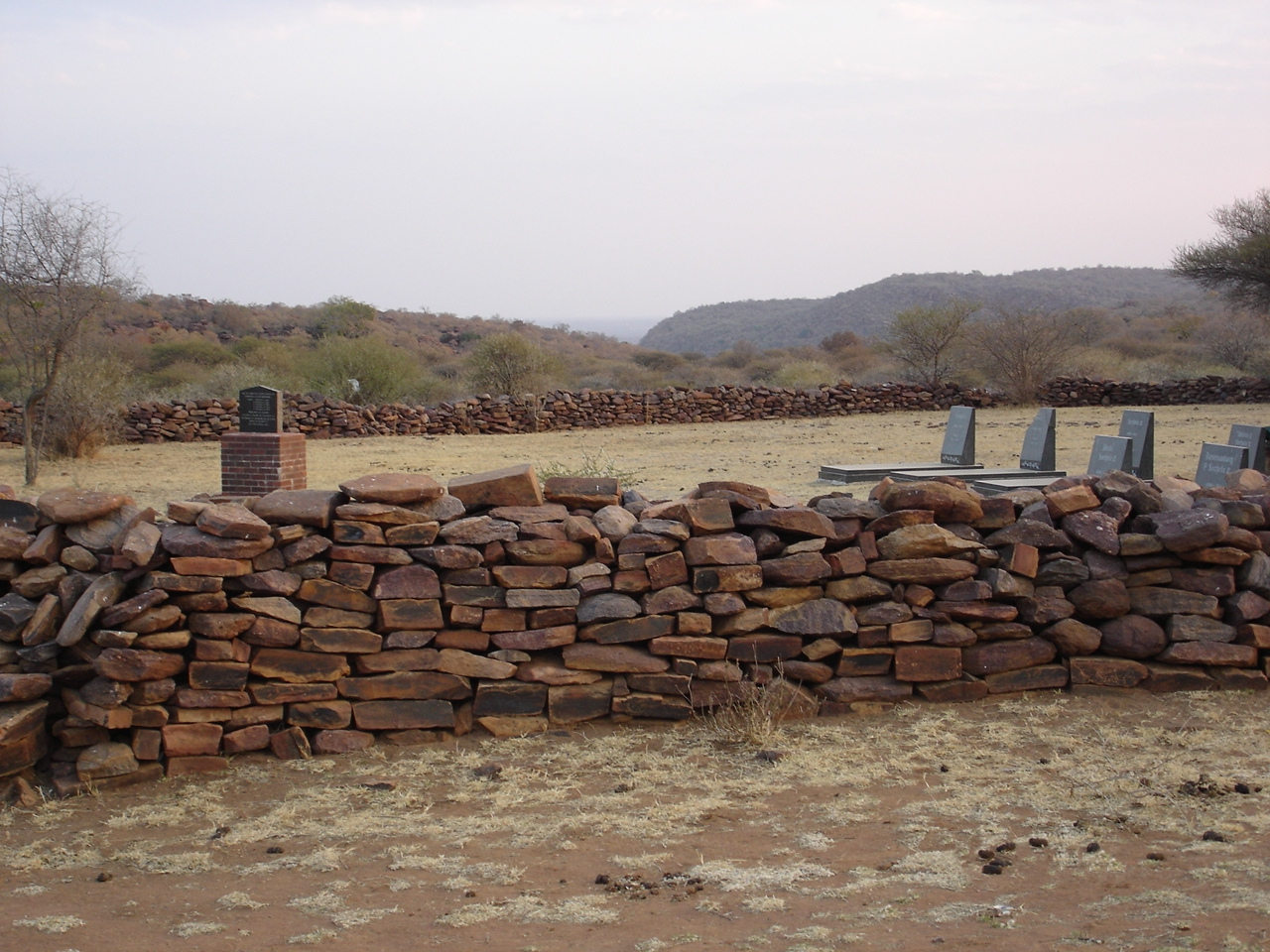
Bakwena Royal Cemetery, Molepolole, in the hardveld area of southeast Botswana

==== Sandveld ====
Sandveld, in the general sense of the word, is a type of veld characterised by dry, sandy soil, typical of certain areas of the Southern African region. It usually absorbs all water from the seasonal rains, although aquatic habitats, largely seasonal, may be also found in specific places in the sandveld. Only certain hardy plant species thrive in the sandveld environment. These consist especially of grasses forming clumps and certain kinds of trees and shrubs. The sandveld vegetation has a particular pattern of growth, rarely covering the whole terrain, thus leaving patches of sandy soil exposed on the surface. Some of the typical sandveld species are Acacia haematoxylon, A. luederitzii, Boscia albitrunca, Terminalia sericea, Lonchocarpus nelsii, Bauhinia petersiana, and Baphia massaiensis.

==== Hardveld ====
Hardveld is a term applied to certain rocky soil areas in Botswana, mostly in the eastern part of the country. The landscape is an undulating plain with scattered rocky hill ranges. Areas of hardveld also occur in South Africa in the mountainous central Kamiesberg of the Northern Cape with hilly escarpments and deep river valleys. The soil of the hardveld is characterised by rocky outcrops and an abundance of stones and pebbles of different shapes and sizes.

The flora of the hardveld is typical of rocky savanna, with denser vegetation, so fewer denuded patches than in the sandveld, as well as taller trees. Also, a higher diversity of species is seen in the hardveld compared with the sandveld. Peltophorum africanum, Acacia nigrescens, A. tortilis, Combretum apiculatum, and Colophospermum mopane are some of the representative species of the northern hardveld.

== See also ==
- Bushveld
- Highveld
- Kruger National Park
- Lowveld
- Outback
- Pasture
- Plain
- Prairie
- Rangeland
