= Organ Pipes =

Organ Pipes or The Organ Pipes may refer to:

- Organ pipes, the sound-producing element of the pipe organ
- Organ Pipes (New Zealand), a feature of Mount Cargill, in the South Island
- Organ Pipes (Namibia), a rock formation
- Organ Pipes National Park, in Victoria, Australia
- Organ Pipe Cactus National Monument, in Arizona, United States
- The Organ Pipes (Antarctica), a rock formation in Queen Elizabeth Land

== See also ==
- Organ pipe coral (Tubipora musica)
- Stenocereus thurberi, organ pipe cactus
