= Khorixas =

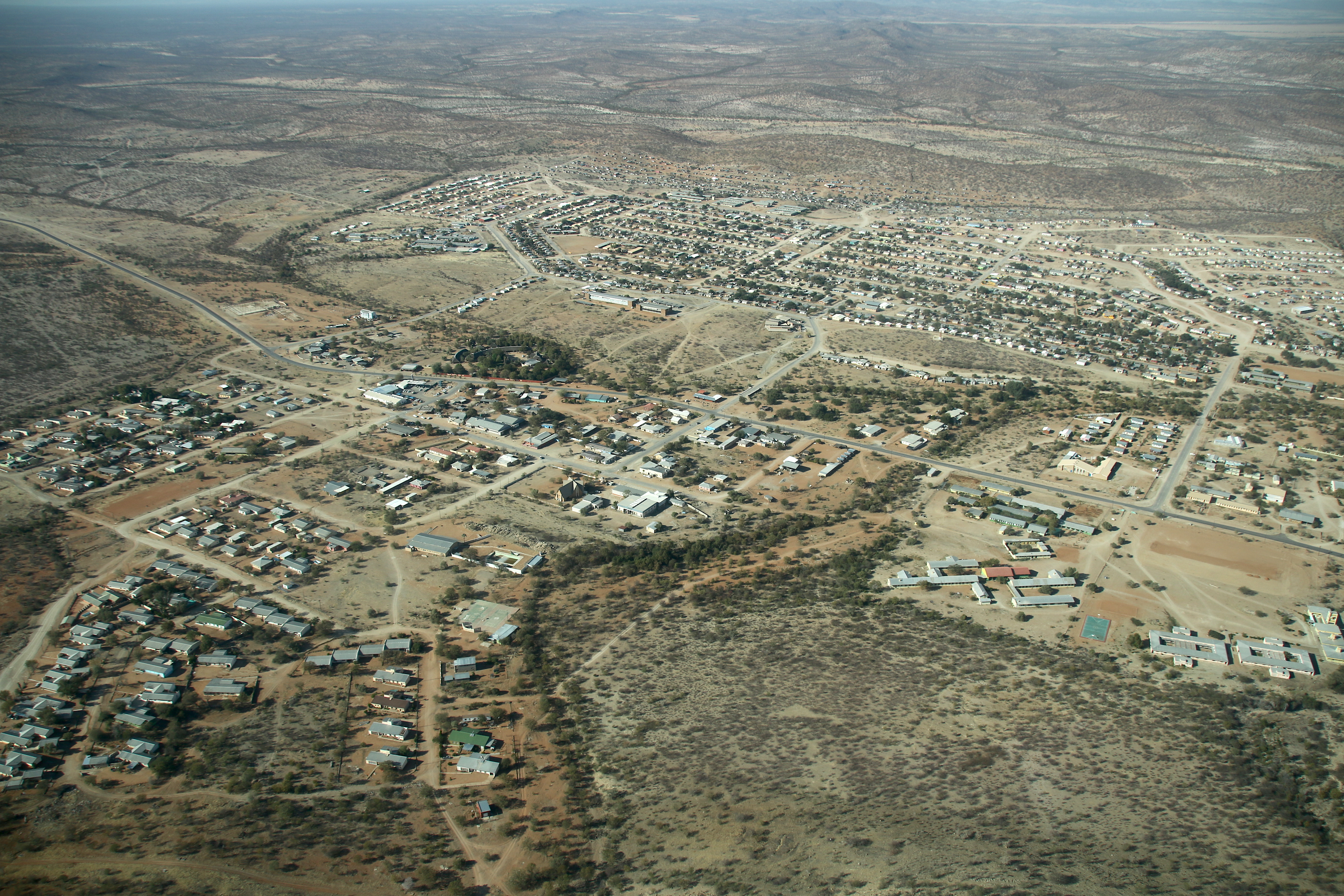
- Aerial view of Khorixas (2018)

- Location in Namibia
- Coordinates: 20°22′S 14°58′E
- Country: Namibia
- Region: Kunene Region
- Constituency: Khorixas Constituency

Government
  - Mayor: Cloephas Tjunduwa
  - Town Council CEO: Lina ǂGaeses

Population (2023 census)
  - Total: 9,371
- Time zone: UTC+2 (CAT)
- Climate: BSh

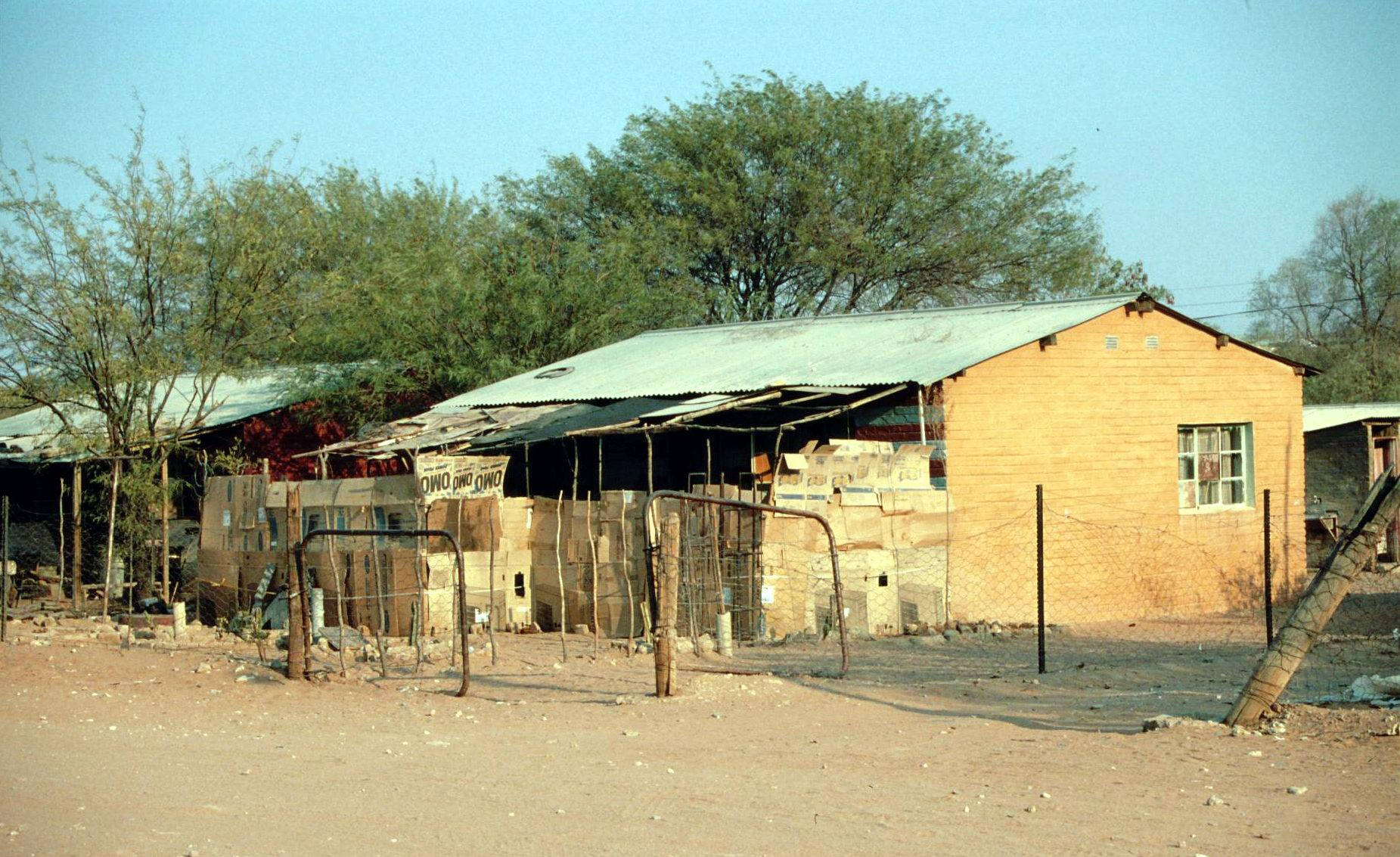
Housing in Khorixas

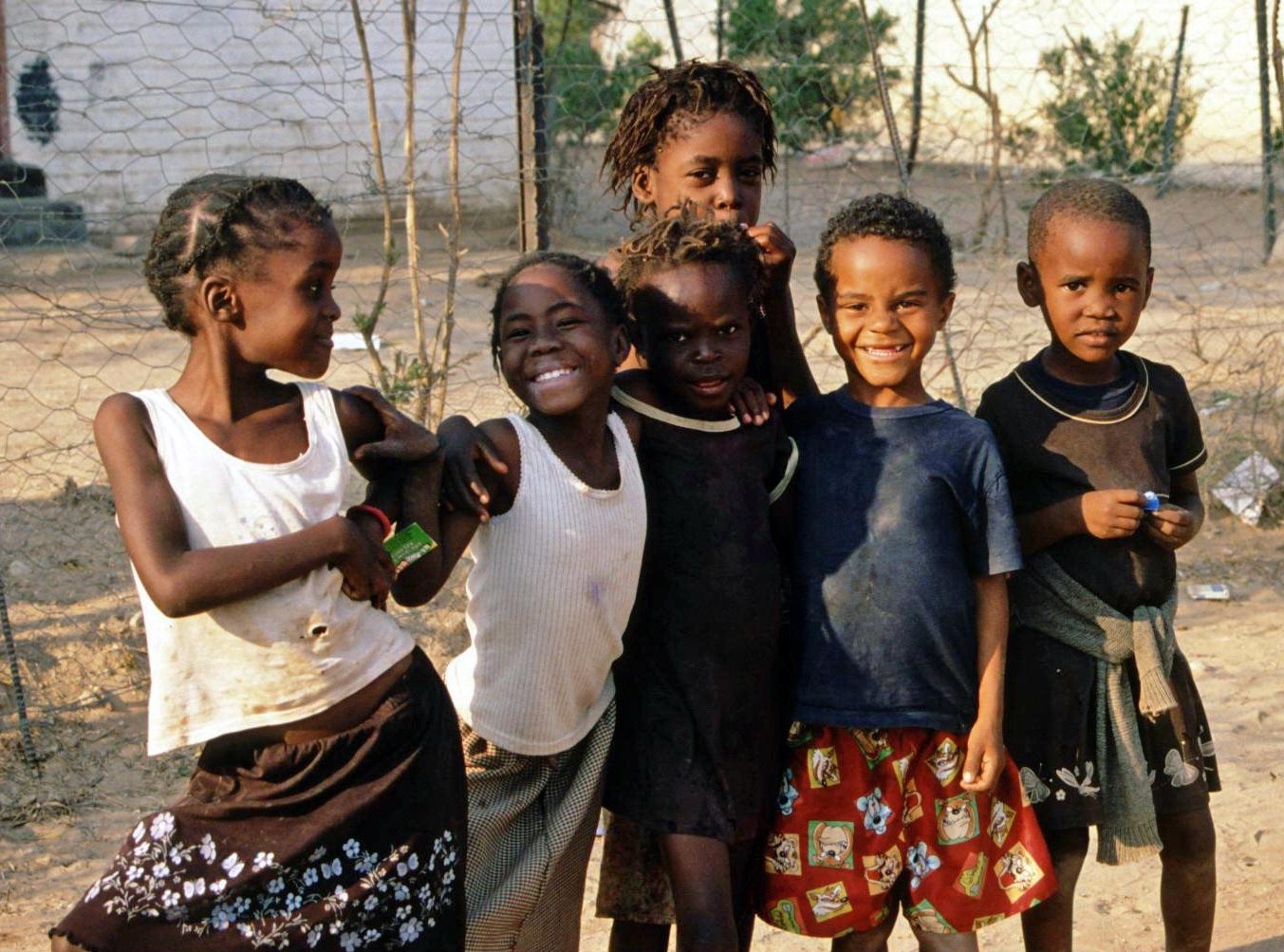
Children in Khorixas

Khorixas is a town with about 9,000 inhabitants in the southern part of the Kunene Region, Namibia. It was the capital of the Damaraland bantustan before Namibia's independence. It is the administrative capital of Khorixas Constituency. Most of the inhabitants are from the Damara ethnic group. The town is located near the Petrified Forest, a deposit of petrified wood and well-known tourist attraction of Namibia. The Twyfelfontein valley, known for its rock art, is also accessible from Khorixas.

== Economy and infrastructure ==
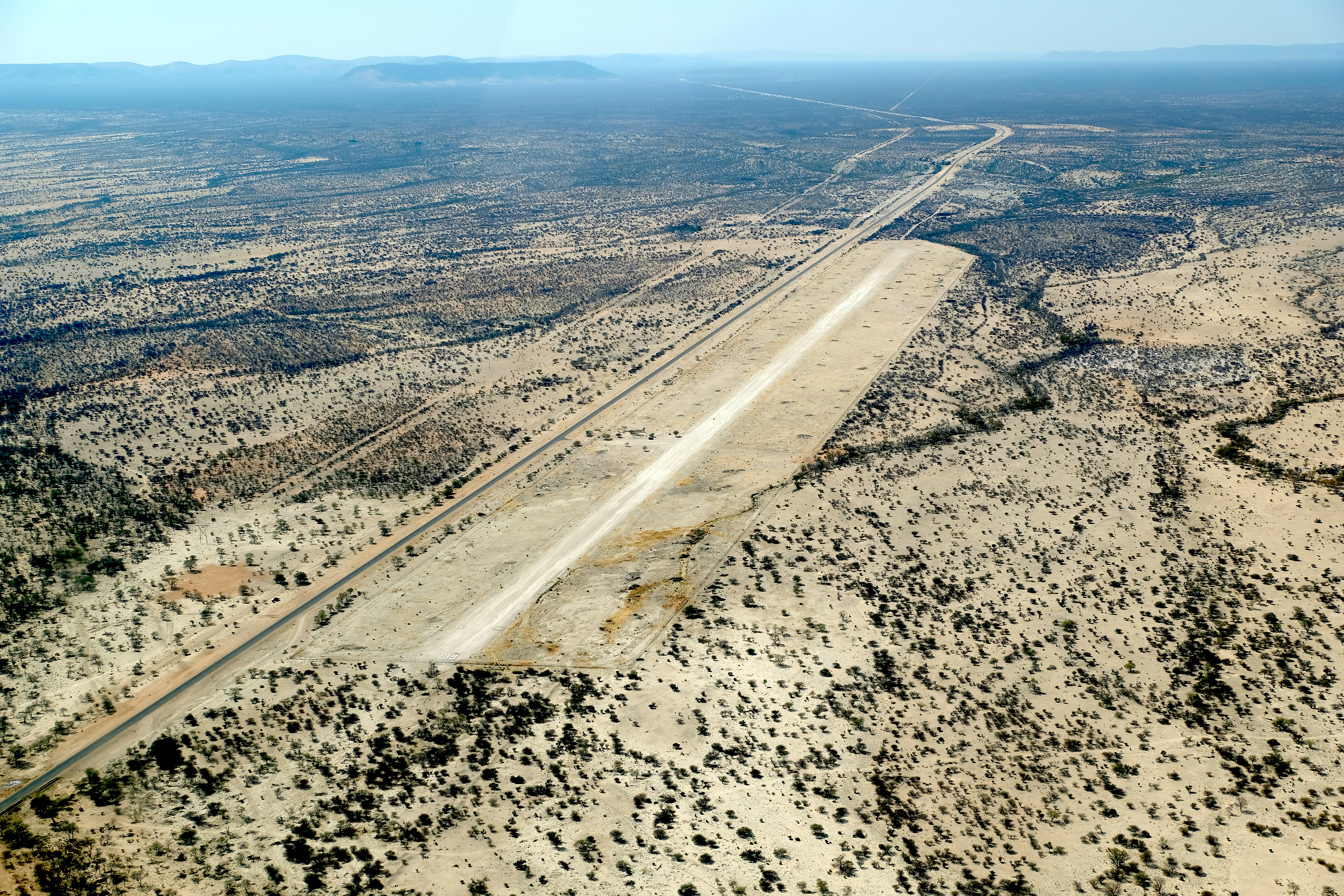
Khorixas landing strip and main road C39 (2018)

Khorixas suffers from a lack of economic development and employment opportunities, which leads to frustration and outward migration among many of the town's youth. The unemployment rate in town is estimated to be around 70%. Donkerhoek (Afrikaans: dark corner), the town's informal settlement, has neither water nor electricity.

The regional hospital and some other regional offices are located in Khorixas, though the capital of the Kunene Region is Opuwo. Khorixas has a landing strip nine kilometers east of town parallel to the C39 main road. The Runway Numbers are 09/27 and elevation is 3320 feet.

There are six schools and one branch of the University of Namibia (UNAM) in Khorixas, Versteendewoud is the biggest primary school and Cornelius Goreseb High School is the biggest secondary school. Other schools are Eddie Bowe Primary School, Welwitchia Primary School, Welwitchia Junior Secondary School and Th. F. ǃGaeb Primary School.

Historical population
Year	Pop.	±% p.a.
2001	5,890	—
2011	6,796	+1.44%
2023	9,371	+2.71%

== Politics ==
Khorixas is governed by a town council that has seven seats. Due to its location in former Damaraland, the ethnically Damara-based United Democratic Front (UDF) has strong support in the population. Unlike in most other constituencies of Namibia, the ruling SWAPO party had until 2015 never won in Khorixas.

=== Local authority elections ===
The first local election run after Namibian independence, the 1992 local elections, was won by the UDF which obtained 1,392 votes and gained four seats. SWAPO came second with 547 votes and two seats. The remaining seat went to the Democratic Turnhalle Alliance (DTA) with 349 votes. The 1998 local authority elections saw a similar result. UDF won and gained three seats (796 votes), SWAPO came second with also three seats (406 votes). One seat went to the DTA (187 votes).

The 2015 local authority election was won by SWAPO, gaining four seats (1,741 votes) and the majority in the village council. The remaining three seats went to the UDF with 1,345 votes. The 2020 local authority election was won by the UDF which gained 985 votes and four seats. SWAPO was runner up with 624 votes and two seats. The remaining seat went to the Landless People's Movement (LPM, a new party registered in 2018, 261 votes).

=== Mayors ===
- 1992-2002 Chief Gottfried Arusen Uiseb, UDF. First Mayor of Khorixas until his death in 2002.
- 2005 Martha Claassen, UDF. Claassen was the first female mayor of Khorixas, but her reign lasted only three days.
- 2012–2015 Trypohasa Moloto, UDF.
- 2015–2020: Elizabeth Geises, SWAPO

== Geography ==
=== Climate ===
Khorixas has a semi-arid climate (BSh, according to the Köppen climate classification), with warm to hot summers and mild winters. It borders on a desert climate (BWh). The average annual precipitation is 220 mm (9 in), with a low of 106 mm (4.2 in) during the 2010s drought in 2018/19.

Khorixas

Climate chart (precipitation, max. and min. temperature)
J	F	M	A	M	J	J	A	S	O	N	D
45 29 17	64 27 17	67 27 16	22 26 14	4 24 11	0 23 9	0 22 8	0 24 9	1 26 11	6 28 13	14 28 15	10 29 16
- █ Average max. and min. temperatures in °C
- █ Precipitation totals in mm
- Source: World Climate Guide
Imperial conversion
J	F	M	A	M	J	J	A	S	O	N	D
1.8 84 63	2.5 81 63	2.6 81 61	0.9 79 57	0.2 75 52	0 73 48	0 72 46	0 75 48	0 79 52	0.2 82 55	0.6 82 59	0.4 84 61
- █ Average max. and min. temperatures in °F
- █ Precipitation totals in inches

== Sport ==
The Robber Chanties, which in August 2010 played in the Northern Stream Division One and sought promotion the Namibia Premier League, are based in Khorixas.

== Sights ==
- Organ Pipes
- Burnt Mountain
