= Burnt Mountain (Namibia) =

Mountain in Namibia

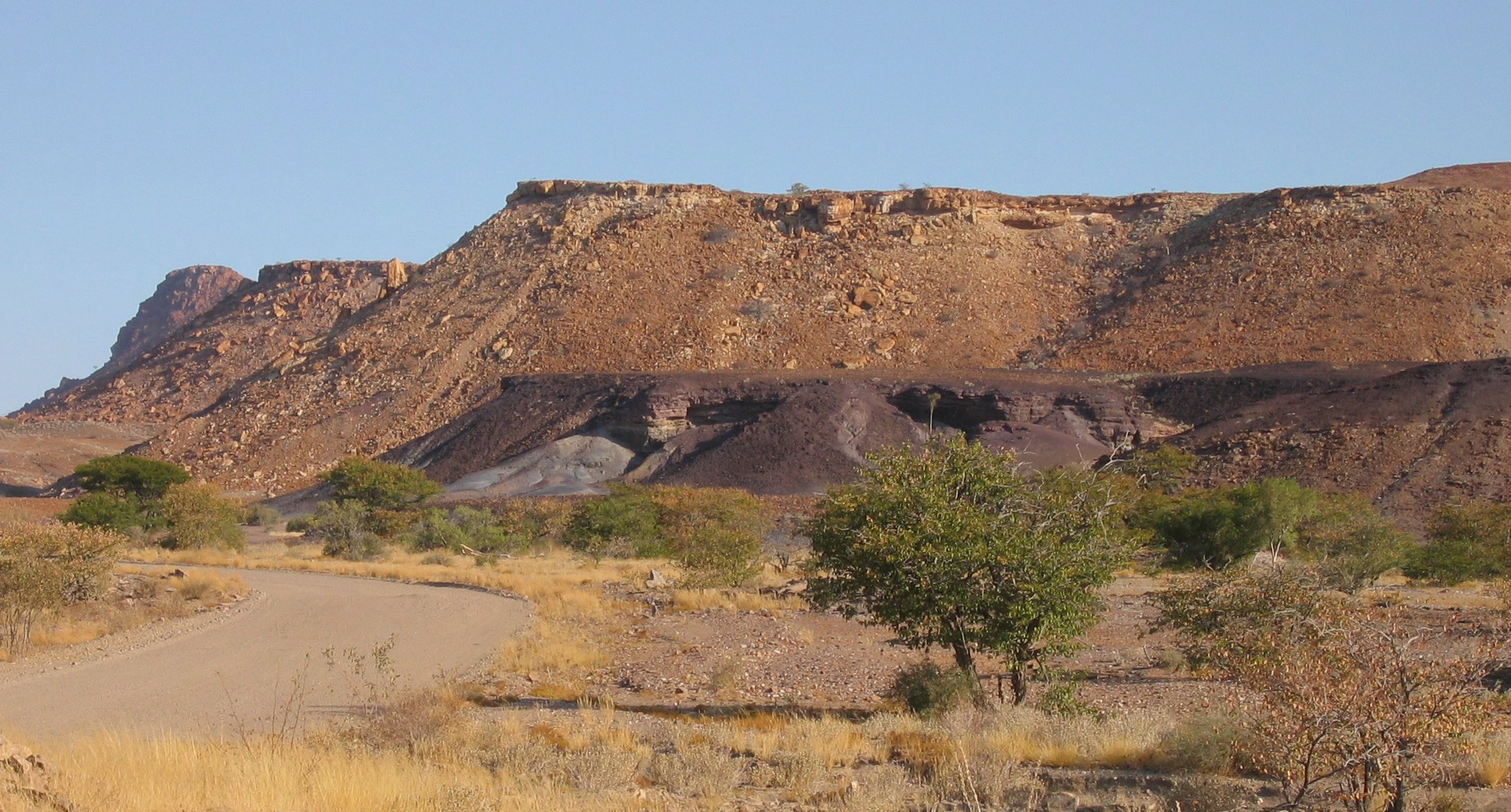

Highest point
- Coordinates: 20°37′18″S 14°25′06″E

Geography
- Location within Namibia
- Location: Namibia

Geology
- Rock age: 80 million years

The Burnt Mountain (Afrikaans: Verbrandeberg, German: Verbrannter Berg) is a hill with a solidified lava flow at the foot of a 12-kilometre-long volcanic ridge in Damaraland in northern Namibia. The 80-million-year-old stream of lava was formed by thermal and compression metamorphism and its red, brown, cream and purple colours creates a striking contrast at dusk with the surrounding 200-million-year-old beige rocks of Karoo slate.

Burnt Mountain rises above the surrounding area by about 200 metres and is not far from the Organ Pipes on the D3254 road and about 10 kilometres southeast of Twyfelfontein.

Since 15 September 1956, the Burnt Mountain has been a National Monument of Namibia.
