= Reinhard Maack =

German explorer, geologist and geographer

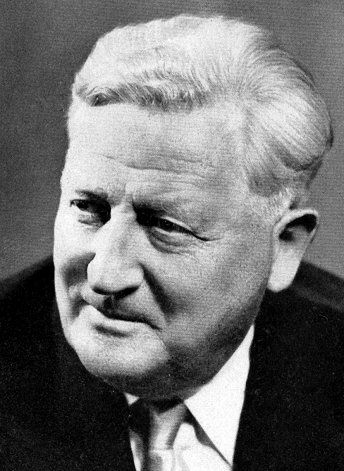
Reinhard Maack

Reinhard Maack (2 October 1892 – 26 August 1969) was a German explorer, geologist, and geographer.

Maack was born in Herford. While he was working as a surveyor and the headmaster of Windhoek school in central Namibia, he discovered 'The White Lady' rock painting in 1918. Maack was at the time convinced that the art had a distinct European style, and this view was upheld by various prominent archaeologists of the day.

'The White Lady' has been controversially dated from 6,000 to 20,000 years old. It was discovered in Namibia and was supposedly of European (or as was more specifically speculated, Mediterranean) origin. The controversial date meant that the whole theory of the "cradle of civilization" being in east or central Africa was thrown into chaos.

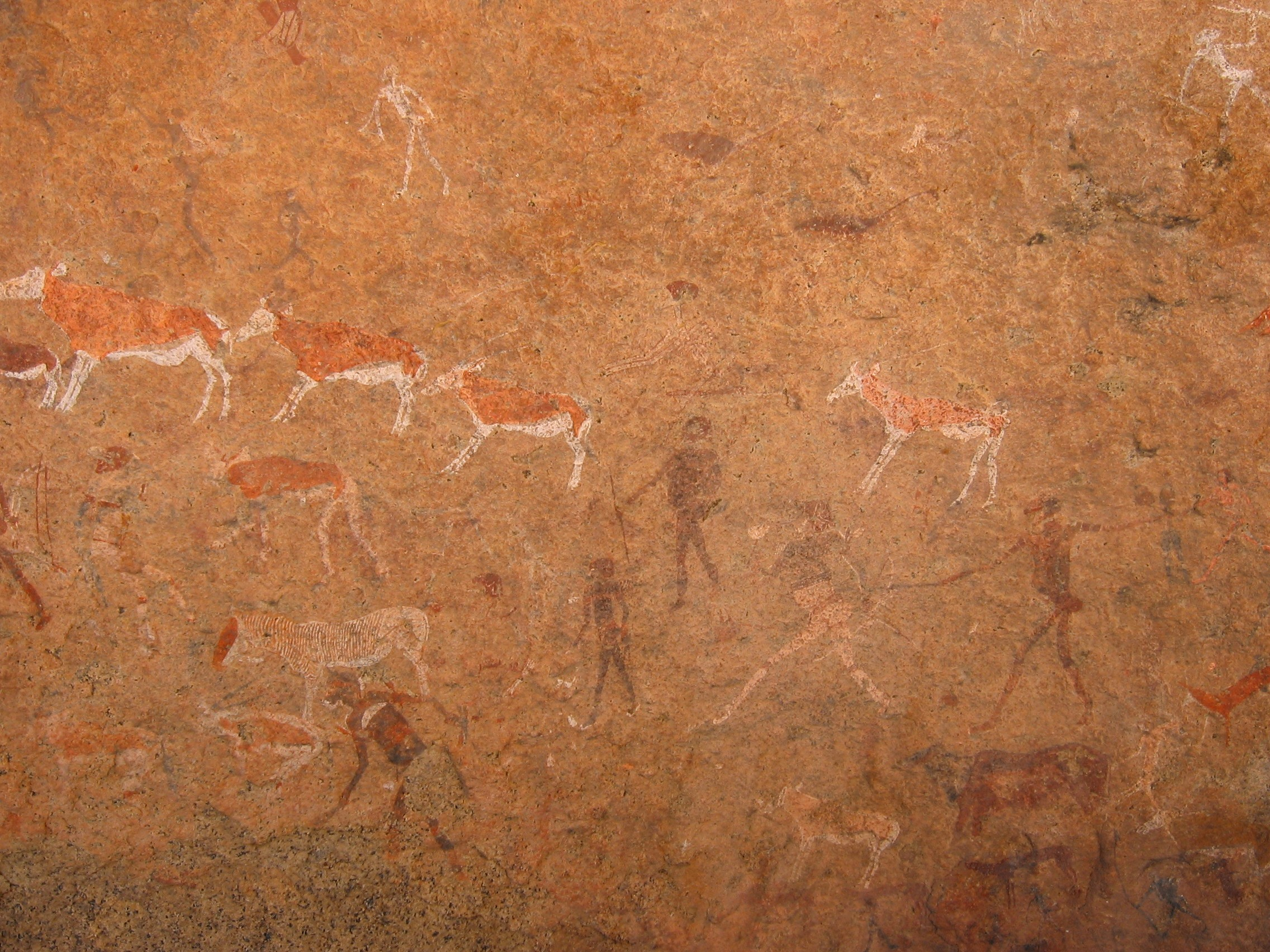
White Lady rock painting, Brandberg, Namibia, discovered by Maack in 1918.

Maack died in Curitiba, Brazil, aged 76.

== Honors ==
- In May 1959, Maack attended the commemoration ceremony for the 100th anniversary of the death of Alexander von Humboldt in Berlin; he received the Carl Ritter Medal.
- On 1 July 1969, he was awarded the Order of Merit of the Federal Republic of Germany.
