= Petrified forest, Khorixas =

Nambian national forest

Coordinates: 20.4385°S 14.6064°E

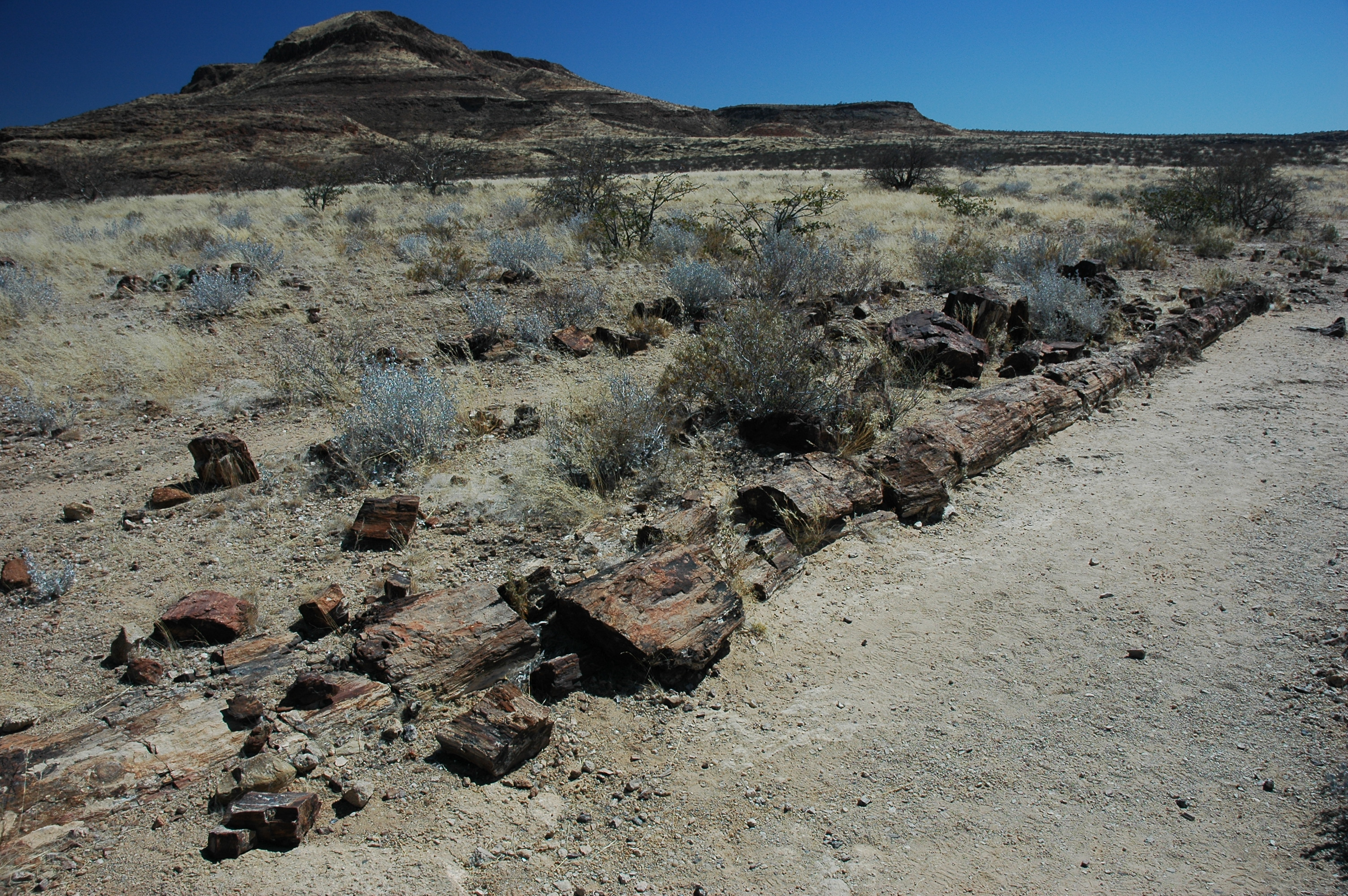
Large petrified tree trunk

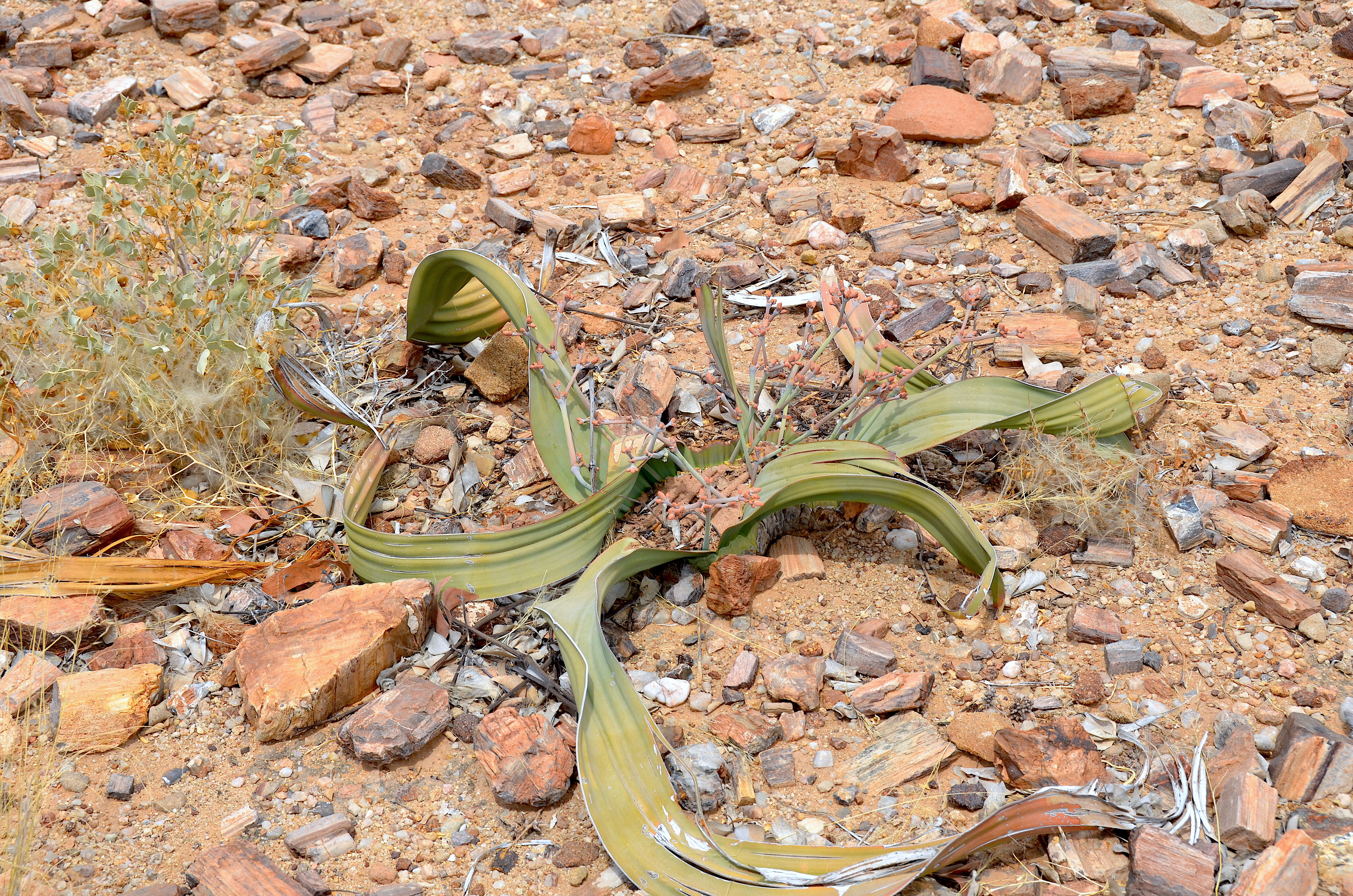
Pieces of petrified wood next to a Welwitschia in Namibia

The Petrified forest, located 42 kilometres (26 mi) west of the Namibian town of Khorixas, on the C39 road, is a deposit of large tree trunks that have "turned to stone" through a process of diagenesis. There are at least two large tree trunks, each 45 metres (148 ft) long, exposed to view. Several hundred others are located in the vicinity.

It is believed that the trees were swept downstream by a large flood and covered by alluvial sands. Deprived of air, the organic matter could not rot and decay, but instead, over millions of years, underwent silicification, whereby each cell is individually fossilised, and the appearance, if not the colour, of wood is retained. The surrounding sands became sandstone, which is now eroding away.

In addition, there are a large number of welwitschia plants at the site.

The site was declared a National Monument on 1 March 1950.
