= Organ Pipes (Namibia) =

Rock formation in Namibia

Coordinates: 20°36′48″S 14°24′57″E

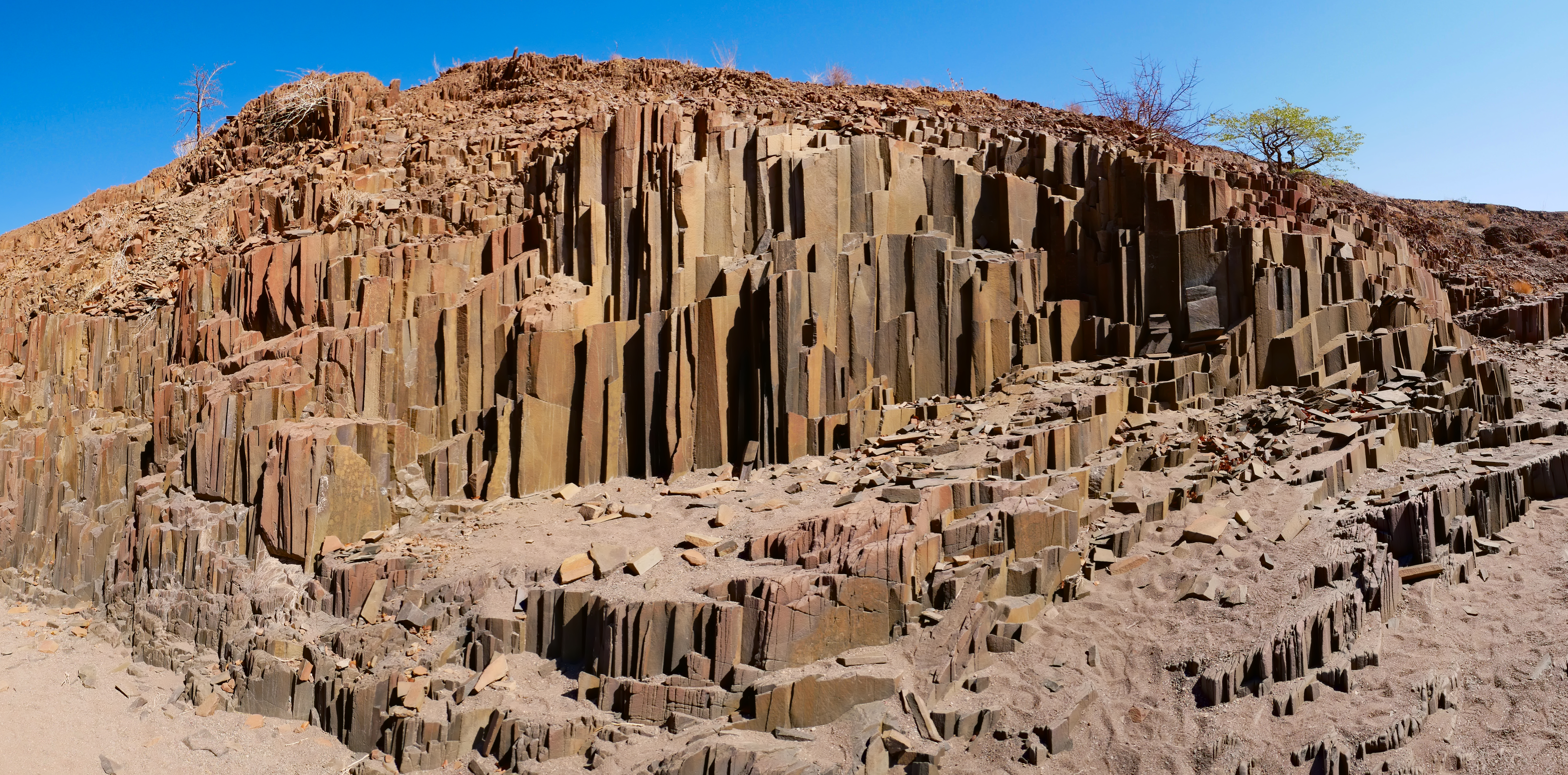
The Organ Pipes near Khorixas

The Organ Pipes (Afrikaans: Orrelpype, German: Orgelpfeifen) are situated near the small inselberg of the Burnt Mountain, west of the town of Khorixas in Namibia. They are part of a rock formation that comprises a group of columnar basalts which resemble organ pipes.

The Organ Pipes were formed about 150 million years ago as the result of the intrusion of liquid lava into a slate rock formation, which was exposed over time by erosion. The Organ Pipes are a well-known landmark and popular tourist attraction in the Kunene Region.
