= Damaraland =

Bantustan in South West Africa (1980–1989)

Coordinates: 22.25°S 15.19°E

- 1980–1989
- Flag

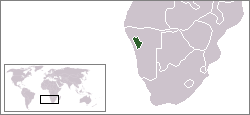
- Location of Damaraland (green) within South West Africa (grey)

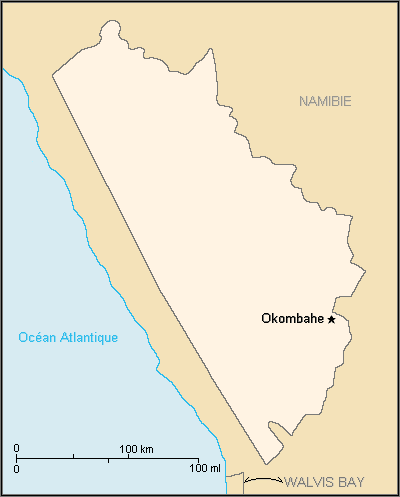
- Map of the Bantustan
- Status: Bantustan; Second-tier authority (1980–1989)
- Capital: Khorixas
- Common languages: Khoekhoe; Herero; English; Afrikaans; German
- History
  - Self-government: 1980
  - Re-integrated into Namibia: May 1989
- Currency: South African rand
| Preceded by | Succeeded by |
| South West Africa | Namibia |

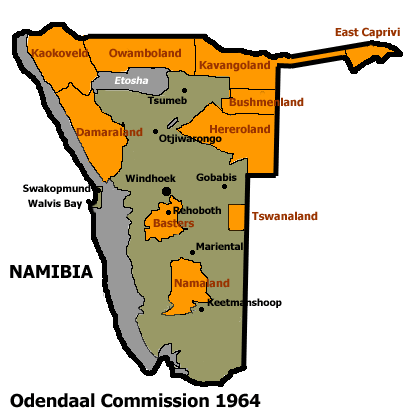
Allocation of land to Bantustans according to the Odendaal Plan. Damaraland is central west.

Damaraland was a name given to the north-central part of South West Africa, which later became Namibia, inhabited by the Damaras. It was bordered roughly by Ovamboland in the north, the Namib Desert in the west, the Kalahari Desert in the east, and the Windhoek region in the south.

== Administrative history ==
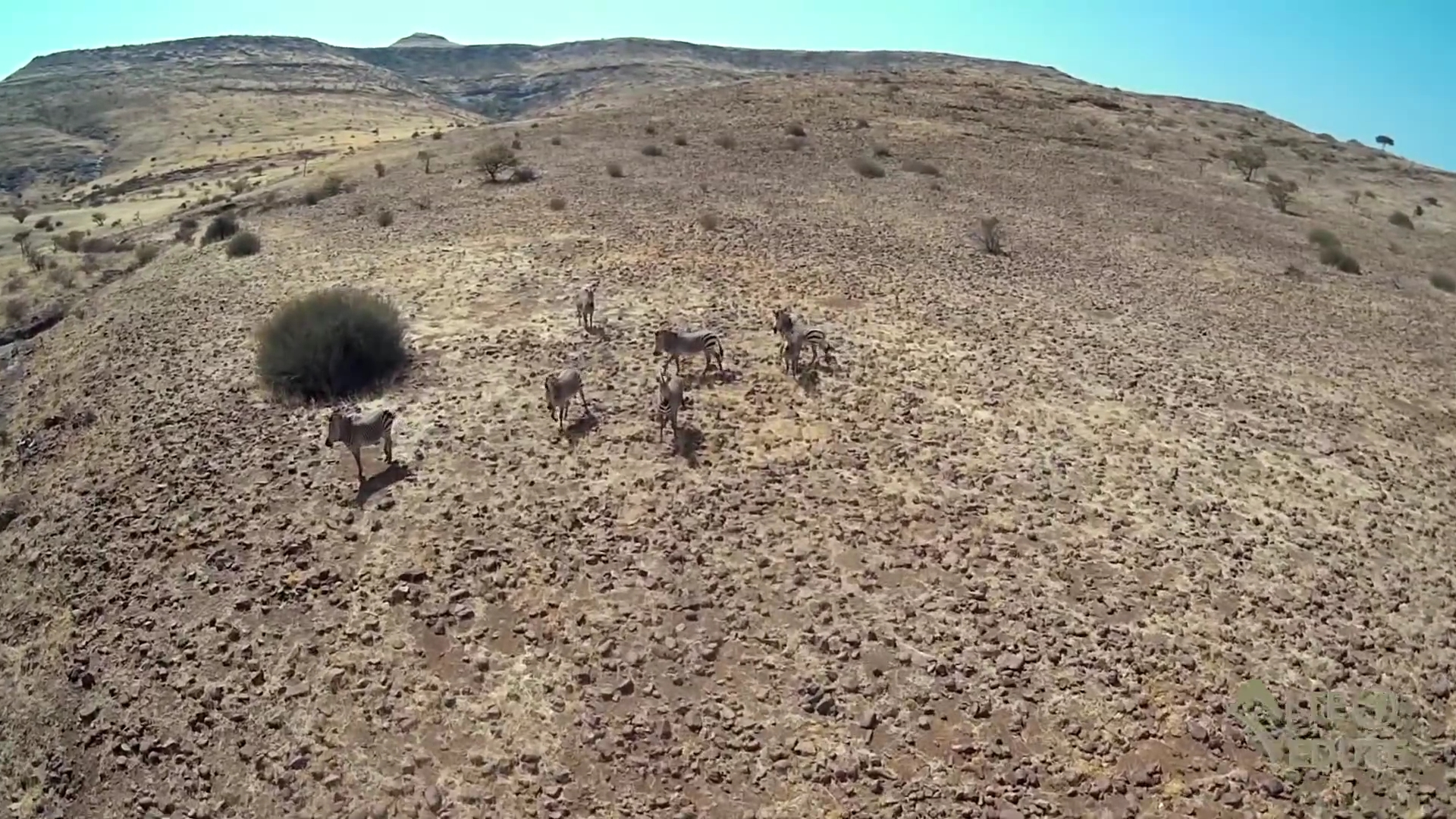
Rugged landscape of Damaraland

=== Bantustan ===
In the 1970s, the name Damaraland was chosen for a Bantustan, intended by the apartheid-era government to be a self-governing homeland for the Damara people. The Bantustan Damaraland was situated on the western edge of the territory that had been known as Damaraland in the 19th century.

=== Representative authority (1980–1989) ===
Following the Turnhalle Constitutional Conference, the system of Bantustans was replaced in 1980 by Representative Authorities which functioned on the basis of ethnicity only and were no longer based on geographically defined areas.

The Representative Authority of the Damaras had executive and legislative competencies, being made up of elected Legislative Assemblies which would appoint Executive Committees led by chairmen.

As second-tier authorities, forming an intermediate tier between central and local government, the representative authorities had responsibility for land tenure, agriculture, education up to primary level, teachers' training, health services, and social welfare and pensions and their Legislative Assemblies had the ability to pass legislation known as Ordinances.

=== Transition to independence (1989–1990) ===
Damaraland, like other homelands in South West Africa, was abolished in May 1989 at the start of the transition to independence.

The name Damaraland predates South African control of Namibia, and was described as "the central portion of German South West Africa" in the Encyclopædia Britannica Eleventh Edition.

== Leadership ==
Justus ǁGaroëb was the chairman of the Executive Committee from 1980 to 1989.

== See also ==
- Apartheid
- Bantustans in South West Africa
- Diocese of Namibia (formerly Diocese of Damaraland)
