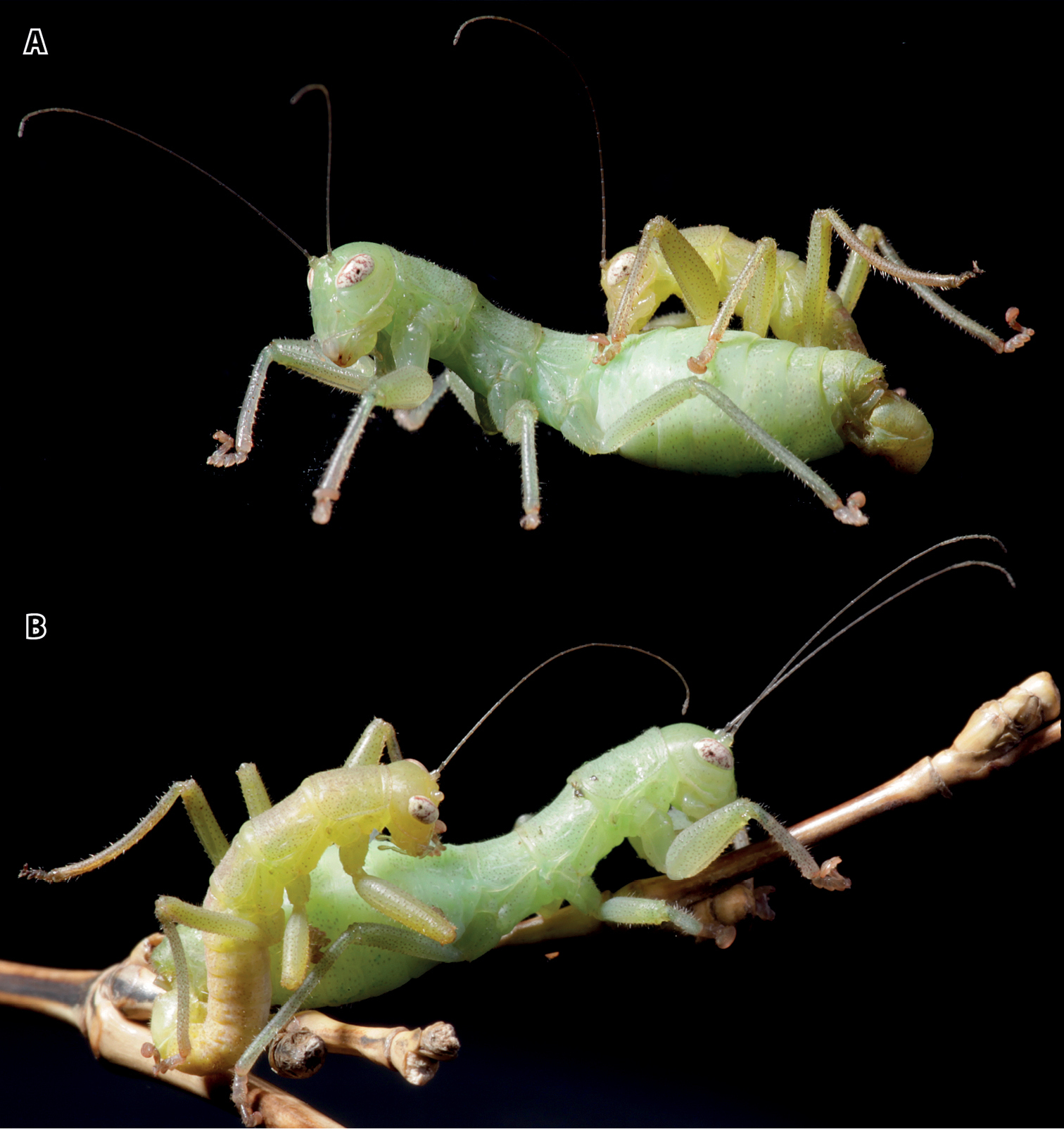

Scientific classification
- Kingdom: Animalia
- Phylum: Arthropoda
- Clade: Pancrustacea
- Class: Insecta
- Order: Mantophasmatodea
- Family: Mantophasmatidae
- Genus: Kuboesphasma; Wipfler, Theska & Predel, 2018.
- Species: K. compactum

Binomial name
- Kuboesphasma compactum Wipfler, Theska & Predel, 2018

= Kuboesphasma =

Genus of insects

Kuboesphasma is a genus of insects in the family Mantophasmatidae. It is a monotypic genus consisting of a single species, Kuboesphasma compactum. Its type locality is Kuboes, Richtersveld, South Africa. The discovery of this species along with Minutophasma richtersveldense means that this area contains a total of four mantophasmatodean species.

The genus name (gender neutral) is a combination of different terms. The first part (“Kuboes”) refers to the type locality it was found in, which is the center of the Nama community. The second part (“phasma”) is a common ending used for members of the order Mantophasmatodea.

== Taxonomy ==
This genus is a member of the family Mantophasmatidae. The phylogeny of K. compactum places it as the outgroup in a clade with genera such as Viridiphasma, Namaquaphasma and remaining genera of the family Austrophasmatidae.

== Description ==
Its whole body is bright green to green. It has a large body size compared to other genera such as Minutophasma, with males growing up to 12 mm and females growing up to 13 mm. Its head is globular in shape and it completely lacks wings. Located on the frons, there is a washed-out, indistinct butterfly-shaped spot. There is no black ventrolateral spot on the scapus and males lack a dark stripe on the dorsal median. On the protibia, males can have nine or more spikes per row, while their thorax has a distinct row of spines.
