= Oliver Zompro =

German biologist

Oliver Zompro is a German biologist who is credited with the discovery in 2002 of a new order of carnivorous African insects, Mantophasmatodea or "gladiators", which is sometimes relegated to subordinal status.

Zompro initially described gladiators from old museum specimens that originally were found in Namibia (Mantophasma zephyrum) and Tanzania (M. subsolanum), and from a 45-million-year-old specimen of Baltic amber (Raptophasma kerneggeri).

Live specimens were found in Namibia by an international expedition in early 2002; Tyrannophasma gladiator was found on the Brandberg Massif, and Mantophasma zephyrum was found on the Erongoberg Massif.
