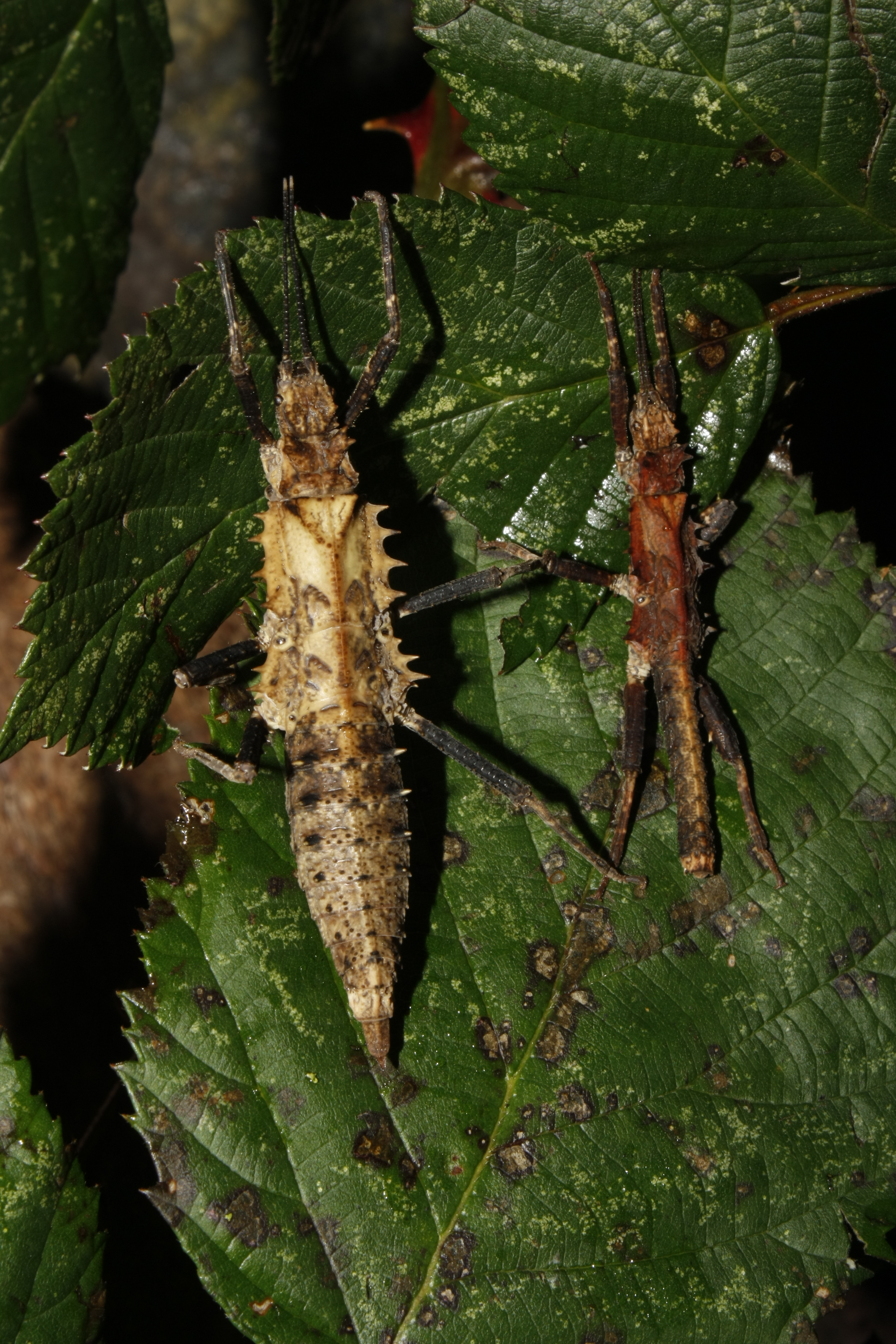
- Tisamenus clotho 'Camarines Norte', pair

Scientific classification
- Kingdom: Animalia
- Phylum: Arthropoda
- Class: Insecta
- Order: Phasmatodea
- Family: Heteropterygidae
- Subfamily: Obriminae
- Tribe: Obrimini
- Genus: Tisamenus
- Species: T. clotho

Binomial name
- Tisamenus clotho (Rehn, J.A.G. & Rehn, J.W.H., 1939)

Synonyms
- Hoploclonia clotho Rehn, J.A.G. & Rehn, J.W.H., 1939; Hoploclonia atropos Rehn, J.A.G. & Rehn, J.W.H., 1939; Tisamenus atropos (Rehn, J.A.G. & Rehn, J.W.H., 1939)

= Tisamenus clotho =

Species of stick insect

Tisamenus clotho is a stick insect species native to the Philippines.

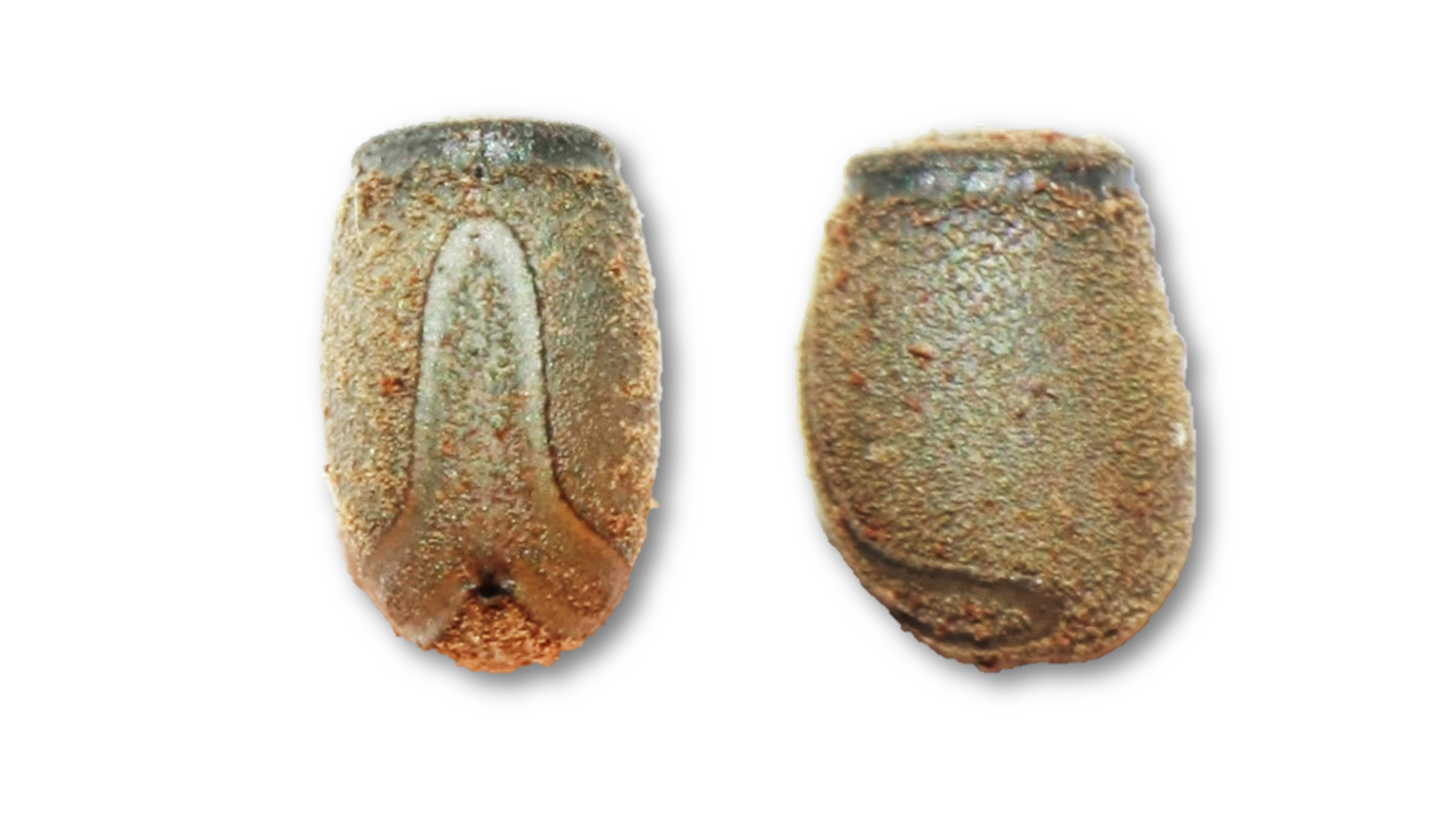
Eggs in dorsal and lateral view

== Description ==
Females of Tisamenus clotho are light brown to buckthorn brown and often show other shades of brown, with the head and legs being darker. They reach lengths about 56 millimetres (2.2 in). Males are significantly smaller and dark brown. The head is almost square and only slightly longer than wide. The supraorbitals are formed as three prominent, elongated tubercles. The occipitals and median coronals are present as flat tubercles, the lateral coronals are bifid, rounded tubercles. As with Tisamenus deplanatus, the triangular region typical of the genus on the mesonotum is relatively short, reaching just under the middle of the mesothorax, where it forms an approximately equilateral triangle forms. From the center of the base of the triangle at the anterior edge of the mesonotum, a faintly indicated carina runs across the triangle to its posterior angle. From there it extends as a prominent longitudinal carina further over the rest of the mesonotum and the entire metanotum. The mesopleura are armed with four lateral spines, the metapleura with two lateral spines. Behind are the supracoxals, which are also spiny and whose supracoxal angle is shaped into a short tubercle.

== Distribution ==
The type material of the species comes from Polillo Island, off the southeast coast of Luzon. The animals being bred were collected in two localities in the province of Camarines Norte in southern Luzon. These are located at Mount Bagacay in the Barangay Fundado of Labo and at Mananap falls in the Barangay Fabrica of Daet. Additional localities on Luzon have been documented from the southern province of Camarines Sur and the province of Nueva Ecija in central Luzon.

== Taxonomy ==
James Abram Garfield Rehn and his son John William Holman Rehn described the species in 1939 under the basionym Hoploclonia clotho. An adult female collected by Taylor on Polillo Island from the collection of Morgan Hebard at the Academy of Natural Sciences of Drexel University in Philadelphia was chosen as holotype. From the collection of the United States National Museum, a juvenile male has been chosen as allotype and an adult female as another paratype. In addition, Rehn and Rehn examined three other juvenile females from this collection and one juvenile male from the Hebard collection for their description. All specimens examined were from Polillo. The species name "clotho" is borrowed from Greek mythology. Clotho is the youngest of the three Moirai, although her two sisters are also used as species names in the species description of other Hoploclonia species in the same work. Rehn und Rehn divided the Philippine species of the genus into different groups according to morphological features. Hoploclonia clotho was placed with Hoploclonia serratoria (today Tisamenus serratorius), Hoploclonia asper (today Tisamenus asper), Hoploclonia atropis (today synonym of Tisamenus clotho) in the so-called Serratoria group. Their species are relatively spiny, have distinct lateral spines along the margins of the meso- and metathorax and an isosceles triangle on the anterior mesothorax, reaching about halfway down the mesonotum.

Also in 1939, Rehn and Rehn described Hoploclonia atropos. The species name "atropos" refers to the oldest of the three Moirai Atropos. The species was described from a female collected in 1932 and housed at the National Museum of Natural History in Washington, D.C.. This species was synonymized with Tisamenus clotho by Frank H. Hennemann in 2025. Since Oliver Zompro transferred the Philippine species to the genus Tisamenus in 2004 and left only those occurring on Borneo in the genus Hoploclonia, both Tisamenus clotho and its later synonym Tisamenus atropos have been listed in this genus.

In a molecular genetics study published in 2021, representatives of other Tisamenus species were included in addition to Tisamenus clotho from Camarines Norte. It turned out that the species is closely related to Tisamenus cervicornis, whose specimen was identified here as Tisamenus deplanatus. Tisamenus hystrix from Sibuyan Island and the then-undescribed Tisamenus malawak from Camiguin and Tisamenus heitzmanni from Cebu were also relatively closely related.

== In captivity ==
A stock keeping by enthusiasts in terrariums derives from specimens from Camarines Norte collected by Thierry Heitzmann on July 22 at Mount Bagacay and August 4, 2015, at Mananap falls. Their species affiliation was not certain at first, so they were named Tisamenus cf. clotho 'Camarines'. Joachim Bresseel identified these as Tisamenus clotho. The species is easy to keep and breed. They eat leaves of bramble, other Rosaceae and hazel.

== Gallery ==
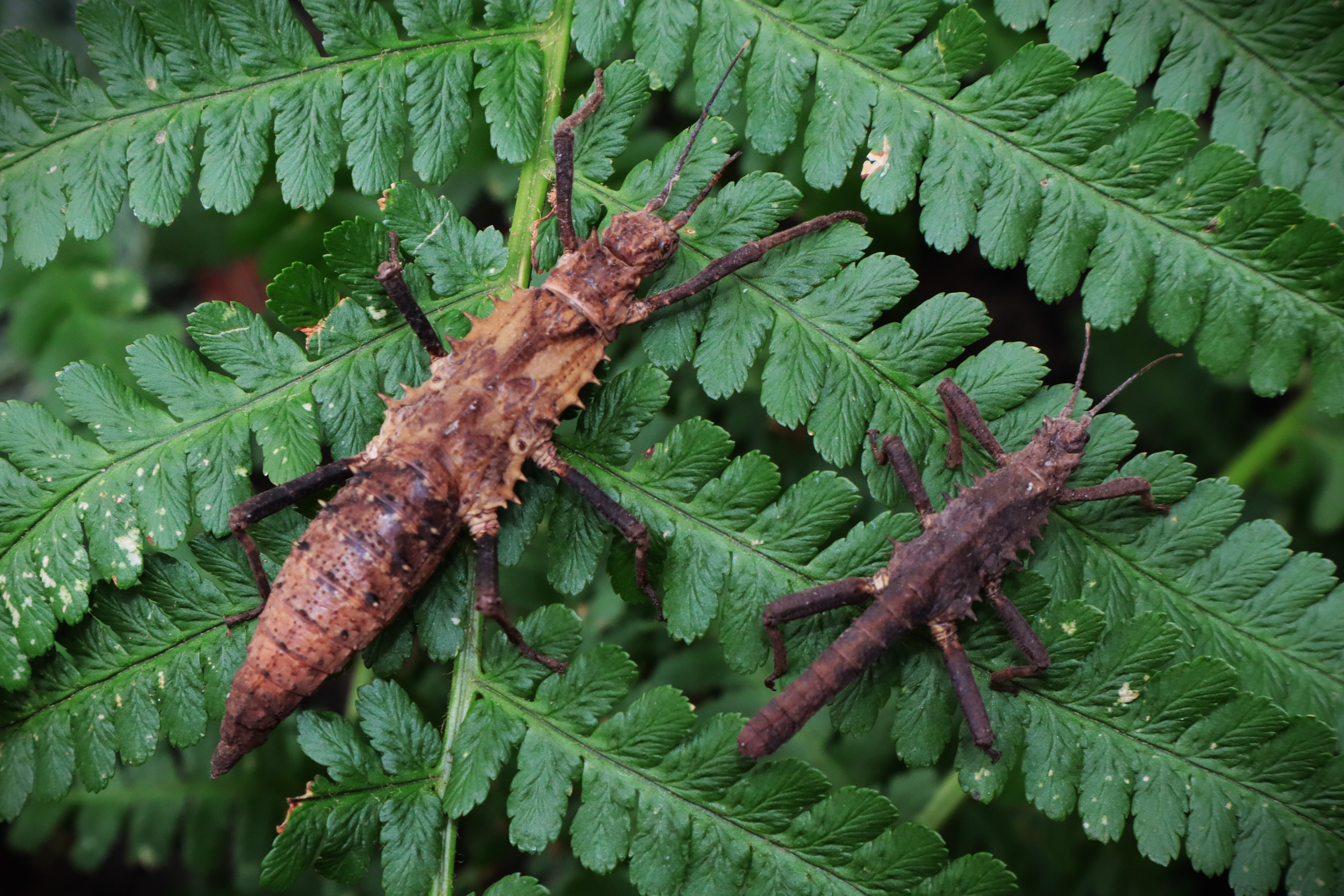
Pair of the stock from 'Camarines'

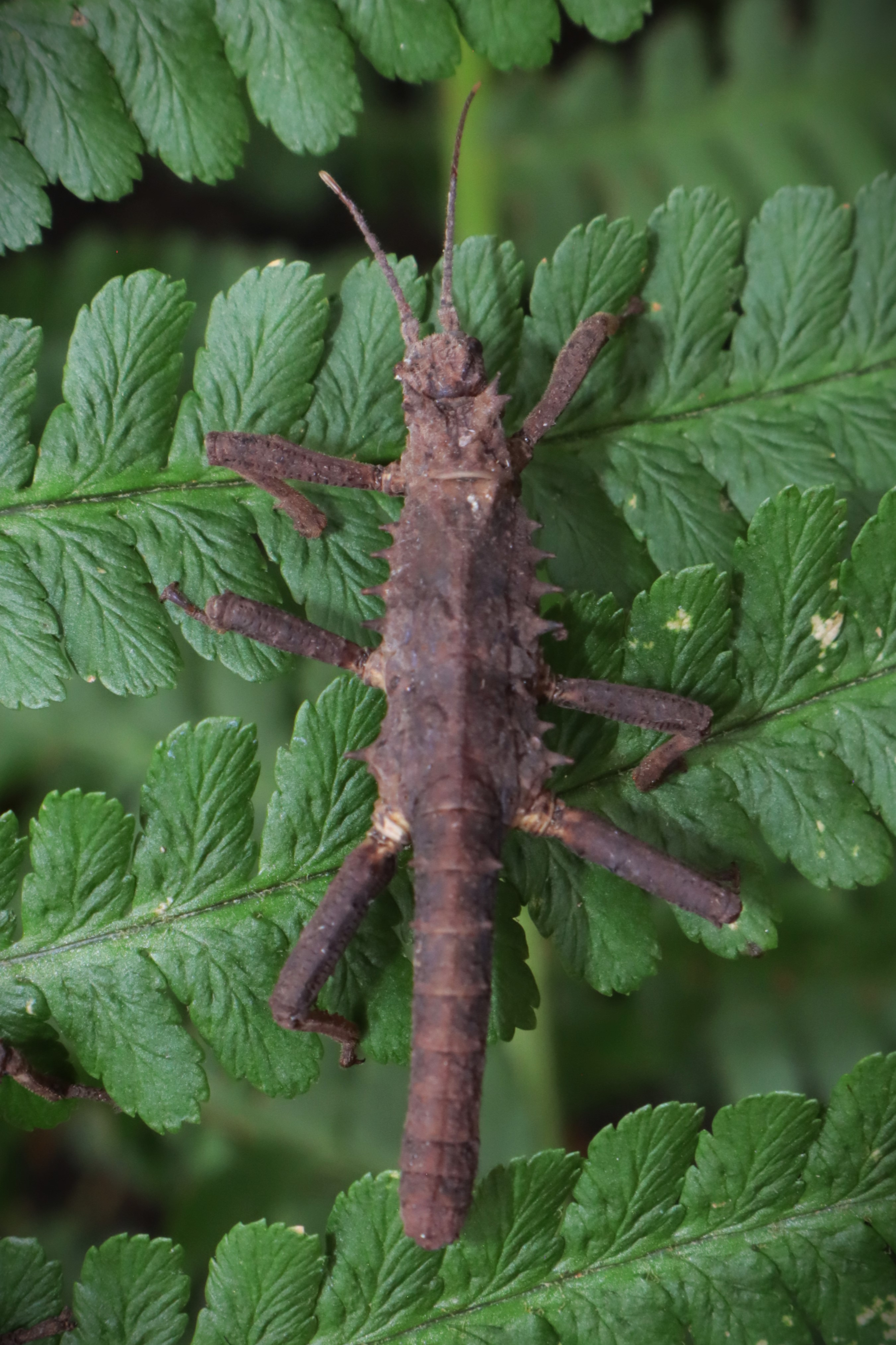
Male

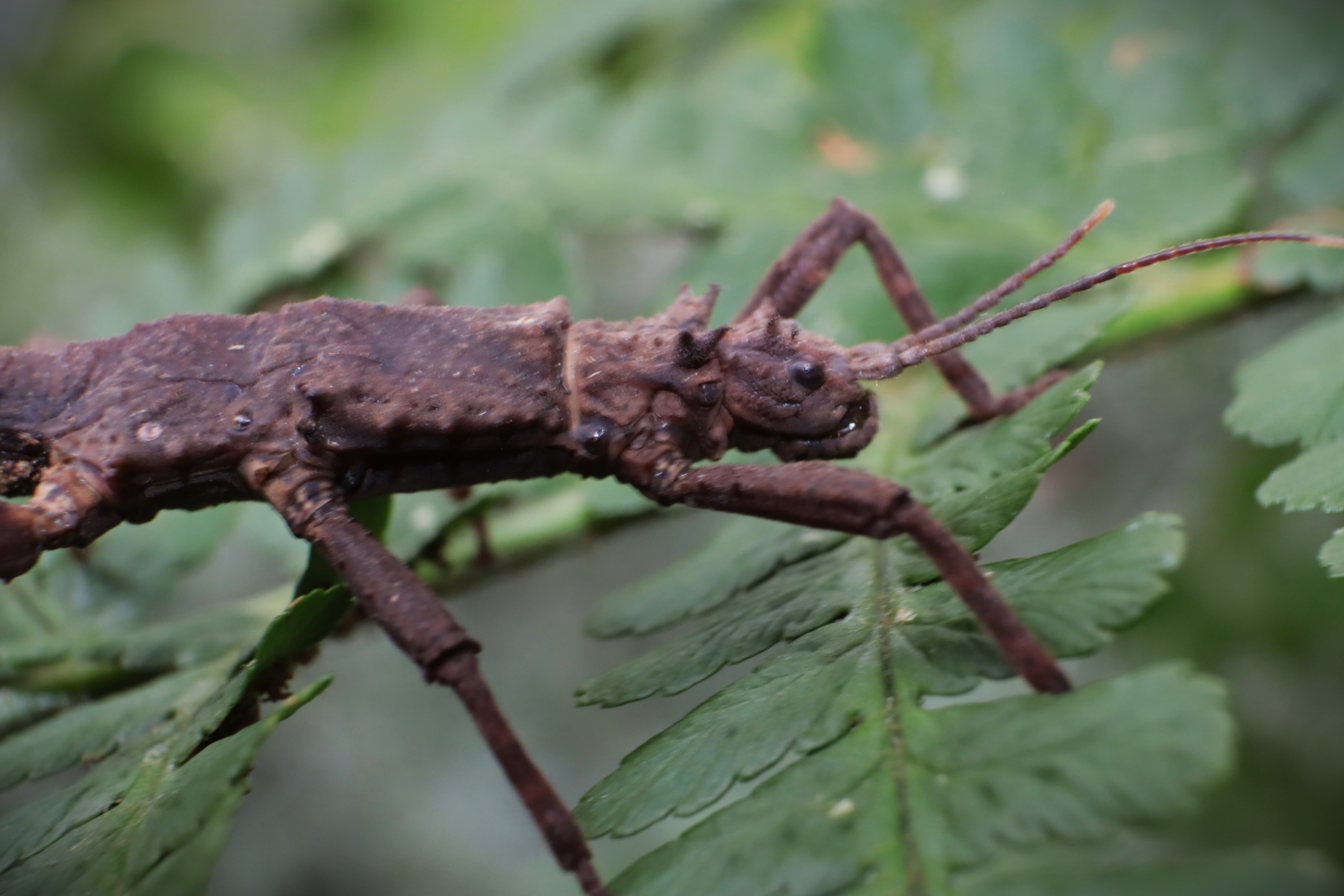
Portrait of a male

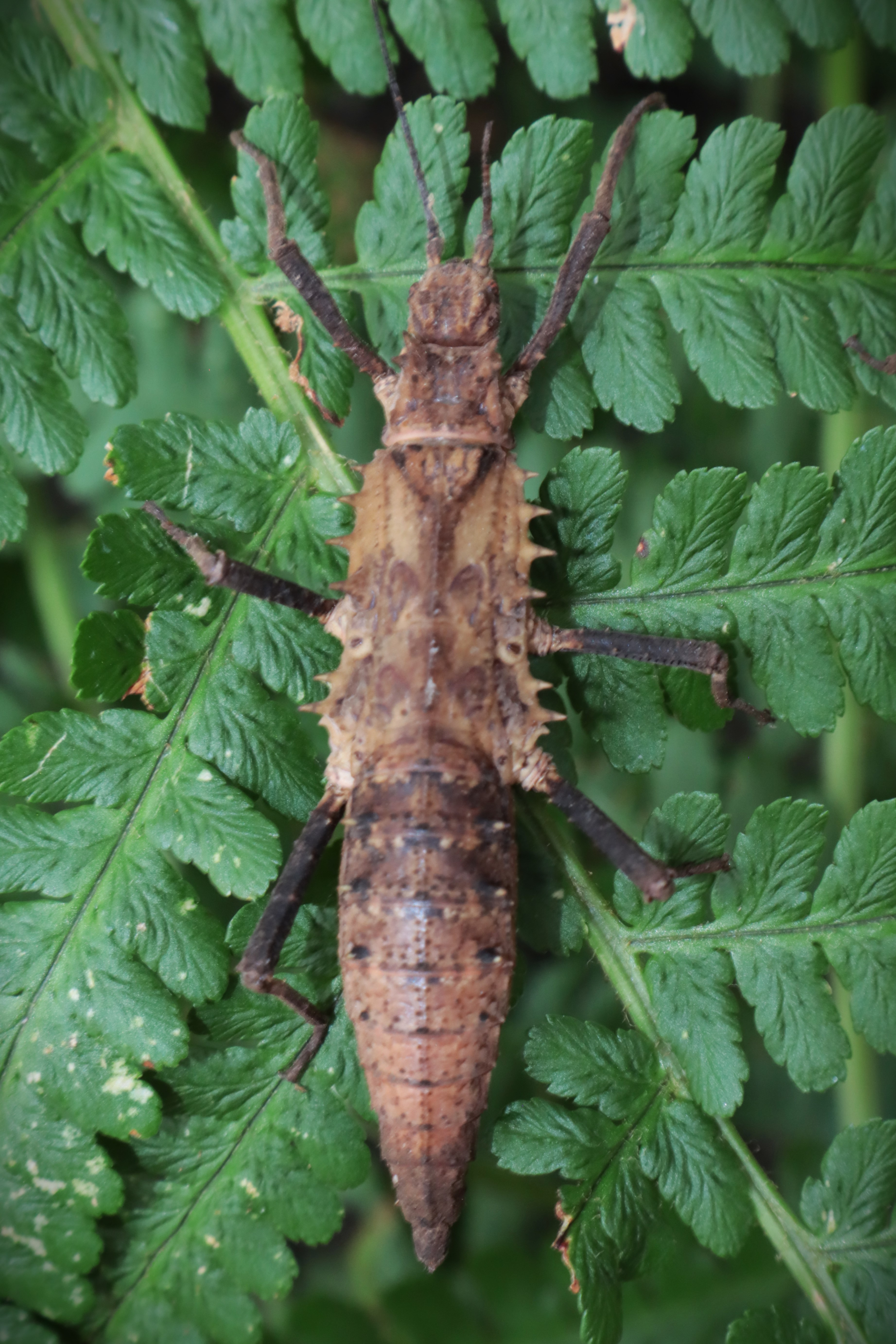
Female

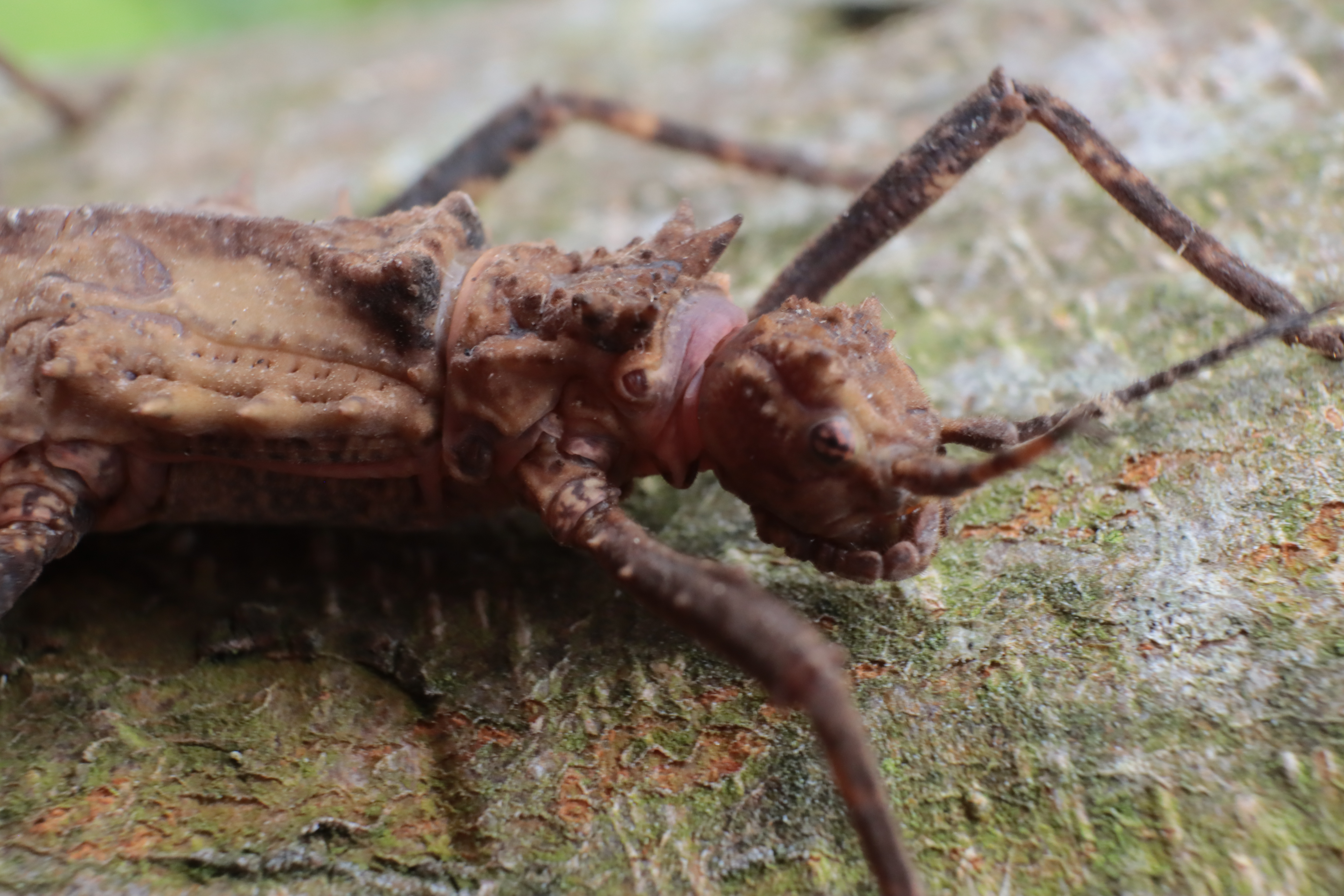
Portrait of a female
