= Pachyphasma =

Scientific classification
- Domain: Eukaryota
- Kingdom: Animalia
- Phylum: Arthropoda
- Class: Insecta
- Order: Mantophasmatodea
- Family: Mantophasmatidae
- Genus: Pachyphasma; Wipfler, Pohl, & Predel, 2012
- Species: P. brandbergense

Binomial name
- Pachyphasma brandbergense Wipfler, Pohl, & Predel, 2012

Genus of insects

Pachyphasma is a genus of insects in the family Mantophasmatidae. It is a monotypic genus consisting of the species Pachyphasma brandbergense.

Pachyphasma brandbergense is endemic to the Brandberg Massif of Namibia.
