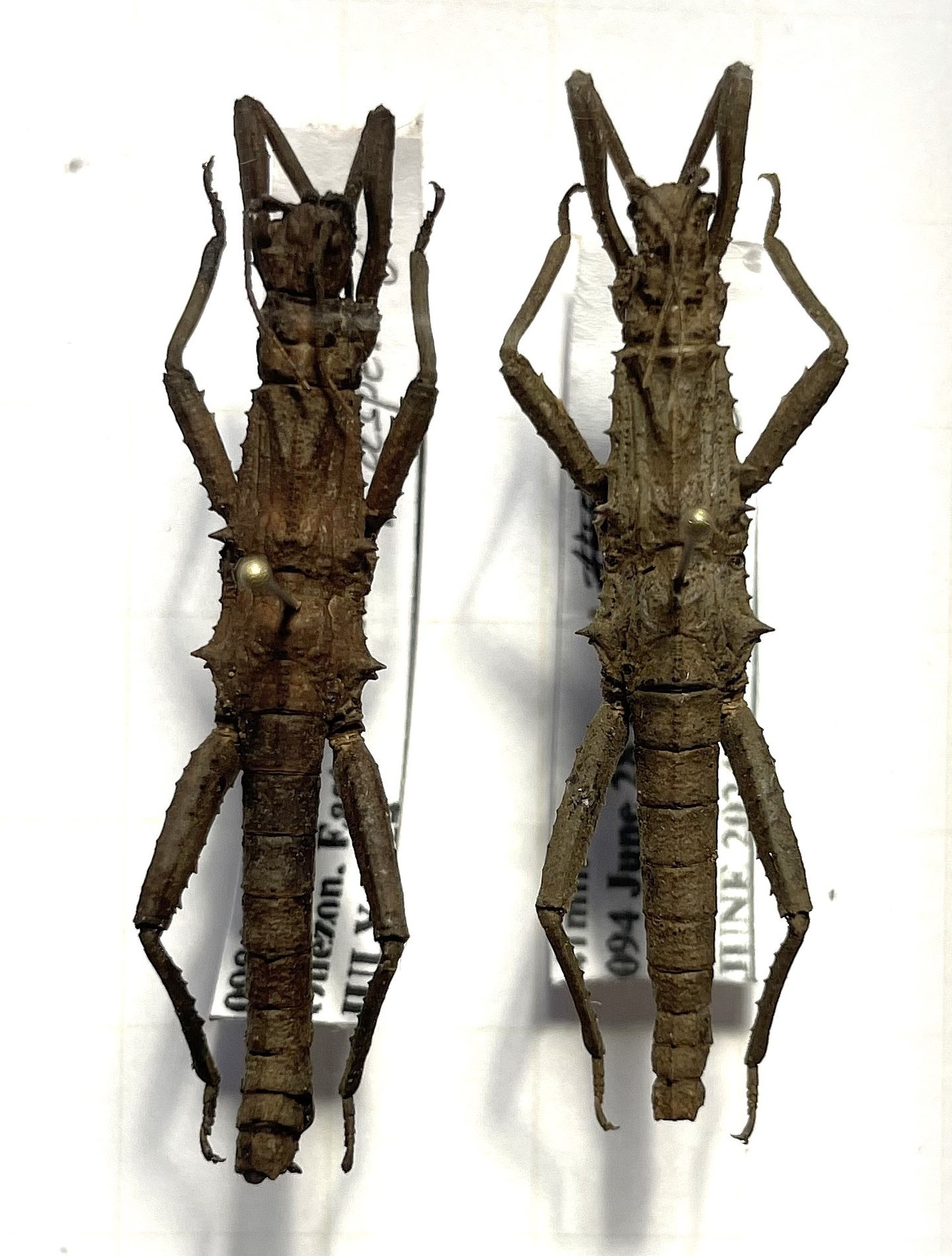
- Males of Tisamenus asper from the collection of Frank H. Hennemann

Scientific classification
- Kingdom: Animalia
- Phylum: Arthropoda
- Clade: Pancrustacea
- Class: Insecta
- Order: Phasmatodea
- Family: Heteropterygidae
- Subfamily: Obriminae
- Tribe: Obrimini
- Genus: Tisamenus
- Species: T. asper

Binomial name
- Tisamenus asper Bolívar, 1890

Synonyms
- Hoploclonia aspera (Bolívar, 1890)

= Tisamenus asper =

Species of stick insect

Tisamenus asper is a stick insect species (Phasmatodea), in the family of the Heteropterygidae endemic to the Philippine island Luzon.

== Description ==
Only a few specimens of this Tisamenus species are known so far. Ignacio Bolívar mentions characteristics of both male and female in the species description, but at the end only lists measurement data for one specimen without mentioning the gender. He states the total length as 50 millimetres (2.0 in). The species is very similar to Tisamenus serratorius. In Tisamenus asper the mesopleurae are thorny. On the first segments of the abdomen there are small round tubercules. In Tisamenus serratorius there are pairs of spines directed diagonally to the side, the length of which decreases from front to back. On the head there are postorbital ridges with finer teeth at the front and coarser teeth at the back.

== Taxonomy ==
Bolívar described the species in 1890 under the current name. The species name “asper” is borrowed from Latin and means rough. A male and a female syntype are deposited in the Museo Nacional de Ciencias Naturales in Madrid. While the status of the male is questionable, the female labeled by Bolivar is certainly a syntype of Tisamenus asper. It is missing some tarsi and, like the male, the ends of the antennae.

James Abram Garfield Rehn and his son John William Holman Rehn synonymized in 1939 the genus Tisamenus with the genus Hoploclonia. At the same time, they divided the genus into different groups according to morphological aspects. In the so-called Serratoria group, they placed Hoploclonia aspera, the eponymous Hoploclonia serratoria (today Tisamenus serratorius), Hoploclonia clotho (today Tisamenus clotho) and Hoploclonia atropos (today synonym of Tisamenus clotho), species with distinct lateral spines along the edges of the thorax and one extending to about half of the mesonotum, isosceles triangle on the anterior mesothorax.

The original name was officially restored in 2004 by Oliver Zompro, who transferred or retransferred all Filipino species previously listed in Hoploclonia to the genus Tisamenus.

== Distribution ==
Bolívar names Mazarredo, Angat, in the province of Bulacan as the origin of the animals he examined. According to the label of the female syntype, this is Mount Angat. Frank H. Hennemann examined two males of this species. One of this specimens was collected on June 16, 2012, near Norzagaray in the province of Bulacan, the other in July 2004 in Minahan in the municipality of General Nakar in the province of Quezon.
