= Mantophasma gamsbergense =

Scientific classification
- Domain: Eukaryota
- Kingdom: Animalia
- Phylum: Arthropoda
- Class: Insecta
- Order: Mantophasmatodea
- Family: Mantophasmatidae
- Genus: Mantophasma
- Species: M. gamsbergense

Binomial name
- Mantophasma gamsbergense Zompro & Adis, 2006

Species of insect

Mantophasma gamsbergense is a species of insect in the family Mantophasmatidae. It is endemic to Namibia.

Its type locality is Gamsberg in Windhoek District, Namibia (23°20′50.4″S 16°13′34.6″E).
