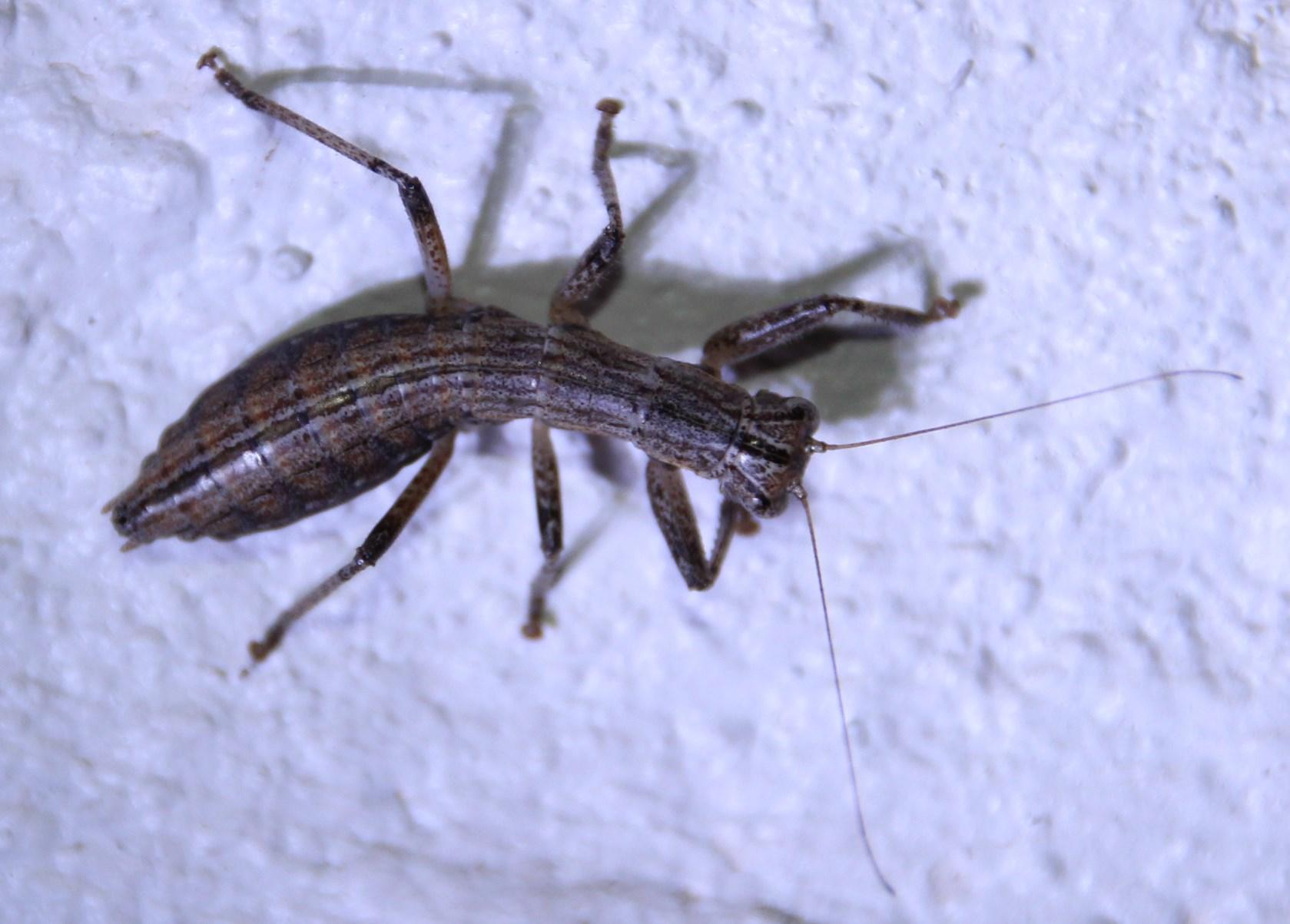
- Karoophasma biedouwense

Scientific classification
- Domain: Eukaryota
- Kingdom: Animalia
- Phylum: Arthropoda
- Class: Insecta
- Order: Mantophasmatodea
- Family: Mantophasmatidae
- Genus: Karoophasma; Klass, Picker, Damgaard, van Noort, Tojo, 2003

Species
- Karoophasma biedouwense Klass, Picker, Damgaard, van Noort & Tojo, 2003; Karoophasma botterkloofense Klass, Picker, Damgaard, van Noort & Tojo, 2003

= Karoophasma =

Genus of insects

Karoophasma is a genus of insects in the family Mantophasmatidae. It contains 2 species that are endemic to western South Africa.

== Species ==
These species belong to the genus Karoophasma:

- Karoophasma biedouwense Klass, Picker, Damgaard, van Noort & Tojo, 2003
- Karoophasma botterkloofense Klass, Picker, Damgaard, van Noort & Tojo, 2003
