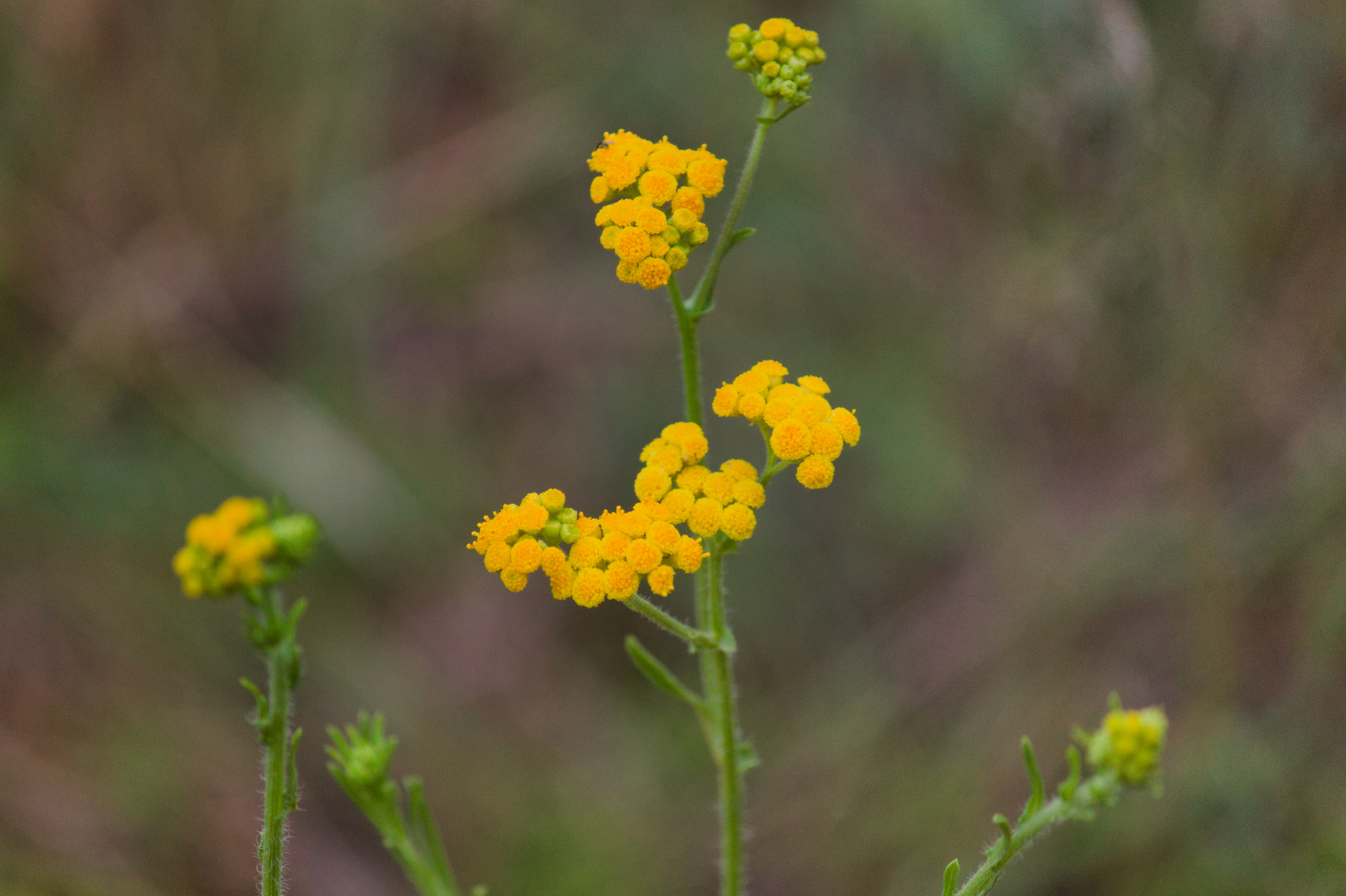
- Close-up of flower head, Mabalingwe Nature Reserve

Scientific classification
- Kingdom: Plantae
- Clade: Embryophytes
- Clade: Tracheophytes
- Clade: Angiosperms
- Clade: Eudicots
- Clade: Asterids
- Order: Asterales
- Family: Asteraceae
- Genus: Nidorella
- Species: N. resedifolia

Binomial name
- Nidorella resedifolia DC.

= Nidorella resedifolia =

Species of flowering plant

Nidorella resedifolia, commonly known as the reseda-leaved nidorella or maridadi, is a species of flowering plant in the family Asteraceae. Native to eastern and southern Africa, it is a hardy herbaceous perennial often found in grasslands, savannas, and disturbed areas.

== Description ==
Nidorella resedifolia is an erect, annual or perennial herb that typically grows to a height of 0.5 to 1.5 m (1.6 to 4.9 ft). Its stems are usually single at the base but branch out towards the top. They are often hairy (pubescent) and greenish in color. The leaves are alternate and deeply lobed or pinnatifid, resembling the foliage of plants in the genus Reseda, which gives the species its specific epithet resedifolia. The leaves are generally sessile (lacking a stalk) and can grow up to 80 mm (3.1 in) long. The plant produces dense, flat-topped clusters (corymbs) of small, bright yellow flower heads (capitula). Each head is approximately 5 to 10 mm (0.20 to 0.39 in) in diameter. The ray florets are minute or absent, giving the flower heads a "button-like" appearance similar to Tanacetum vulgare (tansy). The fruit is a small achene topped with a pappus of bristles, aiding in wind dispersal.

== Distribution and habitat ==
The species is widespread across eastern and southern Africa, including Angola, Botswana, the Democratic Republic of the Congo, Eswatini, Ethiopia, Lesotho, Mozambique, Namibia, Zimbabwe and South Africa. It is also found in Madagascar.

In South Africa, it is particularly common in the northern provinces, including Limpopo, Gauteng, and Mpumalanga. It favors open, sunny environments and is often associated with the grassland and savanna biomes. It is considered a pioneer species that readily colonizes disturbed soil, roadsides, and old cultivated lands.

== Toxicity ==
While N. resedifolia is generally considered unpalatable to livestock due to its strong aromatic oils, it contains alkaloids that can be toxic if ingested in large quantities. Toxicity reports are rare because animals typically avoid the plant unless grazing pressure is high or during periods of drought. It is frequently confused with the more dangerous Senecio species (ragworts), which have a similar growth habit and yellow flowers.
