= Austrophasma =

Scientific classification
- Domain: Eukaryota
- Kingdom: Animalia
- Phylum: Arthropoda
- Class: Insecta
- Order: Mantophasmatodea
- Family: Mantophasmatidae
- Genus: Austrophasma; Klass, Picker, Damgaard, van Noort, Tojo, 2003

Species
- Austrophasma caledonense Klass, Picker, Damgaard, van Noort & Tojo, 2003; Austrophasma gansbaaiense Klass, Picker, Damgaard, van Noort & Tojo, 2003; Austrophasma rawsonvillense Klass, Picker, Damgaard, van Noort & Tojo, 2003

Genus of insects

Austrophasma is a genus of insects in the family Mantophasmatidae. It contains 3 species that are endemic to Western Cape Province, South Africa.

== Species ==
These species belong to the genus Austrophasma:

- Austrophasma caledonense Klass, Picker, Damgaard, van Noort & Tojo, 2003
- Austrophasma gansbaaiense Klass, Picker, Damgaard, van Noort & Tojo, 2003
- Austrophasma rawsonvillense Klass, Picker, Damgaard, van Noort & Tojo, 2003
