= Mantophasma omatakoense =

Scientific classification
- Domain: Eukaryota
- Kingdom: Animalia
- Phylum: Arthropoda
- Class: Insecta
- Order: Mantophasmatodea
- Family: Mantophasmatidae
- Genus: Mantophasma
- Species: M. omatakoense

Binomial name
- Mantophasma omatakoense Zompro & Adis, 2006

Species of insect

Mantophasma omatakoense is a species of insect in the family Mantophasmatidae. It is endemic to Namibia.

Its type locality is Omatako Farm, near the Omatako Mountains, between Otjiwarongo and Okahandja at 21°20.72′S 16°43.92′E.
