= Lobatophasma =

Scientific classification
- Domain: Eukaryota
- Kingdom: Animalia
- Phylum: Arthropoda
- Class: Insecta
- Order: Mantophasmatodea
- Family: Mantophasmatidae
- Genus: Lobatophasma; Damgaard, Klass, Picker & Buder, 2008
- Species: L. redelinghuysense

Binomial name
- Lobatophasma redelinghuysense (Klass, Picker, Damgaard, van Noort, Tojo, 2003)

Synonyms
- Lobophasma Klass, Picker, Damgaard, van Noort, Tojo, 2003

Genus of insects

Lobatophasma (formerly Lobophasma) is a genus of insects in the family Mantophasmatidae. It is a monotypic genus consisting of the species Lobatophasma redelinghuysense, which is endemic to Western Cape Province, South Africa.

It is known from near Redelinghuys, Rawsonville, Cardouw, and Jonkiespoort in the Western Cape Province.
