= Striatophasma =

Scientific classification
- Domain: Eukaryota
- Kingdom: Animalia
- Phylum: Arthropoda
- Class: Insecta
- Order: Mantophasmatodea
- Family: Mantophasmatidae
- Genus: Striatophasma; Wipfler, Pohl & Predel, 2012
- Species: S. naukluftense

Binomial name
- Striatophasma naukluftense Wipfler, Pohl & Predel, 2012

Genus of insects

Striatophasma is a genus of insects in the family Mantophasmatidae. It is a monotypic genus consisting of the species Striatophasma naukluftense.

Striatophasma naukluftense is endemic to central Namibia. It is found in the Naukluft Mountains.
