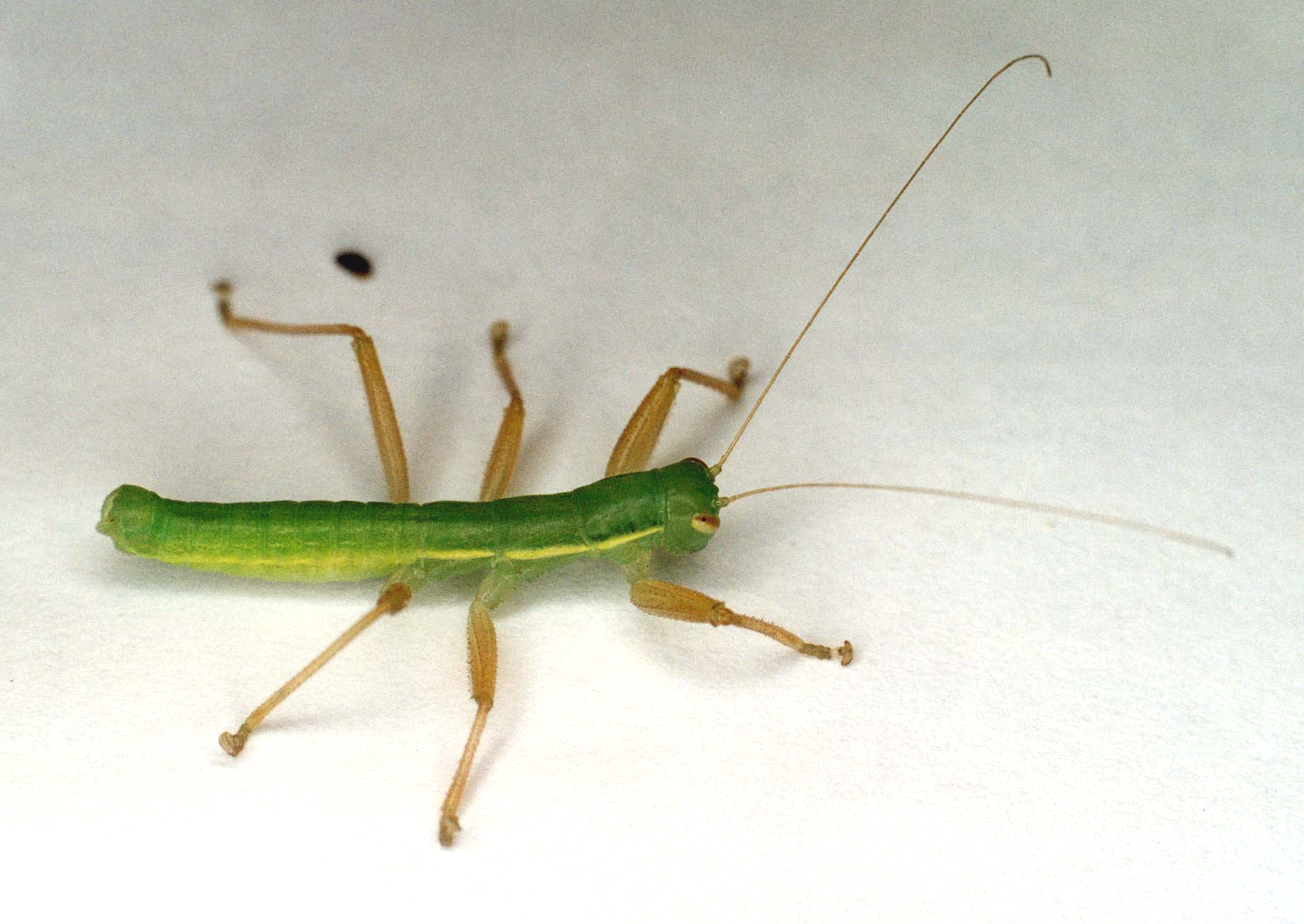
- Mantophasma zephyra Zompro et al., 2002

Scientific classification
- Domain: Eukaryota
- Kingdom: Animalia
- Phylum: Arthropoda
- Class: Insecta
- Order: Mantophasmatodea
- Family: Mantophasmatidae
- Genus: Mantophasma; Zompro, Klass, Kristensen, Adis, 2002

Species
- Mantophasma gamsbergense Zompro & Adis, 2006; Mantophasma kudubergense Zompro & Adis, 2006; Mantophasma omatakoense Zompro & Adis, 2006; Mantophasma zephyra Zompro, Klass, Kristensen, & Adis 2002

= Mantophasma =

Genus of insects

Mantophasma is a genus of insects in the family Mantophasmatidae. It contains 4 species, all of which are endemic to Namibia.

== Species ==
These species belong to the genus Mantophasma:

- Mantophasma gamsbergense Zompro & Adis, 2006
- Mantophasma kudubergense Zompro & Adis, 2006
- Mantophasma omatakoense Zompro & Adis, 2006
- Mantophasma zephyra Zompro, Klass, Kristensen, & Adis 2002
