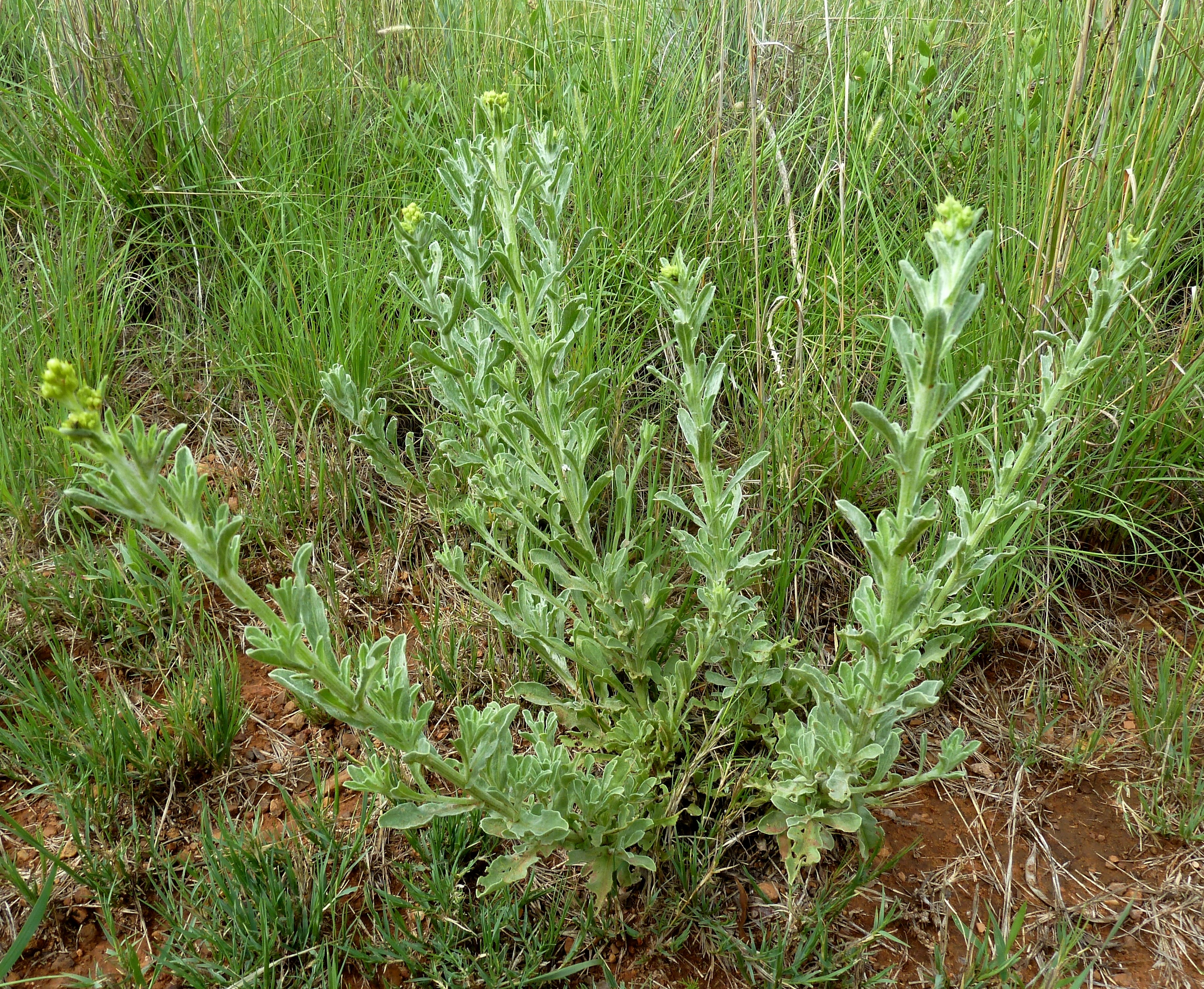
- Nidorella hottentotica

Scientific classification
- Kingdom: Plantae
- Clade: Tracheophytes
- Clade: Angiosperms
- Clade: Eudicots
- Clade: Asterids
- Order: Asterales
- Family: Asteraceae
- Subfamily: Asteroideae
- Tribe: Astereae
- Subtribe: Grangeinae
- Genus: Nidorella; Cass.

= Nidorella =

Genus of flowering plants

Nidorella is a genus of African flowering plants in the tribe Astereae within the family Asteraceae, colloquially known as vleiweed.

Species

- Nidorella agria Hilliard
- Nidorella anomala Steetz
- Nidorella auriculata DC.
- Nidorella burundiensis Lisowski
- Nidorella compressa Cass. ex Steud.
- Nidorella foetida (L.) DC.
- Nidorella hottentotica DC.
- Nidorella linifolia DC.
- Nidorella microcephala Steetz
- Nidorella nordenstamii Wild
- Nidorella resedifolia DC.
- Nidorella spartioides (O.Hoffm.) Cronquist
- Nidorella tongensis Hilliard
- Nidorella umbrosa Wild
- Nidorella undulata (Thunb.) Sond. ex Harv.
- Nidorella zavattarii (Lanza) Cufod.
