= Hemilobophasma =

Scientific classification
- Domain: Eukaryota
- Kingdom: Animalia
- Phylum: Arthropoda
- Class: Insecta
- Order: Mantophasmatodea
- Family: Mantophasmatidae
- Genus: Hemilobophasma; Klass, Picker, Damgaard, van Noort & Tojo, 2003
- Species: H. montaguense

Binomial name
- Hemilobophasma montaguense Klass, Picker, Damgaard, van Noort & Tojo, 2003

Genus of insects

Hemilobophasma is a genus of insects in the family Mantophasmatidae. It is a monotypic genus consisting of the species Hemilobophasma montaguense, which is endemic to Western Cape Province, South Africa. Its type locality is an area near Montagu.
