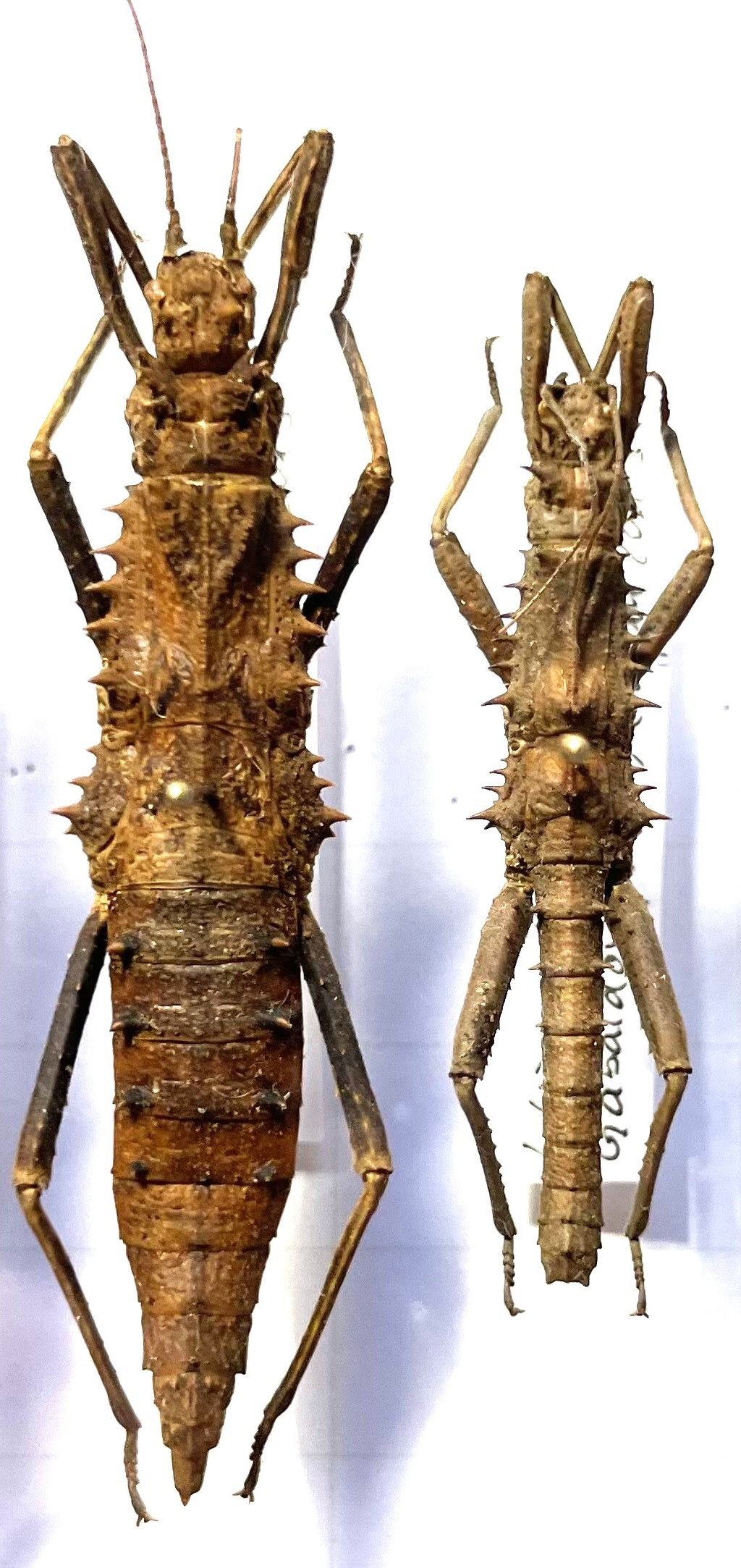
- Tisamenus serratorius, pair from the collection of Frank H. Hennemann

Scientific classification
- Kingdom: Animalia
- Phylum: Arthropoda
- Clade: Pancrustacea
- Class: Insecta
- Order: Phasmatodea
- Family: Heteropterygidae
- Subfamily: Obriminae
- Tribe: Obrimini
- Genus: Tisamenus
- Species: T. serratorius

Binomial name
- Tisamenus serratorius Stål, 1875

Synonyms
- Hoploclonia serratoria (Stål, 1875)

= Tisamenus serratorius =

Species of stick insect

Tisamenus serratorius is a stick insect species that occurs on the Philippine island Luzon. It is the type species of the genus Tisamenus.

== Description ==
On the head of the males is a pair of spines pointing forward and upward. On the pronotum there are three pairs of clear spines arranged in a group that runs obliquely outwards. On the sides of the elongated mesothorax there are five distinct spines, on its upper side an isosceles triangle formed by raised edges can be found. The base of this triangle is attached to the front edge of the mesonotum, is strongly raised and reinforced with spines at the corners. On the sides of the metathorax there are three spines, the length of which increases from front to back. As an extension of the posterior tip of the triangle from the mesonotum, there is a longitudinal ridge on the metanotum. On this, at the rear edge of the meso- and metanotum, there can be two closely spaced tubercles, which can rarely be formed as short, blunt spines. The abdomen is slender and almost cylindrical. On its first to third and partly fourth segment there is a pair of spines directed obliquely to the side, the length of which decreases from front to back.

The females are about 60 to 62 millimetres (2.4 to 2.4 in) long. The number and arrangement of body structures and spines, with all of the spines being much shorter and blunt. The thorax becomes even wider from the prothorax to the metathorax, just as the abdomen gradually becomes narrower again towards the end, so that the body looks slightly on both sides convex when viewed from above. The abdomen ends in a relatively short ovipositor.

== Taxonomy ==
In 1875, Carl Stål described Tisamenus serratorius in the genus Tisamenus, which he also described, using a female from the collection of Carl Brunner von Wattenwyl. This is today the holotype of the species and is deposited in the Natural History Museum, Vienna. The species name derives from Latin en "serrato "for sawn off and refers to the sawtooth-like reinforced side edges of the thorax. In 1904, William Forsell Kirby established Tisamenus serratorius as the type species of the genus. In 1939 the genus Tisamenus was synonymized with the genus Hoploclonia, whereby the species initially named as Hoploclonia serratoria and later as Hoploclonia serratorius. At the same time the genus Hoploclonia was divided into different groups according to morphological aspects. In the so-called Serratoria group, they placed with Hoploclonia serratorius, Hoploclonia asper (today Tisamenus asper), Hoploclonia clotho (today Tisamenus clotho) and Hoploclonia atropos (today Tisamenus atropos), relatively strongly spiny species, with clear lateral spines along the edges of the thorax and an isosceles triangle reaching up to about half of the anterior mesonotum. In 2004 the Filipino species were transferred back to the genus Tisamenus and only those occurring on Borneo were left in the genus Hoploclonia. Tisamenus serratorius got its original name and status back as type species of the genus.

== In terraristics ==
The first breeding stocks of representatives of the genus Tisamenus were collected between 2008 and 2010. After initially being referred to as Tisamenus sp. 'Sierra Madre' or Tisamenus sp. 'Real' as well as Tisamenus sp. 'Quezon National Park' and Tisamenus sp. 'Cunayan', these strains were temporarily in circulation as Tisamenus serratorius. However, Frank H. Hennemann identified these in 2024 as representatives of the larger and very variable Tisamenus lachesis. Accordingly, Tisamenus serratorius has not been bred to date and all publications on the breeding stocks of Tisamenus serratorius refer to Tisamenus lachesis. This applies to the breeding stock listed by the Phasmid Study Group under PSG number 314 as well as to the stock listed under PSG number 359 and referred to as Tisamenus sp. 'Cunayan'.
