= Doros Complex =

Igneous intrusion in Namibia

- Location within Namibia

Highest point
- Coordinates: 20°44′42″S 14°17′59″E

Geography
- Location: Kunene, Namibia

Doros Complex is a differentiated igneous intrusion in the Damaraland region of Namibia. It lies to the northwest of the country's highest peak, Brandberg Mountain. It is regarded as one of the finest and best viewed examples of a differentiated complex in Southern Africa.

The gabbroic lopolith intrusion is about 17 km^{2} in area with a thickness of 500 m. The Doros Complex has intruded sediments of the Karoo Sequence, from which it is separated by sharp contacts.
