= Austrophasma gansbaaiense =

Scientific classification
- Domain: Eukaryota
- Kingdom: Animalia
- Phylum: Arthropoda
- Class: Insecta
- Order: Mantophasmatodea
- Family: Mantophasmatidae
- Genus: Austrophasma
- Species: A. gansbaaiense

Binomial name
- Austrophasma gansbaaiense Klass, Picker, Damgaard, van Noort, Tojo, 2003

Species of insect

Austrophasma gansbaaiense is a species of insect in the family Mantophasmatidae. It is endemic to western South Africa, where it is only known from near Gansbaai in Western Cape Province.
