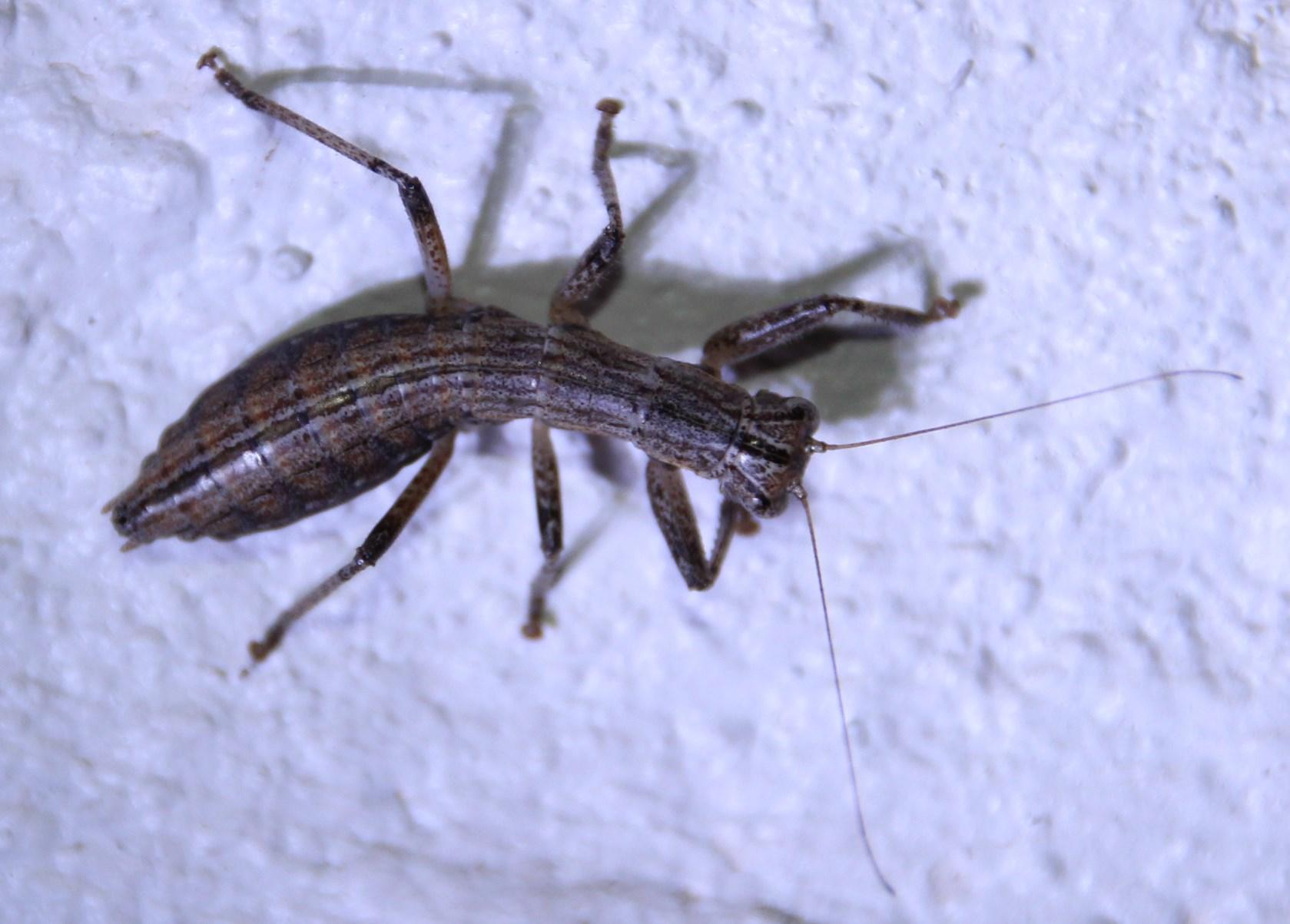

Scientific classification
- Domain: Eukaryota
- Kingdom: Animalia
- Phylum: Arthropoda
- Class: Insecta
- Order: Mantophasmatodea
- Family: Mantophasmatidae
- Genus: Karoophasma
- Species: K. biedouwense

Binomial name
- Karoophasma biedouwense Klass, Picker, Damgaard, van Noort, Tojo, 2003

= Karoophasma biedouwense =

Species of insect

Karoophasma biedouwense is a species of insect in the family Mantophasmatidae. It is endemic to the Biedouw Valley of Western Cape Province, South Africa, in a restricted area that includes the settlements of Biedouw, Driefontein, and Wolfdrif.
