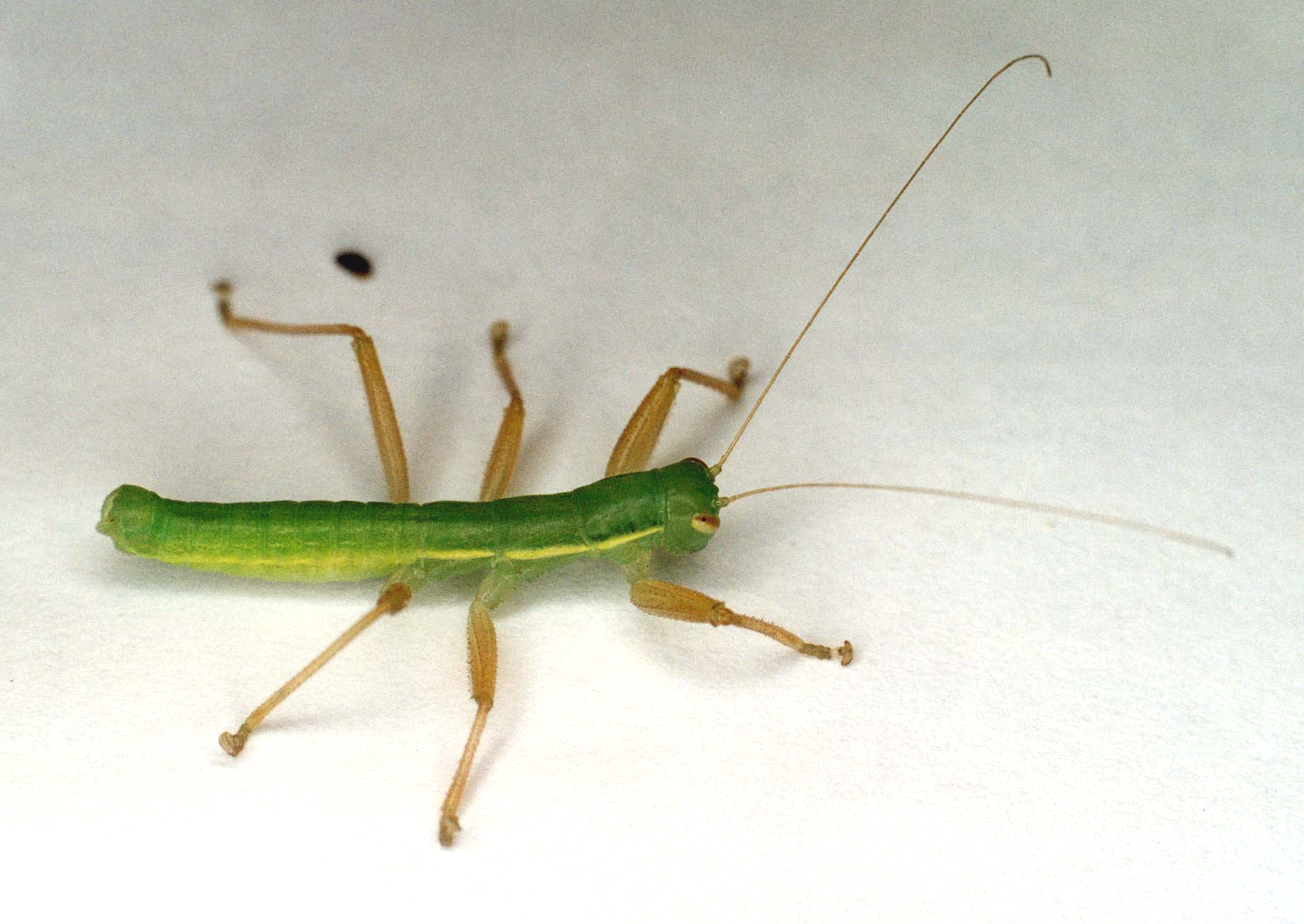
- Mantophasma zephyra Zompro et al., 2002

Scientific classification
- Kingdom: Animalia
- Phylum: Arthropoda
- Clade: Pancrustacea
- Class: Insecta
- Clade: Notoptera
- Order: Mantophasmatodea; Zompro et al., 2002
- Family: Mantophasmatidae; Zompro et al., 2002

Subfamilies and tribes
- see text

= Mantophasmatidae =

Mantophasmatidae Temporal range: Callovian–Present

Family of insects

Mantophasmatidae is a family of carnivorous wingless insects in southern Africa which are placed within the order or suborder Mantophasmatodea. They were discovered in 2001. They are the sister group of the Grylloblattidae, classified in the order or suborder Grylloblattodea.

Arillo and Engel have combined the Grylloblattodea and Mantophasmatodea into a single order, Notoptera, with the two groups ranked as suborders. Alternatively, Grylloblattodea and Mantophasmatodea are considered orders of a clade Xenonomia.

== Overview ==
The most common vernacular name for this order is gladiators, although they also are called rock crawlers, heelwalkers, mantophasmids, and colloquially, mantos. Their modern centre of endemism is western South Africa and Namibia (Brandberg Massif), although the modern relict population of Tanzaniophasma subsolana in Tanzania and Eocene fossils suggest a wider ancient distribution.

Mantophasmatodea are wingless even as adults, making them difficult to identify. They resemble a cross between praying mantises and phasmids, and molecular evidence indicates that they are most closely related to the equally enigmatic group Grylloblattodea. Initially, the gladiators were described from old museum specimens that originally were found in Namibia (Mantophasma zephyra) and Tanzania (M. subsolana), and from a 45-million-year-old specimen of Baltic amber (Raptophasma kerneggeri).

Live specimens were found in Namibia by an international expedition in early 2002; Tyrannophasma gladiator was found on the Brandberg Massif, and Mantophasma zephyra was found on the Erongoberg Massif.

Since then, a number of new genera and species have been discovered, the most recent being two new genera, Kuboesphasma and Minutophasma, each with a single species, described from Richtersveld in South Africa in 2018.

== Biology ==
Mantophasmatids are wingless carnivores. During courtship, they communicate using vibrations transmitted through the ground or substrate. Both males and females have one-segmented cerci. During copulation, the male uses his cerci to grasp the female after bending his flexible abdomen around her right side, and mating can last for up to three days.

== Classification ==
The classification of Mantophasmatodea in Arillo & Engel (2006) recognizes numerous genera, including fossils, in a single family Mantophasmatidae:

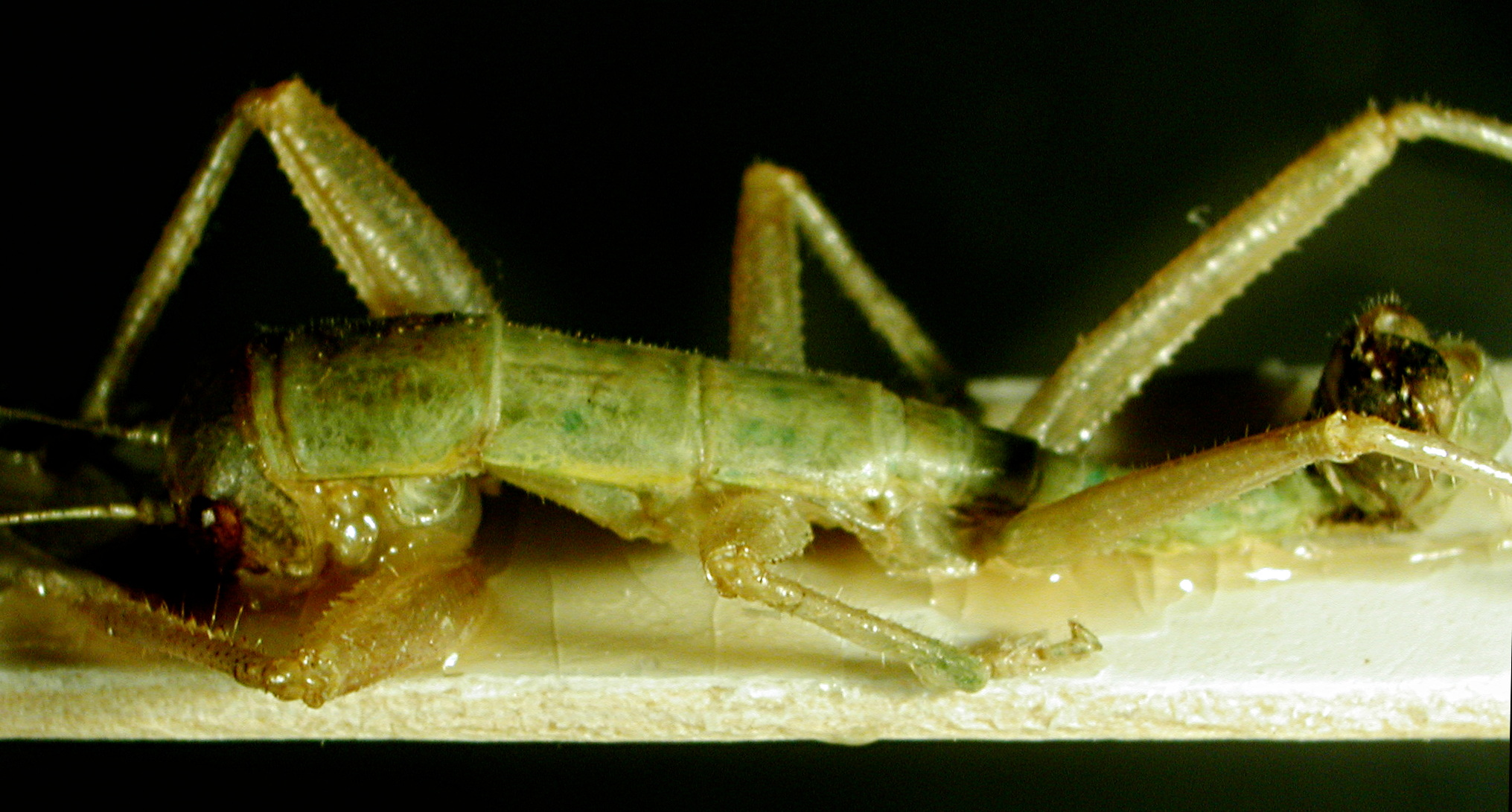
Unidentified mantophasmid species in the Zoologische Staatssammlung München

- Basal and incertae sedis
  - Genus †Raptophasma Zompro, 2001 – Baltic amber, Eocene
  - Genus †Adicophasma Engel & Grimaldi, 2004 – Baltic amber, Eocene
  - Genus †Juramantophasma Huang et al, 2008 – Daohugou Bed, China, Middle Jurassic (Callovian)
  - Genus ?†Ensiferophasma Zompro, 2005 – Baltic amber, Eocene (assignment to Mantophasmatodea considered dubious) (Note: This genus is sometimes placed in its own family, Ensiferophasmatidae.)
- Subfamily Tanzaniophasmatinae Klass, Picker, Damgaard, van Noort, Tojo, 2003 (Note: This subfamily is sometimes known as the family Tanzaniophasmatidae.)
  - Genus Tanzaniophasma Klass, Picker, Damgaard, van Noort, Tojo, 2003 – Tanzania
    - Species Tanzaniophasma subsolana (Zompro, Klass, Kristensen, & Adis 2002)
- Subfamily Mantophasmatinae
  - Tribe Tyrannophasmatini Zompro, 2005
    - Genus Praedatophasma Zompro & Adis, 2002 – Namibia
      - Species Praedatophasma maraisi Zompro & Adis, 2002
    - Genus Tyrannophasma Zompro, 2003 – Namibia
      - Species Tyrannophasma gladiator Zompro, 2003
  - Tribe Mantophasmatini Zompro, Klass, Kristensen, Adis, 2002 (paraphyletic?)
    - Genus Mantophasma Zompro, Klass, Kristensen, Adis, 2002 – Namibia
      - Species Mantophasma gamsbergense Zompro & Adis, 2006
      - Species Mantophasma kudubergense Zompro & Adis, 2006
      - Species Mantophasma omatakoense Zompro & Adis, 2006
      - Species Mantophasma zephyra Zompro, Klass, Kristensen, & Adis 2002
    - Genus Pachyphasma Wipfler, Pohl, & Predel, 2012 – Namibia
      - Species Pachyphasma brandbergense Wipfler, Pohl, & Predel, 2012
    - Genus Sclerophasma Klass, Picker, Damgaard, van Noort, Tojo, 2003 – Namibia
      - Species Sclerophasma paresisense Klass, Picker, Damgaard, van Noort, & Tojo 2003
  - Tribe Austrophasmatini Klass, Picker, Damgaard, van Noort, Tojo, 2003 (Note: This tribe is sometimes known as the family Austrophasmatidae.)
    - Genus Austrophasma Klass, Picker, Damgaard, van Noort, Tojo, 2003 – South Africa
      - Species Austrophasma caledonense Klass, Picker, Damgaard, van Noort & Tojo, 2003
      - Species Austrophasma gansbaaiense Klass, Picker, Damgaard, van Noort & Tojo, 2003
      - Species Austrophasma rawsonvillense Klass, Picker, Damgaard, van Noort & Tojo, 2003
    - Genus Hemilobophasma Klass, Picker, Damgaard, van Noort, Tojo, 2003 – South Africa
      - Species Hemilobophasma montaguense Klass, Picker, Damgaard, van Noort & Tojo, 2003
    - Genus Karoophasma Klass, Picker, Damgaard, van Noort, Tojo, 2003 – South Africa
      - Species Karoophasma biedouwense Klass, Picker, Damgaard, van Noort & Tojo, 2003
      - Species Karoophasma botterkloofense Klass, Picker, Damgaard, van Noort & Tojo, 2003
    - Genus Kuboesphasma Wipfler, Theska & Predel, 2018 – South Africa
      - Species Kuboesphasma compactum Wipfler, Theska & Predel, 2018
    - Genus Lobatophasma Damgaard, Klass, Picker & Buder, 2008 (formerly Lobophasma Klass, Picker, Damgaard, van Noort & Tojo, 2003) – South Africa
      - Species Lobatophasma redelinghuysense (Klass, Picker, Damgaard, van Noort & Tojo, 2003)
    - Genus Minutophasma Wipfler, Theska & Predel, 2018 – South Africa
      - Species Minutophasma richtersveldense Wipfler, Theska & Predel, 2018
    - Genus Namaquaphasma Klass, Picker, Damgaard, van Noort, Tojo, 2003 – South Africa
      - Species Namaquaphasma ookiepense Klass, Picker, Damgaard, van Noort, Tojo, 2003
    - Genus Striatophasma Wipfler, Pohl & Predel, 2012 – Namibia
      - Species Striatophasma naukluftense Wipfler, Pohl & Predel, 2012
    - Genus Viridiphasma Eberhard, Picker, Klass, 2011 – South Africa
      - Species Viridiphasma clanwilliamense Eberhard, Picker, Klass, 2011

Some taxonomists assign full family status to the subfamilies and tribes, and sub-ordinal status to the family. In total, there are 21 extant species described as of 2018.

== See also ==
- Oliver Zompro
