= Tyrannophasma =

Scientific classification
- Domain: Eukaryota
- Kingdom: Animalia
- Phylum: Arthropoda
- Class: Insecta
- Order: Mantophasmatodea
- Family: Mantophasmatidae
- Genus: Tyrannophasma; Zompro, 2003
- Species: T. gladiator

Binomial name
- Tyrannophasma gladiator Zompro, 2003

Genus of insects

Tyrannophasma is a genus of insects in the family Mantophasmatidae. It is a monotypic genus consisting of the species Tyrannophasma gladiator, which is endemic to the Brandberg Massif of central Namibia. It is the largest known species of gladiator, measuring up to 32 mm (1.3 in) in length.
