= Praedatophasma =

Scientific classification
- Domain: Eukaryota
- Kingdom: Animalia
- Phylum: Arthropoda
- Class: Insecta
- Order: Mantophasmatodea
- Family: Mantophasmatidae
- Genus: Praedatophasma; Zompro & Adis, 2002
- Species: P. maraisi

Binomial name
- Praedatophasma maraisi Zompro & Adis, 2002

Genus of insects

Praedatophasma is a genus of insects in the family Mantophasmatidae. It is a monotypic genus consisting of the species Praedatophasma maraisi, which is endemic to southern Namibia.
