= Raptophasma =

Scientific classification
- Kingdom: Animalia
- Phylum: Arthropoda
- Class: Insecta
- Order: Mantophasmatodea
- Family: Mantophasmatidae
- Genus: †Raptophasma; Zombro, 2001

Extinct genus of Gladiator insect

Raptophasma is an extinct genus of Mantophasmatidae that lived mainly in the Baltic region of Europe.

There are three species contained in this genus:

1. Raptophasma groehni
2. Raptophasma kerneggeri
3. Raptophasma neli
