= Karoophasma botterkloofense =

Scientific classification
- Domain: Eukaryota
- Kingdom: Animalia
- Phylum: Arthropoda
- Class: Insecta
- Order: Mantophasmatodea
- Family: Mantophasmatidae
- Genus: Karoophasma
- Species: K. botterkloofense

Binomial name
- Karoophasma botterkloofense Klass, Picker, Damgaard, van Noort, Tojo, 2003

Species of insect

Karoophasma botterkloofense is a species of insect in the family Mantophasmatidae. It is endemic to Northern Cape Province, South Africa, in a restricted area that encompasses the Botterkloof Pass and the settlement Calvinia.
