= Sclerophasma =

Scientific classification
- Domain: Eukaryota
- Kingdom: Animalia
- Phylum: Arthropoda
- Class: Insecta
- Order: Mantophasmatodea
- Family: Mantophasmatidae
- Genus: Sclerophasma; Klass, Picker, Damgaard, van Noort, Tojo, 2003
- Species: S. paresisense

Binomial name
- Sclerophasma paresisense Klass, Picker, Damgaard, van Noort, Tojo, 2003

Genus of insects

Sclerophasma is a genus of insects in the family Mantophasmatidae. It is a monotypic genus consisting of the species Sclerophasma paresisense.

Sclerophasma paresisense is endemic to Namibia, where it is only known from the Paresisberge.
