= Mantophasma kudubergense =

Scientific classification
- Domain: Eukaryota
- Kingdom: Animalia
- Phylum: Arthropoda
- Class: Insecta
- Order: Mantophasmatodea
- Family: Mantophasmatidae
- Genus: Mantophasma
- Species: M. kudubergense

Binomial name
- Mantophasma kudubergense Zompro & Adis, 2006

Species of insect

Mantophasma kudubergense is a species of insect in the family Mantophasmatidae. It is endemic to Namibia.

Its type locality is the Erongo Mountains of Namibia (21°40′42″S 15°45′32″E).
