= Tanzaniophasma =

Scientific classification
- Domain: Eukaryota
- Kingdom: Animalia
- Phylum: Arthropoda
- Class: Insecta
- Order: Mantophasmatodea
- Family: Mantophasmatidae
- Genus: Tanzaniophasma; Klass, Picker, Damgaard, van Noort, Tojo, 2003
- Species: T. subsolana

Binomial name
- Tanzaniophasma subsolana (Zompro, Klass, Kristensen, & Adis 2002)

Genus of insects

Tanzaniophasma is a genus of insects in the family Mantophasmatidae. It is a monotypic genus consisting of the species Tanzaniophasma subsolana, which is endemic to Tanzania.
