= Nidorella nordenstamii =

Conservation status
- Least Concern (IUCN 3.1)

Scientific classification
- Kingdom: Plantae
- Clade: Tracheophytes
- Clade: Angiosperms
- Clade: Eudicots
- Clade: Asterids
- Order: Asterales
- Family: Asteraceae
- Genus: Nidorella
- Species: N. nordenstamii

Binomial name
- Nidorella nordenstamii Wild

Species of flowering plant

Nidorella nordenstamii is a species of flowering plant in the family Asteraceae. It is found only in Namibia.
