= Viridiphasma =

Scientific classification
- Domain: Eukaryota
- Kingdom: Animalia
- Phylum: Arthropoda
- Class: Insecta
- Order: Mantophasmatodea
- Family: Mantophasmatidae
- Genus: Viridiphasma; Eberhard, Picker, Klass, 2011
- Species: V. clanwilliamense

Binomial name
- Viridiphasma clanwilliamense Eberhard, Picker, Klass, 2011

Genus of insects

Viridiphasma is a genus of insects in the family Mantophasmatidae. It is a monotypic genus consisting of the species Viridiphasma clanwilliamense, which is endemic to Western Cape Province, South Africa.

Its type locality is Clanwilliam Dam, Western Cape Province.
