= Namaquaphasma =

Scientific classification
- Domain: Eukaryota
- Kingdom: Animalia
- Phylum: Arthropoda
- Class: Insecta
- Order: Mantophasmatodea
- Family: Mantophasmatidae
- Genus: Namaquaphasma; Klass, Picker, Damgaard, van Noort, Tojo, 2003
- Species: N. ookiepense

Binomial name
- Namaquaphasma ookiepense Klass, Picker, Damgaard, van Noort, Tojo, 2003

Genus of insects

Namaquaphasma is a genus of insects in the family Mantophasmatidae. It is a monotypic genus consisting of the species Namaquaphasma ookiepense, which is endemic to Northern Cape Province, South Africa. Its type locality is Ookiep.
