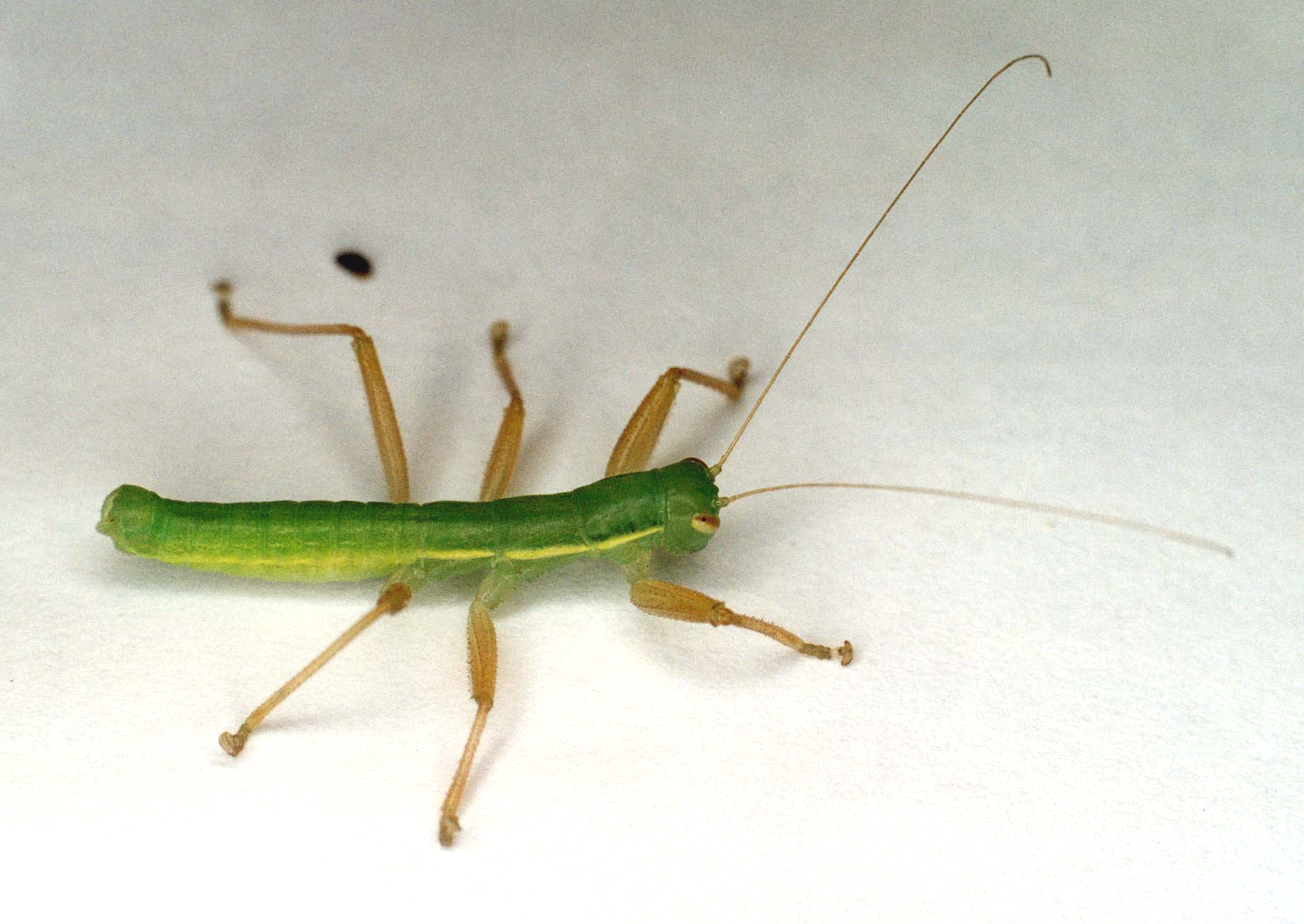

Scientific classification
- Domain: Eukaryota
- Kingdom: Animalia
- Phylum: Arthropoda
- Class: Insecta
- Order: Mantophasmatodea
- Family: Mantophasmatidae
- Genus: Mantophasma
- Species: M. zephyra

Binomial name
- Mantophasma zephyra Zompro, Klass, Kristensen, & Adis 2002

= Mantophasma zephyra =

Species of insect

Mantophasma zephyra is a species of insect in the family Mantophasmatidae. It is endemic to Namibia.
