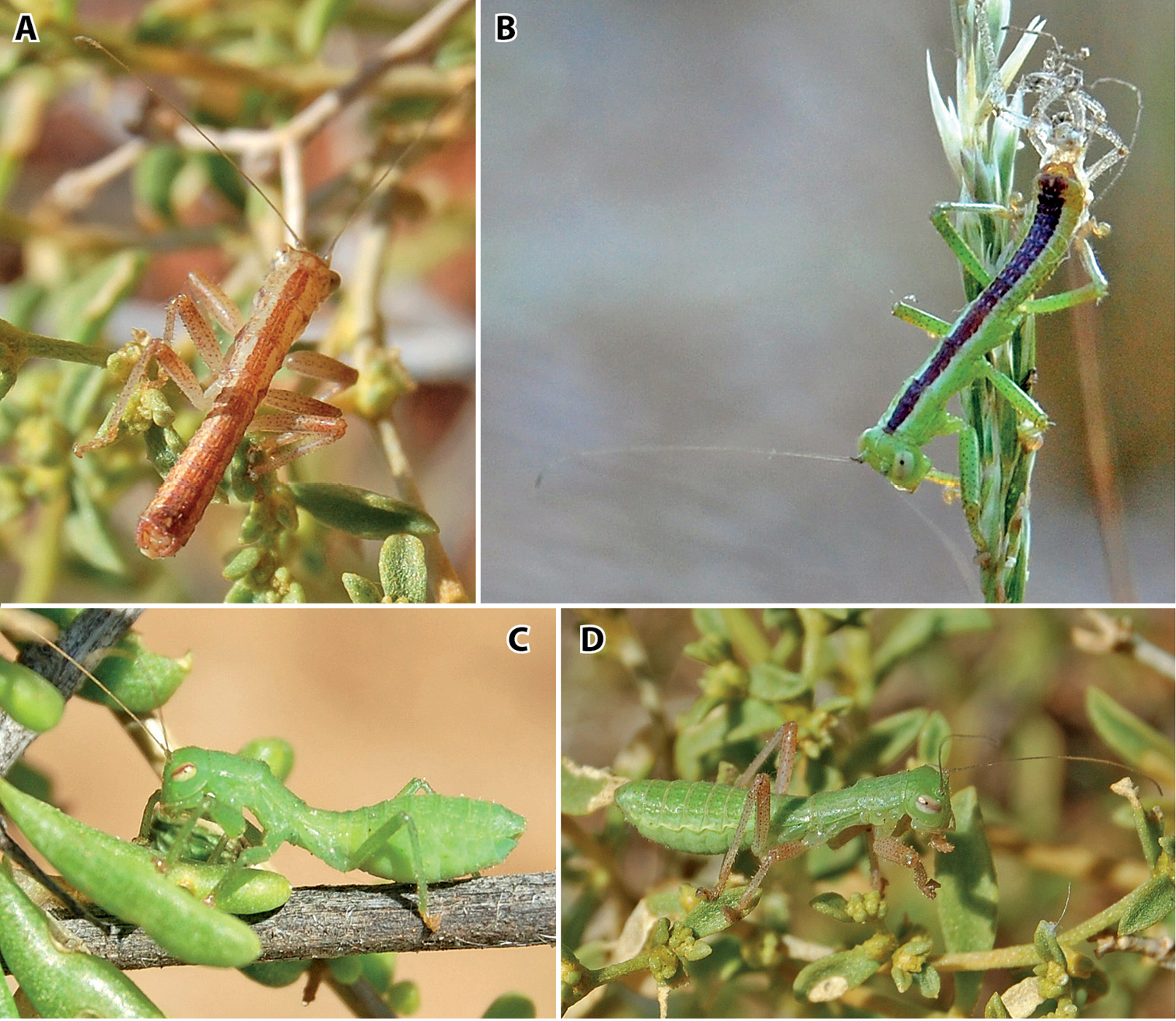

Scientific classification
- Domain: Eukaryota
- Kingdom: Animalia
- Phylum: Arthropoda
- Class: Insecta
- Order: Mantophasmatodea
- Family: Mantophasmatidae
- Genus: Minutophasma; Wipfler, Theska & Predel, 2018.
- Species: M. richtersveldense

Binomial name
- Minutophasma richtersveldense Wipfler, Theska & Predel, 2018

= Minutophasma =

Genus of insects

Minutophasma is a genus of insects in the family Mantophasmatidae. It is a monotypic genus consisting of the species Minutophasma richtersveldense.

Its type locality is located slightly to the north of Eksteenfontein, Richtersveld, South Africa.
