= Brandberg Mountain =

Highest mountain in Namibia

Brandberg
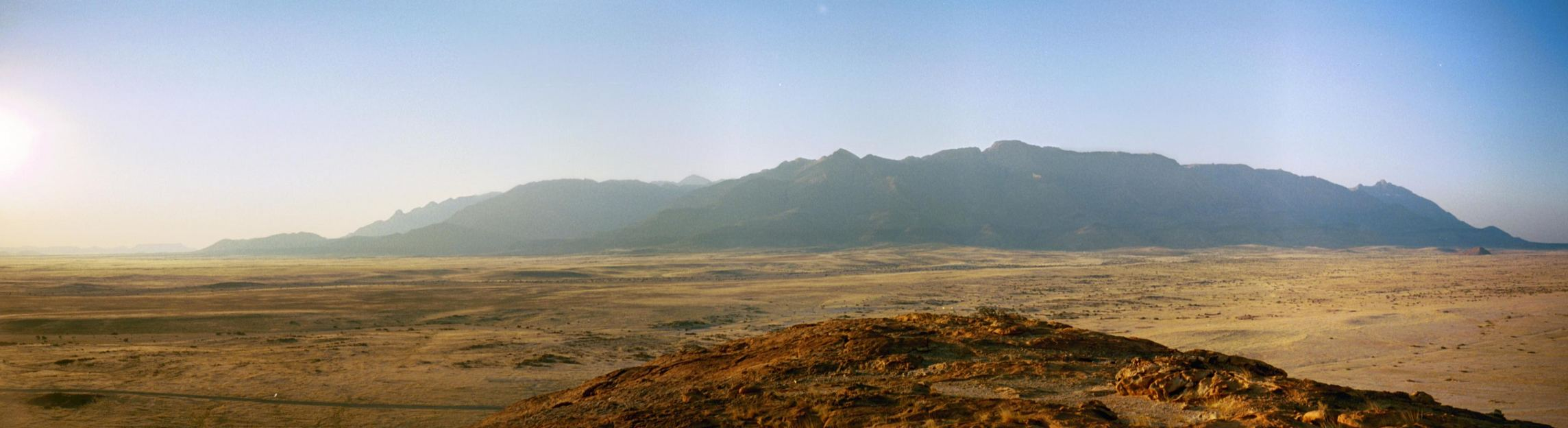
- The Brandberg Massif viewed from the south at sunset

Highest point
- Elevation: 2,573 m (8,442 ft)
- Prominence: 1,802 m (5,912 ft)
- Listing: Country high point Ultra
- Coordinates: 21°07′33″S 14°32′55″E

Naming
- English translation: Burning Mountain
- Language of name: German

Geography
- Location within Namibia
- Location: Erongo, Namibia

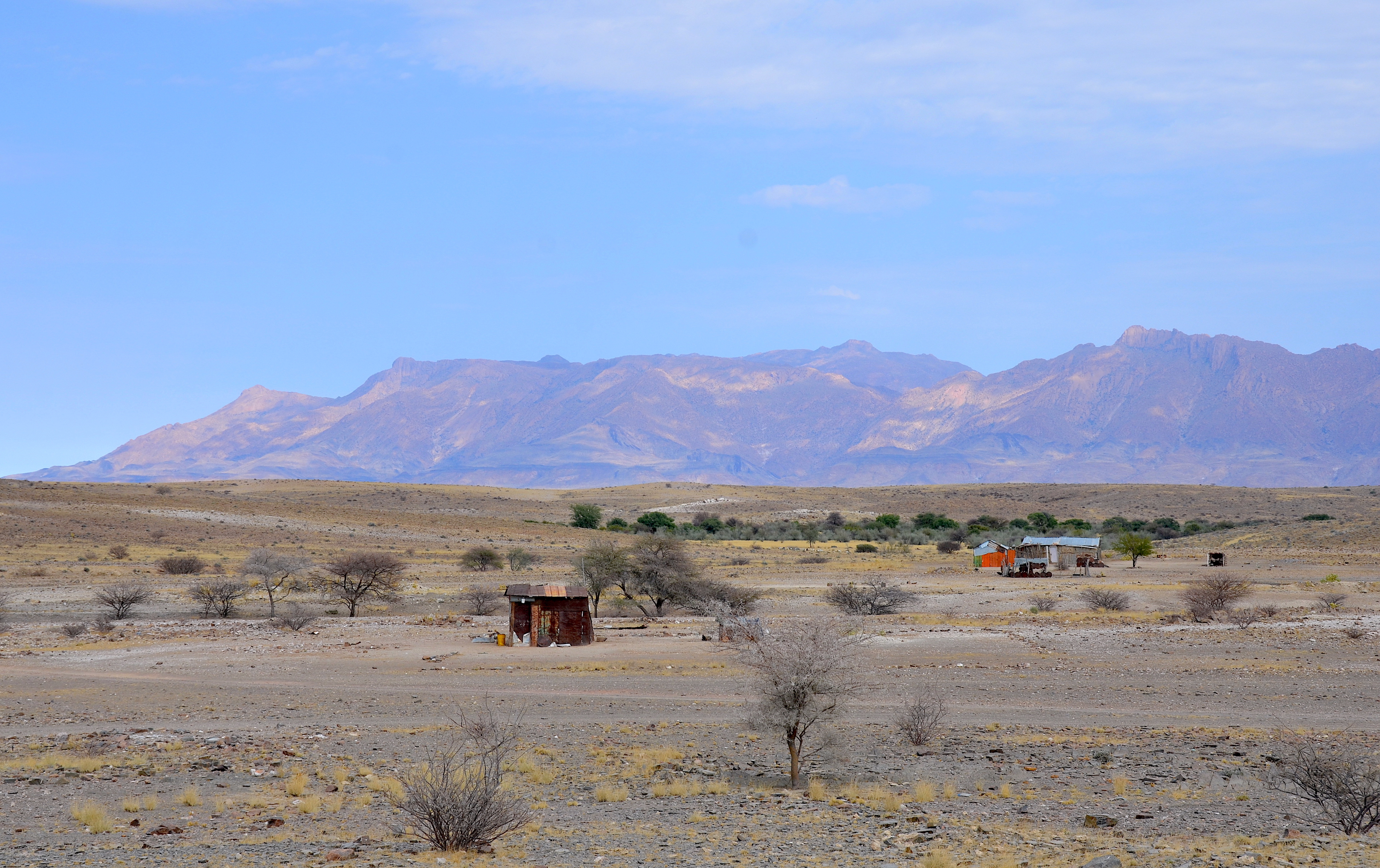
Brandberg Mountain in morning light

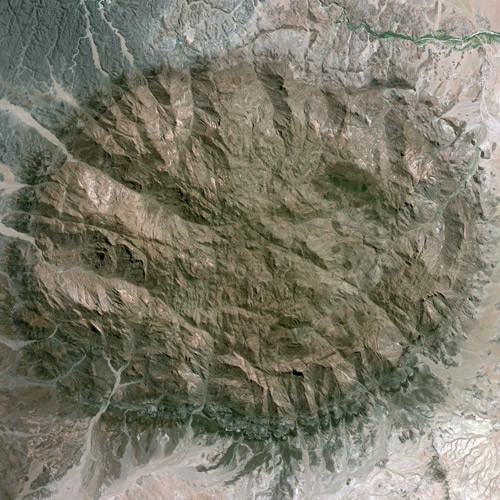
Brandberg Mountain seen from Spot satellite

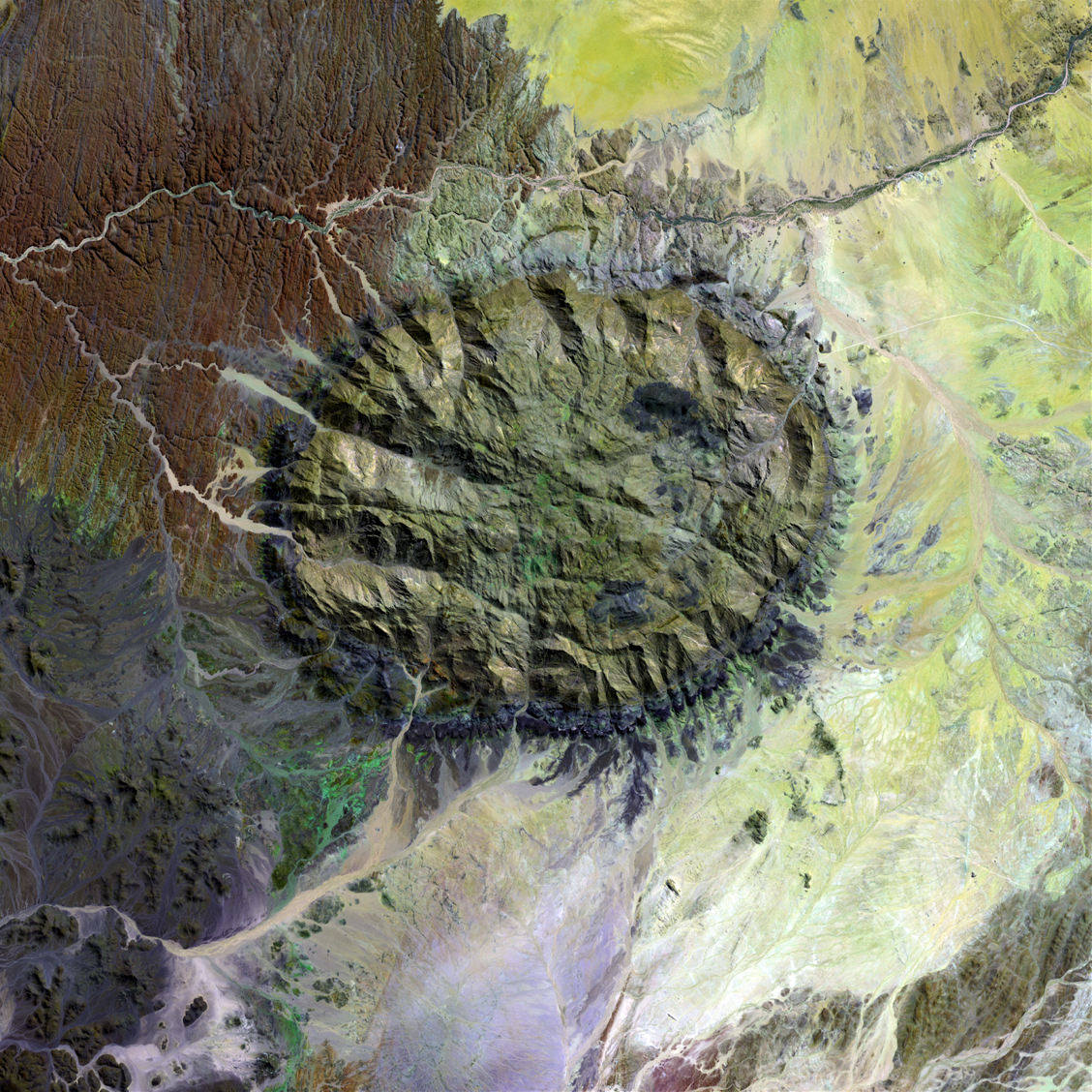
Landsat 7 image of the Brandberg Massif

The Brandberg (Damara: Dâures; Otjiherero: Omukuruvaro) is Namibia's highest mountain.

== Location and extent ==
Brandberg Mountain is located in former Damaraland, now Erongo, in the northwestern Namib Desert, near the coast, and covers an area of approximately 650 km^{2}. With its highest point, the Königstein (German for 'King's Stone'), standing at 2,573 m (8,442 ft) above sea level and located on the flat Namib gravel plains, on a clear day the Brandberg can be seen from a great distance. There are various routes to the summit, the easiest (also steepest) being up the Ga'aseb river valley. Other routes include the Hungurob and Tsisab river valleys. The nearest settlement is Uis, roughly 30 km from the mountain.

The core area of 450 square kilometres (170 sq mi) was declared a National Monument in 1951.

== Origin of name ==
The name Brandberg is Afrikaans, Dutch, and German for Burning Mountain. It refers to its glowing colour, which is sometimes seen in the setting sun. The Damara name for the mountain is Dâures, which means 'burning mountain', while the Herero name, Omukuruvaro, means 'mountain of the Gods'.

== Geology ==
The Brandberg Massif or Brandberg Intrusion is a granitic intrusion, which forms a dome-shaped massif. It originated during the Early Cretaceous rifting that led to the opening of the South Atlantic Ocean. Argon–argon dating yielded intrusive ages of 132 to 130 Ma. The dominant plutonic rock is a homogeneous, medium-grained biotite-hornblende granite. In the western interior of the massif (Naib gorge), a 2-kilometre-diameter body of pyroxene-bearing monzonite is exposed. The youngest intrusive rocks based on cross-cutting relations are arfvedsonite granite dikes and sills in the southwestern periphery of the Brandberg massif which crop out in the Amis valley. The arfvedsonite granites contain minerals rich in rare-earth element minerals such as pyrochlore and bastnaesite. Remnants of Cretaceous volcanic rocks are preserved in a collar along the western and southern margins of the massif. Their angle of dip increases towards the contact where clasts of country rock occur within the granite forming a magmatic breccia. The origins of the magmas that formed the Brandberg intrusion are related to emplacement of mantle-derived basaltic magma during continental break-up which led to partial melting of crustal rocks resulting in a hybrid granitic magma. Erosion subsequently removed the overburden rock. Apatite fission track dating indicates approximately 5 km denudation between 80 and 60 Ma.

An associated feature is the Doros Complex.

== Rock painting ==
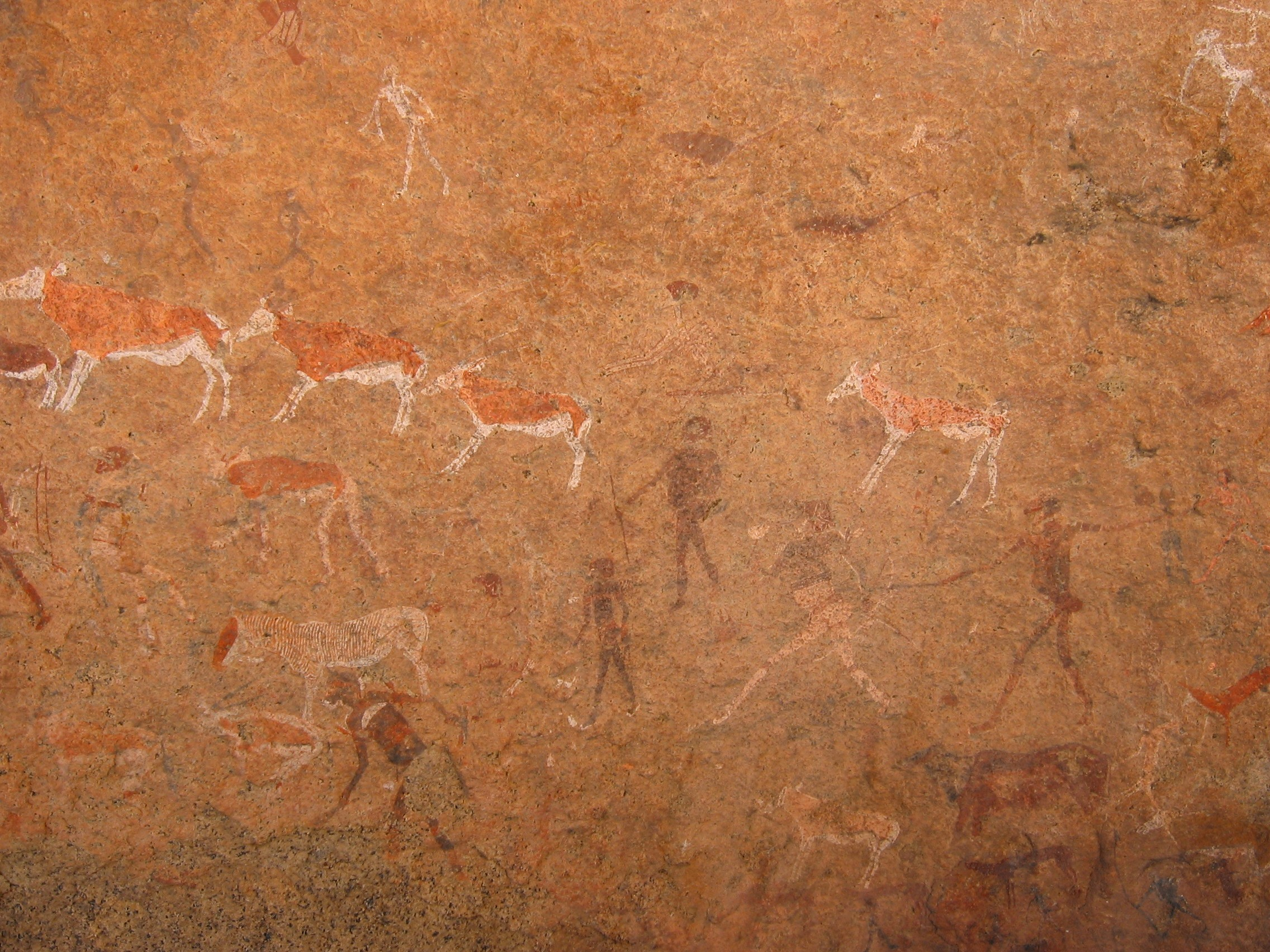
White Lady, Brandberg, Namibia

The Brandberg is a spiritual site of great significance to the San (Bushman) tribes. The main tourist attraction is The White Lady rock painting, located on a rock face with other art work, under a small rock overhang, in the Tsisab Ravine at the foot of the mountain. The ravine contains more than 1000 rock shelters, as well as more than 45000 rock paintings.

To reach The White Lady it is necessary to hike for about 40 minutes over rough terrain, along the ancient watercourses threading through the mountain.

The higher elevations of the mountain contain hundreds of further rock paintings, most of which have been painstakingly documented by Harald Pager, who made tens of thousands of hand copies. Pager's work was posthumously published by the Heinrich Bart Institute, in the six volume series "Rock Paintings of the Upper Brandberg" edited by Tilman Lenssen-Erz. (I. Amis Gorge, II. Hungorob Gorge, III. Southern Gorges (Ga'aseb & Orabes), IV. Umuab & Karoab Gorges, V. Naib (A)and the Northwest, VI. Naib (B), Circus & Dom Gorges. Volume VII. Numas Gorge is unlikely to be published due to discontinued funding.)

== Wildlife ==
The area is uninhabited and wild. It is very arid and finding water can be difficult or impossible. In summer, the temperature frequently rises above 40 °C. Nonetheless, the Brandberg area is home to a large diversity of wildlife. The numbers of animals are small because the environment cannot support large populations. However, most of the desert species that are found in Namibia are present and visitors to the area might glimpse a desert dwelling elephant or a rare black rhino.

The new insect taxon Mantophasmatodea was first discovered on this mountain in 2002.

The scorpion fauna of the Brandberg massif is probably the richest in southern Africa.

== Flora of Namibia ==
The Brandberg is home to some interesting desert flora. Damaraland is well known for its grotesque aloes and euphorbias and the region around the mountain is no exception. The area has many plants and trees that display an alien appearance, due in part to the extreme climatic conditions.

The Brandberg lies within the Karroo-Namib floristic region and some members of the Cape flora are represented. A checklist of 357 species was published in 1974 by Bertil Nordenstam stating that 11 taxa are endemic to the Brandberg, with a further 28 species endemic to the Kaoko element. A large and significant group of species has a disjunction between the Karroo-Namib region in the south, and the arid parts of north-east Africa. These appear to be remnants of a hypothesised arid track joining the two areas.

=== Noteworthy species ===
- Aloidendron dichotomum is the largest and arguably the most conspicuous succulent on the mountain, exceeding 5 metres in height. It is infrequently encountered, mainly on the upper southern slopes.
- Cyphostemma currorii is another large succulent of the grape family that is scattered across the mountain.
- Myrothamnus flabellifolius, sometimes called "the resurrection plant". It is common on some of the upper slopes, and can be made into a tea.
- Olea europaea subsp. africana. Not normally associated with such arid regions, this is only known to be found at the peak of the Königstein.

==== Brandberg endemics ====
- Euphorbia monteiroi subsp. brandbergensis is a toxic upright succulent found in the upper altitudes. It is occasionally browsed, presumably by dassies (rock hyraxes).
- Plumbago wissii has pink flowers.
- Hermannia merxmuelleri was previously only known to be found in the Tsisab valley. It is unusual within the genus in having a crested capsule – much like the American species of Hermannia and Hermannia cristata from the summer-rainfall region of South Africa.
- Othonna brandbergensis discovered by B. Nordenstam on 29 May 1963.
- Hoodia montana
- Mentha wissii
- Ruellia brandbergensis
- Felicia gunellii
- Nidorella nordenstamii
- Pentzia tomentosa
- Scirpus aciformis
- Scirpus hystricoides

== Literature ==
- Detlev Henschel (2013), AFRICA OFF THE ROAD: Four-by-four-, gun-, and hiking-stories from Namibia's boondocks (The Brandberg Massif), Amazon, ISBN 978-3-7375-6100-6
