= Timeline of Windhoek =

The following is a timeline of the history of the city of Windhoek, Namibia.

== Prior to 20th century ==
- 1840s - Nama Orlam chief Jonker Afrikaner names settlement "Winterhoek"
- 1880 - Nama-Herero conflict; settlement sacked.
- 1890 - German military fort construction begins.
- 1892 - Windhoek designated administrative seat of colonial German South West Africa.
- 1898 - German-language Windhoeker Anzeiger newspaper begins publication.

== 20th century ==
=== 1900s ===
- 1901 - Public library founded.
- 1902 - Railway to coast begins operating.
- 1907 - Landesmuseum founded.
- 1909
  - Turnhalle built.
  - Gustav Voigts becomes mayor.

=== 1910s ===
- 1910
  - Christ Church built.
  - Luisen Apotheke (pharmacy) in business.
- 1912
  - Windhoek Railway Station opens.
  - Reiterdenkmal erected (monument to German colonists in the Herero and Namaqua Wars).
- 1913 - Tintenpalast (colonial government building) constructed.
- 1915 - 12 May: Town occupied by South African military during the First World War.
- 1916 - German-language Allgemeine Zeitung (newspaper) begins publication.

=== 1920s ===
- 1920
  - Population: 716.
  - Winterhoek renamed to Windhoek.
- 1924 - Windhoek Synagogue built.
- 1926 - Roman Catholic Apostolic Vicariate of Windhoek active.
- 1927 - Die Suidwes-Afrikaner newspaper begins publication.
- 1928 - Kaiser Street paved.
- 1929 - Windhoek–Gobabis Railway begins operating.

=== 1930s ===
- 1932 - Tintenpalast Gardens laid out.
- 1937 - Bantu Welfare Hall built.

=== 1940s ===
- 1946 - Population: 14,929.

=== 1950s ===
- 1951 - Population: 20,490.
- 1958 - Library/museum/archives building constructed.
- 1959 - 10 December: Ethnic unrest.

=== 1960s ===
- 1960 - Population: 36,049.
- 1961 - Katutura township created.
- 1964 - Black Africa S.C. (football club) formed.
- 1965 - J. G. Strydom Airport opens.
- 1968 - Racially segregated Main Location closes.

=== 1970s ===
- 1971 - Namibian general contract workers strike occurs, starting from Windhoek.
- 1975
  - September: Turnhalle Constitutional Conference begins in Windhoek.
  - Delta Secondary School Windhoek established.
- 1977 - Republikein newspaper begins publication.

=== 1980s ===
- 1981 - Population 96,057

=== 1990s ===
- 1990
  - 21 March: Namibian Independence Day celebrated at Windhoek stadium.
  - Kaiser Street renamed "Independence Avenue" (approximate date).
  - Wernhil Park Mall in business.
  - Sanlam Centre built.
  - National Art Gallery of Namibia and Embassy of Germany established.
- 1991 - Population: 147,056.
- 1992
  - University of Namibia established.
  - New Era newspaper begins publication.
  - Media Institute of Southern Africa headquartered in Windhoek.
- 1994
  - Polytechnic of Namibia founded.
  - National Library of Namibia headquartered in Windhoek.
- 1995
  - May: Miss Universe 1995 beauty pageant held in city.
  - Quba-Mosque (Windhoek) built.
  - Windhoek Country Club Resort in business.
  - National Ministry of Prisons & Correctional Services headquartered in city.

== 21st century ==
=== 2000s ===
- 2000
  - Matheus Shikongo becomes mayor.
  - National Art Gallery of Namibia established.
- 2001 - Population: 233,529.
- 2002 - Heroes' Acre (Namibia) memorial unveiled near city.
- 2005
  - Renaming of Windhoek (as "Otjomuise") proposed.
  - Sam Nujoma Stadium opens.
- 2006 - City police department established.
- 2007
  - Namibian Sun newspaper begins publication.
  - Windhoek Gymnasium Private School established.
- 2008 - January: Airplane crash occurs at Eros Airport.

=== 2010s ===
- 2010 - Old Mutual Namibia building constructed.
- 2011
  - Hilltop Estate construction begins in Kleine Kuppe.
  - Population: 325,858.
- 2014
  - The Grove Mall of Namibia opens.
  - Muesee Kazapua becomes mayor.

== See also ==
- Windhoek history
- List of mayors of Windhoek
- List of government ministries of Namibia, generally headquartered in Windhoek

== Bibliography ==
=== Published in the 20th century ===
- "Windhuk". Deutsches Kolonial-Lexikon (in German). 1920 – via Universitätsbibliothek Frankfurt.
- Carl Schlettwein [in German]; Lisa Gebhardt (1975). "Libraries and Archives in South West Africa". Communications from the Basel Africa Bibliography. 13. ISSN 0170-5091. "Windhoek". via Google Books
- D. Simon (1983). "Evolution of Windhoek 1890–1980". In C. Saunders (ed.). Perspectives on Namibia: Past and present. University of Cape Town.
- David Simon (1991). "Windhoek". In Anthony Lemon (ed.). Homes Apart: South Africa's Segregated Cities. Indiana University Press. ISBN 0-253-33321-0.
- Sylvy Jaglin (1997). "La commercialisation du service d'eau potable à Windhoek (Namibie): inégalités urbaines et logiques marchandes" (PDF). Flux: Cahiers scientifiques internationaux Réseaux et territoires (in French). 13 (30): 16–29. doi:10.3406/flux.1997.1212. ISSN 1958-9557 – via Persee.fr.
- Fatima Friedman (2000), Deconstructing Windhoek: The Urban Morphology of a Post-Apartheid City, Bartlett Development Planning Unit Working Papers, University College London, OCLC 50087639

=== Published in the 21st century ===
- J.B. Gewald (2002). "Diluting drinks and deepening discontent: colonial liquor controls and public resistance in Windhoek, Namibia". In D.F. Bryceson (ed.). Alcohol in Africa: mixing business, pleasure, and politics. Heinemann. hdl:1887/4835.
- M. Wallace (2002), Health, Power and Politics in Windhoek, Namibia, 1915–1945, Basel
- T.J. Desch-Obi (2003). "Windhoek, Namibia". In Paul Tiyambe Zeleza; Dickson Eyoh (eds.). Encyclopedia of Twentieth-Century African History. Routledge. ISBN 0-415-23479-4.
- Christophe Sohn (2004). "A la recherche des frontières dans la ville post-apartheid. Le cas de Windhoek, capitale de la Namibie" [In search of boundaries in the post-apartheid city: the case of Windhoek, capital city of Namibia]. Bulletin de l'Association de géographes français (in French). 81. doi:10.3406/bagf.2004.2413 – via Persee.fr.
- Otto S. Kamwi (2005). An evaluation of the implementation of affirmative action in Windhoek municipality (MPA). University of Namibia – via UNAM Scholarly Repository.
- Fatima Müeller-Friedman (2006). "Beyond the Post-Apartheid City: De/Segregation and Suburbanization in Windhoek, Namibia". African Geographical Review. 25 (1): 33. Bibcode:2006AfrGR..25...33M. doi:10.1080/19376812.2006.9756192. S2CID 145722008.
- Bruce Frayne (2007). "Migration and the Changing Social Economy of Windhoek, Namibia". Development Southern Africa. 24.
- J. B. Gewald (2009). "From the Old Location to Bishops Hill: The Politics of Urban Planning and Landscape History in Windhoek, Namibia". In M. Bollig and O. Bubenzer (ed.). African Landscapes: Interdisciplinary Approaches. Springer. ISBN 978-0387786810.
- Roman A. Cybriwsky (2013). "Windhoek". Capital Cities around the World: An Encyclopedia of Geography, History, and Culture. ABC-CLIO. p. 337+. ISBN 978-1-61069-248-9.
- Henning Melber (2016). "Revisiting the Windhoek Old Location". BAB Working Papers (3). Basler Afrika Bibliographien. ISSN 1422-8769.
- "Mayoral Annual Report 2016". Windhoekcc.org.na. City of Windhoek.
