= Mass media in Namibia =

Mass media in Namibia includes radio, television, and online and print formats.

== Overview ==
Although Namibia's population is fairly small, the country has a diverse choice of media; in 2010, two TV stations, 19 radio stations (without counting community stations), 5 daily newspapers, several weeklies and special publications compete for the attention of the audience. As of 2014, Namibia had 3 television stations, 13 newspapers, and 25 radio stations. Additionally, a mentionable amount of foreign media, especially South African, is available. Online media are mostly based on print publication contents. Namibia has a state-owned Press Agency, called NAMPA. Overall c. 500 journalists work in the country.

Compared to neighbouring countries, Namibia has a large degree of media freedom. Over the past years, the country usually ranked in the upper quarter of the Press Freedom Index of Reporters without Borders, reaching position 21 in 2010, being on par with Canada and the best-positioned African country. The African Media Barometer shows similarly positive results. However, as in other countries, there is still mentionable influence of representatives of state and economy on media in Namibia. In 2009, Namibia dropped to position 36 on the Press Freedom Index. In 2013, it was 19th. In 2014 it ranked 22nd. In 2021, Namibia ranked 24th in the world.

Media and journalists in Namibia are represented by the Namibian chapter of the Media Institute of Southern Africa and the Editors' Forum of Namibia. An independent media ombudsman was appointed in 2009 to prevent a state-controlled media council.

== History ==
The first newspaper in Namibia was the German-language Windhuker Anzeiger, founded 1898 by attorney George Wasserfall. It mainly reported on movements of the German imperial forces, the Schutztruppe. After the establishment of the newspaper the German colonial administration used it as a government gazette.

During German rule, the newspapers mainly reflected the living reality and the view of the white German-speaking minority. The black majority was ignored or depicted as a threat. During South African rule, the white bias continued, with mentionable influence of the Pretoria government on the "South West African" media system. Independent newspapers were seen as a menace to the existing order, critical journalists threatened.

== Publications ==
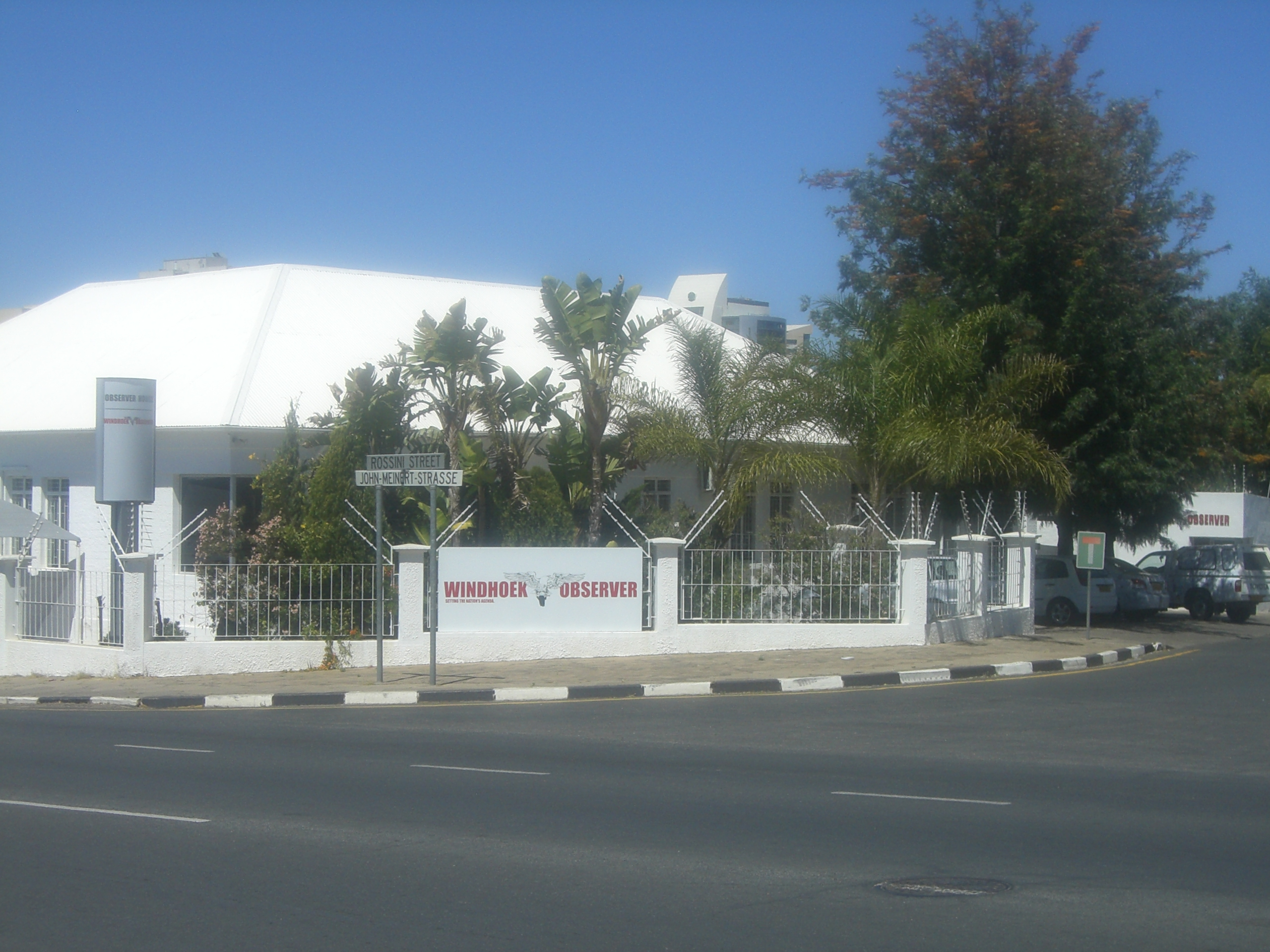
Headquarters of Windhoek Observer newspaper, 2011

Current daily newspapers are the private publications The Namibian (English and other languages), Die Republikein (Afrikaans), Allgemeine Zeitung (German) and Namibian Sun (English) as well as the state-owned New Era (predominantly English). Except for the most widely circulated newspaper, The Namibian, which is owned by a trust, the other mentioned private newspapers are part of the Democratic Media Holdings.

Weekly publications are the tabloid Informanté owned by TrustCo, Windhoek Observer, Namibia Economist, as well as the regional Namib Times. Current affairs magazines include Insight Namibia, Vision2030 Focus magazine and Prime FOCUS. Monthly publications are Sister Namibia magazine, the longest running NGO magazine in Namibia and Namibia Sport, the only national sport magazine. Furthermore, the print market is complemented with party publications, student newspapers and PR publications.

== Radio ==
Radio was introduced in 1969 with Radio Owambo, an FM channel destined for the indigenous Ovambo people. However, people in Namibia already owned short wave radio sets to receive international channels, such that FM radio broadcasts were initially not widely received.

Today the Namibian Broadcasting Corporation (NBC) is the public broadcaster and offers a "National Radio" in English and nine language services in locally spoken languages. The nine private radio stations in the country are mainly English-language channels, except for Kosmos 94.1 (Afrikaans), Radio Omulunga (Oshiwambo) and Hitradio Namibia (German).

Current

- 99FM - Namibia
- Kanaal 7/Channel 7
- Katutura Community Radio
- JACC FM
- NBC
  - NBC National Radio
  - NBC Local Language Radio
- UNAM Radio, University of Namibia
- Radiowave FM
- Fresh FM
- Kosmos FM
- Eagle FM
- Hitradio Namibia (in German)

Defunct

- Voice of Namibia, 1966-1990

== Television ==
Television service in Namibia started in 1981 with rebroadcasts of programs of the South African Broadcasting Corporation (SABC). The service was at least a day late as the cassettes had to be flown in from South Africa, and it was available only in the capital Windhoek. Later TV was also available in Oshakati and in Walvis Bay, and over time local content was added.

Local TV Channels:

- Namibian Broadcasting Corporation
- One Africa Television
- Network Television

== See also ==
- Telecommunications in Namibia
- Communications Regulatory Authority of Namibia
- Namibia Press Agency
- Regional Media Institute of Southern Africa, headquartered in Windhoek, Namibia
- Windhoek Declaration of press freedom, 1991
- Media of South Africa, some consumed in Namibia
- One Economy Foundation Media Summit and Awards
- Editors' Forum of Namibia Journalism Awards

== Bibliography ==
- William Heuva (2001). Media and Resistance Politics: The Alternative Press in Namibia, 1960-1990. Basler Afrika Bibliographien. Basel: P. Schlettwein. ISBN 978-3-908193-10-4.
- Carsten von Nahmen (2001). Deutschsprachige Medien in Namibia: vom Windhoeker Anzeiger zum Deutschen Hörfunkprogramm der Namibian Broadcasting Corporation, 1898-1998 (in German). Windhoek: Namibia Wissenschaftliche Gesellschaft. ISBN 999164024X.
- "Namibia: Directory: the Press". Africa South of the Sahara 2003. Regional Surveys of the World. Europa Publications. 2003. p. 744+. ISBN 9781857431315. ISSN 0065-3896. (Includes broadcasting)
- Martin Buch Larsen (2007). Media environment in Namibia, 1990-2007. Windhoek: Media Institute of Southern Africa. ISBN 9789994568239.
- Andreas Rothe (2011). Media System and News Selections in Namibia. Münster: LIT Verlag. ISBN 9783643111944.
- Toyin Falola; Daniel Jean-Jacques, eds. (2015). "Namibia: Media". Africa: an Encyclopedia of Culture and Society. ABC-CLIO. p. 909. ISBN 978-1-59884-666-9.
- "Namibia", Freedom of the Press, USA: Freedom House, 2015, OCLC 57509361
