= List of newspapers in Namibia =

Below is a list of newspapers published in Namibia, along with their status of public or private and their primary language of publication.

== Daily newspapers ==
| Newspaper | Circulation | First issued | Languages | Ownership | Website |
|---|---|---|---|---|---|
| The Namibian | 40,000 (2010) | 1985 | English, Oshiwambo | Free Press of Namibia | www.namibian.com.na |
| Namibian Sun | 36,000 (2007, planned) | 2007 | English | Namibia Media Holdings | namibiansun.com |
| Republikein | 18,000 | 1977 | Afrikaans, English | Namibia Media Holdings | www.republikein.com.na |
| New Era | 9,000 (Mon–Thu); 11,000 (Fri) (2007) | 1992 | English, Oshiwambo, Khoekhoe, Otjiherero, siLozi | Government of Namibia | www.newera.com.na |
| Allgemeine Zeitung | 4,000 (2020) | 1916 | German | Namibia Media Holdings | www.az.com.na |

== Weekly, bi-weekly, or monthly newspapers ==
=== National ===
- Insight Namibia, private, English
- Namibia Economist, private, English, since 2016 only online
- Omutumwa, private, Oshiwambo
- Oshili24, private, English
- The Villager, private, English, since 2018 only online
- Windhoek Observer, private, English

=== Regional ===
- Buchter News, Lüderitz, private, English
- The Caprivi Vision, Zambezi Region, private, English/siLozi
- Namib Times, Erongo Region, private, English/Afrikaans

== Historic newspapers ==
- Namibia Today, private, mouthpiece of the SWAPO party, English. Currently dormant.

== See also ==
- Mass media in Namibia
