= One Economy Foundation Media Summit and Awards =

The One Economy Foundation Media Summit and Awards is an annual journalism event in Windhoek, Namibia. It began in 2024 and covers reporting on gender-based violence, femicide, sexual and reproductive health and mental health. Awards are given for print, radio, television and digital media.

The event is organised by the One Economy Foundation. It was established in 2016 by Monica Geingos, then First Lady of Namibia.

== History ==
The foundation's work has included sexual and reproductive health, mental health and gender-based violence. The United Nations Population Fund said it had supported the organisation since 2016.

The first summit was held in Windhoek on 19 January 2024. About 50 media practitioners attended. Tlaleng Mofokeng, then a United Nations Special Rapporteur, spoke on human rights and journalism. Gwen Lister also addressed the summit.

The second summit was held in March 2025. Josina Z. Machel gave the keynote address. Sessions covered reporting on survivors, mental health and the use of artificial intelligence in journalism.

The third summit was held in May 2026. Speakers discussed language, images and survivor-centred reporting. The programme also covered privacy, stigma and the risk of further harm in news reports.

== Awards and fellowship ==
The first #BreakFree Media Awards were presented in 2024. Categories covered print, radio, television and digital media.

NBC journalists Gordon Joseph and Maria Kaalushu won the television category. Vitalio Angula won the radio category. Other recipients worked for the Namibian Sun, New Era, The Namibian and One Africa Television.

The 2025 awards received 90 entries from 35 media practitioners. Shelleygan Petersen won the print category. Tracy Tafirenyika was runner-up. Charlotte Nambadja won radio, Shaun Adams digital media and Selima Henock television.

The 2026 awards also covered child protection. Categories included television, radio, multimedia and newcomers. Emil Seibeb won the television category. Isai Sipunga of New Era was named Journalist of the Year.

The programme also includes journalism fellowships. Four journalists had completed six-month placements by 2025. A further group began placements in 2026. Participating organisations included the Namibia Press Agency, Namibian Broadcasting Corporation and The Namibian.
