= Fransina Kahungu =

Namibian politician

Fransina Ndateelela Kahungu (born 1970) is a Namibian politician serving as a Windhoek city councilor. She previously served as deputy mayor of Windhoek in 2016 and 2017 and mayor of Windhoek from 2019 to 2020. Kahungu became the SWAPO Party Women Council (SPWC) Secretary in 2022.

== Early life and education ==
Kahungu hails from the village of Okapanda. She moved to Windhoek in 1994 in pursuit of a diploma in education at the University of Namibia. As a student at Ombalantu Senior Secondary School, Kahungu became involved in politics as a member of the Namibia National Students Organisation. From 1998 to 2017, Kahungu worked first as a teacher and then an administrator at Olof Palme Primary School, located in the Windhoek suburb of Greenwell Matongo.

== Political career ==
Kahungu was first elected as a member of the Windhoek City Council in 2010 and became the Deputy Secretary of the SPWC in 2016. While on the city council, she served as Deputy Mayor of Windhoek in 2016 and 2017.

She was elected as mayor of the city on 13 December 2019, after the incumbent mayor Muesee Kazapua was absent for the municipality's internal elections. According to a report by the Namibia Press Agency, Kazapua and city spokesperson Harold Akwenye both asserted that the city's leadership had not changed, and that Kazapua was still mayor of the city. Agatha Ashilelo, the chair of the City of Windhoek management committee, stated that Kahungu had replaced Kazapua as mayor according to a decision made by the SWAPO Regional Executive Committee.

In January 2020, the Namibia Economist and the Namibian Broadcasting Corporation reported that the Office of the Mayor announced its relocation from central Windhoek to a community centre located in the informal settlement of Babylon, while the Office of the Deputy Mayor was to remain in the original location. The arrangement was set to remain for the duration of Kahungu's term as mayor.

On 2 December 2020, Job Amupanda was elected mayor after the opposition voted in his favour. Kahungu succeeded Eunice Iipinge as the SWAPO Party Women Council (SPWC) Secretary in February 2022.
