= Toivo Ndjebela =

- Education: University of Namibia, University of Helsinki
- Occupations: Journalist, editor
- Years active: 2006– present
- Title: Namibian Sun, editor-in-chief
- Website: https://www.namibiansun.com/

Toivo Ndjebela is a Namibian journalist and the editor-in-chief of the Namibian Sun daily. He also worked as managing editor of the state-owned New Era newspaper.

== Education ==
Ndjebela holds a bachelor's degree in media studies from the University of Namibia (2006) and a master's degree in foreign reporting from the University of Helsinki (2007). He also obtained a Masters in Development Study and Policy in 2018 from the Graduate School of Development Policy and Practice (GSDPP), University of Cape Town.

== Career ==
He has worked as a deputy news editor at the state-owned newspaper New Era, a reporter at the tabloid newspaper Informanté, and as a senior journalist at the Windhoek Observer. He was appointed as the editor of the Namibian Sun in May 2012. Ndjebela returned to New Era in 2014, and again to the Namibian Sun, as editor-in-chief, in 2019. In 2021, he along with veteran journalist and editor Gwen Lister, was acknowledged as champion of world press freedom.
