= Sonja Smith =

Namibian investigative journalist

Sonja Ndahafa Smith
- Born: Namibia
- Occupation: Investigative journalist
- Years active: 2013–present
- Known for: Investigative journalism

Sonja Ndahafa Smith is a Namibian investigative journalist. She is best known as a two-time recipient of the Editors' Forum of Namibia Journalist of the Year award, having received the distinction in 2021 and 2024.

== Journalism career ==
In October 2014, Smith joined the newspaper, Confidentè where she reported on news leads, as well as human interest features and court stories. Smith also focused on the unfolding Caprivi treason trial.

In October 2015, Smith joined the Windhoek Observer where she focused on politics, human interest, and immersed herself in investigations.

While at The Namibian, she produced investigative and public-interest reporting on governance, corruption, public finance, human rights and social issues. Her work included collaborative investigations into labour conditions in Namibia's agricultural sector and access to sanitation with the Center for Collaborative Investigative Journalism (CCIJ).

She has worked as a correspondent for the Associated Press since 2019.

== Awards and recognition ==
Smith has received national and international recognition for her investigative and public-interest reporting.

- 2021: Journalist of the Year at the Editors' Forum of Namibia Journalism Awards. Her investigation, Grape Crops Bring in Millions, Farm Workers Live a Harsh Life, also received the Best Agriculture and Environmental Story award.
- 2023: First place in the print category at the Merck Foundation Africa Media Recognition Awards for her reporting on infertility and reproductive health in Namibia.; Finalist in the Institute for Nonprofit News Awards for collaborative reporting on Namibia's sanitation crisis.
- 2024: Journalist of the Year at the Editors' Forum of Namibia Journalism Awards, sharing the distinction with Freddie Clayton and Margaret Courtney-Clarke.; Education, Health and Social Development award for the investigation Depo-Provera: The Drug That Divides Women, alongside Petrus Muronga.
- 2025: World Press Institute Fellowship. Smith was the first Namibian journalist to participate in the programme's 60-year history, and was subsequentally named a Harry Morgan Fellow.
- 2026: Extractive Industries and Energy Journalism Award at the Editors' Forum of Namibia Journalism Awards for Deals, Dollars & Dirty Oil: Unpacking Namcor's Corruption Saga.

== Politics ==
Smith worked as the personal assistant and researcher for politician and president of the Popular Democratic Movement, McHenry Venaani. In 2024, Venaani nominated Smith for parliamentarian. The nomination was criticized by the Namibia Media Professionals Union and some members of the Popular Democratic Movement. When the party won only five seats in the 2024 Namibian general election, Smith, listed as number 11, returned to journalism.
