= Tracy Tafirenyika =

Namibian investigative journalist

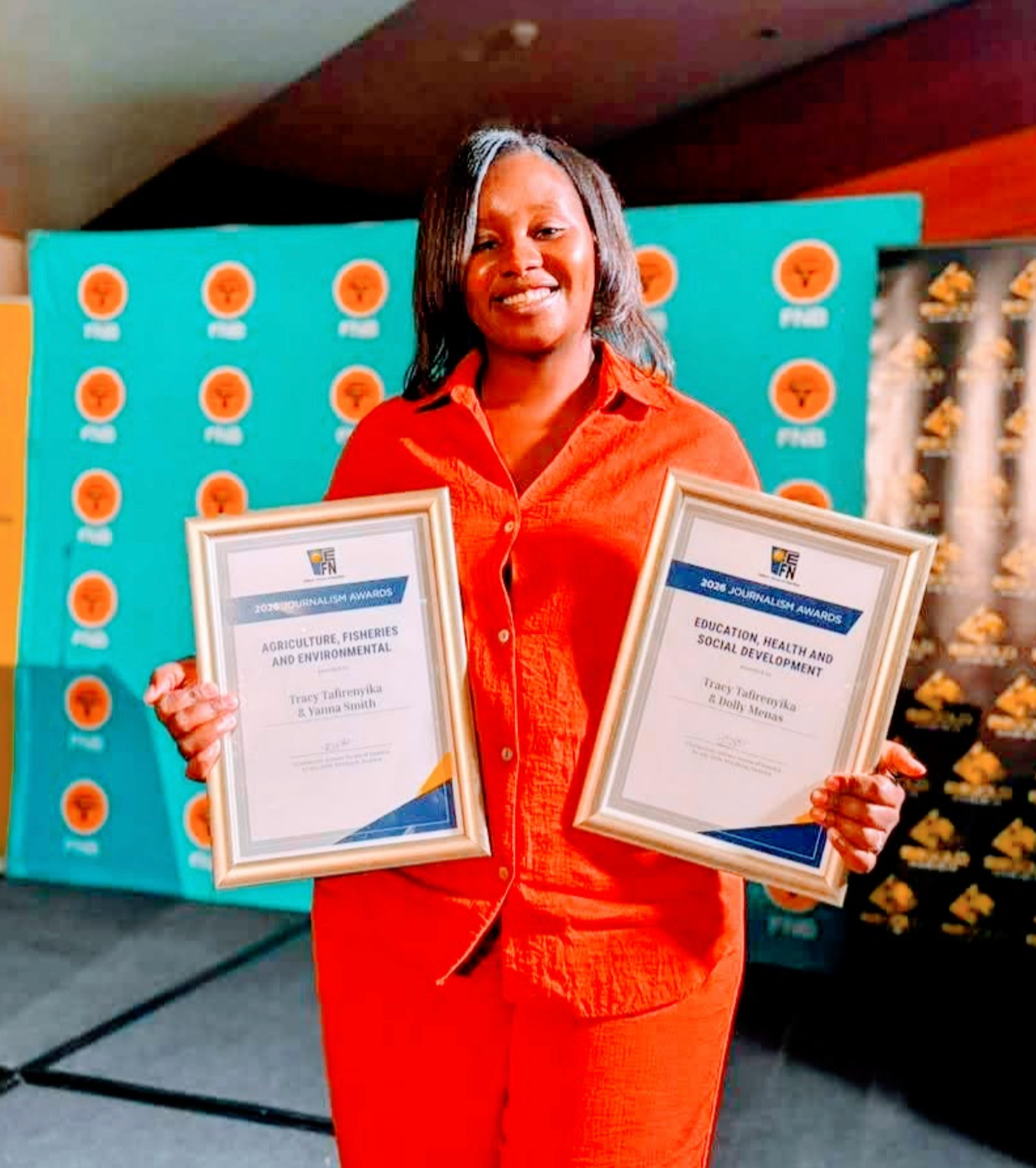
- Tafirenyika in 2026
- Occupation: Journalist
- Employer: The Namibian
- Awards: Editors' Forum of Namibia Journalism Awards (2026); One Economy Foundation Media Summit and Awards (2025, runner-up)

Tracy Tafirenyika is a Zimbabwe born journalist based in Namibia. She works for The Namibian and has reported on social issues, mining, public accountability and the treatment of vulnerable communities. Her reporting received two awards at the 2026 Editors' Forum of Namibia Journalism Awards. Her journalism has also been independently covered by international press freedom organizations.

== Career ==
Tafirenyika is a reporter with The Namibian Investigative unit. Her work has covered mining communities, social issues and public accountability. Her public accountability reporting has also received wider attention. The Committee to Protect Journalists reported on threats and online abuse directed at Tafirenyika following her reporting on government minister James Sankwasa.

Her reporting from Uis has examined the effects of mining on local communities. Her report We see trucks, not jobs: Uis residents feel left behind in global energy rush was named first runner-up in the mining and energy category at the 2024 Editors' Forum of Namibia Journalism Awards.

== Awards ==
Tafirenyika was first runner-up in the mining and energy category at the Editors' Forum of Namibia Journalism Awards for her reporting from Uis. She was placed second in the print category at the One Economy Foundation Media Summit and Awards for her investigation into the online sexual exploitation of children. At the Editors' Forum of Namibia Journalism Awards 2026, Tafirenyika and Yanna Smith received the Agriculture, Fisheries and Environmental Journalism award. Tafirenyika and Dolly Menas also received the Education, Health and Social Development Journalism award.

== Scholarly reception ==
Tafirenyika's journalism has also been used for teaching and academic study. Brian Semujju, then a senior lecturer in journalism and communication at Makerere University, analysed her public work in a 2025 political economy case study used for teaching. Her reporting was also studied by political scientist Henning Melber in a 2025 study of populism, elections and the media in Namibia.
