= 1990 Berlin state election =

Berlin election

- 2 December 1990

All 241 seats of the Abgeordnetenhaus of Berlin 121 seats needed for a majority
- Turnout: 2,019,198 (80.8%)
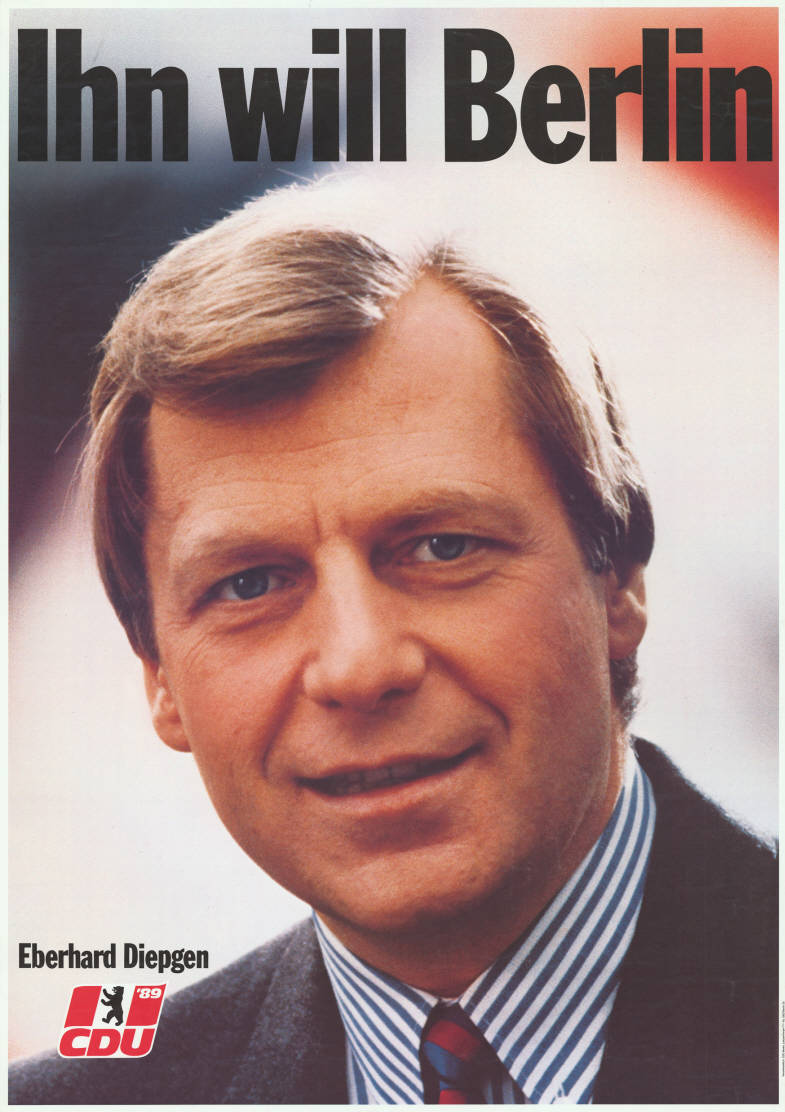

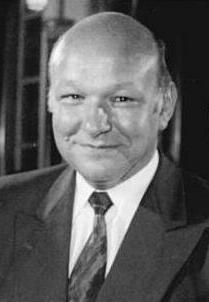
	First party	Second party	Third party
Leader	Eberhard Diepgen	Walter Momper
Party	CDU	SPD	PDS
Seats won	101	76	23
Popular vote	815,382	614,075	184,820
Percentage	40.4%	30.4%	9.2%
	Fourth party	Fifth party	Sixth party
Party	FDP	Greens (West)	Greens (East) (Note: A linked list of the Alliance 90, East German Green Party, and Independent Women's Association.)
Seats won	18	12	11
Popular vote	143,080	100,839	87,891
Percentage	7.1%	5.0%	4.4% (Note: In the 1990 election, the 5% electoral threshold was applied separately in East Berlin and West Berlin. The Alliance 90–Eastern Greens-UFV grouping won 11.4% of votes in East Berlin.)
- Results for single-member constituencies.
Mayor before election
Walter Momper (West)
Tino Schwierzina/Thomas Krüger (East)
Elected Mayor
Eberhard Diepgen
CDU

The 1990 Berlin state election was held on 2 December 1990 to elect the members of the 12th Abgeordnetenhaus of Berlin. This was the first election held in Berlin after the reunification of Germany and Berlin, and was held on the same day as the 1990 federal election.

The Christian Democratic Union (CDU) emerged as the largest party with 40.4%, with the Social Democratic Party (SPD) second on 30.4%. The Party of Democratic Socialism (PDS) won 9.2%, while the Free Democratic Party (FDP) won 7.1%. Two green parties, the Alternative List from the West and the Alliance 90 from the East, entered the Abgeordnetenhaus with 5.0% and 4.4% respectively. The 5% electoral threshold for entry was applied separately in the old West and East of the city, allowing both parties to enter despite both falling short of 5% statewide. They subsequently formed a joint parliamentary group, and later merged to become the Berlin branch of Alliance 90/The Greens.

A potential CDU–FDP government came up two seats short of a majority, and no left-of-centre arrangement was possible due to the presence of PDS. Thus, the CDU and SPD entered into a grand coalition, and CDU leader and former Mayor Eberhard Diepgen was elected as the first Mayor of reunified Berlin.

== Parties ==
The table below lists the parties and groupings competing in the election which were represented in the 11th Abgeordnetenhaus of West Berlin (elected in 1989) and the last city council of East Berlin (elected in May 1990). Parties are listed in order of the number of seats they held in both city legislatures.

Name		Ideology	Leader(s)	1989 result (West)		1990 result (East)	
Name		Ideology	Leader(s)	Votes (%)	Seats	Votes (%)	Seats
SPD	Social Democratic Party of Germany; Sozialdemokratische Partei Deutschlands	Social democracy	Walter Momper	37.3%	55 / 138	34.1% (Note: Results for the Social Democratic Party in the GDR, which merged with the Western SPD in 1990.)	47 / 138
CDU	Christian Democratic Union of Germany; Christlich Demokratische Union Deutschlands	Christian democracy	Eberhard Diepgen	37.7%	55 / 138	18.4% (Note: Results for the CDU (17.7%, 24 seats) and DA (0.6%, 1 seat). The two parties merged with the Western CDU in 1990.)	25 / 138
PDS	Party of Democratic Socialism; Partei des Demokratischen Sozialismus	Democratic socialism		N/A		30.1%	42 / 138
Bü90/Grüne/UFV	Alliance 90/Green/UFV; Bündnis 90/Grüne/UFV	Green politics		N/A		12.6% (Note: Results for Alliance 90 (9.9%, 14 seats) and the Green Party (2.7%, 4 seats).)	18 / 138
Grüne/AL	Green/Alternative List; Grüne/Alternativen Liste	Green politics		11.8%	17 / 138	N/A	
REP	The Republicans; Die Republikaner	National conservatism		7.5%	11 / 138	N/A	
FDP	Free Democratic Party; Freie Demokratische Partei	Classical liberalism		3.9%	0 / 138	2.3% (Note: Results for the Association of Free Democrats (1.2%, 2 seats) and FDP (1.0%, 1 seat). The two parties merged with the Western FDP in 1990.)	3 / 138
DSU	German Social Union; Deutsche Soziale Union	National conservatism		N/A		1.0%	2 / 138

== Election result ==
Summary of the 2 December 1990 election results for the Abgeordnetenhaus of Berlin
Party	Votes	%	Seats
Christian Democratic Union (CDU)	815,382	40.38	101
Social Democratic Party (SPD)	614,075	30.41	76
Party of Democratic Socialism (PDS)	184,820	9.15	23
Free Democratic Party (FDP)	143,080	7.09	18
Green/Alternative List (Grüne/AL)	100,839	4.99	12
Alliance 90/Green/VFU (Bü90/Grüne/UFV)	87,891	4.35	11
The Republicans (REP)	62,041	3.07	0
Ecological Democratic Party (ÖDP)	5,160	0.26	0
German Social Union (DSU)	4,539	0.22	0
League of German Democrats (DDD)	1,371	0.07	0
Total	2,019,198	100.00	241

Popular Vote
CDU	40.38%
SPD	30.41%
PDS	9.15%
FDP	7.09%
AL	4.99%
BÜ90	4.35%
REP	3.07%
Other	0.55%

Abgeordnetenhaus seats
CDU	41.91%
SPD	31.54%
PDS	9.54%
FDP	7.47%
AL	4.98%
BÜ90	4.56%

	SPD	CDU/CSU	PDS	Grüne	FDP	REP	Others
West Berlin	29.5	49.0	1.1	8.2	7.9	3.7	0.6
East Berlin	32.1	25.0	23.6	11.4	5.6	1.9	0.4
