= Gawanas =

Gawanas is a surname. Notable people with the surname include:

- Bience Gawanas (born 1956), Namibian lawyer
- Sade Gawanas, Namibian politician
