= Kazapua =

Kazapua is a surname. Notable people with the surname include:

- Lloyd Kazapua (born 1989), Namibian footballer
- Muesee Kazapua (born 1980), Namibian politician
