= Network Media Hub =

Publishing house in Windhoek, Namibia

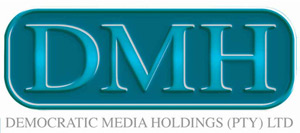
- Industry: Publishing
- Founded: 1992; 34 years ago
- Founder: Dirk Mudge
- Headquarters: Windhoek, Namibia
- Key people: Albe Botha (CEO); Peter Laubscher (Chairperson of the Board)
- Products: Print media Printing works Network Radio station TV Channel DStv285 or GoTv25
- Owner: Stimulus Investments (100%)
- Website: nmh.com.na

Network Media Hub, (NMH), formerly Namibia Media Holdings and Democratic Media Holdings (DMH) is a publishing house in Namibia. Founded in 1992, it publishes three major Namibian newspapers, the Afrikaans-language Republikein, the German Allgemeine Zeitung, and the Namibian Sun in English. It also runs the Print Media Hub printing works, and the television channel DStv285 and GoTv25.

== History ==
NMH developed from the Republikein Group, the publishing house of the Republikein, Namibia's only daily in Afrikaans founded in 1977 by Dirk Mudge. In August 1991 the Group bought and incorporated the publisher John Meinert Printing which in turn owned the Deutscher Verlag, the publisher of the German-language daily Allgemeine Zeitung, and also published the weekly Windhoek Advertiser. It further founded its own printing works, Newsprint Namibia. The rights to John Meinert Printing were sold in 1999.

Namibia Media Holdings was founded as Democratic Media Holdings (Pty) Ltd in 1992 by a trust established for this purpose, the Democratic Media Trust of Namibia. In 2014 it was renamed Namibia Media Holdings.

== Products and ownership ==
The company publishes three major Namibian newspapers. The Afrikaans-language Republikein was incorporated into NMH at its inception. The German Allgemeine Zeitung, published since 1916 and the oldest German daily in Africa, was bought by the publishing house John Meinert in 1934, which in turn was sold to NMH in 1991. The Namibian Sun, a weekly newspaper established in 2007 and a daily since 2010, is a tabloid launched to "attract young readers".

With the acquisition of John Meinert, Namibia Media Holdings also obtained Namibia's only large printing works. The Namibian, New Era and Namibia Today, were all printed at NMH. The radio station 99FM was obtained in 2007 and sold later. With interests in three major newspapers, ownership of the printing press and stakes in radio, Robin Tyson argued in 2008 that NMH was "dominant [...] in the Namibian media market". During that time the publishing and printing industry diversified somewhat. Free Press Printers, owned by Trustco, was established in 2006 and prints The Namibian as well as the weekly tabloid Informante.

NMH is owned by Stimulus Investments, a Namibian investment company. Stimulus holds 50% via its subsidiary Desert Trade Investments (Pty) Ltd, and the other 50% directly after buying it from the South African media publisher Media24.

In April 2024, Namibia Media Holdings announced its rebranding to Network Media Hub.
