= Editors' Forum of Namibia Journalism Awards =

The Editors' Forum of Namibia Journalism Awards are journalism awards in Namibia organised by the Editors' Forum of Namibia (EFN). The current awards were launched in 2019, eight years after the previous national media awards were last held. The awards recognise work across areas including investigative journalism, business, public affairs, health, environmental journalism, sport and visual journalism.

== History ==
The Editors' Forum of Namibia announced the return of national journalism awards in July 2019. The previous awards had been organised under the Media Institute of Southern Africa and were last held in 2010. The first EFN awards included ten categories. Nomhle Kangootui was named Journalist of the Year.

The next ceremony was held in 2021. More than 130 entries were submitted by over 40 entrants. Sonja Smith received the Journalist of the Year award.

President Hage Geingob attended the ceremony in 2023 where the awards received 169 entries from 59 journalists. The event included a keynote by South African investigative journalist Jacques Pauw. A video call talk with historian Yuval Noah Harariregarding the implications of artificial intelligence on media was also conducted. Sonja Smith, Margaret Courtney-Clarke and Freddie Clayton shared the Journalist of the 2024 Year award.

== Prize money controversy ==
The Namibian reported that several winners from the 2024 awards had received less prize money than stated in the official competition entry forms. Three journalists said they had received less than half of the advertised amount. The Editors' Forum later said the payments had been reduced because of financial constraints and a lack of sponsorship.

== Changes to the awards ==
The Editors' Forum announced changes to the timing of the awards in 2025, saying future ceremonies would be aligned more closely with World Press Freedom Day. The First National Bank Namibia in 2026 provided N$250,000 in sponsorship for the awards. It was announced only journalists working for EFN member media organisations would be eligible to enter.
