= John Meinert Printing =

Publishing house in Windhoek, Namibia

- Industry: Publishing
- Founded: 1917
- Founder: John Meinert
- Defunct: 1991
- Fate: incorporated into Namibia Media Holdings
- Headquarters: Windhoek, Namibia
- Products: Printing works
- Owner: John Meinert (from 1917); Diether Lauenstein (until 1991)

John Meinert Printing (Pty) Ltd was a publishing house in Namibia, named after its founder John Meinert, businessman and later mayor of Windhoek. It owned the country's only large printing works. In 1991 the business was sold to Namibia Media Holdings.

The publishing house was founded as Windhuker Druckerei in German South West Africa. John Meinert entered as managing director in 1913 and bought the business in 1917. John Meinert Printing owned the publishing house Deutscher Verlag, the publisher of the German-language daily Allgemeine Zeitung. Later, the weekly Windhoek Advertiser was launched. It also ran Namibia's only large printing works. All major Namibian newspapers were printed at John Meinert.

In 1991 the company was incorporated into Democratic Media Holdings (today Namibia Media Holdings) which founded its own printing works (Newsprint Namibia) one year later. The rights to the name were sold in 1999; the current John Meinert Printing company in Windhoek is otherwise unrelated to the entity that owned Namibia's printing works.
