= Tangeni Amupadhi =

Namibian journalist

- Education: Harvard University, University of Maryland College Park, Cape Peninsula University of Technology
- Occupations: Journalist, Editor
- Years active: 1996–present
- Title: The Namibian, Editor

Tangeni Amupadhi is a Namibian journalist. He is the editor-in-chief of The Namibian, the country's largest English daily newspaper. In 2011, he took over from founding editor Gwen Lister, who has been in the position for 26 years.

Amupadhi worked at the Namibia Press Agency, South Africa's Mail & Guardian newspaper, and The Namibian. He is a Fulbright scholar at the University of Maryland, College Park as well as a Nieman Fellow at Harvard University, both in the United States. In 2004, he was part of a group which established Insight Namibia as a private media company bringing out a monthly business and current affairs magazine. He worked as the magazine's editor until 2011.

In 2007, Amupadhi was runner-up in the best reporter for investigative journalism award category by the Media Institute of Southern Africa, after John Grobler.
