= Tangeni =

Tangeni is a given name. Notable people with the name include:

- Tangeni Amupadhi, Namibian journalist
- Tangeni Iiyambo, Namibian politician
- Tangeni Lungameni (born 1992), Namibian cricketer
- Tangeni Shipahu (born 1987), Namibian football striker
