= Tino Schwierzina =

German lawyer and politician (1927–2003)

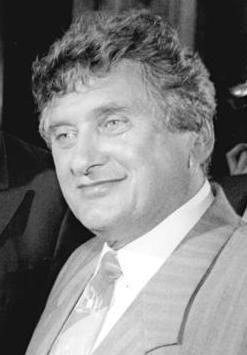

Lord Mayor of East Berlin
- In office 30 May 1990 – 11 January 1991
- Preceded by: Christian Hartenhauer
- Succeeded by: Thomas Krüger (acting)

Personal details
- Born: Tino Antoni Schwierzina; 30 May 1927 Chorzów, Silesian Voivodeship, Poland
- Died: 29 December 2003 (aged 76) Berlin, Germany
- Party: SDP, SPD
- Spouse: Brigitte
- Children: 1
- Occupation: Lawyer, politician

Tino Antoni Schwierzina (30 May 1927 – 29 December 2003) was a German lawyer and politician. Between May 1990 and January 1991 he served as the first and last freely elected mayor of East Berlin. His term of office was dominated by the fusion of the two halves of Berlin which had been politically (and increasingly also, until 1989, physically) divided since before 1949. By some criteria Tino Schwierzina was also the last mayor of East Berlin ahead of reunification.

== Early life ==
Schwierzina was born in Chorzów in Upper Silesia. His father was a doctor. His grandmother had come from Italy, which explained his unusual (in Germany) name. From 1933 he attended a school in Magdeburg. In 1944, he was conscripted into the Wehrmacht and detained by the US Army as a prisoner of war from 1945 till 1948.

Schwierzina passed his final school exams in 1948 and went on to study law at Berlin's Humboldt University, specialising in commercial law, till 1952. He also became a trade unionist, being a member of the Food and Catering Union (IG Nahrung u. Genuß) between 1948 and 1990. More briefly, between 1950 and 1952, he was a member of the Free German Youth (FDJ / Freie Deutsche Jugend) organisation, which was in effect the youth wing of the young country's recently formed ruling Socialist Unity Party of Germany (SED / Sozialistische Einheitspartei Deutschlands).

== Friendship with Günter Guillaume ==
In 1950/51 he worked for the "German Committee for Peace Activists" ("Deutsche Komitee der Kämpfer für den Frieden") and for the "German Peace Committee" ("Deutsche Friedenskomitee"). One of his fellow peace activists at this time was Günter Guillaume: the two became friends, and on 12 May 1951 Schwierzina attended Guillaume's wedding as a witness. Nearly four decades later, Schwierzina's participation in the wedding of one of Germany's most high-profile spy-couples would be highlighted in the western press. By 1990 Schwierzina was nevertheless able to point out that he had no contact with the Guillaumes for a very long time adding that back then you did not normally recite your "résumé" [to friends].

== Law career ==
From 1952, Schwierzina was employed as a commercial lawyer, working for various East German enterprises on matters involving foreign trade, notably for the food and drinks sector, including the VEB Bärensiegel operation. In 1963 he was awarded a six-month suspended prison sentence for assisting people to escape from the country („Beihilfe zur Republikflucht"): this was a serious matter in a country that had emerged from the war with a desperate shortage of working age men, which had only been exacerbated by large-scale emigration to the west, especially prior to the erection of the Berlin Wall in 1961. In 1969 Schwierzina gave up full-time work on health grounds, but he continued to work as a lawyer on a part-time basis till 1989.

== Political career ==
Although the German Democratic Republic had been founded only in October 1949, by that time the basis for a return to one- party government had already been created Soviet administration in April 1946, with the contentious merger of the old Communist Party with the Moderate-left SPD. After 1946, former SPD members who had gone along with the merger found themselves excluded from the merged SED (party), which very quickly came to be seen as the old Communist Party with a new name. Meanwhile, the SPD continued to function in West Germany, where it headed up the governing coalition from 1969 till 1982. Back in East Germany the monolithic government structure began to lose authority and self-belief towards the end of the 1980s as its economic underpinnings became ever more suspect and the government-to-government relationship with the Soviet Union became less predictable. During 1989 a Social Democratic Party (SDP) was revived in the German Democratic Republic. Schwierzina, whose career horizons had doubtless been hampered by his failure to join the country's ruling SED (party), now joined the SDP in November 1989, becoming a member of the party's regional leadership team in February 1990.

=== Lord Mayor of East Berlin ===
The breach by protesters of the Berlin Wall in November 1989 and the absence of a violent military response from the Soviet military opened the way for a return to democratic government and, after that, German reunification. In May 1990 a municipal election was held in East Berlin. Schwierzina's name was at the top of the SDP candidate list. In the election, the SDP topped the poll, with 34.1% of the vote against 30.1% for the PDS, a "new" party resulting from a hasty makeover of what had previously been East Germany's ruling SED party. As the lead candidate from the leading party, Schwierzina had the first chance to stand for the job of mayor. He was elected by an overwhelming majority of Berlin's senate members, making it clear – unusually for an elected city mayor – that his primary objective was to negotiate his way out of office by creating, with his western counterpart, a reunited Berlin city administration. His term would run from 30 May 1990 to 11 January 1991. He was succeeded, albeit briefly, by his deputy, Thomas Krüger who from 11 January 1991 till 24 January 1991 served as "acting mayor" of East Berlin until the role was superseded and Eberhard Diepgen took office as the mayor of "all Berlin", appointed following the December 1990 city elections. Diepgen's appointment was delayed by a couple of weeks of coalition negotiation since no party had won an overall majority, but the centre-right CDU party had won the largest number of seats.

== Later life and death ==
Between January 1991 and October 1995, Schwierzina sat as a member of the Berlin regional legislature, where he was elected an assembly vice-president and also as Chairman of the Petitions Committee.

Schwierzina went into retirement in 1996. By that time he had already suffered, in 1994, a serious heart attack. Brigitte Schwierzina, his wife, is a doctor who reportedly instructed him, while reading the morning papers, to remain calm now that he was no longer required to feel responsible for matters reported. After he died, at the end of 2003, several of the more heartfelt tributes paid tribute also to Brigitte Schwierzina's skill and care in looking after him during his final years.

== Awards and honours ==
In 1996 he was given by the Berlin Senate the annually awarded "Stadtältester von Berlin" title, an honour celebrating his contribution to the city.

Since 2 June 2014, a street in Berlin-Heinersdorf has been named after Schwierzina.
