= Elaine Trepper =

Namibian politician

Elaine Trepper is a Namibian politician. In December 2010, she was sworn in as the mayor of Windhoek. Trepper is the 9th mayor and the first Black female mayor of Namibia's largest city and capital. A member of SWAPO, Trepper replaced fellow SWAPO member Matthew Shikongo.

== Political career ==
As mayor, Trepper successfully lobbied the national government for funds to connect several of Windhoek's informal settlements in the Tobias Hainyeko Constituency to the electrical grid, saying at the time that Windhoek officials "publicly declare our intention to reverse years of neglect and suffering in the low cost area".
