= Kurt Dahlmann =

German pilot and journalist (1918–2017)

- Born: 4 March 1918; Königsberg, Prussia, German Empire. (now Russia)
- Died: 29 August 2017 (aged 99); Baden-Baden, Germany
- Military career
- Allegiance: Nazi Germany (to 1945); West Germany
- Branch: Luftwaffe
- Service years: 1937–45 (Wehrmacht); 1956–57 (Bundeswehr)
- Rank: Major (Luftwaffe)
- Commands: I./SKG 10, 28 Oct 43; III./KG 51, 15 Aug 44; NSGr 20, 18 Nov 44
- Conflicts: World War II
- Awards: Knight's Cross of the Iron Cross with Oak Leaves

Kurt Dahlmann (4 March 1918 – 29 August 2017) was a German pilot, attorney, journalist, newspaper editor and political activist. He was also a recipient of the Knight's Cross of the Iron Cross with Oak Leaves of Nazi Germany.

== Early life ==
Dahlmann was born in Königsberg (today Kaliningrad). In 1925 Dahlmann and his family moved to Danzig, where he was educated. Upon completing his Abitur in 1936 he took up flight training at the Fliegerübungsstelle (flight training center) at Marienburg in Elbing. He began his flying career smuggling rationed gasoline from Germany to Poland in a light two seat aircraft, the second seat being used to hold a 60-litre (13 imp gal; 16 US gal) gasoline canister. Following obligatory service in the Reichsarbeitsdienst he was inducted into the Luftwaffe in November 1937 and furthered his flight training at Luftkriegsschule 3 (LKS 3—3rd air war school), Wildpark-West near Werder. In 1939 shortly before the start of the Second World War he received his commission as a Luftwaffe Lieutenant.

== Second World War ==
Dahlmann was further trained as a bomber and ground attack pilot, flying both Junkers Ju 88 and Fw 190 in that role. He participated in the Polish Campaign, the Battle of Britain, and the campaign against France as well as the North African Campaign under Rommel at the controls of a Junkers Ju 88. He was never shot down although, according to him, he did have to leave his aircraft involuntarily on various occasions.

Dahlmann later specialized in solo night bombing attacks against specific high-value targets. These missions included weapons factories in Britain, British airfields, late war harassing bombing raids over London and attacking the Remagen bridge which was the first Allied open crossing over the Rhine river into Germany. He was also personally assigned a specially stripped-down, high-speed Fw 190 for target marking and pathfinding missions.

He flew over 350 combat missions throughout Europe between September 1940 and 8 May 1945 (VE Day), and was awarded the Knight's Cross of the Iron Cross (No. 711) for flying 200 missions and subsequently the Oak Leaves for having successfully completed 300 combat missions, becoming the highest-decorated German Jabo (Schlachtflieger) pilot of the war. He finished the war as a major commanding a total of three squadrons, I./SKG 10, III./KG 51 and NSG 20; all were equipped with variations of fast nocturnal attack aircraft based on the Fw 190.

== Post-war ==
Following his release as an Allied POW, Dahlmann studied law at the university of Kiel in northern Germany, which he completed in 1949 and subsequently became a member of the bar in Schleswig-Holstein. Shortly thereafter he became a junior correspondent for the Kieler Nachrichten newspaper which was to be the start to his second career.

In 1958 he left Germany for South West Africa (modern Namibia), where he was hired by the Allgemeine Zeitung newspaper in Windhoek. He remained there until 1978 as editor in chief, then was fired, in part, for his liberal political views on apartheid. Between 1979 and 1984 he ventured into business within the local tourism and advertising sectors. From 1984 until 1985 he was editor of the German language Namibia Nachrichten thought to have been funded by the West German government.

After a long battle with cancer, which forced his return to Germany to seek treatment, Dahlmann moved into a public assisted-living facility in Baden-Baden. He died in August 2017 at the age of 99.

== Political activism ==
Writing under the pen name Stachus, symbolised as a potted cactus with an oblique dip pen, Dahlmann was adamant about the fleeting nature of apartheid. He wrote many editorials on this topic suggesting ways that Namibia and South Africa should address the issue of inevitable black rule in both countries.

His views so grated Diether Lauenstein, who had recently purchased the paper, that he was fired from the Allgemeine Zeitung newspaper in 1978. Dahlmann alleged that Lauenstein fired him on 20 April 1978, the birthday of Adolf Hitler. Lauenstein was adamantly opposed to Namibian independence, and his enthusiastic support for apartheid as well as the continued South African rule of the territory placed him at odds with Dahlmanns' own views, which were generally in favour of independence and majority rule. Dahlmann would later state publicly that the acquisition of the paper by Lauenstein was at the behest of the South African government with the view of expanding its dominance over Namibia. Dahlmanns' Namibian activism was based on three premises: the end of apartheid, continued independence vs integration with South Africa, and universal, race- and gender-independent, suffrage for all Namibians.

== Awards and decorations ==
- Flugzeugführerabzeichen
- Ehrenpokal der Luftwaffe (19 January 1942)
- Front Flying Clasp of the Luftwaffe in Gold
- Iron Cross
  - 2nd Class
  - 1st Class
- German Cross in Gold on 15 February 1943 as Oberleutnant in the III./Kampfgeschwader 30
- Knight's Cross of the Iron Cross with Oak Leaves
  - Knight's Cross on 11 June 1944 as Major and Gruppenkommandeur of the I./Schnellkampfgeschwader 10
  - 711th Oak Leaves on 24 January 1945 as Major and Geschwaderkommodore of Nachtschlachtgeschwader 20
