= Agnes Kafula =

Namibian politician (born 1955)

- Born: 1 November 1955
- Citizenship: Namibian
- Occupation: Politician
- Title: Mayor of Windhoek
- Term: 2 years

Agnes Mpingana Kafula (born 1 November 1955) is a Namibian politician who has served as mayor of Windhoek from November 2012 to December 2014. She is a survivor of the Cassinga massacre of 4 May 1978.

During her tenure as mayor of the City of Windhoek, Kafula was involved in dubious land sale deals by awarding land at discount prices to friends and family, resulting in the mass land demonstration in Windhoek.
