= Ndeshihafela Larandja =

Mayor of Windhoek (2025–present)

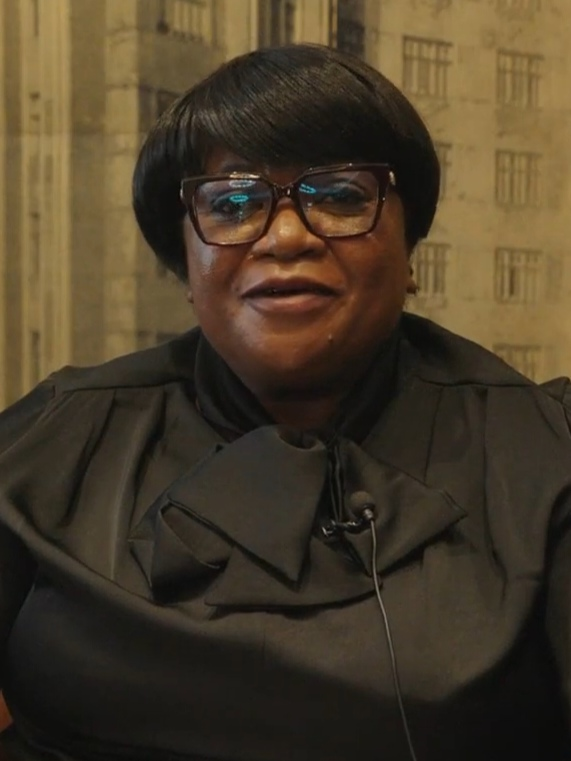
- Larandja in 2025

43th Mayor of Windhoek
- Incumbent
- Assumed office January 21, 2025
- Preceded by: Queen Kamati

Ndeshihafela Larandja is a Namibian politician currently serving as the mayor of Windhoek.
