= Björn von Finckenstein =

Namibian politician (1958–2021)

Mayor of Windhoek
- In office 1995–1998
- Preceded by: Vivienne Graig-McLaren
- Succeeded by: Immanuel Ngatjizeko

Personal details
- Born: Björn Graf Finck von Finckenstein; 23 July 1958 Usakos, South West Africa, South Africa
- Died: 17 December 2021 (aged 63) Swakopmund, Namibia
- Party: SWAPO
- Spouse: Christine Kendzia (m. 1992)
- Children: 2

Björn Graf Finck von Finckenstein (23 July 1958 – 17 December 2021) was a Namibian doctor and politician who served as mayor of Windhoek from 1995 to 1998. He was a member of the SWAPO party.

== Family ==
Björn Graf Finck von Finckenstein was the only child and son of Günther Georg Wilhelm Graf Finck von Finckenstein and his wife Anka-Margit von Goldammer.

His paternal grandfather Friedrich Georg Bechthold Graf Finck von Finckenstein emigrated to German South West Africa, where he married Dorothea Freiin von Puttkamer, another emigrant to German South West Africa. They also had four daughters there.

== Career ==
He served as a member of the Windhoek municipal council, and was Mayor of Windhoek from 1995 to 1998, the first SWAPO member to hold that position.

== Marriage and issue ==
He married Christine Kendzia in November 1992, and had one daughter and one son.
