= Thomas Krüger =

German politician

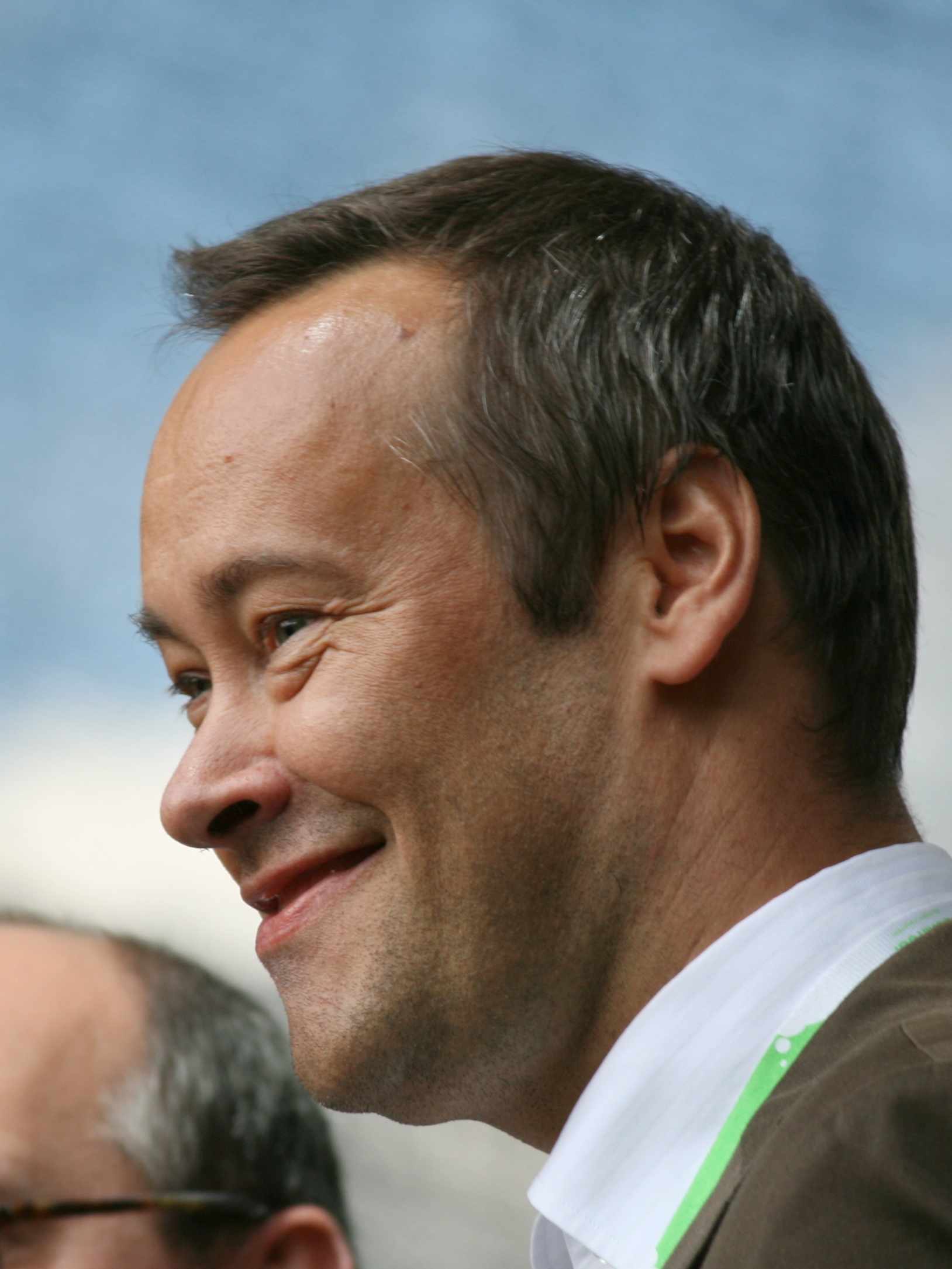
- Krüger in 2008

7th Lord Mayor of East Berlin
- Acting
- In office 11 January 1991 – 24 January 1991
- Preceded by: Tino Schwierzina
- Succeeded by: Eberhard Diepgen (Unified Berlin)

Member of the Bundestag
- In office 16 October 1994 – 26 September 1998

Personal details
- Born: 20 June 1959 (age 67) Buttstädt, East Germany
- Party: Social Democratic Party

Military service
- Allegiance: East Germany
- Years of service: 1979–1981

Thomas Krüger (born 20 June 1959) is a German politician. He is the President of the Federal Agency for Civil Education (since 2000) and the President of the German Children's Fund (since 1995). He served as the final Governing Mayor of East Berlin in 1991.

== Biography ==
Thomas Krüger was born in Buttstädt, East Germany on 20 June 1959. He served on the Bundestag from 1994 to 1998 and was the 7th and final Lord Mayor of East Berlin, serving in 1991. In 2006 he received the Order of Merit of the Federal Republic of Germany. In 2008 he received the Cross of Merit from the Polish Ambassador to Germany at the time, Marek Prawda.
