= World Press Institute =

The World Press Institute (WPI) is an American nonprofit, educational organization based in Minneapolis–Saint Paul, Minnesota, that offers paid fellowships for international journalists. It is funded by a wide range of foundations, local and national media institutions, multinational corporations, and individuals from all over the world. The institute was founded in 1961 and its fellowship program started in the same year. To date, the WPI has brought more than 550 international journalists to the United States. Currently, the program is hosted in conjunction with the University of St. Thomas in Saint Paul, MN. The two-month program gives international journalists the opportunity to immerse themselves in American culture, explore issues that affect global journalism and gain a fresh understanding of their profession through a demanding schedule of meetings, briefings and travel.

== History ==
The World Press Institute was founded in 1961 by journalist Harry W. Morgan (1934–2007). Fellows were originally hosted at Macalester College in Saint Paul, Minnesota, where Morgan served as director of the institution's International Center. The program originally saw international journalists spend a year in America under the auspices of the WPI, including one six-month semester at Macalester College, during which fellows lived in dorms or with host families while studying American history, politics, culture and journalism. Another three months were spent working at a large American news organization. The program ended with a graduation dinner at Macalester and inauguration into the college's Omega Upsilon Tau (OUT) fraternity.

In 2007, the WPI was forced to end the program because of financial difficulties and it severed ties with Macalester College. In 2008, the institute was revived with new funding and leadership under current executive director, David McDonald. A shorter program of eight to nine weeks was introduced.

== Today ==
According to the World Press Institute, their mission statement is: "To promote and strengthen press freedom throughout the world." The criteria for eligibility requires applicants to have completed at least five years of full-time employment in print, broadcast or online journalism. The successful applicants must be currently employed as a non-U.S. journalist, working outside of the United States.

WPI fellows begin their two-month fellowship with seminars on various subjects, including ethics, investigative reporting and social media at the University of St. Thomas. Journalists live at the university for three weeks, before embarking on a five-week tour of U.S. newsrooms, institutions and cities that spans several states. Fellows return to St. Thomas for a final week of meetings, briefings and seminars before attending a graduation ceremony.

By 2014, WPI had over 500 alumni from 94 different countries.

== Alumni ==
- Andrés Oppenheimer (1977)
- Audronius Ažubalis (1990)
- Ben Antao (1967)
- Carlo Rognoni (1965)
- Christopher Dieckmann (journalist) (1990)
- D. Shelton A. Gunaratne (1967)
- Dennis Campbell Kennedy (1964)
- Guillermo Thorndike (1965)
- Héctor Olave (1967)
- Hu Shuli (1987)
- Kaius Niemi (2003)
- Kwaku Sakyi-Addo (1992)
- Leo J. Enright (1981)
- Maev-Ann Wren (1982)
- Max Hastings (1968)
- Nelson Castro (1985)
- Ricardo Halac (1965)
- Yvonne-Denise Köchli (1983)
- Silvia Taulés (2006)
- Sonja Smith
