= Dirk Mudge =

Namibian politician (1928–2020)

Member of the Constituent Assembly / National Assembly
- In office 1989–1993

Member of the Council of Ministers
- In office 1980–1989

President of the Republican Party
- In office 1977–1993
- Preceded by: position established

Personal details
- Born: Dirk Frederik Mudge; 16 January 1928 Rusthof, Otjiwarongo, South West Africa
- Died: 26 August 2020 (aged 92) Windhoek, Namibia
- Cause of death: COVID-19
- Resting place: Namibia
- Party: Republican Party
- Spouse: Stienie Jacobs
- Children: 5
- Education: Stellenbosch University
- Religion: Dutch Reformed Church

Dirk Frederik Mudge (16 January 1928 – 26 August 2020) was a Namibian politician. He served in several high-ranking positions in the South African administration of South West Africa, was the chairman of the 1975–1977 Turnhalle Constitutional Conference, and co-founded the Republican Party (RP) of Namibia as well as the Democratic Turnhalle Alliance (DTA), now known as the Popular Democratic Movement (PDM).

At Namibian independence, Mudge was a member of the Constituent Assembly and 1st National Assembly until he retired in 1993. Mudge was the founder of Namibia's Afrikaans daily Die Republikein and its publisher Namibia Media Holdings. He served on the board of directors until 2008.

== Early life and education ==
Dirk Mudge, a White Namibian of Afrikaner descent with mixed Dutch and German roots, was born on the farm Rusthof near Otjiwarongo. He was a farmer by profession. In 1947, he graduated from Stellenbosch University with a Bachelor of Commerce, whereupon he worked as an accountant in Windhoek. Between 1952 and 1960, he farmed with cattle.

== Political career ==
=== Until the 1975–77 Turnhalle conference ===
In 1955, Mudge became a member of the pro-apartheid National Party (NP), which governed South Africa between 1948 and 1994. He was elected to the whites-only Legislative Assembly in 1961 to represent Otjiwarongo. In 1965, Mudge became a member of the executive committee for South West Africa and thus a high-ranking administrator of the territory, holding this position until 1977.

When AH du Plessis, the leader of the South West African branch of the National Party, was appointed Minister in 1969, Mudge acted in his position as leader of the NP. At that time he began to disagree with NP's views on the future of South West Africa. He forged a friendship with Herero Chief Clemens Kapuuo, discussed plans for a self-governed South West Africa with then-Prime Minister of South Africa John Vorster, and became one of the driving forces behind the 1975–77 Turnhalle Constitutional Conference.

The Turnhalle Conference was an attempt to win over a broad spectrum of the indigenous population by means of small reforms and compromises, and thus make them cease their support for the armed resistance waged by SWAPO at that time. Its aim was also to cement the separation of the South West African ethnicities by making the future state of Namibia, a constitution of which was drafted at the Turnhalle conference, a confederation of bantustans. Mudge served as chairman. As a result of the conference, many of the participating delegates agreed to aggregate their small, ethnically defined parties into one bigger body that was able to form a counterbalance to SWAPO. Mudge founded the Republican Party (RP) shortly before the Turnhalle proceedings finished. The RP joined when on 5 November 1977 the Democratic Turnhalle Alliance (DTA) was founded with Clemens Kapuuo as first president and Dirk Mudge as chairman.

At that time Mudge founded Die Republikein, until today the only Afrikaans daily, as a mouthpiece of the RP. He also established Democratic Media Holdings (today Namibia Media Holdings), the publishing agency of the newspaper.

=== In interim governments of South West Africa ===
The subsequent 1978 South West African legislative election was won by the DTA by a landslide, which claimed 41 of the 50 seats. Although these elections were the first multi-racial elections in the territory of South West Africa there were allegations of widespread intimidation, not least by the presence of South African troops in the north of the territory. The United Nations Security Council declared these elections "null and void". On 1 July 1980, Mudge became the chairman of the Council of Ministers of the resulting government.

The Council resigned in 1983, and the administration of South West Africa was executed by the South African occupiers again. In September 1983 the Multi-Party Conference (MPC) was established which consisted of 19 "internal" (that is, South West African) parties. After considering his options, Mudge agreed to become the DTA representative on this conference, although he had hoped for a different outcome of its proceedings:

As in the past, they [proposers of the MPC] did not have any problems in convincing members of the DTA and other parties to participate, seeing that there would be financial benefits involved. I found myself standing alone in the DTA and, much against my will, I agreed to participate – provided that the MPC confine itself to a discussion on constitutional proposals, and that an interim government would not be considered. I should have known better. It did not take long before the possibility of another interim government was raised and strongly supported by virtually every member of the MPC.

The MPC suggested in its April 1985 Bill of Fundamental Rights and Objectives the establishment of a Transitional Government of National Unity (TNGU). South Africa followed this suggestion three months later, setting up a forced coalition government under the leadership of the DTA (22 seats) but including five smaller parties of eight seats each.

The TNGU was chaired by its ministers on a round-robin basis, changing every three months. Mudge as Minister of Finance took the rotating chairmanship in 1986 and in 1988. However, as president of the largest party in the TNGU, Mudge was the de facto leader of the government, and within the DTA, Mudge's Republican Party was seen as the driving force.

=== After Namibian independence ===
In November 1989, Dirk Mudge founded the Democratic Media Trust of Namibia, an agency funding newsprinting in Namibia with the mission to "promote a free and independent media in Namibia". For the establishment of this trust, money was used that was originally meant to fight SWAPO in the 1989 independence elections. The trust owned Democratic Media Holdings which in turn owned John Meinert Printing, Namibia's biggest newspaper printing works. By 2007 the trust had sold its remaining stakes in the printing industry and became a charity dedicated to education and development. Mudge was chairman of the Board of Directors of the trust until 2008.

Mudge gained a seat on a DTA ticket in the 1989 election to the Constituent Assembly of Namibia which became independent Namibia's first National Assembly. He retired in 1993.

== Legacy ==
The effect of Mudge's political involvement on the progress of Namibia's independence is controversial. While on the one side he had been lauded for bringing about a multi-party political system and multi-ethnic elections, others see him as having delayed independence of the territory, prolonged the suffering of the indigenous population, and entrenched racial segregation.

On 9 December 2016, 69 years after graduating with a bachelor's degree, Mudge was awarded a PhD honoris causa by his alma mater Stellenbosch University. The motivation read:

"With exceptional visionary, strategic and transformational leadership, he not only served as "peace broker", leading his traditional support base onto a new path, but also played a significant role in facilitating reconciliation between white and black in Namibia. In many respects, he helped break through the post-World War II impasse on the status and position of this former mandated territory of South Africa."

== Retirement and death ==
Dirk Mudge retired from politics in April 1993 and returned to his farm Ovikere near Kalkfeld in Namibia's Otjozondjupa Region. He was married to Stienie Jacobs (she died in 2017). Together, they had five children, sixteen grandchildren and twenty-three great-grandchildren. Mudge was the father of fellow politician Henk Mudge who succeeded him as leader of the Republican Party.

In May 2015, at the age of 86, Mudge published his autobiography. The book was originally written in Afrikaans and titled "Dirk Mudge: Enduit vir 'n onafhanklike Namibië". The book was then translated to English and released in May 2016 with the title "All the way to an independent Namibia". In the preface of the English version, Piet Croucamp writes:

"Mudge's memoir does not relive the past in times of modernity. The reader becomes displaced ‒ in a way ‒ to a familiar but awkward if not painful past. The narrative, conceived in stigma and shame, is presented with a "respectability" or even bizarre "reality" which once was "normal" to some and an abomination to others. Dirk Mudge has made a remarkable contribution with a text which merits both literary and scholarly value. The work was not intended as a comprehensive history of Namibia ‒ it is a memoir about the life and times of Dirk Mudge."

In 2020, Mudge contracted COVID-19 during the COVID-19 pandemic in Namibia and developed a lung infection. He died on 26 August in a private clinic in Windhoek at age 92.

== Sources ==
- Shamuyarira, NM (April 1977). "The Lusaka Manifesto Strategy of OAU States and its Consequences for the Freedom Struggle in Southern Africa" (PDF). The African Review. 2 (2). Michigan State University.
- "Democratic Elections in Namibia. An International Experiment in Nation Building" (PDF). National Democratic Institute for International Affairs. June 1989. p. 12.
