= Hannes Smith =

Namibian journalist, editor and publisher

Johannes Martin "Hannes" Smith (17 March 1933 – 5 August 2008), affectionately known as Smithie, was a Namibian journalist, editor and publisher. He was first reporter at, then the editor of, the Windhoek Advertiser until 1978 when he and Gwen Lister founded the Windhoek Observer, the country's only Saturday paper at that time. He remained the owner and editor of the Observer until his death.

== Personal ==
Smith was born in Grootfontein, Otjozondjupa Region. His parents were Angolan Afrikaners whose families participated in the Dorsland Trek. Smith started suffering from Alzheimer's disease in June 2008, and died on 5 August 2008 as a result of the disease.

== Editorial work ==
According to Andreas Rothe, Smith was honoured by his competitors as a "legendary muckraker" who "did not bow to the South African nor the SWAPO government." After Lister left the newspaper in 1984, Smith ran it as a one-man operation, calling himself "reporter-in-chief". His daughter, Yanna Erasmus, later joined him at the newspaper.

== 1959 Old Location controversy ==
In August 2003, President Sam Nujoma and Smith became involved in a conflict regarding the 1959 Old Location Massacre, which saw a number of black protestors shot by the South African Police. Nujoma wrote in his autobiography, Where Others Wavered: The Autobiography of Sam Nujoma, that the wounded were denied medical treatment by white medical staff, including those at the small Red Cross Society clinic. Smith, a young reporter in Windhoek at the time of massacre, challenged that claim, stating that he had personally witnessed injured blacks receiving treatment. Nujoma responded by accusing Smith of "blackmail" and dishonesty.
