= Nelson Castro (journalist) =

Argentine journalist, doctor and writer

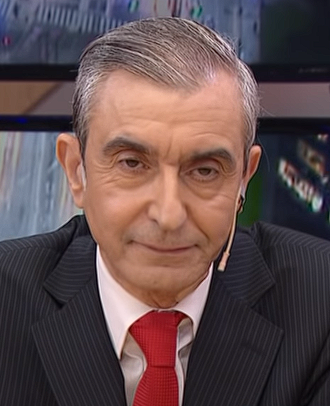
- Born: Nelson Alberto Castro; April 5, 1955 (age 71)
- Occupations: Journalist, physician, writer
- Writing career
- Language: Spanish

Nelson Alberto Castro (born April 5, 1955, in San Martín, Province of Buenos Aires) is an Argentine journalist, physician and writer. He hosts "El Juego Limpio" (English: Fair Game), a political debate show on Todo Noticias.

== Early life ==
Castro was born on April 5, 1955, in the town of San Martín, in the province of Buenos Aires, to Elsa and Nelson Manuel Castro. From 1961 to 1973, he attended the Nuestra Señora de Luján religious school, finishing both elementary and high school there. When he was five months old, he was diagnosed with gangrenous erysipelas, an infectious disease product of an unknown germ. As a result of it, he had to undergo facial reconstruction surgery seven times by the time he was 14, and nearly died. According to Castro himself, this was a "real challenge" to him.

== In medicine ==
Starting in 1974, he attended the University of Buenos Aires. He earned a degree in Medicine on April 2, 1980. A neurologist, in 1986 he travelled to the United States as he received a scholarship to study at Northwestern University.

He worked as a physician for ten years, alongside his journalistic career, until 1993; according to Castro himself, he decided to leave the medical field as it was no longer "ethical" to continue exercising it, as patients often visited his medical office not to get treated but "to see the man who appeared on TV".

== In journalism ==
He graduated from the Grafótecnico Institute as a journalist in 1974. At first both a sports journalist and color commentator, he performed the task for over ten years, up until 1984, when he joined the Buenos Aires-based Radio Municipal and jumped into political commentary. That same year, he was awarded a scholarship from the World Press Institute (WPI) due to his covering of the Irangate, where he was chosen in a contest between 1500 journalists from all over the world. He performed economic and political analysis studies at Harvard University, eventually achieving a master's degree in political journalism. During his time in the US, he also performed as an intern at the National Public Radio and National Broadcasting Company, as part of the WPI plan.

In 1988, he was hired by Radio El Mundo, also based in the capital city. That same year he was the first Latin American journalist to announce the victory of George H. W. Bush in the U.S. presidential elections, an event which was highlighted by Voice of America.

In 1991, he was chosen to cover the Persian Gulf War by the same radio station. Castro there communicated (Via telephone) with U.S. Air Force captain Ralph Scott, warning him that President Bush had ordered to make the final attack by ground on the Iraqi troops. As the result of this, he was selected by the local U.S. embassy to participate at the Worldnet conference with U.S. State Department officials and government authorities.

In 1993, he ventured into television, starting with the "En la mira" TV show, which was broadcast by CableVisión Noticias. The show ran until March 1998, where he resigned his contract with the network. That same year, he was hired by news channel Todo Noticias (TN) to host "Juego limpio", a political debate show.

He currently hosts "El juego limpio", a political debate show, aired by TV news network TN. He also writes for the Perfil newspaper and hosts a radio show, "La mirada despierta", on the Continental radio station.
