= List of mayors of Windhoek =

The city of Windhoek, the capital of South West Africa and later Namibia, was officially founded on 18 October 1890 by Curt Karl Bruno von François, an Imperial German Colonial Official in the Schutztruppe. Its purpose was to serve as the capital of German South West Africa. Since its establishment, the city has had 49 different mayors, with the first one assuming office in 1909.

== List of mayors ==
=== German colonial administration (1894–1915) ===
- 1909–1910: Dr. Fritsche, first mayor of Windhoek
- 1910–1911: Gustav Voigts
- 1911–1915: Peter Müller, born 1873, member of the Schutztruppe, later businessman

=== South African Mandate (1915–1966) ===
- 1915–1916: Peter Müller, 1st time, born 1873, member of the Schutztruppe, later businessman
- 191?–1918: Dr. Kohler
- 1920–1922: Peter Müller, 2nd time, born 1873, member of the Schutztruppe, later businessman
- 1927–1929: Joseph Wood, born 17 February 1876 in Birmingham, a Wesleyan Church minister.
- 1929–1938: John Meinert, born 9 December 1886 in Hamburg, Germany. Businessman and founder of John Meinert Printing Ltd.
- 19??–19??: Edgar Sander, born 4 March 1895 in Leipzig, Saxony, Germany, entered Namibia in 1923. Sander farmed with Karakul skins and was a member of the Legislative Assembly of South-West Africa.
- 19??–19??: Abraham Bernard May, 1st time, medical doctor and district surgeon
- 1941–1946: Marie Elizabeth May Bell, first female mayor of Windhoek
- 1950s: Simon Frank, born 11 October 1913 in Robertson, South Africa. Advocate Frank was mayor of Newcastle in KwaZulu-Natal before taking the post in Windhoek.
- 1953–1954: Peter Falk (Politician) (1886–1974)
- 1954–1955: Willem Hendrik Immelmann, born 11 February 1904 in Sutherland, Cape Colony, was a manager at Windhoek Universal Motors.
- 1956–1957: Hermanus Johannes Steyn, born in 1890 in Ermelo, Transvaal Colony. Steyn was an ophthalmologist and the leader of the National Party of South-West Africa.
- 1957–1961: Jaap Snyman (Jacobus van Deventer Snyman), businessman, born 7 February 1919 in Zeerust, South Africa. Snyman was the owner of the car that was set on fire during the Old Location Uprising in December 1959, prompting the police to open fire at the protesters and killing 11 people.
- 1961–1963: Stefanus Johannes Spies, born 26 June 1922 in Oudtshoorn, South Africa. He was a businessman and entered Namibia in 1945.
- 1963–1965: Jack Levinson
- 1965-196?: Sam Davis

=== South African Occupation (1966–1990) ===
- 1966–1966: Hendrik Petrus Labuschagne (better known as Johann), a business man in the Motor Industry in Windhoek. Born 3 November 1920.
- 19??–19??: Dries Yssel
- 19??–19??: Joey Olivier
- 19??–19??: Petra Hamman, 1st time
- 19??–19??: Vivienne Graig-McLaren, 1st time
- 1970–1971: Joachim Bernhard Hermann von Prittwitz und Gaffron, mechanical engineer, first Mayor from German nobility
- 1974–1976: Günther Kaschik, born 16 January 1930 in Germany, was a businessman and manager of the South-West African Buildings Society
- 1988–1990: Abraham Bernard May, 2nd time (1912–1993)

=== Independent Namibia (1990–present) ===
- 1990–1991: Abraham Bernard May, 2nd time (1912–1993)
- 1991–1992: Petra Hamman, 2nd time
- 1993–1994: Matheus Shikongo (1950–2021), 1st time, first black Mayor
- 1994–1995: Vivienne Graig-McLaren, 2nd time
- 1995–1998: Björn Graf Finck von Finckenstein (1958–2021)
- 1999-2000: Immanuel Ngatjizeko
- 2000–2010: Matheus Shikongo (1950–2021), 2nd time, died from the COVID-19 pandemic in Namibia, longest-serving mayor of Windhoek
- 2010–2012: Elaine Trepper
- 2012–2014: Agnes Kafula
- 2014–2019: Muesee Kazapua
- 2019–2020: Fransina Kahungu
- 2020–2021: Job Amupanda
- 2021–2023: Sade Gawanas
- 2023–2023: Joseph Uapingene
- 2023–2025: Queen Kamati
- 2025–present: Ndeshihafela Larandja

== See also ==
- Timeline of Windhoek
