= Brian Semujju =

Ugandan journalism scholar and journalist

Brian Semujju (6 October 1980 – 3 August 2025) was a Ugandan academic, journalist, and media theorist. A Senior lecturer in the Department of Journalism and Communication at Makerere University, he was known for his research advocating for African perspectives in global media and for developing the Small Systems Dependency Theory (SSDT). He was a recipient of the prestigious Fulbright African Research Scholar Award in 2022.

== Academic Work ==
His most notable theoretical contribution was the Small Systems Dependency Theory (SSDT). This framework analyzed how localized Information dissemination operates through informal Community Audio Towers in rural East Africa, offering an alternative to traditional Mass communication models. Uganda Radio Network discussed the theory following his death and described it as part of his academic work on communication in Uganda. Semujju examined the work of Namibian journalist Tracy Tafirenyika in a 2025 case study on journalism and political economy. Semujju was awarded the Fulbright African Research Scholar Award. During his fellowship, he served as a Visiting Scholar at the Alan Alda Center for Communicating Science at the State University of New York in the United States.

== Death ==
Semujju passed away on 3 August 2025 at a hospital in Kampala.

== Selected publications ==
A 2025 memorial in the Makerere Journal of Languages, Literature and Communication noted that Semujju worked on journalism theory, community media, science communication and environmental communication.

- Semujju, Brian (2014). "Participatory media for a non-participating community: Western media for Southern communities". International Communication Gazette. 76 (2): 197–208. doi:10.1177/1748048513504166.
- Semujju, Brian (2015). "Frontline farmers, backline sources: Women as a tertiary voice in climate change coverage". Feminist Media Studies. 15 (4): 658–674. doi:10.1080/14680777.2014.946942.
- Semujju, Brian (2025). "Case Study of Political Economy in Tracy Tafirenyika's Public Work". Department of Journalism and Communication, Makerere University. doi:10.5281/zenodo.19983030.
