= Namibia Sport =

Namibian sports magazine

Namibia Sport is a sport magazine in Namibia. The magazine was first published in February 2002 and its founders are Henry Fernandes and Helge Schutz. It covers all sporting activities across the country. An estimated 20,000 readers view the magazine each month.
