= Independence Avenue (Windhoek) =

Coordinates: 22°33′21″S 17°05′00″E

In Windhoek, Namibia, Independence Avenue runs through the heart of downtown and is "easily explored by foot". Prior to independence, the street was known as Kaiserstrasse.

== Notable buildings and parks on Independence Avenue ==
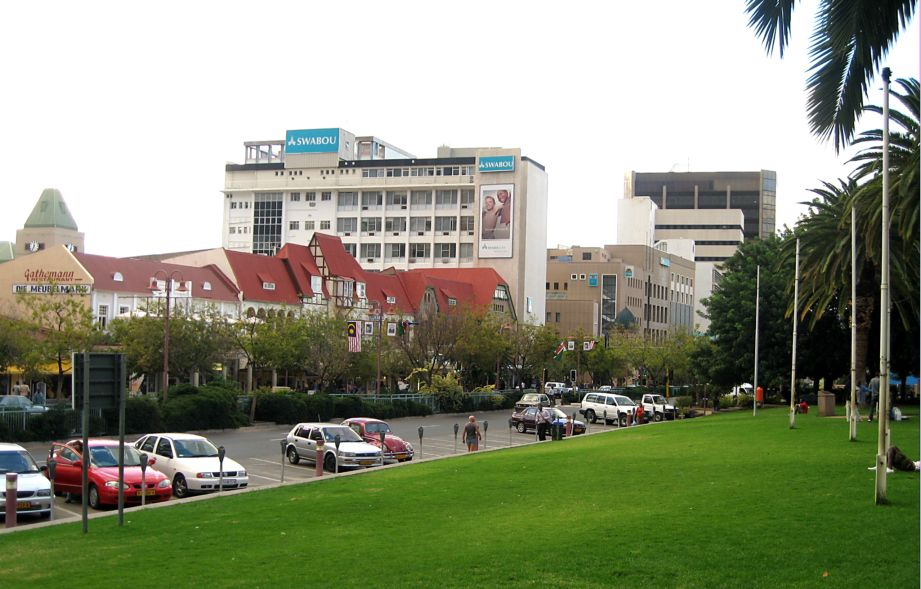
Zoo Park

- Sanlam Centre, which is host to a number of embassies, including the embassy of Germany in Windhoek
- Zoo Park (corner of Fidel Castro St. and Independence)
