= Windhoek Synagogue =

Synagogue in Windhoek, Namibia

- Location of the synagogue in Namibia

Religion
- Affiliation: Orthodox Judaism
- Ecclesiastical or organizational status: Synagogue
- Status: Active

Location
- Location: 48 Mandume Ndemufayo Avenue, Windhoek
- Country: Namibia
- Interactive map of Windhoek Synagogue
- Coordinates: 22°33′58″S 17°04′53″E

Architecture
- Founder: Rabbi I. L. Landau
- Completed: 1924

The Windhoek Synagogue is an Orthodox Jewish synagogue, located in Windhoek, the capital city of Namibia. It is the only active synagogue in the country and is owned and operated by the Windhoek Hebrew Congregation. The synagogue was founded by Rabbi I. L. Landau in 1924.

In November 2015, the community announced plans to close and sell the synagogue, as none of the remaining members of the community viewed themselves as Orthodox Jews. Yet, in 2021, it was reported that the congregation was active.

Another synagogue existed in Keetmanshoop from 1927 and 1973.

== See also ==
- History of the Jews in Namibia
- List of synagogues in Africa
