= Sanlam Centre =

Coordinates: 22°33′32″S 17°04′57″E

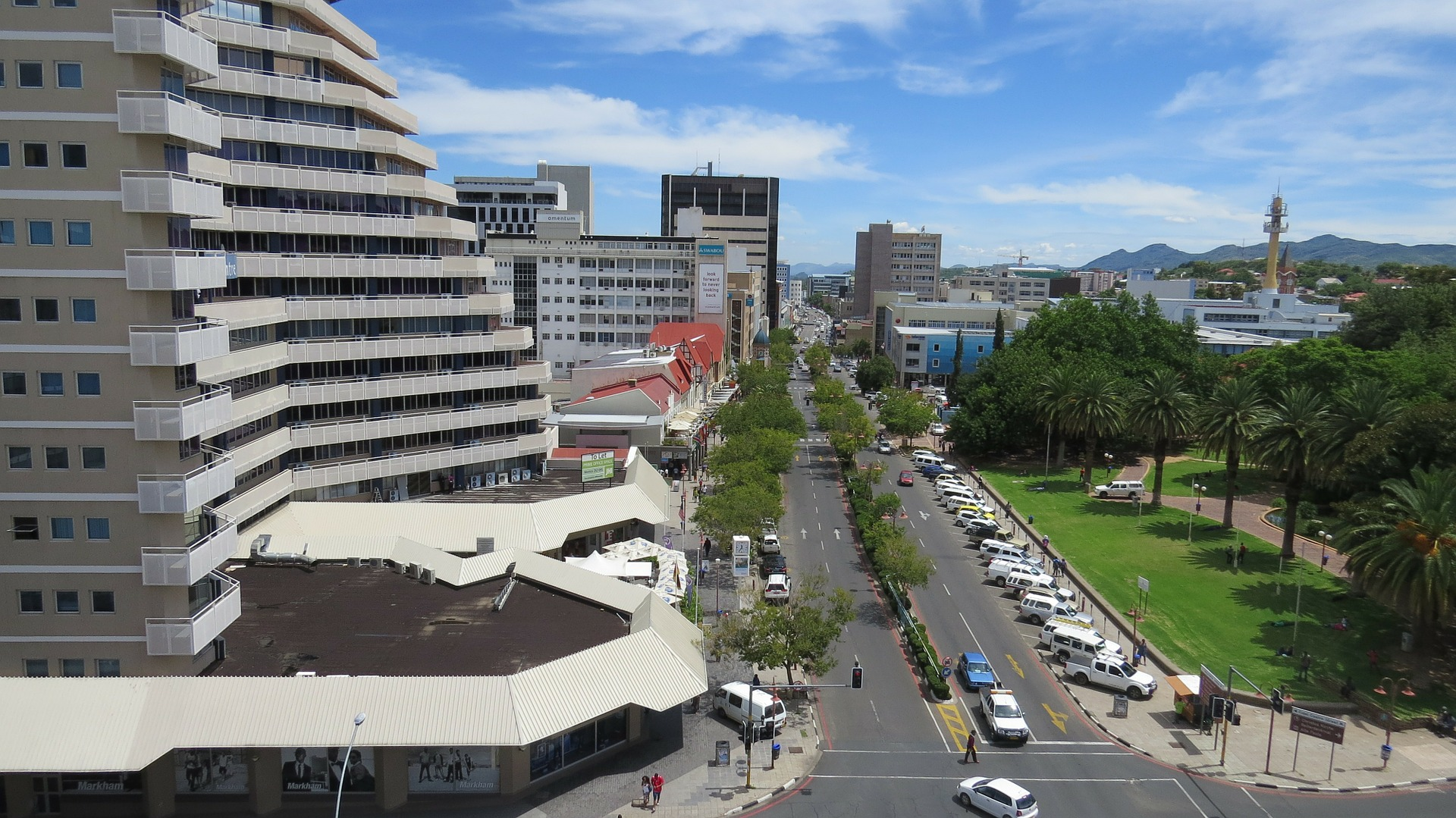
Sanlam Centre (left)

The Sanlam Centre is a building in downtown Windhoek, Namibia. Located on Independence Avenue, the building was built in 1990, the same year as Namibia's independence. It has 15 floors and 28,000 m^{2} of floor space. The German, Swedish and Venezuelan embassies are located in the building, as is the American Cultural Center, an extension of the United States embassy in Namibia. It is named after South Africa-based Sanlam Ltd.
