= Karl Bömer =

German propaganda officer (1900 – 1942)

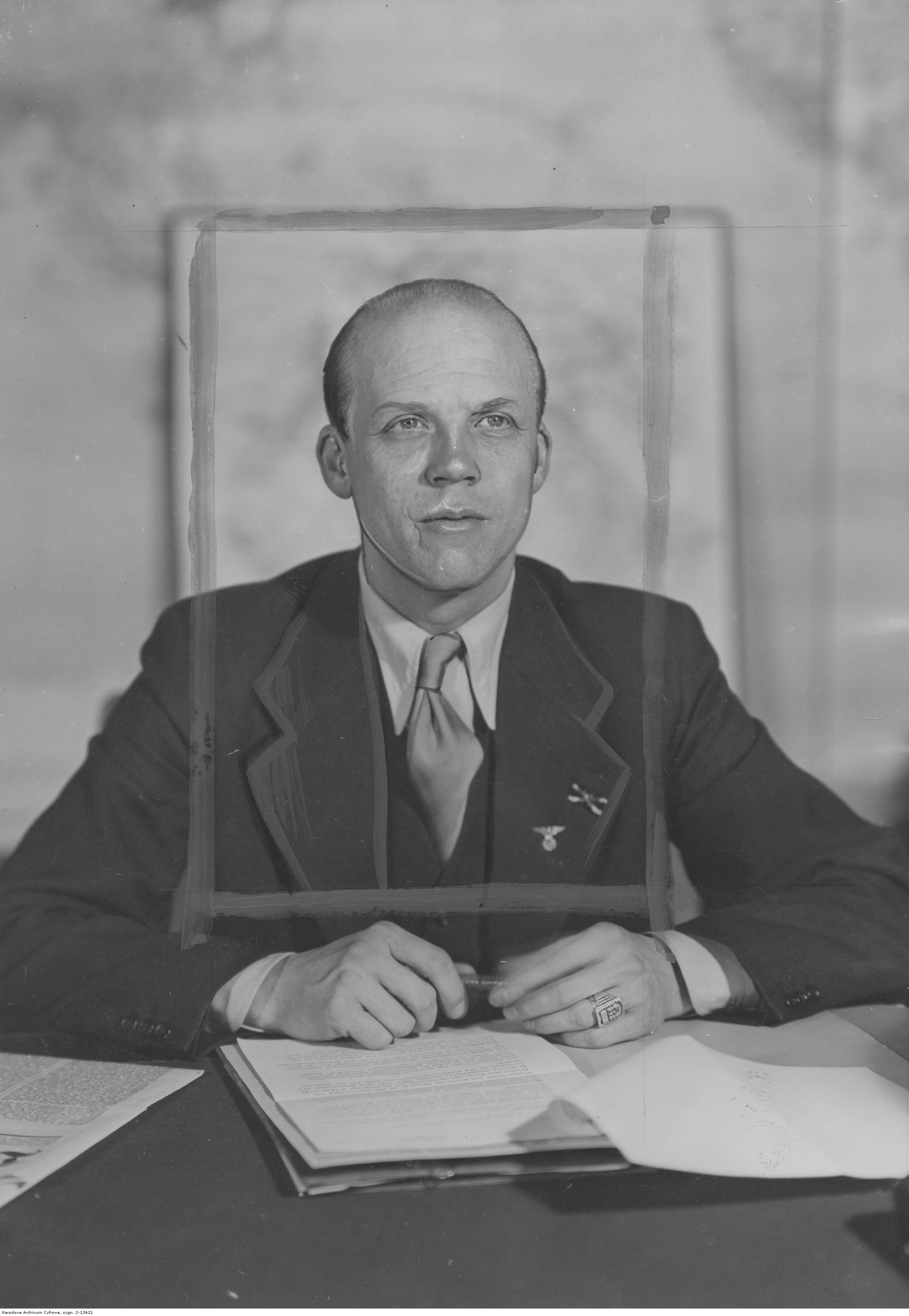
- Bömer in 1940

Personal details
- Born: 7 September 1900 Münster, German Empire
- Died: 22 August 1942 (aged 41) Kraków, Poland
- Party: Nazi Party
- Occupation: Ministerialdirektor in the Ministry for Popular Enlightenment and Propaganda
- Profession: Propagandist, Government Official, Academic

Military service
- Allegiance: German Empire; Nazi Germany
- Branch/service: Imperial German Army; Wehrmacht
- Years of service: 1918–1918 and 1942
- Rank: lieutenant (1942)
- Battles/wars: World War I; World War II

Karl Bömer (7 September 1900 – 22 August 1942) was a German ministerial director and the head of the Foreign Department for Journalism in the Ministry of Propaganda. His accidental hint at German plans to invade the USSR led to his arrest by the Gestapo in May 1941. Subsequently, he fought on the Eastern Front in 1942 and sustained injuries near Kharkov; Bömer died in a military hospital in Kraków.

== Education and early career ==
Bömer embarked on academic pursuits in journalism in the late 1920s, including visits to various American universities and lecturing at the School of Journalism of the University of Missouri. It was during this time that Bömer crossed paths with Pierre J. Huss, who would later head the INS Berlin bureau. Prior to his appointment in the Nazi Propaganda Ministry, Bömer cultivated experience in journalism and public relations and participated in initiatives aimed at fostering improved relations between Germany and Mexico as well as the US.

== Career in the Nazi era (1932–1941) ==
Bömer joined the NSDAP in 1932. Bömer was appointed by Alfred Rosenberg to lead the Press Department of the NSDAP's Foreign Policy Office in May 1933. Around the same time in 1933, Bömer was hired as a lecturer in journalism at the German University of Politics. As a Nazi favorite, Bömer replaced Emil Dovifat at the German University of Politics while continuing to work as a press advisor for Alfred Rosenberg. In 1938 Bömer became the head of the Foreign Department for Journalism in the Ministry of Propaganda. As Bömer assumed control of the foreign section, Alfred-Ingemar Berndt, the former department head, transitioned to overseeing domestic matters. However, by the onset of 1938/39, Hans Fritzsche, a radio journalist, had replaced Alfred-Ingemar Berndt, who then assumed leadership of the ministry's literature department.

Bömer's familiarity with publicity methods gleaned from his time in the US and his academic interest in newspapers positioned him as a valuable resource in shaping and managing the foreign press corps's perception of the Nazi regime in Germany.

== Dismissal and arrest (1941) ==
In May 1941 Bömer's inadvertent revelation of the Soviet attack while under the influence at a Bulgarian Embassy gathering in Berlin led to his dismissal from ministry news conferences. Despite inquiries from foreign correspondents, Bömer's whereabouts remained undisclosed until it was revealed that he had been apprehended by the Gestapo. Following the invasion of the Soviet Union in June 1941, Bömer faced trial and condemnation by a People's Court, losing all titles and receiving a prison sentence.

In the spring of 1942, Joseph Goebbels finally convinced Hitler to release Bömer. Soon after being released, Bömer departed for the Eastern Front with the aim of redeeming himself.

== Death ==
Bömer sustained injuries near Kharkov and died in a military hospital in Krakow in August 1942, holding the rank of lieutenant at the time of his demise. Joseph Goebbels secured Bömer's posthumous rehabilitation.
