= Matheus Shikongo =

Namibian politician and businessman (1950–2021)

Matheus Kristof Shikongo (26 June 1950 – 13 May 2021) was a Namibian politician and businessman. A member of SWAPO, Shikongo was the mayor of Windhoek, Namibia's capital, in 1993 and from 2000 to 2010. He helped establish the Namibian Chamber of Commerce and Industry (NCCI) and served on the boards of several companies, among them NamPower, MetLife Namibia, and Bank Windhoek.

== Life and career ==
Shikongo was born on 26 June 1950, in Ondangwa in Ovamboland (today Oshana Region). He completed school at Ongwediva High School and went first into trading, then banking, insurance and entertainment. He also owned a farm near Tsumeb.

Shikongo worked for Metropolitan Life from 1985 to 1991, and became branch manager. He later served as board member of the Namibian branch. Shikongo died from COVID-19 related causes on 13 May 2021.

== Mayor of Windhoek ==
Shikongo became SWAPO councillor in Windhoek in the 1992 local election and was subsequently elected mayor of Windhoek for the year 1993, the first black person to serve in this role. He was reelected as councillor in 1998 and 2004. In 2000 he was elected mayor again and held this position until 2010, making him the longest-serving mayor of Windhoek.

On July 6, 2000, Shikongo signed a treaty with Eberhard Diepgen, the mayor of Berlin, signifying the Twin city partnership between the two.

Shikongo was one of several Windhoek politicians "withdrawn" by SWAPO in February and March 2009 for suspected loyalty to the opposition Rally for Democracy and Progress. However, it remained unclear if he would be reinstated due to procedural problems regarding his removal. Also, Shikongo was believed to have significant political support among Ovambo people born outside of the cultural Ovamboland, known as Eembwiti. Many Eembwiti live in Katutura, a township of Windhoek.

In December 2010, Shikongo was replaced as mayor by fellow member of SWAPO and deputy mayor Elaine Trepper.
