= Sade Gawanas =

Namibian politician

Mayor of Windhoek
- In office 1 December 2021 – 19 January 2023
- Preceded by: Job Amupanda
- Succeeded by: Joseph Uapingene

Personal details
- Born: Katutura, Khomas Region, Namibia
- Party: Landless People's Movement (Namibia)

Sade Gawanas is a Namibian politician who has served as mayor of Windhoek since 1 December 2021 till 19 January 2023, as her deputy took over. Previously, she was elected into the council of the City of Windhoek following the 2020 local elections. She is from the Landless People's Movement.

== Career ==
Gawanas previously worked as a flight attendant for the national airline Air Namibia before quitting to join active politics. This step was necessitated to comply with a directive by the Electoral Commission of Namibia which prohibits employees to stand as candidates for the National Assembly elections while holding onto their positions (Article 47 of the Constitution of Namibia).

== Personal life ==
Sade Gawanas is the niece of Bience Gawanas.
