= Margaret Courtney-Clarke =

Namibian photographer (born 1949)

Margaret Courtney-Clarke (born 1949) is a Namibian documentary photographer and photojournalist, living in Swakopmund. Her work "frequently explores the resilience of communities enduring the rapidly shifting landscapes of Namibia." Courtney-Clarke has made a trilogy of books on the art of African women: Ndebele (1986), African Canvas (1990), and Imazighen (1996). She has collaborated on books with David Goldblatt and Maya Angelou.

In 2007, Courtney-Clarke had solo exhibitions at New York State Museum and the African American Museum in Philadelphia. In 2019, she was shortlisted for the Prix Pictet for the book Cry Sadness into the Coming Rain (2017).

== Early life and education ==
Courtney-Clarke was born in Swakopmund, in what was then South West Africa (now Namibia). Her parents were Irish and English.

She received Diplomas in Graphic Design and Photography at Technikon Natal in Durban, South Africa in 1971; studied at Scuola Libera di Roma in Rome, Italy in 1974; and obtained a BA in Photojournalism from New York University, New York City in 1978.

== Career ==
Courtney-Clarke has lived in Italy, the USA, and across the African continent, working as a freelance photographer for magazines. She was friends with Maya Angelou.

She has made a trilogy of books on the art of African women. Between 1980 and 1985, for Ndebele: The Art of an African Tribe (1986), she visited Ndebele villages, documenting women painting bold and colorful abstract paintings on house fronts, town walls and on decorative beadwork. On return trips, she also recorded the destruction or abandonment of some of these villages.

From 1986 onwards, for African Canvas: The Art of West African Women (1990), she spent three years travelling through seven West African nations photographing the indigenous art of rural women—predominantly wall painting on houses, compounds and shrines, but also pottery, cloth, and body painting—as well as women making the art and doing work.

Imazighen (free people) (1996), the last in the trilogy, shows the lives and arts of Berber women of North Africa—their pottery, fabrics, rugs and other woven products, and murals. Journalist Geraldine Brooks contributes a narrative.

Returning to live in Namibia, for Cry Sadness into the Coming Rain (2017) she photographed the Namib desert and its people, at a time of crisis.

Her forthcoming book When Tears Don't Matter is about the remaining bushmen in the Kalahari Desert in eastern Namibia.

== Publications ==
=== Books by Courtney-Clarke ===
- Cape Dutch Homesteads. Co-authored with David Goldblatt. South Africa: Struik, 1981; ISBN 9780869771402. Reprinted, 1982.
- Ndebele: The Art of an African Tribe. New York: Rizzoli, 1986. With a foreword by Goldblatt.
  - Ndebele. Germany: Frederking & Thaler.
  - Ndebele: L' Art d'une Tribu D'Afrique du Sud. France: Arthaud 1991, 2002.
  - Südafrika: Die Kunst der Ndebele Frauen. Germany: Villa Arceno.
  - Ndebele: Die Kunst van Een Afrikaanse Stam. Netherlands: Librero, 2002.
  - Ndebele. London: Thames & Hudson, 2002. ISBN 978-0500283875. Paperback reprint with an essay by Goldblatt on The Ndebele Foundation and post apartheid South Africa.
- African Canvas: The Art of West African Women. New York: Rizzoli, 1990. With a foreword by Maya Angelou.
  - Die Farben Afrikas. Germany: Frederking & Thaler.
    - 20th Anniversary edition, 2010.
  - Tableaux D'Afrique: L'Art mural des femmes de L'Ouest. France: Arthaud.
  - Affreschi Africani: l'Arte delle Donne Del Africa Occidentale. Italy: Rizzoli.
- Imazighen: The Vanishing Traditions of Berber Women. New York: Clarkson Potter, 1996. ISBN 9780517597712. With essays by Geraldine Brooks.
  - Imazighen: The Vanishing Traditions of Berber Women. London: Thames & Hudson.
  - Die Berber Frauen: Kunst und Kultur in Nord Afrika. Germany: Frederking & Thaler.
- Places in the Sand. New York: Monacelli, 1997.
- Maya Angelou: The Poetry of Living. New York: Clarkson Potter; UK: Virago, 1999. ISBN 9780609604588. With a foreword by Oprah Winfrey.
- Cry Sadness into the Coming Rain. Göttingen, Germany: Steidl, 2017. ISBN 978-3-95829-253-6. With a foreword by Goldblatt and an essay by Sean O'Toole.

=== Books with Maya Angelou ===
- My Painted House, My Friendly Chicken and Me. By Angelou, with photographs by Courtney-Clarke. New York: Clarkson Potter, 1994; Crown/Random House, 2002.
- Kofi and His Magic. By Angelou, with photographs by Courtney-Clarke. New York: Clarkson Potter, 1997; New York: Crown/Random House, 2002.

== Awards ==
- 2019: Shortlisted, Prix Pictet

== Solo exhibitions ==
- The Art of African Women: Empowering Traditions, New York State Museum, Albany, USA; African American Museum in Philadelphia, 2007. Photographs by Courtney-Clarke "as well as pottery, textiles, beadwork and other decorative arts created by women from all over Africa."

== See also ==
- Gnawa
