= Eberhard Diepgen =

German lawyer and politician (born 1941)

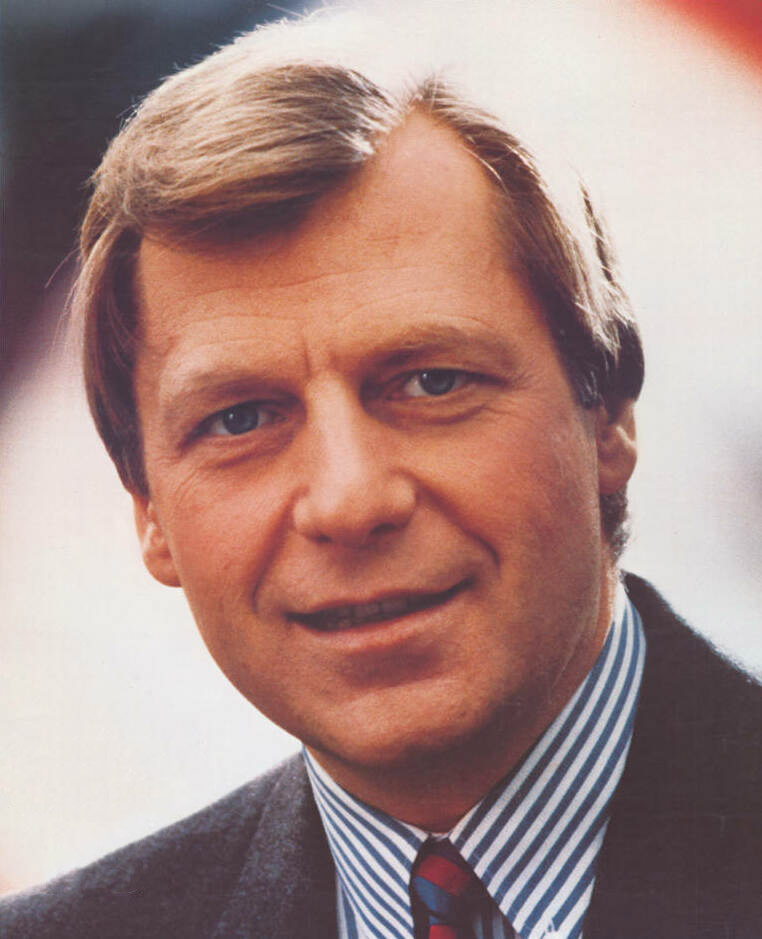
- Diepgen in 1989

Governing Mayor of Berlin (Note: Governing Mayor of West Berlin from 1984 to 1991.)
- In office 24 January 1991 – 16 June 2001
- Mayor: Christine Bergmann; Annette Fugmann-Heesing; Klaus Böger
- Preceded by: Walter Momper (West Berlin); Tino Schwierzina (East Berlin)
- Succeeded by: Klaus Wowereit
- In office 9 February 1984 – 16 March 1989
- Mayor: Heinrich Lummer; Hanna-Renate Laurien
- Preceded by: Richard von Weizsäcker
- Succeeded by: Walter Momper
Parliamentary constituencies
Member of the Abgeordnetenhaus of Berlin
In office 20 April 1971 – 29 November 2001
Preceded by	multi-member district
Succeeded by	Reinhard Führer
Constituency	Neukölln 5 (1995–2001); Neukölln 8 (1989–1995); Neukölln 1 (1985–1989); Tiergarten 3 (1981–1985; 1971–1975); Tiergarten (1979–1981); Tiergarten 4 (1975–1979)
Member of the Bundestag for West Berlin
In office 4 November 1980 – 3 February 1981
Preceded by	multi-member district
Succeeded by	Gerhard Schulze
Constituency	Christian Democratic Union List

Personal details
- Born: 13 November 1941 (age 85) Wedding, Berlin, Nazi Germany (now Germany)
- Party: Christian Democratic Union (1963–)
- Education: Free University of Berlin

Eberhard Diepgen (born 13 November 1941) is a German lawyer and politician who served as Mayor of West Berlin from 1984 to 1989 and again as Mayor of (united) Berlin, from 1991 until 2001, as member of the Christian Democratic Union (CDU).

== Early life, education, and career ==
Eberhard Diepgen was born on 13 November 1941 in the Berlin district of Wedding. He was to become the first native of Berlin in the office of governing mayor. After graduating from high school in 1960, Diepgen began studying law at the Free University of Berlin. During this time he was already politically active and joined the Christian Democratic Union (CDU) in 1962. As a member of the "Ring of Christian Democratic Students" (RCDS), he briefly chaired the "General Student Committee" (ASTA) of the Free University in 1963. After passing the first state examination in 1967, Diepgen worked as a trainee lawyer at the Berlin Higher Regional Court and was admitted to the bar in 1972 after the second state examination.

== Political career ==
=== Abgeordnetenhaus ===
In the Berlin CDU, Diepgen initially dealt primarily with questions of education policy. In 1971 he became a member of the state board, member of the program commission and executive chairman of the state. In the same year he moved into the Abgeordnetenhaus and in December 1980 he took over the chairmanship of the CDU parliamentary group as the successor to Heinrich Lummer. During Richard von Weizsäcker's tenure, Diepgen, as parliamentary group leader, played a key role in securing parliamentary policy for the Senate.

=== Mayor of Berlin ===
==== West ====
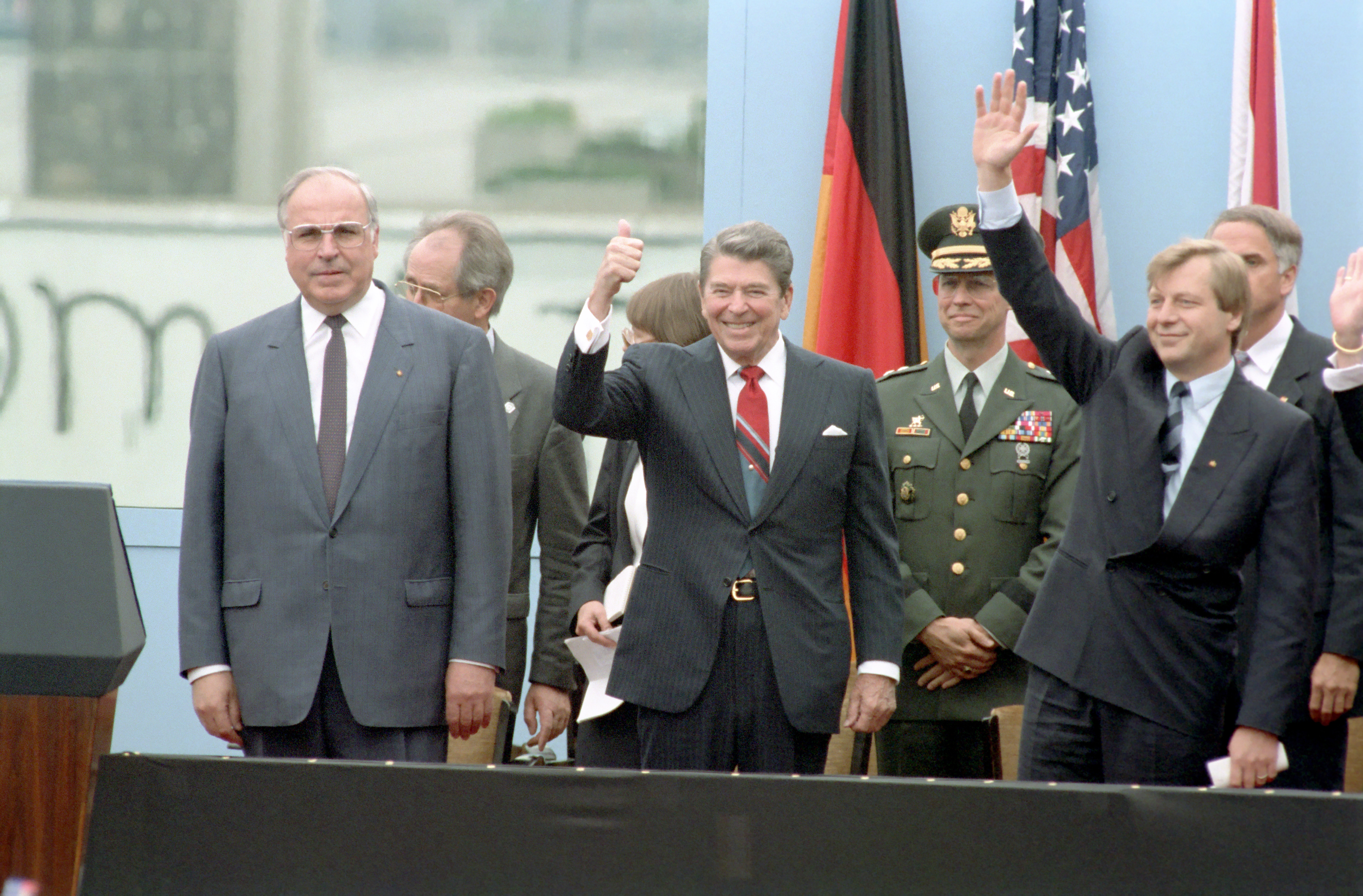
Diepgen (right, waving) with President Reagan at his 1987 "Tear down this wall!" speech

In February 1984, the West Berlin House of Deputies elected Diepgen, who ran unopposed, as the city's new mayor. He replaced Richard von Weizsäcker, who resigned to take the post of President of West Germany. Under his leadership, the CDU won the 1985 state elections. During Diepgen's tenure, he visited Washington, D.C. for meetings with President Ronald Reagan, Vice President George H. W. Bush, and National Security Advisor Frank Carlucci. Diepgens tenure also saw the glamorous celebrations for the city's 750th anniversary, with visits from Queen Elizabeth II and US President Ronald Reagan. The celebrations also saw corruption and party donation affairs, for the CDU-City councilors and senators. At the beginning of April 1986, Senators Lummer, Vetter and Franke had resigned. The anniversary is also notable for Diepgen being invited by East German leader Erich Honecker to come to East Berlin to join celebrations, an invitation later canceled.

In late 1988, Diepgen called a state election on relatively short notice, hoping to capitalize on his personal popularity and to pre-empt an assault on the Christian Democrats over local problems such as a housing shortage and unpopular national policies, including proposed changes in the health service. When the results came in on 29 January 1989, the centre-right coalition led by Eberhard Diepgen lost its majority. Although the CDU was just able to assert itself as the strongest party, the FDP failed, however, at the five percent hurdle. When efforts to form a grand coalition were unsuccessful, the SPD top candidate Walter Momper formed a government alliance with the Alternative List (AL), which had achieved a double-digit result for the first time. The CDU went into opposition, and Eberhard Diepen returned to the position of leader of the opposition.

==== Unified ====
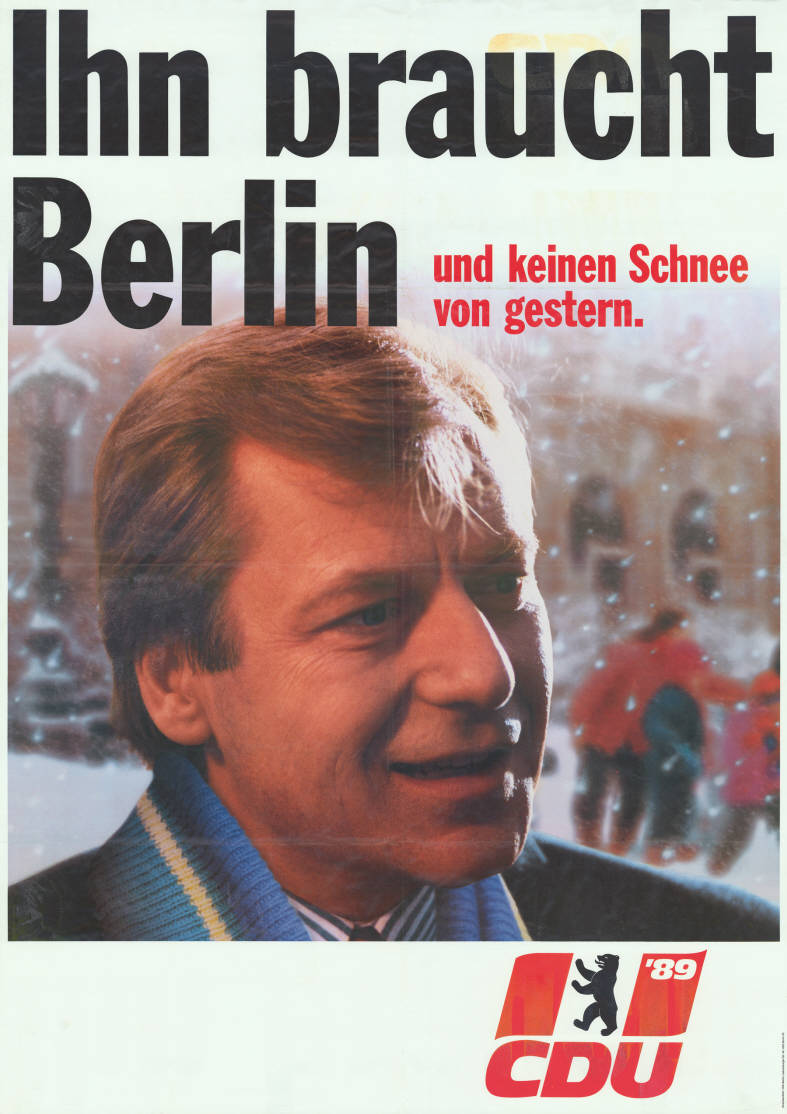
"Berlin needs him, not yesterday's news", a 1989 campaign poster

With the re-unification of Germany in October 1990, East and West Berlin re-united and the four-power status of the city expired. The first state elections of the united Berlin took place on 2 December 1990 and resulted in the CDU reasserting itself as the strongest party with 40.3 percent of the vote. As the former CDU-FDP coalition were three short of a majority, Diepgen formed a grand coalition with the SPD. On 24 January 1991, the Abgeordnetenhaus elected Diepgen mayor. Diepgen immediately initiated the relocation of the seat of the governing mayor and the Senate Chancellery from Schöneberg to Berlin's town hall in the Mitte district.

The move of the Bundestag and Federal Government to Berlin also fell during his second term of office. Interestingly, Berlin was among the states that voted in 1991 to keep the Bundesrat in Bonn, despite the decision to move the Bundestag and most government agencies to Berlin; the Bundesrat was eventually moved to the new capital. Also in 1991, Diepgen ordered the removal of a 3.5-tonne sculpture of Lenin, wanting to rid the city of an icon of a "dictatorship where people were persecuted and murdered."

In May 1996, Diepgen – together with the Federal Minister of Transport Matthias Wissmann and the Minister-President of Brandenburg Manfred Stolpe – committed to Schönefeld as the site for the new Berlin Brandenburg Airport on 28 May 1996. This so-called consensus decision was later affirmed by the respective state legislatures.

In 1996, Diepgen also campaigned in favor of the ultimately unsuccessful referendum to unite Berlin and Brandenburg he had spearheaded with Stolpe.

In 1999, news media first reported about a dispute between Diepgen and the U.S. Department of State over American demands for special security treatment for its new Berlin embassy not sought by other countries that had built embassies in the same area, including Britain and France. As a result, the construction of the embassy was delayed over several years by a dispute over how large a buffer zone it requires for security.

Amid the revelations of the CDU donations scandal in early 2000, Diepgen opposed Angela Merkel as new chairwoman of the party. On 6 July 2000, Diepgen signed a treaty with Matheus Shikongo, the Mayor of Windhoek, on a twin city partnership between the two municipalities. In September 2000, Diepgen pardoned two former members of the East German Politburo, Günter Schabowski and Günther Kleiber, who were jailed for their role in East Germany's shoot-to-kill policy at the Berlin Wall. In June 2001, the Social Democrats withdrew from Diepgen's administration and tabled a motion of no-confidence in Diepgen, accusing him of mismanagement and corruption. Diepgen resigned, and Klaus Wowereit became acting mayor. Ahead of the 2002 federal elections, Diepgen resigned as chairman of the CDU in Berlin after having failed to secure the top position on the party's list for the elections. He was succeeded by Joachim Zeller.

== Life after politics ==
Following his resignation in 2001, Diepgen joined the Berlin office of German law firm Thümmel, Schütze & Partner.

In addition, Diepgen has held various paid and unpaid positions, including the following:

- Ernst Reuter Archives, Member of the Board of Trustees
- Evangelical Academy Berlin, chairman of the Board of Trustees
- Friends of the Academy of the Arts, Member
- Gegen Vergessen – Für Demokratie, deputy chairman of the Board
- Konrad Adenauer Foundation, Member
- Otto Benecke Foundation, chairman of the Board of Trustees
- Synanon Foundation, Member of the Board of Trustees
- Zoological Gardens of Berlin, chairman of the Board of Trustees (since 2010)

Diepgen was a CDU delegate to the Federal Conventions for the purpose of electing the President of Germany in 2017 and 2022.

== Controversy ==
In 1986, Diepgen acknowledged accepting 50,000 West German marks, or about $21,000, from real estate investor Kurt Franke without having reported the amount as a party contribution as demanded by law. The Mayor later added that the total might have been 75,000 marks. As part of the bribery allegations, a total of 37 businessmen and politicians were under investigation, and more than 100 offices and homes were searched.

At the funeral of actress Marlene Dietrich in 1992, a simple graveside service at Städtischer Friedhof III, Diepgen was booed by Berliners who had been angered and disappointed by the city's failure to mount a formal tribute.

Diepgen did not attend the inauguration of Memorial to the Murdered Jews of Europe, stating his agenda was too full to make it. He had backed a plan for a far smaller stone memorial inscribed simply with the words Thou Shalt not Kill proposed by theologian Richard Schröder, saying that its precision, dignity and modesty gave it more power than Peter Eisenman's project.

== Selected awards ==
- Grand Cross of the Order of Merit of the Federal Republic of Germany (1999)
- Honorary Knight Commander of the Order of the British Empire (1994)

== See also ==
- Timeline of Berlin, 1980s–2000s

Political offices
Preceded by Richard von Weizsäcker	Mayor of West Berlin; 1984–1989	Succeeded by Walter Momper
Preceded by Walter Momper	Mayor of Berlin; 1991–2001	Succeeded by Klaus Wowereit
