= Gwen Lister =

Namibian journalist

- Born: 5 December 1953 (age 72); East London, Cape Province, Union of South Africa
- Occupation: Journalist
- Organization(s): Windhoek Observer (1978–84); The Namibian (1985–present)
- Known for: Founding editor of The Namibian; Press freedom activism, opposition to apartheid

Gwen Lister (born 5 December 1953) is a Namibian journalist, publisher, anti-apartheid and press freedom activist.

== Early life ==
Lister was born in East London. Growing up under the apartheid system, she resolved to fight it as an adult, and concluded that South West Africa would be a more effective place to do so than South Africa. She attended University of Cape Town in 1975, receiving a bachelor's degree. After graduation, she went to work as a journalist at Namibia's Windhoek Advertiser as a political correspondent. She later left the paper after interference in her reporting by her editors.

== Independent journalism ==
She and fellow journalist Hannes Smith began the independent weekly Windhoek Observer in 1978. As political editor, Lister wanted to give SWAPO, Namibia's liberation movement, "a 'human face', showing the people, including whites, that they were not the 'terrorists' and 'communists' and the 'black threat' that the colonial regime made them out to be through their blanket propaganda." She also criticised South Africa's apartheid practices in Namibia, drawing the government's anger. The Observer was officially banned in May 1984 after Lister travelled to Zambia to report on Namibian independence talks. Though the ban was lifted after an appeal to Pretoria's Publications Appeal Board, Observer management demoted her for having brought it on, triggering Lister's resignation and a walkout of the newspaper's staff.

Following her resignation, Lister did freelance work for BBC News and for South Africa's Capital Radio 604. In December 1984, Lister exposed a document authorising the interception of her mail by South African authorities, causing her to be arrested and detained for a week under the Official Secrets Act. The Austria-based International Press Institute (IPI) described the arrest as "an obvious attempt to stop her from setting up a new paper". Police confiscated her passport and required her to report three times a week.

In August 1985, Lister began a new independent newspaper, The Namibian. Her reporting on human rights abuses by South African forces brought new anger from the government and an advertising boycott by the white business community. In 1987, South African authorities banned the paper from printing a photograph of the corpse of an insurgent strapped to an armoured personnel carrier; Lister challenged the ban in court.

In 1991, a mercenary for the Civil Cooperation Bureau — a South African government hit squad—who had been arrested for the murder of SWAPO activist Anton Lubowski stated that he had also been sent to Namibia to poison Lister. The Namibian office was shot at and tear gassed, and in October 1988, was firebombed by an Afrikaner vigilante group called the White Wolves. In the same year, she was detained for several days without charge after publishing a government document proposing new police powers in Namibia; she was four months pregnant at the time.

The same year, Lister co-chaired the UNESCO conference on Free, Independent and Pluralistic African Media, which had the Windhoek Declaration as one of its results. During this time, Lister also co-founded the Media Institute of Southern Africa (MISA), serving a term as its chairwoman.

In March 2011, after 26 years as The Namibian's editor, Lister was succeeded by Tangeni Amupadhi.

== Awards and recognition ==
Lister won several international media awards for her work. In 1992, she received an International Press Freedom Award from the US-based Committee to Protect Journalists, recognising journalists "who have courageously provided independent news coverage and viewpoints under difficult circumstances". Harvard University awarded her its Nieman Fellowship for mid-career journalists in 1996. In 1997, she was awarded the MISA Press Freedom Award. The Media Institute of Southern Africa awarded Lister for having "almost single-handedly kept up the mantle of press freedom in Namibia."

In 2000, IPI named her one of 50 World Press Freedom Heroes of the previous fifty years. In 2004 she received the Courage in Journalism Award from the International Women's Media Foundation.

== Personal life ==
Lister published her memoirs Comrade Editor: On life, journalism and the birth of Namibia in 2021. Lister married twice, Johnny 'JJ' Snyman in 1979, with whom she had her son Shane (born 1980), and Mark Verbaan in 1988, with whom she had her daughter Liberty (born 1988). She divorced her second husband in 2000 and started a lesbian relationship with artist Jo Rogge.

She is a fan of the sport squash since the age of 49, and was named the patron of the Namibian Squash Association.

== Bibliography ==
- Lister, Gwen (2021). Comrade Editor. On Life, Journalism and the Birth of a Nation. Tafelberg. ISBN 978-0-624-0-9256-8.
