= Insight Namibia =

insight Namibia is a monthly journal published in Namibia. The magazine was first published in September 2004. Its headquarters is in Windhoek. It covers current political, economic and social affairs and is owned and edited by Tangeni Amupadhi. insight Namibia is perceived to be critical of government. Its political coverage has received several journalism awards.
