= New Era (Namibia) =

Namibian newspaper

- Front page of 31 October 2016 issue
- Type: Daily newspaper
- Owner: New Era Publication Corporation
- Editor: Festus Nakatana
- Founded: 1992
- Headquarters: Windhoek, Namibia
- Circulation: 9,000 daily 11,000 Fridays
- Website: neweralive.na

The New Era is a daily national newspaper owned by the government of Namibia. The newspaper is one of four daily national newspapers in the country, the others being The Namibian (English and Oshiwambo), Die Republikein (Afrikaans) and Allgemeine Zeitung (German).

New Era was created by the New Era Publications Corporation Act of 1992. According to Ullamaija Kivikuru, it copied the format of The Namibian in order to establish credibility. The two newspapers still resemble each other in having long stories spread over several pages.

New Era has a usual circulation of 9,000, and up to 11,000 on Fridays. It was established as a weekly newspaper and was later published only bi-weekly. It has appeared daily since 2004. New Era is published in English and five indigenous languages: Otjiherero, Oshiwambo, Damara/Nama, Silozi, and Khwedam.

New Era is published by the New Era Publication Corporation, which is owned by the Government of Namibia. The Minister of Information and Communication Technology has the ability to appoint and discharge members of the board of directors. Several researchers report that government ministers have acted as direct owners of the newspaper, telephoning the editorial department about articles that have criticised them. Because of this, the newspaper is perceived to be SWAPO-friendly, and is "often reproached for being biased in favour of the government." However, a 2006 study by Swedish students found New Era to be "more critical and fierce" than The Namibian. However, this analysis was based on only two opinion pieces per newspaper.

The managing editor of New Era is Festus Nakatana.

== See also ==
- Media of Namibia
