= Namibia Press Agency =

National news agency of Namibia

Logo of the Namibia Press Agency

The Namibia Press Agency (NAMPA) is the national news agency of the Republic of Namibia. It was founded in 1987 under the name Namibia Press Association as a SWAPO partisan press agency, and resuscitated after independence under its current name in 1991. Its operation is regulated by the Namibia Press Agency Act of 1992. The state owned agency is responsible for news distribution and picture services to local and international customers. Up until now, the agency offers text and picture services, but no audio or video material. About 20 journalists and 30 other staff members work for NAMPA. Aside from its Windhoek headquarters, the agency has offices in Swakopmund, Gobabis, Ongwediva/Oshakati, Opuwo and Rundu. Most media in Namibia rely on the services of NAMPA, especially for international news.

In October 2002, the Committee to Protect Journalists asserted that NAMPA has "...long practiced self-censorship on contentious issues", while also accusing the Agency of being a government mouthpiece.

== See also ==
- Media of Namibia
