= Namibia Economist =

Weekly newspaper in Namibia

- Type: Daily newspaper
- Format: Digital
- Owner(s): Graphis, Printing, Publishing & Advertising cc
- Editor: Daniel Steinmann
- Founded: February 1991
- Language: English
- Headquarters: Windhoek
- Country: Namibia
- ISSN: 1028-9143
- Website: economist.com.na

The Namibia Economist is a Namibian newspaper published digitally that focuses on local business and financial topics. It is published exclusively in English. Its editor is Daniel Steinmann. First published in 1991, it appeared as a printed monthly newspaper.

The Namibia Economist published its last printed edition on 25 November 2016. The website was established in 2001 and continues.
