= Muesee Kazapua =

Namibian politician (born 1980)

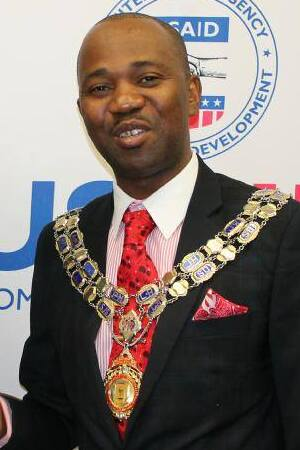
Kazapua in 2016

Muesee Kazapua (born 1980) is a SWAPO politician based in Windhoek, the capital of Namibia. He was the mayor of Windhoek from 2014 to 2019.

Kazapua attended Windhoek's Augustineum Secondary School and holds tertiary degrees in Youth Development, Local Government Administration, and Management. He is a member of the SWAPO Youth League and a former member of the Namibia National Students Organisation (NANSO). He also volunteered at the National Youth Council (NYC).
