= Windhoek Observer =

- Type: Daily e-paper
- Owner: Paragon Investment Holding
- Editor: Kuvee Kangueehi
- Founded: 1978
- Circulation: 45,000 (as of 2009)
- Website: www.observer.com.na

The Windhoek Observer is an English-language Saturday weekly newspaper, published in Namibia by Paragon Investment Holding. It is the country's oldest and largest circulating paper. As of 2009 it had a circulation of 45,000 copies.

The Windhoek Observer was founded in 1978 by Hannes Smith and Gwen Lister. Lister was the political editor and wanted to give SWAPO, Namibia's liberation movement, "a 'human face', showing the people, including whites, that they were not the 'terrorists' and 'communists' and the 'black threat' that the colonial regime made them out to be through their blanket propaganda."

The newspaper was officially banned in May 1984 after Lister travelled to Zambia to report on Namibian independence talks. Though the ban was lifted after an appeal to Pretoria's Publications Appeal Board, Observer management demoted her for having brought it on, triggering Lister's resignation and a walkout of the newspaper's staff. The following year, Lister began a new independent newspaper, The Namibian.

Smith then ran the Windhoek Observer as a one-man operation, calling himself "reporter-in-chief". His daughter, Yanna Erasmus, later joined him at the newspaper. Smith adopted a "hard-line editorial stance against those in authority" and "did not bow to the South African nor the SWAPO government."

After Smith's death in 2008, Erasmus took over as editor. The following year, the newspaper was sold to Paragon Investment Holding, and Kuvee Kangueehi was appointed editor.
