= Allgemeine Zeitung (Namibia) =

Newspaper published in Namibia

- Front page of the Allgemeine Zeitung
- Type: Daily, Monday-Friday
- Owner: Namibia Media Holdings
- Managing editor: Frank Steffen
- Founded: 1916
- Language: German
- Headquarters: Windhoek, Namibia
- Circulation: 4,000
- Website: www.az.com.na

The Allgemeine Zeitung (AZ, literally in English 'General Newspaper') founded in 1916, is the oldest daily newspaper in Namibia and the only German-language daily in Africa to survive World War I.

== Profile ==
The Allgemeine Zeitung is a Namibian newspaper. It is written by 10 editors; most of the staff members are either born or naturalized Namibians. It is read mostly by German-speaking Namibians (~15,000). The newspaper leans liberal-conservative.

The circulation of the AZ stood at about 5,000 copies (Mondays to Thursdays, 12 to 16 pages) to about 6,000 copies (Fridays, up to 32 pages) in the 2000s and 2010s. A few hundred papers are sent to South Africa and some (mostly the Friday release) to Namibian expatriates and to Germany. Once a month (usually on the first Tuesday of the month), an extra for tourists is added. The circulation then increased to about 12,000 copies. In line with the general decrease of newspaper readership in the 2010s, there are now about 4,000 copies printed each day.

In 1991 Democratic Media Holdings (DMH) bought the Newspaper. The managing editor since 2018 is Frank Steffan. He modernized the design, which increased demand and led to initial profit for the Allgemeine Zeitung. DMH also prints and releases Die Republikein, which is written in Afrikaans, and the Namibian Sun. All editorial content in the newspaper is written in German, a common minority language in Namibia which had attempts to revitalize as the official language.

In line with shareholder changes and modernized media approaches, DMH changed their name to Namibia Media Holdings and has since then not only re-aligned its printing, but has migrated into the internet in no uncertain manner. The Allgemeine Zeitung is part of that modern approach designed to allow the only remaining German daily outside the European German-speaking community, to remain relevant in the future.

Frank Steffen was appointed as Editor-in-Chief in 2018 and has since allowed to also post articles in the English language to be posted on the AZ's internet pages from time to time, so as to ensure full coverage of the Namibian news front to the benefit of the German-speaking community of Namibia.

== History ==
The Allgemeine Zeitung was founded on 22 July 1916 under the name Der Kriegsbote (literally 'The War Envoy') and reported on the events of the First World War. After Germany was defeated and lost German South West Africa (now Namibia) to South Africa, the name was changed to Allgemeine Zeitung on 1 July 1919.

In 1937, the newspaper was bought by the publisher John Meinert Ltd. The newspaper was released daily, except for Sundays, with a circulation of 1,800 copies. Most of the readers were Germans from Windhoek and surroundings. At that time the tagline was changed to indicate the intent to "support German national interests". For a short while starting in 1939, the newspaper was released under the name Deutscher Beobachter ('German Observer').

At the same time, smaller newspapers were released, such as Der Farmer ('The Farmer'), Das Volksblatt ('The People's Paper') owned by the Workers Association of South Africa, the Karakulzüchter ('The Karakul Stockman'), founded in 1933, and the Heimat ('Home'), a German paper for Africa's evangelical community.

In 1958, Kurt Dahlmann, Germany's highest-decorated Jabo pilot of World War II, was hired as editor-in-chief. Writing under the pen name Stachus, symbolised as a potted cactus with an oblique dip pen, Dahlmann was adamant about the fleeting nature of apartheid. He wrote many editorials on this topic, suggesting ways that Namibia and South Africa should address the issue of inevitable black rule in both countries.

In 1978, when the AZ and the Windhoek Advertiser were the only independent newspapers in South West Africa, Diether Lauenstein purchased both papers. Dahlmann alleged that the money came from the regime in Pretoria; Klaus Dierks states that the German right-wing Hanns Seidel Foundation was the source of the financial backing. Dahlmann was fired and Lauenstein took over the editorship himself with the aim of bringing the paper "on a more conservative, pro-South African, pro-Apartheid and anti-Independence course". In 1981 Hans Feddersen became editor-in-chief.

== Literature ==
- Karl Bömer: Handbuch der Weltpresse: Eine Darstellung des Zeitungswesens aller Länder. Leipzig, Frankfurt am Main: Armanen-Verlag, 1937.
- Regina Reinsperger: Diether Lauenstein und die Apartheid [Diether Lauenstein and Apartheid]. Allgemeine Zeitung via yumpu.com, last accessed on 2 October 2017

== See also ==
- Media of Namibia
