= Republikein =

Afrikaans-language newspaper published daily in Namibia

- Type: Daily Newspaper
- Publisher: Namibia Media Holdings
- Editor-in-chief: Henriette Lamprecht
- Political alignment: Liberal conservative
- Language: Afrikaans
- Headquarters: Windhoek
- Circulation: 18,000 copies (2007)
- Sister newspapers: Allgemeine Zeitung, Namibian Sun
- Website: www.republikein.com.na

Republikein (lit. 'Republican') is an Afrikaans-language newspaper published daily in Namibia and the country's largest Afrikaans-language newspaper in terms of print circulation. Its editor-in-chief is Henriette Lamprecht.

== History ==
The newspaper was founded by Dirk Mudge in December 1977 under the name Die Republikein. It served as a mouthpiece of the Republican Party of Namibia (RP) at that time. The first editor was Johannes Petrus Spies. When the RP joined the Democratic Turnhalle Alliance (DTA), a merger of several parties, the newspaper became the unofficial organ of the DTA. In 1991, Republikein was bought by the Democratic Media Holdings (DMH). After several disputes between DTA and DMH during the 1990s, the media house broke with the DTA in 1997 and aspires to increase editorial independence since.

== Online edition ==
The Republikein offers an online edition of the newspaper, which mainly reflected the contents of the print version, but is complemented with additional contents such as video material. In August 2011, Republikein Online had around 65,000 unique page visits.
