= Media Institute of Southern Africa =

NGO promoting independent and pluralistic media

- Founded: 1992
- Headquarters: Windhoek, Khomas Region, Namibia
- Key people: Gwen Lister
- Website: www.misa.org

Media Institute of Southern Africa (MISA) is a non-governmental organisation with members in 11 of the Southern Africa Development Community (SADC) countries. Officially launched in September 1992, MISA focuses primarily on the need to promote free, independent and pluralistic media, as envisaged in the 1991 Declaration of Windhoek.

MISA seeks ways in which to promote the free flow of information and co-operation between media workers, as a principal means of nurturing democracy and human rights in Africa. The role of MISA is primarily that of a coordinator, facilitator and communicator, and for this reason MISA aims to work together with all like-minded organisations and individuals to achieve a genuinely free and pluralistic media in southern Africa.

A Secretariat, based in Windhoek, Namibia, coordinates:

- Advocacy: To conduct advocacy in accordance to the organisation's mission, act on media freedom violations and conduct research as the basis of specialised and popularised publications.
- News Exchange: To facilitate news exchange (to make sure that local news from the independent media is made accessible to the whole region and that regional news from the independent media is made accessible to the world)

MISA has national chapters in Angola, Botswana, Lesotho, Malawi, Mozambique, Namibia, South Africa, Swaziland, Tanzania, Zambia and Zimbabwe.

MISA is a member of the International Freedom of Expression Exchange (IFEX), a global network of non-governmental organisations that works to defend and promote the right to freedom of expression.

It also belongs to the IFEX Tunisia Monitoring Group, a coalition of 16 free expression groups that lobbies Tunisia to improve its human rights record.

== Chapters ==
MISA Malawi: The Malawi chapters arranges training courses for members. In 2025 MISA Malawi announced a drive to reduce misinformation before the 2025 national elections. Vice-chair Chisomo Ngulube said that they would have an i-verify system to debunk misinformation.
