= Namibian Sun =

Daily tabloid in Namibia

- Front page of 11 October 2016 issue
- Type: Daily newspaper
- Owner(s): Namibia Media Holdings
- Editor: Toivo Ndjebela
- Founded: 2007
- Circulation: 36,000 (2007, planned)
- Website: namibiansun.com

The Namibian Sun is a daily newspaper in Namibia. It was launched on 20 September 2007 as a weekly tabloid newspaper published on Thursdays. The initial print run was planned to be 36,000 copies. The paper publishes mostly in English with some pages in Oshiwambo and targets a readership aged between 18 and 40. It has been published daily since 2010.

The Namibian Sun is published by Namibia Media Holdings (formerly Democratic Media Holdings) which also publishes Allgemeine Zeitung and Die Republikein. While AZ has a German-speaking readership, and Republikein targets Afrikaans speakers, the Namibian Sun focuses on an English-speaking audience. It is similar to the South African Daily Sun in layout and features.
