= The Namibian =

Independent newspaper in Namibia

- Type: Daily newspaper
- Format: Broadsheet
- Owner: Free Press of Namibia
- Editor-in-chief: Tangeni Amupadhi
- Founded: 30 August 1985
- Language: English, Oshiwambo
- Headquarters: Windhoek West, Windhoek
- Website: www.namibian.com.na

The Namibian is the largest daily newspaper in Namibia. Founded in 1985, it is published in English and Oshiwambo. The paper has come into conflict with the government of Namibia in the past due to its critical coverage of government leaders.

== History ==
The newspaper was established in 1985 by journalist Gwen Lister as a weekly newspaper reliant on support of donors, which aimed to promote Namibian independence from South Africa. Its first edition appeared on 30 August of that year with a print run of 10,000. The Namibian became a daily newspaper on 1 April 1989. It is owned by the private trust Free Press of Namibia, managed by its founding editor.

On the 15th anniversary of its foundation, United Nations Secretary-General Kofi Annan praised the newspaper: "The Namibian worked courageously in difficult and often dangerous conditions. Since then, it has contributed immeasurably to press freedom and nation-building in Namibia. Throughout, it has maintained its integrity and independent stance."

== Relations to government ==
=== Prior to Namibian independence ===
The newspaper exposed human rights violations by South Africa's occupying forces and was thus perceived as overly critical and pro-SWAPO by the South African government. Even the name of the newspaper irritated the South African administration as they preferred the land to be called South West Africa, whereas Namibia was a notion closely related to the independence movement.

There were several incidents of violence against The Namibian's offices, leased from anti-apartheid activist and architect Kerry McNamara, in the months after its foundation. Shooting at the building necessitated the installation of bullet-proof glass, and there were several firebombing and teargassing attacks. The newspaper offices were attacked by the Afrikaner white supremacist Wit Wolwe (Afrikaans: White Wolves) vigilante group in October 1988. The newspaper's offices were almost burned down. South Africa's Civil Cooperation Bureau planned to poison editor Lister, the newspaper was boycotted by the white business community, and "journalists and sympathisers" of The Namibian were denied entry in shops all over the country.

=== After independence ===
The offices of the newspaper were again devastated by a phosphorus grenade attack shortly after Namibian independence in 1990 by a right-wing counterrevolutionary group whose plot to unseat SWAPO was covered by The Namibian. However, the critical approach of the newspaper was also disliked by the SWAPO government. Dirk Mudge, head of the South African-controlled government from 1978 to 1989 wrote at the occasion of the newspaper's 10th anniversary:

"During the past ten years [...] The Namibian [...] did not show particular understanding nor sympathy towards me personally and my political views. Cognisance must however, be taken of the fact that The Namibian is also prepared to take the present government and its leaders to task whenever necessary."

The unpopularity of the newspaper within government led to a boycott on 5 December 2000 which was overturned only on 30 August 2011, the newspaper's 26th anniversary. In the more than ten years in between, government offices were not allowed to advertise in the newspaper, and it was forbidden to buy copies of The Namibian with government funds.

== Characteristics ==
A noteworthy feature of The Namibian are the SMS pages called "What you're saying!". These pages dedicated to "short messages to the editor" allow citizens from all over Namibia to comment on and raise topics, since mobile phones are widespread and cheaper and easier than mail or internet. According to former editor Gwen Lister, The Namibian was the first newspaper to offer such an open forum for discussion via text message, since similar programmes at other media (e.g. in South Africa) only allowed comment on chosen articles.

The newspaper has offices in Windhoek, Swakopmund, Keetmanshoop, Rundu and Oshakati. The current editor of the newspaper is Tangeni Amupadhi. Until March 2011, the newspaper was headed by its founder Gwen Lister. Its circulation in 2010 was 40,000.

== See also ==
- Media of Namibia
