= Momper Senate =

Government cabinet of the city-state of Berlin

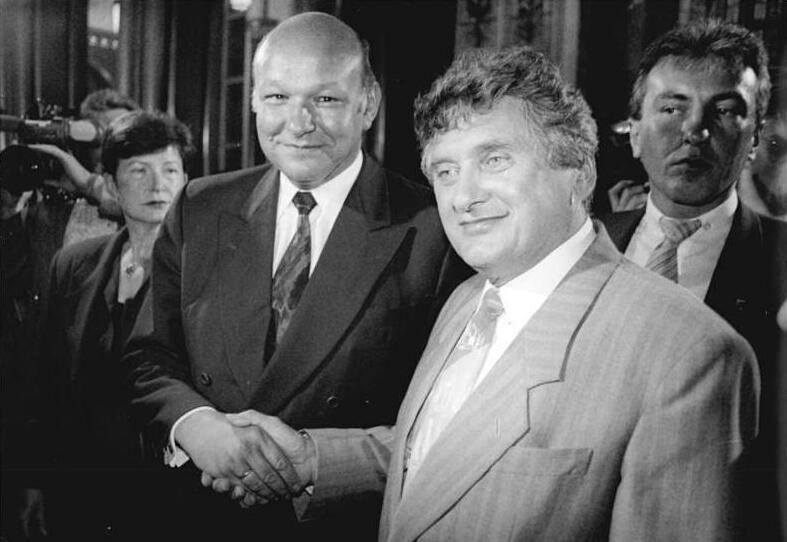
Walter Momper and Tino Schwierzina (May 6, 1990)

The Senate Momper held office from March 16, 1989, to January 24, 1991, initially as the government of West Berlin and, after German reunification on October 3, 1990, together with the East Berlin Magistrat Schwierzina as the government of the new Land Berlin. After the surprising election victory in the Election to the House of Representatives on January 29, 1989, the red-green coalition between the Berlin Social Democratic Party (SPD) and the Alternative List for Democracy and Environmental Protection (AL) replaced the previous CDU/FDP government under Eberhard Diepgen. Governing Mayor became Walter Momper (SPD). The SPD/AL alliance was the second red-green state government in Germany after the 3rd Börner government in Hesse (1985 to 1987).

The fall of the Berlin Wall marked a turning point both for Berlin and in the twenty-month term of office of the Senate. After the reunification of Germany and Berlin, Senate Momper held office for more than three months together with Magistrate Schwierzina as the government of Berlin as a whole. After ongoing conflicts, the AL left the coalition on November 15, 1990, two weeks before new elections to the House of Representatives were scheduled anyway. The reason for this was the battle of Mainzer Straße initiated by Erich Pätzold (SPD). In the first all-Berlin election to the House of Representatives on December 2, 1990, both the SPD and the AL suffered heavy losses.

== Prerequisites ==
=== The CDU/FDP Senate under Eberhard Diepgen ===
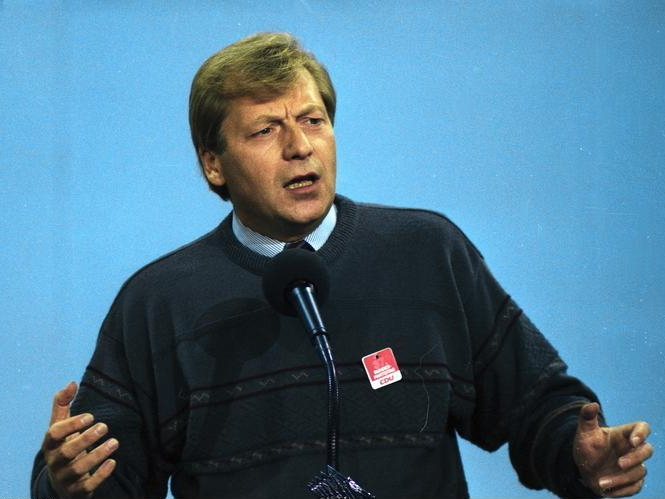
Eberhard Diepgen (1989)

In the former SPD headquarters in West Berlin, the CDU had been the strongest parliamentary group in the House of Representatives since 1975 and the governing mayor since 1981. The Social Democrats, who achieved their second-best result in Berlin's post-war history in the 1963 election with 61.9%, had suffered losses in almost every election since then. After Richard von Weizsäcker was elected Federal President in 1984, Eberhard Diepgen governed a CDU/FDP Senate. Diepgen, who was regarded as a less charismatic technocrat and string-puller, was clearly confirmed in the elections to the Berlin House of Representatives on March 10, 1985. The CDU was represented in the House of Representatives with 69 seats, the SPD received 48, the Alternative List 15 and the FDP 12.

The Antes scandal was uncovered throughout the entire 10th legislative period. Until the change of government in 1981, it had been the SPD that was mired in the so-called "red swamp" or "Berlin felt", from the Garski Affair to the Kreisel Affair and others. However, even Richard von Weizsäcker was unable to change the network of relationships between the public sector and the private sector in the island city; in his government declaration, he had fiercely criticized the established system of taking advantage and patronage of office as "party politics". On the contrary, the system of corruption became even more entrenched under the CDU government. The personal, extremely close network of a group of high-ranking CDU politicians, on which Diepgen's position was based, now proved to be part of this system. CDU building senator Klaus Franke and FDP environmental senator Horst Vetter had to take off their hats, while interior senator Heinrich Lummer also had to resign because of a previous collaboration with the NPD. The CDU trivialized the scandal and saw itself as the victim of a "smear campaign".

=== Election campaign ===
Despite all the scandals, Diepgen was relatively popular in Berlin, even if he was considered rather pale and far from enjoying the same level of reverence as von Weizsäcker, Willy Brandt or Ernst Reuter. Various polls showed that between the leading candidates Eberhard Diepgen and Walter Momper, around 60% of Berliners would have opted for Diepgen if they had been able to elect the governing mayor directly. He benefited from a dense series of major events on the occasion of the 750-year-celebration in 1987 and when West Berlin served as Cultural City of Europe in 1988, which seemed to overshadow Berlin's political problems and the CDU's affairs. The CDU relied entirely on the Mayor bonus. Most of the election posters showed a portrait of the governing mayor with the campaign slogan "Berlin needs him", later "Berlin wants him".

The SPD, on the other hand, avoided personalizing the election and did not particularly highlight its leading candidate Walter Momper, leader of the SPD parliamentary group since March 1985 and party chairman since June 1986, in the election campaign. It concentrated on traditionally social democratic policy areas. From 1987, campaigns began on rent control, the design of the land use plan, equality for women and against the health policy of the Bonn CDU/FDP coalition.

The election campaign became increasingly empty as election day approached. The slogans on the election posters seemed interchangeable and sometimes incomprehensible: "Happy new Berlin" (CDU), "Berlin is freedom" (SPD) or "A happy 1993" (FDP). Only the AL proactively took up issues that were important to the population, but relied on the alternative milieu and shied away from costly advertising measures. Shortly before the election, the far-right party Die Republikaner, which was running for the first time, polarized and polemicized with xenophobic and authoritarian accentuated television advertisements as well as an event dominated by the federal chairman Franz Schönhuber and accompanied by violent counter-demonstrations.

=== The attitude of the SPD and AL towards a red-green coalition before the election ===
As the CDU/FDP federal government under Helmut Kohl seemed to be inexorably losing its reputation in the Federal Republic, a mood for change was emerging and a red-green majority seemed possible in the federal elections in December 1990, an SPD/AL government in Berlin could have served as a test case for a red-green federal government. However, because it seemed almost inconceivable before the election that the SPD and the Alternative List would be able to make up the roughly 12% point deficit to the CDU/FDP government, the AL and even more so the Social Democrats went into the election campaign without having seriously considered a possible joint coalition.

In view of the predicted election result, it was easy for the SPD to rule out an alliance with the AL and thus reassure frightened voters. The AL, on the other hand, had decided to declare its willingness to cooperate with the Social Democrats after rejecting a possible coalition or even just toleration in the run-up to the 1985 election to the House of Representatives. The special insularity of West Berlin had led to the AL taking a special path vis-à-vis the federal Greens. It was particularly strong in the left-alternatives spectrum of the city, whereas the classic environmentalists had not played any particular role. In addition, the AL was formally independent of the federal party, even if it took on the role of a state association. The disputes between the Realos aiming for government participation and the Fundis focusing on fundamental opposition, which dominated and threatened to divide the federal party in the 1980s, never played such a significant role in the AL. Instead, the AL was regarded as a relatively homogeneous, yet decidedly left-wing regional association that placed basic democratic decision-making processes a particularly high priority.

=== Polls before the election ===
Dates	CDU	SPD	AL	FDP	REP
25 January 1989	41%	36%	11%	7%	
c. 25 January 1989	40%	36%	10%	8%	3%
10 January 1989	43%	34%	11%	9%	
c. 28 December 1988	43%	38%	10%	6%	

Despite the Berlin CDU's distress caused by the Antes scandal, polls predicted a clear majority for the CDU/FDP coalition just three weeks before election day. It was only a few days before the election that there were signs of a neck-and-neck race between the political camps, albeit still with a black-yellow majority and a clear lead for the CDU over the SPD. According to an Infas survey commissioned by the SFB magazine Kontraste, the situation on the labor market was the most important issue for 24% of respondents, environmental protection for 23% and housing construction for 20%.Two weeks earlier, a survey commissioned by Stern had revealed that rents and housing shortages were the most important issues, followed by foreigners and university overcrowding.

=== Election to the House of Representatives on January 29, 1989 ===
	Second votes	Mandate
CDU	37,7	55
SPD	37,3	55
AL	11,8	17
REP	7,5	11
FDP	3,9	–

The election to the House of Representatives on January 29, 1989 caused surprises in several respects: The CDU, whose victory had been considered certain, suffered a heavy defeat and collapsed by 8.7% points with 37.7% of the vote. The SPD, on the other hand, gained 4.9% to 37.3% and, with 55 parliamentary seats, won as many seats as the CDU. Together with the likewise strengthened Alternative List (11.8%, +1.2%), this resulted in a clear majority for the Red-Greens, as the FDP - also surprisingly - the CDU's previous coalition partner, with 3.9% (-4.6%), clearly failed to re-enter the House of Representatives. The third result, which had not been predicted in any way and was taken note of with shock, was the entry of the Republicans, who received 7.5% of the vote and thus eleven seats at the first attempt.

== Coalition building ==
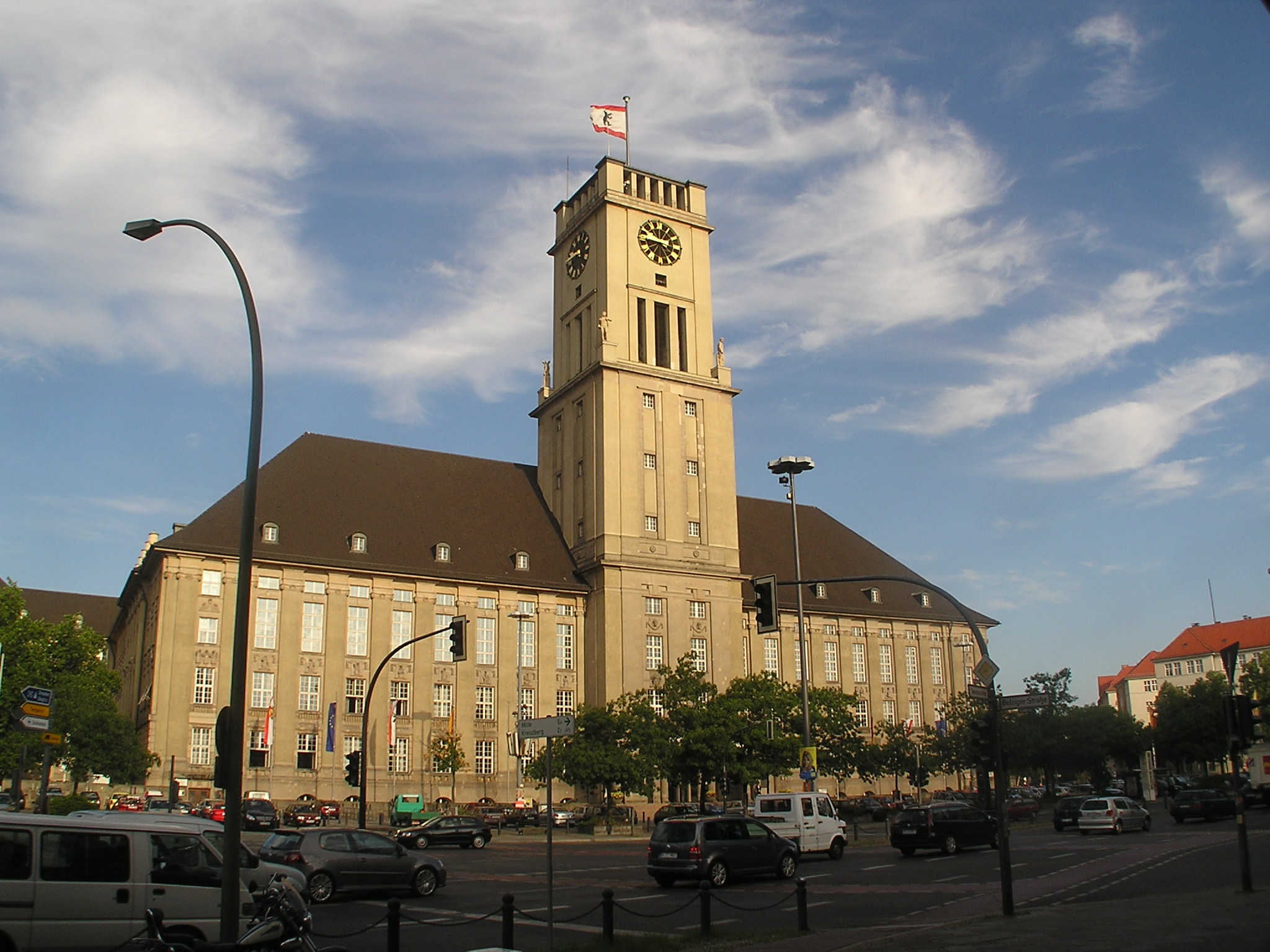
Schöneberg Town Hall, seat of the Governing Mayor and the Senate until 1991 and of the House of Representatives until 1993

=== Coalition negotiations ===
On the evening of the election, Walter Momper rejected a renewed offer of cooperation from the Alternative List with the remark that it was "not fit to govern". A grand coalition emerged immediately after the election. On the other hand, the SPD and the AL had achieved a clear majority with strong gains, while the previous ruling coalition had clearly been voted out of office. An SPD/CDU alliance as the only alternative to that with the AL therefore had no majority among the SPD base, especially as polls showed that only 17.2% of Berliners wanted such a government, while 23.9% were in favor of red-green.

After a few days, informal talks took place, in which Walter Momper, the Kreuzberg district mayor Gerd Wartenberg and the former state chairman Jürgen Egert took part on the SPD side, as well as Bernd Köppl, Harald Wolf and Renate Künast for the Alternative List. Hans-Christian Ströbele, one of the most prominent AL members, exponent of the left wing of the party and spokesperson for the federal party in 1990–91, was only present at a few meetings. The AL Council of Delegates criticized this type of discussion, as it contradicted its grassroots democratic principle, but ultimately approved the preliminary negotiations. On February 11, 1989, a general meeting of members, the party's highest decision-making body, voted in favour of official coalition negotiations with a majority of 99.8% of those present. The AL entered the coalition negotiations that began on February 13, 1989, without any recognizable strategy or substantive preparation. The only basis for negotiations was the entire AL program, which was tailored entirely to an opposition parliamentary group and consisted of a collection of individual demands.

Walter Momper held coalition talks with Eberhard Diepgen in parallel to the negotiations with the AL. Addressing the AL, he formulated as "touchstones" the recognition of the state's monopoly on the use of force, the Rights and Presence of the Allies in Berlin and Berlin's ties to the Federation, which he made a precondition for a coalition. It was not easy for the AL to agree, as these were issues that were controversial within the party. By agreeing, Momper succeeded in disciplining the AL from the outset and was also able to justify his own change of course.

The coalition agreement was signed at the beginning of March 1989. The AL was able to assert itself in the coalition agreement, particularly in the area of ecological urban renewal, which became a guiding principle of the coalition. It was to prove problematic that the 30 or so most controversial issues were included in the coalition agreement as "test orders", meaning that important points of disagreement were postponed unresolved.

The result of the negotiations was approved at a general meeting of the AL on March 11 and 12, 1989 with an astonishingly clear majority of 80% of the votes and in an almost euphoric mood. Motions to tolerate an SPD minority government instead of entering into a coalition (Harald Wolf and Birgit Arkenstette from the Left Forum had tabled this proposal as a minority vote of the negotiating commission) or to enter into renegotiations with the SPD (this motion was tabled by Dieter Kunzelmann and others) were left without a chance. Also on March 12, a special SPD party conference approved a coalition with the AL.

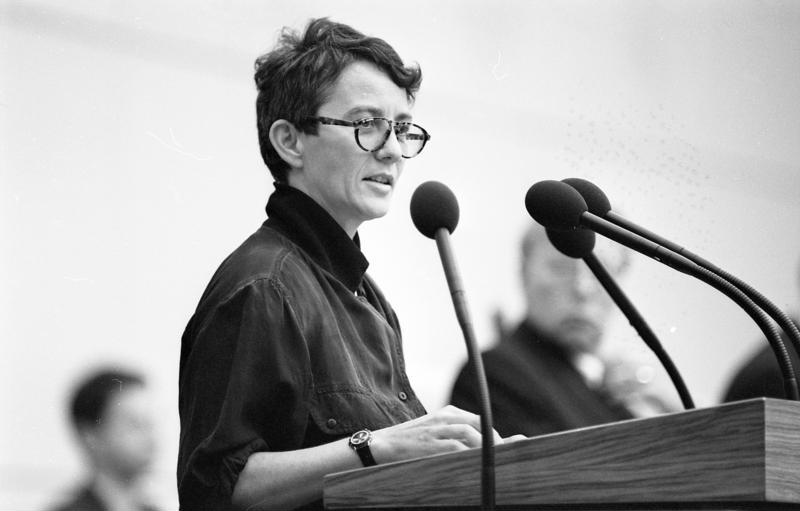
Anne Klein, one of eight women in the Senate

=== Staffing of the Senate ===
Only after the substantive negotiations had been fully concluded did those on the structure of the departments begin. The AL claimed the environment portfolio and received it as the Senate Office for Urban Development and Environmental Protection. The women's portfolio was also important to the Alternative List. In return, it relinquished the right to appoint a female mayor, i.e. a deputy head of government. This function was taken over by Ingrid Stahmer, Senator for Health and Social Affairs from the SPD. The third senate office given to the AL was that of education, vocational training and sport. This meant that all the traditional portfolios went to the Social Democrats. According to Christian Ströbele, the AL had not made any demands in this regard, as it "simply did not believe it could do so". Hilde Schramm became vice-president of the House of Representatives, and the AL also provided four State Secretaries and, with Ingvield Kiehle, a Deputy Senate Press Officer.

With the exception of the former health senator Erich Pätzold, who now became interior senator, and the new economics senator Peter Mitzscherling, 1974 to 1980 Senate Director for Labor, the SPD refrained from considering former Senate members. The new Head of the Senate Chancellery, Dieter Schröder, had experience as a member of the Senate and was most recently a professor of international law. The Mayor and Senator for Health and Social Affairs, Ingrid Stahmer, was previously a City Councillor, while the Senator for Justice, Jutta Limbach, was a law professor at Free University. Norbert Meisner, previously head of studies at the Jugendsozialwerk and representative of the left wing of the party, became Senator for Finance, Wolfgang Nagel was until then construction policy spokesman for the SPD parliamentary group and editor at the German Institute of Urban Affairs. The journalist Anke Martiny-Glotz moved from the Bonn SPD party executive to Berlin as Senator for Culture, and the social scientist and Vice President of Freie Universität Barbara Riedmüller-Seel became Senator for Science. Horst Wagner, Berlin IG-Metall chairman from the right wing of the SPD, took over the Senate Office for Labor, Transport and Works, and Heide Pfarr, a former law professor and vice president of University of Hamburg who grew up in Berlin, became Senator for Federal Affairs. Most members of the Senate therefore had little administrative experience.

At the AL general meeting, the actual personnel debate only began after the coalition agreement had been approved. Heidi Bischoff-Pflanz, chairwoman of the parliamentary group and a recognized left-wing integration figure, was considered for the post of Senator for Women, Youth and Family Affairs, but she declined. In the end, three largely unknown specialist politicians were agreed upon, none of whom were members of the parliamentary group or even the AL and were therefore not expected to bring internal party conflicts into the government's work. Michaele Schreyer, economist, research assistant of the Green parliamentary group in the Bundestag and the only female senator who was a member of the (West German) Green Party, took over the important cross-sectional portfolio for urban development and environmental protection. The women's portfolio was filled by the lawyer and former research assistant to Waltraud Schoppe in the Bundestag, Anne Klein, who prevailed in a fierce debate against the AL women's politician Helga Hentschel . Senator for Education, Vocational Training and Sport was the deputy Berlin GEW chairwoman Sybille Volkholz. Both were independent. The left-wing coalition sceptic Harald Wolf was entrusted with the task of strengthening coordination between the party, parliamentary group and senators as a member of the executive committee.

With eight female senators and five male senators as well as the governing mayor, the Momper Senate was the first German state government with a majority of women. The female senators of both parties met at Heide Pfarr's home for a so-called "witches' breakfast" before each Senate session. The House of Representatives elected the new Senate on March 16, 1989, with the special Berlin feature that each senator had to be elected individually by the House of Representatives.

=== List of senators and state secretaries ===
Institution	Name	Party	State Secretaries
Governing Mayor	Walter Momper	SPD	Dieter Schröder (Chef der Senatskanzlei, SPD)
Mayor	Ingrid Stahmer	SPD	
Senator for Health and Social Affairs	Ingrid Stahmer	SPD	Armin Tschoepe, Ursula Kleinert
Senator for Justice	Jutta Limbach	SPD	Wolfgang Schomburg
Senator for Education, Vocational Training and Sport	Sybille Volkholz	non-party for AL	Hans-Jürgen Kuhn (AL), Jürgen Dittberner
Senator for Science and Research	Barbara Riedmüller-Seel	SPD	Hans Kremendahl (SPD)
Senator for Labor, Transport and Public Enterprises	Horst Wagner	SPD	Gerhard Schneider
Senator for Finance	Norbert Meisner	SPD	
Senator for Building and Housing	Wolfgang Nagel	SPD	Hans Görler (SPD)
Senator for Economics	Peter Mitzscherling	SPD	Jörg Rommerskirchen (SPD)
Senator for Home Affairs	Erich Pätzold	SPD	Detlef Borrmann
Senator for Urban Development and Environmental Protection	Michaele Schreyer	Die Grünen für AL	Klaus-Martin Groth (parteilos für AL)
Senator for Federal Affairs	Heide Pfarr	SPD	
Senator for Cultural Affairs	Anke Martiny	SPD	Hanns Kirchner
Senator for Women, Youth and Family Affairs	Anne Klein	non-party for AL	Helga Hentschel (AL), Gerd Harms (AL)

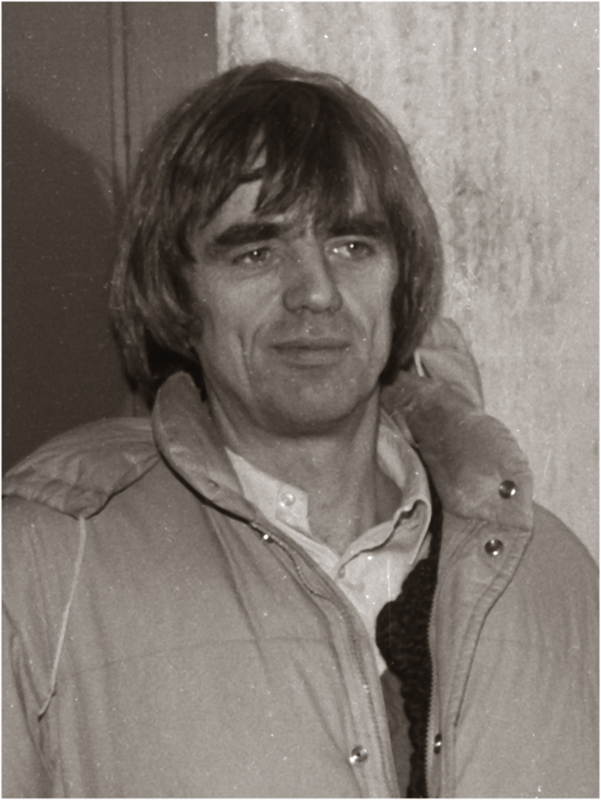
Hans-Christian Ströbele (1987)

=== Public reactions ===
As the Alternative List insisted on maximum transparency from the outset, the public was always well informed about the status of the coalition negotiations. During the coalition negotiations, a large number of initiatives and institutions from the left-wing alternative milieu submitted demands to the AL that were driven by individual interests. There was no lack of advice from West Germany either. For example, Jutta Ditfurth, an exponent of the Fundis and federal party spokesperson for the Greens until December 1988, who was fundamentally committed to opposition work, rejected government participation. On the other hand, the realist Otto Schily, who switched to the Social Democrats in November 1989, recommended that the SPD "remain very firm" on the issue of touchstones. Schily, as well as the spectrum within the AL around the "Green Panthers on the Move" group, who were keen to form a coalition, tried to use the opportunity to reform the party in their interests. After Ströbele's speech at the federal assembly of the Greens in Duisburg in March 1990, in which he described a red-green coalition in Berlin as the "opportunity of the century", which was received with an ovation, the delegates supported the Berlin coalition course with a large majority.

The CDU vehemently opposed the red-green coalition in advance. Diepgen described the impending government alliance as a "coalition of madness". In the event that the irritating figure Christian Ströbele should become senator of justice, he announced a Referendum against the Senate. A pro-union "Initiative Zukunft Berlins nicht gefährden" ("Do not endanger Berlin's future") organized a demonstration on Kurfürstendamm against the planned "Coalition of Ruin", in which around 1,000 demonstrators took part. The Berlin Union received support from the federal party. Its General Secretary Heiner Geißler conjured up a gloomy scenario of a left-wing council system and unaffordable social benefits. Member of the Bundestag Eduard Lintner insinuated "servility towards the GDR" and claimed that Berlin "threatens to become ungovernable and should ultimately be at the mercy of violent demonstrations". Rudolf Seiters criticized that "the voters have been deceived, lied to and cheated" because Momper had always ruled out a coalition with the AL before the election. A CDU paper entitled "SPD: Betrayal of the Voters" polemically stated about Hilde Schramm: "As the daughter of Hitler's armaments minister Speer, she is coming to terms with the past in the AL." In a current hour in the Bundestag, the FDP chairman Otto Graf Lambsdorff saw the city on the "path to independent political unity in Berlin", i.e. following the ideas of the GDR.

The city's dominant Springer press (B.Z., Bild, Die Welt, Berliner Morgenpost) has always stood firmly on the side of the CDU. However, the Morgenpost also spoke of low blows from the CDU in view of the harsh, sometimes irrational criticism of a possible red-green senate that had already been voiced during the coalition negotiations. Even before the negotiations began, conservative national media such as the Frankfurter Allgemeine Zeitung predicted Berlin's economic decline if a red-green government was formed. The liberal-critical, low-circulation Tagesspiegel was more sympathetic to the Momper Senate. During the coalition negotiations, the small taz built up a euphoric mood of optimism in the left-alternative milieu about the possibility of a red-green coalition.

Franz Schoser, managing director of the German Industry and Trade Conference, advised a halt to investment, as Berlin might be on the way to a completely different economic system. The Berlin Chamber of Industry and Commerce spoke of a "whole bundle of dirigist of dirigismeasures" in the coalition agreement, without being able to name them more precisely. On the other hand, its president described Heiner Geißler's claim that a red-green Senate would ruin the economy as "propaganda".

== The work of the Red-Green Senate until November 1990 ==
=== The first months of the coalition ===
Until the summer of 1989, cooperation between the SPD and the AL was characterized by a common desire to resolve conflicts. Contrary to the opposition's expectations that there would be no majority for the Red-Greens and that voters would feel cheated, polls in May 1989 showed that both the SPD and the AL would make further gains in a new election, while the CDU and Republicans would lose ground compared to the January election.

The first test case that led to a conflict between the SPD and the AL was the dispute over the continuation of the expansion of the Großklinikum Rudolf-Virchow while at the same time abandoning the Charlottenburg University Hospital, a project of the previous CDU/FDP Senate that the AL wanted to reverse. Another point of contention was the construction of an electricity line, also initiated by the Diepgen Senate, which was to connect Berlin to the West German electricity grid. As the general assembly of the AL gave the senators an imperative mandate to reject the project and not to discuss any compromises, the coalition was in danger of breaking up for the first time. The grassroots also strictly rejected the establishment of a new border crossing at Schichaustraße for ecological reasons. In all three cases, the senators and the parliamentary group overrode the vote of the grassroots in order to continue the coalition, without this being sanctioned by the party. As a result, future orders from the general assembly took on the character of verbally radical empty formulas that could no longer have a threatening effect on the SPD. In contrast, after initial reservations, the Social Democrats agreed to a bill introduced by the AL to introduce a municipal foreigners' voting rights.

As early as March 1989, the Alternative List, in its new role as a governing party, came into conflict for the first time with the left-wing alternative milieu, more precisely with the autonomous scene, when several houses in Kreuzberg were occupied and evicted with the consent of the AL senators. The AL acted similarly when violent street battles broke out on 1 May 1989 in Kreuzberg despite the de-escalation strategy of the police.

The Senate provoked fierce protests with ecologically justified, extremely unpopular measures. A speed limit was introduced on an approximately six-kilometer section of the AVUS, which until then had been the only stretch of freeway without a speed limit in Berlin. Berliners saw this as a deep intrusion into their way of life, as they had previously perceived it as a symbol of freedom to be able to accelerate after the transit route through the GDR behind the Dreilinden border crossing. The ADAC mobilized evening counter-demonstrations over a longer period of time. The closure of the Havelchaussee in Grunewald to private vehicle traffic, the introduction of 30 km/h zones in residential areas and the widespread establishment of bus lanes were also accompanied by protests. The bus lanes on Kurfürstendamm in particular were fiercely opposed by the CDU, among others. In contrast, the introduction of an environmental card for the Berliner Verkehrsbetriebe did not trigger any protests.

A phase of mutual distrust between the SPD and the AL began in the late summer of 1989. A turning point in the coalition mood was marked by the unsuccessful ten-week strike by daycare center teachers, who had demanded a collective agreement and improved working conditions. In the longest strike in Berlin's post-war history, the AL sided with the nursery school teachers, while the SPD refused to negotiate with the strikers. In view of the growing tensions in the Senate, the weekly meetings of the parliamentary groups took on an increasingly important role. While the Coalition Committee soon failed, from the fall of 1989 onwards, this meeting became the real foundation of cooperation.

=== Relations with the GDR before November 9, 1989 ===
It was characteristic of the Alternative List's relationship to the GDR and the German division that on May 25, 1989, the Vice President of the House of Representatives, Hilde Schramm, refused to speak the ritual words of exhortation with which the House of Representatives had been opened since 1955: "I declare our unbending will that Germany and its capital Berlin must be united in peace and freedom." Even in wide circles of the SPD, talk of reunification had long been considered a lie. While some leading Greens in the federal party, such as Petra Kelly, Gert Bastian, Lukas Beckmann, Wilhelm Knabe or Milan Horáček, at times also Antje Vollmer, maintained particularly close contact and the Greens as a whole had the most intensive relations with the oppositional circles in the GDR of all West German parties, the influential Kreuzberg district association of the AL in particular was extremely SED-friendly. This went so far that the Kreuzberg Dirk Schneider, a member of the Bundestag from 1983 to 1985, was considered a "permanent representative of the SED in the Green parliamentary group" among Green members of the Bundestag. After reunification, Schneider, who worked specifically against the opposition in the GDR, and the former Kreuzberg district mayoral candidate Klaus Croissant, among others, were exposed as employees of the Ministry for State Security. Irrespective of their position on the opposition and their assessment of human rights in the GDR, the acceptance of German two-statehood was hardly controversial among the Greens and the AL.

On June 19, 1989, Walter Momper met with Erich Honecker in East Berlin. This meeting, which required lengthy negotiations on diplomatic and protocol issues, was to be the acid test of the SPD-Green coalition's policy on Germany and Berlin. The Berlin SPD, which had already been in constant contact with the SED, made radical proposals at this meeting. For example, it offered to integrate West Berlin more closely into the GDR economy and at the same time abolish special federal subsidies. In addition, chief negotiator Harry Ristock went so far as to recognize the Berlin Wall as an "opportunity" for West Berlin to "live in peace". As he emphasized his ties to the Federal Republic despite all the concessions, the SED reacted cautiously. Honecker rejected the proposal of a joint bid by East and West Berlin for the Olympic Games, referring to a Leipzig bid. Momper did, however, manage to make it easier for West Berliners to travel to East Berlin and the surrounding area. In view of the rapid developments over the next few months, the significance of this meeting dwindled to an inconsequential side note in history.

Even before the fall of the Wall, clear changes were noticeable in Berlin. In Poland, Solidarność had changed the situation and created new freedoms. Since Berlin was not only nearby, but visitors from Eastern Europe could stay in the city for 30 days without a visa according to an order from the Allied Commandant's Office, Poles flocked to West Berlin in droves. The most obvious changes were the "Polish Market" not far from Potsdamer Platz and the many import-export stores on Kantstraße near Bahnhof Zoo station. In addition, there was the constantly growing number of expatriates from the GDR, for whom West Berlin often seemed more familiar than West Germany and who therefore moved here in large numbers. 37,000 newcomers within a year and 500 in one day began to push the city to the limits of its capacity. The AL wanted to treat the migrants from the GDR like asylum seekers from other countries, but this was out of the question for Momper.

Despite all the changes, the Senate stuck to its political line of always conducting negotiations with the SED and barely acknowledging the opposition in the GDR. This rigid stance was based on the fear that West Berlin would have serious problems if there were unrest in the GDR and possible intervention by the Soviet Union. This policy, which was solely related to the official state organs, led, for example, to AL Senator for the Environment Schreyer signing a contract for the disposal of West Berlin hazardous waste at a landfill site in Vorketzin in Brandenburg, although this made a mockery of all environmental guidelines and environmental groups in the GDR protested vehemently. Momper himself regarded the founding of the Social Democratic Party in the GDR (SDP) on October 7, 1989, as an ineffective disruptive element.

On October 29, Günter Schabowski, spokesman for the Central Committee of the SED, briefed Walter Momper on plans for generous travel regulations. As Momper was aware that this would mean hundreds of thousands of visitors, he set up a project group "Preparing for increased visitor and travel traffic from East Berlin and the GDR". At midday on the day the Wall opened, Momper learned that the Central Committee of the SED would decide on new travel regulations that day and put the Berliner Verkehrsbetriebe on alert. As surprising as the timing and manner of the opening of the Wall on November 9, 1989, was, it did not catch the Senate completely unprepared.

== The fall of the Wall as a turning point ==
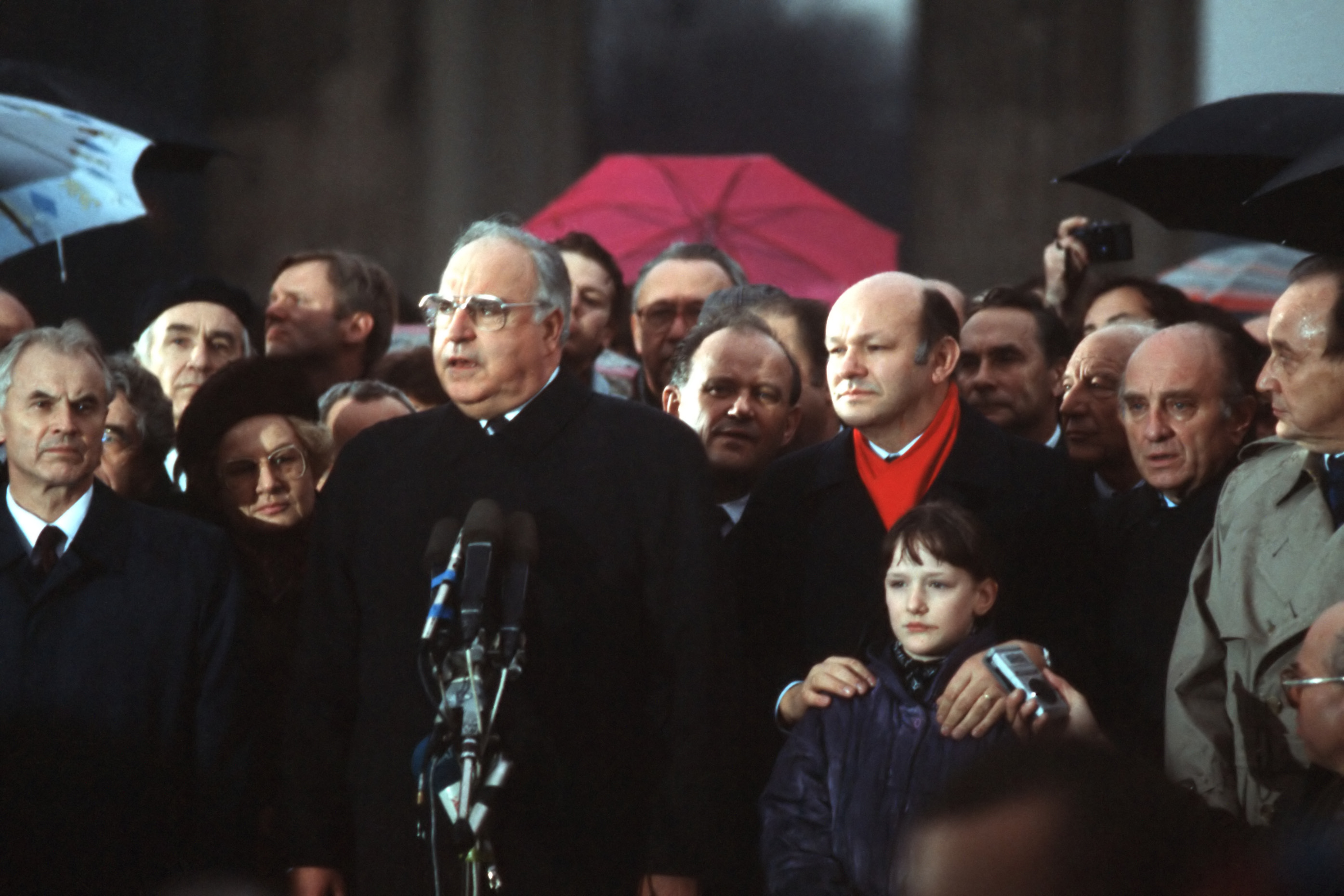
The Chairman of the GDR Council of Ministers Hans Modrow, Federal Chancellor Helmut Kohl and Walter Momper during the opening of the Brandenburg Gate on December 22, 1989

=== The fall of the Berlin Wall ===
With the Wall Opening on November 9, 1989, local and world politics coincided for the last time, as they did under Ernst Reuter during the Berlin Blockade or under Willy Brandt when the Wall was built, and the Governing Mayor was also a foreign politician before Berlin became a normal federal state. On the day after the Wall came down, Parliament was unable to agree on a joint resolution because the AL strictly insisted on German two-statehood and the term "reunification" should not appear in the text under any circumstances, as this was a "reactionary project". When Momper, Diepgen and the President of Parliament Jürgen Wohlrabe stepped onto the balcony of the Schöneberg Town Hall together with the guests of honor from Bonn Helmut Kohl, Hans-Dietrich Genscher and Willy Brandt, the Chancellor's speech and the dissonant singing of the Deutschlandlied were drowned out by the whistling of the assembled crowd.

The opening of the Berlin Wall made Walter Momper known throughout Germany and even the world as the "man with the red scarf", who was constantly on television, and considerably increased his popularity. He was being touted as a possible future SPD chairman and chancellor candidate. While Momper confirmed the two-state system immediately after the fall of the Wall, he quickly switched to a reunification course in view of the experiences on the ground and the unfolding events. This put him at odds with the federal party, as the candidate for chancellor Oskar Lafontaine rejected the rapid unification of the two German states. As Lafontaine increasingly maneuvered the SPD onto the sidelines with this stance, in May 1990 the media even discussed changing the lead candidate from Lafontaine to Momper during the current election campaign.

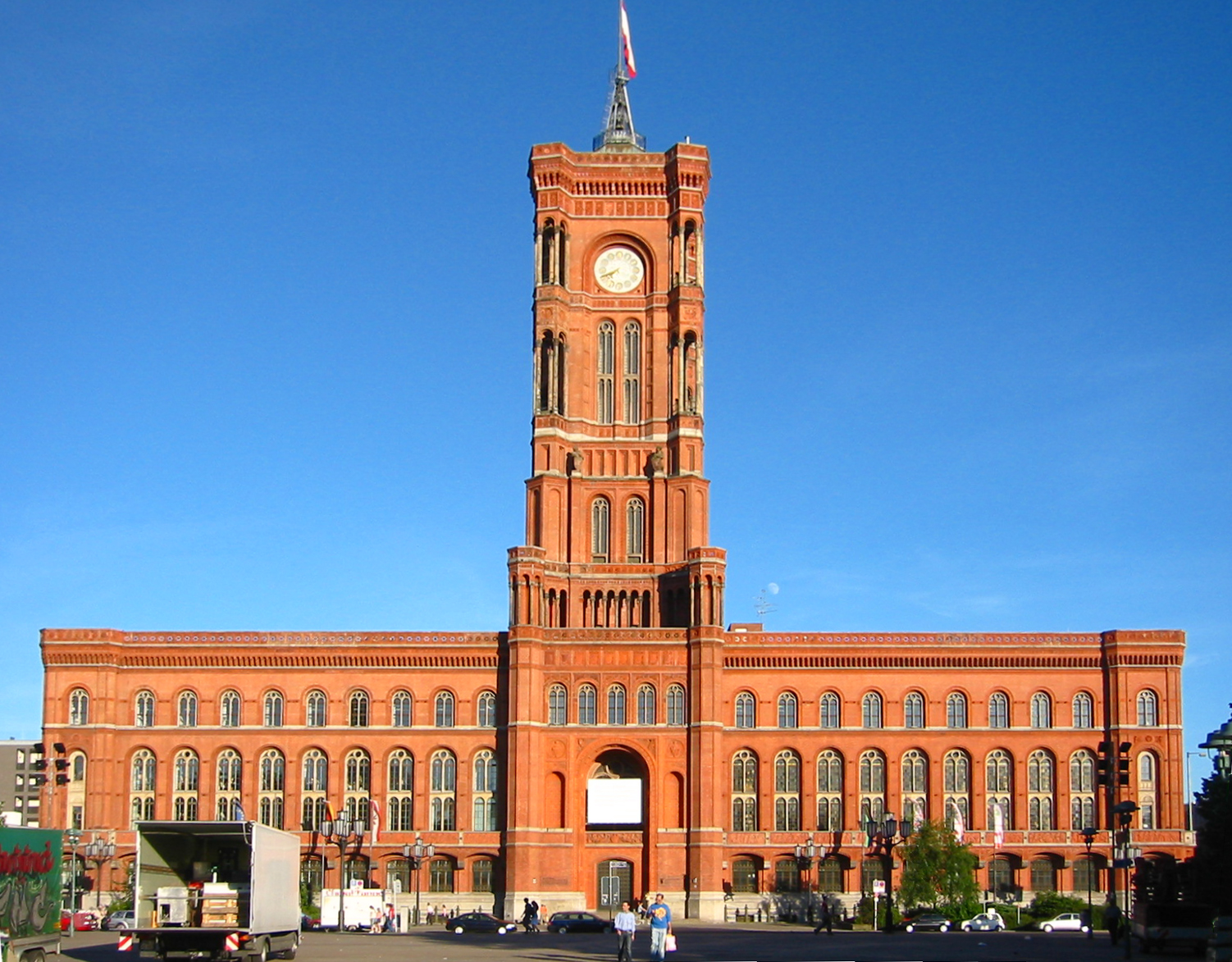
The Red City Hall, seat of the East Berlin magistrate

=== Joint work with the East Berlin magistrate ===
The changed situation quickly confronted Berlin with completely new problems, such as the greatly increased volume of traffic. On the weekend after the Wall came down alone, around two million people flocked to West Berlin, S- and U-Bahn overflowed, stations had to be closed. The establishment of numerous new border crossings put additional strain on the traffic routes. To deal with these problems, a joint regional committee was set up to coordinate West and East Berlin. However, German reunification and thus the unification of Berlin still seemed a long way off. So Diepgen set his sights on 1995. However, the development accelerated noticeably, primarily due to the urge for a rapid Currency Union and the unchecked flow of migrants to the West.

The first free municipal election of May 6, 1990 brought the SPD in East Berlin 34.0% of the vote, while the CDU received only 17.7%. Due to the strong result of the SED successor party PDS, which was considered incapable of forming a coalition (30.0%) (30.0%) led to a grand coalition, the Magistrat Schwierzina. As in the first free Volkskammerwahl on March 18, 1990, with the surprisingly clear victory of the CDU and later in the Bundestagswahl on December 2, 1990, the citizens' movement no longer played a major role, the Bündnis 90 received 9.9% of the vote, the Grüne Liste 2.7%. The model of a Third Path between capitalism and socialism in a continued GDR favored by the citizens' movement clearly did not appeal to voters.

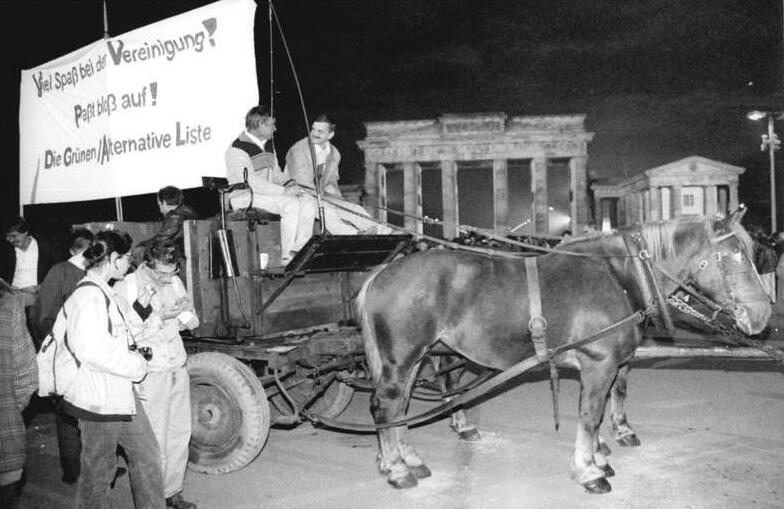
AL demonstration on reunification in front of the Brandenburg Gate:Viel Spaß bei der Vereinigung! Paßt bloß auf!

On June 12, 1990, under the leadership of Walter Momper and Tino Schwierzina, the first joint meeting of the Senate and Magistrate ("Magi-Senate") took place in the Red Town Hall. After that, the meetings alternated between the Rotes Rathaus and the Rathaus Schöneberg in West Berlin, most recently only taking place there due to the better technical conditions. The two presiding mayors and the 13 senators and city councillors each had equal rights. Senate and magistrate bills were submitted jointly by the responsible senator and the city councillor before a resolution was passed. The subordinate administration had to be standardized and the different developments since 1948 had to be adapted to each other. A magistrate's office was set up in the magistrate's office, based on the existing Senate Chancellery. Coordinated structures were also to promote the final unification of the city administration. In accordance with the Unification Treaty between the GDR and the Federal Republic of Germany, the Senate and Magistrat under Tino Schwierzina (SPD) officially governed as a dual government from the day of reunification on October 3, 1990, until the election of a joint city government. In view of the rapid developments following the fall of the Wall and the unification of Berlin into one city, a new election for the House of Representatives was scheduled for December 2, 1990, the day of the Bundestag election.

It became problematic for the Senate when, in early 1990, both Finance Minister Theo Waigel and Ingrid Matthäus-Maier, the SPD's financial policy spokeswoman in the Bundestag, questioned the Berlin subsidy, which accounted for half of West Berlin's budget, including the Berlin allowance, as its basis had also disappeared with the Wall. Although, according to Walter Momper, Helmut Kohl promised not to touch the Berlin subsidy, the Federal Cabinet decided at the beginning of 1991 to gradually reduce it by 1994.

== The end of the coalition ==
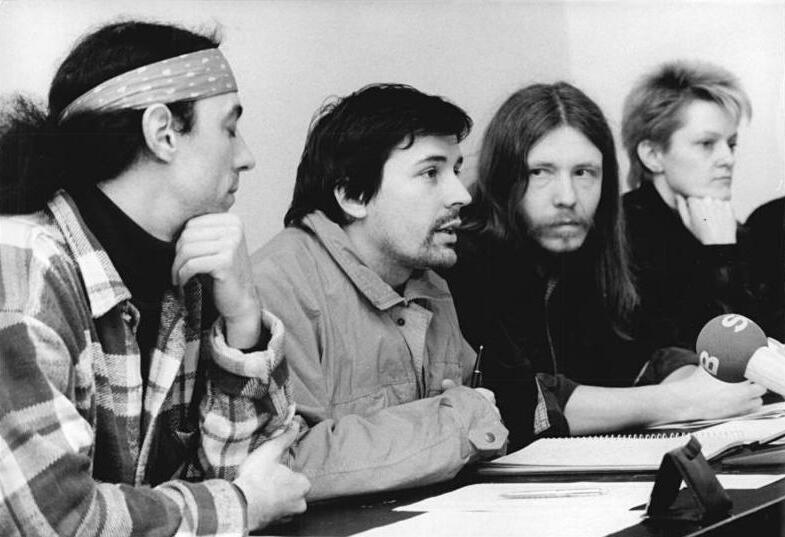
Renate Künast (far right, January 17, 1990)

=== Escalation of the coalition crisis ===
The new problems arising from the fall of the Wall significantly intensified the crisis of the red-green alliance. Berlin had lost its role as an "urban biotope" overnight and had moved from the outermost periphery to the center of German politics and the most diverse interests. The foundations of the reform-oriented "conflict alliance" between the SPD and AL had changed radically, the previous policy could not be continued without interruption, so that the number of critics of the coalition within and outside the parties grew steadily. Walter Momper himself, as he later confessed, was secretly convinced that the coalition with the AL was too unstable for the tasks ahead, but saw no alternative in a grand coalition. Encreasingly, decisions were made by a small circle of people around Walter Momper. The Senate Chancellery was mainly responsible for German and unification policy and virtually excluded the AL, which, however, also showed little interest in this policy area. This leadership style was also criticized within the SPD.

When the Alternative List spoke out against the sale of a large area at Potsdamer Platz to Daimler-Benz, it was one of the rare cases in which it received broad support in the press, among urban planners and in parts of the SPD. Walter Momper and Building Senator Wolfgang Nagel had continued the negotiations that had already begun before the fall of the Wall without addressing the changed situation in the meantime, had agreed a low sales price and had not adequately informed either their parliamentary group or their coalition partner. Urban development senator Schreyer therefore refused the necessary countersignature and pushed through an urban planning competition to design the area. When it came to signing the purchase agreement in the House of Representatives, the SPD passed it with the votes of the CDU and against the AL, although the coalition agreement expressly prohibited the parliamentary groups from voting with changing majorities. Also in the summer of 1990, Michaele Schreyer fought against the building permit for an atomic experimental reactor of the Hahn-Meitner Institute. A decision on this controversial issue, which became another test for the coalition, was never reached.

The AL achieved successes by introducing association action rights in nature conservation, environmental impact assessment for public projects, an energy saving act, integration classes for disabled and non-disabled children, the establishment of a control center for same-sex lifestyles and a state Anti-Discrimination Act. However, all of the review mandates in the coalition agreement were decided against the AL's ideas. In March 1990, the AL parliamentary group leader, Heidi Bischoff-Pflanz, resigned in disappointment at the increasing failures within the governing alliance. Renate Künast was elected as her successor, whose close cooperation with the SPD parliamentary group leader Ditmar Staffelt kept the coalition alive. In June 1990, the break-up of the coalition was on the agenda of the AL's general meeting, but a two-thirds majority decided in favor of an unconditional continuation. A wave of party resignations and internal distancing from the coalition reached its peak in the fall of 1990, when Harald Wolf, Birgit Arkenstette and Astrid Geese, among others, left the party in September and other activists around Heidi Bischoff-Pflanz in November.

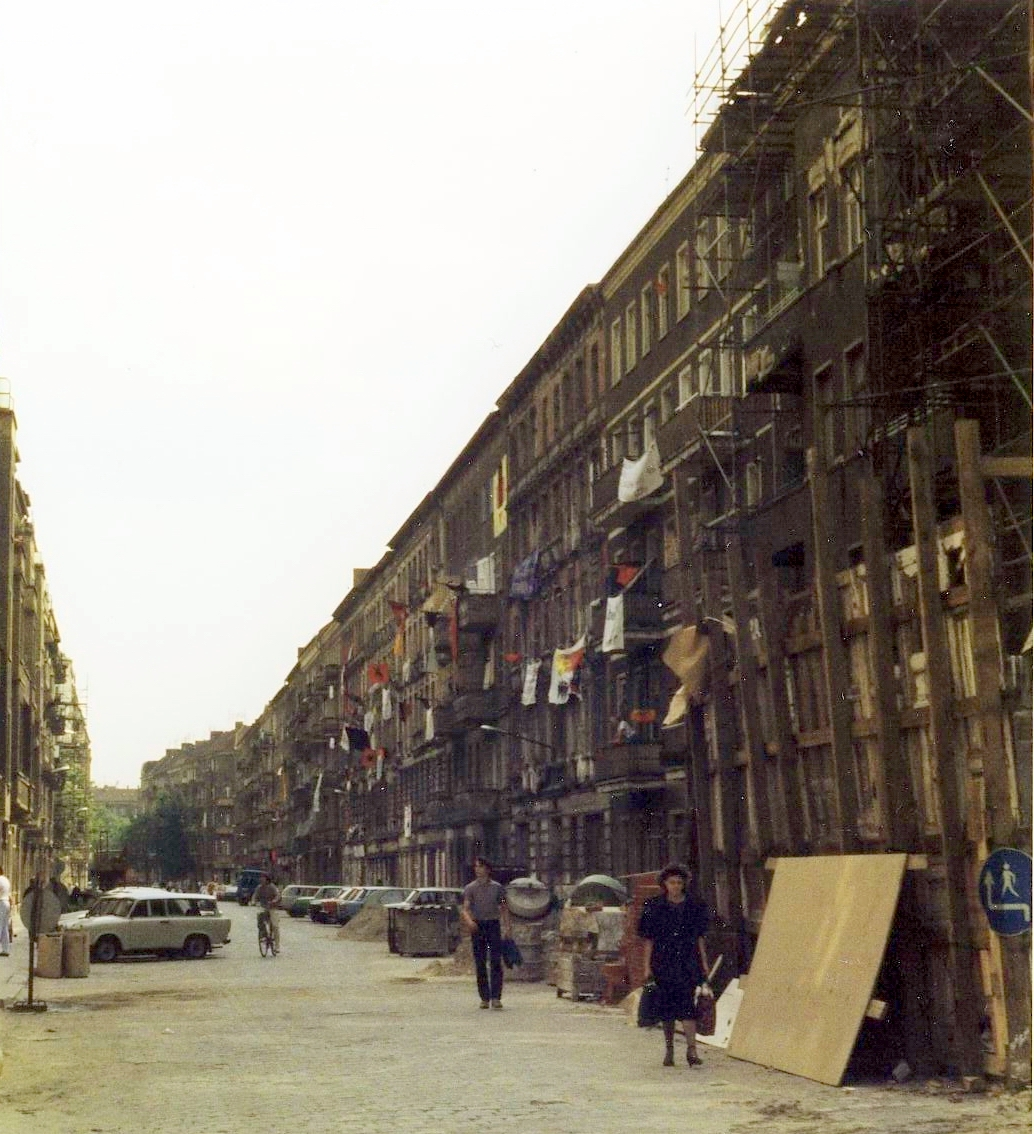
Squatted houses in Mainzer Strasse 1990

=== Exit of the AL from the coalition ===
On November 14, 1990, Interior Senator Erich Pätzold (SPD) had 13 houses in Mainzer Straße in Friedrichshain occupied since April 1990 evacuated in one of the most massive police operations in Berlin in the post-war period. This led to fierce street battles. Pätzold had neither informed the AL about the eviction in advance nor allowed them to intervene during the action.

On November 15, a good two weeks before the already scheduled new election, the AL therefore terminated the coalition. The three female senators resigned on November 19, even though they did not agree with the AL parliamentary group and executive committee. Heide Pfarr took over the Senate Office for Education, Vocational Training and Sport from Sybille Volkholz, Norbert Meisner took over the Senate Office for Urban Development and Environmental Protection from Michaele Schreyer and Ingrid Stahmer took over the Senate Office for Women, Youth and Family from Anne Klein. A motion of no confidence against Momper planned by the parliamentary group and the executive committee of the AL was not tabled due to pressure from the party base.

The break-up of the coalition came suddenly and, for many observers, abruptly, but only marked the end of the increasingly conflict-ridden government cooperation. In retrospect, Harald Wolf described it as a problem for the AL that there was not a single, particularly serious point of contention between the governing parties, such as the nuclear policy in Hesse, but rather numerous smaller disputes, meaning that the exit from the government was less convincing to the public. The decision to break the coalition was made easier by the knowledge that new elections would be held two weeks later anyway. The House of Representatives had already ceased its work for this legislative period. There were clearly also tactical reasons for ending the cooperation: The Alternative List recommended itself to its dissatisfied core voters with the break, and for the same reason, in this case consideration for middle-class voter circles, it suited the SPD.

=== Election to the House of Representatives on December 2, 1990 ===
	Second votes	West Berlin	East Berlin	Mandate
CDU	40,4	49,0	25,0	101
SPD	30,4	29,5	32,1	76
PDS	9,2	1,1	23,6	23
FDP	7,1	7,9	5,6	18
AL	5,0	6,9	1,7	12
B'90	4,4	1,3	9,8	11
REP	3,1	3,7	1,9	–

With the Election to the House of Representatives on December 2, 1990, democratic elections were held throughout Berlin for the first time since 1946. As a special feature, it was held on the same day as the 1990 federal election, in which the West Berlin population was also able to participate for the first time. In accordance with the Four-Power Agreement, until then only the House of Representatives had been able to delegate non-voting so-called Berlin Member of Parliament to the Bundestag. Interest in the election to the House of Representatives was higher in Berlin than in the Bundestag election because the latter was considered decided, while a close result was expected in the House of Representatives election. Despite leaving the coalition, the AL had not ruled out working with the SPD again after the election.

Like the 1989 result, the clear outcome of the 1990 election was also a big surprise. Both the SPD and the AL suffered significant defeats. In the western part of Berlin, i.e. compared to 1989, the two parties lost 7.8 and 4.9% respectively, with the CDU achieving 49% compared to 29.5% for the SPD. Across Berlin, the SPD received 30.4%, while the CDU received 40.4%, although it remained well behind the SPD in the east. The Alternative List and a list association Bündnis 90/Grüne/UFV, an electoral alliance of East Greens, Bündnis 90 and the Independent Women's Association, ran separately in the election and received a total of 9.2% of the vote. After the election, they formed a joint parliamentary group, followed by a merger in 1993. With the PDS, which received 9.2% of the vote, the AL and SPD faced competition from the left-wing camp. However, the SED successor party did not yet play a major role in West Berlin in this election, receiving only 1.1% compared to 23.6% in the eastern part of the city. Some former left-wing AL members such as Dirk Schneider, Harald Wolf and Klaus Croissant ran for the PDS. Schneider and Wolf entered the House of Representatives via the state list. The FDP returned to the House of Representatives with 7.1%. As expected, the Republicans failed to reach the five percent hurdle with 3.1%.

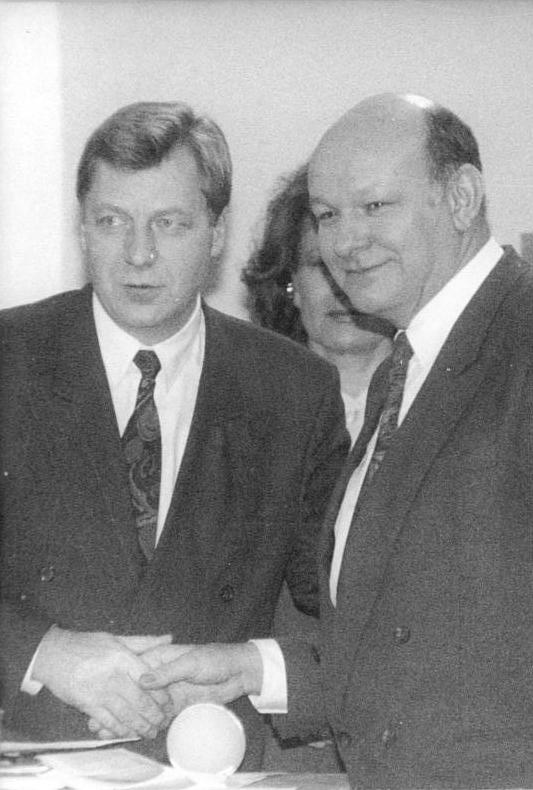
Walter Momper congratulates Eberhard Diepgen after his election to the House of Representatives on December 2, 1990.

=== Grand coalition and further developments ===
As Black-Yellow failed to achieve a majority, a grand coalition was formed under Eberhard Diepgen (Senate Diepgen III). Before Diepgen, only two prime ministers, Max Brauer in Hamburg and Hinrich Wilhelm Kopf in Lower Saxony, had managed to return to the office of head of government after being voted out of office in the 1950s. Momper, who bitterly declared the Red-Greens to be an "obsolete model", was not a member of the new Senate, but initially remained party leader.

With the Momper Senate, the second red-green coalition after the one in Hesse also collapsed prematurely. However, an alliance of SPD and Greens had existed in Lower Saxony since June 21, 1990 (Cabinet Schröder I) and a traffic light coalition with the participation of Alliance 90 (Cabinet Stolpe I) in Brandenburg since November 1, 1990. As around 850 new, generally realpolitik-oriented members joined the AL in 1989–90, while just under 700 mostly left-wing party members left, the party's profile as a distinctly left-wing state association was relativized. This development, which was reinforced in the next legislative period by the merger with the East Berlin Alliance 90, and the experience in government and administration promoted a structural reform that pushed back the grassroots democratic elements of the AL after 1990. It was not until eleven years after the first red-green experiment that the SPD and the now "Alliance 90/The Greens" formed another short-term government in Berlin. After the break-up of the grand coalition under Eberhard Diepgen, Klaus Wowereit formed a red-green minority government (Senate Wowereit I), which was tolerated by the PDS. This red-green senate only lasted until January 17, 2002, and was replaced by a red-red-red senate under Wowereit after the elections to the House of Representatives on October 21, 2001. Senate under Wowereit (Senate Wowereit II).

== Literature ==
- Berliner Koalitionsvereinbarung zwischen SPD und AL vom 13. März 1989, published by the SPD Berlin, Berlin 1989
- Gudrun Heinrich: Rot-Grün in Berlin. Die Alternative Liste in der Regierungsverantwortung 1989–1990. Schüren, Marburg 1993, ISBN 3-89472-079-4
- Gudrun Heinrich: Rot-Grün in Berlin 1989–1990. In: Joachim Raschke: Die Grünen. Wie sie wurden, was sie sind. Bund, Köln 1993, p. 809–822, ISBN 3-7663-2474-8
- Eckhard Jesse: Die Wahl zum Abgeordnetenhaus von Berlin am 7. Dezember 1990. Die Korrektur der Korrektur von 1989. In: Zeitschrift für Parlamentsfragen 22 (1991), p. 390–405
- Walter Momper: Grenzfall. Berlin im Brennpunkt deutscher Geschichte. Bertelsmann, München 1991, ISBN 3-570-02284-6
- Wilfried Rott: Die Insel. Eine Geschichte West-Berlins 1948–1990. C. H. Beck, München 2009, ISBN 978-3-406-59133-4
- Horst W. Schmollinger: Die Wahl zum Abgeordnetenhaus von Berlin am 29. Januar 1989. Ein überraschender Wandel im Parteiensystem. In: Zeitschrift für Parlamentsfragen 20 (1989), S. 309–322
- Michaele Schreyer: Rot-Grün – Ein Auslaufmodell? Die Lehren aus Berlin. In: Ralf Fücks (Hrsg.): Sind die Grünen noch zu retten? Rowohlt, Reinbek 1991, ISBN 3-499-13017-3
