= Sybille Volkholz =

German politician

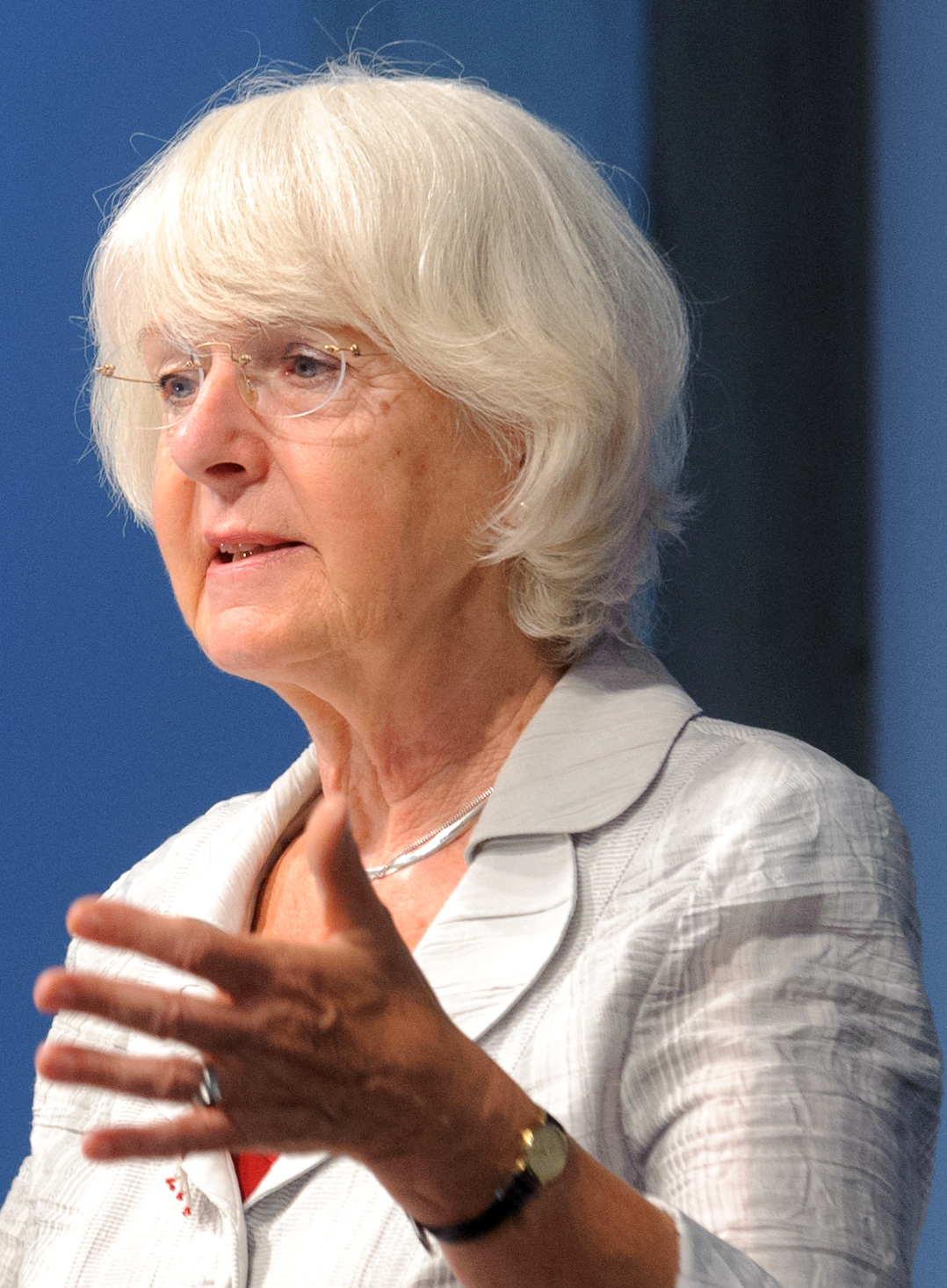
- Volkholz in 2012
- Born: 17 March 1944 (age 82); Dramburg, Pomerania, Germany
- Education: Bonn; Cologne; Münster
- Occupations: Educationalist; Trades Union Activist; Berlin senator Member of the Berlin parliament
- Political party: Alternative Liste für Demokratie und Umweltschutz (AL)

Sybille Volkholz (born 17 March 1944) is a German educationalist and a former Berlin senator.

== Life and works ==
Sybille Volkholz was born at Dramburg (as it was known before the frontier changes mandated in 1945), a small manufacturing and market town in Pomerania, positioned at the edge of the marshy flatlands east of Stettin. Her birth coincided with the start of an eighteen-month period of intensive ethnic cleansing. She grew up and, till 1963, attended school far to the west, in Essen. She went on to study Sociology at Bonn, Cologne and the WWU (university) at Münster, from where in 1967 she received her first degree. That was followed by a three-year stint between 1967 and 1970 as a research assistant at the (subsequently expanded and in 1971 rebranded) Max Planck Institute for Human Development in Berlin, while studying for a career in the teaching profession. Then came a period of study in schools-level teaching at the Pädagogische Hochschule Berlin (College of Education) in West Berlin. Between 1972 and 1979 she taught at a secondary school in Berlin-Charlottenburg. Between August 1979 and March 1989, she attended a Teachers’ Training college (subsequently redesignated as a “Fachschule für Sozialpädagogik”) in the city.

As a teaching student and during her Lehramtsreferendariat (period of in school training) Volkholz involved herself in the political aspects of the profession, principally through her involvement in the West Berlin branch of the ”Gewerkschaft Erziehung und Wissenschaft” (GEW), West Germany's principal Teachers’ Union. She served as deputy regional chair between 1979 and 1989.

The state election conducted in March 1989 was the last state election to be held in West Berlin before reunification took effect. The two leading parties received an identical number of seats in the Berlin parliament, which was widely reported as a defeat for the centre-right CDU (party) which up till this point had secured the largest number of votes and seats in every Berlin state election since 1975. Following difficult negotiations a new coalition administration was agreed under the leadership of Walter Momper of the centre-left SPD. The “junior partner” in the coalition was West Berlin's Alternative Liste für Demokratie und Umweltschutz (AL; English: Alternative List for Democracy and Protection of the Environment), a grouping with many of the features of a traditional party that had rapidly gained electoral support in West Berlin since its relatively recent creation in 1978. Under the terms of the coalition agreement, e of the 14 members of the Berlin Senate (governing council) were nominated by the AL. For the first time in history, there were more women than men in the senate. All three of the AL senators were women, including the senator for schools, professional education and sports. This portfolio went to Sybille Volkholz. Like her fellow senator Anne Klein She was formally described as a "non-party senator for the AL”. Volkholz would later recall Mayor Momper's decision to appoint more females than males to his senate as a “clever move”. He was certainly “no feminist” and there was a sense in which some of the senators “felt used”, but it enabled the mayor to avoid appointing a number of potentially troublesome male colleagues, and the move was viewed favourably by a number of influential commentators. In other respects, relations between the coalition partners remained uneasy. Volkholz found herself repeatedly blocked in her attempts to open up mainstream schools to disabled children: “I went through many battles for a wider acceptance of handicapped children”. (Note: “Ich habe viele Kämpfe durchgestanden für eine bessere Akzeptanz von behinderten Kindern”.)

One of the unforeseen consequences of the changes of 1989–90 and the reunification of Berlin was that the redevelopment of an area of what had been East Berlin, which had been cleared for rebuilding, was postponed. The area in question quickly became home to a very large number of squatters. In order to move matters on, in November 1990 the Berlin senate ordered one of Berlin's largest police operations of the postwar era in order to remove the squatters and seal the area off to prevent their return. The so-called Clearing of the Mainzer Street involved ten water canon trucks, helicopters, tear gas, guns and around 3,000 policemen. This belt and braces approach was widely seen as heavy handed. There was serious street fighting there were complaints. It turned out that Erich Pätzold, the SPD senator whose portfolio covered the issue of squatter clearance, had neither alerted his three Green Party ministerial colleagues to his plans nor involved them in discussions about it once the exercise was under way. The already uneasy coalition between SPD senators and their Green-facing colleagues broke apart. The three Green senators were persuaded not to pursue their motion of no-confidence, but Sybille Volkholz, along with her like-minded colleagues Michaele Schreyer and Anne Klein, did resign. The Momper Senate lost their majority: the political crisis resulting was less acute than might be thought, since new elections had already been scheduled to take place the next month. Following the 1990 Berlin state election Volkholz continued to serve as the AL spokeswoman on education, retaining the role following the 1993 party merger as a result of which the AL was subsumed into Germany's newly expanded “Green Party”. It was as a candidate from the party list that in 1990 she was elected to membership of the Berlin state parliament (‘’” Abgeordnetenhaus”’’), in which she retained her seat till 1999.

During the early decades of the twenty-first century Volkholz has continued to advocate improvements in the way that Germany organises its schooling. One theme to which she returns derives from the way in which the state has become ever more intrusive in society, notably in the field of education. The belief that the state is willing and able to solve all society's problems is not merely misguided, but discourages individuals from taking any responsibility for schools. She is an advocate for increased “inclusivity”, and for greater involvement of non-teaching professionals in the functioning of schools, often as volunteers, basing her ideas on an understanding of school organisation in North America. Local business leaders and of course parents could and should be encouraged to become far more hands-on in their involvement with individual schools. To some extent trends in what was West Berlin before 1990 have indeed moved in this direction, not on the basis of some great eureka moment on the part of government, but because ideas championed by Volkholz have become increasingly mainstream. Between 2000 and 2004 Volkholz headed up the Education Commission of the Heinrich Böll Foundation and also led the “Schools-Businesses partnership” of the Berlin Chamber of Commerce. From 2005 till 2015 she teamed up with the Verein Berliner Kaufleute und Industrieller (‘’Association of Berlin Businesspeople and Industrialists’’) to organise a “Citizens’ Education Network” (subsequently renamed “Berlin Reading Sponsorship”) which organises Lesepate, volunteers to help promote and teach reading at primary and secondary schools to children in need of extra encouragement and engagement to master these vital skills. Since 2013 she has played a leading role with the “Training and Education Advisory Board” of the Stiftung Brandenburger Tor (Brandenburg Gate Foundation).
