= Peter Kurth (politician) =

German politician (born 1960)

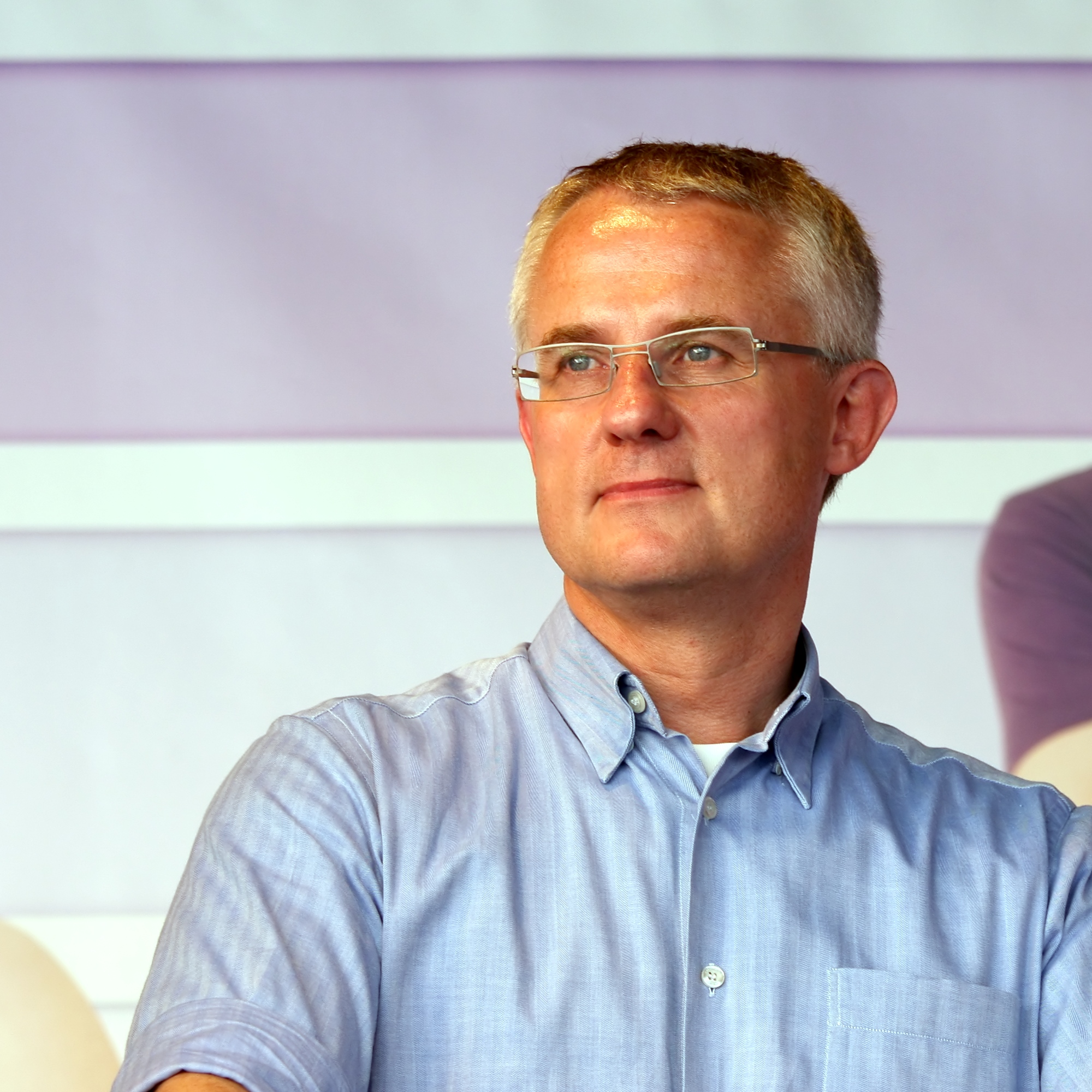

Member of the Senate, State Minister of Finance
- In office 1999–2001
- Preceded by: Annette Fugmann-Heesing
- Succeeded by: Christiane Krajewski

Personal details
- Born: 5 April 1960 (age 66)
- Party: CDU

Peter Kurth (born 5 April 1960) is a German politician (former CDU) and lobby-manager who served as State Minister of Finance (Senator) in Berlin from 1999 until 2001. He is active in far-right networks and is supporting neo-fascist activities in Germany and Austria.

== Career ==
Peter Kurth studied law and political science both in Bonn and in Freiburg. Following a traineeship in Berlin, he carried out various activities insocial and business administration in the State of Berlin.

From 1994, Kurth served as State Secretary to the successive State Ministers of Finance Elmar Pieroth (1994–1996) and Annette Fugmann-Heesing (1996–1999) in the government of Mayor Eberhard Diepgen (CDU). In 2009 he ran for the CDU in Cologne for the office of mayor. From 2001 until 2009, Kurth was a member of the board of Alba Group in Berlin.

Kurth was president of the influential "Federal Association of the German Waste Management, Water and Raw Materials Industry" (BDE). He was scheduled to step down from the office of association president at the end of January 2024. However, two weeks ago the association announced that it had separated from Kurth with immediate effect. Right-wing extremism, racism or anti-Semitism have no place in the BDE, the statement said.

In October 2023, Kurth resigned from the CDU. He retained his membership in the “Mittelstandsunion”.

== Far-right activities ==
In 2023, Kurth invited prominent representatives of the AfD and the radical right to his private apartment in Berlin, including Maximilian Krah, AfD's top candidate for the 2024 European elections, the right-wing extremist publisher Götz Kubitschek and the Austrian IB right-wing extremist Martin Sellner.

In 2019, Kurth supported the neo-fascist Identitarian Movement (IB) with at least €120,000 for a right-wing extremist house project. The money was transferred to a company associated with the IB and was apparently used to purchase a house near Linz in Austria, which was opened in 2021 as a right-wing meeting place under the name "Castell Aurora". Also with Peter Kurth's financial support, a property for an IB house in Chemnitz was purchased in 2022. The IB activist responsible for the purchase was also present at the meeting in Kurth's Berlin apartment in July 2023.

== Other activities ==
=== Corporate boards ===
- Deutsche Bank, Member of the Advisory Board
- KfW, Member of the Board of Supervisory Directors (1999–2001)

=== Non-profit organizations ===
- Federation of German Industries (BDI), Member of the Presidium (2017–2019)
- European Federation of Waste Management and Environmental Services (FEAD), vice-president (since 2009)
- German RETech Partnership, Member of the Advisory Board
