= Senator Kay =

Senator Kay may refer to:

- Ella Kay (1895–1988), Senate of Berlin
- Robert E. Kay (1916–1990), New Jersey State Senate
- Thomas B. Kay (1864–1931), Oregon State Senate
