= Anne Klein (politician) =

German lawyer and politician (1950–2011)

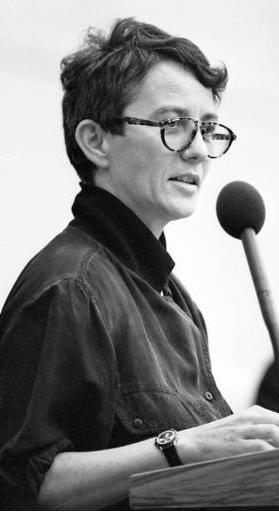
Klein in 1990

Anne Klein (2 March 1950 – 23 April 2011) was a German lawyer and, at the time of German reunification, a senator in the Momper Senate in Berlin for Alternative Liste für Demokratie und Umweltschutz. Her focus as a senator was on women's rights. She was also the first Berlin senator to "go public" about being a lesbian.

== Life ==
Anne Klein was born in Bilsdorf, a small village in the hills above Saarlouis, in what at that time was still part of the Saar Protectorate, controlled under conditions of growing ambiguity by the French government. There have been suggestions that her subsequent approach to gender politics may have been influenced by the 1947 Saarland Constitution, a document based on French law which incorporated elements of gender equality before the law and the concept of equal pay for equal work. To the north and east of the region lay West Germany, which under Chancellor Adenauer would have been seen as a relatively conservative society in respect of such matters. After 1955 the Saarland was integrated into the German Federal Republic (West Germany). Klein passed her Abitur (school final exams) at the Realgymnasium (secondary school) in nearby Dillingen. She studied Jurisprudence and Psychology at Saarbrücken and, from 1972, as a referendary in Berlin.

She became involved in West Berlin's rapidly evolving feminist movement and with fellow activists set up the city's first women's shelter and its first feminist legal advice centre in Berlin's Kreuzberg quarter. In 1978 she passed her state law exams and, in the teeth of opposition from the German Law Society (Rechtsanwaltskammer) set up in Berlin the first law practice in the country specialising in women's law. Until shortly before she died she continued to work in Berlin as a lawyer and notary specialising in family law.

== Politics and professional life ==
Between 1983 and 1984 Anne Klein worked as a research assistant for the Green Party group in the Bundestag (West German parliament). It was the first time the party's candidates had been elected to the assembly. She worked particularly closely with Waltraud Schoppe und Petra Kelly. The policy area on which she focused covered "women, antidiscrimintation and social affairs". With other women she worked on the party's first draft for the Allgemeines Gleichbehandlungsgesetz, an anti-discrimination law, which some years later - albeit with further changes - was introduced in the Bundestag. Anne Klein's principal objectives with this work were to anchor feminist policies within the Green Party's strategy and to build up the role of women in framing party policy.

The results of the 1989 West Berlin state election on 29 January 1989 were inconclusive. Following lengthy coalition negotiations Walter Momper of the SPD emerged as Governing Mayor of what at that stage was still West Berlin. Anne Klein accepted an invitation to join his ministerial team in the Senate of Berlin. Although she was not actually a senator, she was co-opted as a "non-party candidate for the Alternative Liste für Demokratie und Umweltschutz. Her portfolio covered "Women, young people and the family" ("Frauen, Jugend und Familie"). Anne Klein, who was already known for her feminist views and whose own same-sex partnership was no secret, attracted mixed headlines when she set up in her department an office for same-sex lifestyles. She was able to provide a hitherto unprecedented degree of financial security for the Wildwasser project which supports women who have suffered sexual abuse as children. On her initiative sanctuaries were created for women and girls who found themselves in crisis and fell into prostitution. She also took steps to ensure that women seeking refuge in the city's women's shelters should not be required to pay for their accommodation there.

One of the unforeseen consequences of the changes of 1989–90 and the reunification of Berlin was that the redevelopment of an area of what had been East Berlin, which had been cleared for rebuilding, was postponed. The area in question quickly became home to a very large number of squatters. In order to move matters on, in November 1990 the Berlin senate ordered one of Berlin's largest police operations of the postwar era in order to remove the squatters and seal the area off to prevent their return. The so-called Clearing of the Mainzer Street involved ten water cannon trucks, helicopters, tear gas, guns and around 3,000 policemen. This belt and braces approach was widely seen as heavy handed. There was serious street fighting: there were complaints. It turned out that Erich Pätzold, the SPD senator whose portfolio covered the issue of squatter clearance, had neither alerted his three Green Party ministerial colleagues to his plans nor involved them in discussions about it once the exercise was under way. The already uneasy coalition between SPD senators and their Green-facing colleagues broke apart. The three Green senators were persuaded not to pursue their motion of no-confidence, but after 23 months in office Anne Klein, along with her like-minded colleagues Michaele Schreyer and Sybille Volkholz, did resign. The Momper administration lost their majority: the political crisis resulting was less acute than might be thought, since new elections had already been scheduled to take place the next month.

Anne Klein's public profile had already been raised in an unwelcome manner in the summer of 1989 when it became known that back in 1987 she had won approximately 8,000 marks in the "Pilotenspiel", a new gambling game, fashionable among yuppies, that was based on a "Pyramid scheme" model. She had been persuaded by colleagues to join in, investing approximately 2,000 marks under the pseudonym "Zora". It was in the nature of the "game" that she had, in turn, recruited other players to it. When the facts emerged, hostile media delighted in describing her - almost certainly incorrectly - as a "passionate player" of the "game". She herself later condemned such schemes as "anti-social" ("...ein asoziales Spiel"). "I can only advise anyone [tempted to participate] not to touch it" (""Ich kann nur jedem raten, die Finger davon zu lassen""). She admitted that at the time she had "suppressed" ("verdrängt") her appreciation of the way that the defining principal of this game was that success was dependent on persuading other people to take part in it. Subsequently she shunned gambling, never participating in lotteries or visiting a casino.

Besides her work as a lawyer and her contributions to the Green Party Bundestag group, Anne Klein involved herself in professional associations. She was a member of the executive board of the "Berlin bar association" ("Rechtsanwaltskammer Berlin") between 1995 and 1997. Between June 1999 and December 2006 she served as president of the "Berlin Lawyer's Benevolent Association" ("Versorgungswerke der Rechtsanwälte in Berlin") she was able to implement support measures for members' dependents left behind following the deaths of same-sex partners. In the middle of 2006 Klein was elected vice-president of the "German Lawyers' Union" ("Anwaltunion Deutschland"), described by her former firm as a "nationally engaged coming together of high-profile professional lawyers in Germany" ("national agierenden Zusammenschluss renommierter Fachanwälte Deutschlands").

== Celebration ==
In 2012 the Heinrich Böll Foundation introduced the Anne Klein Women's Award in order to celebrate the memory of Anne Klein and "her fight to enforce women's rights to liberty". The foundation provides an annual prize to women committed to gender democracy.

== Personal ==
Anne Klein's life partnership, for almost 27 years, was with Barbara Binek. Following the relevant changes in legislation the two joined in a civil partnership.
Anne Klein's nephew is the prominent and internationally operating Pediatric Emergency Physician Dr Christian Pathak, who is especially known for his work with the Great Ormond Street Hospital in London and the Royal Flying Doctor Service in Australia.
