= Ilse Reichel-Koß =

German politician (1925–1993)

Ilse Reichel-Koß (born Ilse Pottgießer: 13 July 1925 – 17 December 1993) was a German politician (SPD). She served between 1971 and 1981 as the Berlin Senator for Family, Youth and Sport.

== Life ==
Ilse Pottgießer was born in the Wedding quarter on the north side of central Berlin. She grew up in the Reinickendorf district, a little to the north-west of Wedding. Her father was a belt maker by trade, closely associated with both the Social Democratic Party and the Trades Union movement.

At the start of 1933 the Nazis took power and lost little time in transforming Germany into a one-party dictatorship. In 1934 the polarising impact of the new regime came close to home after her father expelled Nazis from the youth welfare office where he was working. War resumed in September 1939 and Ilse Reichel's schooling concluded in 1942. She took a job as a technical draftswoman in a large AEG industrial plant in Berlin. It was her first experience of factory work, and she was struck by the extent to which individual human needs - including those touching on family life - could lose out to the needs of the plant production schedule: that was something she would seek to address when later in her life she was entrusted with political office.

Later she took a clerical job with the city administration (Magistrat von Berlin). Her political role model and then mentor between 1955 and 1962 became Ella Kay for whom she worked for several years. Between 1965 and 1971 she served as district councillor for youth and sport in Reinickendorf. Then, between 1971 and 1981, she served as a Berlin Senator. She remained a member of the Berlin regional parliament ("Abgeordnetenhaus") till 1989.

== Works ==
Under her leadership Reinickendorf was provided with its first adventure playground for children. In 1976 she opened the first women's refuge in West Berlin or West Germany. More than any other Berlin Senator, she was tireless in her support of the Citizens' Action Initiative (Bürgerinitiative). She was hugely supportive of initiatives and projects for child day care ("Eltern-Initiativ-Kindertagesstätten") to help working parents, and of other adventure playgrounds and women's refuges. In 1990 she took on the leadership of the "Gropius city north citizen's parent-children circle initiative" ("Bürgerinitiative Eltern-Kinder-Kreis Gropiusstadt Nord e.V."). Founded in 1969 this is believed to be the oldest operating citizen's action initiative group of its kind. She took over a riding school that had fallen on hard times on behalf of the group and successfully transformed it into the "Children's Groß-Ziethen Farm House" ("Kinderbauernhof Groß-Ziethen") which today carries her name.

Between 1971 and 1981 Ilse Reichel-Koß worked closely with Ingrid Stahmer. Just as Ella Kay had become an inspiration and mentor for Reichel-Koß, so Reichel-Koß performed a similar function for Stahmer. Later, as a member of the Berlin Senate between 1990 and 1994 and then as a member of the regional parliament till 1999, she was able to ensure powerful political backing for Stahmer with regard to creating and improving youth facilities in Berlin.
