= Ingrid Stahmer =

German politician (1942–2020)

Ingrid Stahmer (born Ingrid Ulrici: 16 September 1942 – 30 August 2020) was a German politician (SPD). She briefly served as vice mayor of Berlin.

In 1997, as the popular Berlin senator (councillor) responsible for schools, youth and sport she found herself defending the government's contentious spelling reforms to the press. Two years later she withdrew from politics and embarked on a career as an "organisation and process consultant" also identified as a "group dynamicist" ("Gruppendynamikerin").

== Life ==
Ingrid Ulrici was born in Mittersill, a small town some distance upriver from Salzburg and far from her mother's Berlin home. The remote location of her birth resulted from the disruption caused by the war. Many years later she would tell an interviewer that her parents had been planning for the birth of a son whom they intended to name Günter. Academically out-competing the boys became a theme of her time at school. Her father was killed in the war and she returned with her mother to Berlin where, in 1946, her mother remarried. The family moved to Bremen, which after the end of the war in May 1945 had become part of the British occupation zone. In May 1949 the British occupation zone was merged with the US occupation zone and the French occupation zone (but NOT the Soviet occupation zone) and relaunched as the US-sponsored German Federal Republic. In 1962, by this time the only girl in an otherwise all-male cohort, Ulrici passed her school final exams ("Abitur") which opened the way to higher education. She moved on to what was then known as the "Welfare Academy" ("Wohlfahrtsschule") in Bremen where she studied for and obtained a degree-level qualification in social work. A further period of study between 1971 and 1974 would see this complemented by a training qualification in Group Dynamics.

She joined the Social Democratic Party in 1964. The next year she married Günter Stahmer, who conspicuously would never share his wife's appetite for a high public profile. Between 1966 and 1971 she worked in the social services in Berlin's Charlottenburg district (part of the British occupation zone in a divided city). In 1971 she took a job with the Berlin Senate (city council), working as head of the working group for children's daycare centres in the section responsible for administration of family, youth and sport matters. Her responsibilities included overseeing the integration of handicapped and foreign children into the mainstream centres. During this period Ingrid Stahmer drew particular inspiration from the example of the Berlin senator Ilse Reichel-Koß. As the senator responsible for the department in which Stahmer was employed, Reichel-Koß was able to encourage Stahmer to take greater political responsibility.

== Public office ==
Within the local party she became department chairperson for Charlottenburg in 1978, being also a member of the district party executive and a delegate to the regional party conference. In 1981 she was elected to the Berlin city council, and was appointed as a vice city mayor and senator with responsibility for health and social welfare matters. She retained these offices until the Berlin city council election of 29 January 1989. Between 1985 and 1989 she topped the party poll in the Charlottenburg district for elections to the District Delegates Assembly ("Bezirksverordnetenversammlung" / BVV). During these years she combined her other duties with her role as chair of the regional party executive.

The political backdrop changed dramatically with "The Turnaround" of 1989, the political changes in East Germany in March 1990 and the formal reunification of the country and of its capital in October 1990. On 16 March 1989 Stahmer was elected senator with responsibility for health and social welfare matters and became vice city mayor in the new (still West) Berlin city council under the leadership of her SPD colleague, Walter Momper.

Following reunification in October 1990, the East Berlin "Magistrat" and the West Berlin senate were merged. In response to the resignation of Senator Anne Klein, Stahmer's senatorial remit was extended to include Women, Young People and Family, until the 1990 Berlin state election, which was timed to coincide with Germany's first post-reunification general election. In Berlin the |SPD received approximately 30% of the popular vote, placing it second to the CDU with approximately 40%. This result broadly echoed the national election: no party was in a position to run the city without a coalition partner, and what followed for Berlin was a governing "Grand coalition" of the CDU and the SPD, under the leadership of Eberhard Diepgen as governing mayor. In Diepgen's team Ingid Stahmer gave up the health part of her portfolio, but retained the core of her earlier portfolio as senator for Social Welfare.

In 1994 her SPD colleague in the Berlin senate Thomas Krüger was elected to the Bundestag: in the Berlin senate Stahmer took on his Youth and Family portfolio, also retaining her existing Social Welfare remit.

In the run-up to the 1995 Berlin state election Stahmer stood for election as the party's lead candidate ("Spitzenkandidat") – potentially the SPD candidate for governing mayor. Her principal rival was Walter Momper who had already served as governing mayor of West Berlin during the turbulent prelude to reunification. The campaigning approach of both contenders for the backing of party colleagues in the party poll was at times strangely consensual. In the event it was Ingrid Stahmer who won what amounted to the party nomination for the post of governing mayor. However, the political mood reflected in the local elections that followed continued to favour the CDU.

The local elections of October 1995 produced a disappointing result for the SPD in Berlin, but a "Grand coalition" of the CDU and the SPD continued to run the local administration. Stahmer's portfolio changed: between 1995 and 1999 she served as the senator for Schools, Young People and Sport. In 1999 she resigned from the senate and withdrew from her role as a frontline SPD city politician. From 2000 she worked on a self-employed basis in various consultancy functions.
