= Catherina Pieroth-Manelli =

German politician (born 1966)

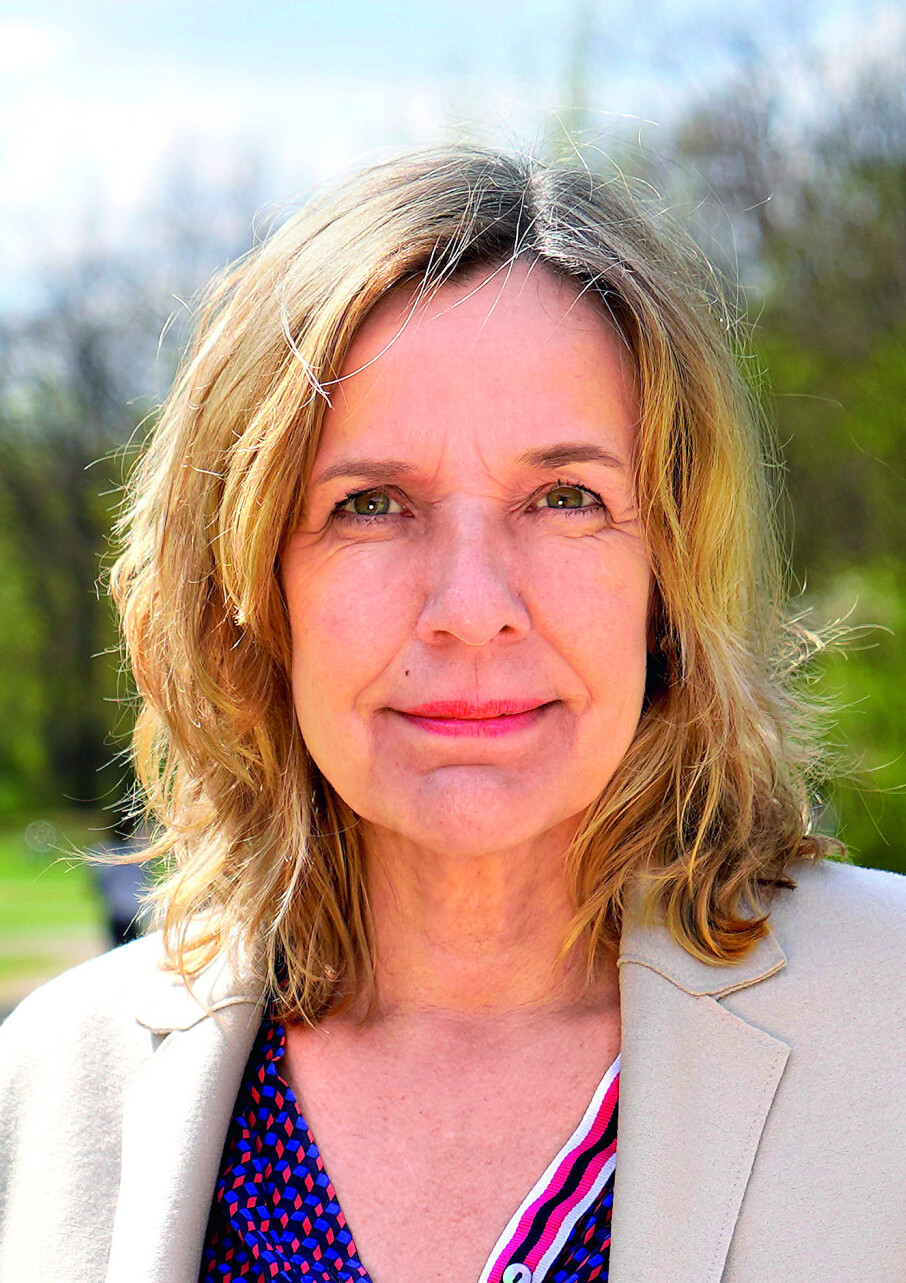
- Catherina Pieroth in 2022

Member of the Abgeordnetenhaus of Berlin
- Incumbent
- Assumed office 2016

Personal details
- Born: Catherina Pieroth; 16 December 1966 (age 59) Wiesbaden
- Party: Alliance 90/The Greens
- Parent: Elmar Pieroth (father)

Catherina Pieroth-Manelli (born 16 December 1966) is a German politician and member of the Abgeordnetenhaus of Berlin for the Alliance 90/The Greens.

== Biography ==
Catherina Pieroth was born to Hannelore and Elmar Pieroth. After training as a kindergarten teacher, she studied philosophy and educational sciences (MA). Later, she headed a communications agency. Since 2016, she has been a member of the Alliance 90/The Greens parliamentary group in the Abgeordnetenhaus of Berlin. There, she is spokesperson for health and a member of the Petitions Committee.

== Political career ==
Pieroth joined the Alliance 90/The Greens party in 2010 and became state director of the Berlin Greens in 2011. From 2012 to 2016, she served as managing director of their parliamentary group in the Abgeordnetenhaus. In the 2016 Berlin state election, she immediately won 30.7 percent of the first votes in the Tempelhof-Schöneberg 2 constituency, thus taking the constituency from the Social Democratic Party of Germany (SPD) to the Greens for the first time and entered the state parliament with a direktmandat. In the 2021 Berlin state election and the repeat election in 2023, she was able to defend her seat in the House of Representatives and increased her result to 36.9 percent.

From 2016 to 2021, Catherina Pieroth was her parliamentary group's spokesperson for science policy. She advocated for innovative research projects in the field of public health and gender-sensitive health. he contributed to restructuring the board of the state-owned Charité with a new position for human resources and nursing. Since 2016, Catherina Pieroth has also been her parliamentary group's spokesperson for health policy. In this role, she is committed to establishing multi-professional and low-threshold integrated care structures in Berlin, in which counseling, interpreting, and doctors come together under one roof across all social security laws. With the state programme Integrated Health, which she initiated, four community health centres have already been implemented in Berlin districts.

In 2018, Catherina Pieroth, together with her parliamentary group, was one of the first to call for a scientifically supported cannabis model project for Berlin, which forms the basis for today's (partial) legalization. She believes it is essential to link this project with more educational and preventive work. She played a key role in the introduction of the Berlin drug checking program as a "harm reduction" measure, which allows consumers to have substances tested for their ingredients.

Catherina Pieroth is one of the advocates of a Green Hospital program for the climate-efficient restructuring of the hospital system. In 2021, this program was also financially supported under the Green Party's government. "Climate protection is health protection," says Catherina Pieroth. In line with the Health in All Policies approach, Pieroth believes that decisive decisions for health are not only made in this policy area. Factors such as clean air and less noise also influence resilience. Exercise and good nutrition are also part of a healthy lifestyle and must be made equally available to everyone. Since 2020, she has advocated for fresh and regional food in hospitals and, in 2024, called on the German Bundesrat to push for the introduction of a sugar tax at the federal level.

Pieroth is a clear advocate for self-determination and women's health in the debate on abortion regulation. She has repeatedly publicly called for the repeal of Paragraph 219a of the German Criminal Code (advertising ban), which was repealed in 2022, and Section 218 of the German Criminal Code (criminalization of abortion).

Pieroth is one of the first signatories of the Berlin Mental Health Action Alliance, which is committed to improving psychosocial care in Berlin. Against this background, she is a supporter of a psychiatric budget that would remove the private welfare providers from the funding policy and instead advocate for self-managed budgets.

== Other activities ==
Catherina Pieroth is involved in the supervisory board of Cooperative Mensch eG, as the social participation of people with disabilities is, according to her own statement, a matter close to her heart.

As a volunteer board member of Goldrausch e. V., she supports female entrepreneurs and visual artists on their path to professionalism. The focus is exclusively on women, as they continue to be disadvantaged in the existing financial system and lending processes.

== See also ==
- List of members of the 19th Abgeordnetenhaus of Berlin (2021–2023)
- List of members of the 19th Abgeordnetenhaus of Berlin (2023–2026)
