= Annette Fugmann-Heesing =

German lawyer and politician

Berlin Senator of Finance
- Preceded by: Elmar Pieroth
- Succeeded by: Peter Kurth

Personal details
- Born: 6 January 1955 (age 71)
- Party: SDP

Annette Fugmann-Heesing (born January 6, 1955) is a German lawyer and politician of the Social Democratic Party (SPD). Over the course of her career, she served as State Minister of Finance in two different states, Hesse and Berlin.

== Political career ==
Fugmann-Heesing served as a member of the Abgeordnetenhaus of Berlin from 1999 until 2001.

== Other activities ==
=== Corporate boards ===
- RAG AG, member of the supervisory board (since 2011)
- Landesbank Berlin Holding, member of the supervisory board (1996–2001)

=== Non-profit organizations ===
- Berlinische Galerie, member of the board of trustees (since 2008)
- Stiftung St. Matthäus, Evangelical Church in Berlin, Brandenburg and Silesian Upper Lusatia, member of the board of trustees
- Bielefeld University, member of the university council (since 2008), member of the board of trustees (2003–2007)
