= Ralf Wieland =

German politician

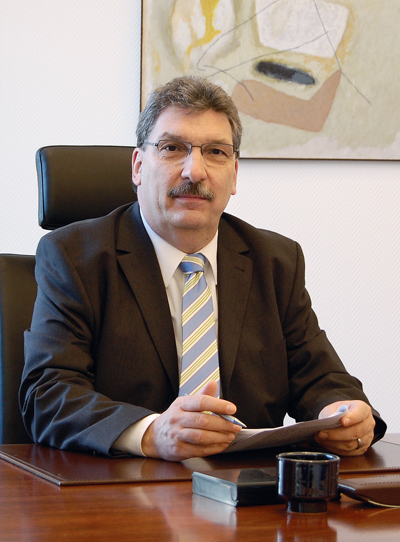
Ralf Wieland

Ralf Wieland (born 11 December 1956) is a German politician in the Social Democratic Party of Germany (SPD) in Berlin. He was President of the Abgeordnetenhaus of Berlin until 2021.

== Biography ==
Wieland was born in Wilhelmshaven. From 1975 to 1977 he trained as a shipping clerk and then worked until 1986 in the transport sector. From 1991 to 1995 he worked at the Berlin Senate Department for Construction and Housing, and from 1997 to 1999 at the Berlin Senate Department for Urban Development, Environmental Protection and Technology.

== Political career ==
Wieland joined the SPD in 1973, and moved to Berlin in 1977 and has held various party posts. Since the 1999 elections he has been a member of the Abgeordnetenhaus. In the 2011 elections he was directly elected in the constituency Mitte 6 with 32.5 percent. From 1999 to 2004 he was the chief executive of the Berlin SPD. From 2004 to 2011 he was chairman of the Budget Committee of the Abgeordnetenhaus.

In the Berlin elections in 2011, Wieland was re-elected to the Abgeordnetenhaus. As the hitherto reigning Abgeordnetenhaus President Walter Momper was not a candidate for the role on grounds of age, the SPD as the strongest party had to decide on Momper's successor. On 18 October 2011 in the SPD parliamentary group, Wieland prevailed against his party colleague Iris Spranger for the nomination. Wieland was elected President of the Abgeordnetenhaus on 27 October 2011 with the support of 129 of the 149 deputies.

== Other activities ==
- German United Nations Association (DGVN), Member
- German United Services Trade Union (ver.di), Member
