= Christiane Krajewski =

German politician

Berlin Senator of Finance
- Preceded by: Peter Kurth
- Succeeded by: Thilo Sarrazin

Personal details
- Born: 4 February 1949 (age 77)
- Party: SPD

Christiane Krajewski (born 4 February 1949) is a German politician (SPD). Krajewski was a finance senator for Berlin and minister in the Saarland.
