= Elmar Pieroth =

German politician (1934–2018)

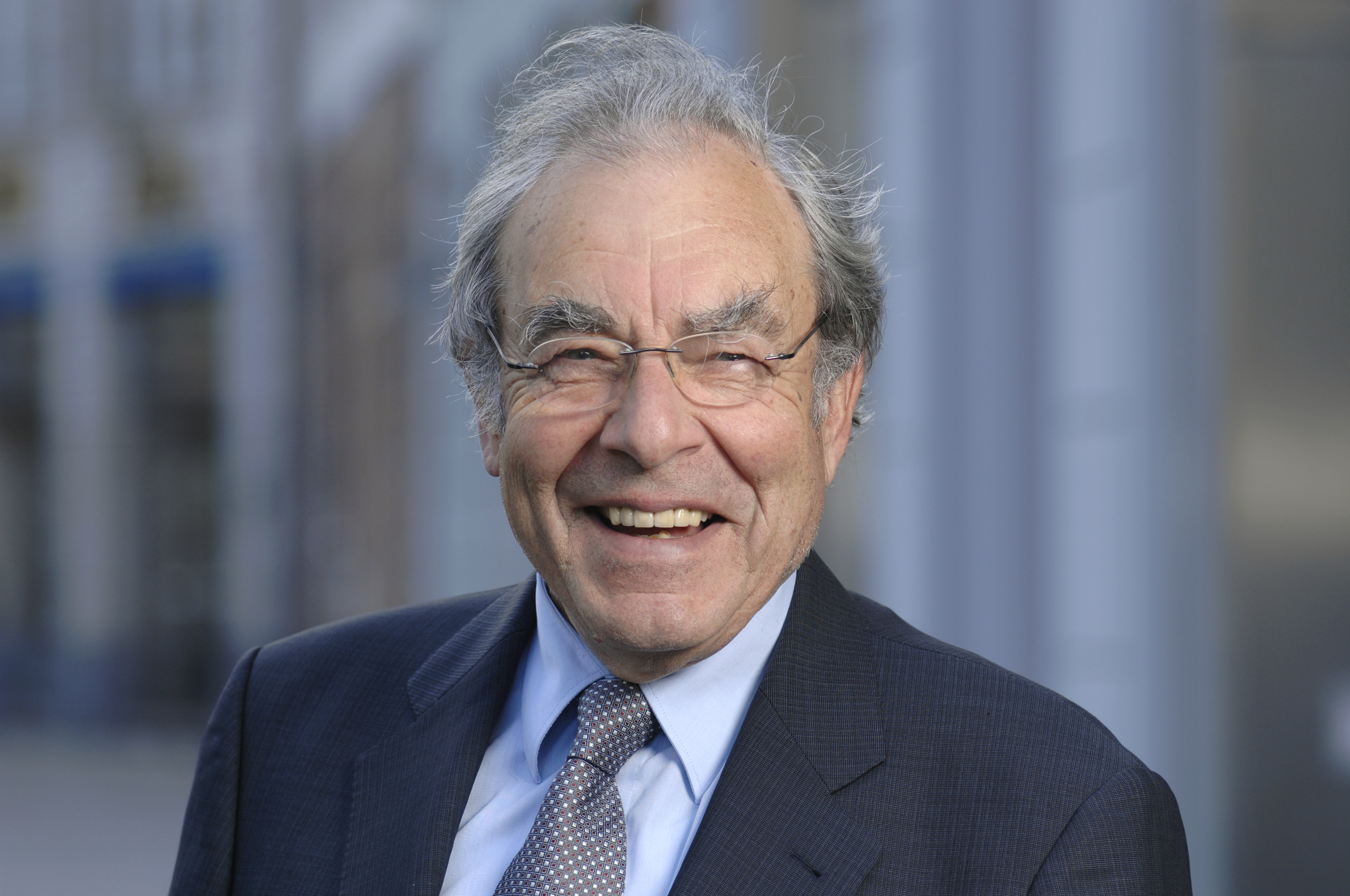

Berlin Senator of Finance
- Preceded by: Norbert Meisner
- Succeeded by: Annette Fugmann-Heesing

Personal details
- Born: November 9, 1934 Bad Kreuznach, West Germany
- Died: August 31, 2018 (aged 83) Berlin, Germany
- Party: CDU
- Children: Catherina Pieroth-Manelli

Elmar Pieroth (9 November 1934 – 31 August 2018) was a German politician (CDU). The businessman was a member of the Bundestag from 1969 until 1981. He was the senator for economic affairs in Berlin from 1981 until 1989 and from 1996 until 1998, as well as the Senator of Finance from 1991 until 1996.

== Early life ==
Pieroth was born on 9 November 1934 in Bad Kreuznach. He passed the Abitur exam at Stefan-George-Gymnasium in Bingen in 1953. He studied political economics, business management and political science in Munich and Mainz, completing his degree as a graduate economist in 1968.

=== Entrepreneur ===
At the age of 19, Elmar Pieroth started his entrepreneurial career. Instead of joining the wine growing business of his parents, he developed a new direct sales system and led the Afterwards, he built up the wine estate and wine trade company Ferdinand Pieroth GmbH.(WIV Wein International) to international success. In the 1960s, he already enabled employees to obtain equity holdings, which became known as the "Pieroth-Modell" In order to encourage other companies, he awarded an annual "Prize for the Encouragement of Capital Formation in Broad Segments". In addition to the usual financial balance he introduced social balances to the company in order enable the calculation of numerical results for parts of the social added value of the company. In the course of the theme "Humanisation of Work" he introduced a gradual transition into retirement and encouraged bringing along children to work. In 1969, he resigned from managing his own company in order to devote himself to his political work.

=== Politician ===
In 1965, Pieroth became a member of the CDU party. Since 1965, he was a board member of the association for medium-sized businesses (Mittelstandsvereinigung) and was the national chairman of the association from 1987 until 1993. From 1973 until 1981, he was the district chairman of the CDU party in Bad Kreuznach. In 1976, he became the chairman of the national committee for economic policy. From 1981 until 1993, he was a member of the federal committee of the CDU party and the national chairman of the association for medium-sized businesses (Mittelstandsvereinigung) of the CDU/CSU from 1987 until 1993.

His style in election campaigns caused a stir within the party. In 1969, he established "Canvassing" in Rhineland-Palatinate, which encourages personal visits of candidates at the electors' homes. In later election campaigns after the German Reunification, he invented the so-called "living room discussions" and publicly appeared together with Petra Pau, a candidate of the PDS.

=== Member of the Bundestag ===
From 1969 until 1981, he was a member of the Deutschen Bundestag, and a board member of the parliamentary group of the CDU/CSU-Bundestagsfraktion from 1972 until 1981. In 1980, he became a member of the parliamentary Economic and Financial Committee and spokesman of the parliamentary group of the CDU/CSU for economic cooperation and development aid.

=== Berlin Senator ===
From 1981 until 1996, Pieroth was a member of the Berlin House of Representatives. From 1981 until 1985, he was the Senator for Economics and Transport in the State Government of Richard von Weizsäcker. From 1985 until 1989, he was the Senator for Economics and Employment in the state government of Eberhard Diepgen. One of the most important projects of his mandate was the development of centres for technology and new businesses. In June 1990, he became the city councillor for economics of East Berlin in the municipality of Tino Schwierzina. In the same year, he became the chairman of the Advisory Council for the Introduction of Social Market Economy of the DDR for the Prime Minister of the DDR. From 1991 until 1996, he was the Senator of Finance in the state government of Eberhard Diepgen and from March 1991 until December 1994, he was a member of the administrative council of the trust institution. From 1996 until 1998, he was once more the Berlin Senator for Economics and Business. Finally, in 1998 he retired.

Due to his official functions, Pieroth became the chairman of the supervisory board of the (BVG) (BSR), of the Berlin water supply company, of the company for promotion of economic development and the Berlin harbour and warehouse businesses.

== Humanitarian involvement ==
In 1961, Pieroth started an aid project together with employees of his company to help farmers in West African Togo. In 1971, he initiated the lending of micro-credits to 34.000 farmers and craftsman in Burkina Faso up to today. Since 2001, Elmar Pieroth is the chairman of the society "Most-Brücke von Berlin nach Mittel- und Osteuropa e.V." In 2007, he founded the "Stiftung Bürgermut" of Berlin and acts as the chairman of the charity's board of trustees.

== Wine adulteration ==
In 1985, during Pieroth's Senate tenure, the 1985 diethylene glycol wine scandal exploded. Many German wine producers, including the company he founded, were found to have adulterated their wines with the notoriously toxic diethylene glycol to increase their sweetness, a desired characteristic of many types of German wine.

== Bibliography ==
- Elmar Pieroth (Hrsg.): Sozialbilanzen in der Bundesrepublik Deutschland. Goldmann Verlag, 1978.
- Elmar Pieroth: Mensch und Kapital. Band 1:Die 8 Stunden am Tag. ECON-Verlag, Düsseldorf / Wien 1974.
- Kurt Faltlhauser: Miteigentum – Das Pieroth-Modell in der Praxis. ECON-Verlag, Düsseldorf / Wien 1971.
