= Norbert Meisner =

German politician

Berlin Senator of Finance
- Preceded by: Günter Rexrodt
- Succeeded by: Elmar Pieroth

Personal details
- Born: November 7, 1942 (age 83) Berlin, Germany
- Party: SPD

Norbert Meisner (born November 7, 1942) is a German politician (SPD). He was a Finance senator for Berlin.
