= Michaele Schreyer =

German politician

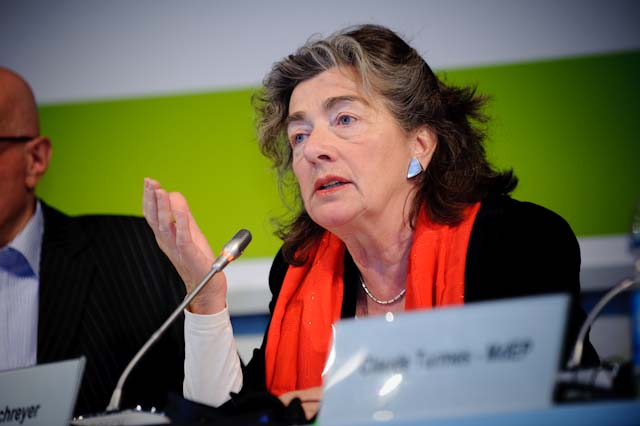
- Schreyer in 2010

European Commissioner for Budget
- In office 1999–2004
- President: Romano Prodi
- Preceded by: Erkki Liikanen
- Succeeded by: Marcos Kyprianou

State Minister for Urban Development of Berlin
- In office 2000–2004

Personal details
- Born: 9 August 1951 (age 75) Cologne, West Germany
- Education: University of Cologne

Michaele Schreyer (born 9 August 1951) is a German politician of Alliance 90/The Greens who served as a European Commissioner from September 1999 to November 2004, holding the budget portfolio.

== Education ==
Schreyer wrote her doctoral thesis on tax federalism at the University of Cologne.

== Political career ==
From 1983 until 1987, Schreyer worked as an advisor on financial policy to the Green Party's parliamentary group in the Bundestag.

In 1989, Schreyer was appointed State Minister for Urban Development in the government of Governing Mayor Walter Momper of Berlin. In the 1990 state elections, she was elected to the Abgeordnetenhaus of Berlin. Between 1995 and 1997, she served as chairwoman of the Sub-Committee on Public Housing. In 1998, she assumed the leadership of the Green Party's parliamentary group, alongside Renate Künast.

=== European Commissioner, 2000–2004 ===
In 2000, Germany's Chancellor Gerhard Schröder nominated Schreyer, alongside Günter Verheugen, as one of two German members of the European Commission under President Romano Prodi. In the Prodi Commission, Schreyer took on an enlarged portfolio for control of the 80 billion euro ($83.73 billion) budget of the European Union.

During Schreyer's time in office, the European Commission filed a high-profile civil lawsuit in the United States against Philip Morris International and R. J. Reynolds Tobacco Company seeking damages for what it called their involvement with organized crime in smuggling cigarettes into Europe. By 2004, Schreyer and Philip Morris had negotiated a settlement under which the company agreed to pay about $1 billion over 12 years.

== Other activities ==
- European Youth Parliament – Germany, Member of the Board of Trustees
- European Movement Germany, Vice President
- Schwarzkopf Foundation, Member of the Board
- Heinrich Böll Foundation, Member of the Supervisory Board (2007–2014)

Schreyer is co-author (with Lutz Mez) of the publication "ERENE – European Community for Renewable Energy".

Political offices
Preceded by ?	German European Commissioner; 2000-2004	Succeeded by ?
