= Ella Kay =

Berlin politician (1895 - 1988)

- Born: Ella Johanna Hedwig Luise Kay; 16 December 1895; Berlin-Wedding, Germany
- Died: 3 February 1988 (aged 92); Berlin, Germany
- Occupations: Politician; Resistance activist Mayor
- Political party: SPD

Ella Kay (16 December 1895 – 3 February 1988) was a Berlin city politician (SPD) with a particular interest in workers' welfare and youth matters. During the Hitler years she became a resistance activist: she focused on looking after victims of government persecution. Despite being subject to surveillance and frequent visits from the security services, she avoided arrest.

After 1945 she found herself in the Soviet occupation zone where, during 1946, she was elected mayor of the district of Berlin-Prenzlauer Berg. She was removed from office in December 1947 by the military administrators. After 1948 the differences implicit in the administrative division of Berlin into four separately controlled military occupation zones began to find increasingly intrusive resonances in administrative and physical differences, especially as between the eastern part of the city, controlled by the Soviets, and the three other sectors of the city, which by this time were coming to be known collectively as West Berlin. In or before 1949 Ella Kay relocated to West Berlin, where, between 1955 and 1962, she served as Senator for Youth and Sport.

== Life ==
=== Provenance and early years ===
Ella Johanna Hedwig Luise Kay was born in Berlin-Wedding. Her father was politically engaged, both as a trades unionist and as a member of the Social Democratic Party (Sozialdemokratische Partei Deutschlands / SPD). Money was tight. He had no pension, and at the age of 72 was still working as a labourer for a Reinickendorf farmer. (Note: A generation later he would have had difficulty finding farm work in Reinickendorf which urbanised and industrialised rapidly in response to the mass migration to Berlin from the countryside during the final decades of the nineteenth century. During the first decades of the twentieth century a large unbuilt area on the edge of the municipality used hitherto for military training was redeveloped as Tempelhof Airport.) Many years later, looking back on her childhood, she would reminisce ruefully: "The so-called good old days never were". (Note: "Die so genannte gute alte Zeit hat es nie gegeben.") Kay attended school locally and trained for a qualification in office work. The apprenticeship remained uncompleted, however: after her father died she was obliged immediately to find factory work in order to provide financial support for the family. She worked as a cutter in a clothing factory.

=== German republic ===
As the November revolution unfolded, the proclamation of the German republic by the leading SPD politician Philipp Scheidemann on 9 November 1918, was an important moment for Ella Kay, by this time ages twenty-three. She herself had joined the textile workers' trades union in 1917, and towards the end of 1919, following her father's example, she became a member of the Social Democratic Party (Sozialdemokratische Partei Deutschlands / SPD). She joined the newly founded "Workers' Welfare" ("Arbeiterwohlfahrt" / AWO) organisation at the same time, quickly becoming actively involved in both. For many commentators the early 1920s in Germany were dominated by political unrest driven by economic austerity and hunger, topped off by currency collapse, but there were also some positive developments. A long-standing demand from labour activists for an Eight-hour working day to be signed into law was enacted for heavy industries and munitions factories in November 1918 and was quickly implemented across industry. The benefit for Ella Kay, as a factory worker, was immediate: she now had her evenings free to pursue her own further education.

After the 1923 currency reform, with the party again able to pay salaries, Ella Kay took a job at the party head office in Berlin's Lindenstraße. She worked in the department concerned with workers' welfare and the women's secretariat. (There was, at the time, no separate department dedicated to workers' welfare.) Although "cocoa was occasionally distributed", the AWO did not have the resources to operate as a charity on its own terms. Instead it worked with public authorities, identifying where a specific need arose and then campaigning directly with the public body (potentially) involved for the needs and entitlements of those disadvantaged. The nature of her work changed in the middle of the decade when she started work in the youth office in her own district, Berlin-Prenzlauer Berg. While working as a youth welfare officer, Kay also embarked on a traineeship in care work more broadly. She combined this, from 1924, with work as a district councillor. Later, between 1929 and 1933, she served as a member of the Berlin city council. Members were allocated fixed seats for a legislative term. Incongruously, during one term, Ella Kay found herself sitting next to Joseph Goebbels for council meetings. During this time a new approach to youth welfare work was developed in Prenzlauer Berg, in response to the intensifying impoverishment and surging unemployment that took hold in Germany as the Great Depression spread across from the west. Between 1927 and 1933 Ella Kay worked in Prenzlauer Berg as head of the department responsible for youth day-care centres in the district.

In December 1927 she enrolled at the Socio-political seminar of the German Politics Academy ("Deutsche Hochschule für Politik"). Classes took place in the evenings, which made it possible for her to combine her studies with her paid day job. Thanks to a recent dispensation by the Prussian minister for public welfare the training courses at the academy, originally intended only for male social work students, could now also be made available to women. Applicants were selected on the basis of interviews, subject to satisfactory previous qualifications and experience. Ella Kay was the first female student to be accepted onto the course. A contemporary fellow-student and political soul-mate with whom Kay formed a what would prove a lasting friendship was Franz Neumann.

=== Crisis years ===
As the economic position deteriorated, politics in Germany were becoming increasingly polarised nationally, with the division particularly stark in Berlin. In 1931 unemployment reached more than four million, while wages were reduced. Social security benefits had been progressively reduced. For working class young people the future looked grim. Interviewed decades later, Ella Kay shared her assessment that the high levels of unemployment had been "manufactured" in order to intimidate the workers. Two general elections in 1932 left the Reichstag (German parliament) deadlocked. The populist National Socialist Party and the Soviet backed Communist Party between them had too many seats to be left out of a governing coalition, but they were both unacceptable as coalition partners to the more moderate centre-right and centre-left political parties. In January 1933 the National Socialists exploited the political deadlock to take power, and lost no time in transforming Germany into a one-party dictatorship. One egregious piece of legislation, passed by the government on 7 April 1933, was the Gesetz zur Wiederherstellung des Berufsbeamtentums, shortened to Berufsbeamtengesetz (literally, "Law for the Restoration of the Professional Civil Service") which was designed to remove from public office people who might be considered Jewish or anti-Nazi. In Prenzlauer Berg 40 senior public officials, 210 local government employees and 31 "blue collar" workers were sent into retirement or otherwise removed from their jobs for reasons of politics or race. Ella Kay was one of the first to go.

=== After democracy ===
The first six months under the Hitler government set that pattern for the full twelve year Nazi nightmare. To their enemies, the National Socialists brought bloody terror onto the streets. It was the Communists who found themselves at the top of the security services' target list, but politically involved SPD members also found their meetings under attack from Nazi paramilitaries. The party responded with a rapid increase in the membership of Reichsbanner Schwarz-Rot-Gold, an organisation originally set up in 1924 as a response to Freikorps activism and widespread civil unrest, with the stated goal of defending parliamentary democracy against "subversion and extremism". In 1933, its membership increased to 160,000, the Reichsbanner created a "protection formation" to protect SPD meeting from ad hoc Hitlerite thuggery. After she lost her job in April 1933, Ella Kay was unemployed for nearly two years. Between April and June 1933 she found herself attending party meetings and rallies "almost every evening, to warn [party comrades] about the Nazis". In retrospect, it is possible to conclude that such warnings were both unnecessary and far too late.

During the first half of 1933 trades unions were outlawed and their offices taken over by the National Socialists. A series of steps taken during March 1933 amounted to the banning of the Communist Party. The ban on the SPD followed, formally, on 22 June 1933, by which time many of the party buildings and other assets had already been confiscated. The ban coincided with the so-called Köpenick week of bloodshed ("Köpenicker Blutwoche"), a week of arrests, torture and killings by Nazi paramilitaries in and around the Berlin suburb of Köpenick, which seems to have been intended to persuade politically active non-Nazis to abandon political activism. High profile SPD leaders including Marie Juchacz and Ernst Reuter lived in the affected districts. Juchacz fled to France while Reuter resigned his Reichstag seat and spent two years in a concentration camp before he, too, fled abroad. Many other SPD activists felt they could not emigrate because they feared for the safety of family members left behind if they did. Ella Kay stayed on in Germany, surviving on casual work. Eventually she found cleaning work. At one stage she set up a little laundry business in Berlin-Neukölln. Later, during the later war years, she was employed as a typist. During the first couple of years under National Socialism, in Berlin, it was still possible to meet up with party comrades in a social context, for instance by attending dance events at the Neue Welt (dance hall). The music was loud, and as Kay later explained to an interviewer, "while you danced together, you could also talk together". Friends and professional/political comrades from before 1933 with whom she managed to sustain some level of contact included Minna Todenhagen, Otto Ostrowski and Erna Maraun. Nevertheless, as a known member of the outlawed SPD, Kay was kept under increasingly effective surveillance, and unannounced visits, house searches and interrogations from the security services were not infrequent. Her work as a city councillor in the years before 1933 meant that on the streets of Prenzlauer-Berg Ella Kay was often picked out, and some of those picking her out were young men living locally who had gained new status by donning the uniforms of Nazi paramilitaries and who might, after dark, be involved in the security service raids on her little apartment. Feeling threatened, she therefore relocated to a small weekend home on the shores of the Müggelsee, just outside Berlin on its south-eastern side (and thereby a considerable distance from Prenzlauer Berg on the north side of the city). At times the little Müggelsee house was used to hide people from representatives of government agencies. Some sources describe it as Ella Kay's "hiding place", and although it was not entirely spared from security service house searches, these do seem to have been less frequent and less intrusive than they had been in her apartment in the city suburb.

Various sources mention her Nazi-era membership of the resistance group around Max Fechner, but without elaborating on what this involved. Interviewed during the final years of her life, Kay avoided spelling out the nature and extent of her resistance activism. It is known that some of the resistance activists among her friends and contacts were involved in hiding Jews in order to preserve them from the extermination camps, which supportse inference that Kay was similarly engaged.

At one of the last visits - possibly the final visit - Kay received from the Nazi security services, an arrest warrant ordering her transfer to the women's concentration camp at Ravensbrück was brought for her. However, she was not present when the responsible official arrived to deliver the document: It is not clear whether she would have faced immediate arrest if she had been there. Either way, because of the requirement that the warrant be delivered "in person", it was not executed either then nor, thanks to the gathering chaos that descended on administrative structures in Germany during the final months of the war, subsequently. Relatively few details survive as to of how Kay lived during those years, but "casual meetings in small groups" at which one of the friends could pass on information discovered by listening (illegally) to foreign radio stations meant that she was not totally unaware of the unfolding of the war and other internationally reported events. The collapse of the National Socialist régime in May 1945 did not, therefore, come as a complete surprise to Kay.

=== Soviet occupation zone ===
When news came through that the war and Adolf Hitler were over, Ella Kay set out for Prenzlauer Berg. The walk from Müggelheim, across what was left of Berlin, took her eleven hours. Twelve years after her eviction from the town hall, she now returned and reported for duty. The entire eastern part of Berlin, which included Prenzlauer Berg, was now being administered by the Soviet military. Most of the district mayors in the Soviet occupation zone had been (and now became again) Communist Party members. Ella Kay was not, and returned to her earlier work heading up the youth welfare office. Although she never joined the Communist Party, during 1946 or 1947 the authorities installed her as mayor of Prenzlauer-Berg.

Before the dictatorship, relations between the Communists and the Social Democrats had been poor and deteriorating. After 1945 a widespread belief would emerge from all parts of the political spectrum that it was only on account of divisions on the political left that the National Socialists had been able to take power. As the war drew to its close concentration camp inmates from both the Communist and Social Democratic side had sworn that after the war they would work together to build a better world. Nevertheless, in municipalities across the Soviet zone (where the Communists were far more politically powerful than in the three "western" zones) mutual mistrust very soon became the order of the day. The first thing Ella Kay did on returning to Prenzlauer Berg was to seek out former Social Democratic comrades who had held political office in the municipality before 1933. Together they set about the work of clearing away the rubble in order that rebuilding might commence. Conditions were grim. Kay later told an interviewer that if there was something to celebrate, then those participating would first need to get hold of a pan of fat in order that a banquet of fried potato peelings might be prepared. (Note: "Festessen waren selbstgebratene Bouletten aus Kartoffelschalen.") Presumably in other parts of town communist comrades would be undertaking the same back-breaking work and celebrating any high points together in much the same way.

During those post war months the SPD, no longer outlawed, was rebuilt in the Soviet zone. As she later told an interviewer, Kay was also involved in "endless meetings with the communists about a unification between the two parties, but without a result". (Note: "In endlosen Versammlungen haben wir damals mit der KPD über die Vereinigung der beiden Parteien diskutiert, ohne Ergebnis.") In a hastily organised poll of Berlin SPD members held on 31 March 1946 party, 82% of the party members voting in the western sectors of Berlin opposed a party merger. The ballot in the Soviet administered eastern sector of Berlin was suppressed by the military authorities. Following a subsequent ballot of SPD members on a more nuanced motion it was nevertheless reported that a majority of those voting had supported a "working alliance" ("Aktionsbündnis") between the SPD and the Communist Party. During April 1946 a meeting, which came to be known as the "Unification Congress", was held at the Admiralspalast (normally an entertainment venue), attended by delegates from both the SPD and the Communist Party. However SPD delegates from the western sector, who had already held their own congress on the same issue two weeks earlier, stayed away, believing that the party merger idea had already been rejected. The "Unification Congress" on 21/22 April 1946 unanimously endorsed the party merger, although in reality their decision had no effect in Germany other than in the Soviet occupation zone. Since Ella Kay lived and had her political base in Prenzlauer Berg, she was a "citizen" of the Soviet occupation zone. Following the contentious "Unification Congress" hundreds of thousands of Communist Party members, along with a large number of SPD members in the Soviet zone, lost no time in signing their party membership across to the new Socialist Unity Party ("Sozialistische Einheitspartei Deutschlands" / SED), which over the next three or four years became the ruling party in a new kind of German one-party dictatorship. Ella Kay did not. She remained a member of the now much diminished "East German" Social Democratic Party, resisting on-going government pressure to move over to the new party. Later in 1946, as a result of a messy agreement between the occupying powers, free municipal elections were held, as one result of which Ella Kay was elected district mayor in Berlin-Prenzlauer Berg. (Hitherto she had occupied the position through nomination by the military authorities.) But she still remained loyal to the SPD, and in December 1947 she was removed from office by the military administrators.

1948 was the year of the Berlin Blockade and airlift, following increasingly intractable negotiations between the former wartime allies over currency reform. In October 1949 the Soviet occupation zone was relaunched as the Soviet-sponsored German Democratic Republic (East Germany). The three "western" occupation zones had already come together, five months earlier and been relaunched as the US-sponsored German Federal Republic (West Germany). By this time Ella Kay no longer lived in Prenzlauer Berg. She had relocated to what was now becoming known as West Berlin.

=== West Berlin ===
In the west her political career continued. In 1949 Kay took on the leadership of the city's Central Youth Office, in an administrative post which meant that her direct boss was the mayor, at this time Ernst Reuter. It was only in 1955 that the office responsible for youth welfare became a fully-fledged department of the West Berlin city administration. On 21 January 1955 Ella Kay was appointed West Berlin's first Senator for Youth and Sport, remaining in office till her retirement on 6 December 1962. In 1958 she was also elected to membership of the Berlin state parliament, in which she continued to sit till 1968, three years after her retirement from the city senate.
