= Walter Momper =

German politician (born 1945)

Walter Momper Regierender Bürgermeister a.D.
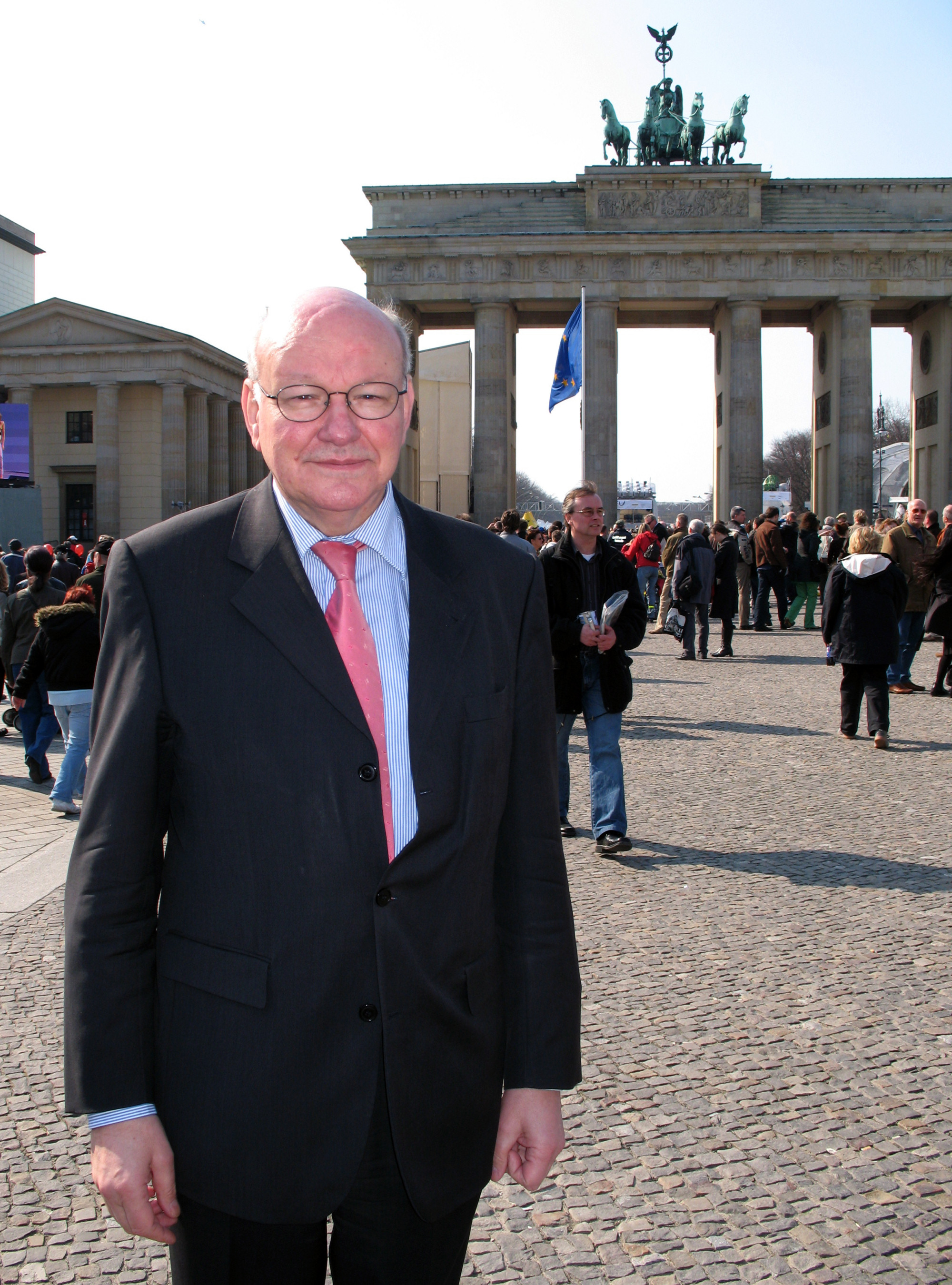
- Momper at the Brandenburg Gate in 2007

Governing Mayor of Berlin (West Berlin until 3 October 1990)
- In office 16 March 1989 – 24 January 1991
- President: Richard von Weizsäcker
- Chancellor: Helmut Kohl
- Deputy: Ingrid Stahmer
- Preceded by: Eberhard Diepgen
- Succeeded by: Eberhard Diepgen (Unified Berlin)

President of the Abgeordnetenhaus of Berlin
- In office 19 November 2001 – 27 October 2011
- Preceded by: Reinhard Führer
- Succeeded by: Ralf Wieland

Member of the Abgeordnetenhaus of Berlin
- In office 2 March 1975 – 18 September 2011
- Constituency: Social Democratic Party List

President of the Bundesrat
- In office 1 November 1989 – 31 October 1990
- Preceded by: Björn Engholm
- Succeeded by: Henning Voscherau

Personal details
- Born: 21 February 1945 (age 81) Sulingen, Lower Saxony, Germany
- Party: Social Democratic Party

Walter Momper (born 21 February 1945) is a German politician of the SPD (Social Democrats) and former Governing Mayor of Berlin (West Berlin 1989–1990, reunited Berlin 1990–1991). Whilst Governing Mayor, he served as President of the Bundesrat in 1989–90. He was at the opening of the Brandenburg Gate on 22 December 1989 and, on 3 October 1990, became the first mayor of a reunited Berlin.

== Biography ==
Momper was born in Sulingen (near Bremen), today Lower Saxony. He went to school in Bremen. After leaving school in 1964, he began studying political science, history, and economics at the Westfälische Wilhelms-Universität Münster, Munich, and the Freie Universität Berlin, which he left in 1969 as a graduate in political science. He became a research assistant at the Institute of Political Sciences at the FU Berlin. In 1970, he became a research fellow at the Secret Prussian State Archives of the Prussian Cultural Heritage Foundation. From 1972 to 1986, he was a research associate and director of the Historical Commission in Berlin. After a time during which Momper was exclusively concerned with politics, from 1992 to 1993 he was the director of the Dr. Elling GmbH. Since August 1993, he has been managing partner of Momper Entwicklungsgesellschaft mbH in Berlin. Critics and politicians of other parties have repeatedly criticised him over the links between his political and business activities, for example when he advised the IKEA group about its plans to establish itself in the East of Berlin.

=== Political career ===
Momper has been a member of the SPD since 1967. From 1986 to 1992, he was regional chairman of the SPD in Berlin. From 1988 to 1993, he was also a member of the SPD National Executive. In 1975, Momper was elected to the Berlin House of Representatives, where, from 1985, he was chairman of the SPD group. The SPD emerged under Momper’s leadership from the elections in Berlin in 1989 as the winner, while the CDU / FDP coalition led by mayor Eberhard Diepgen (CDU) suffered a surprise heavy defeat. The scandal concerning Wolfgang Antes (CDU) who was in charge of construction in Charlottenburg figured heavily in the media. On 16 March 1989, Momper was elected mayor. His support came from a Red-Green coalition between the SPD and the Alternative List (AL) (the former Berlin equivalent of the Greens). The Senate under Momper was the first Land government in Germany with more women than men (eight to six).

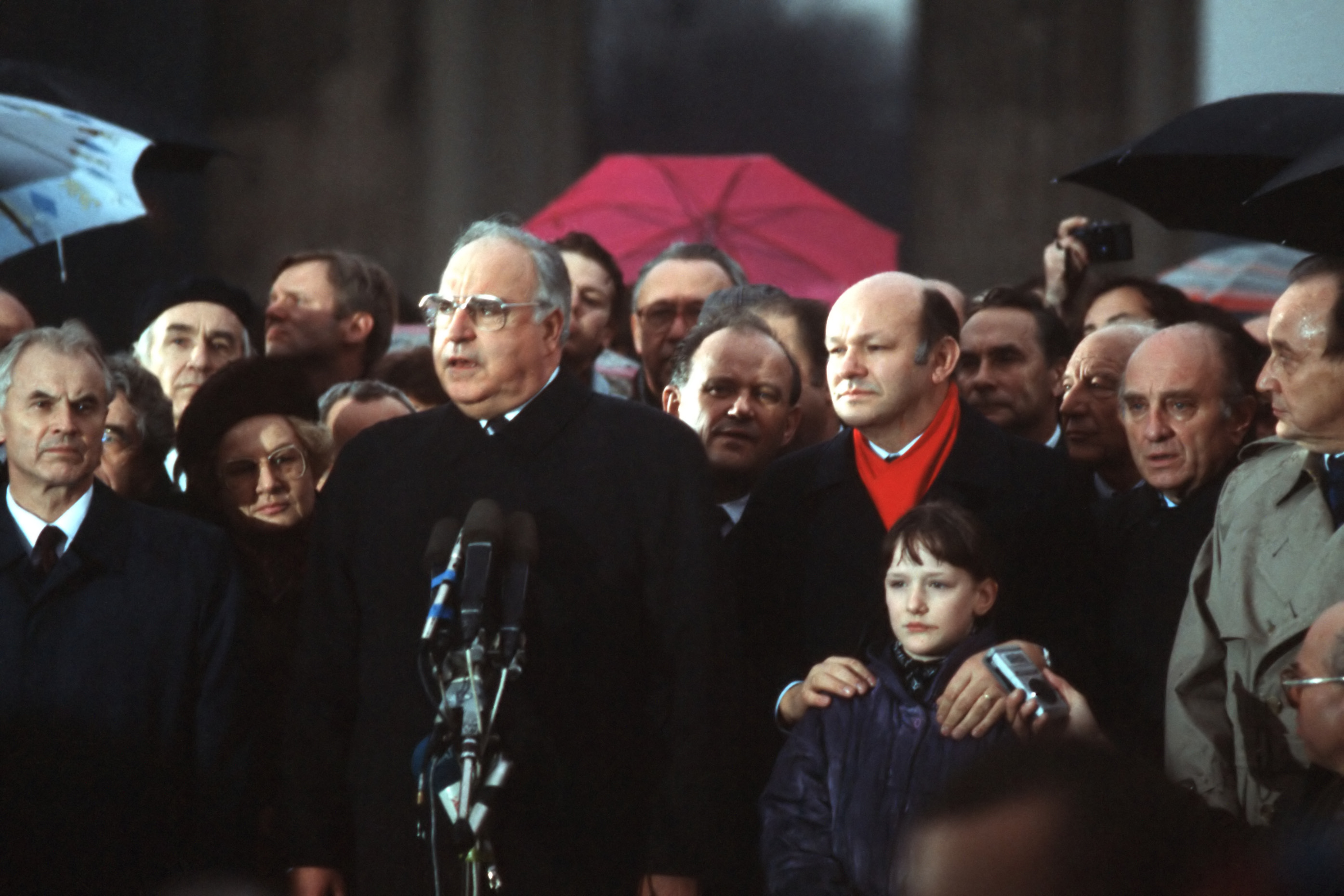
Momper standing alongside West German Chancellor Helmut Kohl (at the microphone), East German Premier Hans Modrow (left) in the official opening of the Brandenburg Gate, 1989

On the night of 9 to 10 November 1989, the Berlin Wall was opened. Momper claims that he had been aware of the preparations of the East German government for this event since 29 October 1989 from a conversation with Günter Schabowski, leader of the SED in East Berlin, and Erhard Krack, Mayor of East Berlin, and that he had made the appropriate preparations. Momper’s call "Berlin, now rejoice" went around the world and made him known beyond Germany. The foundations for the growing together of the two halves of the city and Berlin with the surrounding area were agreed on 12 December 1989 when Momper met Hans Modrow, the Prime Minister of the GDR, and the provisional Regional Committee was established as the first cross-border body.

As governing mayor of Berlin, Momper was from 1 November 1989 to 31 October 1990 president of the Federal Council Bundesrat and thus deputy to the president.

Among the best-known decisions of his red-green Senate was a speed limit (100 km/h) on the AVUS (where speed had previously been unrestricted) and the establishment of additional bus lanes for BVG, the Berlin public transport system. After the police had cleared a series of squats on the Mainzer Straße on 14 November 1990, the AL announced that it would not go into coalition with the SPD, since both Momper and the Innensenator concerned, Erich Paetzold (SPD), regarded this action as sound politics.

Accordingly, Momper led an SPD-minority Senate into the election of the Chamber of Deputies on 2 December 1990. The SPD ended up ten points behind the CDU, whose leading candidate, Diepgen, Momper’s predecessor, was then elected mayor again on 24 January 1991.

Momper remained SPD state chairman, but finally resigned on 17 August 1992, when he went into the real estate business. In 1995 he put himself forward in the internal party primary election of the Berlin SPD to be the party's lead candidate for the Berlin House of Representatives elections, but was narrowly defeated by Ingrid Stahmer, the Senator (city councillor) for Health and Social Welfare. Before the city election in October 1995, he resigned from the Berlin state assembly.

In 1999 he defeated the chairman of the SPD parliamentary group in the Berlin House, Klaus Böger, for the leading place among the SPD’s candidates and was indeed again a member of the Chamber of Deputies, but trailed well behind Diepgen, the mayor. However, he was elected vice president of the Chamber of Deputies.

After the SPD had become the strongest party in the early general elections on 21 October 2001, which were held early, he was elected president of the Chamber of Deputies and remained in this position after the elections in Berlin of 2006.

In the election to the Berlin House of Representatives on 18 September 2011, Momper decided not to run again. On 1 September 2011, he chaired his last meeting of the Chamber of Deputies.

== Personal life ==
Momper commonly went out in public wearing a red scarf, which became known as the "Momper Scarf". Momper is married to Anne Momper and has two children.

Political offices
Preceded by Eberhard Diepgen	Mayor of West Berlin; 1989–1990	Succeeded by Reunification
Preceded by Reunification	Mayor of Berlin; 1990–1991	Succeeded by Eberhard Diepgen
Preceded by Reinhard Führer	President of the Landtag of Berlin; 2001–2011	Succeeded by -
