= German Namibians =

People descended from ethnic German colonists living in present-day Namibia

German Namibians Deutschnamibier Duitse Namibiërs
Total population
- c. 30,000 (c. third of White Namibians)

Regions with significant populations
- Central and South Namibia

Languages
- German, Afrikaans, English

Religion
- Roman Catholic, Lutheran

Related ethnic groups
- White Namibians, Afrikaners, White South Africans, German South Africans

German Namibians (German: Deutschnamibier; Afrikaans: Duitse Namibiërs) are a community of people descended from ethnic German colonists who settled in present-day Namibia. In 1883, the German trader Adolf Lüderitz bought what would become the southern coast of Namibia from Josef Frederiks II, a chief of the local Oorlam people, and founded the city of Lüderitz. The German government, eager to gain overseas possessions, annexed the territory soon after, proclaiming it German South West Africa (German: Deutsch-Südwestafrika). Small numbers of Germans subsequently immigrated there, many coming as soldiers (German: Schutztruppe), traders, diamond miners, or colonial officials. In 1915, during the course of World War I, Germany lost its colonial possessions, including South West Africa (see History of Namibia) to the Western Allies; after the war, the former German colony was administered as a South African mandate. Roughly half of the German settlers were allowed to remain and, until independence in 1990, German remained one of the three official languages of the territory, alongside Afrikaans and English.

== Language ==
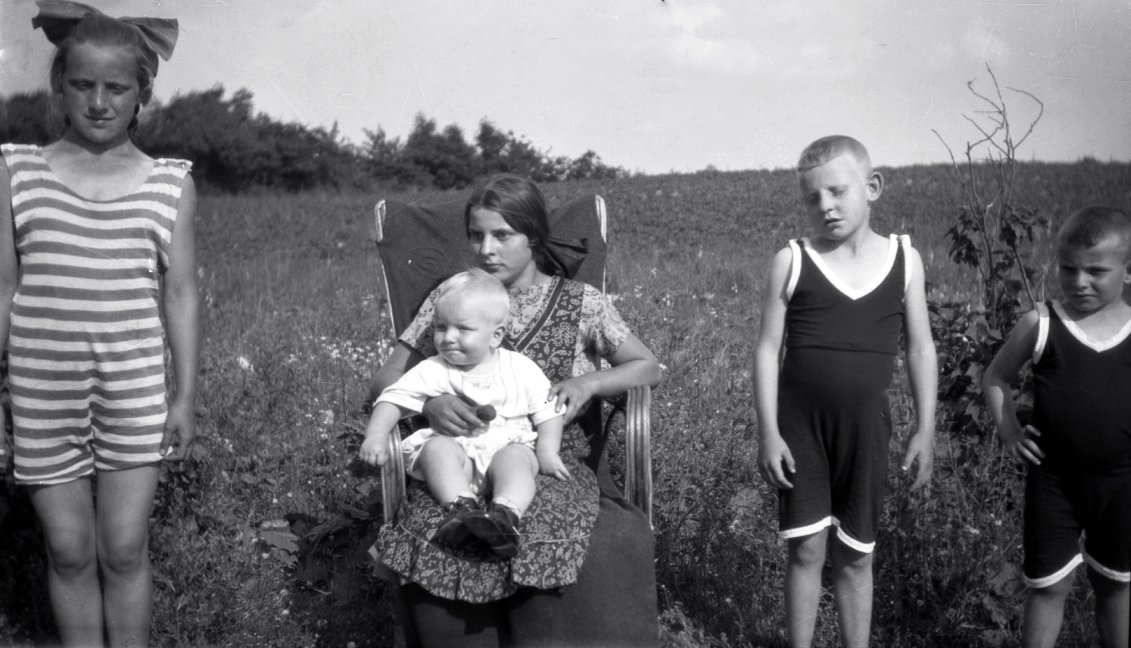
German family in Keetmanshoop, 1926

Today, English is the country's sole official language, but about 30,000 Namibians of German descent (around 2% of the country's overall population) and possibly 15,000 black Namibians (many of whom returned from East Germany after Namibian independence as well as the German reunification) still speak German or Namibian Black German, respectively.

German Namibians retain a fully-fledged culture in German within Namibia, with German-medium schools, churches, and broadcasting. Television, music and books from Germany are widely popular in the community. Often German Namibian youth attend university or technical school in Germany. This is despite the fact that in most areas and in Windhoek, the broader lingua franca is Afrikaans while English is now often the sole language used in many other spheres such as government or on public signs and product packaging. Unlike in South Africa, German Namibians have not been absorbed into the larger Afrikaans- and English-speaking communities. However, two thirds of all German Namibians are fluent in Afrikaans and are either familiar with English or can speak it fluently. German and Afrikaans (along with its parent language Dutch) are closely related Germanic languages.

== History of German settlement ==
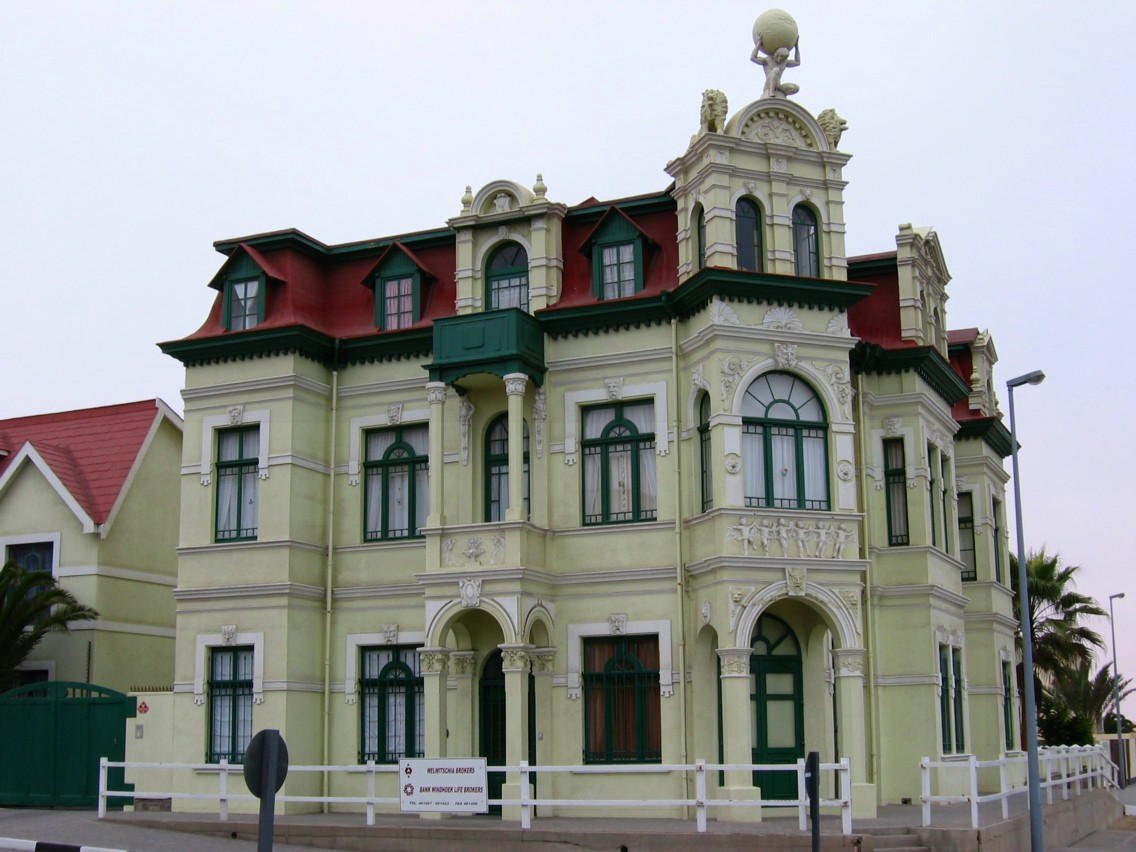
Hohenzollernhaus in Swakopmund

The first Germans in Namibia were missionaries, initially sent through the London Missionary Society and then later also the Rheinish Missionary Society. Both institutions worked closely together towards the end of the 18th century, as the Rheinish Missionary Society did not yet have any established facilities in Southern Africa. From 1805 the Albrecht brothers, followed by a number of other missionaries, settled in South West Africa. They engaged in cultural work, but also laid the groundwork for later colonisation.

Later traders arrived and after the landing of the ship Tilly in Lüderitz Bay in 1883, a rising number of German officials, settlers, workmen and soldiers. After South West Africa was officially declared a German colony in 1884, as well as receiving recognition by England, an increasing number of migrants arrived from Germany. This migration flow reached its high point during the first Lüderitz diamond discoveries.

Migration stagnated after the end of World War I, when Germany lost all sovereignty over its colonies in the Treaty of Versailles. The governance of South West Africa was transferred to South Africa by the League of Nations. During the subsequent 'South-Africanisation' of South West Africa, around half of the remaining 15,000 German residents were deported with their farms being handed over to South Africans. This so-called 'degermanisation' policy only changed after the London Agreement of 23 October 1923, according to which the remaining Germans were afforded British citizenship. German immigration as well as the spread of the German language were also expressively encouraged. In all, 3,200 Germans took up the opportunity of acquiring citizenship.

At the start of World War II, South Africa aligned itself to the United Kingdom by a slim majority, and on 6 September 1939 South Africa officially declared war on Germany and the Axis. In 1939 those in South West Africa of German origin were put under house or farm arrest and then in 1940 transferred to South Africa to be interned in camps, where they would remain until 1946. From 1942, their British citizenship, afforded to them in 1923, was revoked.

The Apartheid policy of South Africa came under increasing criticism and resulted in the founding and strengthening of the black resistance movement, including in South West Africa. At this time relations between the South African government and the German population were warming, leading to an increase in migration from Germany being viewed more favourably.

== Communities ==
Most of the current German Namibians are descendants of farmers, officials, craftsmen and relatives of the so-called Schutztruppe (protection troops) as well as descendants of the migration waves following both of the world wars. Since around 1980, an increase in tourism has led to a rise in ownership of holiday and retirement homes by Germans. Today many Germans in Namibia are small and medium entrepreneurs.

Many German-speakers live in the capital, Windhoek (German: Windhuk), and in smaller towns such as Swakopmund, Lüderitz and Otjiwarongo, where German architecture, too, is highly visible. Many German Namibians are prominent in business, farming, and tourism or as governmental officials. For example, the first post-independence mayor of Windhoek, Björn von Finckenstein, was a German Namibian. The interests of the community are frequently voiced through Africa's only German-language daily, Die Allgemeine Zeitung. The Goethe-Institut in Windhoek lobbies on behalf of the German community. The legacy of German colonisation in Namibia can also be seen in the Lutheran Church, which is the largest religious denomination in the country.

Many place names in Namibia carry names of German origin. The main road in the capital city, Windhoek, retained the name Kaiserstrasse ("Emperor Street") until Namibian independence in 1990.

== Culture ==
The SK Windhoek sports club and Namibia Breweries organized the first Windhoek Oktoberfest in 1958, which is styled after Oktoberfest in Munich and welcomed more than 5,500 visitors in 2026. Namibia is also home to carnival celebrations styled after those in Cologne and Mainz. The first Windhoek Karneval (WiKa) took place in 1953 and was organized by the Windhoek Carnival Society (German: Karnevalsgesellschaft Windhoek) and SK Windhoek. Celebrations have since expanded throughout the country to Swakopmund, Walvis Bay, Lüderitz, Tsumeb, Otjiwarongo, and Witvlei.

There is a relatively large body of German-Namibian literature. Thomas Keil divides the corpus into five categories: missionary literature, explorers' reports, colonial-era South West African literature, inter-war "Südwester" literature, and German-Namibian literature as German-language foreign literature. The development of this body of work has been facilitated, in part, by a large number of German-language publishing houses in Namibia, such as Gloria Verla, Klaus hess Verla, Kaiser Verla, Padlangs Verla, Melchior Verla, and the Namibiana Buchdepot. The German-language publishing industry and German-Namibian literature (especially of the "Südwester" variety) has been critifized as presenting a revisionist history of the colonial era. However, Sylvia Schlettwein has argued that a "new" German-Namibian literature that goes beyond the colonial past is emerging.

== Decline ==
The percentage of the population of Namibia formed by Germans has declined recently, spurring speculation that the overall number of German Namibians is decreasing. The decline in the percentage of German Namibians is mainly due to their low birth rates and the fact that other Namibian ethnic groups have higher birth rates and bigger families.

According to the 2001 Census, only 1.1% of all Namibian households use German as a home language (3,654 households), which is much less than that for Afrikaans (39,481 or 11.4%) or English (6,522 or 1.9%).

As per the 2011 census, 0.9% of all Namibian households used German as a home language (4,359 households), as compared to 10.4% using Afrikaans (48,238) and 3.4% using English (15,912). German is spoken by only 0.3% of the rural Namibians as compared to 1.7% of the urban Namibians. The maximum concentration can be found at Erongo (2.8%), Khomas (2.6%) and Otjozondjupa (1.4%).

== Education ==
Deutsche Höhere Privatschule Windhoek, a German international school, is in the country's capital, Windhoek.

== List of notable German Namibians ==
- Dieter Aschenborn (1915–2002), painter
- Uli Aschenborn (born 1947), South African-born Namibian animal painter
- Chris Badenhorst (born 1965), South West African-born former Springbok test rugby union player
- Beate Baumgartner (born 1983), Namibian-born Austrian singer
- Monica Dahl (born 1975), swimmer
- Klaus Dierks (1936–2005), government minister
- Till Drobisch (born 1993), road bicycle racer
- Kerstin Gressmann (born 1994), tennis player
- Otto Herrigel (1937–2013), lawyer, businessman, and politician
- Erik Hoffmann (born 1981), road bicycle racer
- Adolph Jentsch (1888–1977), South West African artist
- Friedrich Wilhelm Kegel (d. 1948), South West African businessman
- Ingeborg Körner (born 1929), South West African-born German actress
- Richard Kunzmann (born 1976), novelist
- Bradley Langenhoven (born 1983), rugby union player
- Jörg Lindemeier (born 1968), swimmer
- Anton Lubowski (1952–1989), South West African anti-apartheid activist
- Henning Melber (born 1950), political activist
- Oliver Risser (born 1980), footballer
- Wilko Risser (born 1982), Namibian-German footballer
- Friedhelm Sack (born 1956), sport shooter
- Wolfgang Schenck (1913–2010), South West African-born German World War II fighter ace
- Calle Schlettwein (born 1954), politician and former Minister of Agriculture, Water and Land Reform
- Bernard Scholtz (born 1990), cricketer
- Nicolaas Scholtz (born 1986), cricketer
- Phillip Seidler (born 1998), swimmer
- EES (Eric Sell, born 1983), rapper
- Hans Erik Staby (1935–2009), politician and architect
- Manfred Starke (born 1991), footballer
- Sandra Starke (born 1993), Namibian-born German footballer
- Gerhard Tötemeyer (born 1935), Namibian professor and former politician
- Raimar von Hase (born 1948), farmer and leader of the Namibia Agricultural Union
- Günther von Hundelshausen (born 1980), footballer
- Hellmut von Leipzig (1921–2016), Namibian-German World War II recipient of the Knight's Cross of the Iron Cross
- Anoeschka von Meck (born 1967), Afrikaans-language author
- Anton von Wietersheim (born 1951), politician

== See also ==
- Germany–Namibia relations
- Ethnic Germans
- German South West Africa
- Deutscher Pfadfinderbund Namibia
