= Waka Waka Moo =

Children's television program in Namibia

Waka Waka Moo is a children's television program in Namibia, which broadcasts on Namibian Broadcasting Corporation. Created by Namibian model Luis Munana, the show debuted in 2018 following three years of development. Munana related a story that he was babysitting his nephews, who were watching shows on Cartoon Network, Netflix, and Nickelodeon but was disappointed that they had no shows that showed their culture and heritage. This began a three-year development process, in which Munana worked with the Ministry of Education in Namibia as well as animators and others to bring the show together.

== Content ==
The show consists of animated segments as well as live-action puppeteering. It explores various topics, including subjects like basic mathematics and geography as well as region-specific topics like traditional folk tales, health and safety skills, and basic financial literacy. The show is translated into various local Namibian languages, including English, Afrikaans, Silozi, Rukwangali, Damara/Nama, Oshiwambo, Otjiherero, German and Setswana.

== Partnerships ==
In addition to the show's partnership with the Ministry of Education, the show has partnered with a variety of public and private sector organizations. The show partnered with Standard Chartered to host a Kids Choice Awards show in 2020. The show went on a tour of Namibia in support of early childhood education which was sponsored by the European Union and Interteam Swiss as well as several government ministries.
