= Deutsche Höhere Privatschule Windhoek =

Deutsche Höhere Privatschule
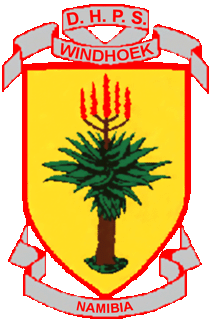

Location
- Windhoek; Khomas Region; Namibia
- Coordinates: 22.575°S 17.083°E

Information
- Type: Private
- Opened: 1909
- Principal: Jörg Przybilla
- Website: dhps-windhoek.de

The Deutsche Höhere Privatschule (DHPS) is a private school in Namibia and a German International School Abroad. It is situated in the capital Windhoek. The DHPS is funded by the German Federal Government as well as by school fees.

Scholars have the option of leaving with the Cambridge certificate, the common school-leaving certificate in Namibia, in grade 12, or doing the Deutsche Internationale Abiturprüfung (DIA, The German International Abitur), also in grade 12.

== History ==
The school was established in 1909 under the name Kaiserliche Realschule Windhuk (Windhoek Imperial Secondary School). Its name changed to Deutsche Realschule (German secondary school) upon the abdication of the German emperor Wilhelm II at the end of World War I. In 1926 the school introduced the Abitur and thus assumed the name Deutsche Oberrealschule (German senior secondary school). When the Abitur was replaced by the matric in 1941, the school was renamed Höhere Privatschule (lit. Higher private school), and it got its current name in 1958.

== Culture ==
DHPS offers kindergarten and pre-school, and primary and secondary grades from grade 1 to 12. Classes are split into a German and an English stream, depending on the language in which the majority of the subjects are taught.

With a mix of black and white students, teachers, and parents, the school has long grappled with accusations of discrimination, racism, and bullying. Henning Melber opined in 2020 that:

"[DHPS] reproduces significant features inherent in parts of the German-speaking minority [...] Their mindset points to white supremacy. The superiority complex is perpetuated more than a generation into independence. It is passed on to the offspring at home."

DHPS has boarding facilities, a school garden, and various sporting facilities, e.g. swimming pool, basketball courts, soccer fields, a beach volleyball field and a roller hockey rink. The school runs an annual bazaar with food stalls and entertainment.

== Alumni ==
- Henning Melber (political scientist and sociologist, matric 1970)
- Calle Schlettwein (member of cabinet, matric 1972)

== See also ==
- Germany–Namibia relations
- German language in Namibia
- German Namibians
