= German South West Africa =

Colony of the German Empire

Coordinates: 22°34′12″S 17°05′01″E

German South West Africa Protectorate Schutzgebiet Deutsch-Südwestafrika
- 1884–1915
- Service flag of the Colonial Office Coat of arms of the German Empire
- Anthem: "Heil dir im Siegerkranz" (German) (English: "'Hail to Thee in the Victor's Crown")
- Green: German South West Africa; Dark gray: Other German colonial possessions Darkest gray: German Empire (1911 borders)
- Status: Colony of Germany
- Capital: Windhuk
- Official languages: German
- Recognised regional languages: Afrikaans; Khoekhoegowab; Oshiwambo; Otjiherero; Setswana
- Ethnic groups: 99% Black African; 0.8% White; 0.2% other
- Religion: Christianity; Indigenous beliefs
- Government
- Governor
  - 1894–1905: Theodor von Leutwein
  - 1905–1907: Friedrich von Lindequist
  - 1907–1910: Bruno von Schuckmann
  - 1910–1919: Theodor Seitz
- Historical era: Scramble for Africa
  - Start of colonial occupation by the German Empire: 7 August 1884
  - Herero and Nama genocide: 1904–1908
  - Union of South Africa occupies German South West Africa: 9 July 1915
  - Treaty of Versailles: 28 June 1919

Area
- 1912: 835,100 km^{2} (322,400 sq mi)

Population
  - 1912: 250,000
- Currency: German South West African mark
Preceded by
Uukwambi
Uukwaluudhi
Uukwangali
Succeeded by
South West Africa
- Today part of: Namibia

German South West Africa (German: Deutsch-Südwestafrika) officially known as the German South West Africa Protectorate, was a colony of the German Empire from 1884 until 1915, when it was captured by the Western Allies during World War I. However, Germany did not officially cede this territory until the 1919 Treaty of Versailles.

German rule over this territory was punctuated by numerous rebellions by its native African peoples. German colonial forces conducted a campaign of reprisals from 1904 to 1908, now known as the Herero and Nama genocide.

The colony was captured by the Western Allies during World War I. Its administration was taken over by the Union of South Africa (a dominion within the British Empire) and administered as South West Africa under a League of Nations mandate. It became independent as Namibia on 21 March 1990.

== Early settlements ==
Initial European contact with the areas which would become German South West Africa came from traders and sailors, starting in January 1486 when Portuguese explorer Diogo Cão, possibly accompanied by Martin Behaim, landed at Cape Cross. However, for several centuries, European settlement would remain limited and temporary. In February 1805, the London Missionary Society established a small mission in Blydeverwacht, but the efforts of this group met with little success.

In 1840, the London Missionary Society transferred all of its activities to the German Rhenish Missionary Society. Some of its first representatives in this territory were Franz Heinrich Kleinschmidt (who arrived in October 1842) and Carl Hugo Hahn (who arrived in December 1842). They began founding churches throughout the territory. The Rhenish missionaries had a significant influence, initially on culture and dress of indigenous peoples and later on politics. During this same time period, merchants and farmers were establishing outposts in the territory.

== Early history ==
On 16 November 1882, a German merchant from Bremen, Adolf Lüderitz, requested protection from Chancellor Otto von Bismarck for a station that he planned to build in South West Africa. Once this was granted, his employee, Heinrich Vogelsang, purchased land from a native chief and established a settlement at Angra Pequena. It was later renamed Lüderitz after the merchant. On 24 April 1884, he placed the area under the protection of Imperial Germany to deter possible encroachment by other European powers. In early 1884, the British gunboat SMS Nautilus visited to review the situation. A favourable report from the government, and acquiescence from the British, resulted in a visit from the corvette Leipzig and the frigate Elisabeth. The German flag was finally raised in South West Africa on 7 August 1884; German claims were confirmed during the Conference of Berlin. In October, the newly appointed Commissioner for West Africa, Gustav Nachtigal, arrived on the gunboat Möwe.

In April 1885, the Deutsche Kolonialgesellschaft für Südwest-Afrika (German Colonial Society for Southwest Africa, known as DKGSWA) was founded with the support of German bankers (Gerson von Bleichröder, Adolph von Hansemann), industrialists (Count Guido Henckel von Donnersmarck) and politicians (Frankfurt mayor Johannes von Miquel). DKGSWA was granted monopoly rights to exploit mineral deposits, following Bismarck's policy that private rather than public money should be used to develop the colonies. The new Society soon bought the assets of Lüderitz's failing enterprises, land and mineral rights. Lüderitz drowned the next year while on an expedition to the mouth of the Orange River. Later, in 1908, diamonds were discovered. Diamonds were promoted as a major investment, along with gold, copper, platinum, and other minerals.

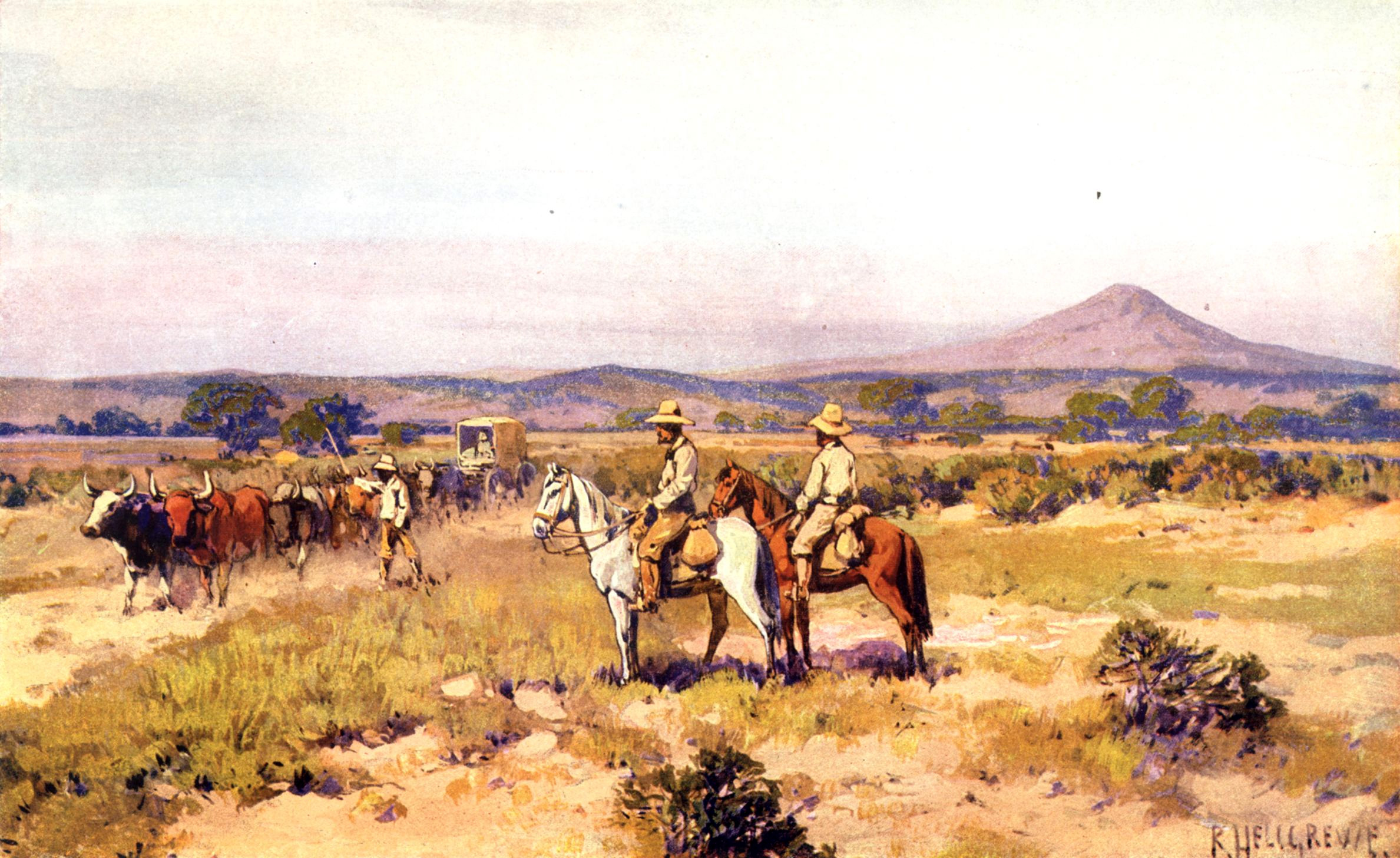
European settlers in German Southwest Africa, c. 1911

In May, Heinrich Ernst Göring was appointed Commissioner and established his administration at Otjimbingwe. On 17 April 1886, a law was passed that created the legal system of the colony, establishing a dual system with laws for Europeans and different laws for natives.

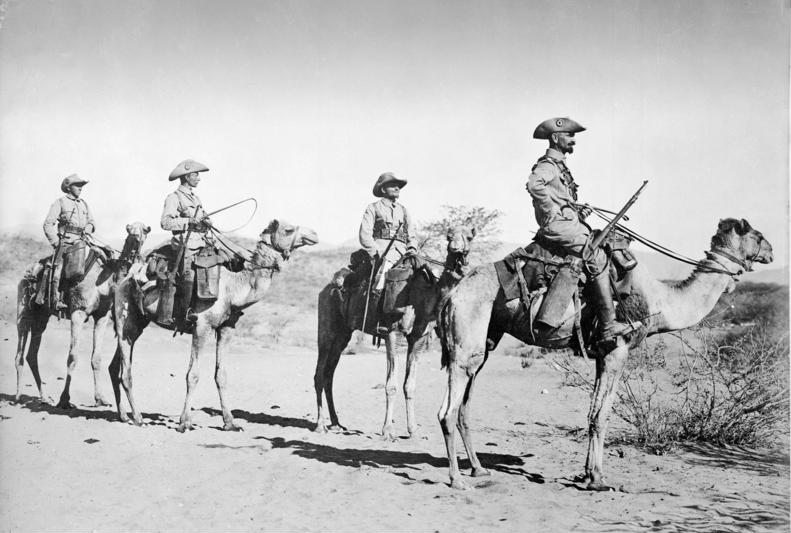
Four German soldiers in a Camel-Schutztruppe patrol, 1906

Over the following years, relations between the German settlers and the indigenous peoples worsened in reaction to the latter's loss of resources as they suffered segregation and discrimination. Additionally, the British settlement at Walvis Bay, a coastal enclave within South West Africa, continued to develop. Many British and German small farmers and missionaries moved into the region. A complex web of treaties, agreements, and vendettas increased the unrest. In 1888 the first group of Schutztruppen—colonial protectorate troops—arrived, sent to protect the military base at Otjimbingwe.

In 1890, the colony was declared a German Crown Colony, and more troops were sent. In July of the same year, as part of the Heligoland–Zanzibar Treaty between Britain and Germany, the colony grew in size through the acquisition of the Caprivi Strip in the northeast, promising new trade routes into the interior.

Almost simultaneously, between August and September 1892, the South West Africa Company Ltd (SWAC) was established by the German, British, and Cape Colony governments, aided by financiers to raise the capital required to enlarge mineral exploitation (specifically, the Damaraland concession's copper deposit interests).

A veterinary cordon fence was introduced in 1896 to control rinderpest by restricting population and livestock movement. Later known as the Red Line, it became a political boundary with police protection concentrated south of the line, while northern areas were controlled though indirect colonial rule using traditional authorities. This led to different political and economic outcomes, for example, between the northern Ovambo people compared to the more centrally located Herero people.

== Rebellion against German rule and genocide of the Herero and Nama ==
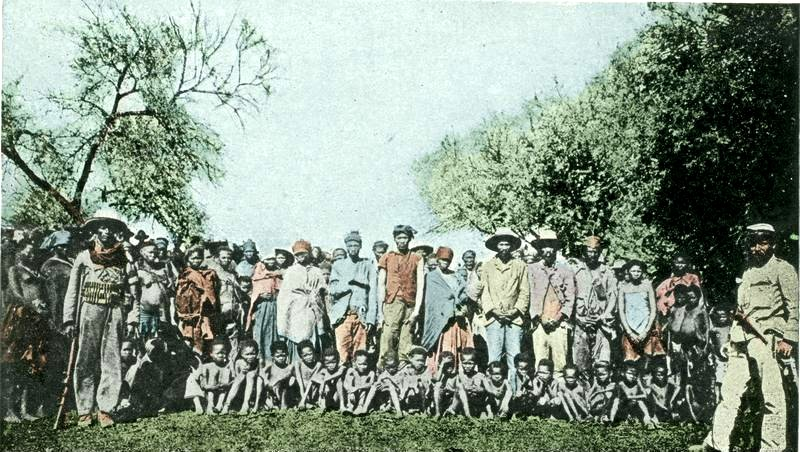
Nama POWs in 1900

Through 1893 and 1894, the first "Hottentot Uprising" of the Nama and their leader Hendrik Witbooi occurred. The following years saw many further local uprisings against German rule. Before the Herero and Nama genocide of 1904–1907, the Herero and Nama had good reasons to distrust the Germans, culminating in the Khaua-Mbandjeru rebellion. This rebellion, in which the Germans tried to control the Khaua by seizing their property under cover of European legal views of property ownership, was criticised at home for being no real reform of the notion of collective tribal ownership. This led to the largest of the rebellions, known as the Herero Wars (or Herero genocide) of 1904.

Remote farms were attacked, and approximately 150 German settlers were killed. The Schutztruppe of only 766 troops and native auxiliary forces was, at first, no match for the Herero. The Herero went on the offensive, sometimes surrounding Okahandja and Windhoek and destroying the railway bridge to Osona. An additional 14,000 troops, hastened from Germany under Lieutenant General Lothar von Trotha, crushed the rebellion in the Battle of Waterberg.

Earlier von Trotha issued an ultimatum to the Herero people, denying them the right of being German subjects and ordering them to leave the country or be killed. To escape, the Herero retreated into the waterless Omaheke region, a western arm of the Kalahari Desert, where many of them died of thirst. The German forces guarded every water source and were given orders to shoot any adult male Herero on sight. Only a few Herero managed to escape into neighbouring British Bechuanaland.

The German official military report on the campaign lauded the tactics:

This bold enterprise shows up in the most brilliant light the ruthless energy of the German command in pursuing their beaten enemy. No pains, no sacrifices were spared in eliminating the last remnants of enemy resistance. Like a wounded beast the enemy was tracked down from one water-hole to the next until finally, he became the victim of his own environment. The arid Omaheke [desert] was to complete what the German army had begun: the extermination of the Herero nation.

— Bley, 1971: 162

In late 1904, the Nama entered the struggles against the colonial power under their leaders Hendrik Witbooi and Jakobus Morenga, the latter often referred to as "the black Napoleon", despite losing most of his battles. This uprising was finally quashed during 1907–1908. In total, between 25,000 and 100,000 Herero, more than 10,000 Nama and 1,749 Germans died in the conflict.

After the official end of the conflict, the remaining natives, when finally released from detention, were subject to a policy of dispossession, deportation, forced labour, and racial segregation and discrimination in a system that in many ways anticipated apartheid. The genocide remains relevant to ethnic identity in independent Namibia and to relations with Germany.

The neighbouring British objected to what they regarded as the inhumane German policy. This involved maintaining a number of concentration camps in the colony during their war against the Herero and Nama peoples. Besides these camps, the indigenous people were interned in other places. These included private businesses and government projects, ships offshore, Etappenkommando in charge of supplies of prisoners to companies, private persons, etc., as well as any other materials. Concentration camps implies poor sanitation and a population density that would imply disease. Prisoners were used as slave labourers in mines and railways, for use by the military or settlers.

The Herero and Nama genocide has been recognised by the United Nations and by the Federal Republic of Germany. On the 100th anniversary of the camp's foundation, German Minister for Economic Development and Cooperation Heidemarie Wieczorek-Zeul commemorated the dead on-site and apologised for the camp on behalf of Germany. In May 2021, after five years of negotiations, the German government—recognising the Hottentot Rebellion as a colonial genocide—set up a $1.3 billion compensation fund.

=== Gallery ===
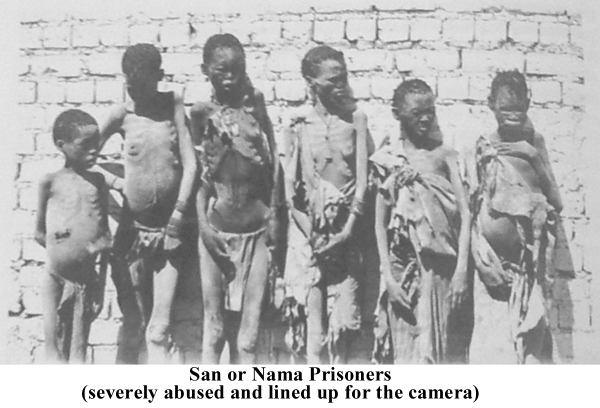

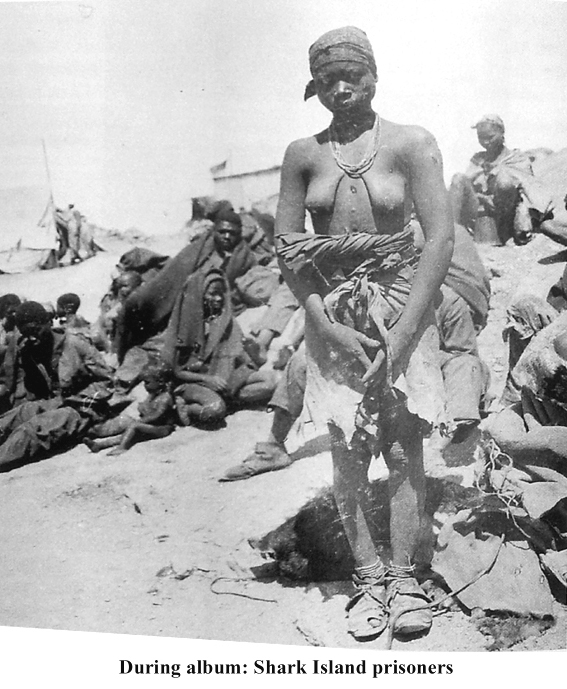

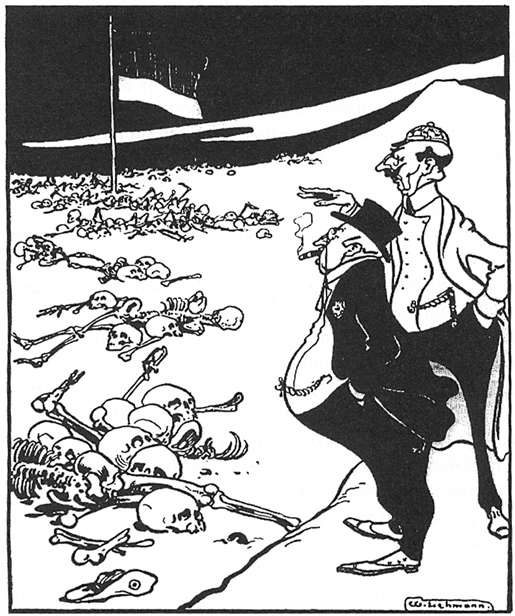

== First World War ==
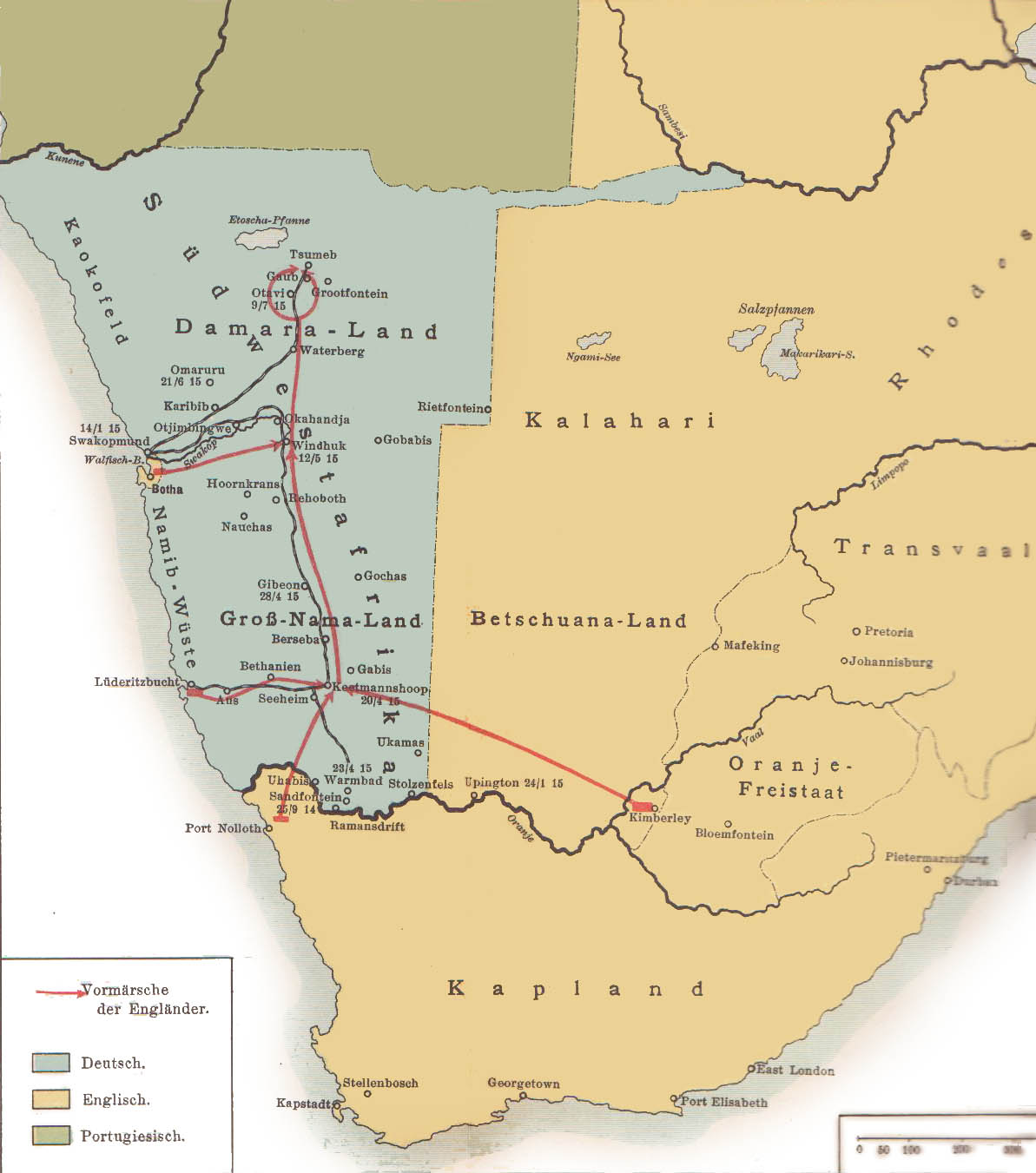
Map of the 1915 South West Africa campaign

The news about the start of World War I reached German South West Africa on 2 August 1914 via radio telegraphy. The information was transmitted from the Nauen transmitter station via a relay station in Kamina and Lomé in Togoland to the radio station in Windhoek.

After the start of the war, South African troops opened hostilities with an assault on the Ramansdrift police station on 13 September 1914. German settlers were transported to concentration camps near Pretoria and later in Pietermaritzburg. Because of the overwhelming numerical superiority of the South African troops, the German Schutztruppe, along with groups of Afrikaner volunteers fighting in the Maritz rebellion on the German side, offered opposition only as a delaying tactic. On 9 July 1915, Victor Franke, the last commander of the Schutztruppe, capitulated near Khorab.

Two members of the Schutztruppe, geography professors Fritz Jaeger and Leo Waibel, are remembered for their explorations of the northern part of German South West Africa, which became the book Contributions to the Geography of South West Africa (Beiträge zur Landeskunde von Südwestafrika).

== Postwar ==
After the war, the territory came under the control of Britain which was then formalized through a South African League of Nations mandate which made Union of South Africa responsible for administration. The territory eventually became subject to apartheid under South African rule, as well as becoming involved in the Angolan civil war in 1975. In 1990, the former colony became independent as Namibia, governed by the former liberation movement SWAPO.

== German legacy ==
Many German names, buildings, and businesses still exist in the country, and about 30,000 people of German descent still live there. German is still widely used in Namibia, with the Namibian Broadcasting Corporation operating a German-language radio station and broadcasting television news bulletins in German, while the daily newspaper Allgemeine Zeitung, founded in 1916, remains in publication. Deukom, a satellite television service, offers television and radio channels from Germany.

In addition, Lutheranism is the predominant Christian denomination in present-day Namibia.

== Population and demographics ==
German South West Africa was the only German colony in which Germans settled in large numbers. German settlers were drawn to the colony by economic possibilities in mining, and especially farming. In 1884 German South West Africa had a population of 200,000 people of which 3,643 were white and 84% of the white colonists were German (there was 3,048 Germans in 1884). By 1913 there was 213,000 people in total in the colony of which 14,830 were white and most of the white colonists (12,292 or 83% of the white colonists) were German. Most of the white colonists were white males.

Many of the Bantu and Herero which lived in the colony fled after the Herero Wars to neighboring areas outside the control of the Germans or died during it. With many natives fleeing the territory because of the Herero War, a labor source for the Germans was lost leading to labor shortages with subsequent attempts to import labor failing. Although the Herero Wars were costly to the Germans, a number of soldiers would stay in the colony and ended up becoming settlers.

Afrikaners would move to the colony, a process welcomed by the colonial government but opposed by national government, though both would eventually come to embrace it. The Germans sought to integrate the Afrikaners into the German population of the territory.

White settler population by year
Year	Total
1891	498
1892	622
1893	558
1894	969
1895	1,732
1896	1,992
1897	2,628
1898	2,499
1899	2,827
1900	3,339
1901	3,607
1902	4,635
1903	4,640
1904	NA
1905	NA
1906	6,366
1907	7,110
1908	8,213
1909	11,791
1910	12,935
1911	13,962
1912	14,816
1913	14,830

=== Racial segregation ===
In German South West Africa racial segregation was practiced in a variety of means. Bans were practiced on mixed-race marriages starting in 1905 along with revoking citizenship to mixed-race people in the colony also in 1905. Racial segregation was also practiced in the form of "native reservations" which were meant exclusively for natives in the territory and native Africans were not allowed to live in areas designated for white people and services were also segregated as well. Even hospitals were segregated. Natives were forced to carry identity documents and passports along with being expected to work; not working was a punishable offense.

=== Education ===
A network of schools were created in the territory to serve the population. Education was seen as a way to not only educate the population but integrate them and teach them desired values. For primary and secondary schools which were meant for whites, German was taught while at the mission schools which were intended for the native Africans they were taught in their own native languages but more advanced students could learn German.

The first government-ran school was established in 1894 in Windhoek for white children only and was a primary school which lasted until 1898 due to a lack of students. It was reopened in 1900 but this time it was free to attend. After the school was reopened in 1900 a number of government primary schools were opened throughout the colony in the following years. In 1909 the first secondary school was opened in Windhoek. Compulsory education was introduced in 1906 for all white children between 6 and 14 years old who lived within 4 kilometres (2.5 mi) of any town to attend a public school.

Students at secondary schools were taught a similar curriculum that was taught in Germany but no official textbooks meant for the colony were published until 1913. Although instruction was taught in German at schools meant for whites, French-language classes were introduced starting in 1914.

== Economy ==
In German South West Africa, attempts were made to establish farming in the territory. The arid climate hindered farming in the area and the Germans planned on building canals to counteract this. The number of farms tripled following the war.

Germany would build a railroad network in the colony using forced labor from Herero and Nama. The railroad allowed for the German colonial presence to expand with protection being guaranteed to those who lived within 100 kilometers of the railroad and allowed for the journey to reach other places much easier instead of using oxen. The first railroad built in the colony went from Windhoek to Swakopmund and opened in 1902. Over 2,100 kilometers of railways were built by the Germans; with stations being built alongside them whether it be for towns or simple refueling purposes. One of the major means of transport in the colony was with mules and in 1913 there were 5,000 of them.

=== Media ===
German South West Africa had several newspapers prior to 1914 which were meant for the white population. None of them appeared daily. The Lüderitzbuchter Zeitung, founded in 1909, was favorable to the diamond industry while the Windhuker Anzeiger, from 1901 published as Deutsch-Südwestafrikanische Zeitung (DSWAZ) was centered around promoting self-governance among the settlers. Newspapers in the German colonies could be suspended if they were negative toward the German authorities with one example being during the Herero War the DSWAZ was banned due to its negative positions toward the government.

== German placenames ==
Most place names in German South West Africa continued to bear German spellings of the local names, as well as German translations of some local phrases. The few exceptions to the rule included places founded by the Rhenish Missionary Society, generally biblical names, as well as:

- Hoornkrans
- Sandfontein
- Stolzenfels
- Waterberg (Otjiwarongo)

== Planned symbols for German South West Africa ==
In 1914, a series of drafts were made for proposed Coat of Arms and Flags for the German Colonies. However, World War I broke out before the designs were finished and implemented and the symbols were never actually taken into use. Following the defeat in the war, Germany lost all its colonies and the prepared coat of arms and flags were therefore never used.

Proposed flag

Proposed coat of arms

== See also ==
- History of Germany
- History of Namibia
- Germany–Namibia relations
- List of colonial governors of South West Africa
- List of former German colonies
- Postage stamps and postal history of German South West Africa
- Germans of Namibia
- Kamerun
- Togoland
- German East Africa
- German African Party
