= Namibian Black German =

German-based pidgin of Namibia

- Namibian Kiche Duits
- Kiche Duits
- Native to: Namibia
- Ethnicity: Black Namibians, generally Herero and Nama
- Native speakers: None (only learned as a second language), possibly with some minor transmission to youth
- Language family: German-based creole

Language codes
- ISO 639-3: None (mis)
- Glottolog: None

Namibian Black German, also NBG, (German: Küchendeutsch, lit. "kitchen German") is a pidgin language of Namibia that derives from standard German. It is nearly extinct. It was spoken mostly by Namibians who did not learn standard German during the German Empire's rule over German South West Africa from 1884 until 1915. It was never a first language. It is currently spoken as a second language by people generally over 50 years old, who today usually also speak Standard or Namibian German, Afrikaans, or English. Along with general learning in the metropolitan environments of Southern Namibia, where Namibian German is spoken, NBG may be preserved nominally through parent-to-child or in-house transmission.

== History ==
Colonial acquisition of German in Namibia often took place outside of formal education and was primarily self-taught. Like many pidgin languages, Namibian Black German developed through limited access to the standard language and was restricted to the work environment.

Currently several thousand Namibians speak German as a second language – many, but not most of them Black – and while Namibian German often does not adhere to standard German, it is not pidgin.

== Prepositions ==
English and Afrikaans have left an influence on the development of NBG, leading to three primary prepositional patterns:

- adding a preposition where Standard German would use the accusative
- dropping prepositions which are usually present in Standard German
- changing the preposition that is required by the verb

== Examples ==
Examples of phrases with Standard German equivalents:

- Lange nicht sehen - long no see ("Lange nicht gesehen")
- Was Banane kosten? - How much does the banana cost? ("Was kostet die/eine Banane?")
- spät Uhr - 'late hour', meaning 'it's late' ("es ist spät")
- Herr fahren Jagd, nicht Haus - "Master went hunting and he's not at home" ("Der Herr ist zur Jagd gefahren und ist nicht zu Hause")
