= German South West African mark =

1885–1915 currency of German South West Africa

The mark was the currency of German South West Africa between 1885 and 1915. Until 1914, the German mark circulated. Within days of the outbreak of the First World War, an issue of paper money titled Deutsch-Südwestafrikanische Mark was authorized in denominations of 5, 10, 20, 50 and 100 marks.

== History ==
From 1884 to 1901, the main currency of German South West Africa was the British pound sterling. However, in 1885, the German South West African mark began to be circulated. In 1893, the conversion rate of £1 for every 20ℳ was established. The gold content of the British pound sterling was 7.3224 grams, while the gold content of 20 marks was 7.168 grams. According to Gresham's law, "bad money drives out good", so the "bad" mark replaced the "good" British pound sterling. In 1901, the German mark became the official currency of German South West Africa, hence replacing the 20- and 5-mark denominations of the German South West African mark, for which they were also demonetized (although, they continued use in the metropolis of German South West Africa until 1907). In 1923, the coins of the German South West African mark were demonetized also. At the beginning of the First World War, it was decided to produce cash-coupon banknotes thereafter; this occurred until the occupation by South Africa in 1915 officially replaced the mark with the pound. The Windhoek Chamber of Commerce issued Gutscheine (vouchers) denominated in pfennig and mark between 1916 and 1918.

== Banknotes in 1914 ==
When after the beginning of the First World War when the cash-coupon banknotes began to be used, were denominated into five denominations, of 5, 10, 20, 50, and 100 marks.

== Sources ==
- Banknotes of German South West Africa
