= Radio stations in German South West Africa =

Fixed radio stations in German South West Africa

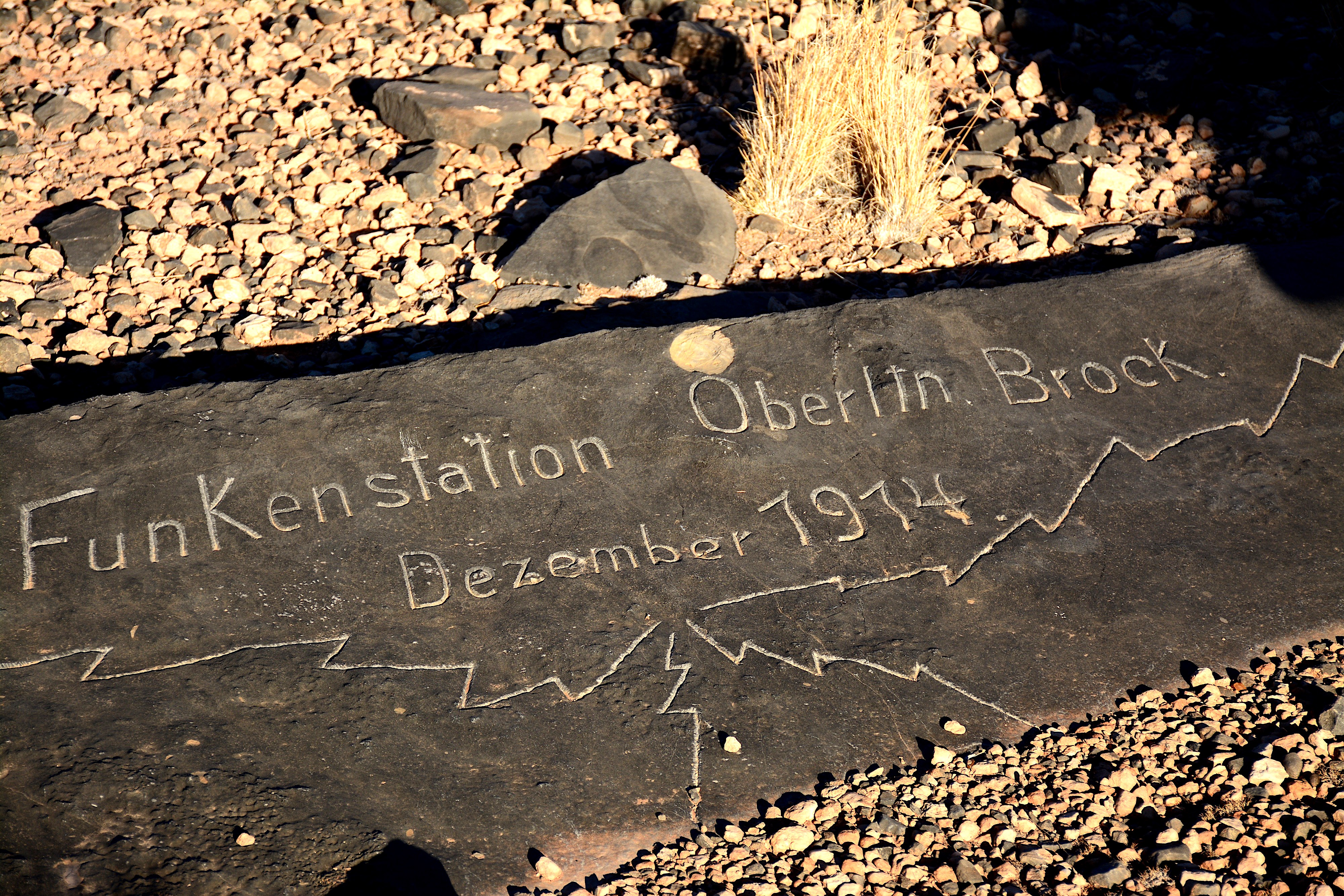
Memorial stone created by lieutenant Brock to remember the "Funkenstation" (radio station) on Farm Aar near Aus

A series of radio stations in German South West Africa (today Namibia) enabled the Germans to communicate between their colony, German South West Africa, and their motherland, the German Empire. They also used radio to communicate within the German South West Africa territory and with German boats at sea. The stations utilized spark-gap transmitters.

The introduction of wireless telegraphy was a significant step for communication between German South West Africa and the German motherland in Europe. The news about the start of World War I reached German South West Africa on 2 August 1914 via radio telegraphy. The information was transmitted from the Nauen transmitter station via a relay station in Kamina and Lomé in Togo to the radio station in Windhoek.

== Fixed radio stations ==
The Germans installed three fixed radio stations: one in the capital Windhoek, one in Swakopmund and one in Lüderitzbucht (now Lüderitz). During World War I, the radio station in Swakopmund was moved to Tsumeb, and the station in Lüderitzbucht was moved to Aus.

The radio stations were operated on a wave lengths ranging from 300 to 4500 meters corresponding to medium wave and longwave frequencies. At that time, shortwaves—higher frequencies above 3 MHz—could not yet be created. Therefore, the T-formed antennas of the radio stations were rather high; for instance, the towers in Windhoek were 120 metres (390 ft) tall.

The British government was well aware of the installation of the new German radio system. On 24 December 1913, the British consul in Lüderitzbucht reported to the Foreign Office the following:

Sir, I have the honour to inform you that a wireless telegraphy station is in course of erection in Windhuk. The station is designed to establish direct communication with Nauen in Germany and it is expected that the new service will be in full working order by the 15th May 1914

— British Consul in Lüderitzbucht

The radio station in Swakopmund was inaugurated on 4 February 1912 but then was dismantled on 13 August 1914 and moved to Tsumeb, where the station with its 86-metre (282 ft) towers was operational on 24 November 1914.

The radio station in Lüderitzbucht went into operation on 3 June 1912; it was dismantled on 8 August 1914 and moved to the small city of Aus, where it became operational on 15 September. By 19 September, South African troops had occupied the city of Lüderitzbucht.

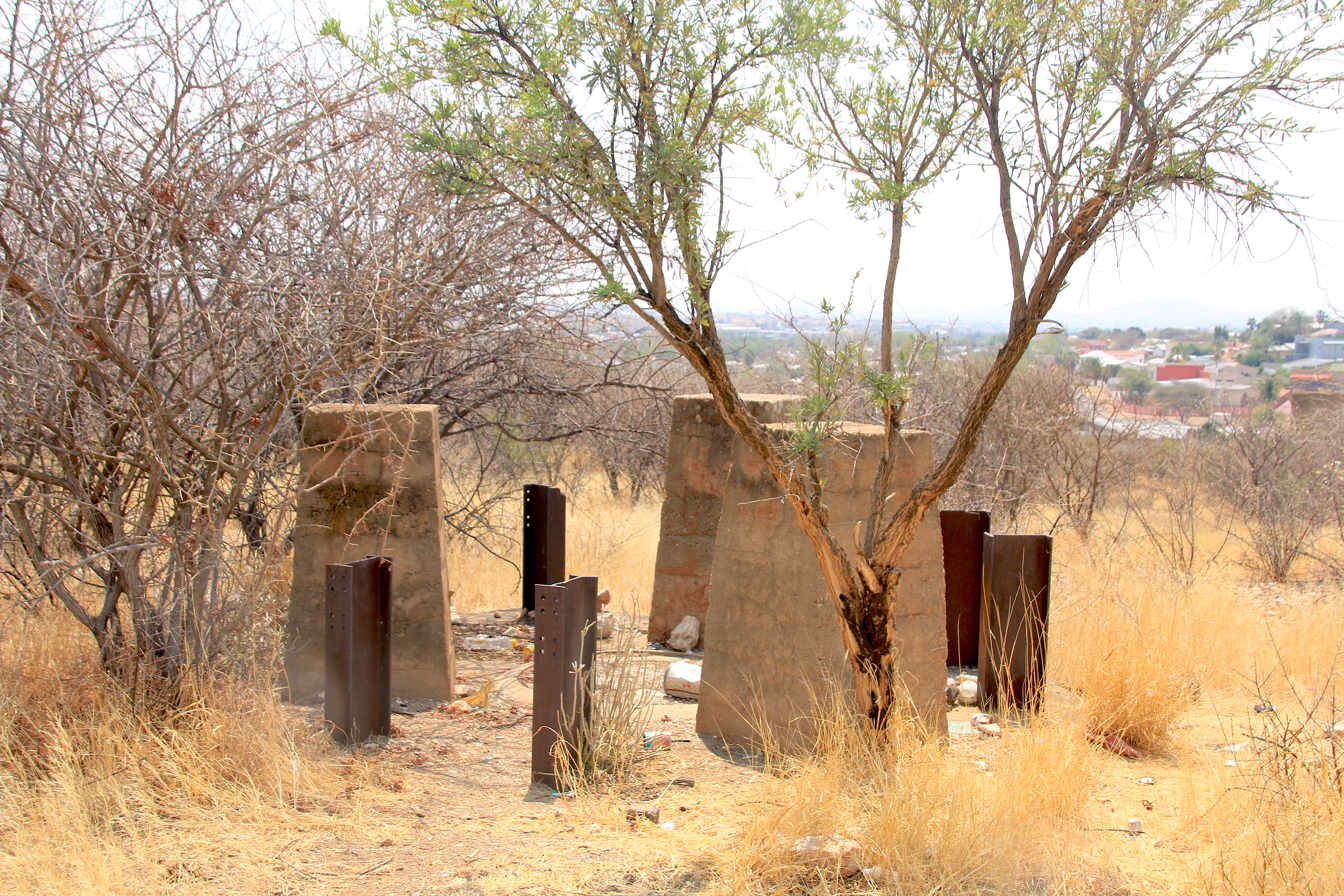
Base of radio tower in Windhoek
(2022 still visible)

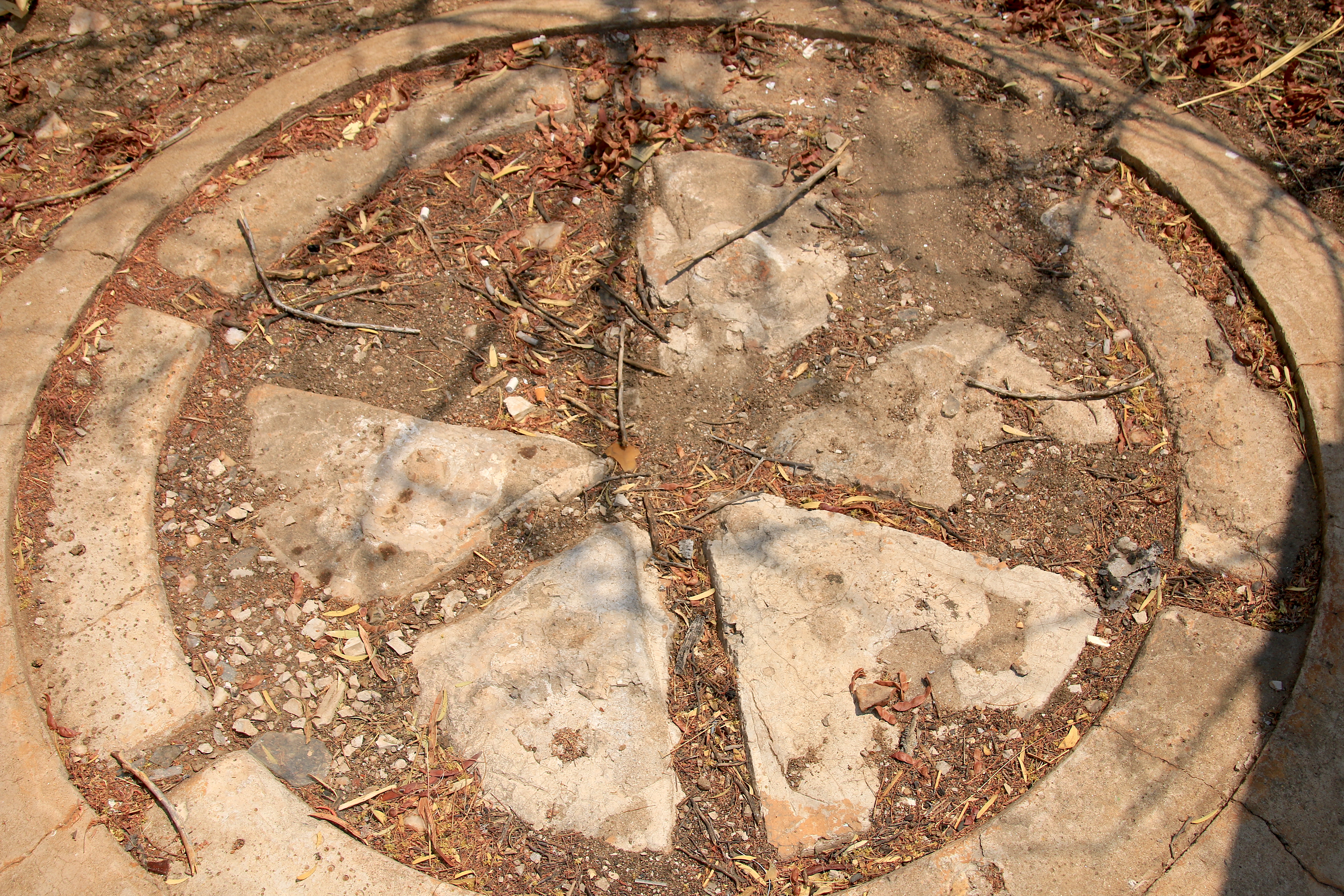
Foundation of radio tower in Windhoek
(2022 still visible)

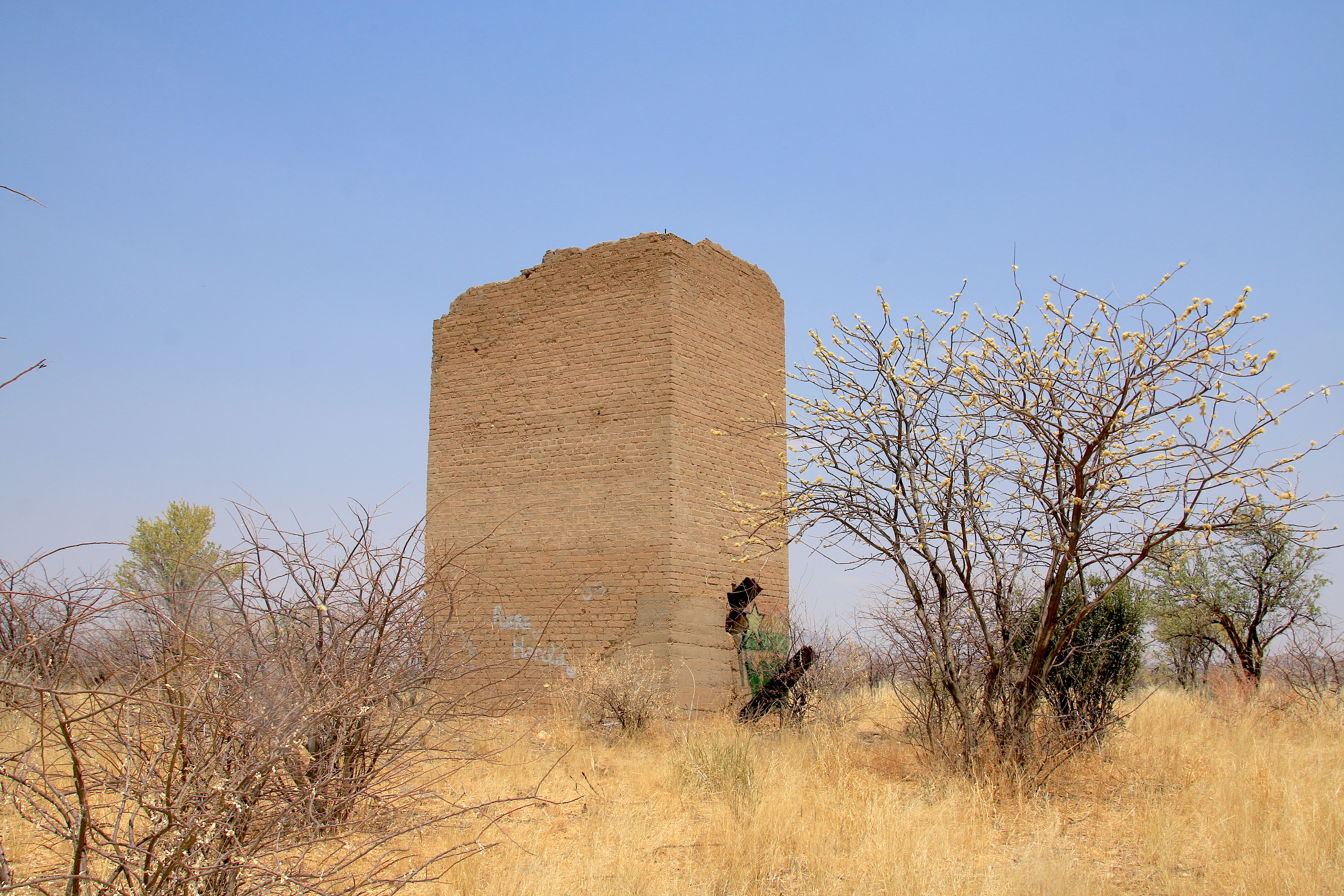
Anchor point of radiotower in Windhoek
(2022 still visible)

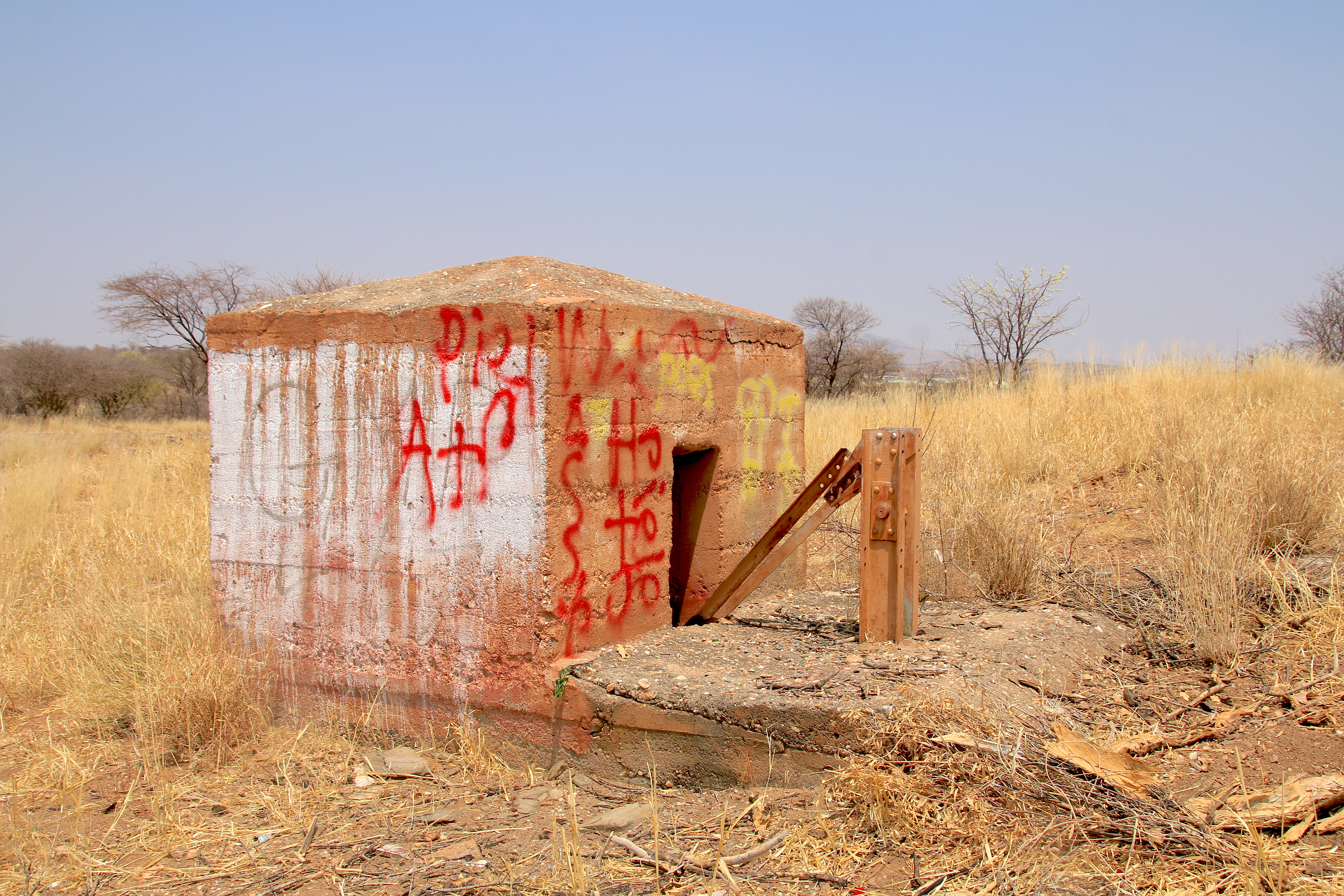
Anchor point of radiotower in Windhoek
(2022 still visible)

== Mobile radio stations ==
In 1903/1904, the Germans already had three operational mobile radio stations in German South West Africa for their communication in the territory. They used radios from Siemens & Halske and from Telefunken. The radios were installed on ox-wagons and were operated on two frequencies, on a wave length of 350 m and 875 m, respectively. The antennas were lifted by hydrogen balloons; the hydrogen was produced in Bitterfeld, Germany.

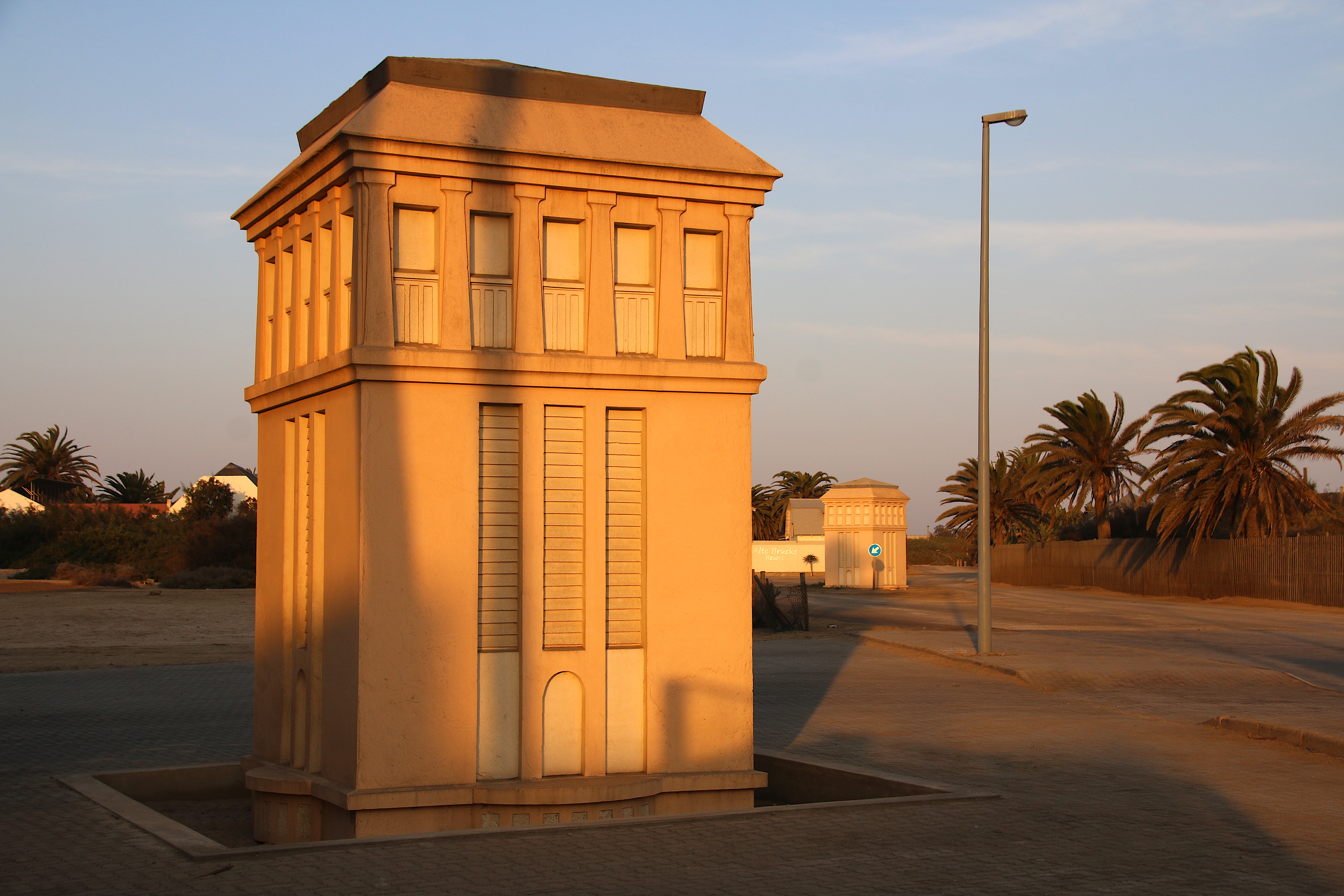
Two of three former anchor towers in Swakopmund

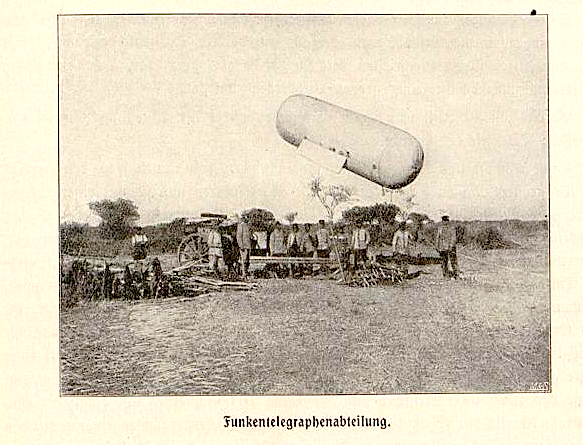
Mobile radio station in German South West Africa, using a hydrogen balloon to lift the antenna

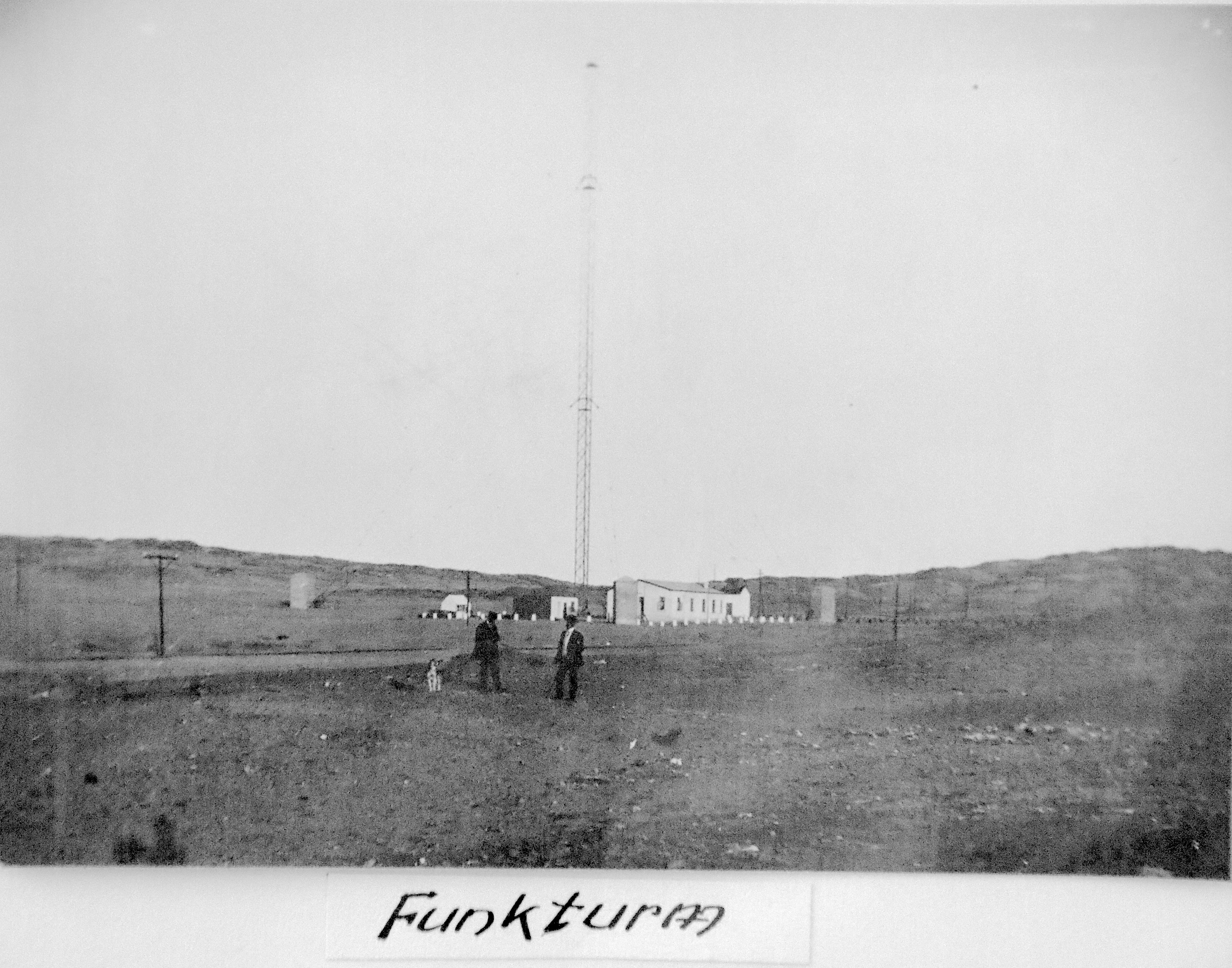
Radiotower in Lüderitz (1912)
