= Languages of Namibia =

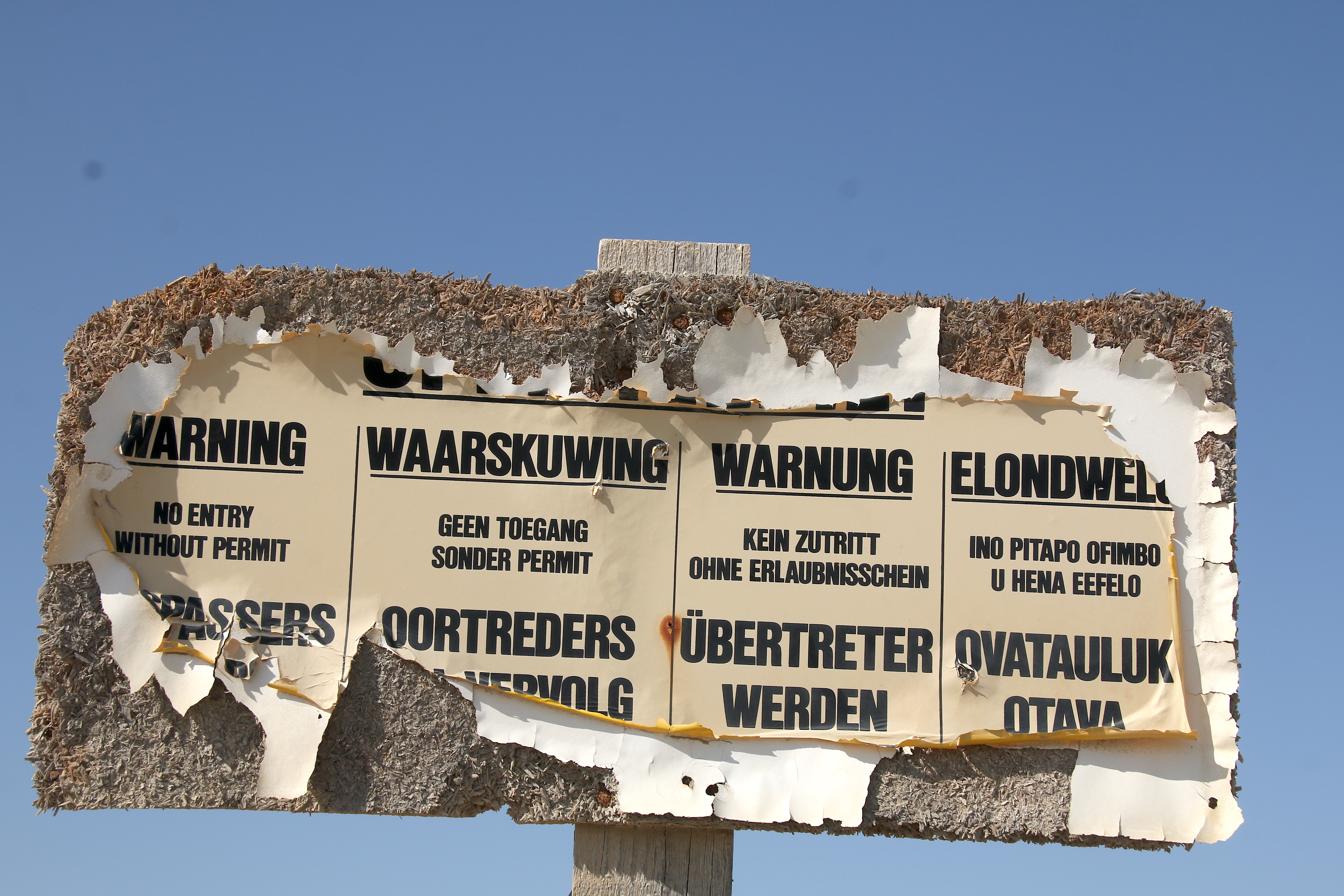
- Sign in Namibia in English, Afrikaans, German and Oshiwambo
- Official: English
- National: Afrikaans, German, Otjiherero, Khoekhoegowab, Oshiwambo, RuKwangali, Setswana, SiLozi
- Recognised: !Kung, Gciriku, Thimbukushu
- Vernacular: Namlish, Namibian Afrikaans, Namibian German
- Minority: Fwe, Kuhane, Mbukushu, Yeyi, Naro, ǃXóõ ǂKxʼauǁʼein
- Immigrant: Portuguese
- Signed: Namibian Sign Language
- Keyboard layout: QWERTY

Namibia, despite its sparse population, is home to a wide diversity of languages, from multiple language families: Germanic, Bantu, and the various Khoisan families. Afrikaans, German, and English had equal status as official languages during the time Namibia was administered by South Africa. Upon Namibian independence in 1990, English was enshrined as the nation's sole official language in the constitution of Namibia. German and Afrikaans were stigmatised as relics of the colonial past, while the rising of Mandela's Youth League and the 1951 Defiance Campaign spread English among the masses as the language of the campaign against apartheid.

== Language demographics ==
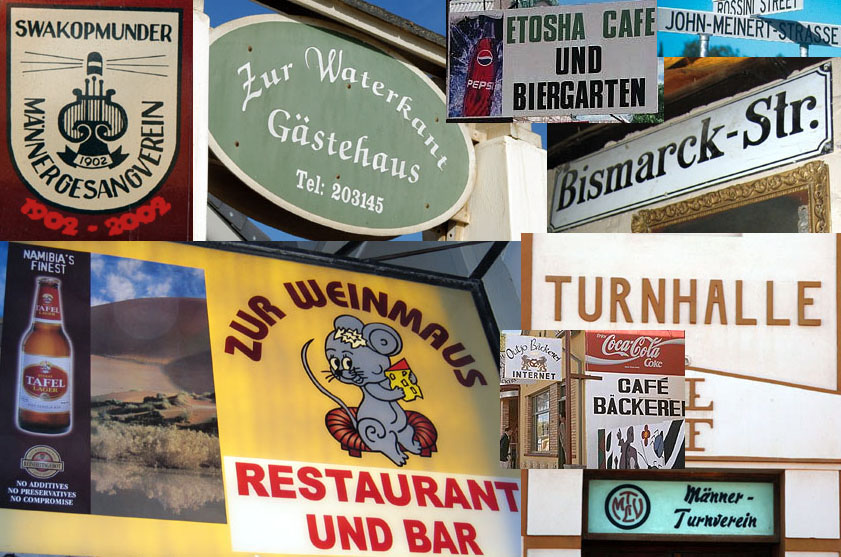
Stores, street names, signs, newspapers in German

The most widely spoken languages are Oshiwambo dialects by 49% of households in the country, then Khoekhoegowab by 11%; Afrikaans by 10%; RuKwangali by 9%; Otjiherero by 9%, and Silozi by 4.71%. Other languages include the Bantu languages Setswana, Gciriku, Fwe, Kuhane, Mbukushu, Yeyi; and the Khoisan Naro, ǃXóõ, Kung-Ekoka, ǂKxʼauǁʼein and Kxoe.

English, the sole official language, is spoken by 3.4% of people as their native language.

As of 2014 Portuguese was spoken by 4–5% of the total population, made up mostly of the Angolan community. Although the number of Angolans in Namibia declined from 2014 to 2015, affected by the neighbouring country's economic crisis, there are still around 100,000 Portuguese speakers in Namibia as of 2024, equivalent to 3.3% of the country's population. The language is now offered as an optional subject in many schools throughout the country.

Indigenous languages are included in the school syllabus at primary level. From secondary level English is the medium of instruction. English is the main lingua franca in the north and Afrikaans (Namibian Afrikaans) in the south. English and Afrikaans are both widely spoken in Windhoek.

Distribution of Khoekhoegowab

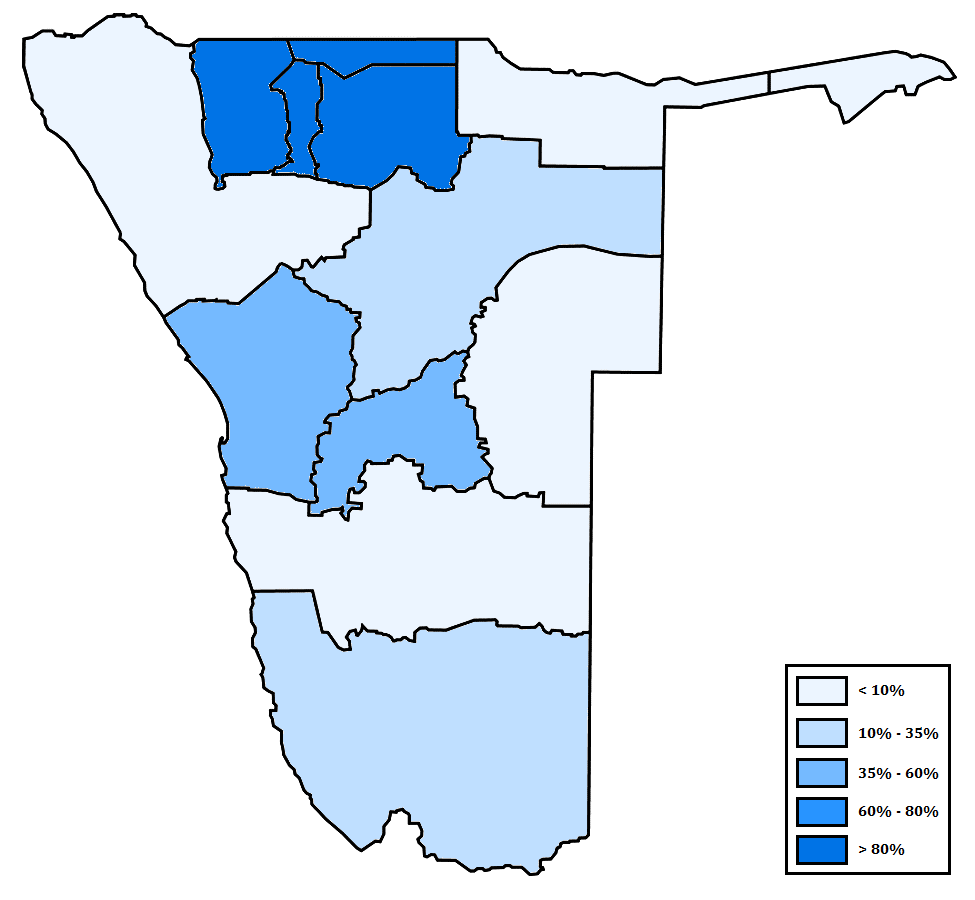
Distribution of Oshiwambo

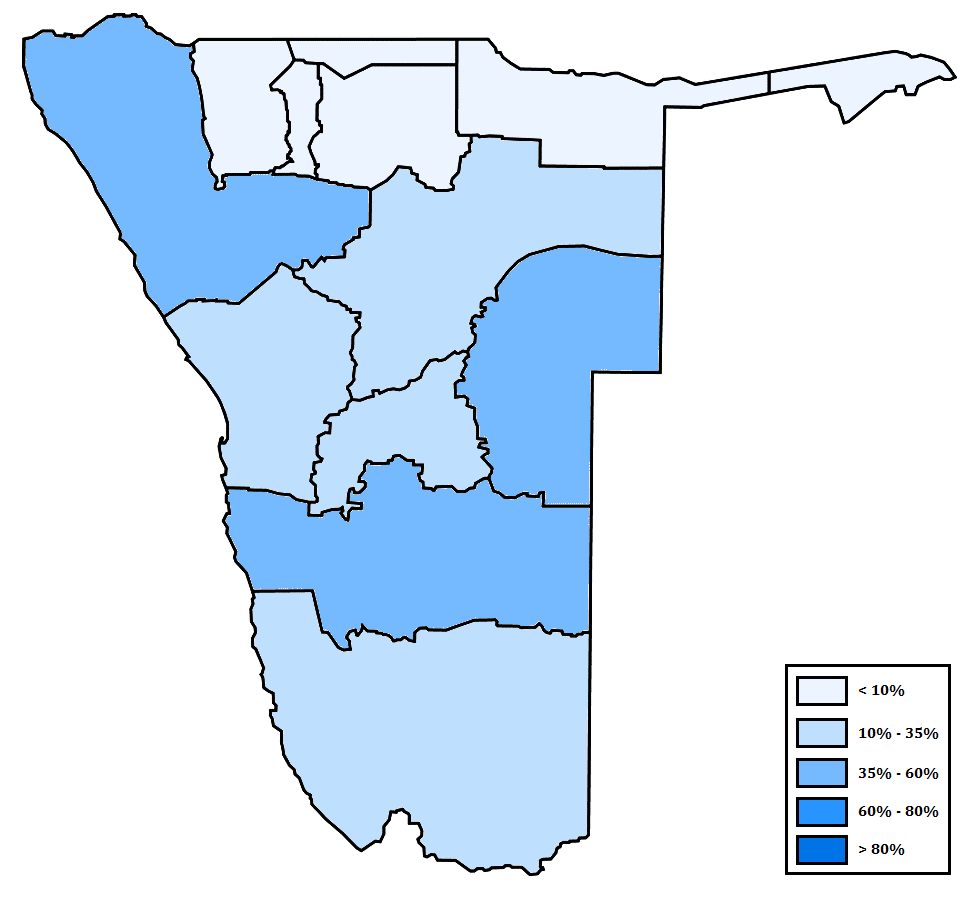
Distribution of Khoekhoegowab

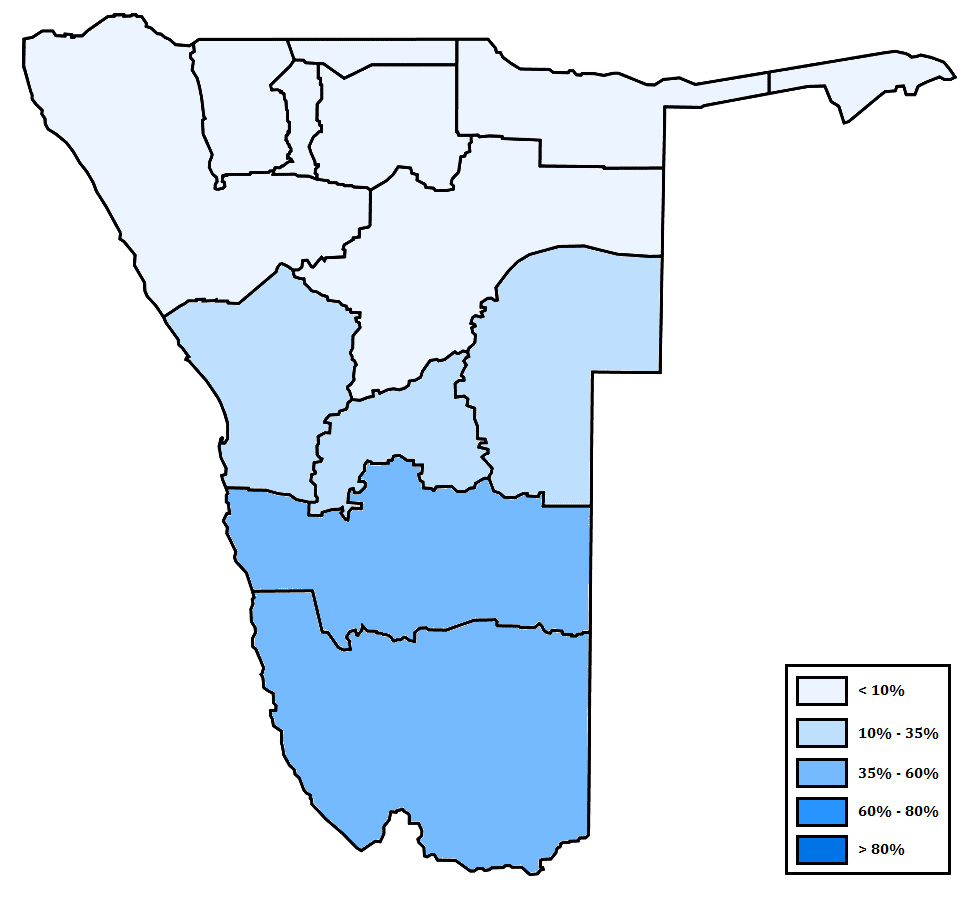
Distribution of Namibian Afrikaans
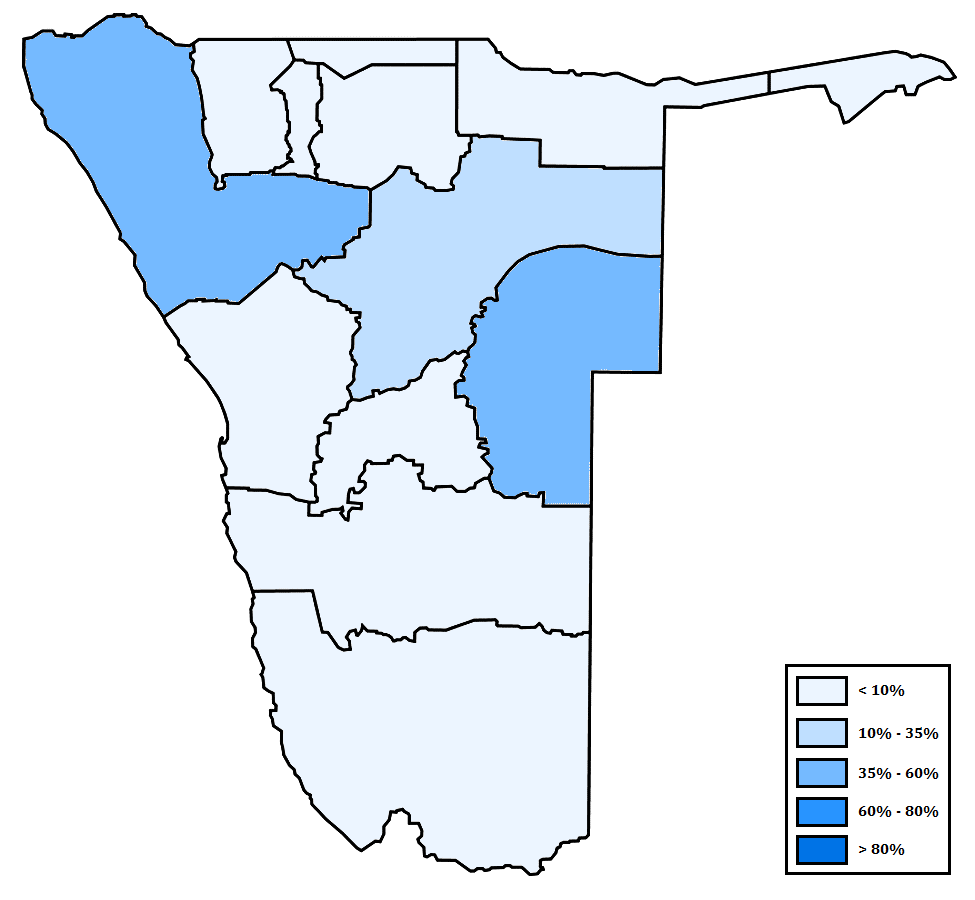
Distribution of Otjiherero

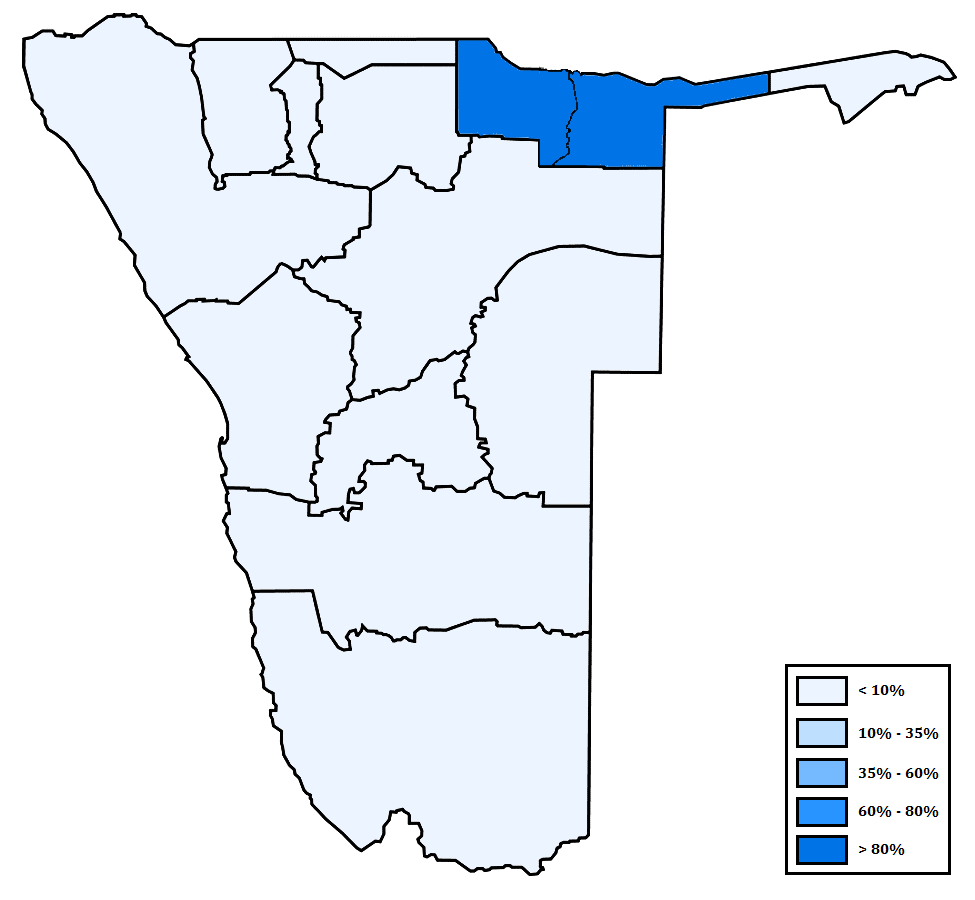
Distribution of Kavango languages

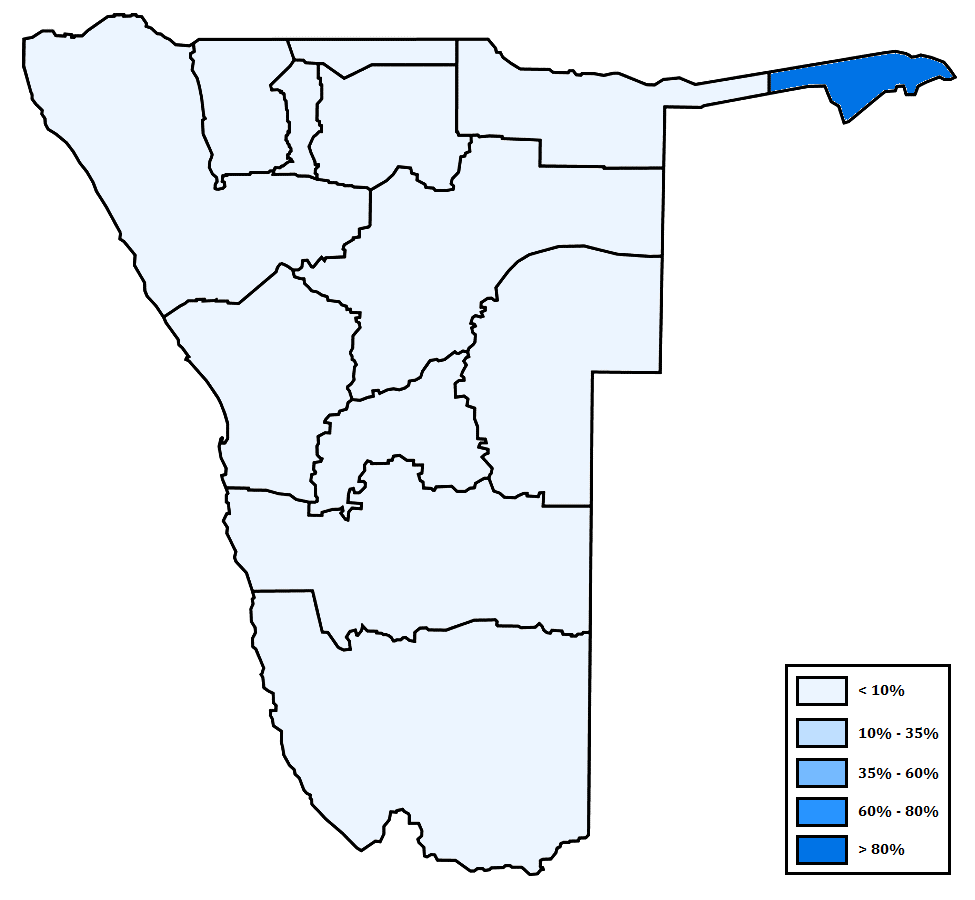
Distribution of Silozi

== Languages most often spoken in Namibian households ==
Main language	2001	2011
Oshiwambo	48.5	48.9
Khoekhoegowab	11.5	11.3
Afrikaans	11.4	10.4
Otjiherero	7.9	8.6
RuKwangali	9.7	8.5
Silozi	5.0	4.8
English	1.9	3.4
German	1.1	0.9
San	1.2	0.8
Other	1.8	2.4

Source: 2001 Census and 2011 Census

== See also ==
- Namibian Sign Language
- German language in Namibia
