= German language in Namibia =

Namibian German
- Südwesterdeutsch
- Namsläng
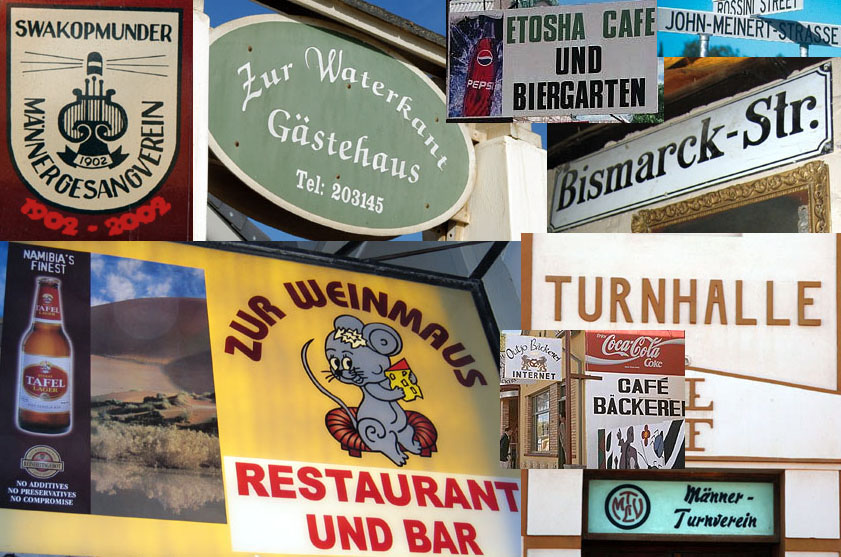
- Examples of German language on signs in Namibia
- Native to: Namibia
- Language family: Indo-European: Germanic; West Germanic; High German; Namibian German

Official status
- Recognised minority language in: Namibia

Language codes
- ISO 639-3: –
- Glottolog: None

Namibia is a multilingual country in which German is recognised as a national language. It is the only African nation to do so. While English has been the sole official language of the country since 1990, in many areas of the country, German enjoys official status at a community level. A national variety of German is also known as Namdeutsch.

German is especially widely used in central and southern Namibia and was until 1990 one of three official languages in what was then South West Africa, alongside Afrikaans and English, two other Germanic languages in Namibia. German is the mother tongue of German Namibians as well as Black Namibians raised in East Germany (the German Democratic Republic) during the last decades of the Cold War. Namibian Black German is a pidgin variety of Namibian German that is reported as nearly extinct as of 2017.

The German Namibian newspaper Allgemeine Zeitung on its website refers to 22,000 native speakers and of several hundred thousand who know German as a second or third language. German benefits from its similarity to Afrikaans and has a prominent position in the tourism and business sectors. Many Namibian natural features, places and streets have German names. However, Germanic linguist Ulrich Ammon sees the future of German in Namibia as threatened.

== History ==
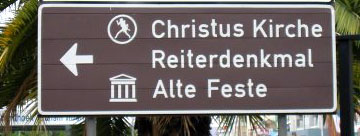
Sign in Windhoek with directions to the German colonial-era monuments Christ Church, Alte Feste and Reiterdenkmal

The Allgemeine Zeitung is the only German-language daily newspaper in Africa and one of the highest-circulation newspapers in Namibia.

During the period when the territory was a German colony from 1884 to 1915, German was the only official language in German Southwest Africa, as Namibia was then known. Boers, i.e. South African whites who spoke Dutch (South African Dutch would later develop into Afrikaans) already lived in the country alongside Orlam tribes and mixed-race Rehoboth Basters.

South Africa took over administration of the country in 1915 when it was captured by the Western Allies during World War I. However, German language privileges and education remained in place. In 1916 the Allgemeine Zeitung newspaper was founded under its original name of Der Kriegsbote. After the end of the First World War the South African attitude to the German Namibians changed, and between 1919 and 1920 about half of the Germans were transferred out of the country. In 1920 Dutch (later to be superseded by Afrikaans) and English replaced German as the official languages of the country.

The German-speaking population wished German to be reinstated as an official language and in 1932 the Treaty of Cape Town encouraged South Africa to do so. It was hoped that this would throw a spanner in the works against South Africa annexing South West Africa into the Union of South Africa. South Africa did not officially recognise German; however, de facto German was added to Afrikaans and English as a working language of the government. In 1984 German was officially added as an official language.

After independence in 1990, English became the sole official language of Namibia. Though German lost its official status, it continues to be used in everyday Namibian life.

== Present ==
=== Degree of use ===
About 31,000 Namibians speak German as a mother tongue, and several tens of thousands of Namibians, either white native speakers of English or Afrikaans (with some Portuguese) or metropolitan black Namibians, speak German as a second language. German is taught in many schools, and is the medium for a daily newspaper, the Allgemeine Zeitung, as well as daily programming on the Namibian Broadcasting Corporation. Although German (and for that matter English) is not common as a mother tongue among the black population, a number of public servants especially in the tourism sector speak German to varying degrees.

However, there are many spheres in which the German language is not or barely present at all — spheres with a small number of white people, especially in the north part of the country, but also in many neighbourhoods of Windhoek.

=== Culture ===
German is used as a medium of communication in a wide range of cultural spheres:

- Churches, most notably the German-speaking Evangelical Lutheran Church in Namibia (GELK)
- Schools (e.g. in the Deutsche Höhere Privatschule Windhoek)
- Literature (German-Namibian authors include Giselher W. Hoffmann)
- Radio and television (German-language programming of the Namibian Broadcasting Corporation, Hitradio and TV Provider Satelio)
- Music (e.g. artist EES)
- Online media (as standard German or Namdeutsch [Namibian German] in social media, forums or online newspapers)

=== Education ===
In addition to 32 schools in which about 14,000 pupils learn German as a foreign language, there are about a dozen German-medium schools, including the Deutsche Höhere Privatschule Windhoek (DHPS), German schools in Omaruru and Otjiwarongo as well as five government schools. There are several additional elementary schools, German-medium high schools and a German-medium Gymnasium in Windhoek.

The University of Namibia also offers German medium education in German studies and business administration.

=== Signs ===
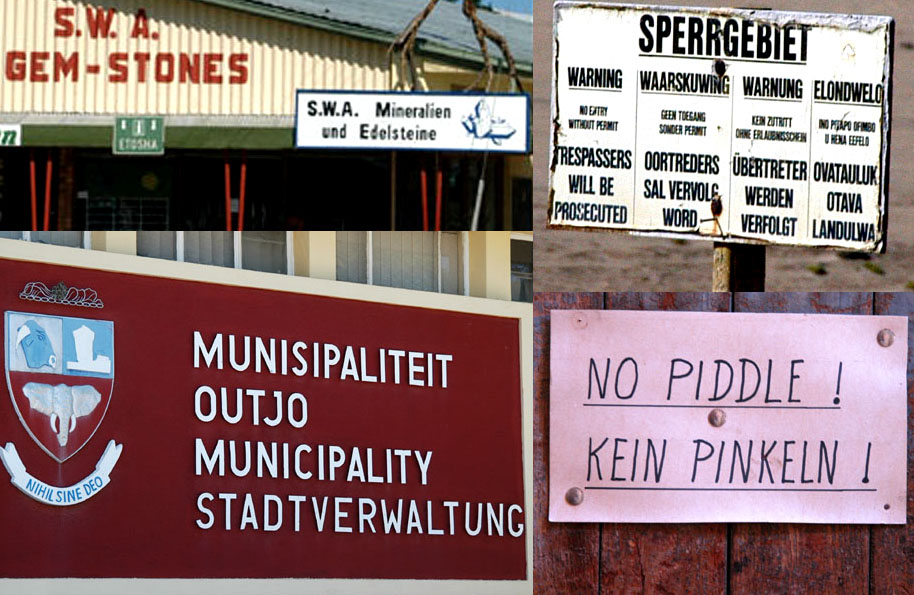
Examples of multilingual signs in Namibia

Signs for shops, restaurants and services are often in English and German, reflecting not only a high proportion of German-Namibian ownership but also the high number of German-speaking tourists that visit the country. However, a customer entering such a shop may well be greeted in Afrikaans; relatively fewer signs are in Afrikaans but the language retains a leading position as a spoken lingua franca in Windhoek and throughout the central and southern parts of the country. German and Afrikaans (along w/ its parent language Dutch) are closely related Germanic languages.

German is also found on signs for tourists, especially those to monuments and historic buildings from the German colonial period. Other signs that include German date back before 1990, when English, Afrikaans and German shared status as official languages of the country.

=== Place names ===
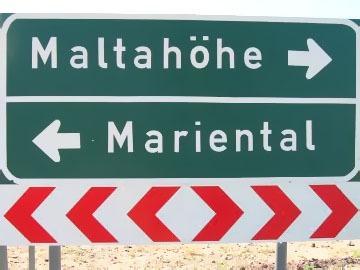
German place names are especially prevalent in the south of the country.

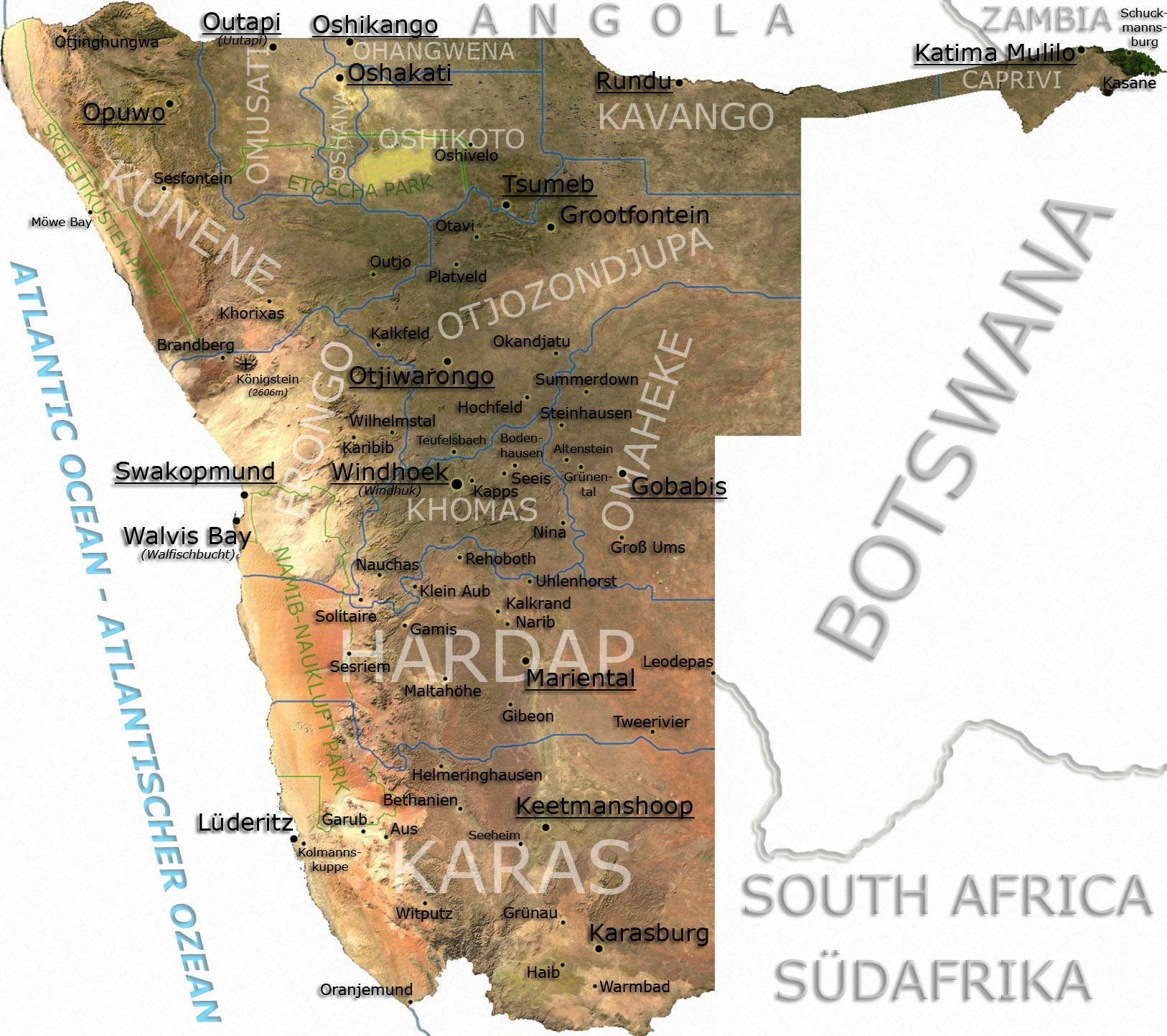
Namibia contains many Afrikaans and German place names, except for in the northern part of the country.

Unlike other parts of the world with large German immigration and large numbers of German place names, only few places had their name changed, for example Luhonono, the former Schuckmannsburg. Especially in the south, in the regions of Hardap and ǁKaras, many place names are German or Afrikaans. Examples include Keetmanshoop (after German industrialist Johann Keetman and the Afrikaans word for "hope", and Lüderitz, named after the German merchant Adolf Lüderitz.

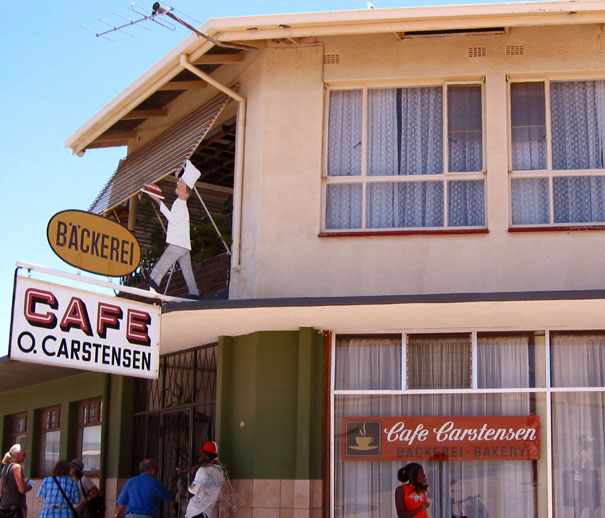
Carstensen Bakery in Otjiwarongo

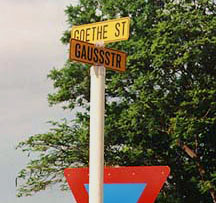
Bilingual sign in Grootfontein:
Goethe St(reet)
Gaussstr(aße)

=== Street names ===
In Windhoek, Swakopmund, Keetmanshoop, Grootfontein and Lüderitz many or most street names are German in origin, even though after 1990 many streets were renamed to honor black Namibian people, predominantly but not exclusively from the currently ruling SWAPO party. (See for example List of former Swakopmund street names). Streets named before 1990 often end in "Str.", the standard abbreviation in German for Straße, and in Afrikaans for straat; streets renamed since 1990 often end in "St.", implying the English abbreviation for "Street".

=== Building names ===
Many colonial buildings and structures have retained their original German names. Examples include Windhoek's castles Heinitzburg, Schwerinsburg and Sanderburg, Windhoek's Alte Feste (Old Fortress) and the Reiterdenkmal (Equestrian Statue) stored in its yard. Swakopmund also has many buildings still known by their German names, for instance Altes Gefängnis (Old Prison).

== Namibian German as a dialect ==
The German language as spoken in Namibia is characterised by simplification and the adoption of many words from Afrikaans, South African English, and Ovambo and other Bantu languages. This variant of German is called variously Südwesterdeutsch (German südwest, southwest, referring to the country's former name, South West Africa); while younger people also call it Namsläng (i.e. Namibian slang) or Namdeutsch.

== See also ==
- Namibian Black German
- Languages of Namibia

== Literature ==
- Marianne Zappen-Thomson: Deutsch als Fremdsprache in Namibia., Klaus-Hess-Verlag, Windhoek 2000, ISBN 3-933117-15-1.
- Joe Pütz: Das grosse Dickschenärie. Peters Antiques, Windhoek Namibia 2001, ISBN 99916-50-46-6.
- Erik Sell: Esisallesoreidt, Nam Släng - Deutsch, Deutsch - NAM Släng. EeS Records, Windhoek Namibia, 2009, ASIN B005AU8R82.
