= Germany–Namibia relations =

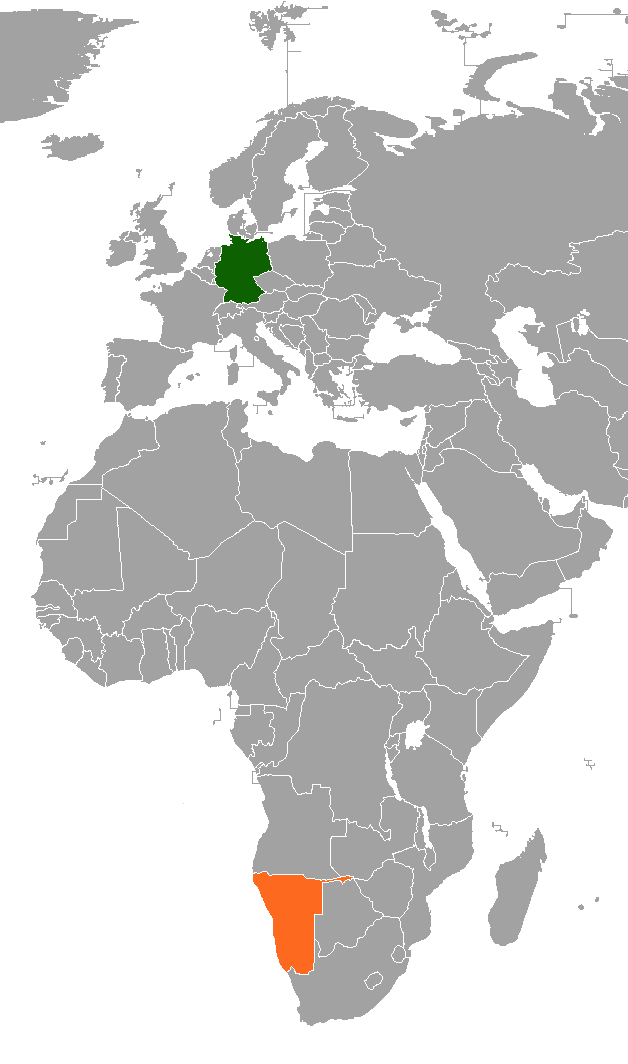

- Germany: Namibia

Germany–Namibia relations (German: Beziehungen zwischen Deutschland und Namibia) are the bilateral relationship of Germany and Namibia. This relationship is of particular importance as Namibia was colonized and occupied by the German Empire in the 19th century. There is also a community of approximately 30,000 German Namibians residing in Namibia today. Both nations are members of the United Nations. Culturally, both countries are part of the Germanosphere. The current ambassador of Namibia to Germany is Jerobeam Shaanika.

== History ==
=== Pre-colonial relations ===
First contacts between people of the two countries took place when German missionaries were hired by the London Missionary Society to commence working in Southern Namibia during the late eighteenth century and early nineteenth century.

=== German South West Africa and Herero and Nama genocide ===
During the Scramble for Africa, while present-day Namibia was occupied by Germany and known as German South West Africa, the United Kingdom occupied Walvis Bay and incorporated the port area to its possession in the Cape Colony. In 1890, the British government apportioned the Caprivi Strip to the Germans. This would give Germany access to the Zambezi River and its other East African territories, and it would give up its claims on Zanzibar (which was transferred to the United Kingdom).

Between 1904 and 1908, Germany waged a genocide against the Herero and Nama people of Namibia. The genocide began in 1904 after a Herero and Nama rebellion over German seizures of their land and cattle. In retaliation, the German military administration led by Lothar von Trotha called for the extermination of the population in response. Tens of thousands Herero and Nama people were killed during the genocide.

In 1915, during World War I, troops from South Africa invaded and occupied the territory. After the war, with the signing of the Treaty of Versailles, Germany was forced to transfer its territory to the Union of South Africa in 1920, which at the time was a self-governing dominion of the British Empire. The territory would be called South West Africa for the next 70 years.

=== Namibian independence and post-independence relations ===
In 1966, SWAPO launched an armed struggle against South African occupation which became known as the South African Border War. In 1989 hostilities ceased in Namibia and in March 1990, Namibia became an independent nation. Namibian independence coincided with German reunification in October of that same year with both nations establishing diplomatic relations. In March 1998, German President Roman Herzog paid an official visit to Namibia.

In August 2004, German minister for development, Heidemarie Wieczorek-Zeul, recognized Germany's historical and moral responsibility for the genocide of the Herero and Nama people after 100 years. As a result, Germany decided to provide development aid to Namibia. In September 2011, the German government returned skulls from colonial-era killings to Namibia. More skulls and bones were returned during separate ceremonies in 2014 and 2018.

In 2015, negotiations start between the German and Namibian governments regarding an official apology and aid money. In 2016, the German government recognized the mass murder of Herero and Nama by German troops as genocide in an official document.

In May 2021, both countries announced that an agreement has been reached in which Germany recognizes the atrocities committed against the Herero and Nama people in the early 1900s as genocide. The German government pledged to spend €1.1 billion over 30 years for infrastructure and development aid in Namibia. The payments do not include reparations.

In 2020, the bilateral aid from Germany to Namibia amounted to €45.16 million.

Relations soured between Germany and Namibia in 2024, after president Hage Geingob criticized Germany's support for Israel in the South Africa v. Israel case at the International Court of Justice. Geingob said that Germany had an "inability to draw lessons from its horrific history."

== Bilateral agreements ==
Both nations have signed a few bilateral agreements such as an agreement on the avoidance of double taxation and prevention of fiscal evasion with respect to taxes on income and capital (1996) and an agreement on the promotion of investments (1997).

== Tourism and transportation ==
Approximately 120,000 German visitors visit Namibia each year. There are direct flights between Frankfurt and Windhoek with Eurowings Discover.

== Trade ==
In 2018, trade between both nations totaled €200 million Euros. Germany's main exports to Namibia include: machines, food products, electro-technical products, electronics, chemical products, automotive products, measurement and control technology. Namibia's main export products to Germany include: non-ferrous metals, food products, raw materials (except fuels), automotive products, machinery, leather products and natural oils.

In August 2021, the two countries signed a joint declaration of intent (JCoI) in order to establish a green hydrogen partnership. In May 2023, a Namibian company, Hyphen Hydrogen Energy, which is a subsidiary of Germany-headquartered Enertrag, agreed a $10 billion green hydrogen project with the Namibian government to export its production to Europe once built in the Tsau ǁKhaeb Sperrgebiet National Park.

== Resident diplomatic missions ==
- Germany has an embassy in Windhoek.
- Namibia has an embassy in Berlin.
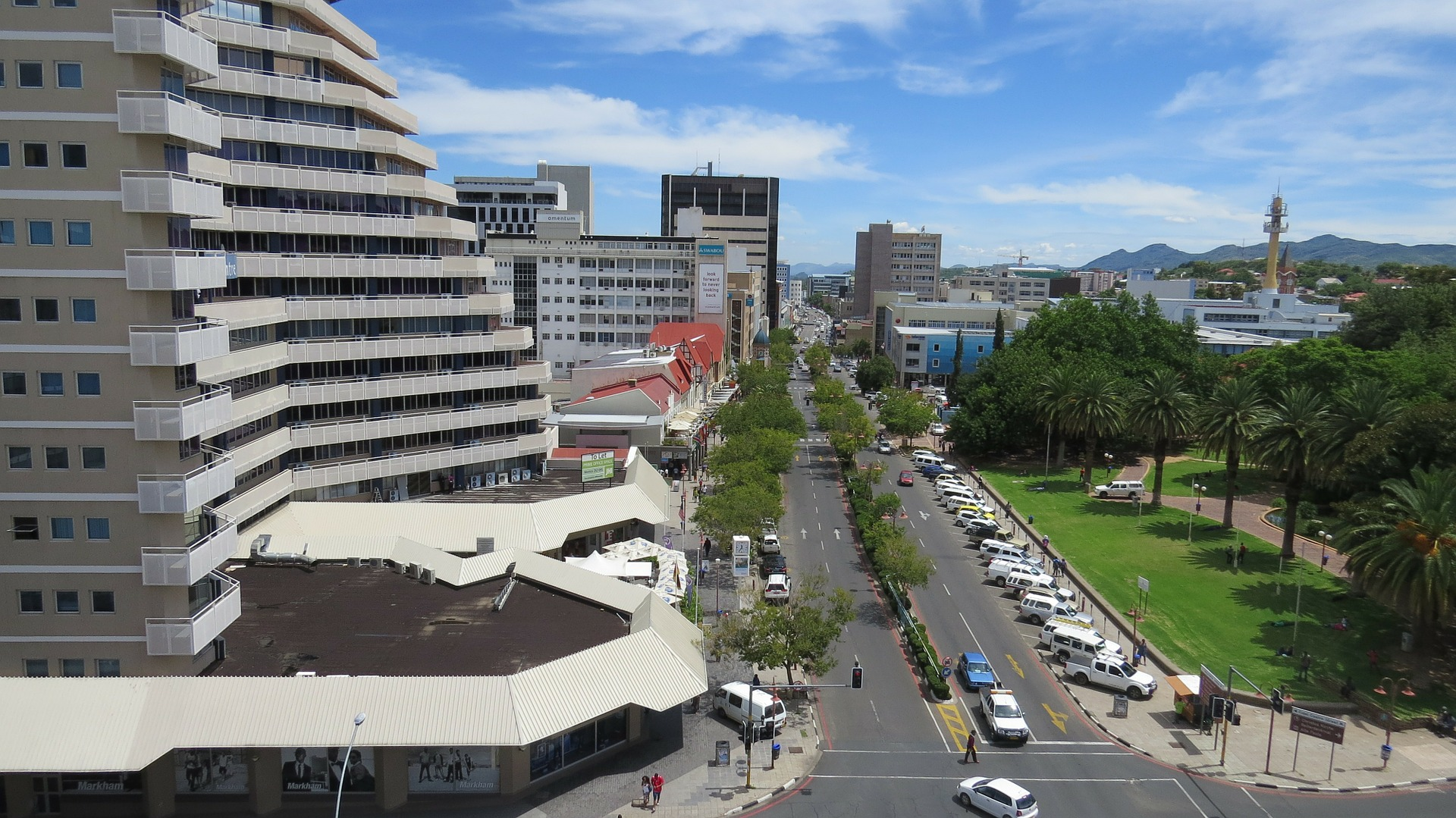
Sanlam Centre (left) hosting the Embassy of Germany in Windhoek

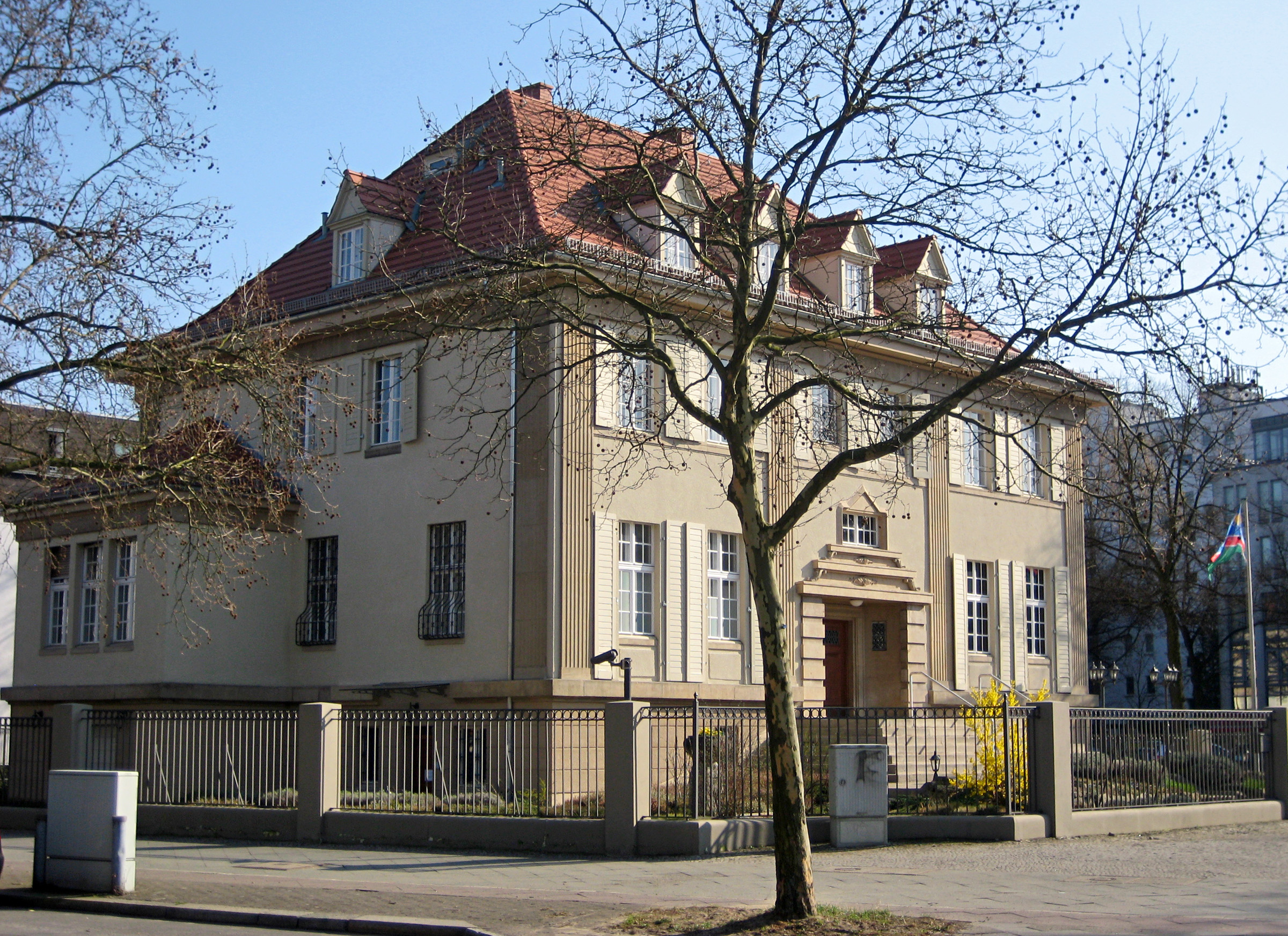
Embassy of Namibia in Berlin

== Diplomatic staff ==
- Jerobeam Shaanika, Namibia's ambassador to Germany (2025–)

== See also ==
- German South West Africa
- German Namibians
- West German Relations with Namibia
