= Altes Gefängnis =

Historic prison in Swakopmund, Namibia

Coordinates: 22°40′16″S 14°31′56″E

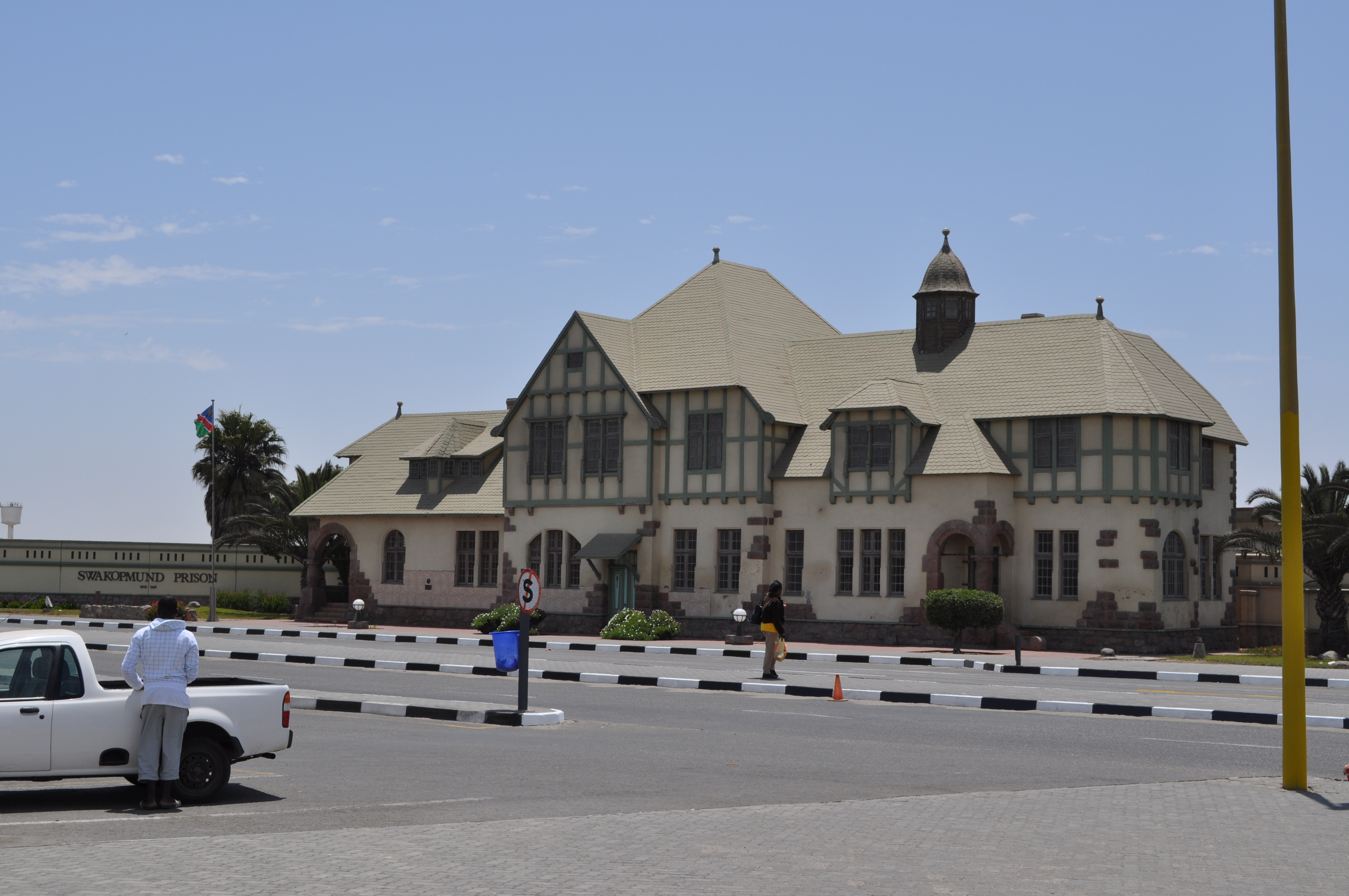
Historic prison building in Swakopmund

Altes Gefängnis (German for "old prison") is a former prison in Swakopmund, Namibia. It was constructed in 1909 by the German Empire and designed by German architect Heinrich Bause. The large main building was used to house the prison's staff, while the prisoners themselves were kept in other quarters.
