= Richard Kunzmann =

South African novelist (born 1976)

Richard Kunzmann (born 1976) is a Namibian born novelist, predominantly of crime fiction. He grew up in South Africa. His first novel, Bloody Harvests, in a murder mystery set in South Africa and features SAPS detectives Harry Mason and Jacob Tsahbalala. It was first published in 2004, and features a conspiracy involving a grisly series of homicides in which the victims' bodies are used to make muti (traditional medicine.) Two other novels, Salamander Cotton and Dead-End Road feature the same characters.
