= Sylvia Schlettwein =

Namibian writer (born 1975)

- Born: November 16, 1975 (age 50); Omaruru, South West Africa
- Occupations: Writer, teacher, translator, critic

Sylvia Schlettwein (born 16 November 1975) is a Namibian writer, teacher, translator and literary critic. She was the Head of the Department for Languages and Communication at the International University of Management in the capital Windhoek. Since 2024 she is lecturer at the German Section at the University of Namibia (UNAM).

== Biography ==
Schlettwein was born in Omaruru. Schlettwein is one of four daughters of politician Calle Schlettwein. Her publication Bullies, Beasts and Beauties, is a collection of short stories co-authored with Isabella Morris. She received a Highly Commended Award in the 2010 Commonwealth Short Story competition for her story “Framing the Nation” and was selected for the 2011 FEMRITE Residency for African Women Writers in Kampala, Uganda. In 2012 she attended the Kwani? Litfest within the framework of the Moving Africa Programme by the Goethe-Institut.

Serubiri Moses highlights a kind of individual feminist tendency in her story "Mother of the Beast", from the anthology Summoning the Rains, when he says "It is twisted in a way that puts self-individualism at the forefront without seeming too crude or too bitter. Everyone seems to try, but eventually give up. She in turn is left alone in that last scene with her jackal fur wrapped around her shoulders, failing to pull together her family life or her work life, left in a trance, bleak and abandoned."

== Selected works ==
- Ape shit. In: Terra incognita: new short speculative stories from Africa. Hrsg.: Nerine Dorman. Short Story Day Africa, South Africa; Modjaji Books, Oxford 2015, ISBN 978-1-920590-99-4
- Schlettwein, Sylvia (September 2014). "African Dreams, German Campfire, English Words". BAKWA Magazine.
- Schlettwein, Sylvia (2018), "When the colonised imperialists go post-colonial: Namibian-German literature since independence", in Krishnamurthy, Sarala; Vale, Helen (eds.), Writing Namibia: Literature in Transition, Windhoek: University of Namibia Press, pp. 327–346
- Schlettwein, Sylvia (2021). Katima. A Namibian Childhood, Kuiseb Publisher, Windhoek 2023,
