= German African Party =

The German African Party (in German: Deutsche Afrikanische Partei) was a small anti-Nazi political party which existed in South West Africa (currently Namibia) from the 1930s through the 1950s.

The German African Party was created on 8 February 1939, by Martin Maier as a result of political tensions within a rightist conservative party named Deutscher Südwest-Bund (DSWB) (or “German Southwest Union”), currently disappeared as well. Like the German Nazi Party (National-Sozialistische Deutsche Arbeiter Partei -NSDAP-, or “National-Socialist Party of the German Workers”), all of these parties were overtly racist, as they only accepted members with German ancestry.
