= National Archives of Namibia =

Coordinates: 22°33′25.9″S 17°5′10.8″E

The National Archives of Namibia (NAN) is the national archives of Namibia, located in Windhoek. It was established in 1939 and today shares a building with the National Library of Namibia. NAN belongs to the National Library and Archives service of the Namibian government, in the Ministry of Education, Arts and Culture.

== History ==
The Imperial German administration of German South West Africa established a record-keeping system at the Tintenpalast building, the seat of successive parliaments. In 1939 the South West Africa Archives Depot was founded by the South African government of South West Africa. German documents surviving World War I were incorporated. In 1957 the Archives moved into the building of the Windhoek Public Library in Lüderitz Street.

After Namibian independence in 1990 the Archives was administered by the Government of Namibia, mandated by the Archives Act (Act #12 of 1992). In 2000 was moved into its current building in Eugène Marais Street in downtown Windhoek, where the National Library of Namibia is also situated.

== Records ==
In 1993 the Archives held 5,600 maps, 61,000 photographs, 2,000 audio cassettes, 450 films and a complete collection of all local newspapers from 1897 to 1962. Of particular importance are the Hendrik Witbooi Papers, inscribed in the UNESCO Memory of the World Register – Africa, the Hoachanas Peace Treaty of 1858, and the Vaderlike Wette of the Basters of Rehoboth.

In 2022 the Archives counted 6,000 maps and building plans, 40,000 photos and 30,000 audiovisual items. Government and court records occupy more than 10 kilometres (6.2 mi) of shelves.

== National Archives App ==
In January 2024, the National Archives of Namibia launched an National Archives App to preserve and promote cultural heritage.

== See also ==
- List of national archives
