= National Museum of Namibia =

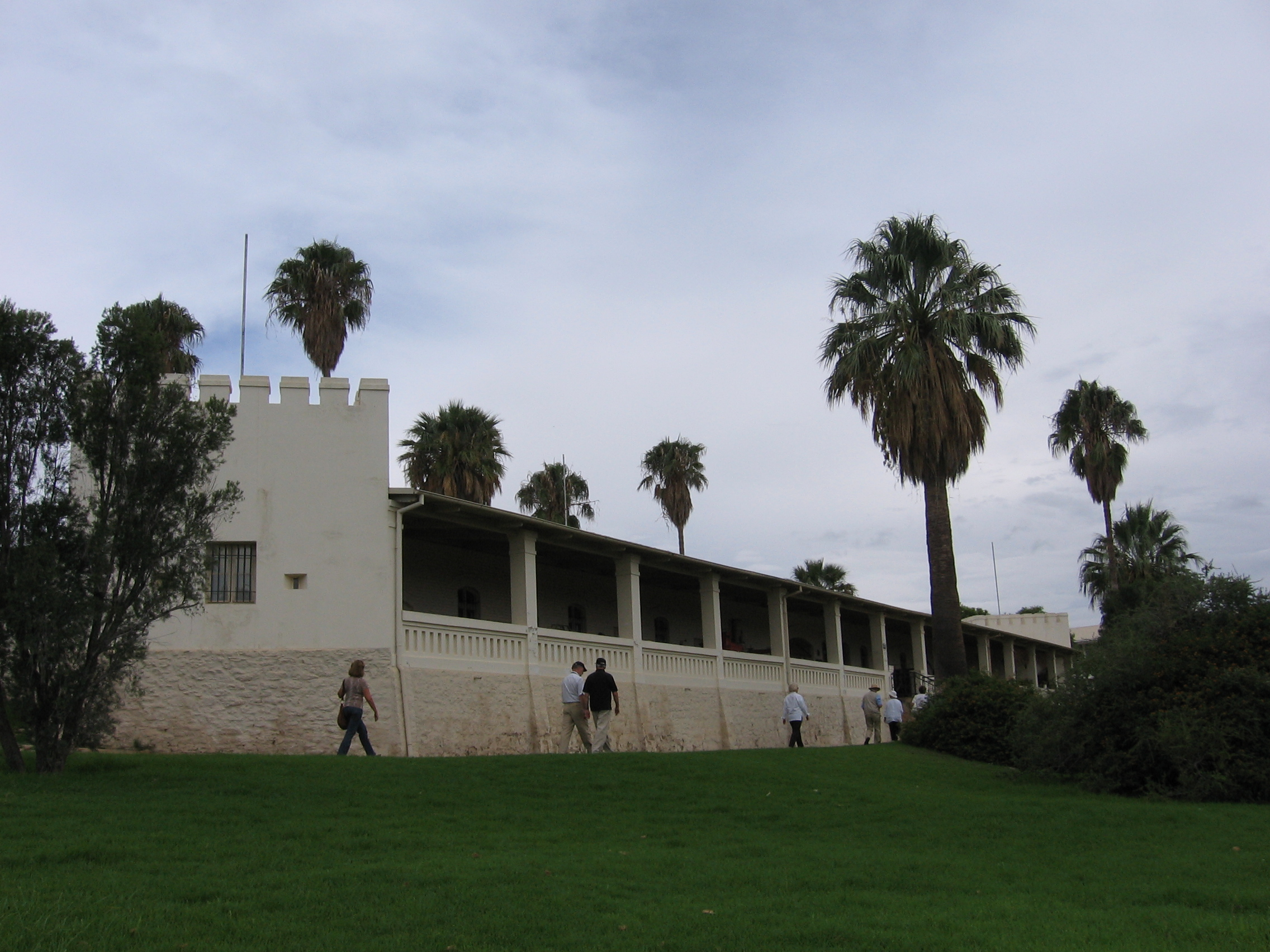
- Alte Feste in Robert Mugabe Avenue, 2006
- Established: 1907 as the State Museum
- Location: Windhoek, Namibia
- Type: National museum

The National Museum of Namibia is a historical and zoological museum in Windhoek, the capital of Namibia. It is governed by the Ministry of Education, Arts and Culture of the Namibian government.

== Location and description ==
The National Museum is located in three different places in central Windhoek. The Owela Display Centre (after the Owela board game) houses the zoological and general scientific collection. It is located on Lüderitz Street and shares a building with the Windhoek Public Library. As of 2023, the 1958 building is dilapidated, and the Owela museum is closed.

The Alte Feste Museum houses the historic collection. It is located at the Alte Feste (English: Old Fortress) building on Robert Mugabe Avenue, next to the Independence Memorial Museum. The administrative offices of the National Museum and the National Museum Library, established in 1963, are also located on Robert Mugabe Avenue, opposite the Alte Feste in the so called Emma Hoogenhout Building. As of 2023, Alte Feste is closed and in urgent need of renovation. It is planned to repurpose the building into a Center for Arts, Craft and Heritage and a National Genocide Museum

== History ==
A museum was established by the Imperial German administration of German South West Africa in 1907. It was called the Landesmuseum (English: state museum). In 1925, with the territory now under South African administration, the museum was renamed the South West Africa Museum. Responsibility of the museum was transferred to the South African government of South West Africa in 1957, and the name changed to State Museum. After Namibian independence in 1990, it was administered by the Government of Namibia, and in 1994 the name was changed to National Museum of Namibia.
