= Nicola Brandt =

Namibian-German artist

- Born: 1983 (age 42–43); Windhoek, Namibia
- Occupation: Artist

Nicola Brandt (born April 5, 1983, in Windhoek, Namibia) is a Namibian-German artist working at the intersection of memory studies, landscape, ecology, and feminist and queer theory. Much of her work uses the metaphor of place and landscape and centres around themes of power, desire, and destruction.

Brandt's artistic production takes the form of photographs and drawings, multi-channel videos, and installations. Brandt became known as a representative of a young generation of Namibian artists, especially through her new, critical approach to landscape and her decolonial examination of German colonial history and her memorial work. She advocates for intersectional solidarity and queer ecologies and has mentored several younger artists and students in related fields.

== Early and personal life ==
As a student, Brandt received a full scholarship for her undergraduate degree in Art History and Humanities in the Ancient World at John Cabot University in Rome. Already at that stage, Brandt chose to focus on contemporary art from Southern Africa, especially after attending lectures by William Kentridge at Temple University. The writing and photographic work of Santu Mofokeng also had a deep impact on her.

Brandt completed a MSt in History of Art and Visual Culture at the Department of History of Art and St Catherine’s College at Oxford University in 2008. In 2015, she received her DPhil in Fine Art from the Ruskin School of Art and Christ Church at Oxford with the dissertation Emerging Landscapes: Memory, Trauma and its Afterimage in Post-Apartheid Namibia and South Africa. She currently lives and works between Namibia and Germany.

== Work ==
Brandt is one of the first of her generation of Namibian artists who has used a cross-disciplinary approach to critique the memory culture of German colonialism and how it is situated in place. In her work she considers how, through photography, video, and performance, memory, and memory situated in place, can be explored and questioned.

Her work has featured in intergovernmental talks between Namibia and Germany. In her first project as a young artist, Brandt documented the removal of the Reiterdenkmal, an equestrian statue that stood on an imposing plinth in Windhoek, the capital of Namibia, in honour of German colonial rule. The memorial was first removed from its central location in 2009 and finally placed in the inner courtyard of the Alte Feste in 2013.

Brandt’s exhibition The Earth Inside (2014) at the National Art Gallery of Namibia combined performance, video, photography, and installation. The work examined and critiqued traditional Eurocentric ideas of landscape, especially in relationship to the colonial war and Genocide (1904–1908) and investigated how the past continues to insert itself into the present in various guises. In her video work Indifference (2014), German historical memory and the romantic tradition that sustains it, are interrogated. The multiscreen video was shown in a fringe exhibition at the Venice Biennale in 2015 alongside the work of the German artist and Golden Lion Award winner Christoph Schlingensief. Brandt explores moments in the lives of two women through fragments of their lived experiences. The stories are accompanied by large-scale triptychs of the Namibian desert coastline and its hinterland, with deceitfully beautiful derelict landscapes that contain places of historical violence. The video foregrounds involuntary memory and the way that unresolved trauma breaks out in everyday engagements. In a body of work created in 2022 and 2023 with the artists Gift Uzera and Muningandu Hoveka, one of the artistic strategies was to highlight questions related to history and memory as a counterpoint to state-sanctioned memorialisation. In their performance during the removal of the monument to the German colonizer Curt von Francois, and in a subsequent exhibition, marginalized groups or individuals who have been excluded or misrepresented in Namibia’s dominant historical narrative, were commemorated. As a feminist and queer ally, Brandt sees these counter-memorials and forms of collaboration as meaningful gestures towards present and place-making and cultural regeneration. By creating counter-memorials, artists and activists aim to provide a space for critical reflection and dialogue about the past and its impact on the present.

=== Other work and publications ===
Brandt is the author of the monograph Landscapes between Then and Now: Recent Histories in Southern African Photography, Video and Performance Art published by Bloomsbury in 2020. She has contributed to several publications including The Journey: New Positions in African Photography (2020), co-edited by Simon Njami and Sean O’Toole. Brandt is the founder and series editor of Conversations Across Place (CAP), which provides a research and publishing platform for artists and writers engaging with landscape in its broader sense. The first CAP volume Reckoning with an Entangled World (2021) was published by Greenbox Publishing in Berlin.

=== Selected Collections ===
- Scheryn Art Collection
- Iwalewahaus Collection, Bayreuth, Germany
- National Art Gallery, Namibia
- Embassy of Namibia, Berlin, Germany
- Würth Collection, Germany
- Ministry of Lands and Resettlement, Windhoek, Namibia

=== Publications ===
- Nicola Brandt (2020). Landscapes between Then and Now: Recent Histories in Southern African Photography, Video and Performance Art. Bloomsbury. ISBN 978-1350024007
- Nicola Brandt. Time, Performance and Landscape in Simon Njami, Sean O’Toole (eds.) (2020), The Journey: New Positions in African Photography. Kerber. ISBN 978-3-7356-0682-2
- Nicola Brandt, Frances Whorrall-Campbell (eds.) (2021). Conversations Across Place Volume 1: Reckoning with An Entangled World. The Green Box. ISBN 978-3-96216-007-4.

== Awards and scholarships ==
- 2010–2014 Christ Church, University of Oxford, Hugh Pilkington Scholarship
- 2014 Namibian Film and Theatre Awards: Indifference, Special Mention of the Jury
- 2016 IFA (Institut für Auslandsbeziehungen)
- 2016 Wellcome Trust: Participant in Seed Award in Humanities and Social Science
- 2017 Leverhulme Trust (shortlisted), Oxford Humanities Division and Ruskin School of Art, University of Oxford, Diversifying Portraiture, Vice-Chancellor’s Diversity Fund, University of Oxford
- 2017–2018 Gerda Henkel Foundation Fellowship
- 2019: Best Exhibition: The Artists Association, Oslo
- 2020–2021: Kowitz Foundation Grant to produce Conversations Across Place (CaP)
