= List of cemeteries in Windhoek =

A complete list of cemeteries in Windhoek, the capital of Namibia:

== Historic cemeteries ==
- Leutwein Cemetery (1892–1904), situated between Robert Mugabe Avenue and Leutwein Street in Central Windhoek. Sometimes regarded as two different cemeteries with one piece left and one piece right of Mugabe Avenue. The burial place is named after Theodor Leutwein, colonial administrator of German South West Africa from 1894 to 1904.
- Gammams Cemetery (1904–1927) on the western side of Gammams River between today's suburbs of Hochland Park and Pioneers Park. The cemetery started as an informal burial ground for victims of the Herero Wars. Gammams Cemetery accommodates Namibia's only crematory.
- Old Location Cemetery (1927–1960), today a national monument named Old Location Cemetery Museum, in Hochland Road, Hochland Park. Contains the mass grave of people killed in the Old Location Uprising in December 1959.
- Veronica Street Cemetery in the Ludwigsdorf suburb
- Katutura Cemetery in Claudius Kandovazu Street, Katutura

== Current cemeteries ==
- Old Location Cemetery (opened 1927), an extension to the Gammams cemetery on the eastern side of Gammams River. The name stems from Windhoek's former Old Location, a segregated reserve for Windhoek's non-white population. The cemetery itself became racially segregated in 1926. There is an Old Location Cemetery Museum and a mass grave for people killed in the Old Location Uprisings in December 1959. The mass grave was listed on the National Heritage Register in August 2004. The entire cemetery was provisionally proclaimed a national monument in 1987 but failed to be listed. The provisional proclamation expired 5 years later.
- Oponganda Cemetery (May 2001-) on Otjomuise Road in the Grysblock suburb, opposite Gammams Water Works. It is Katutura's largest cemetery, accommodating 4,500 adult graves and 6,900 graves of children.
- Khomasdal Cemetery (1965-) on the corner of Begonia Street and Roos Street in the suburb of Khomasdal. There are no more new graves available at this cemetery; it accommodated 6,750 adult graves and 3,500 graves of children.
- Heroes' Acre, situated 10 kilometres (6.2 mi) south of Windhoek, is a burial ground for Namibian National Heroes and Heroines. The burial site consists of 174 tombs, not all of which are currently occupied.

== Future cemeteries ==
- Rocky Crest Cemetery in the suburb of Rocky Crest, opened in 2016
- a cemetery in the Goreangab suburb
