= Windhoek West Constituency =

Electoral constituency in Windhoek, Namibia

Coordinates: 22°35′18.59″S 17°3′46.07″E

Windhoek West constituency (red) in the Khomas Region

Windhoek West Constituency is an electoral constituency in the Khomas Region of Namibia. It contains the affluent suburbs of Hochland Park, Pioneers Park, Academia, Cimbebasia, Rocky Crest, Windhoek North and Windhoek West. It had a population of 53,438 in 2011, up from 42,201 in 2001. As of 2020, it has 33,556 registered voters.

== Politics ==
The first councillor of this constituency was Henk Mudge of the Democratic Turnhalle Alliance (DTA). In 2003 Sophia Shaningwa of the SWAPO Party won the seat in a by-election triggered by Mudge's resignation from the National Council. She served for the remainder of the term. Shaningwa was reelected in the 2004 regional election, gaining 3,408 of the 6,196 votes cast.

In 2010 Shikwetepo Haindongo (SWAPO) took over as councillor of Windhoek West. When Haindongo died in August 2014 a by-election was held in November which was won overwhelmingly by Georg Trepper of SWAPO. Trepper was reelected in the 2015 regional election with 3,781 of the 5,477 votes, followed by Sophia Panizza (DTA, 1,175 votes) and Maureen Dunn of the Rally for Democracy and Progress (RDP) with 521 votes. In the 2020 regional election the SWAPO candidate won narrowly. Emma Muteka obtained 3,250 votes, followed by Jacobus Visagie of the Independent Patriots for Change (IPC), an opposition party formed in August 2020, with 3,247 votes.
