= National Library of Namibia =

- 22°33′25.9″S 17°5′10.8″E
- Location: Windhoek, Namibia, Namibia
- Type: National library
- Established: 1926

Collection
- Legal deposit: Yes

The National Library of Namibia (NLN) is the legal deposit and copyright library for Namibia. The library is situated in Windhoek. NLN belongs to the National Library and Archives service of the Namibian government, in the Ministry of Education, Arts and Culture. The National Library is guided by a Policy Framework for Libraries and Allied Information Agencies for Namibia of 1997 and the Namibia Library and Information Service Act 4 of 2000.

== History ==
The institution was established in the Tintenpalast building as the Legislative Assembly Library of South West Africa in 1926. Items from the Bibliothek des Kaiserlichen Gouvernements (German: Library of the Imperial Government) from the time of Imperial German colonisation were incorporated and formed the core of the initial collection. It was renamed South West Africa Administration Library in 1957. In 1960, responsibility for the library shifted from the Parliament of South Africa to the government, and the library now fell under the Ministry of Education. In 1965 it opened to the public.

In 1984 the library moved to the Estorff House nearby and was renamed Estorff Reference Library. After Namibian independence in 1990 the library was administered by the Government of Namibia, and on 1 April 1994 became the National Library of Namibia. On 20 March 2000, the eve of the 10th independence celebrations, the library moved into its current building in Eugène Marais Street in downtown Windhoek, sharing it with the National Archives of Namibia.

== See also ==
- National Archives of Namibia
- List of national libraries
