= North Korea and African decolonization =

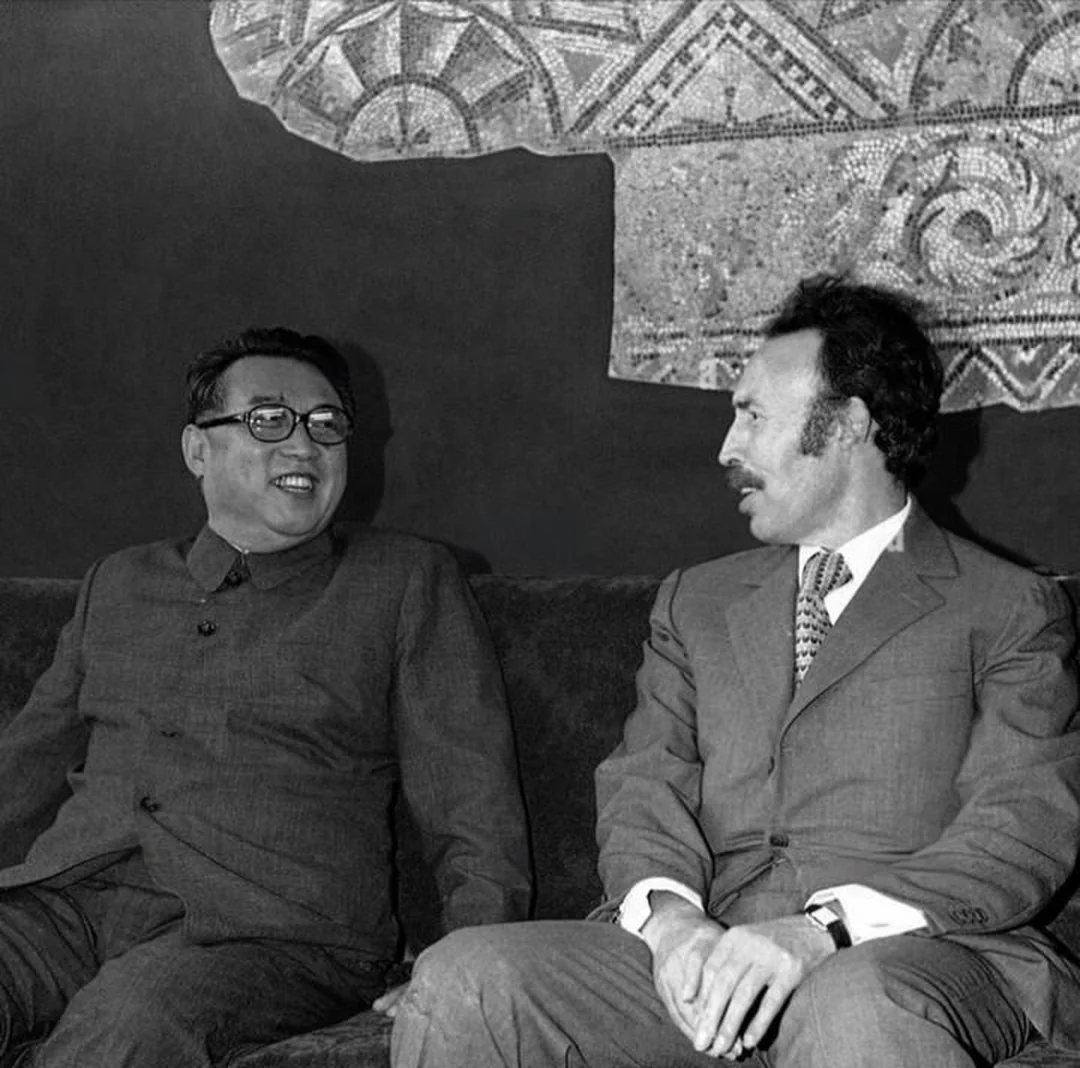
Kim Il Sung and Algerian President Houari Boumédiène in 1975

North Korea and African decolonization summarizes the Democratic People’s Republic of Korea’s (DPRK) connections with African liberation movements and countries that obtained independence from the late 1950s to the early 1990s. Their interactions include diplomatic recognition, political and military training, material assistance, and cultural diplomacy, often matching the foreign-policy ideals of Juche.

== Background ==
The DPRK was founded in 1948 after Japan ended its colonial rule in 1945, and the Korean War (1950–1953) reinforced national security as one of its primary foreign policy goals. As a result, North Korea promoted their Juche ideology as a lesson from their colonial history and civil war, which it later presented to its African partners. In addition, the Sino–Soviet split pushed Pyongyang (capital of North Korea) to start outreaching to the Third World, including Africa, diversifying partners beyond the socialist bloc and hedging between China and the Soviet Union.

== Diplomatic relations and recognition ==
From the late 1950s through the 1990s, the DPRK pursued recognition and opened embassies across Africa. It often established relationships with African states during their liberation movements and converted the ties into formal diplomatic recognition after they successfully declared independence.

Timetable of Diplomatic Relations
Country	Date of DPRK Recognition	Notes
Algeria	25 September 1958	—
Angola	16 November 1975	—
Benin	5 February 1973	—
Botswana	27 December 1974	Relations severed in 2014.
Burkina Faso	11 October 1972	—
Burundi	12 March 1967	—
Cape Verde	18 August 1975	Now officially Cabo Verde.
Cameroon	3 March 1972	—
Central African Republic	5 September 1969	—
Chad	8 May 1969	—
Comoros	13 November 1975	—
Congo-Brazzaville	24 December 1964	—
Democratic Republic of the Congo	15 December 1972	Also known as Zaire.
Côte d’Ivoire	9 January 1985	—
Djibouti	13 June 1993	—
Egypt	24 August 1963	—
Equatorial Guinea	30 January 1969	—
Eritrea	25 May 1993	—
Eswatini (then Swaziland)	20 September 2007	Renamed as Eswatini in 2018.
Ethiopia	5 June 1975	—
Gabon	29 January 1974	—
The Gambia	2 March 1973	—
Ghana	28 December 1964	—
Guinea	8 October 1958	—
Guinea-Bissau	16 March 1974	—
Kenya	12 May 1975	—
Lesotho	19 July 1980	Relations suspended in 1986 but restored later.
Liberia	20 December 1973	—
Libya	23 January 1974	—
Madagascar	16 November 1972	—
Malawi	25 June 1982	—
Mali	29 August 1961	—
Mauritania	12 November 1964	Relations suspended from 1977 to 1980.
Mauritius	16 March 1973	—
Morocco	13 February 1989	—
Mozambique	25 June 1975	—
Namibia	22 March 1990	—
Niger	6 September 1974	—
Nigeria	25 May 1976	—
Rwanda	22 April 1972	—
São Tomé and Príncipe	9 August 1975	—
Senegal	8 September 1972	—
Seychelles	28 June 1976	—
Sierra Leone	14 October 1971	—
Somalia	13 April 1967	—
South Africa	10 August 1998	—
South Sudan	18 November 2011	—
Sudan	21 June 1969	—
Tanzania	13 January 1965	—
Togo	31 January 1973	—
Tunisia	3 August 1975	—
Uganda	2 August 1972	—
Western Sahara (SADR)	16 March 1976	—
Zambia	12 April 1969	—
Zimbabwe	18 April 1980	—

== Training, arms, and material support ==
North Korea provided African states with military support during their decolonization and nation-building processes. Notable examples include Angola (MPLA victory, 1975), Mozambique (Mozambique Liberation Front government, 1975), Zimbabwe (independence, 1980), and Ethiopia (the Derg revolution, 1974).

=== Southern Africa ===
North Korea provided political–military instruction and guerrilla training for African National Congress (ANC) and South West Africa People’s Organization (SWAPO). In Zimbabwe, 106 DPRK advisers trained the Fifth Brigade after Robert Mugabe’s 1980 visit to Pyongyang. Hundreds of DPRK instructors also trained the Zairean Kamanyola Division before it entered Angola in late 1975.

=== Central and East Africa ===
A treaty of friendship and cooperation and a general agreement on economic, scientific, technical, and cultural cooperation was established after Ethiopia's minister of defense visited Pyongyang in 1983. The military assistance included shipbuilding, fishing vessels and a hydroelectric project. DPRK military experts were also reported in at least eleven states (Angola, Benin, Congo, Libya, Madagascar, Mozambique, Seychelles, Tanzania, Uganda, Zambia, and Zimbabwe) with about 55 advisers in Seychelles and about 50 in Madagascar (including a loan of four Mikoyan-Gurevich MiG-17 fighter aircraft to the President of Madagascar).

== Political education and ideological exchange ==
In DPRK doctrine, Juche synthesizes political independence (chaju), economic self-reliance (charip), and self-defence (chawi). It was elevated to state ideology in the 1972 constitution and promoted abroad as a post-colonial governance model. From the mid-1970s, Pyongyang presented the Non-Aligned Movement as a venue to advocate "independence", publicize the "Korea question", and cast Asia, Africa, and Latin America as the vanguard of world revolution.

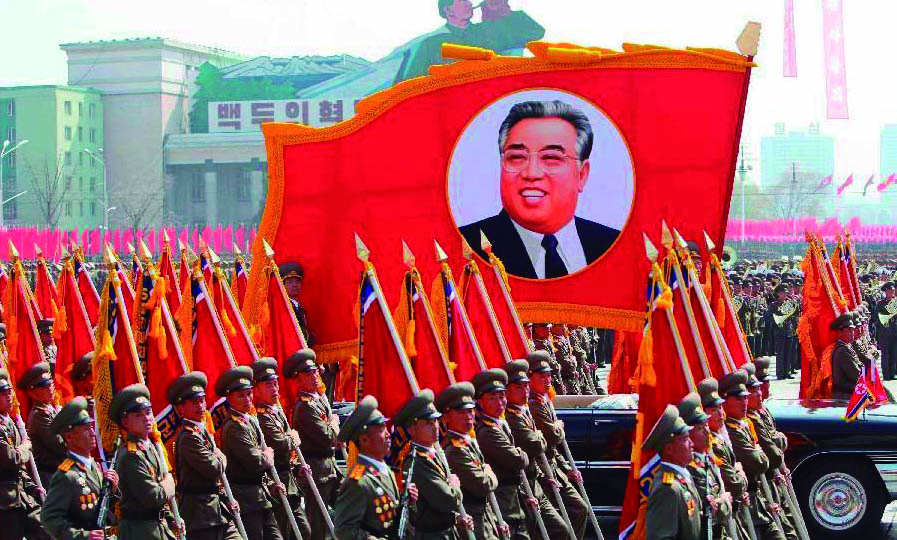
Juche Ideology

Internationalization of Juche ran through the International Institute of the Juche Idea and national or regional study bodies. In Africa, continental and sub-regional committees convened affiliated "Juche Study Centers", shared curricula and translations, and co-sponsored delegations to Pyongyang.

The first African study circle formed in Mali on 15 April 1969. One famous later example was a Pan-African seminar on the Juche Idea in Sierra Leone in 1972, discussing self-reliant development, rural mobilization, and cultural identity in post-colonial state-building. Typical participants included civil servants, ruling-party cadres, youth-league organizers, trade-union and student leaders, journalists, and lecturers. Format of the courses included lectures, film screenings, curated factory and farm visits in Pyongyang, and public exhibitions hosted by embassies and study centers.

== Cultural and technical cooperation ==
Alongside its political outreach, DPRK engaged African nations through widespread non-military collaborations, including sectors in healthcare, agriculture, and infrastructure. From the late 1970s onwards, this cooperation increasingly featured construction projects, with state-run DPRK design studios and art troupes taking on high-profile building and monument work. Its Mansudae Overseas Projects delivered paid monument and public-building contracts abroad, especially in Africa, acting as a key component of Pyongyang’s "monument diplomacy". From the early 1980s, Mansudae groups undertook commemoration works, museums, and public building projects for new African governments. National Heroes’ Acre in Harare was commissioned by the Government of Zimbabwe and inaugurated in 1982. Similar projects later appeared in Senegal and Namibia.

== Legacy ==
Since the 1990s, DPRK-African ties shifted from revolutionary solidarity to pragmatic state-to-state engagement and then contracted under economic stress and UN sanctions. Symbolic politics and elite-level connections have continued, though at smaller scale.

After the Cold War, large memorials and public buildings were still being executed by Mansudae Overseas Projects. Examples include National Heroes’ Acre (Zimbabwe), state monuments and public buildings in Namibia, leadership statues in Mozambique, and the African Renaissance Monument (Senegal). They became commercial revenues and later drew scrutiny under UN sanctions.

After the 2016–2017 sanctions, engaging with North Korea brought compliance risks to African countries. Several governments wound down contracts with DPRK firms and curtailed the size of North Korean workers and technicians. Nevertheless, UN Panel of Experts reported in 2017 that DPRK entities were still using African partnerships (training, construction, and arms supply) to evade sanctions.

== Media and primary sources ==
- International Institute of the Juche Idea (IIJI): publications, newsletters, and activity notes from global and African Juche study bodies.
- IIJI Newsletter: report on the 2013 "Seminar on the Independence of Africa and study of the Juche Idea".
- East–West Center: "Monumental Relationship – North Korea and Namibia" (background on construction diplomacy and sanctions-era scrutiny).

Off-wiki images and collections (external media)

External images
- Celebrations of Korea’s liberation from Japanese rule
- Alleged North Korean military traffic controller in Namibia
- Julius Nyerere and Kim Il Sung greeting actors after Song of Paradise at Mansudae Art Theater (Rodong Sinmun, 28 March 1981)
- DPRK–Zimbabwe relations imagery (18 April 1980)
- Collection: scans of DPRK printed materials and links to Mansudae films/music
- Essay with photographs: “Mansudae Master Class — The Monumental Gifts from North Korea”

== See also ==
- Foreign relations of North Korea
- Non-Aligned Movement
- Mansudae Overseas Projects
