= Argentieri =

Argentieri is an Italian surname. Notable people with the surname include:

- Federigo Argentieri (born 1953), Italian historian
- Mino Argentieri (1927–2017), Italian film critic and cinema historian
