= State House, Windhoek =

Official residence of the President of Namibia

State House of Namibia
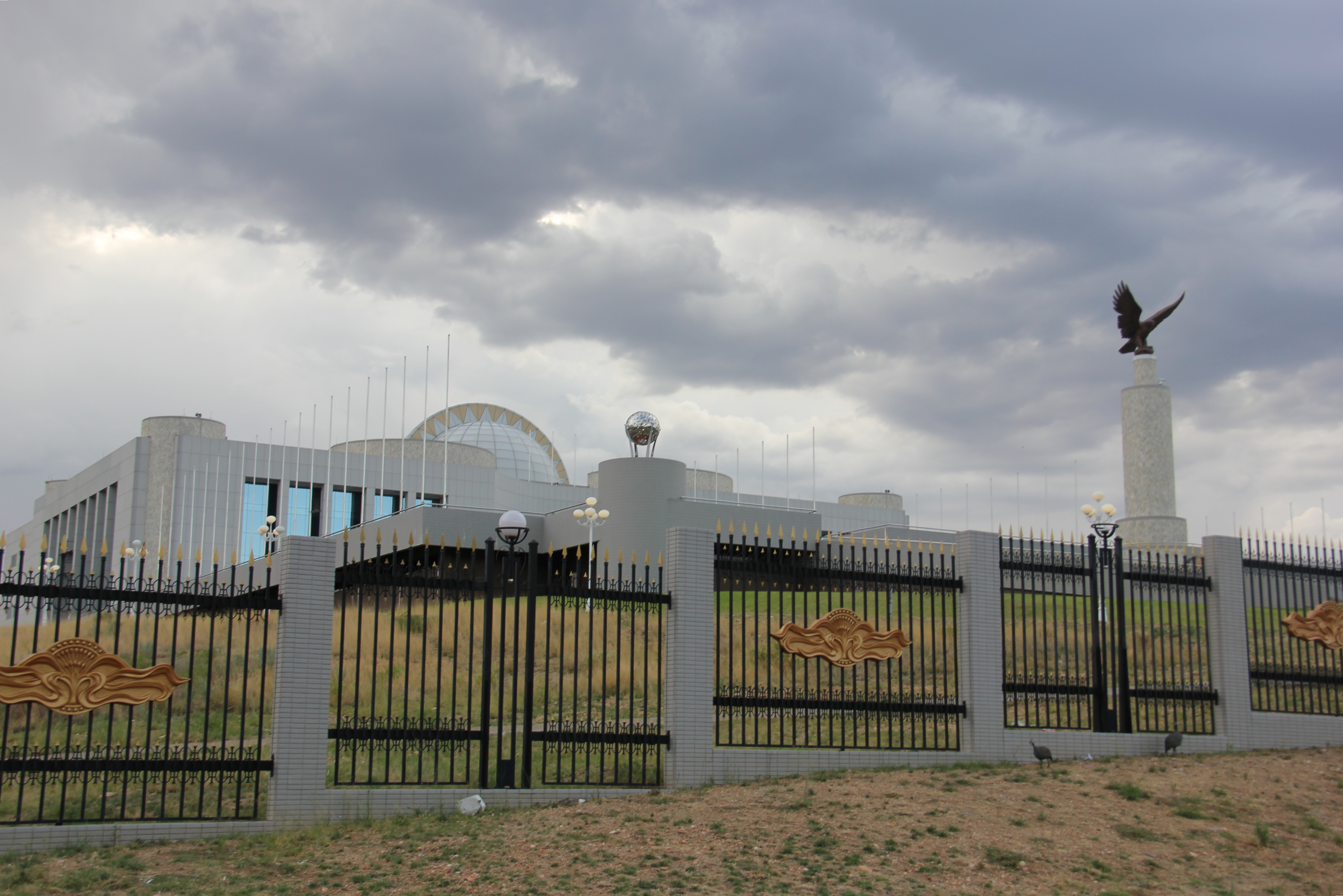
- State House of Namibia
- Interactive map of the State House of Namibia area
- Alternative names: New State House, State House

General information
- Location: Windhoek, Namibia
- Coordinates: 22.5913°S 17.1011°E
- Construction started: 2002
- Inaugurated: 21 March 2008

Design and construction
- Architecture firm: Mansudae Overseas Projects

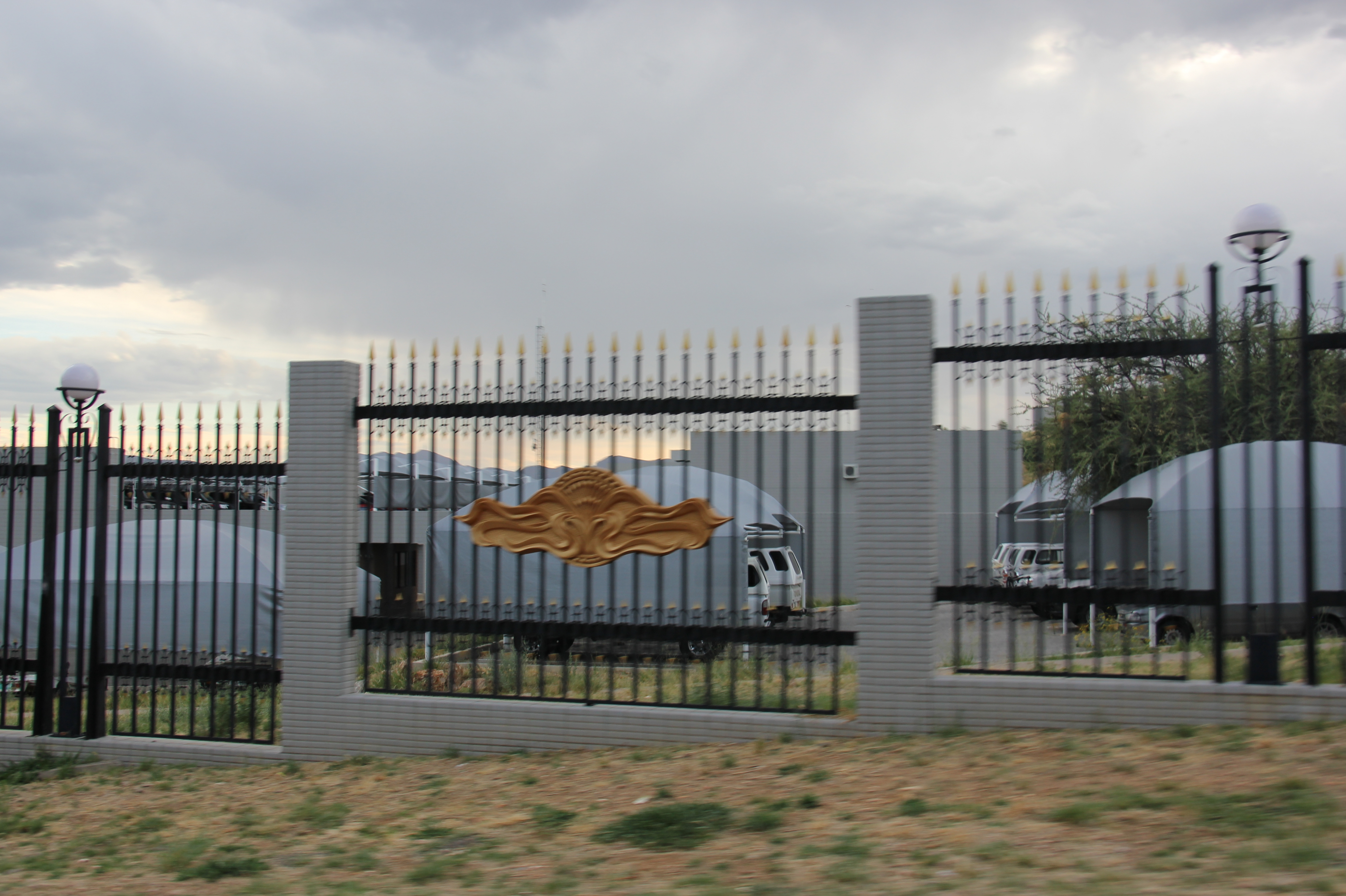
Fence around State House

The State House of the Republic of Namibia is the official residence and workplace of the President of Namibia.

Located in the Auasblick suburb of Windhoek, the State House was constructed by Mansudae Overseas Projects of North Korea from September 2002 to March 2008, a total of 66 months. It is one of four major public works projects Mansudae constructed in Namibia, the other three being Heroes' Acre, Okahandja Military Museum and the Independence Memorial Museum.

The administrative building cost 400 million Namibian dollars.

== History ==
The State House was designed by the North Korean company Mansudae Overseas Projects and built over a period of 66 months. In September 2002, at the end of his term, Sam Nujoma, the first president of Namibia, had construction begin on the new building, to replace the old State House in the inner city, because both the office space in the old State House and the parking area were inadequate.

On 21 March 2008, the Namibian President opened Hifikepunye Pohamba's house in the presence of Kim Yong-nam, chairman of the Presidium of the Supreme People's Assembly of North Korea, and the Cuban General Leopoldo Cintra Frias. Since the presidential residence was initially not finished completely, the Cabinet Secretary had to commute between the Old State House and the new building. On 2 September 2008, the first Cabinet meeting was held. On 4 June 2010, the president officially moved to the new presidential residence.

According to unofficial estimates, the construction cost was between 413.2 million and 600 million Namibian dollars. Forty Namibian subcontractors and suppliers were involved in the project. Another 100 Namibians were working on the project.

== Structure of the complex ==
The site covers 25 hectares and is fenced off by a two-kilometer long steel fence. At each corner of the fence, there are darkened glass towers and large guard rooms

The administrative area consists of the Office of the President, the offices of cabinet members and 200 president staff offices. Separate from the office block, are a guest house for visiting heads of state, two apartments for more state visitors, as well as the residence of the president. Other buildings are garages and accommodation for police forces and security personnel. Opposite the main gate on the other side of the road are two helipads. Scattered on the park-like grounds are animal replicas (e.g. kudu and elephants) made of copper.

In the entrance hall is a painting of the members of the first Namibian cabinet, including Sam Nujoma, Hifikepunye Pohamba, Hage Geingob, Theo-Ben Gurirab, Ben Amathila, Libertina Amathila, Hidipo Hamutenya and Gert Hanekom. At the door to the two-storey entrance hall, a wood carving shows a representation of women from all ethnic groups in the country. On the opposite wall at this level there is a large painting of the Epupa Falls, painted in 2005 by a Korean artist.

== Old State House ==
The Old State House is located on Robert Mugabe Avenue in the Windhoek Central Business District, near the Christ Church. Because of its central location and close proximity to nearby buildings, expansion was not possible, so the new State House had to be built.

On 20 July 2010, the cabinet decided that the old state house would be used as the residence and office of the Prime Minister of Namibia.
