= Hochland Park =

Coordinates: 22°34′26″S 17°04′01″E

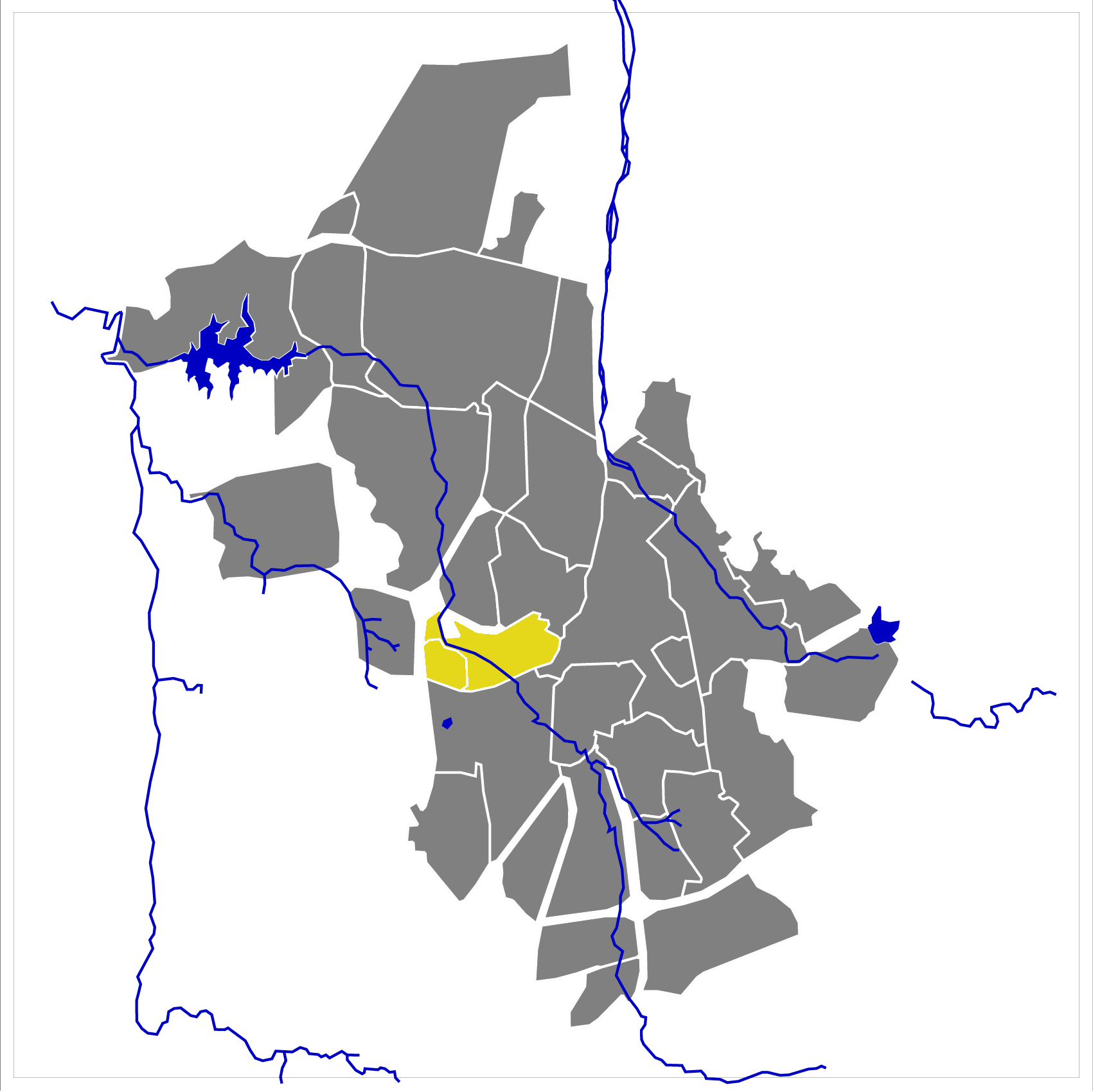
Hochland Park (yellow) within the City of Windhoek (grey)

Hochland Park (also Hochlandpark, seldom Highland Park) is a residential suburb in Windhoek, the capital of Namibia. It is named after the German Khomas Hochland, the central-Namibian plateau area in which Windhoek is situated.

Hochland Park is situated adjacent to the city centre and borders the suburbs of Tauben Glen and Acacia in the east, Dorado Park in the north, Windhoek West in the west and Pioneers Park in the south. Originally designed as a whites-only area it is today an affluent residential area for Windhoek's upper middle class, both black and white.

== History and political importance ==
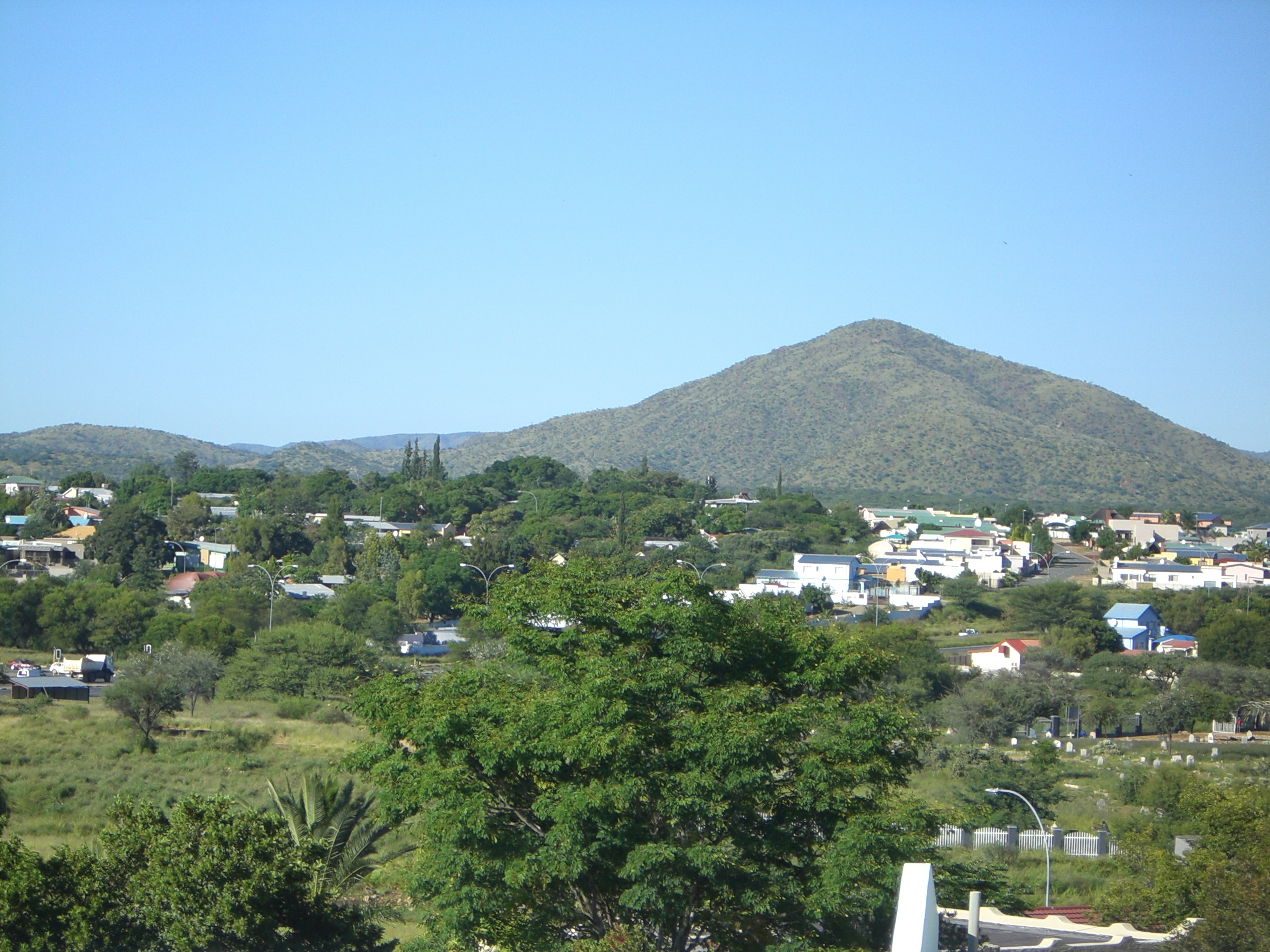
View from Hochland Park onto the Old Location Cemetery Museum (lower right corner) and parts of the suburb Pionierspark

Hochland Park was established in the late 1960s at the place where Windhoek's Old Location, a township for black residents, used to be. Blacks were evicted from this township by force when central Windhoek grew too close to the area. A new township, Katutura, was established far away from the city centre.

The eviction faced severe resistance by the black community. On December 10, 1959, apartheid police attacked a protest gathering, killing 11 people and wounding 44. This day became known as the "Old Location uprising". It was one of the events leading to the foundation of SWAPO by forcing community leaders from the Ovamboland People's Organization into exile, among them Sam Nujoma, who later became Namibia's founding president. The Old Location uprising is the reason for the declaration of December 10, Human Rights Day, as a Namibian national holiday.

In 1968 the Old Location was officially closed and whites began to settle. Today, blacks who participated in the liberation struggle and became economically successful after independence often make a political statement by taking up residence in Hochland Park, the area they had been chased away from by the whites. Many ministers and high government officials and the inspector-general of the Namibian police today live in Hochland Park.

== People from Hochland Park ==
- Angelika Muharukua, former governor of Kunene Region resided here.
- McHenry Venaani, president of the Popular Democratic Movement (PDM) formerly known as the Democratic Turnhalle Alliance

== Street names ==
Street names in Hochland Park are named after birds, just like in the adjacent suburbs of Tauben Glen and Acacia, reflecting the languages spoken by the white community at the time of the establishment of the suburb. Approximately a third of them are English (Goshawk Street, Kingfisher Road), Afrikaans (Hamerkopweg, Kestrell Straat), and German (Raben Road, Falkenweg), respectively.

== See also ==
- History of Namibia
