= Okahandja Military Museum =

Military museum in Okahandja, central Namibia

Coordinates: 21.98085°S 16.91644°E

Okahandja Military Museum is a military museum located in Okahandja, Namibia, which was supposed to exhibit a collection of military memorabilia from Namibia's history.

The museum was built in 2004, but in 2008 it was reported to be still not open to the public, and armed guards would not let people visit or take photographs. As of 2022, the museum remained closed to the public.

Costing US$4-5 million, the museum was built by Mansudae Overseas Projects; the company also demolished the former German police station that once stood there. It was one of four major public works the company constructed in Namibia; the other three being Heroes' Acre, a new State House and the Independence Memorial Museum.
