= Rider without a Horse =

2008 Namibian short film directed by Tim Huebschle

- Directed by: Tim Huebschle
- Screenplay by: Tim Huebschle; Jana von Hase
- Produced by: Tim Huebschle; Jana von Hase; Leo Phiri
- Starring: Friedrich-Wilhelm Prozinsky; Howarth Katambo
- Cinematography: Horst Zaire; Alexander Honisch
- Edited by: Tim Huebschle
- Music by: Christian Polloni
- Production company: Collective Productions Namibia
- Release date: April 16, 2009
- Running time: 12 minutes
- Country: Namibia
- Languages: English, German, Afrikaans

Rider without a Horse is a Namibian short film directed by Tim Huebschle in 2008.

== Plot ==
Namibia celebrates its 18th Independence anniversary. The 100-year-old Rider Monument (Reiterdenkmal) comes to life. The rider is confronted with what he stands for and decides to change that.

== Production notes ==
After the film's initial release in April 2009, director Tim Huebschle filmed some more documentary shots during the removal of the Reiterdenkmal in August 2009 which were subsequently edited into the end credits of the film.

The screenplay was written in 2008 amidst the political debate of what to do with the controversial German colonial Reiterdenkmal. Rider without a Horse received a production grant from the now defunct Berlin-Windhoek arts organization p.ART.ners.

== Cast ==
- Friedrich-Wilhelm Prozinsky as Reiter
- Howarth Katambo as Herero Field Marshall
