= Mansudae Overseas Projects =

North Korean monument construction company

- Hangul: 만수대해외개발회사
- Hanja: 萬壽臺海外開發會社
- Lit.: Mansudae Overseas Development Company
- RR: Mansudae haeoe gaebal hoesa
- MR: Mansudae haeoe kaebal hoesa

Mansudae Overseas Projects (Korean: 만수대해외개발회사) is a construction company based in Jongphyong-dong, Phyongchon District, Pyongyang, North Korea. It is the international commercial division of the Mansudae Art Studio. As of August 2011, it had earned an estimated US$160 million overseas building monuments and memorials. As of 2015, Mansudae projects have been built in 17 countries: Angola, Algeria, Benin, Botswana, Cambodia, Chad, the Democratic Republic of the Congo, Egypt, Equatorial Guinea, Ethiopia, Germany, Malaysia, Mali, Mozambique, Namibia, Senegal, Togo and Zimbabwe. The company uses North Korean artists, engineers, and construction workers. Their sculptures, monuments, and buildings are in the style of North Korean socialist realism.

== Notable works ==
The African Renaissance Monument in Dakar, Senegal, was created by Mansudae Overseas Projects.

Mansudae Overseas Projects is responsible for various monuments across Africa. They constructed the President Agostinho Neto Cultural Centre in Luanda, Angola, a statue of Béhanzin in Benin, the Three Dikgosi Monument in Botswana, a statue of Laurent-Désiré Kabila in the Democratic Republic of the Congo, the Tiglachin Monument in Addis Ababa, Ethiopia, the Samora Machel Statue in Maputo, Mozambique, and four public works in Namibia: the Heroes' Acre (inaugurated August 2002), the Okahandja Military Museum (inaugurated 2004), the State House of Namibia (inaugurated 2008), and the Independence Memorial Museum (inaugurated 2014).

In Senegal, the company built the African Renaissance Monument. Mansudae Overseas Project also constructed the National Heroes' Acre in Zimbabwe, which closely mirrors the design of the Revolutionary Martyrs' Cemetery in Taesong-guyŏk. Also in Zimbabwe, the statue of Joshua Nkomo was constructed by the company.

In Cambodia, the Angkor Panorama Museum was built next to the temples of Angkor. The museum was operated jointly by APSARA and Mansudae, with about half of 40 staff members being from North Korea. In 2020, the museum was closed indefinitely due to international sanctions.

Mansudae also worked on the reconstruction of the Fairy Tale Fountain in Frankfurt, Germany, an art nouveau relic from 1910 that had been melted down for its metal during World War II. Germany is the only western nation to have a North Korean-built structure.
