= Reiterdenkmal =

Former public statue in Windhoek, Namibia

Equestrian Monument
- Reiterdenkmal; Südwester Reiter
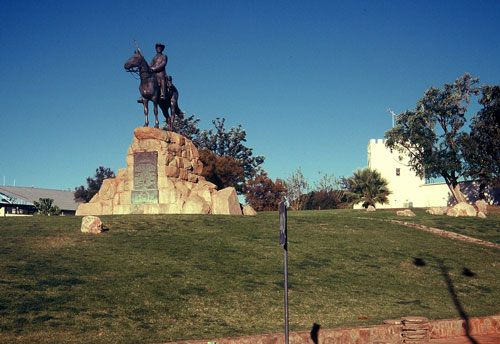
- The Reiterdenkmal at its old Place
- Interactive map of Equestrian Monument
- Location: Windhoek, Namibia
- Coordinates: 22°34′07″S 17°05′16″E
- Designer: Adolf Kürle
- Type: Monument
- Material: Bronze and granite
- Height: 9.5 metres (31 ft)
- Dedicated date: 27 January 1912
- Dedicated to: German soldiers and civilians that died in the Herero and Nama genocide
- Dismantled date: 2013

The Equestrian Monument, more commonly known under its German original name Reiterdenkmal and the name Südwester Reiter (Rider of South West), was a monument in Windhoek, the capital of Namibia. It was inaugurated on 27 January 1912, the birthday of German emperor Wilhelm II. The monument honoured German soldiers and civilians who died during the Herero and Nama genocide of 1904–1908, which later caused controversy in independent Namibia due to the monument’s association with German colonial rule.

The monument was unmounted in 2009 at its original location opposite the Christuskirche in central Windhoek, and in 2010 re-erected a few metres away in front of the Alte Feste. After public controversy did not cease, it was removed altogether in 2013. The bronze statue is currently in storage in the courtyard of the Alte Feste.

== Creation and erection ==
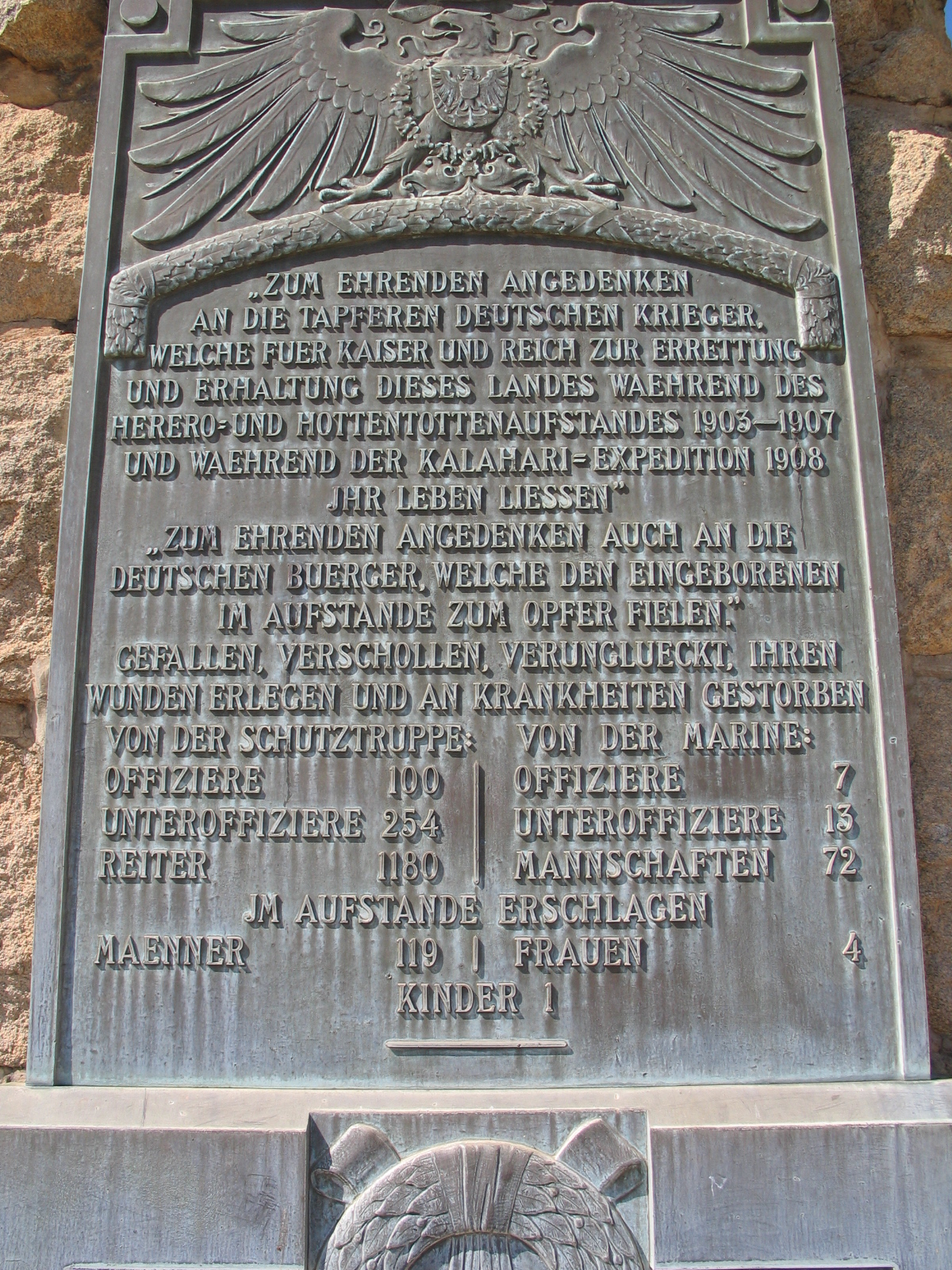
Monument inscription in German. (Only the German losses are counted here.)

The Reiterdenkmal was financed privately and designed by Berlin sculptor Adolf Kürle. The equestrian statue is 4.5 metres (15 ft) tall and made from bronze. It was created in Berlin and shipped to German South West Africa in 1911. After its arrival in Swakopmund, it was transported by train to Windhoek. The plinth is 5 metres (16 ft) tall and consists of approximately 180 granite rocks from Okahandja. It has a plaque mounted on it that remembers the German soldiers and civilians that died in the Herero and Nama Wars of 1904–1908, as well as in the Kalahari Expedition in 1908. The translation of the inscription is:

Remembering and honouring the brave German warriors that died for emperor and empire to save and protect this land during the Herero and Hottentot uprisings between 1903 and 1907, and during the Kalahari Expedition in 1908. Also remembering and honouring German citizens that died from the hands of the indigenous. Fallen, missing, died from accident, succumbed to their injuries or sickness: Of the Protection Force: 100 officers, 254 non-commissioned officers, 1180 soldiers, of the marine: 7 officers, 13 non-commissioned officers, 27 seamen. Killed during the uprising: 119 men, 4 women, 1 child.

German South West African Governor Theodor Seitz inaugurated the monument on the 53rd birthday of German emperor Wilhelm II on 27 January 1912.

Although the monument is unusual in that it displays a corporal on horseback, Namibian historian Andreas Vogt incorrectly claimed that nowhere else in the world is an ordinary soldier sculpted in that manner and that the honour of being displayed on a horse is only extended to "highest nobility like emperors, kings and princes". German historian Joachim Zeller points out that traditionally equestrian statues symbolise imperial rule and power, and that this is how the function of the Reiterdenkmal has to be interpreted.

== Status ==
The monument was erected not only to remember the dead but also was intended to serve as symbol of victory and a claim to rightful possession of South West African land. Elke Zuern, Professor of Politics at Sarah Lawrence College, writes:

"Memorials and commemorations offer stylized presentations of the past. [...] They can also have profound political meaning by visibly presenting victor’s justice and offering a warning to those who might continue to resist. The Equestrian Monument in Windhoek served exactly this function. Standing next to the German colonial fort and on the site of a wartime concentration camp, it was erected by the German colonial masters as a symbol of the longevity of their rule."

That political function of the Reiterdenkmal became obsolete within three years. World War I broke out, and in 1915 German South West Africa was overrun and the Schutztruppe surrendered. Germany lost all of its colonies after the war. Between the two World Wars, the German war graveyard at Waterberg and the Reiterdenkmal were the two most important sites for war remembrance and mourning celebrations of the German minority in South West Africa.

The monument also served as brand for German rule in Africa and was used for propaganda during the Third Reich. Books and movies featured pictures of it. In 1969, during the Apartheid era, it was declared a national monument by the South African administration.

== Controversies ==
The Reiterdenkmal has long been controversial. Its continued display of German superiority, as well as its one-sided reporting on the deaths in the first decade of the 20th century although Herero and Damara people lost fifty times as many lives as the Germans during the Herero and Nama genocide, have attracted critical commentary, particularly since the 1980s.

In 1959, a few days after the Old Location Uprising in which 11 people were killed, unknown Herero activists covered the rider's head with a linen bag and decorated the rest of the statue with flowers as a "protest against the atrocities of the white South African minority regime". After Namibia gained independence in 1990, white citizens of German descent feared that the statue would be destroyed, but that was not a priority of the SWAPO government, which preferred to build its own memorial sites to remember the independence struggle.

Several other actions demonstrating the controversies around the monuments were performed in 2008. In July, 51 wooden crosses were erected around the statue, bearing names and expressions in Otjiherero, and in October, a Namibian flag was inserted into the rider's rifle barrel. Each action caused the discussion about status and justification of a monument glorifying German colonialism to flare up again in the local media.

In 2001, the Cabinet of Namibia unanimously decided to build an Independence Museum at the site opposite the Christuskirche, at the place the Equestrian Monument stood. The removal of the statue was explicitly endorsed.

In 2009, construction of the museum began, the monument was wrapped, disassembled, and stored at a warehouse. The storage place was kept secret to avoid attracting vandals and memorabilia collectors. Private donors financed the move, as it was feared that the statue would otherwise be destroyed. The same year the short film Rider without a Horse came out, addressing the changing public perception of the statue's relevance.

In 2010, the monument was re-erected in front of the Alte Feste, but discussions on its role in an independent Namibia did not cease. The National Heritage Council advertised the suggested deproclamation as National Monument on 20 December 2013 and gave the public 60 days to register objections. Only a few days into the period, on 25 December 2013, the area in front of Alte Feste was cordoned off to prevent the public and the press from getting too close. Police Inspector-General Sebastian Ndeitunga confirmed that it was to be removed again, and the statue was lifted off its plinth in the evening of the same day and transported into the yard of Alte Feste for storage.
