= John Cabot University =

Private university in Rome, Italy

- Seal of John Cabot University
- Motto: Explorando Excello
- Type: Private university
- Established: 1972
- President: Antonia Maioni
- Students: 1,882 (Fall 2025)
- Location: Rome, Italy; 41.892787°N 12.468341°E
- Campus: Urban
- Language: English
- Colors: Blue and White
- Nickname: JCU Gladiators
- Mascot: Maximus the Gladiator
- Website: www.johncabot.edu

John Cabot University (JCU) is a private American university in Rome, Italy. The university offers undergraduate degrees, graduate degrees, and study abroad programs taught in English to an international student body representing over 80 countries.

== History ==
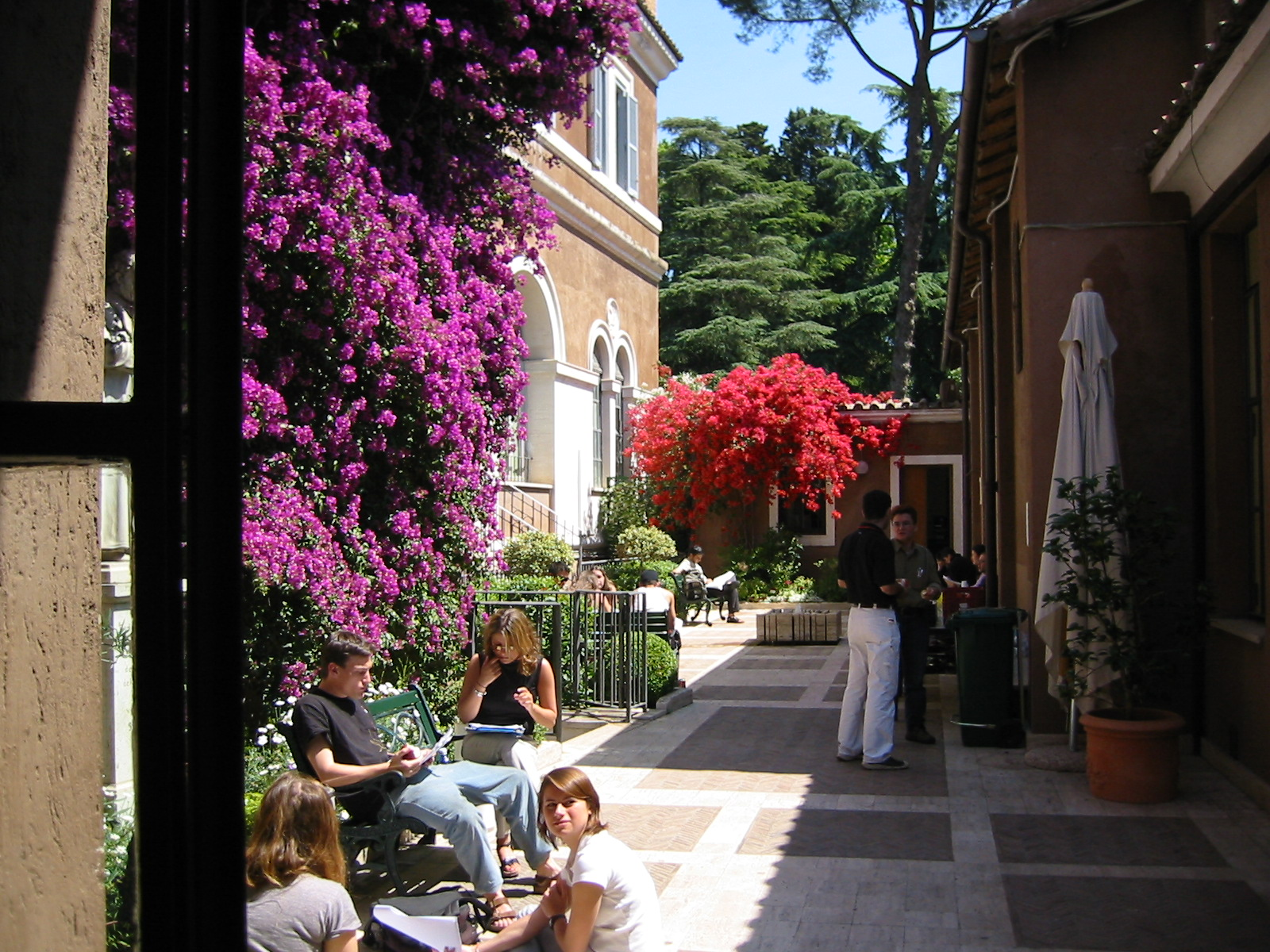
A view of the Guarini Campus

The college was founded in 1972 and it was originally located within a religious school called Pro Deo University (now Luiss University). It was named after the Italian explorer John Cabot (Giovanni Caboto), whose 1497 voyage to North America contributed to European exploration of the continent.

By 1978, most students at John Cabot were business majors, though some were earning Associate of Arts degrees. Between 1985 and 1991, the university expanded and created programs in art history, international affairs, and English literature. It was formerly academically associated with Hiram College in Hiram, Ohio. In 1991, the school became an independent university under the name John Cabot University and became accredited in 2003, thus endings its affiliation program with Hiram. The library moved, expanded, and was dedicated to benefactors Paul and Maxine Frohring in 1999. The business school was established in 2018 In 2026, John Cabot University was included in the Forbes article "15 Top International Colleges for U.S. Undergraduate Students."

== Campus ==
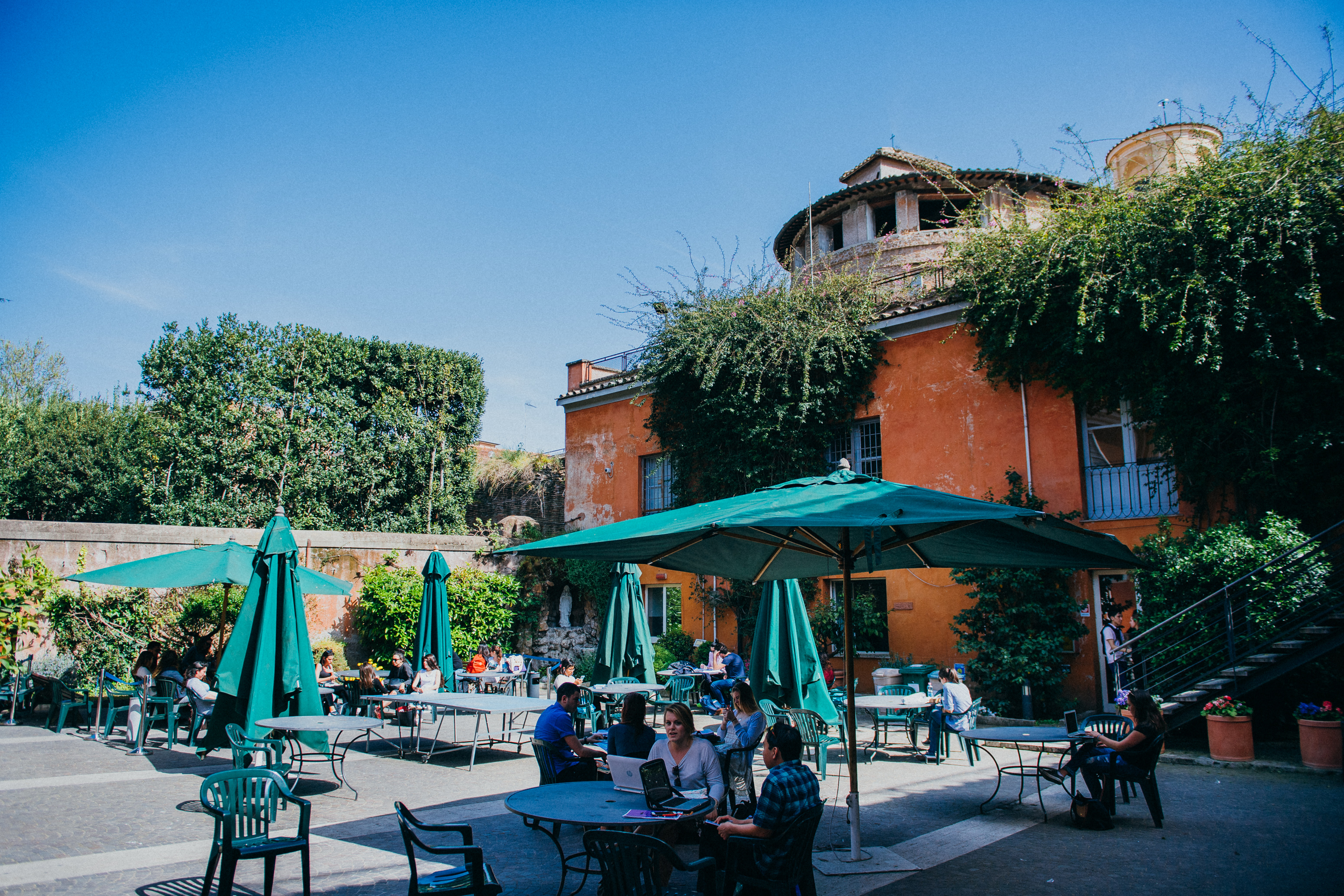
The courtyard of the Guarini Campus

The university's campuses are located in the Trastevere neighborhood of central Rome and include the Frank J. Guarini Campus, the Frohring Campus, the Caroline Critelli Guarini Campus, and the Franco Pavoncello Campus. The campuses are situated within walking distance of one another near the Tiber and several of Rome's historic landmarks.

The Frank J. Guarini Campus, the university's main campus, occupies a former convent and features a three-story building surrounding terraces and courtyards. The campus houses classrooms, administrative offices, media production facilities, study areas, the Frohring Library, and the Aula Magna Regina auditorium, the university's principal lecture hall. The Frohring Campus, located along the Tiber, contains classrooms, student services offices, and the university cafeteria. The Caroline Critelli Guarini Campus, the university's first owned property, houses classrooms, administrative offices, and laboratory facilities.

The Franco Pavoncello Campus contains specialized facilities for studio art and design, including studios for printmaking, painting, design, and photography, as well as a lighting studio, darkroom, computer laboratories, a screening room, and student services offices. The university also operates the Trastevere Art Studios, which provide additional facilities for art, design, and digital fabrication.

Additional university facilities include the center for graduate studies and Il Foglio building, which houses tutoring and academic support services. Student housing is provided through the Gianicolo Residence, located near the main campus, as well as additional university-managed residences and apartments in the Trastevere area.

=== Frohring Library ===
The Frohring Library is located in the Guarini Campus. The library's collections include approximately 35,000 print volumes and 4,000 DVDs. In addition, its electronic collections count a total of 630,000 e-books and periodicals. In 2015, the library became the first institution in Italy to implement WorldShare Management Services (WMS).

== Academics ==
John Cabot University is accredited by the Middle States Commission on Higher Education. It awards American degrees under a license from the Delaware Department of Education.

=== Organization ===
The university has 11 academic departments, covering art and design; art history; business administration; communication and media studies; economics; English language and literature; history and humanities; mathematics, natural, and applied sciences; modern languages and literature; political science and international affairs; and psychology and social sciences.

The Frank J. Guarini School of Business is made up of the departments of business administration and economics, the institute for entrepreneurship, and the center for continuing and professional education. It has been accredited by the Association to Advance Collegiate Schools of Business since 2022.

=== Undergraduate programs ===
As of 2026, the university offers 16 undergraduate degree programs and 25 minors. Following the American model, undergraduate courses last four years and the university uses US credit hours rather than ECTS credits.

The university also offers study abroad programs to around 1,300 students annually from other universities, either through partner universities (primarily in the US) or by direct application for independent study-abroad students.

=== Graduate programs ===
At the graduate level, the university offers two Master of Arts degrees, in art history and in international affairs.

== Student Life ==
The JCU student population as of September 2025 was just over 1,880, composed of about 60% degree-seeking students (undergraduate and graduate) and 40% visiting students. Graduate students made up around 3% of the total. The largest number of undergraduate degree-seeking students came from Italy (49%) followed by the US (26%), with the rest of Europe contributing 12% and the rest of the world 13%, while 95% of visiting students came from the US and 5% from 22 other countries.

=== Athletics ===
JCU athletics offers varsity sports, including men's and women's basketball, coed volleyball, men's and women's soccer, cheerleading, coed padel and coed tennis, competing in the Rome Universities Championships. The JCU fitness center is located inside the Gianicolo Residence Hall.

JCU's athletics teams are known as the Gladiators and are represented by their mascot Maximus the Gladiator.

== Notable people ==
=== Alumni ===
- Ali Reza Arabnia – Entrepreneur and industrialist
- Mia Ceran – Journalist and television presenter
- Eva Maydell (née Paunova) – Member of the European Parliament
- Beatrice Vio – Paralympic athlete
- Eleonora Brown – Film actress
- Vangelis Haritatos – Businessman and politician
- Nicola Brandt – Artist working in photography, film and installation

=== Faculty ===
- Federigo Argentieri – political scientist specializing in Eastern Europe
- Stefan Lorenz Sorgner – philosopher, expert on transhumanism and posthumanism
