= Alte Feste =

Historic building in Windhoek

Coordinates: 22°34′10″S 17°05′18″E

- Old Fortress
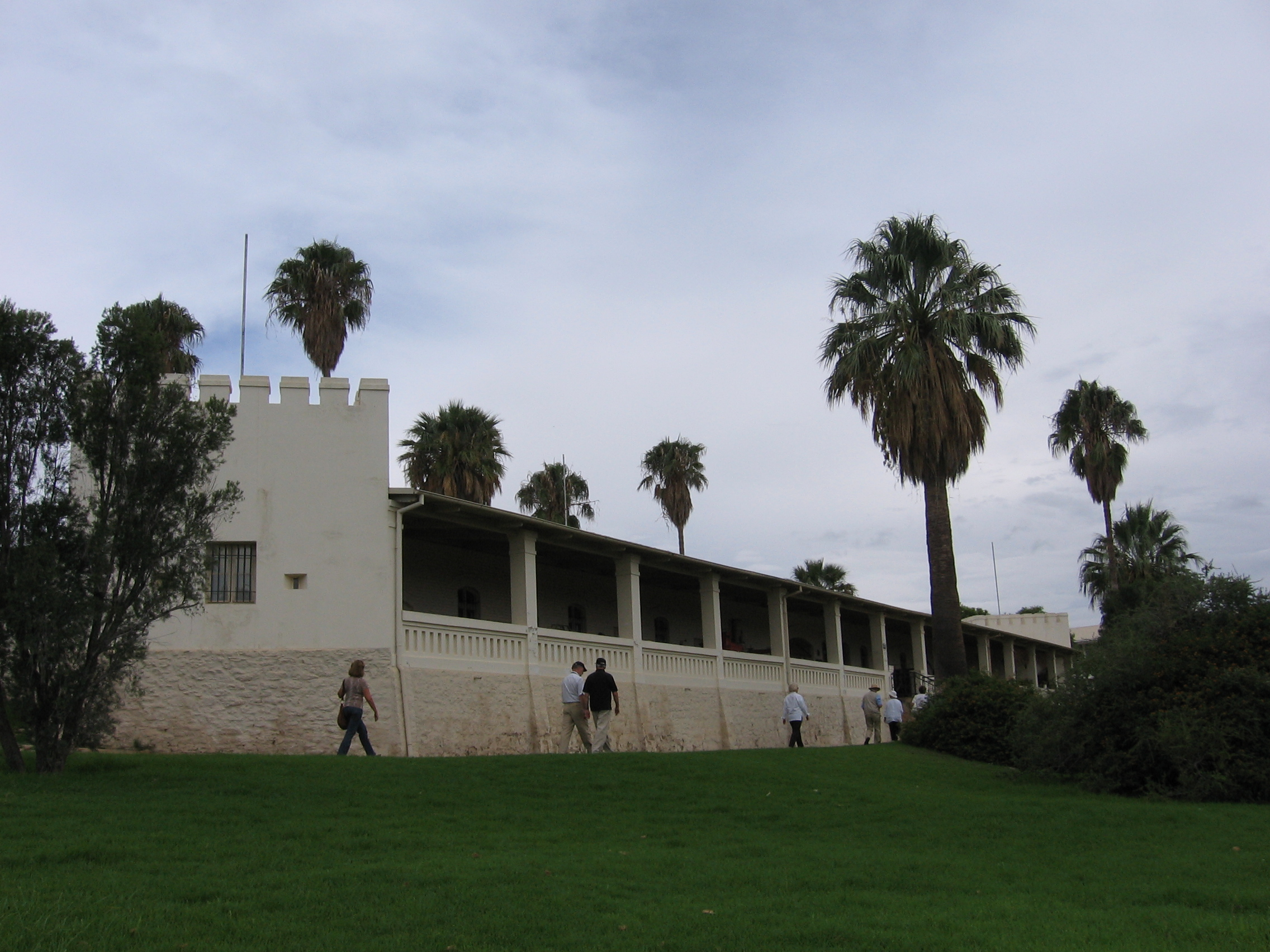
- The Alte Feste in April 2006
- Established: 1890
- Location: Robert Mugabe Avenue, Windhoek, Namibia
- Type: Fortress and museum
- Founder: Captain Curt von François
- Owner: National Museum of Namibia
- Website: National Museum of Namibia

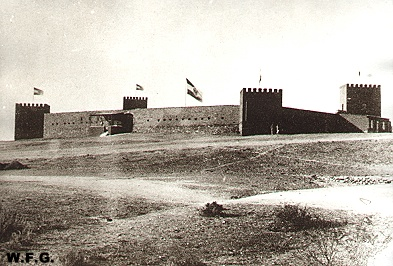
The Alte Feste in 1891

The Alte Feste (English: Old Fortress) is a fortress and museum in downtown Windhoek, the capital of Namibia. It is situated in Robert Mugabe Avenue, next to the Independence Memorial Museum.

== History ==
The building was designed by captain Curt von François, in order to serve as headquarters of the imperial German Schutztruppe (colonial military force), during German colonization of South West Africa. The location of Windhoek, which was deserted and completely destroyed at that time, was chosen because the Germans felt it would serve as a buffer zone between the Nama and Herero tribes. The fort was, however, never involved in any military action.

The foundation was laid on 18 October 1890 by the then Schutztruppe private Gustav Tünschel. The building was redesigned multiple times during the first years; its final layout was only completed in 1915. It consists of an inner courtyard with high walls and accommodation for the troops on the inside, as well as four towers. The Alte Feste is the oldest surviving building in the city which subsequently developed around it.

After the World War I German surrender in South West Africa, Windhoek was occupied by the South African Army in March 1915. The Alte Feste now served as military headquarters for the South African Union troops.

In 1935 the fort was used for a more peaceful purpose when it was converted into a hostel for the adjacent Windhoek High School. Already severely dilapidated, it was declared a National Monument in 1957. The building was renovated extensively in 1963.

In 2010, the Reiterdenkmal, Windhoek's well-known equestrian monument, was placed in front of the Alte Feste. It was removed and placed in storage on Christmas Day in 2013.

== Usage ==
The building today accommodates the historic collection of the National Museum of Namibia. As of 2023 Alte Feste is closed and in urgent need of renovation. After the renovation, the Alte Feste is planned to house a "Center for Arts, Crafts, and Heritage" as well as a National Museum of Genocide and Colonial History. Both institutions will coexist on an equal footing.
