= Independence Memorial Museum (Namibia) =

History museum in Windhoek, Namibia

- The museum in 2017
- Interactive map of the Independence Memorial Museum area

General information
- Type: Historical museum
- Coordinates: 22.5688°S 17.0881°E
- Groundbreaking: 2011
- Inaugurated: 21 March 2014

Height
- Height: 40 metres (130 ft)

Technical details
- Floor count: 5
- Lifts/elevators: 1

Design and construction
- Architecture firm: Mansudae Overseas Projects

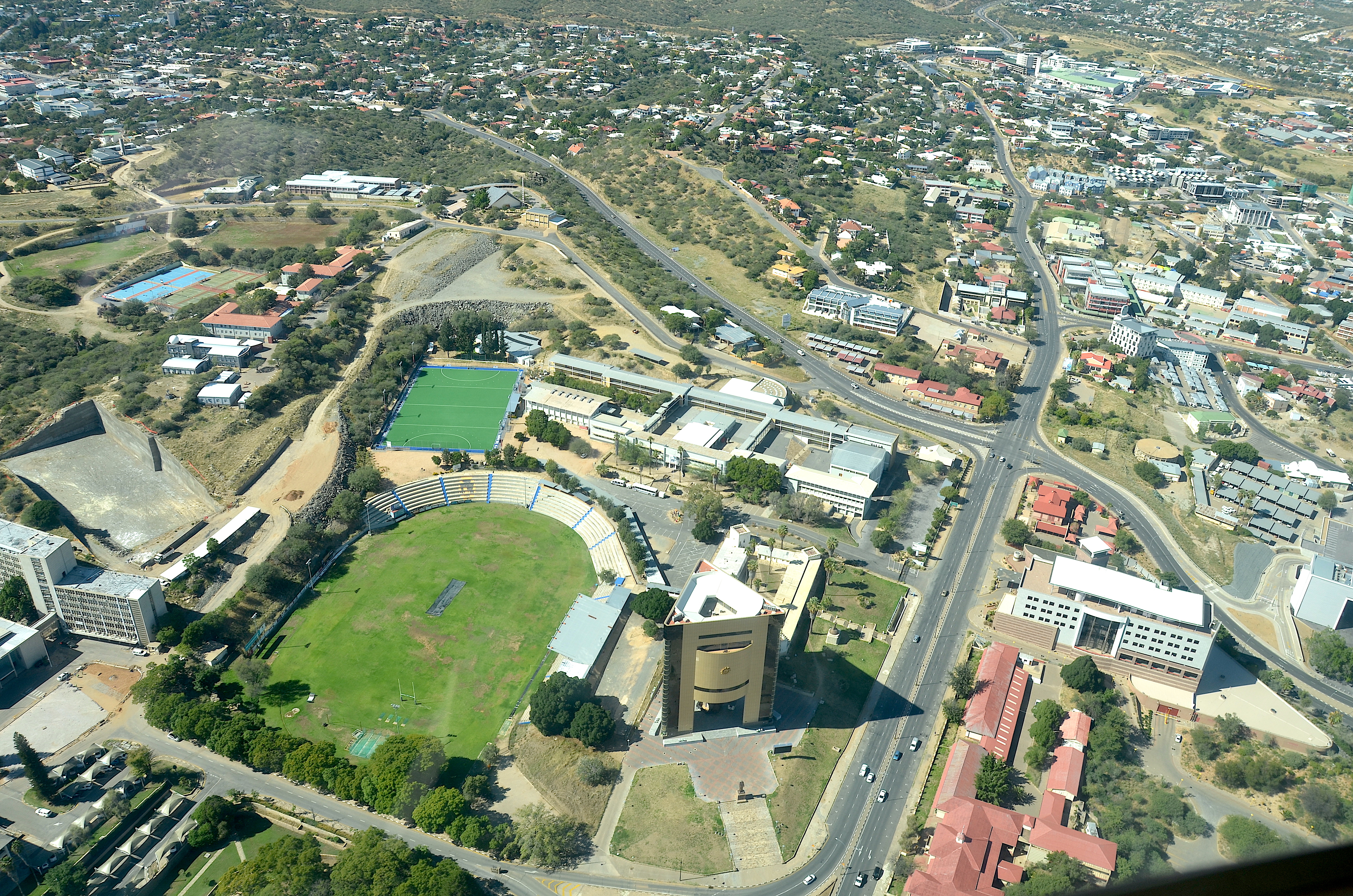
Independence Memorial Museum, Aerial view (2017)

The Independence Memorial Museum is a history museum in Windhoek, the capital of Namibia. It focuses on the anti-colonial resistance and the national liberation movement of Namibia.

The museum is located on Robert Mugabe Avenue and was designed and built by Mansudae Overseas Projects, a North Korean firm. It is one of four major public works Mansudae constructed in Namibia, the other three being Heroes' Acre, Okahandja Military Museum and a new State House.

The museum's appearance has been likened to that of a potjie, as well as a coffee pot and a molar tooth. It is flanked by two statues: a statue of Namibia's first president, Sam Nujoma, and the Genocide Memorial, both also built by Mansudae.

The museum was inaugurated on March 20, 2014, the twenty-fourth anniversary of independence of the country, by President Hifikepunye Pohamba.

== Naming ==
The name of the proposed museum was subject to considerable debate from the time of its proposal. Usutuaije Maamberua, president of South West Africa National Union (SWANU), proposed the name "Genocide Remembrance Centre", in recognition of the site where it was built being known as Orumbo rua Katjombondi, Otjiherero: a place of horror.

== Location ==
The Independence Memorial Museum is located on Robert Mugabe Avenue between two buildings from the German colonial period, the Christuskirche and the colonial citadel, the Alte Feste. The museum sits on a small slope between the two structures, and according to the historian Reihard Kossler, has broken up the ensemble of German monuments in Windhoek. In sharp contrast to the German colonial architectural style of the existing historical structures, the Independence Memorial Museum is built in the North Korean socialist realist style, symbolic of the "modernist, post-colonial state."

== Structure ==
The museum structure consists of a five-story triangular glass structure and was planned with four equal walls of 40 metres (130 ft) reaching a height of at least 40 metres (130 ft). It features a glass-fronted elevator at its front.

=== Exterior ===
==== Sam Nujoma Statue ====
A bronze statue in the North Korean style commemorating Sam Nujoma is placed prominently at the front of the museum. In the statue Nujoma faces towards Windhoek and holds a copy of the Constituency Book, the Constitution of Namibia. It is located on the site of the Reiterdenkmal equestrian statue, which stood on the hill for 102 years. The Reiterdenkmal statue was considered controversial after the independence of Namibia; some in the country viewed it as symbol of colonial oppression. Others, primarily from the German-speaking community in Namibia, saw any alteration of the statue as a violation of the Namibian Heritage Act of 2004, which outlines the procedures to protect national heritage sites in Namibia. The Reiterdenkmal statue was removed in 2013 and is now located in the courtyard of the Alte Feste Museum.

==== Genocide Memorial ====
The Genocide Memorial sits south of the Nujoma statue. It depicts the 'untold hardships and suffering' at the hands of the Schutztruppe, the troops of the German colonial empire during the 1904–07 war. The statue depicts a man and woman in embrace, symbolizing freedom. The couple stand atop a rendering of a traditional Namibian residence. The concrete brick base of the memorial has the inscription "Their Blood Waters Our Freedom" in raised black letters.

=== Interior ===
==== Exhibits ====
The first floor, titled "Colonial Repression", commemorates early resistance leaders of Namibia and the timeline of the country under South African rule. The second floor, titled "Liberation", commemorates the South African Border War and the role of the People's Liberation Army of Namibia (PLAN) during that conflict. The third floor, titled "Road to Independence", details the activities of SWAPO, United Nations Security Council Resolution 435, and includes a viewing platform of the Panoramic Hall of the museum.

==== Restaurant ====
The last floor (fourth floor) accessible by visitors houses a restaurant, known as the NIMMS (National Independence Memorial Museum), from which there are views over the city. The restaurant showcases a broad spectrum of Namibian culture including ornaments, clothing and books. Some of these items are up for sale.
