= Windhoek Public Library =

Coordinates: 22.5639°S 17.08556°E

The Windhoek Public Library is a public library in downtown Windhoek, Namibia. Built in 1925, it is located in Lüderitz Street, sharing a building with the Owela strand of the National Museum of Namibia. From February 2009 to August 2012 the library underwent renovations worth N$ 700,000, which included replacing the carpets with ceramic tiles, adding air conditioning, increasing lighting, and creating a public internet cafe.
