= Statue of Joshua Nkomo =

Monument in Bulawayo, Zimbabwe

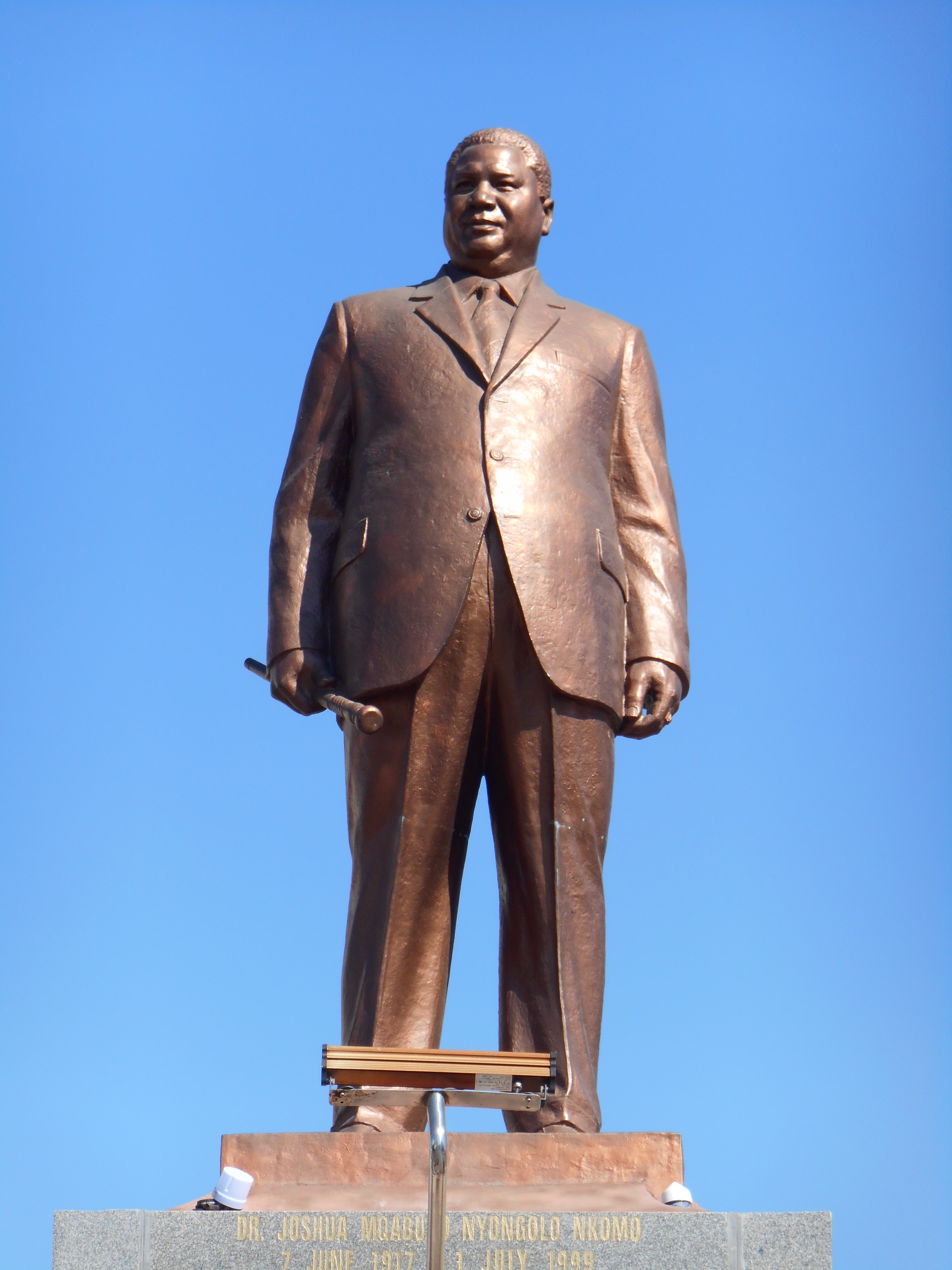
- Artist: Mansudae Art Studio
- Year: 2013
- Type: Bronze
- Location: Bulawayo, CBD; Bulawayo

The statue of Joshua Nkomo is a monument to the Zimbabwean vice president Joshua Nkomo in Bulawayo, Zimbabwe's second largest city.

The bronze statue was produced by the North Korean company Mansudae Art Studio and is erected at the intersection of Joshua Nkomo Street and 8th Avenue. The statue was unveiled 14 years after Nkomo's death on the country's Unity Day (22 December) in 2013, a date that coincided with the signing of the Unity Accord in 1987 between Robert Mugabe and Joshua Nkomo which united the rival ZANU PF and ZAPU parties. On the same day, Main Street was officially renamed to Joshua Mqabuko Nkomo Street and the Joshua Mqabuko Nkomo International Airport Mall was officially opened.

In 2018, free Wi-Fi was installed at the statue for tourists who come to view the monument.

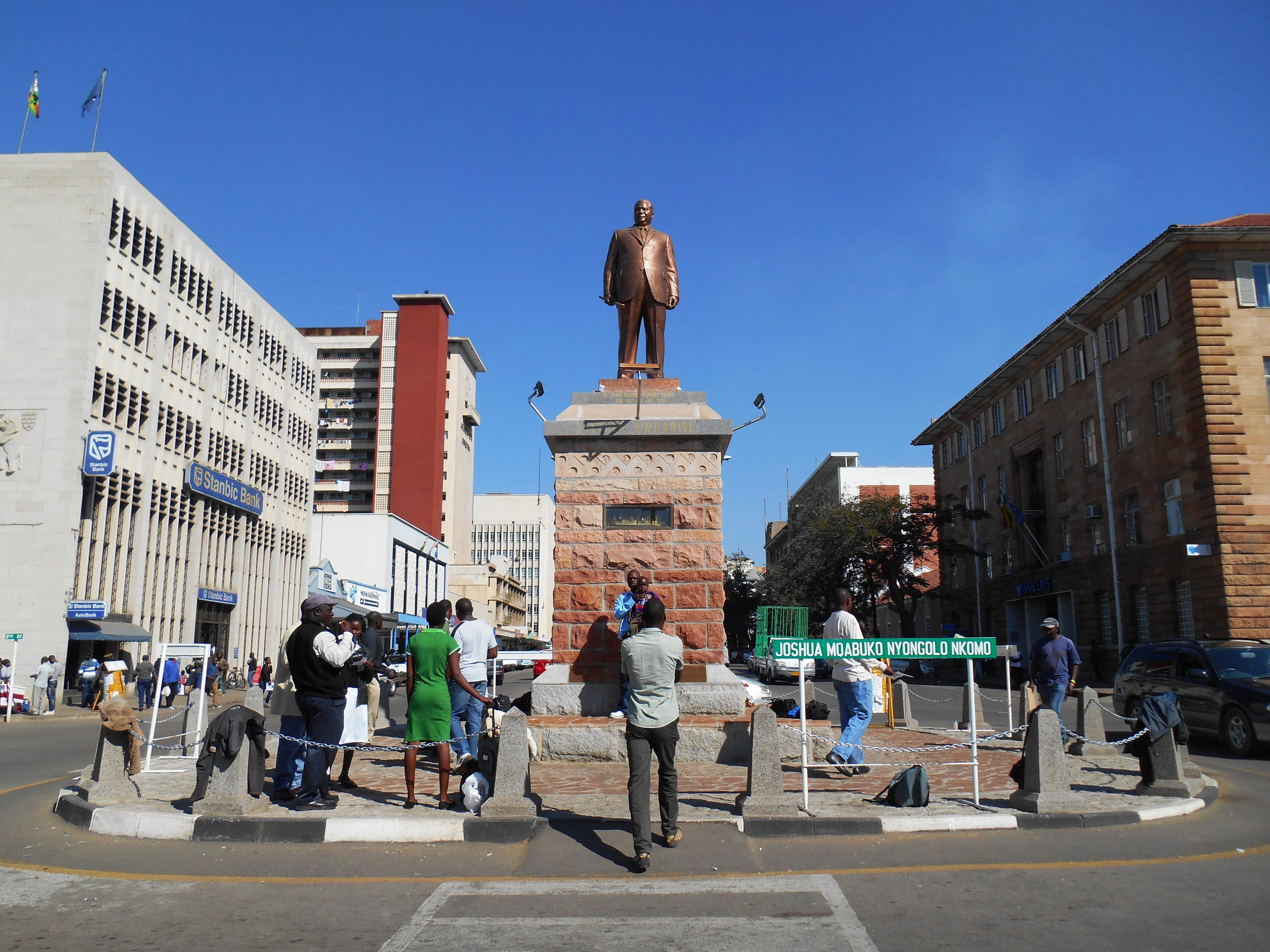
Full view of the monument

== Controversy ==
Nkomo's statue was first erected in 2010 but was pulled down before its official unveiling after the Nkomo family expressed unhappiness with the dimensions of the initial pedestal. Several Zimbabweans and Nkomo's supporters were not happy with the fact that a North Korean company was contracted to create the monument, yet the same country is said to be responsible for training a 5th Brigade which terrorised people in Matabeleland and Midlands regions from 1982 to 1987, killing more than 20,000 people during that era, including Joshua Nkomo's rebel group. Zimbabwean parliamentarians questioned the decision to overlook a Zimbabwean artist, David Mutasa, for the contract, and there was a debate about the issue in parliament.
