= Federigo Argentieri =

Italian scholar and academic

Federigo Argentieri is an Italian scholar and academic who teaches politics at John Cabot University. He specializes in European affairs, East and West, and Transatlantic relations. He has widely published on Eastern Europe under communism, particularly on the 1956 Hungarian Revolution, and on security issues after the Cold War. He serves as director of the Guarini Institute at the John Cabot University in Rome and is a member of the Association for Slavic, East European and Eurasian Studies.

== Selected publications ==
- Budapest 1956 - la rivoluzione calunniata, distributed with the daily newspaper “L'Unità”, 11 November 1996 [author]; 2nd revised edition published in 1998 by "I Libri di Reset", Rome; 3rd expanded and updated edition published in 2006 by Marsilio editori, Venice
- L’Europa centro-orientale e la NATO dopo il 1999- Il futuro politico-strategico dell’Europa, Milano, Angeli 2001 (author)
- Il ritorno degli ex, Rome, Editori Riuniti, 1996 [editor, co-author]
- Post comunismo terra incognita, Roma, Edizioni Associate 1994 [editor, co-author]
- La fine del blocco sovietico, Firenze, Ponte alle Grazie 1991 [editor and co-author]
- Federigo Argentieri intervista Miklós Vásárhelyi - La rivoluzione ungherese, Imre Nagy, la sinistra, foreword by François Fejtô, Roma, Levi 1988; Hungarian translation published by Szabad Tér, Debrecen, 1989 [author]
- L'Ottobre ungheres, Roma, Levi 1986 [co-author]
- Studi di storia dell'URSS e dell'Europa orientale, Quaderni Fondazione Feltrinelli n.31, Milano, Angeli 1986 [co-author]
