= Pioneers Park =

Suburb of Windhoek, Namibia

Coordinates: 22.5911°S 17.0678°E

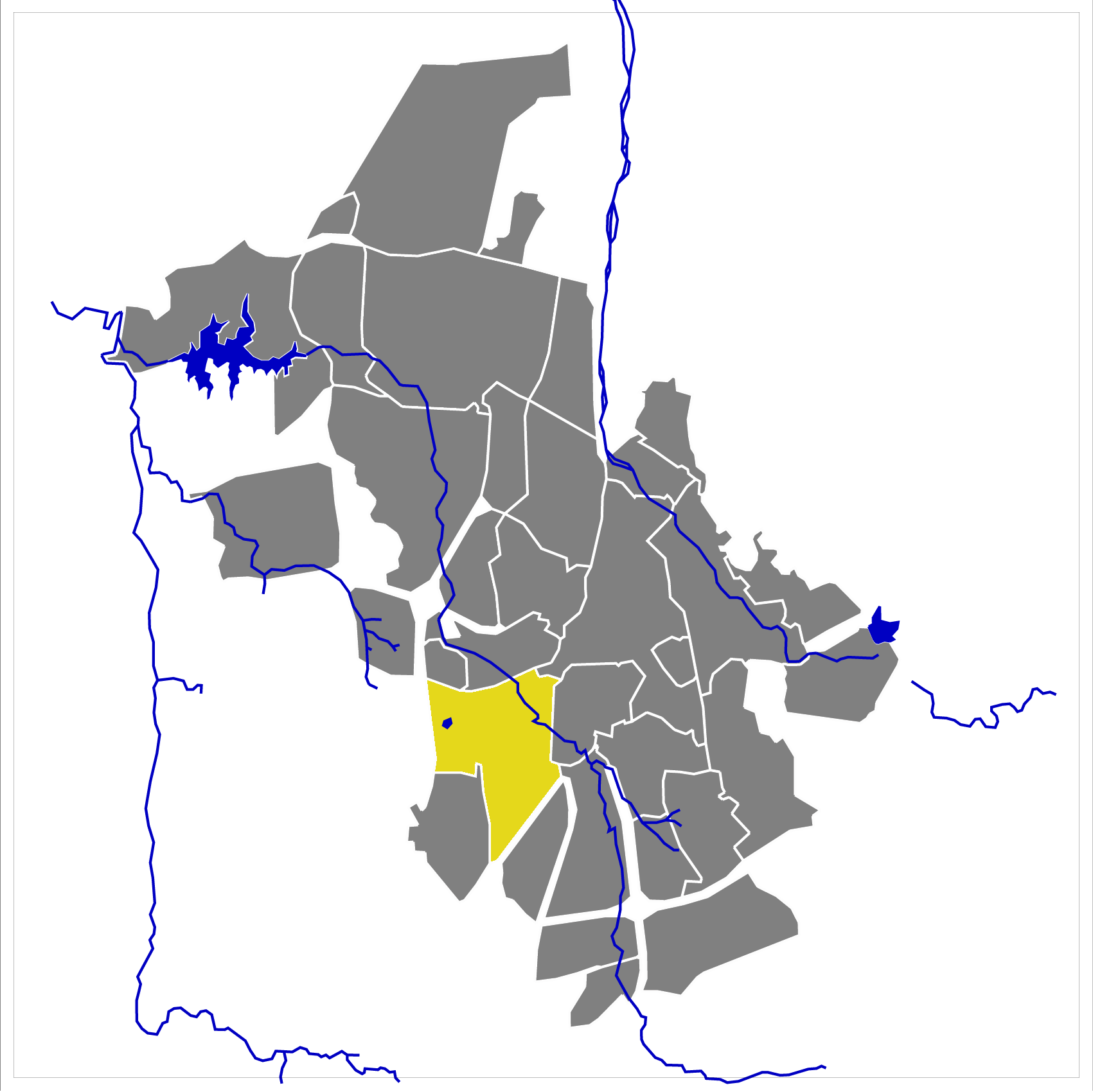
Pioneers Park (shown in yellow) within the city of Windhoek

Pioneers Park (Afrikaans: Pionierspark) is a suburb in the south of Windhoek, Namibia, in the Windhoek West parliamentary constituency. It was developed in the second half of the 20th century as a white community, with the previous black residents being expelled to Katutura. The suburb is mainly residential, but also contains the main campus of the University of Namibia. Other local facilities include a cemetery and the Catholic Church of St. Boniface, built in 1928, which is now a national monument.

Pioneers Park also has an important connection to the history of racial segregation and urban development in Windhoek. During the apartheid period, the area developed as a predominantly white, middle-class residential suburb, particularly during the 1970s. Its location is significant because it lies close to the former Old Location, a residential area where Black residents of Windhoek were forcibly concentrated before many were removed to Katutura. The history of Pioneers Park therefore reflects the wider pattern of racial separation that shaped Windhoek's development during the colonial and apartheid eras. Today, however, the suburb has a more diverse character and is an important educational area because it contains the main campus of the University of Namibia (UNAM). UNAM was established as an independent public university in 1992, following Namibia's independence, and its main campus occupies the former Windhoek College of Education site in Pioneers Park. The university has consequently become an important institution in the suburb and in Namibia's wider educational landscape.
