= Windhoek West =

Suburb of Windhoek, Namibia

Coordinates: 22°33′35″S 17°04′40″E

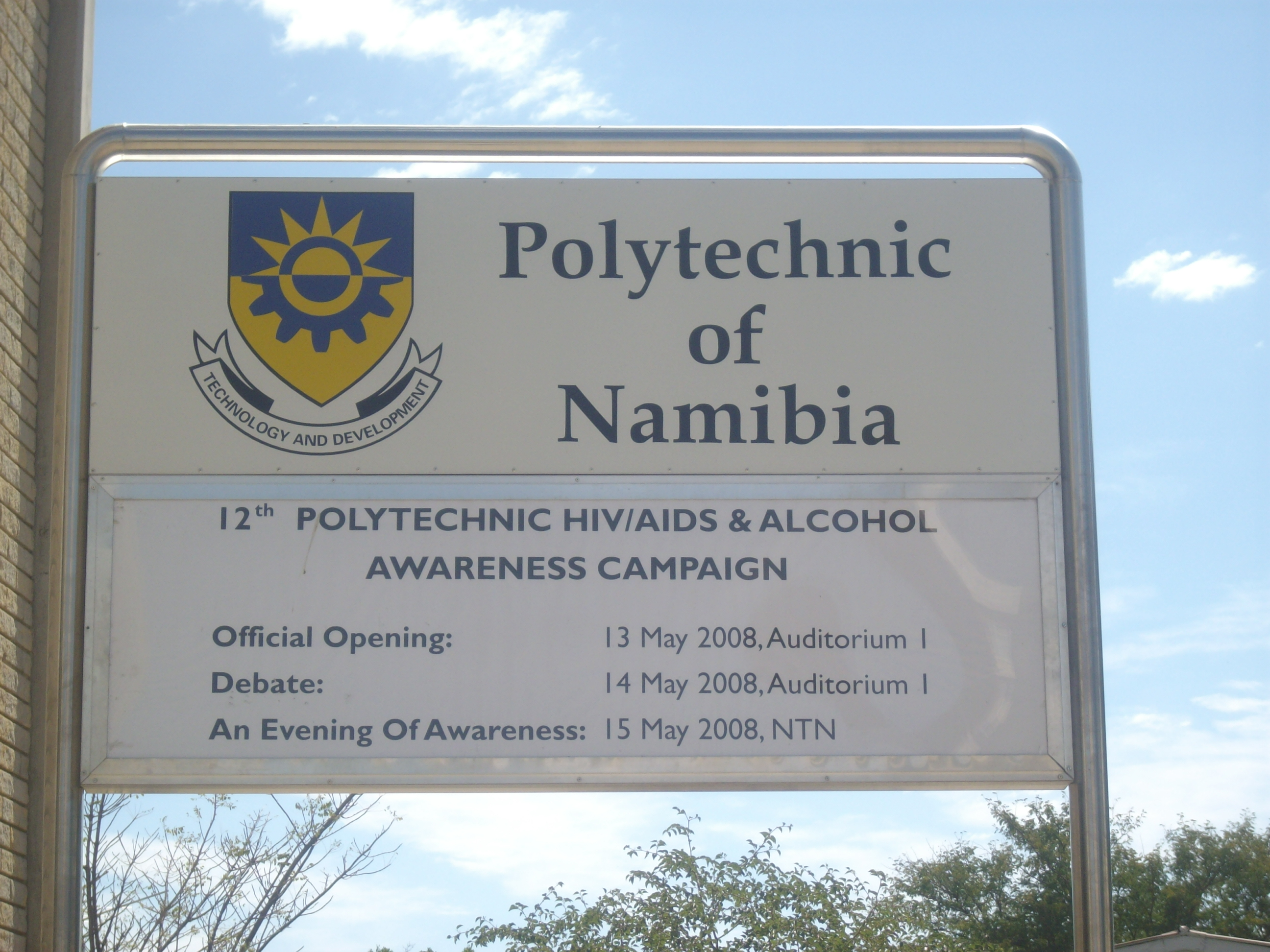
The Namibia University of Science and Technology (formerly the Polytechnic of Namibia) is based in Windhoek West

Windhoek West is a suburb of Windhoek, the capital of Namibia. The Namibia University of Science and Technology (formerly the Polytechnic of Namibia) is located in Windhoek West.

Electorally, Windhoek West is located in the Windhoek West Constituency.
