= Windhoek Central Business District =

Area of Windhoek, Namibia

Coordinates: 22°33′32″S 17°04′57″E

Windhoek central
- Central business district
- Windhoek Central Business District
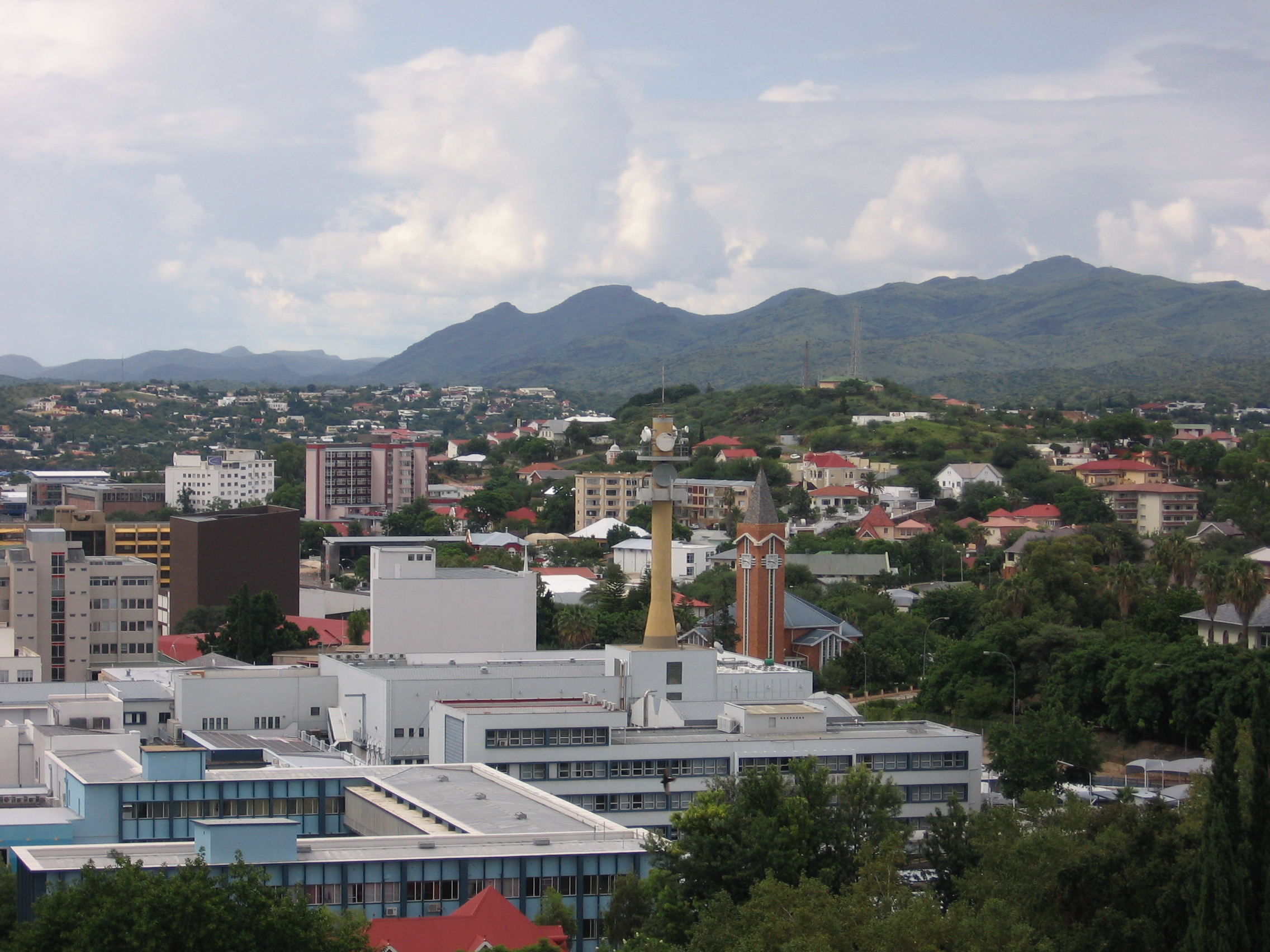
- Interactive map of Windhoek central

Area
  - Urban: 645 km^{2} (249 sq mi)

Windhoek Central Business District (short: Windhoek Central) is the inner city area of Windhoek, capital of Namibia. It is surrounded by the suburbs of Windhoek West and Hochland Park in the west, Windhoek-North in the north, Eros, Klein-Windhoek, Luxushügel and Auasblick in the east, and Suiderhof and Southern Industrial in the south.

Windhoek Central consists of residential and business properties as well as public spaces. Most of Windhoek's governmental and administrative buildings are situated here. The name addition Business District refers to the possibility to apply for business rights which is generally granted for erven in Windhoek that are situated in any proclaimed business district.

== Important buildings, roads and places ==
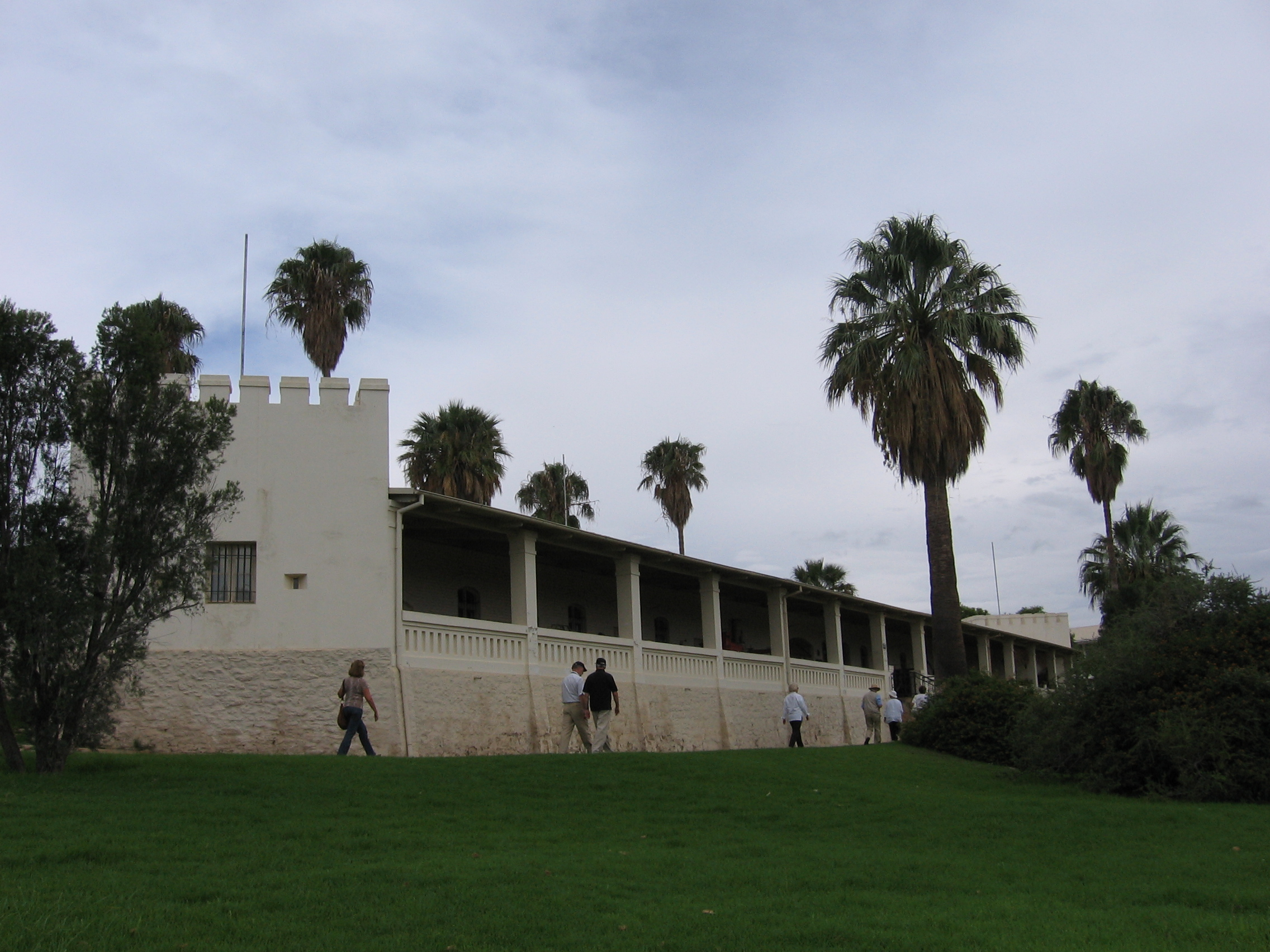
Alte Feste Windhoek

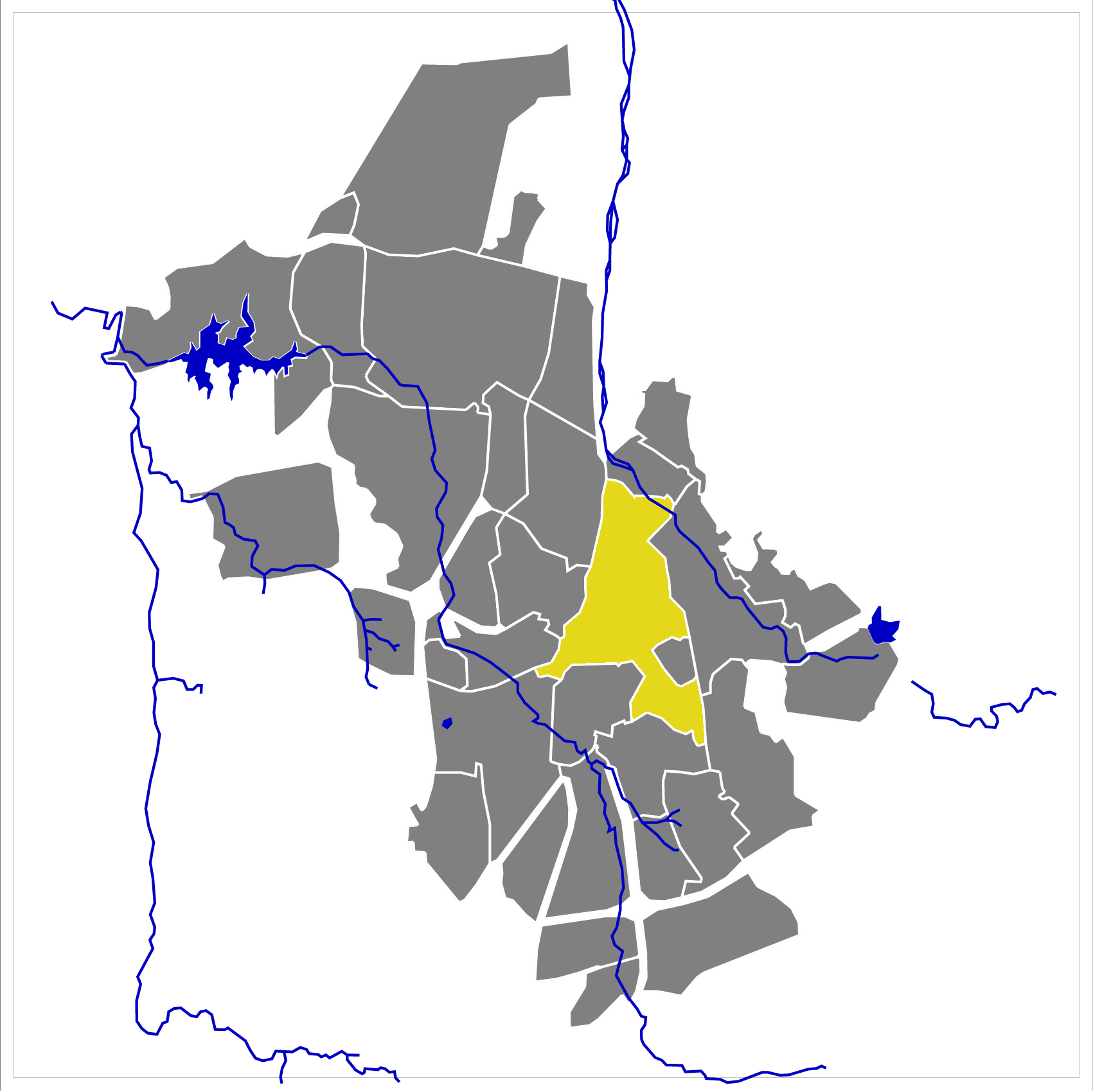
- Windhoek inner city area
  Independence Avenue
- Alte Feste
- Christ Church
- St. Mary's Cathedral
- Zoo Park
- Tintenpalast
- Supreme Court of Namibia
- Wernhil Shopping Centre
- Windhoek Railway Station
