= List of members of the 8th National Assembly of Namibia =

8th National Assembly of Namibia

Type
- Type: Bicameral

History
- Founded: 2025

Structure
- Seats: 104
- Political groups: SWAPO (51) IPC (20) AR (6) PDM (5) LPM (5) UDF (2) NEFF(1) SWANU (1) RP (1) NUDO (1) APP (1) NDP (1) BCP (1) Appointed (8)

Below is a list of members of the 8th National Assembly of Namibia. They were selected by their parties based on the results of the 2024 Namibian general election. This National Assembly will be inaugurated on 20 March 2025.

Like each of the previous National Assemblies, it is led by the South West Africa People's Organisation (SWAPO). The 8th National Assembly has 104 seats. 96 candidates were elected according to party lists and are assembled below in the order they appear on their party lists. The remaining 8 members will be appointed by the President of Namibia to serve as non-voting members.

== South West Africa People's Organisation (SWAPO) ==
- Sophia Shaningwa
- Uahekua Herunga
- Hilaria Mukapuli
- Modestus Amutse
- Lucia Iipumbu
- Iipumbu Shiimi
- Fenny Nanyeni
- Natangwe Ithete
- Emma Theofelus
- Phillipus Katamelo
- Gaudentia Krohne
- Charles Mubita
- Evelyn !Nawases-Taeyele
- Derek Klazen
- Marta Axser-Itope
- Royal /Ui/o/oo
- Alexia Manombe-Ncube
- Elder Filipe
- Nono Katjingisua
- Pohamba Shifeta
- Saara Kuugongelwa-Amadhila
- Ephraim Nekongo
- Indileni Daniel
- Alpheus !Naruseb
- Ruth Masake
- Elijah Ngurare
- Linda Mbwale
- Dino Ballotti
- Fenny Tutjavi
- Erastus Mbumba Haitengela
- Emma Kantema-Gaomas
- Tobie Aupindi
- Jennely Matundu
- Werner Iita
- Tuulikki Abraham
- Sebastian Karupu
- Hilma Iita
- Salomon April
- Clemencia Coetzee
- Modestus Atshipara
- Justina Jonas
- Marius Sheya
- Lucia Witbooi
- Willem Amutenya
- Sirkka Ausiku
- Elifas Dingara
- Marlyn Mbakera
- Austin Samupwa
- Sharonice Busch
- Paula Kooper
- John Likando

== Independent Patriots for Change (IPC) ==
- Michael Mwashindange
- Lilani Brinkman
- Michael Mulunga
- Rodney Cloete
- Aloisius Kangulu
- John Louw Mouton
- Elvis Lizazi
- Otillie Haitota
- Vilho Ihemba
- Lucia Mbuti
- Abed Hishoono
- Immanuel Nashinge
- Lillian Lutuhezi
- Ferdinand Hengombe
- Armas Amukoto
- Rodrick Likando
- Tuhafeni Kalangula
- Tapalo Markus
- Bertha Nghifikwa
- Isra Kanyemba

== Affirmative Repositioning (AR) ==
- Job Amupanda
- Fredrick Twiindileni Shitana
- Tuhafeni Kalola
- Ester Haikola-Sakaria
- George Kambala
- Vaino Tuhafeni Hangula

== Popular Democratic Movement (PDM) ==
- McHenry Venaani
- Winnie Moongo
- Ricky Vries
- Rosa Mbinge-Tjeundo
- Inna Hengari

== Landless People’s Movement (LPM) ==
- Bernadus Swartbooi
- Aina Hanganeni Kodi
- Dawid Eigub
- Utaara Mootu
- Eneas Emvula

== United Democratic Front (UDF) ==
- Nico Somaeb
- Hendrik Gaobaeb

== Namibian Economic Freedom Fighters (NEFF) ==
- Longinus Iipumbu

== South West African National Union (SWANU) ==
- Evilastus Kaaronda

== Republican Party (RP) ==
- Mathias Sipipa Mbundu

== National Unity Democratic Organisation (NUDO) ==
- Vetaruhe Kandorozu

== All People‘s Party (APP) ==
- Ambrosius Kumbwa

== National Democratic Party (NDP) ==
- Martin Lukato

== Body of Christ Party (BCP) ==
- Festus Thomas

== Members appointed by the President ==
President Netumbo Nandi-Ndaitwah appointed eight additional members to the assembly. They won‘t possess any voting rights and are mostly appointed to serve as ministers or deputies in Cabinet of Namibia:

1. Frans Kapofi
2. Selma Ashipala-Musavyi
3. Mac-Albert Hengari (until 23 April 2025)
  - Inge Zaamwani-Kamwi (since 7 May 2025)
4. Erica Shafudah
5. Sankwasa James Sankwasa
6. Sanet Steenkamp
7. Fillemon Wise Immanuel
8. Esperance Luvindao

National Assembly of Namibia
Preceded by 7th National Assembly	8th National Assembly; 21 March 2025 – 21 March 2030	Succeeded by 9th National Assembly
