= Aminuis Constituency =

Electoral constituency in the Omaheke region of eastern Namibia

Coordinates: 23°43′S 19°21′E

Aminuis constituency (red) in the Omaheke Region of Namibia

Aminuis Constituency is an electoral constituency in the Omaheke Region of Namibia. It had 7,847 registered voters in 2020. The district capital is the settlement of Aminuis. The constituency forms part of the border between Namibia and Botswana.

Aminuis Constituency covers an area of 12,994 km^{2} (5,017 sq mi). It had a population of 12,306 in 2011, down from 12,392 in 2001. Villages and settlements in the Aminuis constituency include:

- Leonardville
- Okombepera
- Onderombapa
- Ondjiripumua
- Okamuina
- Otjijere
- Okumu
- Ondjirimua
- Omitiomire
- Ozondjiva

The constituency also is the home of the traditional seat of the Ovaherero Paramount Chief, at the village of Toasis, situated south of Aminuis. In the Herero and Nama War of 1904–1908 the village was the location of the Battle of Toasis on 17 December 1905. Later Chief Hosea Kutako had his homestead there, in December 2024 a community heroes' acre for Ovaherero and Ovambanderu was inaugurated.

== Politics ==
Aminuis is traditionally a stronghold of National Unity Democratic Organisation (NUDO). In the 2004 regional elections, its candidate Erwin Gebhard Uanguta with 2,480 of the 3,944 votes cast.

The 2015 regional election was won by its candidate Peter Kazongominja with 2,413 votes, followed by Utiriua Kavari of the SWAPO Party with 1,785 votes. Councillor Kazongominja (NUDO) was reelected in the 2020 regional election with 1,921 votes, followed by Ishmael Mungunda (SWAPO) with 1,482 votes and independent candidate Isando Kavari with 600 votes.

=== 1998 regional election ===
Candidate	Party	Votes	%
Mburuma Kerina	DTA	1,708	76.49
Borry Katjiuanjo	SWAPO	525	23.51
Total		2,233	100.00
Valid votes		2,233	98.15
Invalid/blank votes		42	1.85
Total votes		2,275	100.00
Registered voters/turnout		5,355	42.48

=== 1999 general election ===
==== National Assembly ====
Party	Votes	%
DTA	1,920	66.57
SWAPO	555	19.24
CoD	234	8.11
MAG	59	2.05
UDF	36	1.25
SWANU	34	1.18
DPN	28	0.97
FCN	18	0.62
Total	2,884	100.00
Valid votes	2,884	98.83
Invalid/blank votes	34	1.17
Total votes	2,918	100.00

=== 2004 general election ===
==== National Assembly ====
Party	Votes	%
NUDO	2,734	54.46
SWAPO	1,246	24.82
NDMC	289	5.76
DTA	272	5.42
SWANU	122	2.43
RP	119	2.37
CoD	101	2.01
MAG	85	1.69
UNF	52	1.04
Total	5,020	100.00
Valid votes	5,020	99.15
Invalid/blank votes	43	0.85
Total votes	5,063	100.00

=== 2004 regional election ===
Party	Votes	%
NUDO	2,480	62.88
SWAPO	927	23.50
DPN	361	9.15
DTA	176	4.46
Total	3,944	100.00

=== 2009 general election ===
==== National Assembly ====
Party	Votes	%
NUDO	2,234	47.91
SWAPO	1,163	24.94
RDP	393	8.43
SWANU	189	4.05
UDF	158	3.39
DTA	145	3.11
NDMC	118	2.53
RP	112	2.40
MAG	80	1.72
CoD	29	0.62
NDP	16	0.34
DPN	10	0.21
APP	9	0.19
WRP	7	0.15
Total	4,663	100.00
Valid votes	4,663	98.98
Invalid/blank votes	48	1.02
Total votes	4,711	100.00

=== 2010 regional election ===
Candidate	Party	Votes	%
Erwin Uanguta	NUDO	1,796	47.70
Manasse N. Mbingeneeko	SWAPO	1,135	30.15
Theo Ngaujake	Independent	659	17.50
Kuzeeko A. Kangueehi	SWANU	107	2.84
Gerson Mbatemua	DTA	68	1.81
Total		3,765	100.00

=== 2014 general election ===
==== Presidential ====
2014 Presidential election
Candidate	Party	Votes	%
Asser Mbai	NUDO	2,215	43.10
Hage Geingob	SWAPO	2,192	42.65
McHenry Venaani	DTA	264	5.14
Usutuaije Maamberua	SWANU	177	3.44
Ignatius Shixwameni	RDP	167	3.25
Hidipo Hamutenya	RP	91	1.77
Henk Mudge	APP	15	0.29
Ben Ulenga	CoD	12	0.23
Jan Mukwilongo	NEFF	6	0.12
Total		5,139	100.00
Registered voters/turnout		6,669	77.06

==== National Assembly ====
Party	Votes	%
NUDO	2,276	44.26
SWAPO	1,930	37.53
DTA	238	4.63
SWANU	166	3.23
RDP	139	2.70
APP	72	1.40
UDF	61	1.19
RP	60	1.17
WRP	45	0.88
MAG	43	0.84
CDV	27	0.53
CoD	27	0.53
NDP	23	0.45
UPM	20	0.39
DPN	9	0.18
NEFF	6	0.12
Total	5,142	100.00
Registered voters/turnout	6,669	77.10

=== 2015 regional election ===
Candidate	Party	Votes	%
Peter Kazongominja	NUDO	2,413	57.48
Raphael K. Utiriua	SWAPO	1,785	42.52
Total		4,198	100.00

=== 2019 general election ===
==== Presidential ====
2019 Presidential election
Candidate	Party	Votes	%	+/–
Esther Muinjangue	NUDO	1,705	43.23	▲0.13
Hage Geingob	SWAPO	1,556	39.45	▼3.20
McHenry Venaani	PDM	198	5.02	▼0.12
Panduleni Itula	Independent	146	3.70	New
Bernadus Swartbooi	LPM	121	3.07	New
Tangeni Iijambo	SWANU	90	2.28	▼1.16
Apius Auchab	UDF	48	1.22	New
Henk Mudge	RP	27	0.68	▼1.09
Mike Kavekotora	RDP	20	0.51	▼2.74
Ignatius Shixwameni	APP	18	0.46	▲0.17
Epafras Mukwiilongo	NEFF	15	0.38	▲0.26
Total		3,944	100.00	–
Registered voters/turnout		7,200	54.78	▼22.28

==== National Assembly ====
2019 National Assembly election
Party	Votes	%	+/–
NUDO	1,768	44.94	▲0.68
SWAPO	1,490	37.87	▲0.34
PDM	235	5.97	New
LPM	160	4.07	New
SWANU	93	2.36	▼0.86
APP	47	1.19	▼0.21
RP	40	1.02	▼0.15
CDV	23	0.58	▲0.05
UDF	18	0.46	▼0.73
CoD	16	0.41	▼0.12
RDP	14	0.36	▼2.34
WRP	12	0.31	▼0.57
NDP	7	0.18	▼0.27
NPF	6	0.15	New
NEFF	5	0.13	▲0.01
Total	3,934	100.00	–
Registered voters/turnout	7,200	54.64	▼17.81

=== 2020 regional election ===
Candidate	Party	Votes	%
Peter Kazongominja	NUDO	1,921	45.85
Ishmael Mungunda	SWAPO	1,482	35.37
Isando Kavari	Independent	600	14.32
Jacob Mahingo	PDM	102	2.43
Siegfried Hengari	Independent	85	2.03
Total		4,190	100.00

=== 2024 general election ===
==== Presidential ====
2024 Presidential election
Candidate	Party	Votes	%	+/–
Netumbo Nandi-Ndaitwah	SWAPO	2,165	38.41	▼1.04
Evilastus Kaaronda	SWANU	1,875	33.27	▲30.99
Panduleni Itula	IPC	647	11.48	▲7.78
McHenry Venaani	PDM	438	7.77	▲2.75
Bernadus Swartbooi	LPM	303	5.38	▲2.31
Henk Mudge	RP	102	1.81	▲1.13
Mike Kavekotora	RDP	21	0.37	▼0.14
Job Amupanda	AR	16	0.28	New
Ambrosius Kumbwa	APP	16	0.28	▼0.18
Hendrik Gaobaeb	UDF	13	0.23	▼0.99
Erastus Shuumbwa	ADM	11	0.20	New
Sakaria Likuwa	UNP	9	0.16	New
Vaino Amuthenu	CoD	7	0.12	New
Epafras Mukwiilongo	NEFF	7	0.12	▼0.26
Festus Thomas	BCP	6	0.11	New
Total		5,636	100.00	–
Valid votes		5,636	98.81	
Invalid/blank votes		68	1.19	
Total votes		5,704	100.00	
Registered voters/turnout		7,162	79.64	▲24.86

==== National Assembly ====
2024 National Assembly election
Party	Votes	%	+/–
SWANU	2,048	36.37	▲34.01
SWAPO	1,892	33.60	▼4.27
NUDO	584	10.37	▼34.57
PDM	325	5.77	▼0.20
LPM	270	4.79	▼0.72
IPC	255	4.53	New
RP	93	1.65	▲0.63
AR	38	0.67	New
NDP	16	0.28	▲0.10
NEFF	15	0.27	▲0.14
NPF	15	0.27	▲0.12
RDP	12	0.21	▼0.15
UDF	12	0.21	▼0.25
ADM	10	0.18	New
APP	9	0.16	▼1.03
BCP	8	0.14	New
CDV	8	0.14	▼0.44
CoD	8	0.14	▼0.27
UPM	6	0.11	New
NEFC	5	0.09	New
UNP	2	0.04	New
Total	5,631	100.00	–
Valid votes	5,631	98.86	
Invalid/blank votes	65	1.14	
Total votes	5,696	100.00	
Registered voters/turnout	7,162	79.53	▲24.89

== See also ==
- Administrative divisions of Namibia
