= Anamulenge Constituency =

Electoral constituency in the Omusati region of northern Namibia

Coordinates: 17°29′S 15°1′E

Anamulenge Constituency (red) in the Omusati Region

Anamulenge Constituency is an electoral constituency in the Omusati Region of northern Namibia. It had 11,186 registered voters in 2020. Its district capital is the settlement of Anamulenge.

Anamulenge Constituency covers an area of 354 km^{2} (137 sq mi). It had a population of 13,410 in 2011, up from 12,617 in 2001. The Onhokolo settlement belongs to the constituency.

== Politics ==
Anamulenge is traditionally a stronghold of the South West Africa People's Organization (SWAPO) party. In the 2004 regional election SWAPO candidate Aipinge Joseph Kanyenye Aluvilu won uncontested and became councillor after no opposition party nominated a candidate.

In the 2015 local and regional elections SWAPO candidate Werner Kalipi won uncontested and became councillor after no opposition party nominated a candidate. The SWAPO candidate won the 2020 regional election by a landslide. Tylves Angala obtained 3,664 votes, followed by independent candidate Erphas Heita with 361 votes and Joseph Shiningayamwe of the Independent Patriots for Change (IPC), an opposition party formed in August 2020, with 241 votes.

=== 2024 general election ===
==== Presidential ====
2024 presidential election
Candidate	Party	Votes	%
Netumbo Nandi-Ndaitwah	SWAPO	7,127	86.01
Panduleni Itula	IPC	995	12.01
Job Amupanda	AR	80	0.97
McHenry Venaani	PDM	26	0.31
Jan Mukwiilongo	NEFF	18	0.22
Thomas Festus	BCP	13	0.16
Bernadus Swartbooi	LPM	7	0.08
Erastus Shuumbwa	ADM	4	0.05
Vaino Amuthenu	CoD	3	0.04
Evilastus Kaaronda	SWANU	3	0.04
Ambrosius Kumbwa	APP	3	0.04
Henk Mudge	RP	3	0.04
Hendrik Gaobaeb	UDF	2	0.02
Mike Kavekotora	RDP	2	0.02
Total		8,286	100.00
Valid votes		8,286	98.28
Invalid/blank votes		145	1.72
Total votes		8,431	100.00
Registered voters/turnout		9,514	88.62
Source: Electoral Commission of Namibia

==== National Assembly ====
2024 National Assembly election
Party	Votes	%
SWAPO	6,909	84.23
IPC	855	10.42
AR	277	3.38
PDM	38	0.46
NEFF	34	0.41
BCP	27	0.33
SWANU	14	0.17
NEFC	11	0.13
LPM	8	0.10
UDF	7	0.09
UPM	6	0.07
CoD	5	0.06
NPF	4	0.05
RDP	3	0.04
RP	2	0.02
APP	1	0.01
NDP	1	0.01
NUDO	1	0.01
Total	8,203	100.00
Valid votes	8,203	97.90
Invalid/blank votes	176	2.10
Total votes	8,379	100.00
Registered voters/turnout	9,514	88.07
Source: Electoral Commission of Namibia
