= Elim Constituency =

Electoral constituency in the Omusati region of northern Namibia

Elim Constituency (red) in the Omusati Region

Elim Constituency is an electoral constituency in the Omusati Region of Namibia. It had 7,883 registered voters in 2020. Its district capital is the settlement of Elim.

Elim Constituency covers an area of 444 km^{2} (171 sq mi). It had a population of 11,406 in 2011, up from 10,850 in 2001. It borders to the north and west to the constituencies Okalongo and Oshikuku and in the east to the Oshana Region. There are a number of villages in the constituency, some being: Onashiku, Iiyale, Iino, Olupumbu, Iiyanguti, Olupembana, Ondangwa, Onegali, Onamega.

The constituency contains the homestead of Iipumpu Ya Tshilongo, king of the Uukwambi from 1907 to 1932. The homestead in Onashiku was proclaimed a national monument in 2014, and de-proclaimed a few months later.

== Politics ==
Elim constituency is traditionally a stronghold of the South West Africa People's Organization (SWAPO) party. The 2004 regional election was won by SWAPO politician Gerhard Shiimi. He received 4,124 of the 4,266 votes cast.

In the 2015 local and regional elections SWAPO candidate Shiimi won uncontested and remained councillor after no opposition party nominated a candidate. Councillor Shiimi (SWAPO) was reelected in the 2020 regional election. He obtained 2,775 votes, far ahead of Kilian Amupolo, an independent candidate with 511 votes.

=== 2024 general election ===
==== Presidential ====
Candidate	Party	Votes	%
Netumbo Nandi-Ndaitwah	SWAPO	5,000	77.29
Panduleni Itula	IPC	1,162	17.96
Jan Mukwiilongo	NEFF	140	2.16
Job Amupanda	AR	104	1.61
McHenry Venaani	PDM	25	0.39
Erastus Shuumbwa	ADM	13	0.20
Festus Thomas	BCP	12	0.19
Mike Kavekotora	RDP	4	0.06
Vaino Amuthenu	CoD	3	0.05
Hendrik Gaobaeb	UDF	2	0.03
Evilastus Kaaronda	SWANU	2	0.03
Bernadus Swartbooi	LPM	2	0.03
Total		6,469	100.00
Valid votes		6,469	98.90
Invalid/blank votes		72	1.10
Total votes		6,541	100.00
Registered voters/turnout		6,450	101.41
Source: ECN

==== National Assembly ====
Party	Votes	%
SWAPO	4,796	73.42
IPC	888	13.59
NEFF	365	5.59
AR	354	5.42
PDM	43	0.66
NEFC	28	0.43
BCP	18	0.28
SWANU	11	0.17
UDF	9	0.14
NPF	5	0.08
UNP	4	0.06
LPM	3	0.05
NUDO	2	0.03
RDP	2	0.03
APP	1	0.02
CDV	1	0.02
CoD	1	0.02
NDP	1	0.02
Total	6,532	100.00
Valid votes	6,532	98.78
Invalid/blank votes	81	1.22
Total votes	6,613	100.00
Registered voters/turnout	6,450	102.53
Source: ECN
