= Politics of Namibia =

Politics of Namibia takes place in a framework of a semi-presidential representative democratic republic, whereby the President of Namibia is both head of state and head of government, and of a pluriform multi-party system. Executive power is exercised by both the president and the government. Legislative power is vested in the two chambers of Parliament. The judiciary is independent of the executive and the legislature.

Additional to the government political structure Namibia has a network of traditional leadership with currently 51 recognised traditional authorities and their leaders. These authorities cover the entire Namibian territory. Traditional leaders are entrusted with the allocation of communal land and the formulation of the traditional group's customary laws. They also take over minor judicial work.

The Economist Intelligence Unit rated Namibia a "flawed democracy" in 2023.

== Constitution ==
The Constituent Assembly of Namibia produced a constitution which established a multi-party system and a bill of rights. It also limited the executive president to two five-year terms and provided for the private ownership of property. The three branches of government are subject to checks and balances, and a provision is made for judicial review. The constitution also states that Namibia should have a mixed economy, and foreign investment should be encouraged.

The constitution is noted for being one of the first to incorporate protection of the environment into its text. Namibia is a democratic but one party dominant state with the South-West Africa People's Organisation in power. Opposition parties are allowed, but are widely considered to have no real chance of gaining power.

While the ethnic-based, three-tier, South African-imposed governing authorities have been dissolved, the current government pledged for the sake of national reconciliation to retain civil servants employed during the colonial period. The government is still organising itself on both national and regional levels.

The Constituent Assembly converted itself into the National Assembly on 16 February 1990, retaining all the members elected on a straight party ticket.

== President ==
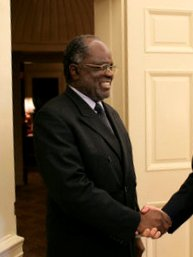
Hifikepunye Pohamba, 2nd President of Namibia

The Namibian head of state is the president, elected by popular vote every five years. Namibia's founding president is Sam Nujoma, who was in office for three terms from 21 March 1990 (Namibia's Independence Day) until 21 March 2005. Hifikepunye Pohamba was Namibia's second president, serving from 2005 to 2015. Hage Geingob was president of Namibia from 2015 to 2024. Nangolo Mbumba was president of Namibia until 21 March 2025, when he was succeeded by Netumbo Nandi-Ndaitwah.

== Separation of powers ==
While the separation of powers principle is enshrined in the country's constitution, Namibia's civil society and the opposition repeatedly have criticised the overlap between executive and legislature. All cabinet members also sit in the National Assembly and dominate that body—not numerically but by being the superiors to ordinary members.

=== Executive branch ===
The government is headed by the prime minister, who, together with his or her cabinet, is appointed by the president. SWAPO, the primary force behind independence, is still the country's largest party. Hage Geingob was Namibia's first prime minister. He was appointed on 21 March 1990 and served until 28 August 2002. Theo-Ben Gurirab was prime minister from 28 August 2002 to 21 March 2005, and Nahas Angula from 21 March 2005 to 4 December 2012. He was succeeded by Hage Geingob (in office from 4 December 2012 to 21 March 2015), who in turn was succeeded as prime minister by Saara Kuugongelwa when he became president of Namibia on 21 March 2015 and served until 21 March 2025.

=== Legislative branch ===
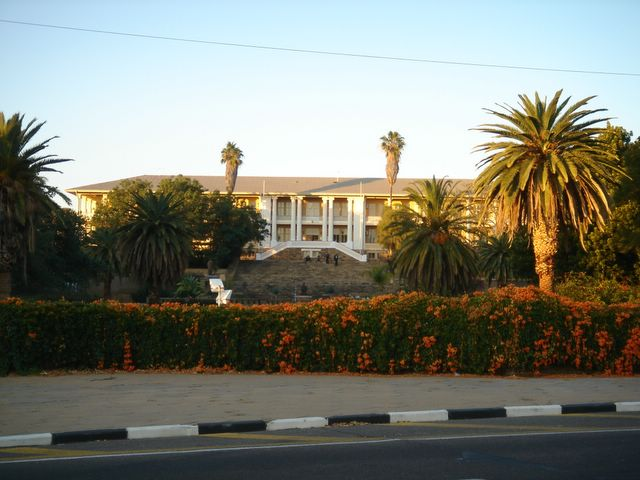
The Tintenpalast in Windhoek, housing the Parliament of Namibia

Parliament has two chambers, consisting of a National Assembly (lower house), elected for a five-year term, and a National Council (upper house), elected for a six-year term. The Assembly is the primary legislative body, with the Council playing more of an advisory role.

From Namibian independence until 2014 the National Assembly consisted of 78 members, 72 members elected by proportional representation and 6 members appointed by the president. The National Council had 26 representatives of the Regional Councils. Every Regional Council in the 13 regions of Namibia elected two representatives to serve on this body. Prior to the 2014 general elections the constitution was amended. Since then there are 104 seats in the National Assembly (96 elected, 8 appointed), and 42 seats in the National Council (3 from each region, with the number of regions increased to 14).

=== Judicial branch ===
The highest judicial body is the Supreme Court, whose judges are appointed by the president on the recommendation of the Judicial Service Commission. The Supreme Court of Namibia is led by the Chief Justice of Namibia the highest judicial officer in Namibia.

The second highest court is the High Court whose judges are also appointed by the president on recommendation of the Judicial service commission. The High court is led by the Judge-President of Namibia who also acts as the Deputy Chief Justice of Namibia. The High court has original jurisdiction over all matters within Namibia.

The Lower Courts of Namibia are the lowest courts in Namibia and serve as courts of record. They serve as trial courts.

The judicial structure in Namibia parallels that of South Africa. In 1919, Roman-Dutch law was declared the common law of the territory and remains so to the present.

== Political parties and elections ==
Elections were held in 1992, to elect members of 13 newly established Regional Councils, as well as new municipal officials. Two members from each Regional Council serve simultaneously as members of the National Council, the country's second house of Parliament. Nineteen of its members are from the ruling SWAPO party, and seven are from the Democratic Turnhalle Alliance (DTA). In December 1994, elections were held for the President and the National Assembly.

Namibia has about 40 political groups, ranging from modern political parties to traditional groups based on tribal authority. Some represent single tribes or ethnic groups while others encompass several. Most participate in political alliances, some of which are multiracial, with frequently shifting membership.

SWAPO is the ruling party, and all but one of the new government's first cabinet posts went to SWAPO members. A Marxist-oriented movement, SWAPO has become less left-wing and now espouses the need for a mixed economy. SWAPO has been a legal political party since its formation and was cautiously active in Namibia, although before implementation of the UN Plan, it was forbidden to hold meetings of more than 20 people, and its leadership was subject to frequent detention. In December 1976, the UN General Assembly recognised SWAPO as "the sole and authentic representative of the Namibian people," a characterisation other internal parties did not accept.

In the 1999 presidential and parliamentary elections, SWAPO continued its history of political dominance, taking 55 of the 72 Assembly seats, and returning President Sam Nujoma to the office for his third term. The principal opposition parties are the Congress of Democrats (CoD) and the Democratic Turnhalle Alliance (DTA), with each possessing seven seats in the National Assembly.

In 2019 Hage Geingob won the presidential election and received a second term as president. His percentage of votes gained, however, dropped significantly from 87% in 2014 to 56% in 2019. While rural areas predominantly supported Geingob, many urban centres voted for the independent candidate, Panduleni Itula, who received 29% of the overall votes. No other candidate achieved a two-digit result. SWAPO, yet again, won a majority of seats in the National Assembly, but closely missed the threshold for a two-thirds majority, which it held since 1994. Consequently, opposition parties also gained seats, most prominently the Popular Democratic Movement (PDM), formerly the Democratic Turnhalle Alliance (DTA), which obtained 16 seats in the National Assembly. The PDM's 16.60% vote share is its best electoral performance since the 1994 election. On 4 February 2024, President Hage Geingob died and he was immediately succeeded by vice-president Nangolo Mbumba as new President of Namibia.

On 21 March 2025, Netumbo Nandi-Ndaitwah was sworn in as Namibia's first female president. She had won November's election with a 58% share of the vote as the candidate of the ruling South West Africa People's Organisation (Swapo).

=== 2019 presidential election ===
Candidate	Party	Votes	%
Hage Geingob	SWAPO	464,703	56.3
Panduleni Itula	Independent	242,657	29.4
McHenry Venaani	Popular Democratic Movement	43,959	5.3
Bernadus Swartbooi	Landless People's Movement	22,542	2.7
Apius Auchab	United Democratic Front	22,115	2.7
Esther Muinjangue	National Unity Democratic Organisation	12,039	1.5
Tangeni Iiyambo	SWANU	5,959	0.7
Henk Mudge	Republican Party	4,379	0.5
Mike Kavekotora	Rally for Democracy and Progress	3,515	0.4
Ignatius Shixwameni	All People's Party	3,304	0.4
Jan Mukwilongo	Namibian Economic Freedom Fighters	1,026	0.1
Invalid/blank votes		0	–
Total		826,198	100
Registered voters/turnout		1,358,468	60.8
Source: ECN

=== 2019 parliamentary election ===
Party	Votes	%	Seats	+/–
SWAPO	536,861	65.45	63	–14
Popular Democratic Movement	136,576	16.65	16	+11
Landless People's Movement	38,956	4.75	4	New
National Unity Democratic Organisation	16,066	1.96	2	0
All People's Party	14,664	1.79	2	0
United Democratic Front	14,644	1.79	2	0
Republican Party	14,546	1.77	2	+1
Namibian Economic Freedom Fighters	13,580	1.66	2	+2
Rally for Democracy and Progress	8,953	1.09	1	–2
Christian Democratic Voice	5,841	0.71	1	+1
SWANU	5,330	0.65	1	0
Congress of Democrats	4,645	0.57	0	0
National Democratic Party	4,559	0.56	0	0
Workers Revolutionary Party	3,212	0.39	0	–2
National Patriotic Front	1,785	0.22	0	New
Invalid/blank votes	0	–	–	–
Total	820,227	100	96	–
Registered voters/turnout	1,358,468	60.4	–	–
Source: ECN

== Traditional leadership ==
Namibian government has so far recognised 51 traditional authorities, and a further 40 applications are pending. These institutions are based on ethnicity and headed by the traditional leader of that ethnic group or clan. These positions are not paid by the state. Instead the traditional group's members are expected to sustain their leadership. Government did, however, give one car each to the recognised authorities, and awards allowances for fuel and administrative work. The parallel existence of traditional authorities and the Namibian government in Namibia is controversial.

== Administrative divisions ==
Namibia is divided into 14 regions: Zambezi, Erongo, Hardap, ǁKaras, Kavango East, Kavango West, Khomas, Kunene, Ohangwena, Omaheke, Omusati, Oshana, Oshikoto, and Otjozondjupa.

== International organisation participation ==
Namibia is member of ACP, AfDB, C, ECA, FAO, G-77, IAEA, IBRD, ICAO, ICCt, ICFTU, ICRM, IFAD, IFC, IFRCS, ILO, IMF, IMO, Interpol, IOC, IOM (observer), ISO (correspondent), ITU, NAM, OAU, OPCW, SACU, SADC, UN, UNCTAD, UNESCO, UNHCR, UNIDO, UNMEE, UPU, WCL, WHO, WIPO, WMO, WToO, WTrO
