= Elections in Namibia =

Elections in Namibia determine who holds public political offices in the country. Namibia is a semi-presidential representative democratic republic. It runs direct elections every five years for the position of the president and seats in the National Assembly, and every six years for the Regional Councils and the distribution of seats in local authorities. The National Council is elected indirectly by the constituency councillors of Namibia's 14 regions.

The current direct elections determining political positions are the 2024 Namibian general election for president and National Assembly, and the 2025 Namibian local and regional elections for Regional Councils and local authorities.

== Electoral system ==
Namibia elects on national level a head of state - the president - and a legislature. The president is elected for a five-year term by the people. The Parliament is bicameral in nature. Until 2014 the National Assembly had 78 members of which 72 were elected by direct popular vote using the proportional representation and a maximum of 6 non-voting members are appointed by the president. The members are elected for a five-year term. Since then the number of elected seats to the National Assembly was increased to 96 to allow for wider representation of the population, although the real reason behind it was the newly introduced gender equality system of the ruling party SWAPO. This system would have pushed several male members out of parliament. The National Council of Namibia has 42 members, indirectly elected for a five-year term in triple-seat constituencies (regions). Namibia is a democratic but one party dominant state with the South West Africa People's Organisation (SWAPO) in power.

Opposition parties are allowed, but are widely considered to have no real chance of gaining power. Upon independence of Namibia the territory inherited a populace divided along ethnic groups, and political parties representing these ethnicities. While this is also true for SWAPO which was founded to represent the Ovambo people, the ruling party has garnered national support due to its role in the fight for independence. Opposition parties have had little success in national elections, and their representation in the lower house has been dwindling steadily.

=== Regional elections ===
Elections for Namibian regional councils are held using the first-past-the-post electoral system. Voters in each constituency elect one councillor to represent them on their regional council. Local authority councillors are elected by a system of proportional representation. Local authority candidate lists have affirmative action requirements for women.

In the regional elections, for each of the 121 constituencies of Namibia one individual is elected to serve as constituency councillor and to represent their constituency in the respective regional council. The regional councils in turn select 3 representatives each to serve in the National Council. Local councillors are directly elected through secret ballots (regional elections) by the inhabitants of their constituencies. They occupy a constituency office in the main settlement of their district. However, once elected they keep their full-time job and are expected to run their constituencies after hours. Consequently, they receive allowances rather than salaries, although the remuneration does compare to a mid-range salaried position. Regional councillors are indirectly elected from and by the constituency councillors in each region. Each region sends three of their local councillors to represent their region in the National Council of Namibia.

=== Local elections ===
Local elections determine the population of the village, town, and city councils and have a direct influence on who will become mayor, as this position is elected among all councillors. Contrary to the regional elections, local elections in Namibia are determined by party, not by individual candidate. There are 57 local authorities for which elections are to be conducted.

== Electronic voting ==
The 2014 Namibian general election was the first in Africa to use electronic voting. The electronic system was also used in the 2015 Namibian local and regional elections and in the 2019 general election. However, the electronic voting machines (EVMs) that Namibia purchased do not implement the Voter-verified paper audit trail (VVPAT). The Supreme Court of Namibia ruled in 2020 that without a paper trail, usage of the EVMs in elections is unconstitutional. Starting with the 2020 Namibian local and regional elections the voting process thus uses paper ballots again.

== Latest elections ==
=== President ===
Candidate	Party	Votes	%
Netumbo Nandi-Ndaitwah	SWAPO	638,560	58.07
Panduleni Itula	Independent Patriots for Change	284,106	25.84
McHenry Venaani	Popular Democratic Movement	55,412	5.04
Bernadus Swartbooi	Landless People's Movement (Namibia)	51,160	4.65
Job Amupanda	Affirmative Repositioning	19,676	1.79
Hendrik Gaobaeb	United Democratic Front (Namibia)	12,604	1.15
Henk Mudge	Republican Party (Namibia)	8,988	0.82
Evilastus Kaaronda	SWANU	7,991	0.73
Ambrosius Kumbwa	All People's Party (Namibia)	5,197	0.47
Epafras Mukwiilongo	Namibian Economic Freedom Fighters	3,978	0.36
Festus Thomas	Body of Christ Party	3,641	0.33
Mike Kavekotora	Rally for Democracy and Progress (Namibia)	2,974	0.27
Erastus Shuumbwa	Action Democratic Movement Party (Namibia)	2,069	0.19
Sakaria Likuwa	United Namibians Party	2,013	0.18
Vaino Amuthenu	Congress of Democrats	1,213	0.11
Total		1,099,582	100.00

=== National Assembly ===
Party	Votes	%	Seats
SWAPO	583,300	53.38	51
Independent Patriots for Change	220,809	20.21	20
Affirmative Repositioning	72,227	6.61	7
Popular Democratic Movement	59,839	5.48	5
Landless People's Movement (Namibia)	56,971	5.21	5
United Democratic Front (Namibia)	16,828	1.54	1
Namibian Economic Freedom Fighters	11,743	1.07	1
SWANU	11,484	1.05	1
Republican Party (Namibia)	10,942	1.00	1
National Unity Democratic Organisation	10,687	0.98	1
All People's Party (Namibia)	7,219	0.66	1
National Democratic Party (Namibia)	6,647	0.61	1
Body of Christ Party	5,763	0.53	1
Rally for Democracy and Progress (Namibia)	3,308	0.30	0
National Empowerment Fighting Corruption	3,216	0.29	0
United Namibians Party	2,706	0.25	0
Action Democratic Movement Party (Namibia)	2,286	0.21	0
United People's Movement (Namibia)	2,143	0.20	0
Congress of Democrats	1,800	0.16	0
Christian Democratic Voice	1,452	0.13	0
National Patriotic Front (Namibia)	1,315	0.12	0
Appointed members	0	0.00	8
Total	1,092,685	100.00	104

=== Regional elections ===
There are 121 constituency councillors to be elected. In the 2015 Namibian local and regional elections the party affiliations of the elected councillors were:

Party	Seats	Change
South West Africa People's Organization	112	
National Unity Democratic Organisation	4	
Popular Democratic Movement	2	
United Democratic Front	1	
United People's Movement	1	
Independent politicians	1	
Total	121	

=== Local election ===
Local elections determine the population of the village, town, and city councils and have a direct influence on who will become mayor, as this position is elected among all councillors. Contrary to the regional elections, local elections in Namibia are determined by party, not by individual. There were 57 local authorities to be elected.

Party	Seats	Change
South West Africa People's Organization	277	
Popular Democratic Movement	41	
United Democratic Front	21	
Rally for Democracy and Progress	16	
National Unity Democratic Organisation	11	
All People's Party	4	
United People's Movement	3	
Civic Association of Henties Bay	1	
KRA	1	
Swakopmund Residents Association	1	
Congress of Democrats	1	
Rundu Concerned Citizens Association	1	
Total	378	

== History ==
Before Namibian independence the territory was known as South West Africa. All elections until 1978 were only for Whites, but even thereafter several parties representing the indigenous population, among them SWAPO, were excluded.

The first parliamentary elections were held in Namibia between 7 and 11 November 1989. These elections were for the Constituent Assembly of Namibia, which, upon independence in March 1990, became the National Assembly of Namibia. SWAPO won as expected, gaining 41 of the 72 seats, but not with the margin that was anticipated. Support for the opposition parties Democratic Turnhalle Alliance (DTA, 21 seats) and United Democratic Front (UDF, 4 seats) was strong in the former bantustans including Hereroland and Damaraland. Since then, election results of the opposition parties have been dwindling steadily. For instance the DTA gained 15 seats in 1994, 7 seats in 1999, and 4 seats in 2004. As of 2017 the state of the opposition has been described as "on the verge of collapsing".

In 2019 Hage Geingob won the presidential election and received a second term as president. His percentage of votes gained, however, dropped significantly from 87% in 2014 to 56% in 2019. While rural areas predominantly supported Geingob, many urban centres voted for the independent candidate, Panduleni Itula, who received 29% of the overall votes. No other candidate achieved a two-digit result. SWAPO, yet again, won a majority of seats in the National Assembly, but closely missed the threshold for a two-thirds majority, which it held since 1994. Consequently, opposition parties also gained seats, most prominently the PDM, which obtained 16 seats in the National Assembly. The PDM's 16.60% vote share is its best electoral performance since the 1994 election.

== See also ==
- Electoral calendar
- Electoral system
