= Ester Haikola-Sakaria =

Namibian politician and member of parliament

Member of the National Assembly of Namibia
- Incumbent
- Assumed office 20 March 2025

Personal details
- Party: Affirmative Repositioning

Ester Haikola-Sakaria is a Namibian politician from Affirmative Repositioning who has been a member of the Parliament of Namibia since 2025. She was elected in the 2024 Namibian general election. She was raised by her grandparents. She is the founder and director of the Wakapinya Environmental Education NGO.

== See also ==
- List of members of the 8th National Assembly of Namibia
