= Aina Hanganeni Kodi =

Namibian politician and member of parliament

Member of the National Assembly of Namibia
- Incumbent
- Assumed office 20 March 2025

Personal details
- Party: Landless People's Movement

Aina Hanganeni Kodi is a Namibian politician from the Landless People's Movement (Namibia) who has been a member of the Parliament of Namibia since 2025. She was elected in the 2024 Namibian general election.

== See also ==
- List of members of the 8th National Assembly of Namibia
