= Tuhafeni =

Tuhafeni is a name. People with the surname include:

- Cornelius Tuhafeni Ndjoba (1930–1982), Namibian chief
- Tuhafeni Kalangula (born 1986), Namibian politician
- Tuhafeni Kalola (born 1994), Namibian politician
- Vaino Tuhafeni Hangula, Namibian politician

== See also ==
- Tufeni
