= Elvis Lizazi =

Namibian politician (born 1980)

Member of the National Assembly of Namibia
- Incumbent
- Assumed office 20 March 2025

Personal details
- Born: 10 November 1980 (age 45) Katima Mulilo, Zambezi Region, Namibia
- Party: Independent Patriots for Change

Elvis Milunga Lizazi (born 10 November 1980) is a Namibian politician from Independent Patriots for Change who has been a member of the Parliament of Namibia since 2025. Lizazi serves as shadow minister for Justice and Labour Relations.

== See also ==
- List of members of the 8th National Assembly of Namibia
