= Dawid Eigub =

Namibian politician and member of parliament

Member of the National Assembly of Namibia
- Incumbent
- Assumed office 20 March 2025

Personal details
- Party: Landless People's Movement

Dawid Christiaan Eigub is a Namibian politician from the Landless People's Movement who has been a member of the Parliament of Namibia since 2025. He was elected in the 2024 Namibian general election. He serves as the Chief Whip for his party.

== See also ==
- List of members of the 8th National Assembly of Namibia
