= Erastus Mbumba Haitengela =

Namibian politician and member of parliament

Member of the National Assembly of Namibia
- Incumbent
- Assumed office 20 March 2025

Personal details
- Party: SWAPO

Erastus Mbumba Haitengela is a Namibian politician from SWAPO who has been a member of the Parliament of Namibia since 2025 and a member of the Cabinet of Namibia. He was the 30th candidate on the list in the 2024 Namibian general election. He served as the executive director of the Ministry of Sport, Youth and National Service. He serves as executive director of Education, Innovation, Arts and Culture.

== See also ==
- List of members of the 8th National Assembly of Namibia
