= Armas Amukoto =

Namibian politician and member of parliament

Member of the National Assembly of Namibia
- Incumbent
- Assumed office 20 March 2025

Personal details
- Born: 27 October 1973 (age 52) Onyaanya, Oshikoto Region, Namibia
- Party: Independent Patriots for Change

Armas Nangolo Amukoto (born 27 October 1973) is a Namibian politician from Independent Patriots for Change who has been a member of the Parliament of Namibia since 2025. He serves as Shadow Minister of urban and rural development. He is a former Omuthiya councillor.

== See also ==
- List of members of the 8th National Assembly of Namibia
