= Rodney Cloete =

Namibian politician and member of parliament

Member of the National Assembly of Namibia
- Incumbent
- Assumed office 20 March 2025

Personal details
- Born: 23 October Windhoek, Namibia
- Party: Independent Patriots for Change

Rodney Cloete (born 23 October) is a Namibian politician from Independent Patriots for Change who has been a member of the Parliament of Namibia since 2025. Cloete was born and raised in Windhoek. Cloete is a member of the shadow cabinet for international relations.

== See also ==
- List of members of the 8th National Assembly of Namibia
