= Rosa Mbinge-Tjeundo =

Namibian politician and member of parliament

Rosa Mbinge-Tjeundo Member of parliament

Member of the National Assembly of Namibia
- Incumbent
- Assumed office 20 March 2025

Personal details
- Born: 15 July 1972 (age 53)
- Party: Popular Democratic Movement

Kamutuwa Rosa Rosa Mbinge-Tjeundo (born 15 July 1972) is a Namibian politician from the Popular Democratic Movement who has been a member of the Parliament of Namibia since 2025. She was elected in the 2024 Namibian general election. She was mayor of Opuwo.

== See also ==
- List of members of the 8th National Assembly of Namibia
