= Fredrick Twiindileni Shitana =

Namibian politician and member of parliament

Member of the National Assembly of Namibia
- Incumbent
- Assumed office 20 March 2025

Personal details
- Born: 19 July 1985 (age 40) Okongo, Ohangwena Region, Namibia
- Party: Affirmative Repositioning

Fredrick Twiindileni Shitana (born 19 July 1985) is a Namibian politician from Affirmative Repositioning who has been a member of the Parliament of Namibia since 2025. He was born in the Ohangwena Region. He is known as an artist and activist.

== See also ==
- List of members of the 8th National Assembly of Namibia
