= Vilho Ihemba =

Namibian politician (born 1969)

Member of the National Assembly of Namibia
- Incumbent
- Assumed office 20 March 2025

Personal details
- Born: 17 October 1969 (age 56) Windhoek, Namibia
- Party: Independent Patriots for Change

Vilho Armo Jr Simweneni Ihemba (born 17 October 1969) is a Namibian politician from Independent Patriots for Change who has been a member of the Parliament of Namibia since 2025. He is a member of the shadow cabinet. He is deputy shadow minister for home affairs.

== See also ==
- List of members of the 8th National Assembly of Namibia
