= Ferdinand Hengombe =

Namibian politician and member of parliament

Member of the National Assembly of Namibia
- Incumbent
- Assumed office 20 March 2025

Personal details
- Born: 6 December 1979 (age 46) Walvis Bay, Erongo Region, Namibia
- Party: Independent Patriots for Change

Ferdinand Uazapi Hengombe (born 6 December 1979) is a Namibian politician from Independent Patriots for Change who has been a member of the Parliament of Namibia since 2025. He is a member of the Parliamentary Standing Committee on Natural Resources. He serves as Shadow Minister of Mines, Energy and Industry.

== See also ==
- List of members of the 8th National Assembly of Namibia
