= Lillian Lutuhezi =

Namibian politician and member of parliament

Member of the National Assembly of Namibia
- Incumbent
- Assumed office 20 March 2025

Personal details
- Born: 20 June 1977 (age 48) Makanga, Zambezi Region
- Party: Independent Patriots for Change

Lillian Muchenya Lutuhezi (born 20 June 1977) is a Namibian politician from the Independent Patriots for Change (IPC). In the Parliament of Namibia, she serves as shadow minister of gender equality and child welfare.

== See also ==
- List of members of the 8th National Assembly of Namibia
