= Michael Mulunga =

Namibian politician (born 1989)

Member of the National Assembly of Namibia
- Incumbent
- Assumed office 20 March 2025

Personal details
- Born: 24 April 1989 (age 37) Windhoek, Namibia
- Party: Independent Patriots for Change

Michael Mulunga (born 24 April 1989) is a Namibian politician from Independent Patriots for Change who has been a member of the Parliament of Namibia since 2025. Mulunga was born and raised in Windhoek. He previously worked in poultry.

== See also ==
- List of members of the 8th National Assembly of Namibia
