= Bertha Nghifikwa =

Namibian politician and member of parliament

Member of the National Assembly of Namibia
- Incumbent
- Assumed office 20 March 2025

Personal details
- Born: 23 August 1987 (age 38)
- Party: Independent Patriots for Change

Bertha Victoria Nghifikwa (born 23 August 1987) is a Namibian politician from Independent Patriots for Change who has been a member of the Parliament of Namibia since 2025. She serves as Shadow Minister for Education, Innovation, Youth, Sports, Arts and Culture.

== See also ==
- List of members of the 8th National Assembly of Namibia
