= Lilani Brinkman =

Namibian politician (born 1985)

Member of the National Assembly of Namibia
- Incumbent
- Assumed office 20 March 2025

Personal details
- Born: 18 October 1985 (age 40) Gibeon, Hardap Region
- Party: Independent Patriots for Change

Lilani Carlolintjie Brinkman (born 18 October 1985) is a Namibian politician from the Independent Patriots for Change (IPC). In the Parliament of Namibia, she serves as Shadow Minister of Health and Social Services.

== See also ==
- List of members of the 8th National Assembly of Namibia
