= Isra Kanyemba =

Namibian politician and member of parliament

Member of the National Assembly of Namibia
- Incumbent
- Assumed office 20 March 2025

Personal details
- Born: 23 January 1992 (age 34) Oshikuku, Namibia
- Party: Independent Patriots for Change

Isra Peter Nevermind Jelekeni Kanyemba (born 23 January 1992) is a Namibian politician from Independent Patriots for Change who has been a member of the Parliament of Namibia since 2025. He was 20th on the party list at the 2024 Namibian general election. He serves as Deputy Shadow Minister for Defence and Veteran Affairs.

== See also ==
- List of members of the 8th National Assembly of Namibia
