= Clemencia Coetzee =

Namibian politician and member of parliament

Member of the National Assembly of Namibia
- Incumbent
- Assumed office 20 March 2025

Personal details
- Party: SWAPO

Clemencia Emma Coetzee is a Namibian politician from SWAPO who has been a member of the Parliament of Namibia since 2025. She was elected in the 2024 Namibian general election. She is an advocate for affordable housing.

== See also ==
- List of members of the 8th National Assembly of Namibia
