= Otillie Haitota =

Namibian politician (born 1995)

Member of the National Assembly of Namibia
- Incumbent
- Assumed office 20 March 2025

Personal details
- Born: 26 January 1995 (age 31) Efidi-Ongwediva, Oshana Region, Namibia
- Party: Independent Patriots for Change

Ottilie Laimi Ndinelao Haitota (born 26 January 1995) is a Namibian politician from Independent Patriots for Change who has been a member of the Parliament of Namibia since 2025. She is a housing advocate.

== See also ==
- List of members of the 8th National Assembly of Namibia
