= Lucia Mbuti =

Namibian politician (born 1972)

Member of the National Assembly of Namibia
- Incumbent
- Assumed office 20 March 2025

Personal details
- Born: 18 December 1972 (age 53) Omaruru, Namibia
- Party: Independent Patriots for Change

Lucia Jaturirua Mbuti (born 18 December 1972) is a Namibian politician from the Independent Patriots for Change (IPC). In the Parliament of Namibia, she serves as a member.

== See also ==
- List of members of the 8th National Assembly of Namibia
