= Eneas Emvula =

Namibian politician and member of parliament

Member of the National Assembly of Namibia
- Incumbent
- Assumed office 20 March 2025

Personal details
- Born: 6 May 1974 (age 51) Windhoek, Khomas Region
- Party: Landless People's Movement

Eneas Emvula (born 6 May 1974) is a Namibian politician from the Landless People's Movement who has been a member of the Parliament of Namibia since 2025. He was elected in the 2024 Namibian general election.

== See also ==
- List of members of the 8th National Assembly of Namibia
