= Ricky Vries =

Namibian politician and member of parliament

Ricky Vries Member of parliament

Member of the National Assembly of Namibia
- Incumbent
- Assumed office 20 March 2025

Personal details
- Party: Popular Democratic Movement

Ricky Vries is a Namibian politician from the Popular Democratic Movement who has been a member of the Parliament of Namibia since 2025. He was the party's national chairperson. He was elected in the 2024 Namibian general election.

== See also ==
- List of members of the 8th National Assembly of Namibia
