= Tuulikki Abraham =

Namibian politician and member of parliament

Member of the National Assembly of Namibia
- Incumbent
- Assumed office 20 March 2025

Personal details
- Born: 20 July 1969 (age 56) Engela, Ohangwena Region
- Party: SWAPO

Tuulikki Abraham (born 20 July 1969) is a Namibian politician from SWAPO who has been a member of the Parliament of Namibia since 2025. She was 31st or 35th on the party list at the 2024 Namibian general election. She was previously a reporter for the Namibian Broadcasting Corporation.

== See also ==
- List of members of the 8th National Assembly of Namibia
