= Aloisius Kangulu =

Namibian politician and member of parliament

Member of the National Assembly of Namibia
- Incumbent
- Assumed office 20 March 2025

Personal details
- Born: 5 September 1978 (age 47)
- Party: Independent Patriots for Change

Aloisius Kangulu (born 5 September 1978) is a Namibian politician from Independent Patriots for Change who has been a member of the Parliament of Namibia since 2025. He is Shadow Minister of Defence.

== See also ==
- List of members of the 8th National Assembly of Namibia
