= Vetaruhe Kandorozu =

Namibian politician and member of parliament

Member of the National Assembly of Namibia
- Incumbent
- Assumed office 20 March 2025

Personal details
- Born: 9 November 1974 (age 51) Otjinene, Omaheke Region
- Party: National Unity Democratic Organisation

Vetaruhe Kandorozu (born 9 November 1974) is a Namibian politician from the National Unity Democratic Organisation who has been a member of the Parliament of Namibia since 2025. He was elected in the 2024 Namibian general election. He was previously a councillor in Okakarara Constituency.

== See also ==
- List of members of the 8th National Assembly of Namibia
