= Fenny Tutjavi =

Namibian politician and member of parliament

Member of the National Assembly of Namibia
- Incumbent
- Assumed office 20 March 2025

Personal details
- Born: 2003 (age 22–23)
- Party: SWAPO

Mbahimwa Fenny Tutjavi (born 2003) is a Namibian politician from SWAPO who has been a member of the Parliament of Namibia since 2025. She is the youngest member of parliament.

== See also ==
- List of members of the 8th National Assembly of Namibia
