= Austin Samupwa =

Namibian politician and member of parliament

Member of the National Assembly of Namibia
- Incumbent
- Assumed office 20 March 2025

Personal details
- Party: SWAPO

Austin Machana Samupwa is a Namibian politician from SWAPO who has been a member of the Parliament of Namibia since 2025. He grew up in Zambezi Region. He was permanent secretary of SWAPO. He left that position in 2023.

== See also ==
- List of members of the 8th National Assembly of Namibia
