= Dino Ballotti =

Namibian politician and member of parliament

Member of the National Assembly of Namibia
- Incumbent
- Assumed office 20 March 2025

Personal details
- Born: 3 January 1987 (age 39) Windhoek, Khomas Region
- Party: SWAPO

Dino Ballotti (born 3 January 1987) is a Namibian politician from SWAPO who has been a member of the Parliament of Namibia since 2025. He is deputy minister of education, innovation, youth, sport, arts, and culture.

== See also ==
- List of members of the 8th National Assembly of Namibia
