= Linda Mbwale =

Namibian politician and member of parliament

Member of the National Assembly of Namibia
- Incumbent
- Assumed office 20 March 2025

Personal details
- Born: 31 October 1966 (age 59) Ruacana, Omusati Region
- Party: SWAPO

Linda Mbwale (born 31 October 1966) is a Namibian politician from SWAPO who has been a member of the Parliament of Namibia since 2025. Mbwale is Deputy Minister of Gender Equality and Child Welfare in the Cabinet of Namibia. She was previously mayor of Ruacana.

== See also ==
- List of members of the 8th National Assembly of Namibia
