= Tobie Aupindi =

Namibian politician and member of parliament

Member of the National Assembly of Namibia
- Incumbent
- Assumed office 20 March 2025

Personal details
- Born: 12 May 1974 (age 51)
- Party: SWAPO

Tobie Aupindi (born 12 May 1974) is a Namibian politician from SWAPO who has been a member of the Parliament of Namibia since 2025.

== See also ==
- List of members of the 8th National Assembly of Namibia
