= Ruth Masake =

Namibian politician and member of parliament

Member of the National Assembly of Namibia
- Incumbent
- Assumed office 20 March 2025

Personal details
- Born: 19 December 1979 (age 46) Sikubi, Zambezi Region
- Party: SWAPO

Ruth (Ruthy) Masake (born 19 December 1979) is a Namibian politician from South West Africa People's Organisation (SWAPO). She has been a member of the Parliament of Namibia since 2025.

Masake is Deputy Minister of Agriculture, Fisheries, Water and Land Reform in the Cabinet of Namibia.

== See also ==
- List of members of the 8th National Assembly of Namibia
