= Elder Filipe =

Namibian politician and member of parliament

Member of the National Assembly of Namibia
- Incumbent
- Assumed office 20 March 2025

Personal details
- Born: 6 October 1982 (age 43)
- Party: SWAPO

Elder Filipe (born 6 October 1982) is a Namibian politician from SWAPO who has been a member of the Parliament of Namibia since 2025.

Filipe was previously Erasmus Shalihaxwe Grootfontein Constituency Councillor. He is an opponent of the recognition of same-sex unions in Namibia.

== See also ==
- List of members of the 8th National Assembly of Namibia
