= Rodrick Likando =

Namibian politician and member of parliament

Member of the National Assembly of Namibia
- Incumbent
- Assumed office 20 March 2025

Personal details
- Born: 10 July 1979 (age 46) Musanga, Zambezi Region, Namibia
- Party: Independent Patriots for Change

Rodrick Liwela Likando (born 10 July 1979) is a Namibian politician from Independent Patriots for Change who has been a member of the Parliament of Namibia since 2025. He served as shadow environment minister. On 20 February 2026, he was appointed chief whip.

== See also ==
- List of members of the 8th National Assembly of Namibia
