= Tuhafeni Kalangula =

Namibian politician and member of parliament

Member of the National Assembly of Namibia
- Incumbent
- Assumed office 20 March 2025

Personal details
- Born: 1 September 1986 (age 39) Oniimwandi, Oshana Region, Namibia
- Party: Independent Patriots for Change

Tuhafeni Nelson Kalangula (born 1 September 1986) is a Namibian politician from Independent Patriots for Change who has been a member of the Parliament of Namibia since 2025. He serves as shadow minister of works and transport.

== See also ==
- List of members of the 8th National Assembly of Namibia
