= Justina Jonas =

Namibian politician and member of parliament

Member of the National Assembly of Namibia
- Incumbent
- Assumed office 20 March 2025

Personal details
- Born: 10 February 1978 (age 47)
- Party: SWAPO

Justina Jonas (born 10 February 1978) is a Namibian politician from SWAPO. She has been a member of the Parliament of Namibia since 2025. She is a trade unionist.

== See also ==
- List of members of the 8th National Assembly of Namibia
