= Iita =

IITA or Iita can refer to

- Institute of Information Technology Advancement, South Korea.
- International Institute of Tropical Agriculture, Nigeria
- Hilma Iita, Namibian politician
- Werner Iita, Namibian politician
