= Elifas Dingara =

Namibian politician and member of parliament

Member of the National Assembly of Namibia
- In office 2010 – 28 February 2026

Personal details
- Born: 10 October 1964 (age 61) Mayara, Kavango East Region
- Party: SWAPO

Elifas Dingara (born 10 October 1964) is a Namibian politician from SWAPO who was a member of the Parliament of Namibia from 2010 to 2026. He resigned in 2026.

== See also ==
- List of members of the 8th National Assembly of Namibia
