= John Louw Mouton =

Namibian politician (born 1994)

Member of the National Assembly of Namibia

Personal details
- Party: Independent Patriots for Change

John Louw Mouton (born 25 July 1994) is a Namibian politician from Independent Patriots for Change who has been a member of the Parliament of Namibia since 2025.

== See also ==
- List of members of the 8th National Assembly of Namibia
