= Likando =

Likando is a surname. Notable people with the surname include:

- John Likando (born 1977), Namibian politician
- Rodrick Likando (born 1979), Namibian politician

== See also ==
- Likando Kalaluka
