= Abed Hishoono =

Namibian politician (born 1974)

Member of the National Assembly of Namibia
- Incumbent
- Assumed office 20 March 2025

Personal details
- Born: 1 June 1974 (age 51) Ohangwena Region, Namibia
- Party: Independent Patriots for Change

Abednego Linoovene Hishoono (born 1 June 1974) is a Namibian politician from Independent Patriots for Change who has been a member of the Parliament of Namibia since 2025. He is the Deputy Shadow Minister in the Ministry of Education, Innovation, Youth, Sports, Arts and Culture. His father Kanana Hishoono was presidential adviser and secretary of the SWAPO Party Elders Council.

== See also ==
- List of members of the 8th National Assembly of Namibia
