= Michael Mwashindange =

Namibian politician (born 1994)

The Honourable Michael Mwashindange
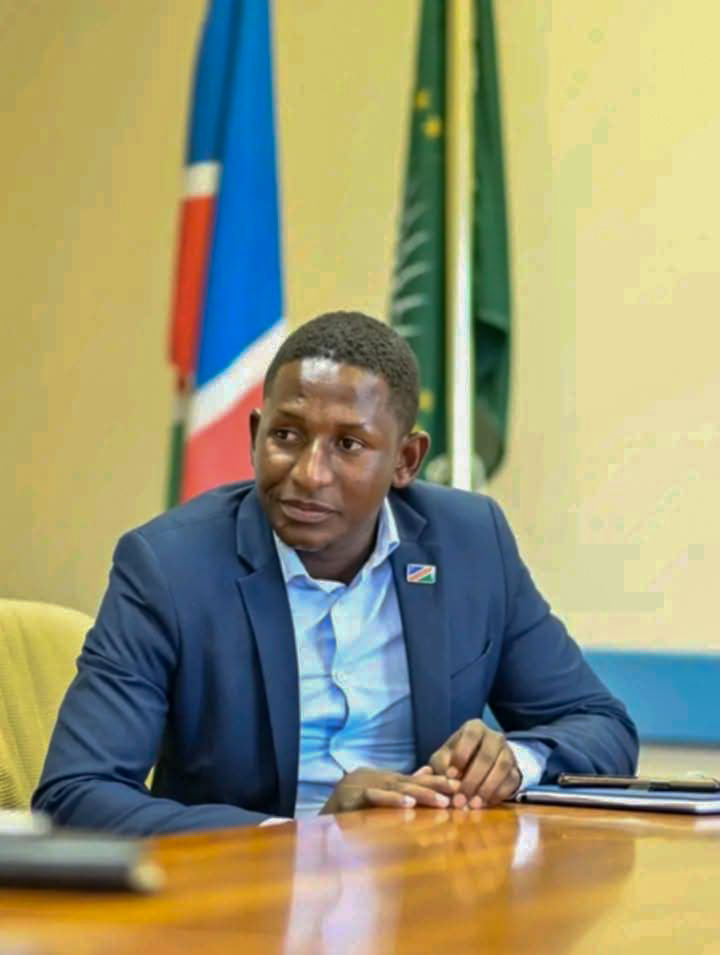

Member of the National Assembly of Namibia
- Incumbent
- Assumed office 21 March 2025
- President: Netumbo Nandi-Ndaitwah

Personal details
- Born: July 7, 1994 (age 32) Onambutu Village
- Party: Independent Patriots for Change
- Education: International University of Management

Michael Mwashindange (born 7 July 1994 at Onambutu Village, Eenhana Constituency, Ohangwena Region) is a Namibian politician, youth leader, and elected legislator in the 8th National Assembly of Namibia. He is a member of the Independent Patriots for Change.

Mwashindange matriculated at Ongha Senior Secondary in 2014. He obtained a honours degree in financial management from the International University of Management in 2019. He also holds a national certificate in counselling services and a national diploma in community counselling both from Atlantic Training Institution.
