= Salomon April =

Namibian politician and member of parliament

Member of the National Assembly of Namibia
- Incumbent
- Assumed office 20 March 2025

Personal details
- Born: 22 April 1966 (age 60) Mariental, Hardap Region
- Party: SWAPO
- Education: University of Cambridge; University of Kwazulu-Natal; University of Stellenbosch; University of Kwazulu-Natal

Salomon Menthos April (born 22 April 1966) is a Namibian politician from SWAPO who has been a member of the Parliament of Namibia since 2025. April was previously governor of Hardap Region. He is a religious leader by profession.

== See also ==
- List of members of the 8th National Assembly of Namibia
