= Nono Katjingisua =

Namibian politician and member of parliament

Member of the National Assembly of Namibia
- Incumbent
- Assumed office 20 March 2025

Personal details
- Born: 20 January 1967 (age 59) Gobabis, Omaheke Region
- Party: SWAPO

Nono Katjingisua (born 20 January 1967) is a Namibian politician from SWAPO. She has been a member of the Parliament of Namibia since 2025. She is the chair of the Gender Equality, Health and Social Welfare Committee.

== See also ==
- List of members of the 8th National Assembly of Namibia
