= Marta Axser-Itope =

Namibian politician and member of parliament

Member of the National Assembly of Namibia
- Incumbent
- Assumed office 20 March 2025

Personal details
- Born: 8 October 1987 (age 38)
- Party: SWAPO

Marta Axser-Itope (born 8 October 1987) is a Namibian politician from SWAPO. She has been a member of the Parliament of Namibia since 2025.

== See also ==
- List of members of the 8th National Assembly of Namibia
