= Gaudentia Krohne =

Namibian politician and member of parliament

Member of the National Assembly of Namibia
- Incumbent
- Assumed office 20 March 2025

Personal details
- Born: 3 July 1972 (age 53) Windhoek, Khomas Region
- Party: SWAPO

Gaudentia Kröhne (born 3 July 1972) is a Namibian politician from the South West Africa People's Organisation (SWAPO). In the Parliament of Namibia, she serves as deputy minister of Industries, Mines and Energy. She grew up in poverty in Tses. She was previously mayor of Keetmanshoop from 2015 to 2020, and again an ordinary councillor in the municipality until March 2025.

== See also ==
- List of members of the 8th National Assembly of Namibia
