= Modestus Atshipara =

Namibian politician and member of parliament

Member of the National Assembly of Namibia
- Incumbent
- Assumed office 20 March 2025

Personal details
- Born: 1 March 1966 (age 60) Amuthanga-Okatana, Oshana Region
- Party: SWAPO

Modestus Atshipara (born 1 March 1966) is a Namibian politician from SWAPO who has been a member of the Parliament of Namibia since 2025. He is an advocate for inclusive education.

== See also ==
- List of members of the 8th National Assembly of Namibia
