= ISRA =

ISRA or Isra may refer to:

- Al-Isra, 17th chapter of the Quran
- Isra Kanyemba (born 1992), Namibian politician
- Islamic Sciences and Research Academy of Australia
- Institut sénégalais de recherches agricoles, the Senegalese Institute for Agricultural Research
- International Society for Research on Aggression, a psychology organization
- International Shari’ah Research Academy for Islamic Finance, a financial research institute in Malaysia
- Isra and Mi'raj, the journey out and home, an Islamic belief
- Important Shark and Ray Areas
