= Hilaria Mukapuli =

Namibian legislator

- Ndiiwana

Member of the National Assembly of Namibia
- In office 2020–2025
- Incumbent
- Assumed office 2020

Mayor of Lüderitz
- In office 2016 – 2019

Personal details
- Born: 4 April 1969 (age 57) Lüderitz
- Citizenship: Namibia
- Party: Swapo Party of Namibia
- Occupation: Member of Parliament

Hilaria Ndiiwana Mukapuli (born 4 April 1969) is a Namibian politician and a legislator in the Parliament of Namibia, as Member of National Assembly serving the 2020–2025 term, representing SWAPO Party of Namibia. Mukapuli also served as a mayor of Lüderitz from 2016 to 2019.

== Education and early career ==
Ndiiwana was born in Lüderitz, where she attained her primary education at Diaz Primary school. She also attended school at Andimba Toivo Ya Toivo Secondary School ,formerly known as Oluno Secondary School, and Nangolo Secondary School. In her early career, Mukapuli worked in various capacities such as a fish processor at NovaNam, manager of her family's business, a community counselor and HIV rapid tester at the Ministry of Health and Social Services, and a community social worker for an NGO where she provided counseling and psychological support to a variety of people, including mothers who were HIV-positive and paid for vulnerable children's school expenses.

== Political career ==
In 2010, Mukapuli was elected as councilor in the Lüderitz local authority council. In 2013, she was elected to serve as the district coordinator for the Swapo Party in Lüderitz. Mukapuli in 2015 was elected as a mayor of Lüderitz and served at that position until 2019. As mayor, she advocated against abuse among school children and youth. In the 2019 general election, Mukapuli was elected to serve as member of Parliament in the National Assembly.
