= Werner Iita =

Namibian politician and member of parliament

Member of the National Assembly of Namibia
- Incumbent
- Assumed office 20 March 2025

Personal details
- Born: 20 April 1963 (age 62) Omulathitu, Oshana Region
- Party: SWAPO

Werner Iita (born 20 April 1963) is a Namibian politician from SWAPO who has been a member of the Parliament of Namibia since 2025. He is a former Oshakati chief executive.

== See also ==
- List of members of the 8th National Assembly of Namibia
