= Vaino Tuhafeni Hangula =

Namibian politician and member of parliament

Member of the National Assembly of Namibia
- Incumbent
- Assumed office 20 March 2025

Personal details
- Party: Affirmative Repositioning

Vaino Tuhafeni Twapewavali Hangula is a Namibian politician from Affirmative Repositioning who has been a member of the Parliament of Namibia since 2025. Hangula is a marketing and communications specialist. He is the Chief Whip for the Affirmative Repositioning.

== See also ==
- List of members of the 8th National Assembly of Namibia
