= Itula =

Itula is both a given name and a surname. Notable people with the name include:

- Itula Mili (born 1973), American football player
- Panduleni Itula (born 1957), Namibian politician
