= Mouton =

Mouton may refer to:

== Places ==
- Mouton, Charente, a commune in France
- Mouton, Louisiana, an unincorporated community in the United States
- Mons Mouton, a plateau on the lunar south pole

== People ==
- Alexandre Mouton (1804–1885), United States Senator from, and Governor of, Louisiana
- Alfred Mouton (1829–1864), Confederate general in the American Civil War
- Charles Mouton (1617–before 1699), French baroque lutenist and composer
- Eugène Mouton (1823–1902), French fiction writer, also known as Mérinos
- François Henri Mouton (1804–1876), French and Sikh army officer
- Gabriel Mouton (1618–1694), French scientist who suggested a system of measurement that was the inspiration for the metric system
- Georges Mouton Comte de Lobau (1770–1838), French soldier and political figure, Marshal of France
- Henri Mouton (1869–1935), French scientist known for the Cotton-Mouton effect
- James Mouton (born 1968), American former Major League Baseball player
- Jane Mouton (1930–1987), American specialist in the science and psychology of management
- Jannie Mouton, South African billionaire
- Jean Mouton (c. 1459–1522), French composer of the Renaissance era
- John Louw Mouton (born 1994), Namibian politician
- Jonas Mouton (born 1988), American former National Football League player
- Lyle Mouton (born 1969), American former Major League Baseball player
- Melba Roy Mouton (1929–1990), American NASA scientist
- Michèle Mouton (born 1951), French former rally driver
- Ray Mouton (1947–2026), American lawyer

== Other uses ==
- Mouton fur, a sheepskin that has been made to resemble beaver or seal
- Mouton Publishers, later Mouton de Gruyter, later De Gruyter Mouton, a linguistics publishing house, now a De Gruyter imprint
- Château Mouton Rothschild, a Bordeaux wine producer, formerly named simply Mouton

== See also ==
- Mutton
