= Hilma Iita =

Namibian politician and member of parliament

Member of the National Assembly of Namibia
- Incumbent
- Assumed office 20 March 2025

Personal details
- Born: Oshakati, Oshana Region
- Party: SWAPO

Hilma Naambo Iita is a Namibian politician from SWAPO. She has been a member of the Parliament of Namibia since 2025.

== See also ==
- List of members of the 8th National Assembly of Namibia
