= Imms Nashinge =

Namibian politician (born 1983)

Member of National Assembly
- Incumbent
- Assumed office 20 March 2025
- President: Netumbo Nandi-Ndaitwah
- In office 20 March 2025 – 20 March 2030

Personal details
- Born: December 2, 1982 (age 43) Namibia
- Education: University of Namibia

Immanuel (Imms) Nashinge is a Namibian politician who serves as Member of Parliament in the Namibian National Assembly. He is also the national spokesperson of Namibia's main opposition political party, Independent Patriots for Change.

== Early life ==
Nashinge was born was born in the village of Onandjamba in the Omusati region in 1983, he did his primary education there before moving to Oshikoto region to live with his uncle. Later, he moved to Windhoek and completed his secondary education at Concordia College.

== Politics ==
Nashinge became spokesperson of the Independent Patriots For Change at its formation in 2020. He was elected to parliament in 2024 and was sworn in on 20 March 2025.
