= Hangula =

Hangula is a surname. Notable people with the surname include:

- Lazarus Hangula, Namibian academic
- Lucas Hangula, Namibian police officer
- Vaino Tuhafeni Hangula, Namibian politician

== See also ==
- Hangul
