= John Likando =

Namibian politician

John Musialela Likando (born 11 March, 1977) is a Namibian politician. He is currently a Member of Parliament in the 8th National Assembly of Namibia. Likando has been constituency councillor of Kabbe South from 2015 to 2025, and in both these legislative periods member of the National Council as one of three councillors representing Zambezi Region.

== Early life and education ==
Likando is a qualified electrical technician and received his education Polytechnic of Namibia, currently known as the Namibia University of Science and Technology (NUST). He also holds a High Certificate in Public Relations from MidRand University and a Certificate in Project Planning and Management, while studying for a B.Com. at the University of South Africa (UNISA).

== Political career ==
Before entering politics, Likando worked as a civil contractor and project manager in technical fields. From 2006 to 2012, Likando served as the longest serving mayor of Katima Mulilo.

In the 2015 regional elections, he won and became the local councillor of Kabbe South Constituency, representing the South West Africa People's Organisation (SWAPO). He was re-elected as a regional councillor in 2020, allowing him to serve two terms. In both these legislative periods Likando was elected to represent Zambezi Region in the National Council as one of three councillors from that region.

In 2024, at the South West Africa People's Organization (SWAPO) elective congress, Likando was added to the party’s candidate list for the National Assembly of Namibia at #51. SWAPO won exactly 51 seats in the 2024 Namibian general election, making Likando the last SWAPO candidate to join the National Assembly. The legislative period started on 21 March 2025. In accordance with Namibian electoral regulations, his designation as a candidate required him to resign from his councillor position before 21 March 2025, thereby creating a vacancy in his constituency and in the National Council.
