= Winnie Moongo =

Namibian politician

Winnie Moongo MP

Member of the National Assembly of Namibia
- Incumbent
- Assumed office 20 March 2020

Personal details
- Party: Popular Democratic Movement
- Profession: Politician

Winnie Moongo is a Namibian politician who has served in the National Assembly of Namibia since March 2020. She is a member of the Popular Democratic Movement.

== Political career ==
In September 2019, Moongo was placed on the Popular Democratic Movement's list of parliamentary candidates for the November general election. She was elected to the National Assembly when the PDM won 16 seats.

Moongo was sworn in as a Member of Parliament on 20 March 2020. She is one of the younger members of parliament. On 9 October 2020, Moongo put forward a motion, in which she called on parliamentarians to support the creation of a national sex offenders' registry.
