= Onderombapa =

- Settlement
- Location in Namibia
- Coordinates: 23°11′S 19°33′E
- Country: Namibia
- Region: Omaheke Region
- Constituency: Aminuis Constituency
- Elevation: 4,173 ft (1,272 m)
- Time zone: UTC+2 (South African Standard Time)
- Climate: BWh

Onderombapa is a settlement and cattle post in the remote East of Namibia in Omaheke Region. It belongs to the Aminuis electoral constituency.

This place is one hour 45 minutes drive from the regional capital Gobabis. It has a clinic and a few general dealers. The Pamue Farmers Cooperative originated from this place. There is a National Unity Democratic Organisation (NUDO) office in Onderombapa.
