= Eenhana Constituency =

Electoral constituency in the Ohangwena region of northern Namibia

Coordinates: 17°28′S 16°20′E

Eenhana constituency (red) in the Ohangwena Region of Namibia

Eenhana is an electoral constituency in the Ohangwena Region of Namibia, on the border to Angola. It had 15,912 registered voters in 2020. The constituency covers an area of 1,112 km^{2} (429 sq mi) and contains the town of Eenhana and the surrounding area. The constituency office is located in Eenhana. The constituency had a population of 21,089 in 2011, up from 18,690 in 2001.

== Politics ==
In all constituencies of former Owamboland, Namibia's ruling SWAPO Party has dominated elections since independence. In the 2004 regional election SWAPO candidate Karlous Max Shinohamba received 4,475 of the 4,817 votes cast.

In the 2015 regional election SWAPO won by a landslide. Its candidate Nehemiah Haufiku gathered 6,113 votes, while the only opposition candidate, Dawid Johannes of the Rally for Democracy and Progress (RDP), received 188 votes. The 2020 regional election was also won by the SWAPO candidate. Olivia Tuyenikelao Hanghuwo received 6,021 votes, far ahead of Abed Hishoono of the Independent Patriots for Change (IPC), an opposition party formed in August 2020, who obtained 926 votes.
