= Onhokolo =

Settlement in the Omusati region of northern Namibia

Onhokolo is a settlement of about 1,000 inhabitants in the north of Namibia in Omusati Region. It is situated 25 kilometres (16 mi) from the regional capital Outapi and belongs to the Anamulenge electoral constituency. Onhokolo is not connected to the water grid; villagers dig wells to draw water from.
