= Sharonice Busch =

Namibian politician (born 1988)

The Honourable Sharonice Busch

Member of the National Assembly of Namibia
- Incumbent
- Assumed office 21 March 2025
- President: Netumbo Nandi-Ndaitwah

Personal details
- Born: Namibia
- Party: SWAPO

Sharonice Busch is a Namibian politician who serves as Member of Parliament in the National Assembly of Namibia. Previously, she was Executive Chairperson of the National Youth Council of Namibia. She also served as Secretary General of the Namibia National Students Organization.

== Youth leadership ==
Busch served as Chair of the Namibian youth parliament in her formative years. She then joined the Nanso where she went on to be elected Secretary General of the students organization. In 2015, she was appointed as personal assistant to then Namibian President Hage Geingob.

== Politics ==
In 2020, Busch was appointed Executive Chairperson of the National Youth Council of Namibia, leaving her role at the Namibian Presidency. She is an active member of the ruling SWAPO party where she serves in the party's main decision-making body, the SWAPO Party Central Committee. In 2024, Busch was elected to Parliament after placing high on SWAPO's electoral college parliamentary slots.
