= Tuhafeni Kalola =

Namibian politician (born 2/2/1994)

Member of the National Assembly of Namibia
- Incumbent
- Assumed office 21 March 2025
- President: Netumbo Nandi-Ndaitwah

Personal details
- Born: 2 February 1994 (age 32) Ovamboland, Namibia
- Party: Affirmative Repositioning
- Education: University of Namibia

Tuhafeni Kalola (born 2 February 1994) is a Namibian politician who serves as Member of Parliament in the National Assembly of Namibia. Previously, he was President of the UNAM SRC in 2018.

== Students politics ==
Kalola joined students politics at the University of Namibia in 2016, raising through the student politics ranks to become President of the UNAM SRC. He then joined a Namibia National Students Union sprinter group, the Namibia Students Union which broke away from Nanso claiming lack of leadership.

== Politics ==
While at the University of Namibia, Kalola joined the Affirmative Repositioning movement, a land and youth movement led by University of Namibia lecturer Job Amupanda. In 2024, the AR formed into a political party and Kalola was elected to Parliament representing the Affirmative Repositioning movement.
