= Martin Lukato =

Namibian politician and farmer

Martin Lukato Lukato (born 2 December 1960) is a Namibian politician, headman and farmer, currently serving as a legislator in the 8th National Assembly of Namibia since 20 March 2025. He has been a leader of the National Democratic Party (NDP) since 2004.

== Life and career ==
Lukato was born at Anda village in Linyanti Constituency of Zambezi Region. He was baptized on 22 June 1972 and is a member of the Seventh-day Adventist Church. At the age of 19, Lukato served in the South African police force during the apartheid era in Namibia. At independence, Lukato was absorbed into a Namibian police force and resigned in 2002 after 12 years of service. He is currently serving as headman of Queensland village in Linyanti as well as a member of the sub-kuta that governs the Makanga area in the Zambezi Region. After the 2024 Namibian General Election, his party secured a seat in the parliament of Namibia, thus he is poised to become a legislator in the national assembly.

Lukato is a father of 12 children and has been married to Edith Lukato for over 35 years.
