= Erastus Shuumbwa =

Namibian politician

Erastus Shuumbwa MP

Member of the National Assembly of Namibia
- Incumbent
- Assumed office 20 March 2020

Personal details
- Born: Erastus Shuumbwa; 24 August 1974 (age 52) Ondukutu, South West Africa
- Party: All People's Party
- Education: Triumphant College
- Occupation: Member of Parliament
- Profession: Businessman; Farmer; Politician

Erastus Shuumbwa (born 24 August 1974) is a Namibian businessman, farmer and politician. He served as a Member of the National Assembly of Namibia for the All People's Party since March 2020. He was the party's parliamentary chief whip. Shuumbwa was suspended from APP early this year and later joined Action Democratic Movement (ADM).

== Biography ==
Erastus Shuumbwa was born on 24 August 1974 in Ondukutu, South West Africa. He studied law at Triumphant College. He is a businessman and a farmer.

Shuumbwa joined the All People's Party and was elected to the National Assembly in November 2019. He took office as an MP on 20 March 2020. He served as the party's chief whip.
