= Ambrosius Kumbwa =

Namibian politician and member of parliament

Member of the National Assembly of Namibia
- Incumbent
- Assumed office 20 March 2025

Personal details
- Born: 11 April 1963 (age 62)
- Party: All People's Party

Ambrosius Kumbwa (born 11 April 1963) is a Namibian politician who is leader of the All People's Party. He has been a member of the Parliament of Namibia since 2025. He was elected in the 2024 Namibian general election.

== See also ==
- List of members of the 8th National Assembly of Namibia
