= Phillipus Katamelo =

Namibian politician (born 1974)

Deputy Speaker of National Assembly
- Incumbent
- Assumed office 21 March 2025
- President: Netumbo Nandi-Ndaitwah
- Preceded by: Loide Kasingo

Personal details
- Born: 28 September 1974 (age 51) Gobabis
- Party: SWAPO

Phillipus Wido Katamelo (born 28 September 1974) is a Namibian politician who is currently serving as the Deputy Speaker of the 8th National Assembly of Namibia since 21 March 2025. He has served as a member of 7th National Assembly of Namibia from 2020 to 2025 and a member of the National Council of Namibia since 2010 for Omaheke Region.

== Early life and education ==
Phillipus Katamelo was born on 28 September 1974 in Gobabis, Omaheke region. He matriculated at the Gobabis Winnie du Plessis High School in 1992. Katamelo attended a management development program at Stellenbosch University in 2007, national diploma in electrical engineering from Cape Peninsula University of Technology. Additionally, Katamelo holds a certificate in Public Administration.

== Career ==
Between 2002 and 2005, Katemelo was a vice chairperson of the NAPWU Telecom executive committee. Since 2002, he has served as a SWAPO Party regional treasurer.
