= McHenry Venaani =

Namibian politician (born 1977)

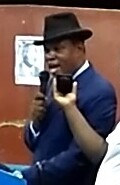
- Venaani in 2017

President of the Popular Democratic Movement
- Incumbent
- Assumed office 9 September 2013
- Preceded by: Katuutire Kaura

Personal details
- Born: 8 September 1977 (age 48) Windhoek, South West Africa
- Party: PDM
- Spouse: Claodina Venaani (after 2005)
- Relations: Mike Venaani (father)
- Children: 2
- Education: University of Wolverhampton

McHenry Venaani (born 8 September 1977) is a Namibian politician and the president of the Popular Democratic Movement, a party with five seats in the National Assembly of Namibia and one seat in the National Council of Namibia. Venaani was a presidential candidate in the 2024 Namibian general election and came in third. Venaani has been a member of the National Assembly from 2002 to 2010, in 2014, and since 2015. At the time of his appointment in 2002, he was Namibia's youngest MP. He was one of the three candidates standing for election as Paramount Chief of the Ovaherero Traditional Authority in January 2023, competing against Hoze Riruako and Mike Kavekotora.

== Education ==
Born in Windhoek, Namibia, Venaani matriculated in 1995 at Dawid Bezuidenhout High School in Khomasdal, Windhoek. He holds a Diploma in International Trade Law from Holborn College, UK (2002) and a Diploma in Constitutional Law from Holborn College, UK (1999). Diploma in Business Law, Classic College (1997).

In 2018, Venaani announced that the Commonwealth University in London, England, had awarded a Doctor of Laws (LL.D.) honoris causa to him "for his service, selflessness and other outstanding contributions as Namibia's leader of the official opposition in parliament". Within days, the honorary doctorate, the institution conferring it, and the professor awarding the degree were all exposed to be fake. Frederico Links, researcher at the Namibian Institute for Public Policy Research, subsequently questioned Venaani's "political ethics [...] wisdom and maturity".

== Career ==
Considered a rising star in the Democratic Turnhalle Alliance (DTA), Venaani ran for the top position in the party in 2005 against Katuutire Kaura. In that election, Venaani lost his position as party secretary general. In November 2008, he retook his position as secretary general, beating Alois Gende by a margin of 111 to 35 in party elections.

Venaani was placed on DTA's electoral list before the 2009 general election, but the party did not receive enough votes for his re-election. In the 2013 DTA elective central committee meeting, Venaani defeated Kaura by a margin of 96 to 52 and assumed the party presidency. When Kaura was expelled from the DTA in February 2014, Venaani also took over his seat in Parliament, but a court case brought by Kaura days after the decision was not contested by the DTA, and Kaura was reinstated both as parliamentarian and party member. Venaani re-entered parliament in March 2015 after the 2014 election as a top-placed member of the DTA.

On 4 November 2017, days after its 40th anniversary, the DTA was renamed the Popular Democratic Movement at Venaani's suggestion. This was done to facilitate the modernisation of the party and to shed its "colonial" name.

In the 2019 Namibian general election, Venaani ran as the presidential candidate of the strongest opposition party. He gathered a disappointing 5.3% of the popular vote, coming in as a distant third behind Hage Geingob and Panduleni Itula. His party, however, achieved a very strong result and gained 16 seats in the National Assembly, up 11 from the previous election.

He was a presidential candidate in the 2024 Namibian general election. He came in third place following Panduleni Itula with 55,422 votes.

== Beliefs ==
Venaani has spoken out against corruption, arguing that corruption is "a monstrous hydra that eats away the soul of the Namibian nation and degrades their dignity" and pledged to focus on anti-corruption if elected President of Namibia.

In 2013, Venaani called for more acceptance and advancement of LGBT rights in Namibia.

== Personal life ==
He has been married to Cloudina Venaani since 2005 and has two children. Cloudina is a social scientist who has worked for the United Nations and is now responsible for the Global Fund-supported program on adolescent girls and young women (AGYW).

Party political offices
| Preceded by Katuutire Kaura | President of the Popular Democratic Movement; 2013–present | Incumbent |
| Preceded by Katuutire Kaura | PDM nominee for President of Namibia; 2014, 2019 | Most recent |
