= Evilastus Kaaronda =

Namibian trade unionist

- Born: Evilastus Kaaronda; 1974 or 1975 (age 50–51); Otjiwarongo
- Occupation: Trade Unionist
- Known for: Worker's rights

Evilastus Kaaronda (born November 1975 in Otjiwarongo) is a Namibian trade unionist and politician. He is president of the South West Africa National Union (SWANU) since May 2022 and since March 2023 occupies SWANU's sole seat in parliament.

Kaaronda is SWANU's presidential candidate for the 2024 Namibian general election. He previously served as the secretary general of the National Union of Namibian Workers (NUNW).

His criticisms include support on a people-oriented basic income grant, skepticism on the precarious short-term labour contracts proposed by the TIPEEG program, demands to hold accountable those who were responsible for the N$600 million Government Institutions Pension Fund (GIPF) lost through botched investments in a series of politically connected start-ups, and ultimately to improve the status of the workers rather than decrease them as incentive for foreign investment.

In April 2011, an investigation against Kaaronda was launched following allegations of misconduct; specifically, Kaaronda was alleged to have made unauthorized public statements which discredited NUNW-affiliated unions. In 2012, Kaaronda was fired from NUNW alongside its president Elias Manga, citing "gross non-compliance with regard to his duties and responsibilities", the "disunity, division and mistrust" on his part. They were replaced by Connie Pandeni and Alfred Angula. In 2014, Kaaronda was instrumental in founding a competing national trade union center, the Namibia National Labour Organisation (NANLO).
