= List of speakers of the National Assembly of Namibia =

Below is a list of speakers of the National Assembly of Namibia. Hage Geingob was the chairman of the Constituent Assembly until March 1990.

Name	Took office	Left office	Notes
Mose Penaani Tjitendero	21 March 1990	21 March 2005	
Theo-Ben Gurirab	21 March 2005	21 March 2015	
Peter Katjavivi	21 March 2015	21 March 2025	
Saara Kuugongelwa-Amadhila	21 March 2025	Present	
