= Bernadus Swartbooi =

Namibian politician

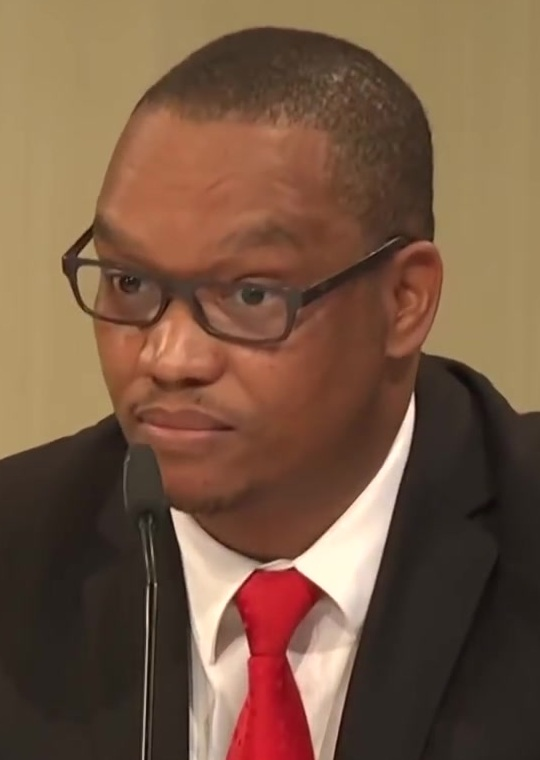
- Swartbooi in 2018

Leader of the Landless People's Movement
- Incumbent
- Assumed office 16 June 2018

Deputy Minister of Land Reform
- In office 21 September 2015 – 4 December 2016
- President: Hage Geingob
- Prime Minister: Saara Kuugongelwa-Amadhila
- Succeeded by: Priscilla Merjam Boois

Governor of ǁKaras Region
- In office 2010–2015
- President: Hifikepunye Pohamba
- Prime Minister: Hage Geingob
- Succeeded by: Lucia Basson

Personal details
- Born: 11 October 1977 (age 48) Tses, South West Africa (now Namibia)
- Party: LPM (since 2017); SWAPO (until 2017)
- Spouse: Moetie Swartbooi
- Education: University of Namibia

Bernadus Clinton Swartbooi (born 11 October 1977) is a Namibian politician.

Swartbooi was governor of ǁKaras Region before being appointed as Namibia's deputy Minister of Land Reform in 2015 by the late President Dr. Hage Geingob, a position he subsequently was forced to resign from in January 2017. On 27 July 2017, Swartbooi was removed from Parliament and resigned from SWAPO. In 2016 he formed the Landless People's Movement.

== Early life and education ==
Swartbooi attended secondary school at Suiderlig Senior Secondary School in Keetmanshoop. While at studying at the University of Namibia, he served as the secretary-general of Namibia National Students Organisation and later became its president.

Swartbooi worked as a prosecutor in Tsumeb and Khorixas and served as a special assistant at the office of the Prime Minister. Swartbooi holds a Basic Education Teaching Diploma from Windhoek College of Education (now University of Namibia Khomasdal Campus) and B juris as well as Bachelor of Laws from University of Namibia in 2001. Swartbooi obtained a PG Diploma in Land and Agrarian Reform from the University of Western Cape.

== Landless People's Movement ==
In 2017, after being fired by the late president Hage Geingob from his ministerial position, Swartbooi formed the Landless People's Movement (LPM), which is a new political party that aims to bring about change in the country through equitable land redistribution. LPM advocates for distribution of ancestral land to Namibians whose land was dispossessed by German settlers in the 1900s. He is the president of the party as well as its chief change campaigner.

In the 2019 Namibian general election, Swartbooi ran as presidential candidate of the LPM. They gathered 2.7% and four seats in Parliament.

In 2024, Swartbooi ran for President again doubling his votes to 51 560 votes.

In 2025, Swartbooi ran for speaker of the National Assembly, but lost after receiving 40 votes against SWAPO candidate and prime minister Saara Kuugongelwa, who won 55 votes.

== Personal life ==
Swartbooi's legislative interests includes Economic Policies and Agrarian Reform Politics. He is a teacher, lawyer, politician and farmer.

== Awards and recognition ==
In 2024, while the respective local authorities were under LPM government, streets were renamed after Swartbooi in Keetmanshoop, Mariental and Oranjemund.
