= Panduleni Itula =

Namibian politician (born 1957)

- Panduleni Itula

President of the Independent Patriots for Change
- Incumbent
- Assumed office 2 August 2020

Personal details
- Born: 2 August 1957 (age 69) Old Location, Windhoek, South West Africa
- Party: IPC (since 2020)
- Other political affiliations: SWAPO (1971–2020)

Panduleni Filemon Bango Itula (born 2 August 1957) is a Namibian politician, dentist, and lawyer who serves as the founder and president of the Independent Patriots for Change (IPC). Since the 2024 general election, the IPC has been the largest opposition party in the National Assembly.

A long time member of the ruling SWAPO, and former Chief Dentist at the Katutura State Hospital, Itula rose to national prominence in 2019 as the first independent presidential candidate in Namibian history. He finished second with 29% of the vote, the highest ever for a non-SWAPO candidate. He founded the IPC in 2020 following his expulsion from SWAPO the same year. In 2024, he again finished second with 26% of the vote, while the IPC obtained 20 seats, becoming the official opposition.

== Early life and education ==
During the apartheid years, Itula was a SWAPO Party Youth League (SPYL) leader in Windhoek, and after several unsuccessful attempts to capture him by the apartheid regime, Itula was arrested at the SWAPO office in April 1979. He was incarcerated and spent some of this period in solitary confinement. After imprisonment, he was released in January 1980. He left Namibia for London, and arrived on 1 April 1981. The trip to London was organised by anti-apartheid activist Anton Lubowski, and in London, Itula stayed with exiled Anglican Bishop Colin Winter. Itula then worked for the SPYL in London, continuing to lobby for Namibian independence.

He studied in Bristol at the University of Bristol Dental School, and was granted a dental degree by the Royal College of Surgeons of England in 1994. In 1998, he also obtained a Master's in Medical Science degree in oral surgery from the University of Sheffield. He also obtained additional qualifications in 2002, when he became a fellow in dental surgery of the Royal College of Physicians and Surgeons of Glasgow and of the Royal College of Surgeons of Edinburgh. In April 2005, he obtained a Post-Graduate Diploma in Dentistry (Sedation & Pain Control) at the University of the Western Cape. Itula also studied for a Masters in Law. He had a dental practice at Whitley Bay, a town near Newcastle in north-east England.

After 33 years in the United Kingdom, he came back to Namibia in December 2013. Itula was involved in a long-standing feud with the Medical and Dental Council of Namibia over registration as a dental specialist. He previously applied with the council in 2001 and again in 2002 to have his qualifications recognised, and was informed in 2008 that the council had decided not to consider his application because regulations under the Medical and Dental Act of 2008 were not yet in place. Itula eventually won the case and the Council was ordered by the Windhoek High Court to register him.

== 2019 Presidential candidacy ==
Despite being a SWAPO member since 1971, Itula declared his intentions to run for presidency in the 2019 Namibian general election as an independent candidate. He subsequently received threats of expulsion from SWAPO. The party cautioned Itula that they had already fielded Hage Geingob as its candidate for state president at its contested elective congress in 2017. Itula, however, downplayed the warning, citing that the ruling party at the moment did not have a legitimate candidate for the presidential and National Assembly elections, as it has violated the constitution in the events leading up to the congress in 2017, and also does not have a legitimate disciplinary structure to hold members accountable for violating the party's constitution, thus maintaining that he would not resign from the party despite the threats of expulsion. Itula had previously called for the resignation of former health minister Bernard Haufiku as well as SWAPO Secretary General Sophia Shaningwa in January 2019, claiming that she was "not fit for the job".

The Namibian Economic Freedom Fighters (NEFF), as well as the Republican Party (RP), both without a realistic chance in the previous election, withdrew their presidential candidates in early November and instead endorsed Itula. Itula finished second in the presidential election, gathering 29.4% of the votes. His candidacy was the main reason for the loss of votes for Hage Geingob compared to the previous election, in which he nevertheless won a second term in office. Because his independent candidacy was seen as "disruptive behaviour by not accepting the party's choice of Geingob as its sole candidate in the 2019 presidential election", Itula was expelled from SWAPO in March 2020.

== 2024 Presidential candidacy ==
He was a presidential candidate in the 2024 Namibian general election. He won second place with 25.5% of the vote, following president-elect Netumbo Nandi-Ndaitwah who received 57.3%.

== Personal life ==
Itula is an avid reader and writer. He is married to Shonag MacKenzie and resides in Windhoek.
