= Congress of Democrats =

Political party in Namibia

- President: Benjamin Ulenga
- Founded: March 1999
- Split from: SWAPO
- Headquarters: No. 8 Storch Street, Windhoek West, Windhoek, Namibia
- Women's wing: Women Democrats
- Ideology: Democratic socialism
- Political position: Left-wing
- Colors: Blue and Yellow
- Seats in the National Assembly: 0 / 72
- Local councillors: 2 / 327

Party flag

Website
- Website of CoD

CoD symbol

The Congress of Democrats (CoD) is a Namibian opposition party without representation in the National Assembly and was led by Ben Ulenga from 2004 to 2015. It was established in 1999, prior to that year's general elections, and started off with a number of notable politicians that left the ruling SWAPO party. This includes Ulenga who left SWAPO to protest plans to amend the constitution so that President Sam Nujoma could run for a third term. Vaino Amuthenu currently serves as the party's president.

== Election results ==
=== Presidential elections ===
Election	Candidate	Votes	%	Result
1999	Ben Ulenga	56,541	10.49%	Lost ✗
2004	Ben Ulenga	59,547	7.28%	Lost ✗
2009	Ben Ulenga	5,812	0.72%	Lost ✗
2014	Ben Ulenga	3,518	0.39%	Lost ✗
2019	Did not contest			
2024	Vaino Amuthenu	1,213	0.11%	Lost ✗

=== National Assembly elections ===
Election	Leader	Votes	%	Seats	+/–	Position	Government
1999	Ben Ulenga	53,289	9.94%	7 / 96	New	▲2nd	Opposition
2004	Ben Ulenga	59,464	7.27%	5 / 96	▼2	2nd	Opposition
2009	Ben Ulenga	5,375	0.66%	1 / 96	▼4	▼8th	Opposition
2014	Ben Ulenga	3,404	0.38%	0 / 96	▼1	▼11th	Extra-parliamentary
2019	Ben Ulenga	4,645	0.57%	0 / 96	0	▼12th	Extra-parliamentary
2024	Vaino Amuthenu	1,800	0.10%	0 / 96	0	▼19th	Extra-parliamentary

=== 1999 elections ===
Ulenga contested the 1999 presidential election. He came second behind Nujoma and received 10.5% of the vote. In the parliamentary elections the CoD gained seven seats. Besides Ulenga, Rosa Namises was one of the CoD parliamentarians in this legislative period.

=== 2004 elections ===
In the parliamentary election held on 15 and 16 November 2004, the party won 7.2% of popular votes and five out of 78 seats, making it the second-largest party behind SWAPO.

=== 2009 elections ===
In the 2009 general election, the Congress plummeted to eighth place in both presidential and assembly votes, receiving less than one percent of all votes; whereas the All People's Party ran sixth in both contests. Congress lost all but one of its five former seats in the Assembly, and joined the APP (which took one seat) in being tied for fifth through ninth place among parties in the Assembly.

== 2008 controversy ==
The CoD held an extraordinary party congress at Keetmanshoop in May 2008, and Ulenga was re-elected as CoD President; he defeated Ignatius Shixwameni by 14 votes, and Shixwameni, rejecting the outcome, left the congress in protest along with about half of the delegates. Shixwameni alleged rigging and claimed that his CoD faction represented the majority of the party; his faction went to the High Court to press these claims. On December 16, 2008, Shixwameni and 21 of his supporters announced their resignations from the CoD, but the faction led by Ulenga said that Shixwameni's resignation was invalid because he and five other party members had already been expelled on August 11, 2007. The Ulenga faction accused Shixwameni of "revolt[ing] against the party and its democratically elected leadership by organising illegitimate parallel national structures against CoD structures, and by attempting to usurp the national leadership of the party" following his defeat at the May 2008 congress. The Ulenga faction also said in December 2007 that it was suing Shixwameni and Nora Schimming-Chase to seek the return of about 260,000 Namibian dollars belonging to the party, which, according to the Ulenga faction, Shixwameni and Schiming-Chase had diverted and spent. In late 2007, Shimwameni's group formed a new party, the All People's Party.

On July 17, 2008, the High Court nullified the May 2007 congress and ruled that the CoD members expelled in August 2007 had to be allowed back into the party. The court also ordered that a new congress be held within five months. Ulenga accepted this decision. Schimming-Chase, who had previously been Vice-President of the CoD, returned to her post as a result of the High Court's decision, but she was not allowed to resume her other previously held post of Chief Whip. In early August, the CoD's National Executive Committee set the date of the new congress as October 24–26.
