= Body of Christ Party =

Political party in Namibia

- Leader: Festus Thomas
- Founded: 2023
- Ideology: Christian democracy

The Body of Christ Party (BCP) is a Christian democratic party founded in 2023 in Namibia. It contested the 2024 presidential and national assembly elections, receiving a single seat in the National Assembly.

== History ==
The BCP was founded in 2018 by Bishop Festus Thomas based on Christian principles, but was not registered with the Electoral Commission of Namibia until 2023. The party claimed that, if elected, they would promote 'biblical values' and reintroduce the teaching of the Bible in public schools, as well as installing "A total of 50% representation of church in all spheres representing economic benefit, political participation, managerial and leadership responsibility." In addition to faith-based issues, it campaigned on ending corruption and managing land distribution and unemployment.

== Electoral history ==
The party contested the 2024 presidential election with their leader, Festus Thomas, as well as the National Assembly election. Thomas received 3,641 votes, or 0.33% of the vote. In the National Assembly election, the party received 5,763 votes and one seat in the National Assembly.

=== Presidential elections ===
Election	Party candidate	Votes	%	Result
2024	Festus Thomas	3,641	0.33%	Lost ✗

=== National Assembly elections ===
Election	Party Leader	Votes	%	Seats	+/-	Position	Result
2024	Festus Thomas	5,763	0.53%	1 / 96	New	▲13th	Opposition
