= National Democratic Party (Namibia) =

Political party in Namibia

The National Democratic Party (NDP) is a political party in Namibia. It was formed in 1973 as the Ovamboland Independence Party (OIP) by Silas Ipumbu. It took the name NDP to contest the elections to the Ovambo Legislative Assembly, by then under the leadership of Cornelius Tuhafeni Ndjoba. The party's base was amongst the Ovambo people. The party is currently led by Martin Lukato. NDP won one seat in the National Assembly, sending Lukato to parliament, in the National Assembly election of 2024.

After being dormant for three decades, the NDP contested the 2015 local authority elections in the Zambezi Region but failed to gain a seat. In 2019 it contested the National Assembly election and received 4,559 votes (0.6%), not enough to gain a seat in parliament. It also competed in the 2024 Namibian general election and received 6,647 votes (0.61%), which gained the party one seat.
