= All People's Party (Namibia) =

Political party in Namibia

- Abbreviation: APP
- President: Ambrosius Kumbwa
- Secretary-General: Venitus Marius Goraseb
- Founded: January 2008
- Split from: Congress of Democrats
- Headquarters: Windhoek; Khomas Region
- Ideology: Social democracy
- Political position: Centre-left
- Colors: Vermilion; Black
- Seats in the National Assembly: 2 / 104
- Seats in the National Council: 0 / 42
- Regional Councillors: 0 / 121
- Local Councillors: 4 / 378
- Pan-African Parliament: 0 / 5

Party flag

Website
- www.app.org.na

The All People's Party (APP) is a political party in Namibia.

Registered with the Electoral Commission of Namibia in January 2008, the party was initially made up primarily of former members of the Congress of Democrats and SWAPO political parties. Among the initial leaders were Chairperson Ignatius Shixwameni and Deputy Chairperson Stephanus Swartbooi.

Ignatius Shixwameni, who had led the party since 2009, died on 10 November 2021.

A new party leadership was elected in August 2024. Ambrosius Kumbwa became president, Linus Muchila his vice president and Faustinus Wakudumo was elected as the national chairperson.

== Policies ==
Prior to the 2009 general election, the party sought to eliminate poverty in Namibia within five years and informal settlements in ten years. In a political forum prior to the 2009 election, party representative Lena Nakatana stated that the human rights of LGBT Namibians should be respected because of their equal citizenship.

== Electoral history ==
=== Presidential elections ===
Election	Party candidate	Votes	%	Result
2009	Ignatius Shixwameni	9,981	1.23%	Lost ✗
2014	Ignatius Shixwameni	7,266	0.82%	Lost ✗
2019	Ignatius Shixwameni	3,304	0.40%	Lost ✗
2024	Ambrosius Kumbwa	5,197	0.47%	Lost ✗

=== National Assembly elections ===
Election	Party leader	Votes	%	Seats	+/–	Position	Result
2009	Ignatius Shixwameni	10,795	1.33%	1 / 72	New	▲6th	Opposition
2014	Ignatius Shixwameni	20,431	2.29%	2 / 96	▲1	▲4th	Opposition
2019	Ignatius Shixwameni	14,664	1.79%	2 / 96	0	▼5th	Opposition
2024	Ambrosius Kumbwa	7,219	0.66%	1 / 96	▼1	▼11th	Opposition

=== 2015 local and regional elections ===
In the 2015 Namibian local and regional elections, the APP won 4 council seats.

=== 2014 general election ===
In the 2014 Namibian general election, the APP gained 2 seats in parliament.

=== 2009 general election ===
In the 2009 Namibian general election campaign, the party leadership consisted of President Shixwameni, Vice President Reinhold Madala Nauyoma, Secretary General Mukuve Marcellus Mudumbi and National chairman Herbert Shixwameni. All four were activists in the Namibia National Students Organisation.

In October 2009, the party and the Rehoboth Ratepayers' Association, a local political party in Rehoboth in the Hardap Region, agreed to a collective agreement to cooperate in the 2009 general elections. The leader of the association, Lukas de Klerk, said it was a way for Rehoboth to have representation in the Namibian National Assembly. De Klerk was listed at the sixth position for the party on the list for National Assembly.

Party President Ignatius Shixwameni was elected to the National Assembly with the party. The party garnered 10,795 (1.3 percent) of votes for the National Assembly. It party joined other opposition parties in contesting the conduct and outcome of the 2009 National Assembly election, bringing forth a legal challenge aiming to declare the election null and void.

=== 2004 local and regional elections ===
Although the party was founded after the 2004 Namibian local and regional elections, it participated in the regional by-election in the Tobias Hainyeko constituency in October 2008. However, it received only 164 votes, compared to 5,526 for SWAPO. The other political parties contesting the election withdrew two days prior to the election.

== See also ==
- List of political parties in Namibia
- Manifesto of the APP
