= 2024 Namibian general election =

- 27–30 November 2024
- Registered: 1,449,569
- Presidential election
- Turnout: 76.86% (▲16.04pp)
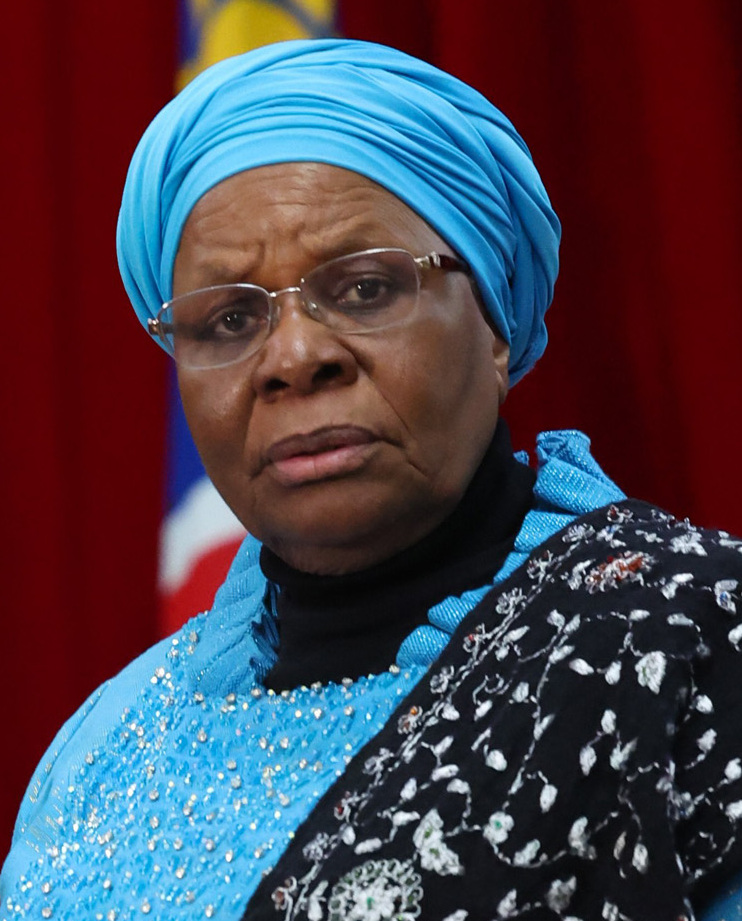

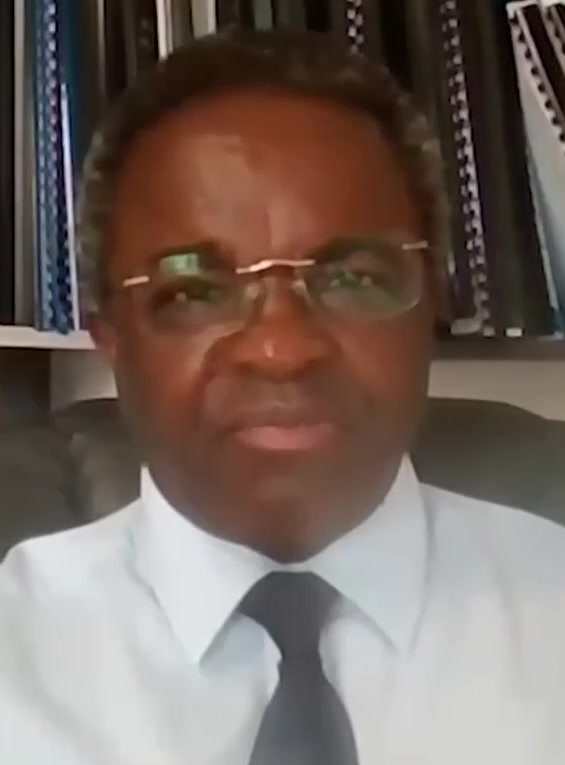

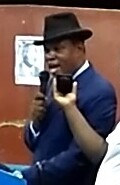
Nominee	Netumbo Nandi-Ndaitwah	Panduleni Itula	McHenry Venaani
Party	SWAPO	IPC	PDM
Popular vote	638,560	284,106	55,412
Percentage	58.07%	25.84%	5.04%
- Results by constituency
President before election
Nangolo Mbumba
SWAPO
Elected President
Netumbo Nandi-Ndaitwah
SWAPO
- Parliamentary election
- 96 of the 104 seats in the National Assembly; 49 seats needed for a majority
- Turnout: 76.48% (▲15.66pp)
Party	Leader	Vote %	Seats	+/–
SWAPO	Netumbo Nandi-Ndaitwah	53.37	51	−12
IPC	Panduleni Itula	20.20	20	New
AR	Job Amupanda	6.61	6	New
PDM	McHenry Venaani	5.48	5	−11
LPM	Bernadus Swartbooi	5.21	5	+1
UDF	Hendrik Gaobaeb	1.54	2	0
NEFF	Epafras Mukwiilongo	1.07	1	−1
SWANU	Evilastus Kaaronda	1.05	1	0
RP	Henk Mudge	1.00	1	−1
NUDO	Esther Muinjangue	0.98	1	−1
APP	Ambrosius Kumbwa	0.66	1	−1
NDP	Martin Lukato	0.61	1	+1
BCP	Festus Thomas	0.53	1	New
This lists parties that won seats. See the complete results below.

General elections were held in Namibia to elect a new president and members of the National Assembly. Initially scheduled on 27 November 2024, these were later extended in some areas to 30 November due to poor planning. Opposition parties decried the move, boycotting the declaration of results and pledging to challenge the results of the election in court. They were the country's seventh general elections since gaining independence from apartheid South Africa in 1990.

On 3 December 2024, Netumbo Nandi-Ndaitwah of the ruling SWAPO party was declared the winner of the election. She became Namibia's first female president. The National Assembly elections saw SWAPO reduced to 51 seats, a bare majority of three. It was SWAPO's weakest showing since Namibia's independence in 1990.

== Background ==
Hage Geingob had died in office on 4 February 2024 whilst receiving treatment for cancer and was replaced by his vice-president, Nangolo Mbumba. Mbumba announced that he had no intention of running for president, and that he would serve out the remainder of Geingob's term which was to expire on 21 March 2025.

In 2019, the ruling SWAPO party received 56% of the vote, down from 87% in 2014. SWAPO, which gained its base fighting against apartheid in 1990, is seemingly losing support among youth voters, who are dissatisfied with low employment rates. The current unemployment rate is around 20%.

Prior to the election, online disinformation campaigns targeted various candidates. These campaigns included false allegations of opposition candidate Panduleni Itula being a "British agent"; purported footage of another opposition candidate, Bernadus Swartbooi, making tribalist statements towards Itula; and an artificially-generated image of SWAPO candidate Netumbo Nandi-Ndaitwah fainting at rallies. Various politicians accused the Zimbabwean ZANU–PF of spreading false information.

== Electoral system ==
The President of Namibia is elected using the two-round system; if no candidate receives more than 50% in the first round of voting, a run-off will be held. No previous presidential votes in Namibia have gone to a second round.

The 104 members of the National Assembly consist of 96 elected members and eight (non-voting) members appointed by the president. The 96 elected members are elected by closed list proportional representation from one nationwide constituency. Seats are allocated using the largest remainder method.

== Presidential candidates ==
As president Geingob was ineligible for re-election after having served two consecutive terms, he selected deputy prime minister Netumbo Nandi-Ndaitwah to run for president as a candidate of his party, the South West Africa People's Organisation (SWAPO), of which she was also vice-president, in 2023. Upon Geingob's death, she was appointed vice president by president Mbumba. She became the first female vice-president of Namibia.

Fourteen others were also running for president in the election. These included 2019 presidential candidate Panduleni Itula of the Independent Patriots for Change (IPC), the main opposition candidate, Popular Democratic Movement (PDM) leader McHenry Venaani, former deputy minister Bernadus Swartbooi of the Landless People's Movement (LPM), and former Windhoek mayor Job Amupanda of Affirmative Repositioning (AR).

== Conduct ==
Voting was marred by logistical and technical problems such as malfunctioning voter identification tablets and insufficient ballot papers, causing long queues and the extension of voting hours by the Electoral Commission of Namibia (ECN) until 28 November. The IPC accused the ECN of "deliberately suppressing voters and deliberately trying to frustrate voters from casting their vote". Following complaints from opposition parties, the ECN announced a further extension of voting hours for 29 and 30 November at 36 selected polling locations in Windhoek as well as in the Kunene, Oshana and Oshikoto regions. Representatives of the IPC, PDM and AR expressed dissatisfaction with the limited selection of polling locations for the voting extension. Legal experts and the IPC have called into question the legality of the voting extension. African Union (AU) election observers criticised the ECN's decision to extend voting for causing confusion. The IPC accused the ECN of "deliberately trying to dissuade voters from voting". The AU observer mission gave the ECN a transparency score of just 50%.

On 29 November, the ECN extended voting until the night of 30 November. The IPC alleged that this extension was illegal and accused SWAPO of committing fraud. Election monitors, consisting of southern African human rights lawyers, claimed that delays were intentional. Panduleni Itula declared that "the IPC shall not recognize the outcome of that election." The opposition refused to recognise the results and announced plans to file legal challenges.

A preliminary investigation by the AU carried out on 29 November did not find evidence of election misconduct.

On 3 December, the ECN declared Netumbo Nandi-Ndaitwah the winner of the election.

== Results ==
=== President ===
Candidate	Party	Votes	%
Netumbo Nandi-Ndaitwah	SWAPO	638,560	58.07
Panduleni Itula	Independent Patriots for Change	284,106	25.84
McHenry Venaani	Popular Democratic Movement	55,412	5.04
Bernadus Swartbooi	Landless People's Movement	51,160	4.65
Job Amupanda	Affirmative Repositioning	19,676	1.79
Hendrik Gaobaeb	United Democratic Front	12,604	1.15
Henk Mudge	Republican Party	8,988	0.82
Evilastus Kaaronda	SWANU	7,991	0.73
Ambrosius Kumbwa	All People's Party	5,197	0.47
Epafras Mukwiilongo	Namibian Economic Freedom Fighters	3,978	0.36
Festus Thomas	Body of Christ Party	3,641	0.33
Mike Kavekotora	Rally for Democracy and Progress	2,974	0.27
Erastus Shuumbwa	Action Democratic Movement Party	2,069	0.19
Sakaria Likuwa	United Namibians Party	2,013	0.18
Vaino Amuthenu	Congress of Democrats	1,213	0.11
Total		1,099,582	100.00
Valid votes		1,099,582	98.69
Invalid/blank votes		14,552	1.31
Total votes		1,114,134	100.00
Registered voters/turnout		1,449,569	76.86

=== National Assembly ===
Party	Votes	%	+/–	Seats	+/–
SWAPO	583,300	53.38	−12.07	51	−12
Independent Patriots for Change	220,809	20.21	New	20	New
Affirmative Repositioning	72,227	6.61	New	6	New
Popular Democratic Movement	59,839	5.48	−11.17	5	−11
Landless People's Movement	56,971	5.21	+0.46	5	+1
United Democratic Front	16,828	1.54	−0.25	2	0
Namibian Economic Freedom Fighters	11,743	1.07	−0.59	1	−1
SWANU	11,484	1.05	+0.40	1	0
Republican Party	10,942	1.00	−0.77	1	−1
National Unity Democratic Organisation	10,687	0.98	−0.98	1	−1
All People's Party	7,219	0.66	−1.13	1	−1
National Democratic Party	6,647	0.61	+0.05	1	+1
Body of Christ Party	5,763	0.53	New	1	New
Rally for Democracy and Progress	3,308	0.30	−0.79	0	−1
National Empowerment Fighting Corruption	3,216	0.29	New	0	New
United Namibians Party	2,706	0.25	New	0	New
Action Democratic Movement Party	2,286	0.21	New	0	New
United People's Movement	2,143	0.20	New	0	New
Congress of Democrats	1,800	0.16	−0.40	0	0
Christian Democratic Voice	1,452	0.13	−0.58	0	−1
National Patriotic Front	1,315	0.12	−0.10	0	0
Appointed members				8	0
Total	1,092,685	100.00	–	104	0
Valid votes	1,092,685	98.57			
Invalid/blank votes	15,898	1.43			
Total votes	1,108,583	100.00			
Registered voters/turnout	1,449,569	76.48	+16.10		

==== By constituency ====
Constituency	SWAPO	IPC	AR	PDM	LPM	UDF	SWANU	RP	NDP	Other	Total
Aminuis	1892	255	38	325	270	12	2048	93	16	682	5631
Anamulenge	6909	855	277	38	8	7	14	2	1	92	8203
Arandis	2515	2653	802	448	610	561	28	286	34	425	8362
Aranos	1546	559	52	202	1178	11	25	447	0	151	4171
Berseba	1860	246	54	424	2048	13	13	51	10	141	4860
Dâures	1593	918	154	759	368	1199	234	32	9	414	5680
Daweb	1047	372	79	48	1179	12	6	55	3	78	2879
Eengodi	6112	1171	235	39	3	19	15	3	6	201	7804
Eenhana	10186	2199	1073	103	29	16	30	11	23	590	14260
Elim	4796	888	354	43	3	9	11	0	1	427	6532
Endola	8523	2399	980	131	7	9	33	8	3	439	12532
Engela	7518	1959	684	201	13	15	27	6	10	324	10757
Epembe	4593	549	157	26	5	8	14	2	4	154	5512
Epukiro	1108	172	21	528	171	4	331	38	6	331	2710
Epupa	4130	219	130	5411	9	16	27	2	8	283	10235
Etayi	10792	1937	590	114	9	18	26	0	6	258	13750
Gibeon	1185	105	22	51	1561	9	11	16	5	91	3056
Gobabis	4212	1442	356	708	1438	50	405	613	47	598	9869
Grootfontein	5883	1968	778	950	1072	222	16	140	95	874	11998
Guinas	2047	490	130	109	519	38	12	36	9	96	3486
John Pandeni	4559	3409	1986	968	1383	174	317	51	38	685	13570
Judea Lyaboloma	1495	497	119	132	27	23	5	24	159	88	2569
Kabbe North	2021	603	81	163	25	5	4	3	147	109	3161
Kabbe South	2239	274	47	78	12	7	5	0	136	53	2851
Kalahari	2473	672	182	474	682	42	205	284	31	279	5324
Kamanjab	1454	365	75	424	183	817	21	76	7	140	3562
Kapako	5882	903	303	454	74	38	25	14	36	678	8407
Karasburg East	1997	795	131	316	1949	7	18	121	20	224	5578
Karasburg West	4044	1595	164	226	500	13	12	65	21	320	6960
Karibib	3080	1741	445	615	671	1155	57	93	22	471	8350
Katima Mulilo Rural	3463	857	150	310	20	10	15	33	480	153	5491
Katima Mulilo Urban	6593	2157	653	638	96	24	24	17	1371	398	11971
Katutura Central	1789	1640	540	2147	1171	198	682	37	25	888	9117
Katutura East	5284	3803	1946	661	2353	533	100	53	83	613	15429
Keetmanshoop Rural	1,936	482	189	429	2,101	6	13	103	21	114	5394
Keetmanshoop Urban	3422	1026	397	404	3471	22	24	168	29	205	9168
Khomasdal	4489	3848	2082	1500	1948	225	470	187	176	890	15815
Khorixas	2087	452	117	400	389	2607	12	5	14	117	6200
Kongola	1912	751	232	144	150	37	14	28	387	177	3832
Linyanti	1550	508	42	196	25	5	8	147	584	80	3145
Mankumpi	1738	161	34	60	16	8	5	4	4	110	2140
Mariental Rural	1731	352	53	167	1110	8	9	203	9	129	3771
Mariental Urban	3391	788	227	255	2782	33	32	176	19	226	7929
Mashare	3518	381	75	314	52	17	20	45	14	1123	5559
Moses ǁGaroëb	11078	7150	1592	391	585	94	94	30	29	1015	22058
Mpungu	5384	478	109	86	14	18	14	3	3	154	6263
Mukwe	4766	1420	324	1599	68	31	32	23	51	1642	9956
Musese	3068	289	44	233	17	9	17	5	5	308	3995
Ncamagoro	1477	180	31	134	14	9	12	3	1	135	1996
Ncuncuni	1565	289	88	150	46	7	10	3	5	246	2409
Ndiyona	2236	382	66	259	30	15	13	160	10	501	3672
Ndonga Linena	2586	594	61	360	22	13	11	11	7	458	4123
Nehale lyaMpingana	4430	598	185	43	31	17	19	1	7	142	5473
Nkurenkuru	4457	726	341	137	20	7	19	16	20	190	5933
Ogongo	5453	627	254	32	5	9	13	3	3	130	6529
Ohangwena	7792	2176	702	212	23	23	31	5	6	486	11456
Okahandja	6594	3567	1347	1184	1483	536	195	556	105	835	16402
Okahao	8270	1239	548	55	10	12	24	1	11	149	10319
Okakarara	1867	794	114	2728	105	16	860	19	144	2555	9202
Okaku	6050	2458	761	126	22	20	28	2	15	523	10005
Okalongo	10822	1698	432	79	23	15	20	3	3	241	13336
Okankolo	4808	898	253	29	5	14	15	2	4	208	6236
Okatana	6093	1955	787	100	19	10	5	5	6	434	9414
Okatyali	1398	654	141	16	4	3	5	0	2	68	2291
Okongo	9913	1227	424	83	9	19	29	21	6	263	11994
Okorukambe	1997	402	81	429	530	44	92	157	16	184	3932
Olukonda	3499	1981	584	64	15	16	12	1	2	213	6387
Omaruru	1937	1034	252	715	264	377	67	64	12	266	4988
Omatako	2887	1263	501	813	264	72	182	113	45	754	6894
Ompundja	1916	508	102	17	3	10	3	1	3	77	2640
Omulonga	8402	1539	367	66	6	17	26	6	2	317	10748
Omundaungilo	4964	510	150	34	3	7	11	8	1	219	5907
Omuntele	6006	2042	292	30	9	22	23	4	11	213	8652
Omuthiyagwiipundi	8002	3652	957	108	29	27	26	5	12	517	13335
Onayena	4634	1529	532	33	11	9	18	4	2	115	6887
Ondangwa Rural	3330	1965	1122	121	33	11	18	4	5	382	6991
Ondangwa Urban	7919	6681	2682	396	251	30	21	8	42	997	19027
Ondobe	9220	1424	397	62	9	19	29	7	1	330	11498
Onesi	7148	863	244	78	29	17	28	2	6	143	8558
Ongenga	7382	1675	492	90	6	9	20	6	6	256	9942
Ongwediva	9214	4616	2470	273	48	13	36	11	19	568	17268
Oniipa	5025	2488	686	88	32	12	25	1	1	297	8655
Onyaanya	6689	2178	424	41	17	19	21	1	6	261	9657
Opuwo Rural	1005	202	100	3714	30	29	245	9	11	534	5879
Opuwo Urban	3771	790	399	3307	46	49	69	14	15	559	9019
Oranjemund	2852	2141	777	204	840	15	19	50	30	295	7223
Oshakati East	9201	5605	1634	478	50	17	23	10	11	717	17746
Oshakati West	8028	4015	1384	309	39	2	21	2	9	7	14576
Oshikango	9553	2252	490	206	27	20	32	7	8	487	13082
Oshikuku	6370	1223	657	88	8	11	15	0	4	282	8658
Oshikunde	6171	556	194	37	6	12	16	7	4	183	7186
Otamanzi	5586	641	177	30	6	17	12	3	3	78	6553
Otavi	3620	1462	539	350	641	155	42	141	44	489	7483
Otjinene	937	221	35	964	116	13	478	20	6	1278 (1183 NUDO)	4068
Otjiwarongo	6506	3774	1185	1764	2061	1055	202	233	72	1188	18040
Otjombinde	962	235	23	462	256	16	355	15	6	221	2551
Outapi	17659	2790	1296	132	23	22	37	5	12	349	22325
Outjo	2686	966	176	811	651	1123	35	146	0	387	6981
Rehoboth Rural	1670	457	48	193	663	14	12	45	9	183	3294
Rehoboth Urban East	3066	1171	155	375	1548	82	21	158	16	593	7185
Rehoboth Urban West	1370	1533	136	577	1159	23	9	220	12	616	5655
Ruacana	6279	1062	429	606	29	19	82	1	9	244	8760
Rundu Rural	2,770	487	129	263	41	16	20	14	15	642	4397
Rundu Urban	15153	3951	1583	1447	503	95	79	199	178	2408	25596
Samora Machel	8806	6487	2042	863	1462	213	226	38	39	1081	21257
Sesfontein	1319	459	154	624	60	1120	16	5	7	201	3965
Sibbinda	2113	1028	102	347	19	6	6	71	530	237	4459
Swakopmund	7440	10187	1926	1102	1601	1251	123	803	42	1181	25656
Tobias Hainyeko	7995	4285	1237	333	488	126	53	33	57	838	15445
Tondoro	4053	322	92	282	22	21	9	9	9	158	4977
Tsandi	12477	1514	485	66	8	22	25	2	4	215	14818
Tsumeb	5428	2984	978	602	967	225	39	126	47	604	12000
Tsumkwe	2180	310	62	284	197	25	550	158	20	154	3940
Uukwiyu	3522	1519	467	41	15	4	18	4	5	255	5850
Uuvudhiya	2103	348	110	25	38	70	4	2	3	80	2783
Walvis Bay Rural	5424	6704	1527	630	698	252	68	72	45	698	16118
Walvis Bay Urban	6506	8451	1860	514	589	218	62	270	43	699	19212
Windhoek East	7242	8293	3489	1138	930	144	228	1300	127	826	23717
Windhoek Rural	5822	4776	2164	881	2054	141	155	591	66	785	17435
Windhoek West	10597	9244	5013	1821	2226	258	396	1057	319	1185	32116
ǃNamiǂNûs	3328	2622	526	229	989	11	16	29	19	339	8108
Total	583300	220809	72227	59839	56971	16828	11484	10942	6647	53638	1092685
Percent	53.38	20.21	6.61	5.48	5.21	1.54	1.05	1.00	0.61	4.91	100.0
Constituencies	104	6	0	4	5	1	1	0	0	1	121
Source: ECN

== Aftermath ==
On 3 December 2024, Nandi-Ndaitwah was declared the victor with 57% of the vote, avoiding a runoff election which was predicted to occur. She became the first woman to be elected as president of Namibia and will be one of two women presidents in Africa, alongside Samia Suluhu Hassan of Tanzania. In a speech to supporters, Nandi-Ndaitwah stated "the Namibian nation has voted for peace and stability." The results showed the weakest showing for SWAPO since Namibia's independence, with the party barely receiving a majority in parliament. Bloomberg identified the result as "broad policy continuity in a nation that's on the verge of becoming a major hydrocarbons producer", noting the recent discovery of offshore deposits in the Orange Basin.

Panduleni Itula, the second-place candidate, declared that there was a "multitude of irregularities" and would "fight... to nullify the elections through the processes that are established within our electoral process." Opposition parties pledged to challenge the election extension in court. Itula criticized the opening of only selective polling stations, which may have prevented thousands of voters from casting their vote. The opposition parties boycotted the announcement of the official results that took place in Windhoek. Calls for a repeat of the election by the opposition was rejected by the ECN. The Forum of German-Speaking Namibians noted that doubts caused by the extension can lead to governmental distrust, and "it is in the hands of the ECN to avoid this slippery path to chaos and violence."

On 13 December, the Namibian electoral court ordered the ECN to allow the IPC and the LPM to obtain access to electoral data as part of their electoral protest. On 28 February 2025, the Supreme Court of Namibia ruled that the voting extension was valid and rejected the IPC's protest.
