= Affirmative Repositioning =

Namibian political organisation

- Abbreviation: AR
- Founded: 10 November 2014
- Split from: SWAPO
- Headquarters: Windhoek
- Ideology: Marxism; Fanonism; Sankarism; Anti-imperialism; Pan-Africanism; Land reform
- Political position: Left-wing to far-left
- International affiliation: World Federation of Democratic Youth
- Seats in the National Assembly: 6 / 104
- Seats in the National Council: 0 / 42
- Regional Councillors: 0 / 121
- Local Councillors: 0 / 378
- Pan-African Parliament: 0 / 5

Affirmative Repositioning (AR) is a leftist political movement in Namibia mainly focused on land reform, youth empowerment and social reform. Founded in 2014 by Job Amupanda, Dimbulukeni Nauyoma and George Kambala, the AR uses social media platforms to mobilise residents to apply for erven (small residential land titles) from municipalities. Due to thousands of youth submitting their forms on the same day, these activities have the character of mass demonstrations. The movement had, in a first round in November 2014, achieved a wave of individual land applications in Windhoek, Namibia's capital, which had since spread to other Namibian towns. The Affirmative Repositioning movement had threatened to take the land by force if the applications were not processed and approved by July 2015 in the local municipalities. In 2024 the movement was officially registered as a political party.

Affirmative Reposition (AR) took part in the National Assembly of Namibia elections for 2024 and obtained 6 seats.

== Establishment and operations ==
=== As a social movement ===
On 9 November 2014, Amupanda, Kambala and Nauyoma cleared land which they named "Erf 2014" in Windhoek's affluent Kleine Kuppe suburb, calling the high rental prices in town and nepotism in the municipality as reasons for their actions. The action was widely seen as illegal land grabbing. Amupanda, who was SWAPO Party Youth League (SPYL)'s Secretary for Information, Publicity and Mobilisation at that time and also served in the youth wing's executive committee, resigned his positions shortly before all three activists were expelled from SWAPO for their actions. This expulsion was ordered by the 'Top four' of SWAPO party: president Hifikepunye Pohamba, vice-president Hage Geingob, secretary-general Nangolo Mbumba, and his deputy Laura McLeod-Katjirua. The trio vacated the illegally occupied plot after a few days.

Meanwhile, AR activists started using social media and existing SWAPO Youth League party structures to mobilise young people to apply for land at the Windhoek municipality. On 21 November 2014 the City of Windhoek received 14,000 individual land applications. In a second round of mass action on 27 February 2015, Windhoek received a further 2,500 applications. Land applications were also handed in to the municipalities of Walvis Bay (9,500 applications), Okahandja (4,000), Swakopmund (3,000), Ongwediva (2,500), Oshakati (2,500), Keetmanshoop (800), Rundu (400), Otjiwarongo (200) and Tsumeb (200).

In April 2015 the municipality of Henties Bay offered 120 serviced land plots to applicants of the AR movement, among them Amupanda, Nauyoma, and Kambala. This move has been widely criticised, and the AR leaders were accused of misusing their movement's goals by applying for plots in the upmarket holiday town of Henties Bay while being residents of Windhoek. As of May 2015, the plots have not been transferred.

In May 2016 all three AR leaders were reinstated as SWAPO members after they won their respective court case against the party.

=== As political party ===
After political commentators had for some time speculated that the Affirmative Repositioning movement would transform into a political party, the movement was registered for the 2020 local elections as an association in the urban centres of Windhoek, Walvis Bay and Swakopmund.

== Reception ==
In 2015, AR was described as the "biggest peaceful mass action since Namibia’s independence in 1990." The level of organisation within the movement as well as the variety of political promises by its main activist, Amupanda, raised the concern that AR might be a "political party in the making". SWAPO has generally condemned the initial land grab, but regarding the subsequent mobilisation action the party has not taken a uniform position. Former SPYL secretary-general Elijah Ngurare has backed the movement but several regional SWAPO politicians do not approve of it.

== Electoral history ==
=== Presidential elections ===
Election	Party candidate	Votes	%	Result
2024	Job Amupanda	19,676	1.79%	Lost ✗

=== National Assembly elections ===
Election	Party Leader	Votes	%	Seats	+/-	Position	Result
2024	Job Amupanda	72,227	6.61%	6 / 96	New	3rd	Opposition
