= Independent Patriots for Change =

Political party in Namibia

- Abbreviation: IPC
- President: Panduleni Itula
- Chairperson: Brian Kefas Black
- Secretary-General: Christine Esperanza !Aochamus
- Founder: Panduleni Itula
- Founded: 2 August 2020; 5 years ago
- Split from: SWAPO
- Headquarters: Windhoek
- Ideology: Grassroots democracy Anti-corruption
- Seats in the National Assembly: 20 / 104
- Seats in the National Council: 2 / 42
- Regional Councillors: 5 / 121
- Local Councillors: 66 / 378
- Pan-African Parliament: 0 / 5

Party flag

Website
- www.ipc-namibia.com//

The Independent Patriots for Change (IPC) is a political party in Namibia. It was founded by Panduleni Itula in August 2020. As an independent presidential candidate in the 2019 election, Itula won the best result of a losing candidate in a Namibian presidential election. At the founding meeting on 2 August 2020 in Windhoek, Itula was elected party president, Brian Kefas Black chairman and Christine Esperanza ǃAochamus general secretary. Trevino Forbes, the current Mayor of Walvis Bay, serves as the current Vice President of the party.

The party participated in the 2020 local and regional council elections. It won the municipal elections in the commercial hubs Walvis Bay and Swakopmund, and 29 seats in different constituencies in Northern Namibia, hitherto considered an impenetrable SWAPO stronghold. On 28 November 2024, Trevino Forbes of IPC was re-elected as the mayor of Walvis Bay at a special council meeting.

In November 2024, the party contested the 2024 Namibian general election, with its Founder and President, Panduleni Itula, as their presidential candidate. The party received 220,809 votes (20.2%) of the national vote and gained 20 seats in the Parliament of Namibia. It became the second strongest parliamentary party, behind SWAPO. Furthermore, Panduleni Itula, as their presidential candidate, received 284,106 votes (25.84%) nationally, placing him in second position behind Netumbo Nandi-Ndaitwah.

== Electoral history ==
=== Presidential elections ===
Election	Party candidate	Votes	%	Result
2024	Panduleni Itula	284,106	25.84%	Lost ✗

=== National Assembly elections ===
Election	Party Leader	Votes	%	Seats	+/-	Position	Result
2024	Panduleni Itula	220,809	20.21%	20 / 96	New	▲2nd	Opposition
