= Parliament of Namibia =

National legislature of Namibia

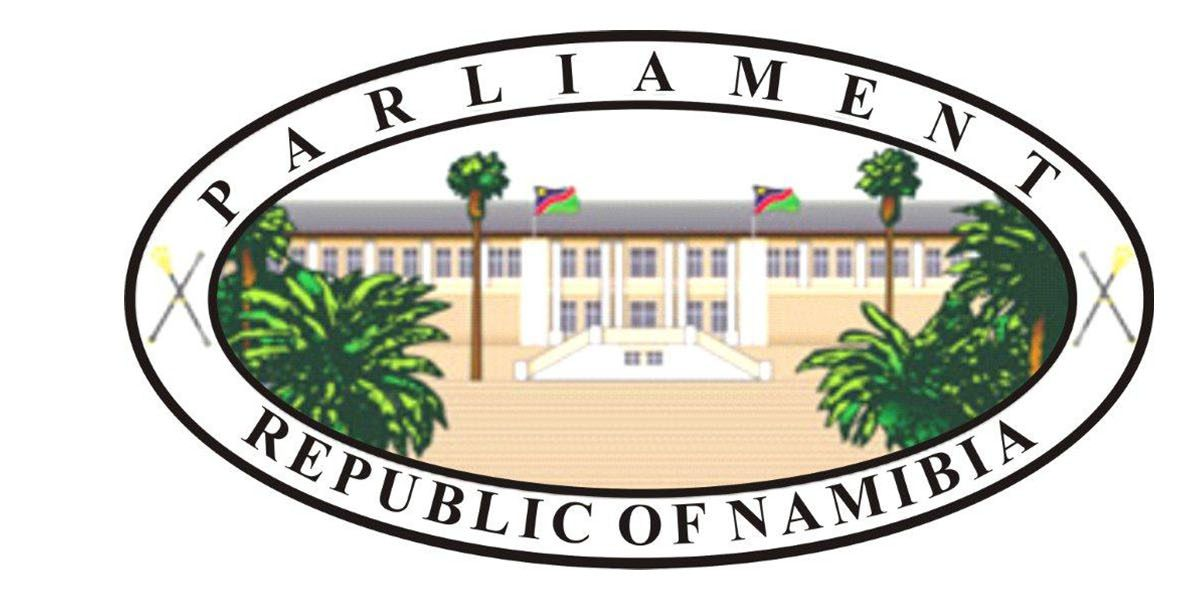

Type
- Type: Bicameral
- Houses: National Council; National Assembly

Leadership
- Chairperson of the National Council: Lukas Sinimbo Muha, SWAPO since 15 December 2020
- Speaker of the National Assembly: Saara Kuugongelwa, SWAPO since 21 March 2025

Structure
- Seats: 146; National Council (42); National Assembly (104)
- National Council political groups: Government (39) SWAPO (39) Official opposition (2) PDM (2) Other parties (1) UDF (1)
- National Assembly political groups: Government (59) SWAPO (51) Appointed members (8) Official opposition (20) IPC (20) Other parties (25) AR (7) PDM (5) LPM (5) UDF (1) NEFF (1) SWANU (1) RP (1) NUDO (1) APP (1) NDP (1) BCP (1)

Elections
- National Council voting system: Indirect election by regional councils
- National Assembly voting system: Closed list proportional representation and appointments by the President
- Last National Council election: 26 November 2025
- Last National Assembly election: 27–30 November 2024

Meeting place
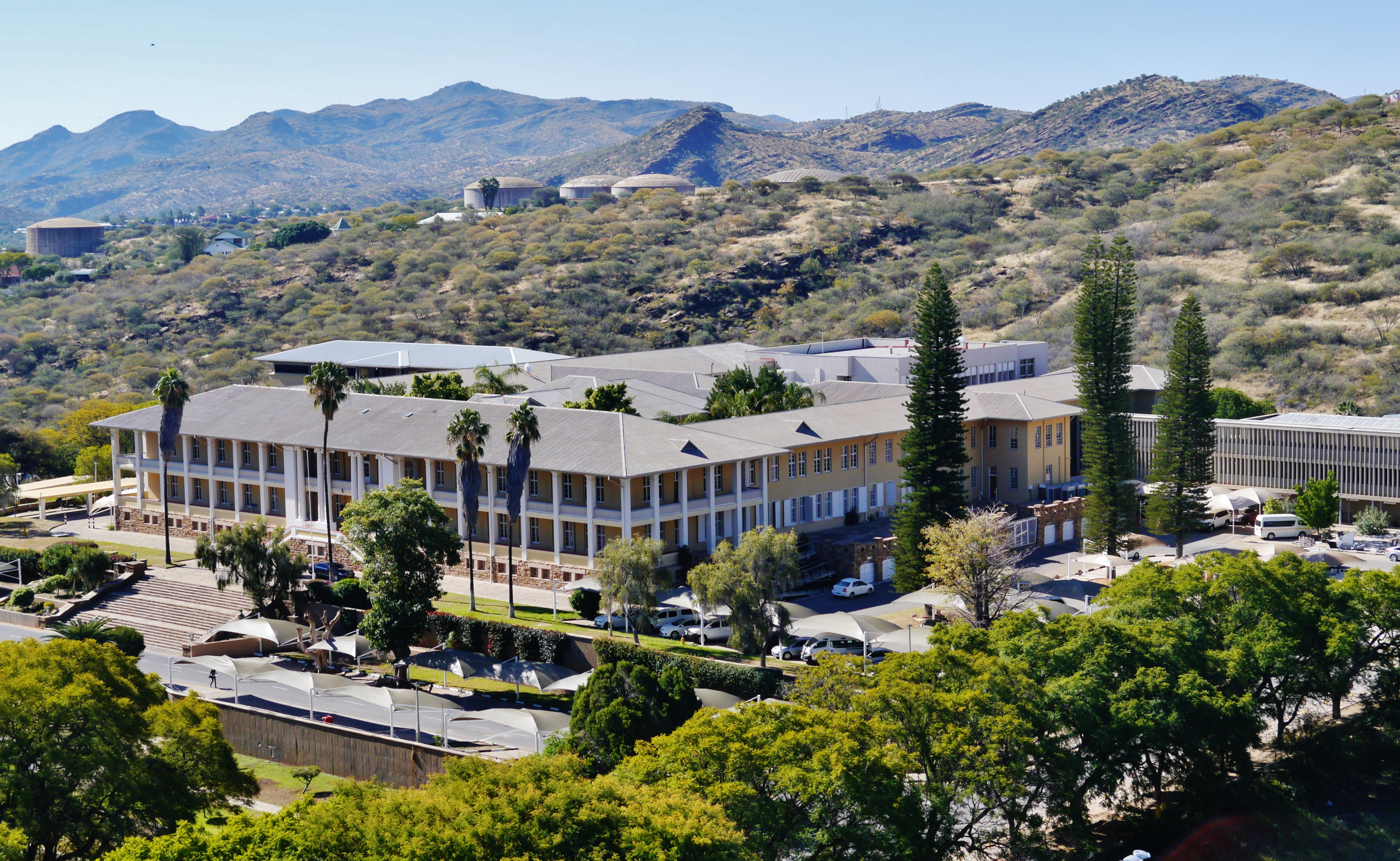
- Tintenpalast, Windhoek, Khomas Region, Namibia

Website
- www.parliament.na

The Parliament of Namibia is the national legislature of Namibia. It is a bicameral legislature that consists of two houses: the National Council (upper house) and the National Assembly (lower house).

All cabinet members are also members of the lower house. This situation has been criticised by Namibia's civil society and the opposition as creating a significant overlap between executive and legislature, undermining the separation of powers. The seniority of cabinet members generally relegates ordinary MPs to the back benches.

From Namibian independence until 2014, the National Assembly consisted of 78 members, 72 members elected by proportional representation and 6 members appointed by the president. The National Council had 26 representatives of the Regional Councils, 2 from each of the then thirteen regions. Before the 2014 general elections the constitution was amended to increase both chambers to their current size.

== Leadership ==
The National Assembly (lower house) elects a speaker and a deputy. Both lose their voting rights for the duration of their tenure. The current speaker is Saara Kuugongelwa; her deputy is Phillipus Katamelo (both SWAPO). The National Council (upper house) elects a chairperson.

== See also ==
- Politics of Namibia
- List of legislatures by country
