= National Assembly (Namibia) =

Lower house of the Parliament of Namibia

- 8th National Assembly

Type
- Type: Lower House of the Parliament of Namibia

History
- Founded: 21 March 1990

Leadership
- Speaker: Saara Kuugongelwa, SWAPO since 21 March 2025
- Deputy Speaker: Phillipus Katamelo, SWAPO since 21 March 2025

Structure
- Seats: 104
- Political groups: Government (59) SWAPO (51) Appointed members (8) Official opposition (20) IPC (20) Other parties (25) AR (6) PDM (5) LPM (5) UDF (1) NEFF (1) SWANU (1) RP (1) NUDO (1) APP (1) NDP (1) BCP (1)
- Length of term: 5 years

Elections
- Voting system: Closed list proportional representation and appointments by the President
- First election: 4–5 December 1994
- Last election: 27–30 November 2024
- Next election: 2029

Meeting place
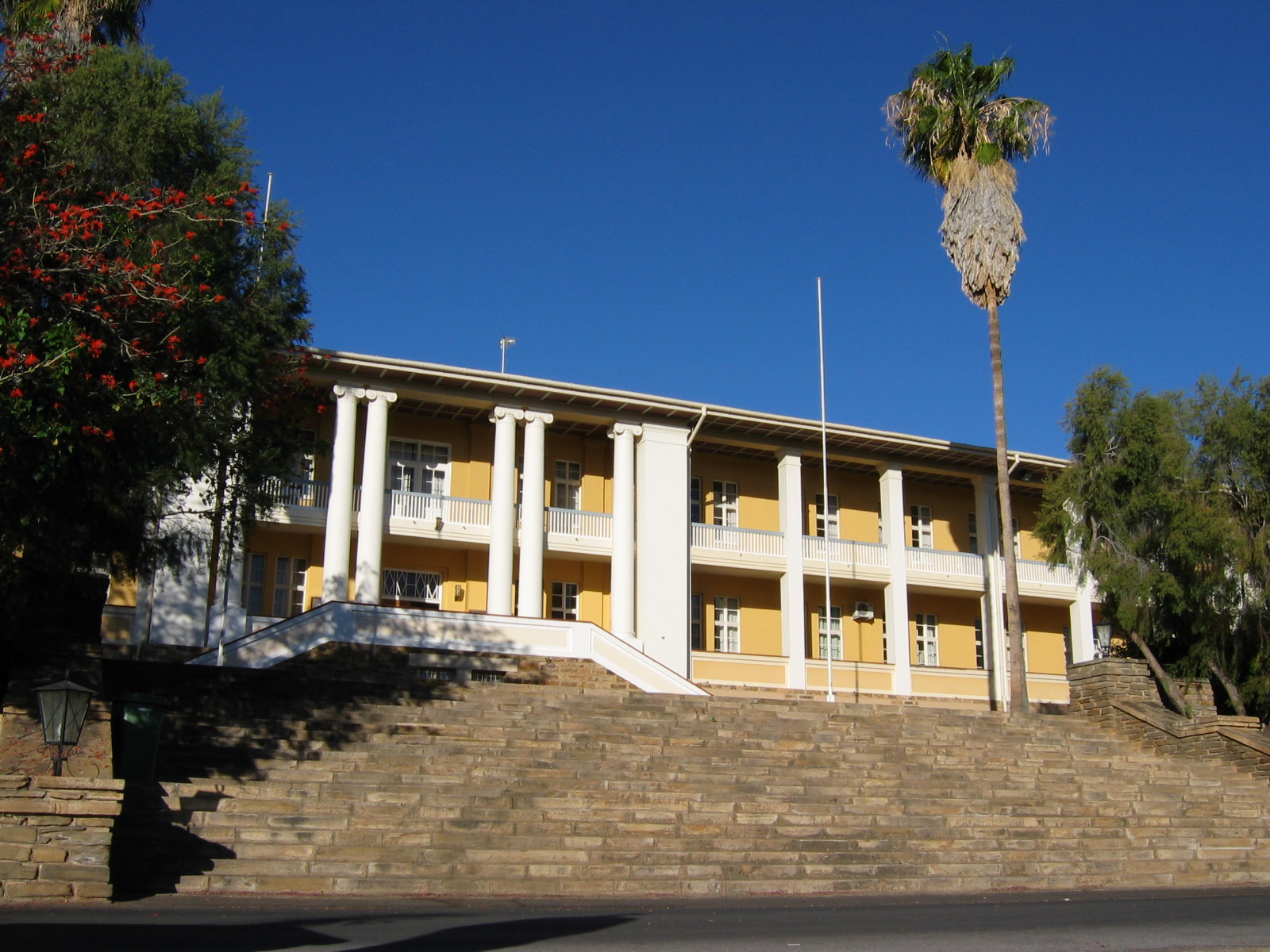
- Tintenpalast, Windhoek, Khomas Region, Namibia

Website
- Parliament of Namibia

The National Assembly is the lower chamber of Namibia's bicameral Parliament. Its laws must be approved by the National Council, the upper house. Since 2014, it has a total of 104 members. 96 members are directly elected through a system of closed list proportional representation and serve five-year terms. Eight additional members are appointed by the President. Since March 2025, SWAPO member Saara Kuugongelwa has been the Speaker of the National Assembly.

Namibia's National Assembly emerged on Independence Day on 21 March 1990 from the Constituent Assembly of Namibia, following the elections of November 1989. That election, under guidelines established by the United Nations, was monitored by foreign observers in an effort to ensure a free and fair election process. The current National Assembly was formed following elections on 27 November 2024.

== 2024 elections ==
Party	Votes	%	+/–	Seats	+/–
SWAPO	583,300	53.38	-12.07	51	−12
Independent Patriots for Change	220,809	20.21	New	20	New
Affirmative Repositioning	72,227	6.61	New	6	New
Popular Democratic Movement	59,839	5.48	-11.17	5	−11
Landless People's Movement	56,971	5.21	+0.46	5	+1
United Democratic Front	16,828	1.54	-0.25	1	−1
Namibian Economic Freedom Fighters	11,743	1.07	-0.59	1	−1
SWANU	11,484	1.05	+0.40	1	0
Republican Party	10,942	1.00	-0.77	1	−1
National Unity Democratic Organisation	10,687	0.98	-0.98	1	−1
All People's Party	7,219	0.66	-1.13	1	−1
National Democratic Party	6,647	0.61	+0.05	1	+1
Body of Christ Party	5,763	0.53	New	1	New
Rally for Democracy and Progress	3,308	0.30	-0.79	0	−1
National Empowerment Fighting Corruption	3,216	0.29	New	0	New
United Namibians Party	2,706	0.25	New	0	New
Action Democratic Movement Party	2,286	0.21	New	0	New
United People's Movement	2,143	0.20	New	0	New
Congress of Democrats	1,800	0.16	-0.40	0	0
Christian Democratic Voice	1,452	0.13	-0.58	0	−1
National Patriotic Front	1,315	0.12	-0.10	0	0
Appointed members				8	0
Total	1,092,685	100.00	–	103	0
Valid votes	1,092,685	98.57			
Invalid/blank votes	15,898	1.43			
Total votes	1,108,583	100.00			
Registered voters/turnout	1,449,569	76.48	+16.10		
Source: Electoral Commission of Namibia (votes, 100% reported); Namvotes (seats, 87.63% reported)

== Previous National Assembly election results ==
Political party	Election Year						
Political party	1989	1994	1999	2004	2009	2014	2019
South-West Africa People's Organisation (SWAPO)	41	53	55	55	54	77	63
Popular Democratic Movement (PDM)	21	15	7	4	2	5	16
Landless People's Movement (LPP)	-	-	-	-	-	-	4
National Unity Democratic Organization (NUDO)	-	-	-	3	2	2	2
All People's Party (APP)	-	-	-	-	1	2	2
United Democratic Front (UDF)	4	2	2	3	2	2	2
Republican Party (RP)	-	-	-	1	1	1	2
Namibian Economic Freedom Fighters (NEFF)	-	-	-	-	-	-	2
Rally for Democracy and Progress (RDP)	-	-	-	-	8	3	1
Christian Democratic Voice (CDV)	-	-	-	-	-	-	1
South West Africa National Union (SWANU)	-	0	0	0	1	1	1
Congress of Democrats (COD)	-	-	7	5	1	0	0
Monitor Action Group (MAG)	-	1	1	1	0	0	-
Democratic Coalition of Namibia (DCN)	-	1	0	-	-	-	-
Federal Convention of Namibia (FCN)	1	0	0	-	-	-	-
Action Christian National (ACN)	3	-	-	-	-	-	-
Namibia Patriotic Front (NPF)	1	-	-	-	-	-	-
Namibia National Front (NNF)	1	-	-	-	-	-	-
Total	72	72	72	72	72	96	96

Despite being a one-party dominant state since its independence in 1990, Namibian elections have been transparent, free, and largely fair.

== See also ==
- National Council of Namibia - the upper chamber of Parliament
- History of Namibia
- List of National Assemblies of Namibia
- List of speakers of the National Assembly of Namibia
- Legislative branch
- List of national legislatures
