= List of members of the 7th National Assembly of Namibia =

Below is a list of members of the 7th National Assembly of Namibia. They were selected by their parties based on the results of the 2019 parliamentary election. This National Assembly was inaugurated on 20 March 2020. Like each of the previous National Assemblies, it is led by the South West Africa People's Organization. The 7th National Assembly has 104 seats. 96 candidates were elected according to party lists and are assembled below in the order they appear on their party lists.

== South West Africa People's Organization (SWAPO) ==
- Netumbo Nandi-Ndaitwah
- Sophia Shaningwa
- Pohamba Shifeta
- Lucia Iipumbu
- Tom Alweendo
- Saara Kuugongelwa-Amadhila
- Johanna Kandjimi
- Peya Mushelenga
- Alexia Manombe-Ncube
- Calle Schlettwein
- Lucia Witbooi
- Nangolo Mbumba (resigned immediately due to his appointment as Vice-President)
- Christine ǁHoebes
- Erastus Uutoni
- Itah Kandjii-Murangi
- Hamunyera Hambyuka
- Hilma Nicanor
- Stanley Simataa (until March 2020)
- Bernadette Jagger
- John Mutorwa
- Annakleta Sikerete
- Peter Katjavivi
- Margaret Mensah-Williams
- Royal ǀUiǀoǀoo
- Sylvia Makgone
- Kletus Karondo
- Heather Sibungu
- Tobie Aupindi
- Fenny Nanyeni
- Jerry Ekandjo
- Frans Kapofi
- Bertha Dinyando-Nyambe
- Verna Sinimbo
- Hafeni Ndemula
- Veno Kauaria
- Natangwe Ithete
- Anna Nghipondoka
- Vincent Mareka
- Nono Katjiingisua
- Daniel Kashikola
- Agnes Tjongarero
- Leon Jooste
- Juliet Kavetuna
- Mandela Kapere
- Maria Elago
- Modestus Amutse
- Loide Kasingo
- Penda Ya Ndakolo
- Paula Kooper
- Albert Kawana
- Jennely Matundu
- Doreen Sioka
- Leevi Katoma
- Faustina Caley
- Utoni Nujoma
- Kornelia Shilunga
- Tjekero Tweya
- Emilia Nuyoma-Amupewa
- Derek Klazen
- Agnes Kafula
- Alpheus !Naruseb
- Anna Shiweda
- Sebastian Karupu
- Maureen Hinda-Mbuende (replacing Nangolo Mbumba)
- Gothard Kasuto (replacing Stanley Simataa)

== Popular Democratic Movement (PDM) ==
- McHenry Venaani
- Jennifer Van den Heever
- Diederik Vries
- Vipuakuje Muharukua
- Nicolaas Smit
- Jan van Wyk
- Elma Dienda
- Esmeralda ǃAebes (ruled out 30 May 2033)
- Johannes Martin (ruled out on 30 May 2022)
- Kazeongere Tjeundo (ruled out on 30 May 2022)
- Inna Hengari
- Geoffrey Mwilima (ruled out on 30 May 2022)
- Elizabeth Becker
- Timotheus Shihumbu (ruled out on 30 May 2022)
- Winnie Moongo
- Pieter Mostert (ruled out on 30 May 2022)
- Maximalliant Katjimune (sworn in on 6 June 2022)
- Charmaine Tjirare (sworn in on 6 June 2022)
- Hidipo Hamata (sworn in on 6 June 2022)
- Yvette Araes (sworn in on 6 June 2022)
- Reggie Diergaardt (sworn in on 6 June 2022)
- Mike Venaani (sworn in on 6 June 2022)

== Landless People's Movement (LPM) ==
- Bernadus Swartbooi
- Henny Seibeb
- Edson Isaacks
- Utaara Mootu

== National Unity Democratic Organisation (NUDO) ==
- Esther Muinjangue
- Josef Kauandenge

== All People's Party (APP) ==
- Ignatius Shixwameni
- Erastus Shuumbwa

== United Democratic Front (UDF) ==
- Apius Auchab
- Themistokles Dudu Murorua

== Republican Party (RP) ==
- Clara Gowases (Until June 2020)
- Mathias Mbundu

== Namibian Economic Freedom Fighters (NEFF) ==
- Epafras Mukwiilongo
- Longinus Iipumbu

== Rally for Democracy and Progress (RDP) ==
- Mike Kavekotora

== Christian Democratic Voice (CDV) ==
- Gotthard Kandume

== SWANU ==
- Tangeni Iiyambo

== Members appointed by the president ==
Then-president Hage Geingob appointed eight additional members without voting rights in March 2020, seven of them in order to serve as ministers or deputies in Namibia's cabinet:

1. Ipumbu Shiimi, Minister of Finance
2. Emma Kantema-Gaomas, Deputy Minister of Youth, Sports and Culture
3. Veikko Nekundi, Deputy Minister of Works and Transport
4. Natalia ǀGoagoses
5. Kalumbi Shangula, Minister of Health
6. Yvonne Dausab, Minister of Justice
7. Peter Vilho, Minister of Defence and Veteran Affairs (until April 2021)
  - Patience Masua
8. Emma Theofilus, Deputy Minister of Information and Communication Technology

National Assembly of Namibia
Preceded by 6th National Assembly	7th National Assembly; 21 March 2020 – 21 March 2025	Succeeded by 8th National Assembly
