= List of political parties in Namibia =

Namibia is a dominant-party state with the South-West Africa People's Organisation in power. Opposition parties are allowed, but are widely considered to have no real chance of gaining power. In Namibian politics, ethnicity plays a significant role in party affiliation and voting behaviour. Some parties are dominated by single ethnic groups; SWAPO itself, its government, and administration, is pre-dominantly Ovambo.

== Parties with parliamentary seats ==
Parties with seats in the National Assembly of Namibia after the 2024 elections are:

Party	Abbr.	Leader	Political position	Ideology	Council	Assembly
South West Africa People’s Organisation; Afrikaans: Suidwes-Afrikaanse Volks Organisasie; German: Südwestafrikanische Volksorganisation	SWAPO; SWAVO	Netumbo Nandi-Ndaitwah	Centre-left	Socialism with Namibian characteristics	28 / 42	51 / 104
Independent Patriots for Change	IPC	Panduleni Itula		Grassroots democracy	2 / 42	20 / 104
Affirmative Repositioning	AR	Job Amupanda	Left-wing	Marxism-Leninism; Pan-Africanism	0 / 42	7 / 104
Popular Democratic Movement; Afrikaans: Populêre Demokratiese Beweging	PDM	McHenry Venaani	Centre-right	Conservatism; Economic liberalism	2 / 42	5 / 104
Landless People's Movement	LPM	Bernadus Swartbooi	Centre-left to left-wing	Social democracy Progressivism; Land reform Environmentalism	6 / 42	5 / 104
United Democratic Front	UDF	Apius Auchab		Damara interests	2 / 42	1 / 104
Namibian Economic Freedom Fighters	NEFF	Epafras Mukwiilongo	Far-left	Marxism–Leninism; Pan-Africanism; Anti-capitalism	0 / 42	1 / 104
South West Africa National Union	SWANU	Tangeni Iiyambo	Left-wing	Democratic socialism Left-wing nationalism	0 / 42	1 / 104
Republican Party; German: Republikanische Partei	RP	Henk Mudge	Right-wing	Conservatism; Christian democracy	0 / 42	1 / 104
National Unity Democratic Organisation	NUDO	Esther Muinjangue	Centre-right	Herero interests	1 / 42	1 / 104
All People's Party	APP	Ignatius Shixwameni	Centre-left	Social democracy	0 / 42	1 / 104
National Democratic Party	NDP	Martin Lukato			0 / 42	1 / 104
Body of Christ Party	BCP	Festus Thomas	Right-wing	Christian democracy	0 / 42	1 / 104

== Unrepresented parties ==
The following parties contested the 2024 parliamentary elections but did not gain a seat, in the order of votes obtained:

- Rally for Democracy and Progress (RDP, 3,308 votes)
- National Empowerment Fighting Corruption (NEFC, 3,216 votes)
- United Namibians Party (UNP, 2,706 votes)
- Action Democratic Movement Party (ADM): took part in the 2024 Namibian general election and received 2,286 votes (0.21%). The interim party president is Vincent Kanyetu, who was previously secretary general of the All People's Party (APP) and before that of the Democratic Turnhalle Alliance (DTA).
- United People's Movement (UPM, 2,143 votes)
- Congress of Democrats (CoD, 1,800 votes)
- Christian Democratic Voice (CDV, 1,452 votes)
- National Patriotic Front (NPF, 1,315 votes)

== Parties of local relevance ==
The following parties did not contest the 2019 general elections but took part in the 2020 local authority election, and gained seats:

- Gobabis Residents' Association, 1 seat in Gobabis
- Karibib Ratepayers Association, 1 seat in Karibib
- Monitor Action Group, 1 seat in Outjo
- Okahandja Rate Payers Association, 1 seat in Okahandja
- Omaruru Community Development Association, 1 seat in Omaruru
- Rehoboth Independent Town Management Association, 1 seat in Rehoboth
- United People's Movement (UPM), 1 seat in Rehoboth
- Rundu Concerned Citizens Association, 1 seat in Rundu
- Rundu Urban Community Association, 1 seat in Rundu
- Swakopmund Residents Association, 2 seats in Swakopmund
- Joint Walvis Bay Residents Association, 1 seat in Walvis Bay

== Defunct parties ==
National parties

- Communist Party of Namibia
- Democratic Action for Namas
- Democratic Coalition of Namibia (DCN): One seat in parliament 1995–2000, 2 seats in local town councils 1998–2004
- Democratic Party of Namibia (DPN)
- Namibia African People's Democratic Organisation
- Namibian Democratic Movement for Change
- National Progressive Party
- Rehoboth Volksparty
- United Nama Independence People's Party
- United Namib Independence Party
- United Namibia People's Party
- Workers Revolutionary Party (WRP)

Local parties

- Civic Association of Henties Bay
- Concerned Peoples Organization Keetmanshoop (1 council seat in Keetmanshoop, 1998)
- Okahandja Rate Payers' Association (1 council seat in Okahandja, 1998)
- Omaruru Residents Association (1 council seat in Omaruru, 1998)

Banned parties

- United Democratic Party
