= Keetmanshoop Urban =

Electoral constituency in ǁKaras region, Namibia

Coordinates: 26°35′S 18°8′E

Keetmanshoop Urban constituency (red) in the ǁKaras Region

Keetmanshoop Urban is a constituency in the ǁKaras Region of Namibia. It comprises the city of Keetmanshoop, except the Krönlein suburb, covering an area of 524 km^{2} (202 sq mi). It had a population of 19,447 in 2011, up from 15,777 in 2001. As of 2020 the constituency had 12,569 registered voters, up from 11,534 in 2019.

== Politics ==
Keetmanshoop Rural is traditionally a stronghold of the South West Africa People's Organization (SWAPO) party. Four of the six seats in the local authority election of 2020 were won by the Landless People's Movement party, however.

=== Regional and local elections ===
In the 2004 regional elections, Hilma Nicanor (SWAPO) was elected with 1,872 of the 3,803 votes cast.

In the 2015 regional elections Councillor Nicanor (SWAPO) was again reelected with 2,291 votes. She defeated challengers Fredrik Kuhlmann of the Democratic Turnhalle Alliance (DTA, 551 votes) and Peter John Visser of the Rally for Democracy and Progress (RDP, 378 votes). After councillor Nicanor was fielded as a parliamentary candidate in the 2019 Namibian general election, a by-election became necessary for Keetmannshoop Urban because Namibian electoral law prohibits sitting councillors and members of the public service to run for a seat in parliament.

The by-election was conducted on 15 January 2020. Maxie Minnaar of the Landless People's Movement (LPM, a new party registered in 2018) won with 1,958 votes, followed by Festus Shilimela (SWAPO, 1,306 votes) and Abraham ǀGoagoseb (Popular Democratic Movement (PDM), the new name of the Democratic Turnhalle Alliance, 292 votes). Minnaar died in August 2020. Considering that the next regional election was only months away, the Electoral Commission of Namibia decided to keep the councillor position vacant until then. The 2020 regional election was also won by the LPM. Its candidate Joseph Isaacks obtained 3,016 votes, well ahead of the SWAPO candidate Emrico Blaauw who came second with 1,849 votes. In April 2026, Isaacks has been suspended from the LPM, following remarks accusing party leader Bernadus Swartbooi of being a dictator.

=== General elections ===
Namibian general election, 2014
Party	Votes	%
SWAPO	3,933	70.4%
PDM	550	9.8%
RDP	355	6.4%
RP	158	2.8%
APP	135	2.4%
Democratic Party of Namibia	80	1.4%
Monitor Action Group	71	1.3%
WRP	63	1.1%
COD	46	0.8%
UPM	39	0.7%
UDF	37	0.7%
NEFF	34	0.6%
Total votes	5,590	100.0%
Registered voters	10,197	54.8%
Source: Electoral Commission of Namibia Archived 2018-03-26 at the Wayback Machine
