= Mathias Mbundu =

Namibian politician

Mathias Mbundu MP

Member of the National Assembly of Namibia
- Incumbent
- Assumed office 20 March 2015

Personal details
- Born: Mathias Mbundu; 9 January 1985 (age 41)
- Party: Republican Party
- Education: Polytechnic of Namibia
- Occupation: Member of Parliament
- Profession: Politician

Mathias Mbundu (born 9 January 1985) is a Namibian politician and the current deputy secretary-general of the Republican Party. He has been serving as a Member of the National Assembly since March 2015. After the death of Clara Gowases in June 2020, Mbundu was appointed as the party's leader in the assembly.

== Biography ==
Mbundu was born on 9 January 1985. He achieved a diploma in business administration from the Association of German Chambers of Industry and Commerce and later obtained a certificate in applied business management from the Polytechnic of Namibia.

Mbundu is a member of the Republican Party. He was elected to the National Assembly in November 2014. He was sworn in as an MP in March 2015 and served as the party's chief whip. In October 2019, he was elected as the party's deputy secretary-general. Mbundu won another term as an MP in November 2019.

In June 2020, Clara Gowases, the party's leader in the National Assembly, died. As a result, Mbundu was chosen as the party's new caucus leader.
