= Longinus Iipumbu =

Namibian politician

Longinus Iipumbu MP

Member of the National Assembly of Namibia
- Incumbent
- Assumed office 20 March 2020

National Coordinator of the Namibian Economic Freedom Fighters
- Incumbent
- Assumed office 24 June 2014
- President: Epafras Mukwiilongo
- Preceded by: Position established

Personal details
- Born: Longinus Kalimbo Iipumbu
- Party: Namibian Economic Freedom Fighters
- Occupation: Member of Parliament
- Profession: Politician

Longinus Kalimbo Iipumbu is a Namibian politician who has been serving as a Member of the National Assembly of Namibia for the Namibian Economic Freedom Fighters since 2020. He is the party's national coordinator and chief whip in parliament. Iipumbu was the youth leader of the Congress of Democrats.

== Political career ==
Iipumbu joined the Congress of Democrats at a young age and was elected the party's youth leader. He was suspended as youth leader in 2010 on allegations of financial mismanagement and consequently left the party. He later joined the Namibian Economic Freedom Fighters in June 2014. He was appointed its inaugural national coordinator, the second-highest position in the party. The NEFF is similar to the South African Economic Freedom Fighters in its economic policies, yet differ on social ideologies. The party failed to win any parliamentary representation in that year's general election.

In the 2019 general election, the party won two seats in the National Assembly. Iipumbu and party leader Epafras Mukwiilongo filled the seats in March 2020. Mukwiilongo appointed him as the chief whip of the party.
