= Maxie Minnaar =

Namibian politician (died 2020)

Regional Councillor for Keetmanshoop Urban
- In office 17 January 2020 – 10 August 2020
- Preceded by: Hilma Nicanor
- Succeeded by: Joseph Isaacks

Personal details
- Died: 10 August 2020 (aged 47) Windhoek, Namibia
- Party: Landless People's Movement
- Occupation: Regional Councillor
- Profession: Politician

Maxie Meliza Minnaar (died 10 August 2020) was a Namibian politician. She served as the regional councillor for Keetmanshoop Urban in the ǁKaras Region from January 2020 until her death in August 2020. She was a member of the Landless People's Movement party and the party's first regional councillor.

== Political career ==
Minnaar was a member of the ruling SWAPO and worked for the ǁKaras Region before joining the Landless People's Movement. She was the leader of the party's women command and a member of the party's political action committee.

In 2019, incumbent SWAPO regional councillor for Keetmanshoop Urban, Hilma Nicanor, resigned to contest a parliamentary seat in that year's general election. A by-election was promptly called for and Minnaar was fielded as the LPM's candidate. She campaigned on building a drug and alcohol rehabilitation centre in the region, if elected. Minnaar won the by-election on 15 January 2020 and consequently became the LPM's first regional councillor. She was sworn in on 17 January.

== Death ==
Minnaar died on 10 August 2020 at the Lady Pohamba Private Hospital in the capital Windhoek. She was 47 years old and is survived by her parents and son. Various politicians paid tribute to Minnaar, including LPM national leader Bernadus Swartbooi, who called her a "modern-day female revolutionary". Since regional elections are set to be held in November, the Electoral Commission of Namibia opted to keep the councillor position vacant until the election.
