= 1992 Namibian local and regional elections =

Local Authority Council and Regional Council elections were held in Namibia from 30 November to 3 December 1992. It was the first set of such elections since independence. SWAPO won a majority of seats in both Local Authority Councils and Regional Councils.

There was some violence during the election, including the killing of a DTA candidate by SWAPO militants.

== Electoral system ==
Elections for regional councils are held using the first-past-the-post electoral system. Voters in each constituency elect one councillor to represent them on their regional council. Local authority councillors are elected by a system of proportional representation.

== Results ==
=== Local Authority Councils ===
Party	Votes	%	Seats
SWAPO	73,736	58.05	184
Democratic Turnhalle Alliance	42,278	33.29	116
United Democratic Front	7,473	5.88	18
SWANU	1,895	1.49	1
Local Associations	1,516	1.19	1
Workers Revolutionary Party	115	0.09	0
Total	127,013	100.00	320
Valid votes	127,013	98.54	
Invalid/blank votes	1,879	1.46	
Total votes	128,892	100.00	
Registered voters/turnout	156,795	82.20	

=== Regional Councils ===
A total of 534,437 voters were registered, but 64,431 were in uncontested constituencies.

Party	Votes	%	Seats
SWAPO	256,778	68.76	71
Democratic Turnhalle Alliance	103,359	27.68	21
United Democratic Front	9,285	2.49	3
SWANU	2,696	0.72	0
National Patriotic Front	734	0.20	0
Workers Revolutionary Party	175	0.05	0
Independents	430	0.12	0
Total	373,457	100.00	95
Valid votes	373,457	98.01	
Invalid/blank votes	7,584	1.99	
Total votes	381,041	100.00	
Registered voters/turnout	470,006	81.07	
