= Leaders of Damaraland =

Tenure	Incumbent	Affiliation
29 December 1980 to May 1989	Justus ǁGaroëb, Chairman of the Executive Committee	Damara Council (DC)

== See also ==
- Namibia
- Damara
- Bantustans in South West Africa
- Apartheid
- Presidents of Namibia
- Prime Ministers of Namibia
