= Werner Mamugwe =

Namibian politician (1936–1998)

Werner Henry Mamugwe (7 February 1936 – 25 May 1998) was a Namibian politician. In the late 1950s he became a leading figure in nationalist politics and community struggles in Windhoek, and would go on to become a key leader of the South West African National Union (SWANU).

== Youth ==
Mamugwe was born of 7 February 1936, in Windhoek, and grew up in Old Location. As a young man, he trained boxing. Mamugwe was one of very few African matriculants in South West Africa at the time. He became involved in nationalist politics, and in 1957 he joined the South West Africa Progressive Association (SWAPA). He became a member of the SWAPA leadership. He led protests in Old Location against the forced relocation of the community to Katutura. When the South African authorities initially refused Andimba Toivo ya Toivo permission to stay overnight at Old Location, Mamugwe convinced the pass officer to issue a temporary pass. Mamugwe helped edit the newspaper South West News - Suidwes Nuus, and was a frequent contributor to Contact and New Age.

== SWANU chair, imprisonment and exile ==
Mamugwe took part in the founding of the South West African National Union (SWANU) in 1959. He served as acting SWANU chairman. Mamugwe functioned as a liaison between the exiled SWANU External Council in Francistown (Bechuanaland) and the SWANU organization inside South West Africa. In 1962 he was banned from re-entering Bechuanaland due to his political activities.

He went into exile in May 1965, settling in Lusaka. From Lusaka he journeyed to Israel to study at the Afro-Asian Institute for Cooperative and Labour Studies, an institution set up by the Histadrut in Tel-Aviv in 1960. While there, he received military training. In August 1966 he attempted to re-enter South West Africa through the Caprivi strip, but was arrested. He was held and interrogated on Impalila Island for four days, then taken to Katima Mulilo where he was held in solitary confinement for three weeks. On 7 September 1966, he was transferred to Pretoria Central Prison. He was held for seven months without trial.

Then, without explanation, the South African authorities transported Mamugwe and Kuaima Riruako to the Caprivi Strip, and left both in the wilderness to fend for themselves. After three days they were rescued by Zambian fishermen. Mamugwe shifted to Lusaka, where he attended college. He later moved to Dar-es-Salaam, and then shifted to Uganda where he enrolled at the Makerere University. His studies at Makerere University were cut short by the internal turmoil in Uganda, and he shifted to Nairobi where he was eventually granted asylum status. He served as the SWANU Representative in Central and East Africa, and addressed many international forums such as the United Nations Special Committee Against Apartheid. He returned to his home country in 1977.

== WRP leader ==
On 1 May 1989, Mamugwe, Attie Beukes and Erica Beukes launched the Workers Revolutionary Party (WRP) at a meeting in the Khomasdal Community Hall. Soon thereafter the WRP joined the Socialist Alliance of Namibia (SAN), with Mamugwe becoming one of two SAN acting secretaries alongside Rirua Karihangana. But in August 1989 WRP joined the United Democratic Front (UDF) ahead of the 1989 Namibian parliamentary election, leaving SAN in limbo.

Mamugwe died on 25 May 1998. He was buried in Windhoek. After Mamugwe's death Hewat Beukes took over the role as WRP political secretary.
