= Teopolina Mushelenga =

Namibian politician

Teopolina Mushelenga (born 11 December 1957 in Omagola-Oshigambo, Oshikoto Region) is a Namibian politician. A member of SWAPO, she was first elected to the National Assembly of Namibia in the 1999 elections, and was subsequently reelected in 2004. After the election of Hifikepunye Pohamba that year, she was appointed deputy minister for home affairs and immigration. Prior to the 2009 general election, Mushelenga was placed 59th on SWAPO's electoral list of 72 candidates for the National Assembly. The top 54 SWAPO candidates on the list were elected, leaving her out of the National Assembly.

== Career ==
Mushelenga began her career as a teacher at Oluno Junior Secondary School in Ondangwa, then taught at Ovamboland in 1980. In 1983, she joined SWAPO and subsequently went into exile in Kwanza Sul, Angola, where she taught at the SWAPO Education Centre until 1986. In 1990, on the independence of Namibia, she returned to Oluno School in Ondangwa, where she stayed until she entered politics in 1992.

== Politics ==
Mushelenga was elected to the town council of Ondangwa in 1992 and stayed in that position until 2000. She was chosen as mayor of Ondangwa in 1992–1995 and 1998–2000. From 2000 to 2010 she was a member of the National Assembly.

== Committees served on ==
Mushelenga was selected to be part of the sub-committee of the National Assembly which was created to look into allegations that only Herero-speaking Namibians had been chosen to fill high-level posts during that time.
