= Frans Migub ǀGoagoseb =

Namibian politician and Damara leader

Chief Frans Migub ǀGoagoseb (born 16 June 1954) is a Namibian politician and Damara leader. He is the party leader of the Namibian Democratic Movement for Change and was the party's candidate for president in the 2009 general election. In that election, ǀGoagoseb received 1,760 votes (0.22% of all votes nationally for president), placing eleventh out of twelve candidates for president. Only Attie Beukes of the Communist Party of Namibia received fewer votes than ǀGoagoseb.

== Career ==
ǀGoagoseb was born in 1954 in Gobabis, then South West Africa. He was attended primary school in Gobabis and secondary school in Khorixas, Kunene Region. He became active in politics in 1974 as a member of the Damara Council (DC). The DC later transformed into the South West Africa People's Democratic United Front (SWAPDUF), which took part in the Turnhalle Constitutional Conference (1975–1977). ǀGoagoseb was among the first to request that the Damaras be given their own Bantustan government. Damaraland was founded in 1980 with Justus ǁGaroëb as its head. In 1977, ǀGoagoseb was a founding member of the Democratic Turnhalle Alliance, with which he was the primary organizer. Following independence, he was elected as the regional councillor for Gobabis twice, in 1992 and 1998. In 2003, he resigned from DTA to form the Namibian Democratic Movement for Change (NDMC). In 2009, he was chosen as for the party's top spot on the list of National Assembly candidates as well as the party's candidate for President but did not earn a seat in the National Assembly.

=== 2009 presidential campaign ===
In the 2009 presidential elections, ǀGoagoseb received 1,760 votes for president. His strongest showing was in the Rehoboth Rural, where he placed 2nd of the 12 candidates with 674 votes, only behind Katuutire Kaura of DTA, who received 1,114 votes. Overall, ǀGoagoseb received 1001 votes in the central Hardap Region, or 57% of his total votes nationally. He next best constituency was his native Gobabis, where he finished in 5th place with 298 votes.
