= 7th National Assembly =

7th National Assembly may refer to:

- 7th National Assembly of Cambodia
- 7th National Assembly of France
- 7th National Assembly of Laos
- 7th National Assembly of Namibia
- 7th Nigeria National Assembly
- 7th National Assembly of Serbia
- 7th National Assembly of Slovenia
