= Elizabeth Becker =

Elizabeth Becker may refer to:

- Elizabeth Becker (journalist) (born 1947), American journalist and author
- Elizabeth Becker (politician), Namibian politician
- Elizabeth Becker Henley (born 1952), American playwright, screenwriter, and actress
- Elizabeth Becker-Pinkston (1903–1989), American diver

== See also ==
- Elisabeth Becker, Nazi concentration camp overseer
