= Asser (disambiguation) =

Asser may refer to:

- Asser, a Welsh monk who wrote a life of Alfred the Great
- Asser (name)
- Turnbull & Asser, clothing company
- T.M.C. Asser Instituut, legal research institute
