= Johanna Kandjimi =

Namibian politician

Johanna Kandjimi MP

Member of the National Assembly of Namibia
- Incumbent
- Assumed office 20 March 2015

Personal details
- Born: Johanna Kandjimi; 8 August 1961 (age 64) Rupara, Kavango West, South West Africa
- Party: SWAPO
- Occupation: Member of Parliament
- Profession: Politician

Johanna Kandjimi (born 8 August 1961) is a Namibian politician who serves as a Member of the National Assembly of Namibia, representing the ruling SWAPO party. She was sworn in as a parliamentarian in March 2015 after her election in November 2014.

== Life and career ==
Johanna Kandjimi was born on 8 August 1961 in Rupara, Kavango West in the former South West Africa. She matriculated from Leevi Hakusembe Secondary School in 1980. She worked for the Rudolf Ngondo Supermarket between 1982 and 1988. From 1987 to 1997, she was an assistant manager at a Pep store. In 1988, she found employment at a Harties Store and worked for the store until 1992.

Also in 1988, she became active in politics and was elected a regional treasurer of the Namibia Food and Allied Workers Union (NAFAU). Between 1988 and 1989, she was a regional mobilization officer at SWAPO. She became chairperson of the Rundu, Tsumkwe People’s Foundation in 1995. She was appointed deputy chair of the Uukumwe Cultural Dance Group and a SWAPO Women regional council coordinator in 1998. Kandjimi was elected deputy chair of the Village Development Committee in 2004 and served in the post until 2009.

In 2013, she was promoted to be a regional coordinator for SWAPO, therefore relinquishing her role as a SWAPO Women regional council coordinator. In November 2014, she was elected as an MP and was sworn in as one in early-2015. She resigned from the Uukumwe Cultural Dance Group, the Rundu, Tsumkwe People’s Foundation and her position as a regional coordinator in the same year.

Kandjimi has largely been a backbencher during her tenure as an MP. She was re-elected for a second term in 2019 as she placed eighth on the party's list.
