= 2027 in Namibia =

- Decades: 2000s; 2010s; 2020s
- See also: Other events of 2027; Timeline of Namibian history

Events in the year 2027 in Namibia.

== Events ==
=== Predicted and scheduled ===
- 4 October – 21 November – 2027 Cricket World Cup in South Africa, Zimbabwe and Namibia

== Holidays ==
- 1 January – New Year's Day
- 21 March – Independence Day
- 26 March – Good Friday
- 28 March – Easter Sunday
- 29 March – Easter Monday
- 1 May – International Workers' Day
- 4 May – Cassinga Day
- 6 May – Ascension Day
- 25 May – Africa Day
- 28 May – Genocide Remembrance Day
- 26 August – Heroes' Day
- 10 December – Human Rights Day
- 25 December – Christmas Day
- 26 December – Family Day
