= Communist Party of Namibia (1981) =

The Communist Party of Namibia was a communist party in Namibia. It was initially called the Party of Jacob Morenga because it was founded on the 74th anniversary of the death of Jacob Morenga on 3 October 1981 in Angola. The party general secretary was Rirua Karihangana.

In 1989, the CPN entered the Socialist Alliance of Namibia (SAN), which later joined the United Democratic Front of Namibia.
