= Gotthard Kandume =

Namibian politician

Gotthard Kandume MP

Member of the National Assembly of Namibia
- Incumbent
- Assumed office 20 March 2020

Personal details
- Born: 27 July 1972 (age 53) Otjiwarongo, South West Africa
- Party: Christian Democratic Voice
- Occupation: Member of Parliament
- Profession: Politician

Gotthard Kandume (born 27 July 1972) is a Namibian politician serving as the inaugural leader of the Christian Democratic Voice political party. He is the party's sole representative in the National Assembly.

== Life and career ==
Kandume was born in Otjiwarongo, South West Africa (now Namibia). He achieved a diploma in basic education in 1998. In 2005, he received a diploma in higher education. He obtained a diploma in geological studies in 2008. Between 2000 and 2008, he worked as a literacy promoter.

Kandume used to live in his car. He registered the Christian Democratic Voice party with the Electoral Commission of Namibia in 2014. The party failed to win any parliamentary representation in that year's general election.

In the 2019 general election, the party won a single seat in the National Assembly. Kandume was selected to fill the seat. He took office on 20 March 2020.

Kandume lives in Okahandja.
