= Somaeb =

Somaeb is a surname. Notable people with the surname include:

- Hendrik Somaeb (born 1992), Namibian international footballer
- Nico Somaeb (born 1981), Namibian politician
