= Veno Kauaria =

Namibian politician (1960–2021)

Venomuinjo Victorine Kavetu "Veno" Kauaria (24 October 1960 – 30 July 2021) was a Namibian politician who served as a member of the National Assembly of Namibia from 2020 till her death in 2021.

Kauaria served as deputy Minister of Higher Education, Training and Innovation in 2021, deputy permanent secretary of the Ministry of Education, Arts and Culture, deputy chairperson of the Namibian National Commission for UNESCO, director for Namibia Library and Archives Services, as well as deputy director for lifelong learning in the Ministry of Education.

== Education ==
In 1979, Kauaria left Namibia for the United Kingdom and the United States of America to study for a master's degree in Library and Information Sciences. She obtained her master's degree at Long Island University.

== Professional career ==
From 1991 to 2007 Kauaria worked as a founder director of the Information and Resources Centre at the United States embassy in Windhoek. She also represented different countries within the International Council on Archives (ICA), where she chaired ESARBICA (The Eastern and Southern Africa Branch) from 2009-2011. She served on ICA’s Executive Board, and was an active member of their section for the Archives of Literature and Art (SLA) Diasporic Archives: Preserving & Promoting access to Literary Archives. She worked for the Academy Library and the United States Cultural Centre in Windhoek. From 2016 to 2019, Kauaria served as a deputy executive director in the ministry of Basic Education, Art and Culture. Kauaria served as a member of the Namibia Library and Information Council (NLIC) and the National Information Workers Association of Namibia (NIWAN) as chairperson.

== Political career ==
Kauaria was a SWAPO member of 7th National Assembly from 2020 until her death before she was appointed a deputy Minister of Higher Education, Training and Innovation by President Hage Geingob in April 2021, the position she held until her death.

== Legacy ==
She died from COVID-19 complications in Windhoek at the age of 60.

Kauaria has been remembered as a nationalist and an educationalist, who served the interests of all Namibians. She had also engaged Teachers Union of Namibia (TUN) on the re-grading of education officers from grade 9 to grade 8. Moreover, Kauaria was remembered as a dedicated colleague as well as an experienced and tested educator.
