= Michael Goreseb =

Namibian politician (1955–2022)

Michael Bantu Goreseb

Personal details
- Born: 22 April 1955 Okombahe, Erongo Region
- Died: 8 August 2021 (aged 66) Windhoek, Namibia
- Party: United Democratic Front

Michael Bantu Goreseb (22 April 1955 - 8 August 2022). He was a Namibian politician.

He was a member of the United Democratic Front, Goreseb and served as a member of the National Assembly of Namibia since the 2004 parliamentary election until his death in 2021.

In the National Assembly, the Erongo Region native has been a member of the Standing Committee on Economics, Natural Resources and Public Administration, as well as the Standing Committee on Human Resources, Social and Community Development. Prior to entering national politics, Goreseb was mayor and town councillor of Usakos, Erongo from 1998 to 2003. In 1994, Goreseb earned a Diploma in Education from Windhoek College of Education.

== Political views ==
In 2005, Goreseb called the state of education in Namibia a "mess" and said the system had "failed the nation".

Goreseb died from COVID-19 in 2022.
