= Hansína =

Hansína is a given name. Notable people with the name include:

- Hansína Regína Björnsdóttir (1884–1973), Icelandic photographer
- Hansina Christiaan, Namibian politician
