= Jurie Viljoen =

Namibian politician (born 1942)

Johannes Jurie Viljoen (born 14 May 1942 in Aranos, Hardap Region) is a Namibian politician. Viljoen was a member of the 4th National Assembly of Namibia from 2005 to 2010. From 2005 to 2010, Viljoen was the only representative of the Monitor Action Group in the National Assembly.

== Education ==
Viljoen graduated from Potchefstroom University for Christian Higher Education (now part of North-West University) in 1966. In 1976, Viljoen graduated from the University of South Africa (UNISA), a distance learning university with a degree in history. He also graduated from the Rand Afrikaans University (now part of the University of Johannesburg) with a M.A. in history. A teacher by profession, Viljoen taught in Gobabis, Otjiwarongo, Mariental and Windhoek as well as a principal and school inspector.

== Politics ==
Viljoen took office following the 2004 legislative election, when his party, the MAG, appointed him to the National Assembly. He replaced Kosie Pretorius. Viljoen had initially been placed 4th on MAG's party list. Viljoen and his party generally support White Namibians, claiming that reverse racism is common in independent Namibia. In the 2009 elections, Viljoen and MAG did not receive enough votes to earn a seat in the National Assembly for the 5th National Assembly from 2010 to 2015.

== Personal ==
Viljoen married Rita Viljoen in 1967 and the couple has four daughters and twelve grandchildren.
