= NMDC =

NMDC may refer to:

- Namibia Movement for Democratic Change, a political party in Namibia
- National Mineral Development Corporation, a state-controlled mineral producer of the Government of India
- NeoModus Direct Connect, a Direct Connect file-sharing client for Windows and Mac users that provided file-sharing capabilities for any type of file within a hub-centric, peer-to-peer network, operated 2000–2005
- New Mexico Digital Collections, a digital humanities portal operated by the University of New Mexico
