= Arnold Tjihuiko =

Namibian politician

Arnold Tjihuiko (born 1 January 1952 in Windhoek) is a Namibian politician. A member of the National Unity Democratic Organisation, Tjihuko has been a member of the National Assembly since 2005. He played an important role in the South West Africa National Union (SWANU) from 1974 to 1995. Prior to joining the National Assembly, he was a top civil servant in the Ministry of Trade and Industry.

== Education ==
Tjihuko earned a master's degree in 1987 from the University of Strathclyde in Glasgow, Scotland.
