= Mike Kavekotora =

Namibian politician

Mike Kamboto Ratoveni Kavekotora (born 16 October 1956 in Ombazu, Kunene Region) is a Namibian politician and member of parliament. He is the president of the Rally for Democracy and Progress (RDP), an opposition party.

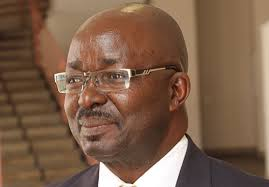
Mike Kavekotora

== Education and career ==
Kavekotora obtained a Masters of Arts in developmental economics from Long Island University in New York, United States and a BSc degree in accounting from Mercy College, also in New York. He returned to Namibia in 1986 upon completing his studies. Kavekotora worked as teacher at Opuwo Secondary School from 1976 to 1978 in the Kunene Region. He joined the private sector and was engaged as a consultant at the Institute for Management and Leadership Training, for the focus area in small business development, from 1986 to 1996.

For the subsequent four years (i.e. 1996–2000), Kavekotora was in the semi-state sector where he was employed as general manager, responsible for business development and marketing at Telecom Namibia. From 2000 to 2005 he was the chief executive officer of the National Housing Enterprise (NHE), and until 2008 he was acting CEO and GM for marketing of TransNamib.

At the RDP’s second Ordinary National Convention, Kavekotora offered his candidacy for the position of the secretary-general in November 2013. He was elected at that congress and after the 2014 general election became a member of parliament.

Kavekotora is the chairman of the Public Account Committee, and as such the only opposition party member chairing a parliamentary standing committee. In 2019 Kavekotora was elected as president of the RDP. Hon. Kavekotora's legislative and professional interests cover the areas of economics, finance, housing issues, agriculture and natural resources. For the 2019 Namibian general election he is the presidential candidate of the RDP and their coalition partner, the Christian Democratic Voice (CDV).
