= Kosie Pretorius =

Namibian politician

- Born: Jacobus Willem Francois Pretorius; 5 September 1935; Swakopmund, Erongo Region, South-West Africa (today Namibia)
- Died: 14 July 2017 (aged 81); Walvis Bay, Erongo Region, Namibia
- Education: University of the Free State
- Occupation: Politician
- Known for: Chairman of the Monitor Action Group party

Jacobus Willem Francois Pretorius, commonly known as Kosie Pretorius (5 September 1935 – 14 July 2017), was a Namibian politician. He was the Chairman of the Monitor Action Group party, which mainly represents conservative white Namibians, and was a member of the National Assembly of Namibia from 1990 to 2005.

== Early life and education ==
Pretorius was born in Swakopmund, Erongo Region. He earned his B.A. and M.A. from what was then the University of the Orange Free State in Bloemfontein, South Africa now known as the University of the Free State in 1956 and 1959, respectively. While there, he was an organising secretary of the Afrikaner Student Union.

== Pre-independence ==
Pretorius was a member of the all-white Legislative Assembly of South West Africa for Gobabis from 1962 to 1989. From 1981 until the founding of Action Christian National (ACN) party in 1989, Pretorius was the leader of the National Party of South West Africa in what was then South West Africa, an extension of the then ruling party of South Africa. He was also Minister of Water Affairs, and Post and Telecommunications in the Transitional Government of National Unity from 1988 to 1989. Immediately prior to independence, he was an ACN member of the Constituent Assembly, which was in place from November 1989 to March 1990.

== Post-independence ==
Following independence in March 1990, Pretorius was a member of the National Assembly from 1990 to 2005. He initially represented the ACN in the National Assembly, but became the chairman of a new party, Monitor Action Group (MAG), in 1991. He was subsequently the only member of MAG in the National Assembly. Pretorius was the MAG candidate in the November 2004 presidential election, in which he received 1.15% of the national vote, finishing last out of seven candidates.

MAG announced on 2 December 2004 that Pretorius would leave the National Assembly in March 2005 and be replaced by Jurie Viljoen. Pretorius said that he would advise Viljoen and would remain the Chairman of MAG. According to Pretorius, this decision was difficult, but he felt it was necessary to train someone younger to represent the party in the National Assembly, and because the party held only one seat he had to step aside to make this possible.

He penned a regular column in the Windhoek Observer called "Parliamentary Potholes".

== Death ==
Pretorius died on the morning of 14 July 2017 at Walvis Bay, where he has lived since retiring from active politics. He is survived by his wife, his four children, eight grandchildren and two great-grandchildren.
