= Notemba Tjipueja =

South African-born Namibian lawyer and politician (born 1958)

Chairwoman of the Electoral Commission of Namibia
- In office 2000–2005
- President: Sam Nujoma
- In office 2007 – August 2011
- Incumbent
- Assumed office 2015

Personal details
- Born: December 1958 (age 67) Johannesburg, South Africa
- Education: University of Papua New Guinea (1977–1980); University of the Witwatersrand (1988–1990)
- Occupation: Lawyer, advocate, politician

Notemba Tjipueja (born December 1958) is a South African-born Namibian lawyer, advocate, and politician who was the chairwoman for the Electoral Commission of Namibia (ECN).

== Biography ==
Tjipieja was born in December 1958, in Johannesburg. She attended the University of Papua New Guinea between 1977 and 1980, then attended the University of the Witwatersrand in between 1988 and 1990. She worked as an advocate and lawyer before she worked in government.

In 2000, Tjipieja was appointed by president Sam Nujoma as chairwoman of the Electoral Commission of Namibia. She served as chairwoman until 2005, before being reappointed as part-time chairwoman by Hifikepunye Pohamba in 2007; she left the office in August 2011. Since 2015, she has been full-time chairwoman of the ECN.
