= Windhoek College of Education =

University in Windhoek, Namibia

Coordinates: 22.5479°S 17.0551°E

The Windhoek College of Education (now known as the University of Namibia Khomasdal campus) is a public university in Khomasdal, Windhoek, Namibia. It opened in 1978 and is one of four national colleges of education in the country.

== Notable alumni ==
- Christine ǁHoebes, minister of presidential affairs
- Elma Dienda
- Michael Goreseb
- Emma Tuahepa
