= Christine ǁHoebes =

Namibian politician

Honourable Christine ǁHoebes

Senior Presidential Advisor
- Incumbent
- Assumed office 2025
- President: Netumbo Nandi-Ndaitwah
- Prime Minister: Elijah Ngurare

Minister in the Presidency
- In office 21 March 2020 – 21 March 2025
- President: Hage Geingob
- Prime Minister: Saara Kuugongelwa-Amadhila
- Preceded by: Martin Andjaba

Deputy Minister of Foreign Affairs
- In office 8 February 2018 – 21 March 2020
- President: Hage Geingob
- Prime Minister: Saara Kuugongelwa-Amadhila
- Preceded by: Peya Mushelenga
- Succeeded by: Jennely Matundu

Deputy Minister in the Presidency
- In office 21 March 2015 – 8 February 2018
- President: Hage Geingob
- Prime Minister: Saara Kuugongelwa-Amadhila
- Preceded by: position established
- Succeeded by: position destablished

Personal details
- Born: Okombahe, Erongo Region
- Party: SWAPO
- Education: Windhoek College of Education
- Occupation: Politician
- Profession: Teacher

Christine ǁHoebes is a Namibian politician who has recently being appointed as the Namibia's High Commissioner to Malaysia, she previously served as the Senior Presidential advisor in the Namibian Presidency from May 2025.

== Early life and education ==
ǁHoebes was born in Okombahe but grew up in Witvlei. She attended school in Witvlei, Gobabis and Windhoek, and then completed a Basic Education Teacher Diploma at the Windhoek College of Education in 2001. She currently pursues distance education degrees at the University of South Africa and the University of Namibia.

== Political career ==
ǁHoebes entered politics at the age of 23 when she became councillor of Witvlei. She was elected chairperson of the village council and was at that time the youngest mayor in Namibia.

ǁHoebes entered cabinet in 2015 as deputy of the minister of presidential affairs. In a cabinet reshuffle in February 2018 ǁHoebes was moved from presidential affairs to foreign affairs, again as deputy minister. On 21 March 2020- 21 March 2025 she was appointed minister of presidential affairs.
