= Fenni Nanyeni =

Namibian politician and member of parliament

Member of the National Assembly of Namibia
- Incumbent
- Assumed office 20 March 2020

Personal details
- Born: 6 October 1969 (age 56) Okaku, Oshana Region
- Party: SWAPO

Fenni Nanyeni (born 6 October 1969) is a Namibian politician from SWAPO. She has been a member of the Parliament of Namibia since 2020.

Her brother Heskiel "Spotsman" Nanyeni was mayor of Omuthiya.

== See also ==
- List of members of the 7th National Assembly of Namibia
- List of members of the 8th National Assembly of Namibia
