= Josef Kauandenge =

Namibian politician

Josef Kauandenge (born 7 October 1974 in Windhoek) is a Namibian politician, musician and legislator in the Parliament of Namibia as member of the National Assembly. He is currently serving as secretary general of National Unity Democratic Organisation (NUDO).

== Education ==
Kauandenge obtained a B-Juris degree from University of South Africa, a diploma in political concepts form University of Napoli Federico II, a diploma in paralegal study from University of Cape Town and a diploma in public relations practice from PRiSA.

== Professional and political life ==
Before joining politics, Kauandenge served as managing director of the Extra Mile Printing Works. He was a public relation manager at Country Club Hotel. In his political career he formed a political party known as Namibia Movement for Independent Candidates (NMIC) between 1997 and 1998. In 2003-2004 he served as a secretary general of NUDO and as Democratic Turnhalle Alliance (DTA) Youth League secretary general from 1998 to 2003. In 2007 he briefly served as secretary general for Namibia Democratic Movement for Change (NDMC). In 2015-2019 Kauandenge was elected as councilor of City of Windhoek. Currently he is serving as member of parliament from 2020 to 2025.

== Music career ==
Kauandenge is also an oviritje musician with the stage name Jossie Kauadenge. His music career rose to another level in 2005 when he released the first albulm titled Mbakotoka (Otjiherero: I am back). He retired from music industry in 2019 to focus on politics.

== Personal life ==
Kauandenge is married to Meisie Henguva Kauandenge, among his children includes Pena Kauandenge and Mbemuundja Kauandenge.
