= Jennely Matundu =

Namibian politician (born 1981)

The Honourable Jennely Matundu

Deputy Minister of International Relation and Trades
- Incumbent
- Assumed office 22 March 2025
- President: Netumbo Nandi-Ndaitwah
- Prime Minister: Elijah Ngurare

Deputy Minister of International Relations and Cooperations
- Incumbent
- Assumed office 2025

Member of the National Assembly of Namibia
- Incumbent
- Assumed office 2020

Personal details
- Born: November 24, 1981 (age 44) Otjerunda

Jennely Matundu (24 November 1981 at Otjerunda, Opuwo in Kunene Region) is a Namibian politician holding the incumbent position of Deputy Minister of International Relations and Trade, as well as Deputy Minister of International Relations and Cooperations since 2025. She is also currently serving her second parliamentary term on the 8th National Assembly of Namibia after previously serving on the 7th National Assembly. Matundu has made advancements in expanding Namibia's Foreign Policy and Management through Namibia's bilateral, regional, and international relations; notably between Namibia and Egypt, India, Sweden, Germany, and the EU. Matundu has shown support for the Sahwari people of the Western Sahara and the Palestinian people of Palestine in their efforts for sovereignty.

== Early life and education ==
Matundu was born on the 24th of November in 1981 at Otjerunda, Opuwo, specifically the Kunene Region.

Matundu matriculated from Gobs Secondary School where she obtained her International General Certificate of Secondary Education in 1998. Matundu holds an Honours Bachelor and National Diploma in Human Resources Management from the Department of Governance and Management Sciences at Namibia University of Science and Technology. Matundu further holds certificates in International Relations and Computer Science.

== Career History ==
Matundu served as a Computer Instructor, then Relief Teacher for English and Otjiherero at the Putuavanga Secondary School from 1999 to 2000. Matundu served first as a Clerical Assistant, then an Examination Clerk participating in examination data management for the Ministry of Education, Innovation, Youth, Sport, Arts and Culture (MEIYSAC), formerly known as the "Ministry of Basic Education, Sports, and Culture" from the years 2002 to 2004 and 2004 to 2010, respectively. Matundu then became the Supervisor of Registration and Returning Office for Presidential, Regional, Local Authoritative, and National Assembly for the Electoral Commission of Namibia, alongside the position of Chief Clerk for the Ministry of Gender Equality, Poverty Eradication and Social Welfare (MGEPESW) from the years 2010 to 2011 and 2010 to 2012, respectively. Matundu then served as the MGEPESW Chief Community Liaison Officer from 2010 to 2019.

Matundu serves to expand Namibia's Foreign Policy and Management through Namibia's regional and international relations. Matundu seeks to protect the interests of the Republic of Namibia, improve the living conditions of Namibians, perform fast implementation of reviewed laws, policies, and regulations, as well as advocate for Gender Mainstreaming.

Matundu reaffirms Namibia's commitment to expanding international standards and technical regulations under the African Continental Free Trade Area (AfCFTA) to build a more integrated and competitive African Continental Technical Regulatory Framework (ACTReF) via bridging policy, trade, and sustainable development.

Matundu acknowledges Namibia's susceptibility to climate disaster due to human activity, accompanied by threats of tectonic and climatic processes. Matundu cosigns a shift in focus from investments regarding disaster response to emergency preparedness.

Matundu strengthened international relations with the EU based on shared objectives to accelerate sustainable green growth, with the EU supporting Namibia's Green Hydrogen Project and Waste Buy Back Centre. Namibia and the EU proposed collaboration to establish the EU-Namibia Early Childhood Development Sector Reform programme.

Matundu, via incumbent National Assembly position, assisted in the 2021 Joint Declaration by the Federal Republic of Germany and the Republic of Namibia, where Germany and Namibia collectively proclaimed an initiative towards unity based on shared memories of Germany's colonial history, shared desires to reconcile, and shared visions of the future through utilizing contemporary semantic and legislative structures.

Matundu strengthened pre-existing relations with Egypt based on historical mutual support regarding each country's respective liberation struggles and a shared support of Palestinian sovereignty. Relations were also strengthened via the shared belief the prosperity of one African country is linked to the prosperity of the entire continent.

Matundu strengthened bilateral relations between Namibia and India based on India's historical support for the Namibian liberation struggle through joining Indian-led multilateral initiatives, including the Global Biofuels Alliance (GBA) and the Coalition for Disaster Resilient Infrastructure.

Matundu strengthened bilateral relations between Namibia and Sweden based on Sweden's historical support for the Namibian liberation struggle and shared objectives of sustainable economic growth, diversification, and climate initiatives to enhance Namibian trade capacity and improve Nambian quality of life.
