= Damara Council =

The Damara Council was a political party in Damaraland, a Bantustan in South West Africa (now Namibia). In 1977, a breakaway faction joined the Democratic Turnhalle Alliance (DTA), while in 1989, the remainder of the DC was one of 8 political parties which formed the United Democratic Front. Six of the 8 parties were ethnically affiliated, as they had taken part in governments of various Bantustans. Since 1989, the UDF has maintained a presence in the National Assembly of Namibia, with Damara-speaking Namibians forming the core of the party.

== Prominent members ==
Prominent members included Frans Migub ǀGoagoseb and Justus ǁGaroëb, both of whom ran other political parties as of the 2009 general election in Namibia.
