= Emma Tuahepa =

Namibian activist

Emma Touny Waundjua Tuhepha

Personal details
- Born: 11 December 1974 (age 51) Caprivi Region
- Occupation: HIV/AIDS Activist

Emma Touny Waundjua Tuhepha (born 11 December 1974) is a Namibian HIV/AIDS activist. In 1996, she was the first Namibian woman to state publicly that she was HIV-positive. She became a high-profile activist for HIV/AIDS awareness and her efforts paid off, as anti-retroviral drugs soon arrived to treat Namibians with HIV/AIDS. In 2001, she co-founded Lironga Eparu (learn to survive), a support group for those living with HIV which also participates in advocacy, awareness raising and policy development. Tuahepa is now the National Coordinator of the Organisation. She is from the Caprivi Region and attended the Caprivi College of Education before earning a Teaching Diploma at the Windhoek College of Education and taught briefly at Okuryangava Primary School.
