= Asser (name) =

Asser is both a surname and a given name. Notable people with the name include:

- Tobias Michael Carel Asser, winner of the Nobel Prize for Peace
- Asser Rig Hvide, Danish nobleman, 1080–1151
- Asser Mbai (born 1950), Namibian politician
- Asser Thorkilsson (1089–1137), Archbishop of Lund
