= Apius Auchab =

Namibian politician

Apius Auchab MP

President of the United Democratic Front
- Incumbent
- Assumed office 1 December 2013
- Preceded by: Justus ǁGaroëb

Member of the National Assembly of Namibia
- Incumbent
- Assumed office 20 March 2015

Personal details
- Born: Apius Auchab; 3 October 1959 (age 66) Omaruru, South West Africa
- Party: United Democratic Front
- Occupation: Member of Parliament
- Profession: Politician

Apius Auchab (born 3 October 1959) is a Namibian politician who has served as the president of the United Democratic Front since 2013. He has been a Member of the National Assembly since 2015. He was previously the party's vice president from 2009 until 2013. Auchab was also the regional councillor for the Dâures Constituency in the Erongo Region until his defeat in 2010.

== Life and career ==
Auchab was born on 3 October 1959 in Omaruru, South West Africa. He worked as a teacher from 1981 until 1990. He was then involved in community activism between 1990 and 1998.

Auchab served as the regional councillor for Dâures, one of only a few constituencies under opposition leadership. In the 2004 regional election he received 1,882 of the 3,445 votes cast. He was defeated by the SWAPO candidate in the 2010 local and regional elections. From 2009 until 2013, he served as vice president of the United Democratic Front.

Long-serving UDF president Justus ǁGaroëb announced his retirement in 2013. Auchab was elected as his successor in December 2013 after he received 214 out of 311 votes. After the 2014 general election, he became a member of the National Assembly. During his first term, he served on the economy and public administration, constitution and law, and natural resources standing committees.

He was his party's presidential candidate in the 2019 general election. He received more than 22,000 votes and came in fifth. Auchab was sworn in for his second term as an MP on 20 March 2020.

== Views ==
Auchab is opposed to abortion. He supports land reform, saying that access to land is a "birthright".
