= Clara Gowases =

Namibian politician (1960–2020)

- Born: 1960
- Died: 13 June 2020 (aged 59–60); Windhoek, Namibia
- Citizenship: Namibian
- Occupations: Teacher, Politician
- Political party: Republican Party

Clara Gowases (1960-2020) was a Namibian teacher and politician. Gowases was elected the chairperson of the Republican Party in September 2009 and subsequently listed second on the party's electoral list for the 2009 general election. Gowases missed out on being elected to the National Assembly as the party only won a single seat. In the February 2010 regional elections, Gowases ran to represent Windhoek Rural in the Regional Council of Khomas Region and was narrowly defeated by SWAPO's Frederick Arie. In March 2011, party president and National Assembly member Henk Mudge resigned and Gowases replaced him in both posts. She was a teacher by profession.

In her inaugural speech to the National Assembly, Gowases criticised the SWAPO-led government for allegedly favouring construction firms from China over neighbouring South African firms. She also criticised government-affiliated trade unions for not criticising Chinese firms for abuses.

Gowases died of cancer in Windhoek on 13 June 2020.
