= Hansina Christiaan =

Namibian politician

Hansina Christiaan is a Namibian politician. A member of SWAPO, Christiaan was a member of the 4th National Assembly of Namibia from 2005 to 2010.
