= Itah Kandji-Murangi =

Namibian politician

Honourable Itah Kandji-Murangi
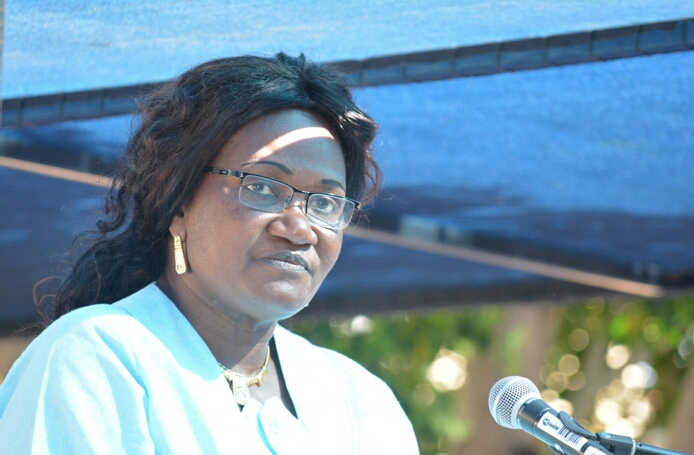

Minister of Higher Education, Training and Innovation
- In office 21 March 2015 – 21 March 2025
- President: Hage Geingob
- Prime Minister: Saara Kuugongelwa-Amadhila
- Preceded by: position established

Itah Kandji-Murangi is a Namibian politician. She served as Namibia's Minister of Higher Education, Training and Innovation from 21 March 2015 to 21 March 2025 .

In 2019 Kandji-Murangi was involved in a power struggle with the Namibia University of Science and Technology Advisory Board over who should take over the position of the founding rector, Tjama Tjivikua. Her interference led to the resignation of Board chairperson Esi Schimming-Chase.
