= James Goodwin =

James Goodwin may refer to:

- James Goodwin (convict) (c. 1800 – after 1835), convict escapee and explorer in Van Diemen's Land, now Tasmania
- James Goodwin (actor) (born 1961), American actor
- D. James Goodwin, American record producer
- James Godwyn (1557–1616), or Goodwin, English politician
- Jim Goodwin (born 1981), Irish footballer
- Jim Goodwin (baseball) (1926–2008), American pitcher in Major League Baseball

== See also ==
- James Godwin, United States Navy admiral
