= Modestus Amutse =

Namibian politician

Minister of Industries, Mines and Energy
- Incumbent
- Assumed office 02 December 2025
- President: Netumbo Nandi-Ndaitwah
- Prime Minister: Elijah Ngurare
- Preceded by: Tom Alweendo

Personal details
- Born: July 22, 1967 (age 58)

Modestus Tshitumbe Amutse (born 22 July 1967 in Oshikuku, Omusati Region) is a Namibian politician, Currently serving as Minister of Industries, Mines and Energy as of 2 December 2025. He previously served as a Deputy Minister of Information, Communication and Technology from 9 February 2024 to 21 March 2025.

== Career ==
Before becoming a politician, Amutse served as a freelance journalist at the Namibia Broadcasting Corporation (NBC). He also served as an Oshikuku Constituency Councilor for 10 years and Chairperson of Omusati Regional Council (2015 – 2020) respectively. His leadership extended nationally as Chairperson of the National Trust Fund (2018-2019). Prior becoming the Deputy Minister of Information and Communication Technology, Amutse is serving as a Member of the National Assembly (2020-2025).

== Interests ==
His legislative interests lies in information communication technology and how it enhance governance.

Amutse is also the author of the book titled: Omithitu nomakuya ga ka nale.

== Education ==
Amutse's qualifications range from MBA-ESAMI- 2016; FCIS-ICCSA- 2006; Public Governance (Hons) -2018- ICSA; MA in Communication – IUA -2016.
