= United Nama Independence People's Party =

The United Nama Independence People's Party was a short-lived political party in Namibia. It was founded in August 1964 on the basis of the Independence and National Convention Party. The party ceased to function in early 1965.
