= 2009 Namibian general election =

- 27–28 November 2009
- Presidential election
- Turnout: 68.73%
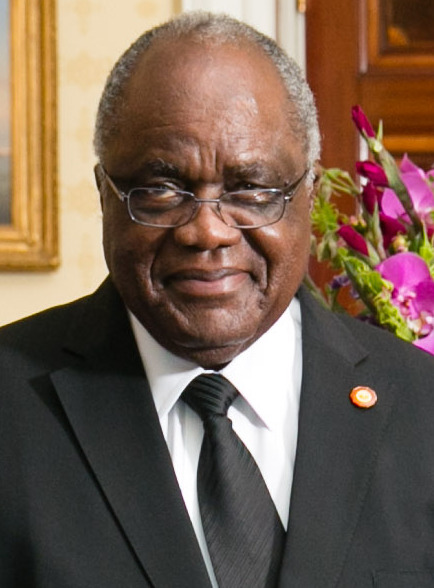
		RDP
Nominee	Hifikepunye Pohamba	Hidipo Hamutenya
Party	SWAPO	RDP
Popular vote	611,241	88,640
Percentage	76.42%	11.08%
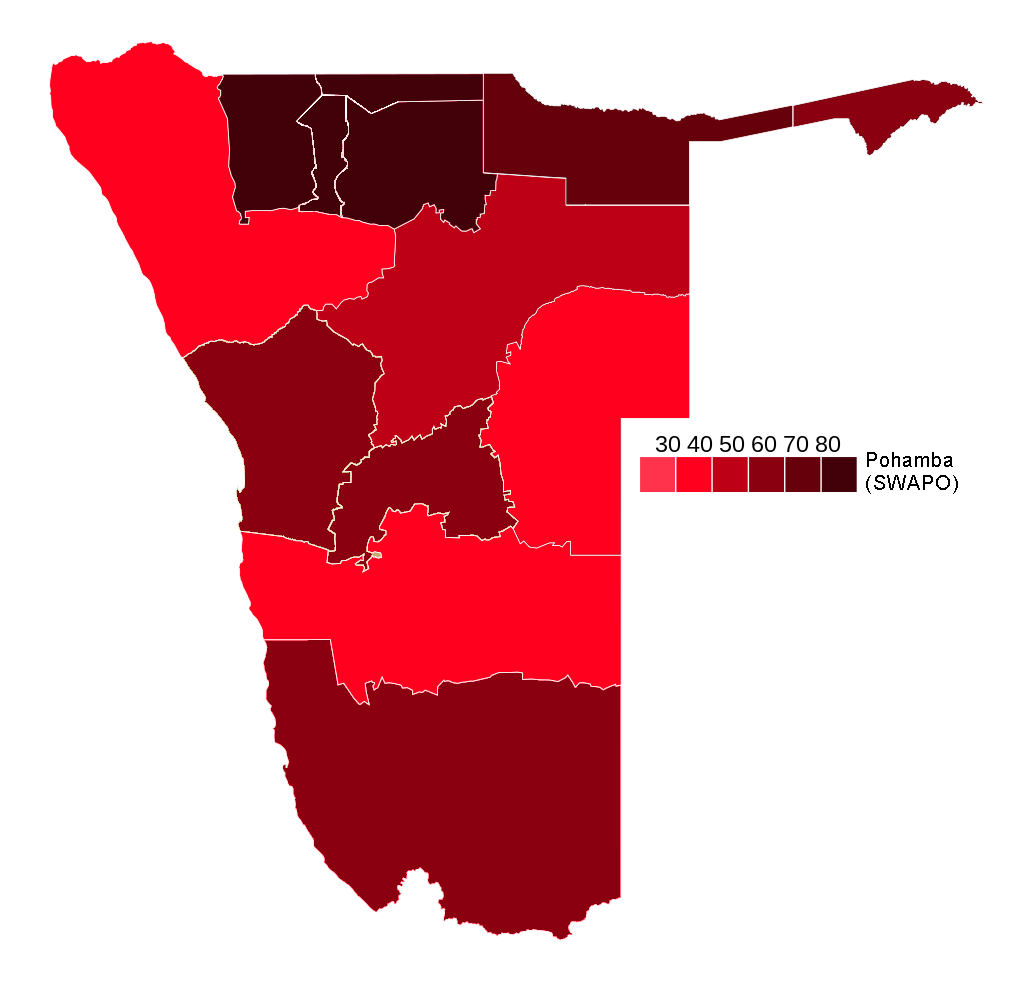
- Results by region
President before election
Hifikepunye Pohamba
SWAPO
Elected President
Hifikepunye Pohamba
SWAPO

General elections were held in Namibia on 27–28 November 2009. These were the fourth general elections since independence and the fifth democratic elections. Voting ended on 28 November and official election results, released on 4 December, showed that Hifikepunye Pohamba and his SWAPO party were re-elected, each with over 75% of the vote. Prior to the election, the South West Africa People's Organization (SWAPO) was widely expected to score a landslide victory, with the Rally for Democracy and Progress (RDP) considered SWAPO's biggest challenger. Fourteen political parties competed for seats in the National Assembly of Namibia, and twelve candidates ran for the presidency.

== Parties ==
=== SWAPO ===
The ruling SWAPO set itself the goal of winning all 72 seats in the National Assembly and controlling the NA "until the second coming of Jesus Christ". At the SWAPO party congress in November 2007, the incumbent president Hifikepunye Pohamba was elected president of SWAPO and also received the party's nomination for president in 2009. SWAPO ended up winning 54 seats, a one-seat loss compared to its strength in the third National Assembly.

=== RDP ===
This was the first general election for the Rally for Democracy and Progress. The party's nominee for president was Hidipo Hamutenya, a former government minister of SWAPO. The RDP was considered the main opposition to the ruling SWAPO. It gained eight seats in the National Assembly and became the Official Opposition.

=== NUDO ===
On 16 October 2009, the National Unity Democratic Organisation (NUDO) was the first political party to officially submit their candidate, Kuaima Riruako, for president.

== Observers ==
The National Society for Human Rights' observer status was withdrawn by the Electoral Commission of Namibia, which said it was "not impartial". The organisation said it would approach the High Court to contest the decision; the court later ordered the commission to restore the organisation's observer status.

== Procedure ==
Though the country planned to buy electronic voting machines from India sometime in 2009, the Electoral Commission assured the National Assembly that they would not be used in the 2009 elections.

== Results ==
=== President ===
Hifikepunye Pohamba was re-elected as President of Namibia with 611,241 votes, more than six times as many as Hamutenya, his nearest rival, received.

Candidate	Party	Votes	%
Hifikepunye Pohamba	SWAPO	611,241	76.42
Hidipo Hamutenya	Rally for Democracy and Progress	88,640	11.08
Katuutire Kaura	Democratic Turnhalle Alliance	24,186	3.02
Kuaima Riruako	National Unity Democratic Organisation	23,735	2.97
Justus ǁGaroëb	United Democratic Front	19,258	2.41
Ignatius Shixwameni	All People's Party	9,981	1.25
Henry Mudge	Republican Party	9,425	1.18
Benjamin Ulenga	Congress of Democrats	5,812	0.73
Usutuaije Maamberua	SWANU	2,968	0.37
David Isaacs	Democratic Party of Namibia	1,859	0.23
Frans Goagoseb	Namibian Democratic Movement for Change	1,760	0.22
Attie Beukes	Communist Party of Namibia	1,005	0.13
Total		799,870	100.00
Valid votes		799,870	98.48
Invalid/blank votes		12,363	1.52
Total votes		812,233	100.00
Registered voters/turnout		1,181,802	68.73
Source: ECN

=== National Assembly ===
Party	Votes	%	Seats	+/–
SWAPO	602,580	75.27	54	–1
Rally for Democracy and Progress	90,556	11.31	8	New
Democratic Turnhalle Alliance	25,393	3.17	2	–2
National Unity Democratic Organisation	24,422	3.05	2	–1
United Democratic Front	19,489	2.43	2	–1
All People's Party	10,795	1.35	1	New
Republican Party	6,541	0.82	1	0
Congress of Democrats	5,375	0.67	1	–4
SWANU	4,989	0.62	1	+1
Monitor Action Group	4,718	0.59	0	–1
Democratic Party of Namibia	1,942	0.24	0	New
Namibian Democratic Movement for Change	1,770	0.22	0	0
National Democratic Party	1,187	0.15	0	New
Communist Party of Namibia	810	0.10	0	New
Appointed members			6	0
Total	800,567	100.00	78	0
Valid votes	800,567	98.70		
Invalid/blank votes	10,576	1.30		
Total votes	811,143	100.00		
Registered voters/turnout	1,181,802	68.64		
Source: ECN

==== By region ====
Region	APP	CP	CoD	DPN	DTA	MAG	NMDC	NDP	NUDO	RDP	RP	SWANU	SWAPO	UDF
Caprivi	105	20	263	43	502	17	24	150	107	5,489	317	97	16,076	59
Erongo	371	29	512	96	1,337	861	87	88	2,193	9,634	876	369	40,057	6,301
Hardap	226	111	633	362	2,900	698	316	99	170	5,298	684	164	10,154	310
ǁKaras	471	79	570	746	1,789	394	65	122	318	6,970	537	255	20,345	184
Kavango	7,110	99	250	88	2,390	51	53	154	224	2,638	412	332	47,798	200
Khomas	1,138	120	1,311	235	3,775	1,447	277	177	5,458	27,461	1,812	1,016	81,336	3,398
Kunene	68	41	233	62	5,858	221	60	41	2,041	2,416	186	133	11,589	5,612
Ohangwena	34	19	140	11	88	11	23	33	55	7,967	123	357	92,447	65
Omaheke	204	51	218	87	2,141	431	653	72	5,398	3,126	582	1,016	11,603	763
Omusati	38	18	149	26	156	16	34	46	511	1,584	64	313	100,890	76
Oshana	103	125	268	28	581	29	30	39	161	6,483	96	228	75,271	86
Oshikoto	247	28	327	27	338	164	30	56	241	3,587	165	264	67,100	524
Otjozondjupa	677	63	488	130	3,518	669	117	119	7,522	7,725	669	451	26,794	1,906
Source: The Namibian

=== Delay controversy ===
Final results were announced on 4 December, the longest delay between voting and the publication of results of any Namibian election (6 days). The Electoral Commission of Namibia (ECN) blamed the delay on a recent amendment to the Electoral Act which had caused "logistical nightmares [they had] never experienced before" and a "cumbersome" verification process. The ECN had received criticism from political parties, civil societies and the general public for the delay. Following publication of the results, 8 of the 13 opposition parties stated that they did not accept the results and were instructing their lawyers to challenge the ECN in court "for contravening the electoral law of the country". Electoral observers have pronounced the polls to be free and fair but recommended that the ECN speed up the counting process and free up access to the media for all parties.

=== Accuracy controversy ===
The accuracy of the results of this election has been questioned, not only by the defeated opposition parties but also by the Namibian Society of Human Rights (NSHR). The voters roll was the main subject of contention, having contained 1 181 835 entries at the time of first publication six weeks prior to the election but shrinking to 820 305 entries within a matter of days. Also the voter turnout has been questioned as there were a number of constituencies that had a turnout of over 100%, on top of the list Windhoek East with 191%, Okatyali with 189%, and Ohangwena with 175%. Further "minor" concerns were people being allowed to vote on behalf of someone else, voters asked to disclose their political affiliation at polling stations, and people allowed to vote twice.
