= Hiskia Ndjoze-Uanivi =

Namibian pastor, politician and activist (born 1946)

Hiskia Ndjoze-Uanivi (born 1946), known under the nom de guerre Rirua Karihangana during the anti-Apartheid struggle, is a Namibian pastor, former politician and anti-Apartheid activist. He was active in student activism against South African rule in Namibia, and as a pastor he was active in the SWAPO movement. In 1979 he was ousted from the SWAPO Central Committee and he spent a decade in exile. Since returning to Namibia in 1989 he has led his own religious group.

== Youth and student activism ==
Uanivi was born in Mbanderuland on 28 October 1946. At age 11 he became a youth commander of the Green Flag (Otjingirine). He went to Rietquelle Higher Primary school in Aminuis between 1957 and 1965, reading up to sixth standard. During his Rietquelle school years he became a member of a joint Green Flag-Red Flag youth group. In 1966-1967 he studied seventh standard at Augustineum High School in Okahandja, where he joined the SWAPO Youth League. In 1968 he studied eight standard at Augustineum High School in Windhoek, but was expelled along with seven other prefects for having authored a petition and was accused of disseminating communist ideas among the students. He studied up to tenth standard through correspondence, and his exams were refused.

Uanivi studied at Paulieum Theological Seminary 1969-1972, obtaining a diploma in Theology. He was the first chairman of the Paulineum Theological Seminary Students Representation Council, and played a key role in organizing the 1971 open letter of Namibian churches to the South African Prime Minister John Vorster. He became attached to the Windhoek parish of the Evangelical Lutheran Church. SWAPO leader Axel Johannes instructed Uanivi and Jerry Ekandjo to travel to Walvis Bay to organize workers ahead of the 1971-1972 general strike. As a pastor he undertook social work in Katutura and organized a protest in 1972 to hand over a petition to the United Nations Secretary-General Kurt Waldheim. Following the protest he was arrested and interrogated. He represented SWAPO in the 1972 National Convention, having been nominated by Aaron Muchimba. In 1972 he traveled to Kenya, where he attended a radio evangelism course. Upon returning to his home country, he was again arrested and held for two days.

== From SWAPO leader to dissident in exile ==
As of 1974 Uanivi served at the Otjiwarongo parish of the Evangelical-Lutheran Church. He became the vice chairman of the SWAPO Otjiwarongo branch. He would provide food and medical supplies to fighters of the People's Liberation Army of Namibia (PLAN) moving through the area.

Uanivi was arrested in September 1975, being one of many Namibians arrested by the South African authorities following the killing of Chief Fillemon Elifas Shuumbwa. He was tortured in captivity, and was taken to Otavi where he was held in solitary confinement. He was released in late November 1975. After his release, he began working at the Martin Luther High School. He continued to be a SWAPO organizer.

He left Namibia in 1977, traveling through Botswana to go into exile in the Zambian capital Lusaka. In November 1977 he was named SWAPO Chief Representative to Angola, and shifted to Luanda in 1978. In Luanda he was a broadcaster from the Voice of Namibia radio station. Gradually he emerged as a dissenting voice within the SWAPO leadership, and openly criticized different United Nations resolutions. In January 1979 he was removed from the SWAPO Central Committee. He remained in Luanda after being ousted from the SWAPO leadership, and was a keen supporter of Angolan leader Agostinho Neto. In 1981 he founded the Communist Party of Namibia, and he became the general secretary of the party. He returned to Namibia in 1989. In 1989 he took part in the founding of the Socialist Alliance of Namibia (SAN), and became one of the acting secretaries of SAN alongside Werner Mamugwe.

== Bishop ==
As of 1991 Uanivi was the general secretary of the National Christian Council of Namibia (NCCN). In September 2000 Hiskia was the chairman of a break-away group from the Assemblies of God, which sought to register itself as the Assemblies of God Movement in Namibia. The Assemblies of God protested the attempted registration to the Ministry of Trade, writing that Uanivi's church was a 'renegade group'. On 28 June 2006 the High Court of Namibia ordered Uanivi's church to change its name within 14 days, due to the similarity of their name with that of the registered Assemblies of God. As of 2023 Uanivi was the Archdiocese of the Divine Word.

Uanivi was married to Kuraumune, the couple had six children. Uanivi is a traditional historian.
