= United Namibia People's Party =

Former political party in Namibia

- Leader: Hizipo Shikondombole
- Founded: 1980
- Merged into: Namibia National Front (1989)

The United Namibia People's Party was a political party in Namibia. It was formed in 1980, following a split in the SWAPO Democrats when four leaders left. The party leader was Hizipo Shikondombole. The party joined the Namibia National Front in 1989.
