= Monitor Action Group =

Political party in Namibia

- Leader: Gernot Schaaf
- Founded: 1991
- Preceded by: National Party of South West Africa
- Headquarters: Windhoek
- Ideology: Conservatism; Afrikaner minority politics

The Monitor Action Group is a political party in Namibia. The party came into existence as the transformation of the National Party of South West Africa in 1991. Kosie Pretorius became its first chairperson and served until his retirement from active politics in June 2013.

The party is based among conservative Afrikaners, with most of the top leadership having served in the government of apartheid South West Africa. In June 2009, the party contended that aspects of the affirmative action policy of Namibia violated the country's constitution.

== Electoral history ==
At the 15-16 November 2004 parliamentary elections, the party won 0.8% of the popular vote and 1 out of 72 seats. The party was led by Pretorius, though Jurie Viljoen was the party's representative in the National Assembly.

In the 2009 election, the party chose not to name a candidate for president, but competed for seats in the National Assembly of Namibia. However, the party received only 4,718 votes, just below the minimum for a seat in the National Assembly. Ahead of the election, the top four party leaders were Kosie Pretorius, Jurie Viljoen, Gernot Wilfrid Schaaf and Eric Peters.

The party's election results further deteriorated in 2014. It did not contest the 2019 Namibian general election. In the 2020 local authority election it narrowly gained a seat in the Outjo municipality.

=== Presidential elections ===
Election	Party candidate	Votes	%	Result
2004	Kosie Pretorius	9,378	1.15%	Lost ✗

=== National Assembly elections ===
Election	Party leader	Votes	%	Seats	+/–	Position	Result
1994	Kosie Pretorius	4,005	0.8%	1 / 72	▲1	▲5th	Opposition
1999	Kosie Pretorius	3,618	0.67%	1 / 72	Steady	5th	Opposition
2004	Kosie Pretorius	6,950	0.85%	1 / 72	Steady	▼7th	Opposition
2009	Kosie Pretorius	4,718	0.58%	0 / 72	▼1	▼10th	Extra-parliamentary
2014	Gernot Schaaf	3,073	0.34%	0 / 96	Steady	▼13th	Extra-parliamentary
