= United Namib Independence Party =

The United Namib Independence Party was a political party in Namibia. It was founded in 1964 by the Herero Chiefs Council, after the HCC formally severed ties with the South West African National Union (SWANU).
