= List of members of the National Assembly of Serbia, 2007–2008 =

This is a list of the 250 members of the 2007–2008 National Assembly of Serbia, as well as a list of former members of the 2007–2008 National Assembly.

The 2007–2008 National Assembly was elected in the 2007 parliamentary election, and it held its first session on 14 February 2007. The 2007–2008 National Assembly was the 7th assembly since the reestablishment of the multi-party system, after the 1990 parliamentary election.

== MNAs by party ==
Name	Abbr.	Leader	Ideology	Political position	MPs	Gov′t
Serbian Radical Party; Српска радикална странка Srpska radikalna stranka	SRS	Tomislav Nikolić	Serbian nationalism Right-wing populism	Right-wing to far-right	81 / 250	O
Democratic Party; Демократска странка Demokratska stranka	DS	Boris Tadić	Social democracy Social liberalism	Centre to centre-left	60 / 250	G
Democratic Party of Serbia; Демократска странка Србије; Demokratska stranka Srbije	DSS	Vojislav Koštunica	National conservatism Christian democracy	Centre-right	33 / 250	G
G17 Plus; Г17 Плус; G17 Plus	G17+	Miroljub Labus	Liberal conservatism Pro-Europeanism	Centre to centre-right	19 / 250	G
Socialist Party of Serbia; Социјалистичка партија Србије; Socijalistička partija Srbije	SPS	Ivica Dačić	Democratic socialism Left-wing populism	Centre-left to left-wing	16 / 250	O
New Serbia; Нова Србија; Nova Srbija	NS	Velimir Ilić	Right-wing populism Monarchism	Right-wing	10 / 250	G
Liberal Democratic Party; Либерално демократска партија Liberalno demokratska partija	LDP	Čedomir Jovanović	Liberalism; Atlanticism	Centre	9 / 250	O
League of Social Democrats of Vojvodina; Лига социјалдемократа Војводине; Liga socijaldemokrata Vojvodine	LSV	Nenad Čanak	Social democracy Regionalism	Centre-left	5 / 250	O
Alliance of Vojvodina Hungarians; Савез војвођанских Мађара; Savez vojvođanskih Mađara	SVM	István Pásztor	Hungarian minority politics Conservatism	Centre-right	3 / 250	S
United Serbia; Јединствена Србија; Jedinstvena Srbija	JS	Dragan Marković	Serbian nationalism National conservatism	Right-wing	2 / 250	S
Social Democratic Union; Социјалдемократска унија Socijaldemokratska unija	SDU	Žarko Korać	Social democracy Pro-Europeanism	Centre-left	2 / 250	O
Party of Democratic Action of Sandžak; Странка демократске акције Санџака; Stranka demokratske akcije Sandžaka	SDA S	Sulejman Ugljanin	Bosniak minority politics Bosniak nationalism	Right-wing	2 / 250	O
Party for Democratic Action; Партија за демократско деловање Partija za demokratsko delovanje	PDD	Riza Halimi	Albanian minority politics Regionalism	Right-wing	1 / 250	O
