= Esther Muinjangue =

Namibian politician (born 1962)

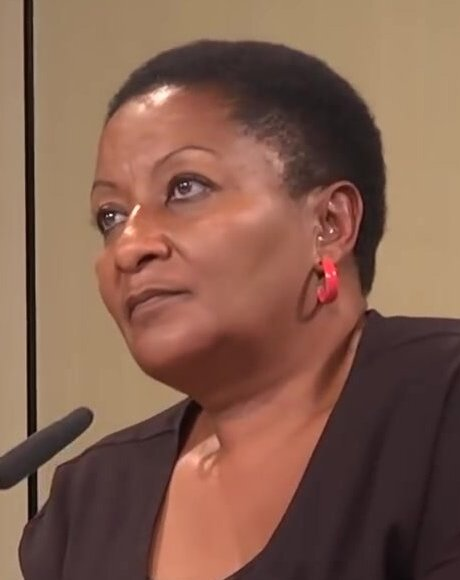

Deputy Minister of Health and Social Services
- In office March 2020 – 21 March 2025
- Preceded by: Juliet Kavetuna

President of National Unity Democratic Organisation
- Incumbent
- Assumed office March 2019
- Preceded by: Asser Mbai

Personal details
- Born: 17 August 1962 (age 64) Windhoek, Namibia
- Party: NUDO
- Education: Academy of Tertiary Education (now University of Namibia) (BA Sci) University of Pretoria (Masters in Social Work) University of Stellenbosch (PhD)

Esther Utjiua Muinjangue (born 17 August 1962) is a Namibian politician and the president of the National Unity Democratic Organisation (NUDO), a party that occupies two seats in the National Assembly of Namibia and one seat in the National Council of Namibia. In addition, she is the first woman to lead a political party in Namibia, and the country's first female presidential candidate. She was appointed as the country's deputy minister of health and social services in March 2020 by Namibian President Hage Geingob. Esther Muinjangue promised to give the leadership to the upcoming new leadership in the party this year (2025).

== Education ==
Muinjangue is a social worker by profession and obtained her BA qualification from the Academy of Tertiary Education (now the University of Namibia).

She further obtained her Masters in Social Work at the University of Pretoria.

Esther was congratulated by her party people (NUDO) for obtaining her PhD.

== 2019 Presidential election ==
In the 2019 Namibian general election, Muinjangue ran as a presidential candidate, but only won 1.5% of the popular vote. However, NUDO won two seats in Parliament, so, as the leader of her party, she will sit in the National Assembly.
