= Public holidays in Namibia =

The following table provides an overview of public holidays in Namibia. These are stipulated in the Public Holidays Act of 1990 (Act 26 of 1990) of the Namibian National Assembly. When a public holiday fall on a Sunday, the following Monday is observed as a public holiday. In addition, the president of Namibia may declare additional public holidays to be observed in specific years.

Date	English name	Comment
1 January	New Year's Day	
21 March	Independence Day	
variable	Good Friday	2 days before Easter Sunday
variable	Easter Monday	1 day after Easter Sunday
1 May	Workers' Day	
4 May	Cassinga Day	
variable	Ascension Day	39 days after Easter Sunday
25 May	Africa Day	
28 May	Genocide Remembrance Day	
26 August	Heroes' Day	
10 December	Human Rights Day	
25 December	Christmas Day	
26 December	Family Day	
