= Elizabeth Becker (politician) =

Namibian politician (born 1969)

Member of the National Assembly of Namibia
- In office 20 March 2020 – 2023

Personal details
- Party: Popular Democratic Movement

Elizabeth Celeste Becker (born 6 October 1969) is a Namibian politician from the Popular Democratic Movement. She was elected a member of the Parliament of Namibia in 2020.

Becker was Secretary General of the United People's Movement.

== See also ==
- List of members of the 7th National Assembly of Namibia
