= Nico Somaeb =

Namibian politician and member of parliament

Member of the National Assembly of Namibia
- Incumbent
- Assumed office 20 March 2025

Personal details
- Born: 1981 (age 44–45) Outjo, Kunene Region
- Party: United Democratic Front

Nico Mauluis Somaeb (born 1981) is a Namibian politician from the United Democratic Front who has been a member of the Parliament of Namibia since 2025. He was elected in the 2024 Namibian general election. He was previously a councillor in Kamanjab Constituency.

== See also ==
- List of members of the 8th National Assembly of Namibia
