= Ministry of Higher Education (Namibia) =

Former Namibian government department

The Ministry of Higher Education was a department of the Namibian government. It was established in 1995 under the name Ministry of Higher Education and Vocational Education as a split-off from the Ministry of Education (MOE) and existed in this form until 2005 when its portfolio fell back to the MOE. In 2015 it was reestablished as Ministry of Higher Education, Training and Innovation (MHETI).

In 2025 the ministry was again disestablished. The portfolios of innovation, as well as higher education were given back to the Ministry of Education, the portfolio of training was discontinued.

The first Namibian higher education minister was Nahas Angula, the last minister was Itah Kandji-Murangi.

== Ministers ==
All higher education ministers in chronological order are:

#	Picture	Name	(Birth–Death)	Party	Term start	Term end
Minister of Higher Education and Vocational Education
1		Nahas Angula	1943–	SWAPO	1995	2005
Minister of Higher Education, Training and Innovation
2		Itah Kandji-Murangi	1957–	SWAPO	2015	2025
