= Democratic Party of Namibia =

Political party in Namibia

The Democratic Party of Namibia is a political party in Namibia, launched in July 2008 at Keetmanshoop.

Although an initiative of the Nama people, the party plans to focus on all ethnic minorities in Namibia. It positions itself in clear opposition to SWAPO, the current ruling party of Namibia. The party's interim president is Salomon Dawid Isaacs.

== Election results ==
The DPN contested the 2009 general election. It finished in eleventh of fourteen parties in voting for the National Assembly of Namibia and did not win a seat. The party's candidate for president, David Isaacs, finished tenth of twelve candidates.

The party won a seat in the 2010 local elections in the Karasburg City Council. In January 2011, the party suspended two members, including an executive committee member, for siding with SWAPO against the directive of the party's central committee during the internal city council elections in Karasburg. Another member had been removed from the council but later re-added after showing remorse.

The party's election results further deteriorated in the 2014 general election where it finished last. It did not contest the 2019 general election.
