= Epafras Mukwiilongo =

Namibian politician and businessman

- Born: 1971 or 1972 (age 53–54)

Jan Epafras M. Mukwiilongo (born 1971 or 1972) is a Namibian politician and businessman. He is the founding leader and self-styled "Commander-in-Chief" of the Namibian Economic Freedom Fighters since its foundation on 24 June 2014.

Mukwiilongo's political journey started with SWAPO. He left and joined the Congress of Democrats (CoD), which was the official opposition at the time, and in 2004 became a member of its executive committee. After his stint at the CoD he re-joined SWAPO.

In 2014 the Namibian Economic Freedom Fighters (NEFF) was founded with Mukwiilongo as leader of the party. The NEFF is known for its left-wing economic views, including calls to nationalise Namibia's vast natural resources, opposition toward Chinese and Indian investors whom the NEFF claim are destroying the Namibian local business, and anti-LGBT social views. In the 2019 general election, Mukwiilongo finished in 11th and last place with 1,026 votes (0.1%) in the presidential election but was elected to the 7th National Assembly as one of two NEFF representatives.

Mukwiilongo owns businesses in Oshakati and Oshikuku. He is the nephew of Leonard Nangolo Mukwiilongo, who was the first governor of the Omusati Region.
