= Henk Mudge =

Namibian politician

Henry Ferdinand Mudge
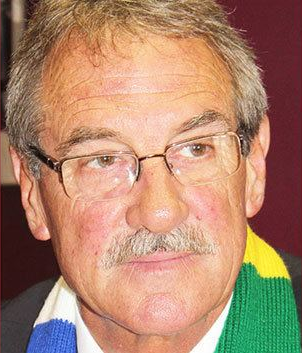

Member of the National Assembly of Namibia
- Incumbent
- Assumed office November 2014
- In office 21 March 2004 – 16 March 2011

President of the Republican Party
- Incumbent
- Assumed office July 2014
- In office 2003 – 16 March 2011

Personal details
- Born: 18 February 1952 (age 74)
- Party: Republican Party
- Parent: Dirk Mudge (father)

Henry Ferdinand "Henk" Mudge (born 18 February 1952) is a Namibian politician and President of the Republican Party. He was the party's only member of the National Assembly of Namibia from 2004 to 2011, when he resigned.

== Life and career ==
Mudge, a White Namibian, was born in Otjiwarongo, Otjozondjupa South West Africa (now Namibia); he was the son of Republican Party founder the late Dirk Mudge. The younger Mudge was a founding member of the Republican Party in 1977; the party joined the Democratic Turnhalle Alliance (DTA) in the same year, and Mudge held a seat on the Khomas Regional Council from 1992 to 2003 as a member of the DTA, representing Windhoek West Constituency. Mid of 2003 Mudge launched an effort to revive the Republican Party as an independent organization, and he resigned from the Regional Council on 30 June 2003. DTA President Katuutire Kaura denounced Mudge's move to separate the Republican Party from the DTA, saying that Mudge acted unilaterally and illegally, and he said that Mudge had "expelled himself" from the DTA through his actions. Kaura claimed that Mudge wanted to create a party solely for "previously advantaged" minority Namibians. Mudge became the President of the Republican Party, as well as a member of its National Executive Committee, in 2003.

In the November 2004 parliamentary election, he was elected to the National Assembly of Namibia; he also stood as the Republican Party's candidate in the presidential election, receiving 1.95% of the vote.

In the summer of 2008, Henk Mudge sharply criticized the activities of the CEO of the national airline Air Namibia, Cosmas Egumbo. In response, Egumbo accused Mudge of racism and pursuing selfish family goals. Henk Mudge responded with a special statement. In his speeches, Henk Mudge condemns the apartheid system and acknowledges that white Namibians enjoyed privileges at the expense of their black fellow citizens. At the same time, he calls on whites to be politically active in modern Namibia, using Republican Party activists as an example. He sharply criticizes the ruling SWAPO for its corruption and pro-Chinese policies.

In the November 2009 parliamentary election, Mudge was re-elected to the National Assembly as the party's only representative. In the concurrent presidential election, Mudge received 1.16% of the vote, placing seventh out of 12 candidates. In September 2010, Mudge and eight other opposition politicians were sworn-in as members of the National Assembly following a six-month boycott due to electoral irregularities in the 2009 election.

In March 2011, Mudge resigned as both a member of the National Assembly and as the President of the Republican Party. The party appointed Clara Gowases, who was ranked second on the party's electoral list in the 2009 election, to replace him. He nevertheless remained in the post of party president. On 9 January 2013 Mudge declared his party's support for Hage Geingob in the 2014 presidential election. Mudge was re-elected as President of the Republican Party at a party congress in July 2014. He was elected to the National Assembly in the November 2014 parliamentary election, again as his party's only representative.

He ran as a presidential candidate in the 2024 Namibian general election.
