= Tangeni Iijambo =

Namibian politician of SWANU party

Tangeni Iijambo (born 24 November 1954) is a Namibian politician and academic. He was president of the South West Africa National Union (SWANU) from 2017 to 2022, and SWANU member of parliament from 2018 to 2023.

Iiyambo ran as presidential candidate in the 2019 Namibian general election. He only gathered 0.7% of the popular vote and occupied the sole seat in parliament that SWANU won. After Evilastus Kaaronda took over the SWANU presidency from him in 2022, the party decided that he should serve out his term in parliament. However, in March 2023 SWANU withdrew Iijambo from parliament and installed Kaaronda.
