= Hilma Nicanor =

Namibian politician and woman activist

Honourable Hilma Nicanor

Deputy Minister of Veteran Affairs
- In office 21 March 2015 – 21 March 2025
- President: Hage Geingob
- Prime Minister: Saara Kuugongelwa-Amadhila
- Preceded by: Nickey Iyambo

Personal details
- Born: 3 May 1956 (age 69) Oshana Region

Hilma Ndinelago Nicanor (born 3 May 1956 in Oshana Region) is a Namibian politician and woman activist. At the age of 18 she joined Swapo and its military wing, the People's Liberation Army of Namibia (PLAN) to contribute to the fight for Namibian independence. In 2004 she became the Councillor of the Keetmanshoop Urban constituency, and one of two representatives of the ǁKaras Region to the National Council of Namibia, the country's upper house. Since 2011 Nicanor is Namibia's Deputy Minister for Veteran Affairs.

Nicanor completed school in 1974 at Martin Luther High in Okombahe, and was further educated in Bulgaria.
