= National Unity Democratic Organisation =

Political party in Namibia

- Abbreviation: NUDO
- President: Esther Muinjangue
- Secretary-General: Joseph Kauandenge
- Vice president: Peter Kazongominja
- Founders: Mburumba Kerina; Clemens Kapuuo; Hosea Kutako
- Founded: September 1965; 60 years ago
- Split from: Popular Democratic Movement (formerly DTA) in 2003
- Headquarters: Windhoek; Khomas Region
- Ideology: Herero minority politics
- Colors: Red; White; Green
- Seats in the National Assembly: 1 / 104
- Seats in the National Council: 1 / 42
- Regional Councillors: 4 / 121
- Local councillors: 11 / 378
- Pan-African Parliament: 1 / 5

The National Unity Democratic Organisation (NUDO) is a political party in Namibia. It has been represented in the National Assembly of Namibia and in the National Council of Namibia since it split from the Democratic Turnhalle Alliance (now PDM) prior to the 2004 general and local elections. The party's president is Esther Muinjangue.

== History ==
NUDO was founded by Mburumba Kerina, Clemens Kapuuo, and Hosea Kutako in September 1965 at the suggestion of the Herero Chiefs' Council. It was thus, at that time, an organisation that had mainly Herero followers. At the 1975-1977 Turnhalle Constitutional Conference, several ethnically based parties agreed to join the Democratic Turnhalle Alliance to form one joint opposition to SWAPO which at that time had turned the struggle for Namibian independence into a guerrilla war.

NUDO remained part of the DTA until it withdrew in September 2003, accusing the DTA of failing to work for Herero interests. The party then held a congress in January 2004.

== Leadership ==
Esther Utjiua Muinjangue became the party’s first elected female president and the first elected female leader of a Namibian political party when she defeated the Okakarara constituency councillor, Vetaruhe Kandorozu, at the party’s third elective congress, which took place on 25–26 March 2019 in Windhoek. Peter Kazongominja was elected vice president and Josef Kauandenge secretary-general of the party. Muinjangue defeated the councillor by 240 to 227 votes.

== Election results ==
=== Presidential elections ===
Election	Candidate	Votes	%	Result
2004	Kuaima Riruako	34,651	4.23%	Lost ✗
2009	Kuaima Riruako	23,735	2.92%	Lost ✗
2014	Asser Mbai	16,740	1.88%	Lost ✗
2019	Esther Muinjangue	12,039	1.5%	Lost ✗
2024	Did not contest			

=== National Assembly elections ===
Election	Party leader	Votes	%	Seats	+/–	Position	Result
2004	Kuaima Riruako	34,814	4.25%	3 / 72	New	▲4th	Opposition
2009	Kuaima Riruako	24,422	3.01%	2 / 72	▼1	4th	Opposition
2014	Asser Mbai	17,942	2.01%	2 / 96	0	▼6th	Opposition
2019	Esther Muinjangue	16,066	1.96%	2 / 96	0	▲4th	Opposition
2024	Esther Muinjangue	10,687	0.98%	1 / 96	▼1	▼10th	Opposition

=== Local elections ===
Election	Seats
2004	09 / 303
2010	09 / 327
2015	11 / 378

In the parliamentary election held on 15 and 16 November 2004, the party won 4.1% of popular vote and three out of 78 seats. Herero Chief Kuaima Riruako, the President of NUDO, was its candidate in the concurrent presidential election, placing fourth with 4.23% of the national vote. Riruako died on 2 June 2014, and was succeeded as NUDO president by Asser Mbai. In the 2014 National Assembly elections NUDO won two seats which went to president Asser Mbai and secretary-general Meundju Jahanika.
