= Asser Mbai =

Namibian politician

Asser Mbai (born 1950 in Otjiwarongo) is a Namibian politician who was the President of the National Unity Democratic Organization (NUDO) from 2014 to 2019. He has been a member of the National Assembly of Namibia since 2005 after succeeding Kuaima Riruako as President of NUDO following the latter's death on 2 June 2014.

== Political career ==
Mbai replaced Mburumba Kerina in the National Assembly following Kerina's fall out with the party over the use of government funds. Prior to his election to the National Assembly, he was a regional councillor for Okakarara.
