= Republican Party (Namibia) =

Political party in Namibia

Republican Party Republikanische Partei
- Abbreviation: RP
- President: Henk Mudge
- Chairperson: Herlinde Tjiveze
- Deputy President: Mathias Sipipa Mbundu
- Secretary General: Elvire Theron
- Senior Advisor: James Goodwin
- Founder: Dirk Mudge
- Founded: 5 October 1977; 48 years ago
- Headquarters: Windhoek; Khomas Region
- Ideology: Social conservatism Christian democracy Anti-corruption; Racial equality Minority rights
- Political position: Right-wing
- Religion: Protestantism
- Colors: Blue; Yellow; White; Green
- Seats in the National Assembly: 1 / 104
- Seats in the National Council: 0 / 42
- Regional Councillors: 0 / 121
- Local Councillors: 2 / 378
- Pan-African Parliament: 0 / 5

Website
- www.rpnamibia.com

The Republican Party (German: Republikanische Partei) is a political party in Namibia. Henk Mudge was its President and its sole representative in the National Assembly. Prior to the 2004 parliamentary election, the Republican Party was part of the Democratic Turnhalle Alliance (DTA). It was revived as an independent party in 2003, and won 1.9% of popular vote and one National Assembly seat.

The Republican Party was founded by Dirk Mudge in 1977 and joined the DTA in the same year. In mid-2003, the Republican Party revived itself as an independent organization. Hardap Region Governor Pieter Boltman resigned as party leader, opposing the party's moves to separate itself from the DTA, in July 2003, and he was succeeded by Henk Mudge, Dirk Mudge's son. DTA President Katuutire Kaura denounced the moves to separate the Republican Party from the DTA, saying that Mudge acted unilaterally and illegally. Kaura claimed that Mudge wanted to create a party solely for "previously advantaged" minority Namibians, but Mudge denied that the Republican Party would be a party exclusively for whites.

Mudge stood as the Republican Party's candidate in the November 2004 presidential election, receiving 1.95% of the vote and placing sixth. Mudge stood again for the Presidency in the 2009 election, where he gained 9,425 votes (1.16%), finishing seventh overall. He was re-elected as the party's leader to the National Assembly.

In September 2010, the Republican Party was reported to have begun the process of merging with the Rally for Democracy and Progress, the country's largest opposition party. Henk Mudge then announced that he would resign from Parliament on 14 October 2010 and confirmed the disbanding of the Republican Party. In the event he did not resign as a National Assembly member and party president until March 2011. Teacher and party chairperson Clara Gowases was appointed in his place and gave her initial speech to the National Assembly in April of that year. According to a later interview with Mudge, some Republican Party members were elected to local councils with RDP support at this time.

The merger plan was apparently revived in 2013 and again early in 2014. During the 2014 presidential election, Mudge initially urged party members to vote for Hage Geingob of SWAPO, before deciding to stand as a candidate. He received 8,676 votes (0.97%) and finished fifth of nine candidates. In the concurrent parliamentary elections, the party received 6,099 votes and one seat. In the 2019 Namibian general election the RP received 14,546 votes and two seats.

== Electoral history ==
=== Presidential elections ===
| Election | Party candidate | Votes | % | Result |
|---|---|---|---|---|
| 2004 | Henk Mudge | 15,955 | 1.95% | Lost ✗ |
| 2009 | Henk Mudge | 9,425 | 1.16% | Lost ✗ |
| 2014 | Henk Mudge | 8,676 | 0.97% | Lost ✗ |
| 2019 | Henk Mudge | 4,379 | 0.5% | Lost ✗ |
| 2024 | Henk Mudge | 8,987 | 0.83% | Lost ✗ |

=== National Assembly elections ===
| Election | Party leader | Votes | % | Seats | +/– | Position | Result |
|---|---|---|---|---|---|---|---|
| 2004 | Henk Mudge | 16,187 | 1.98% | 1 / 72 | New | ▲6th | Opposition |
| 2009 | Henk Mudge | 6,541 | 0.81% | 1 / 72 | 0 | ▼7th | Opposition |
| 2014 | Henk Mudge | 6,099 | 0.68% | 1 / 96 | 0 | ▼10th | Opposition |
| 2019 | Henk Mudge | 14,546 | 1.77% | 2 / 96 | ▲1 | ▲7th | Opposition |
| 2024 | Henk Mudge | 10,942 | 1.00% | 1 / 96 | ▼1 | ▼9th | Opposition |
