= Justus ǁGaroëb =

Namibian traditional ruler and politician

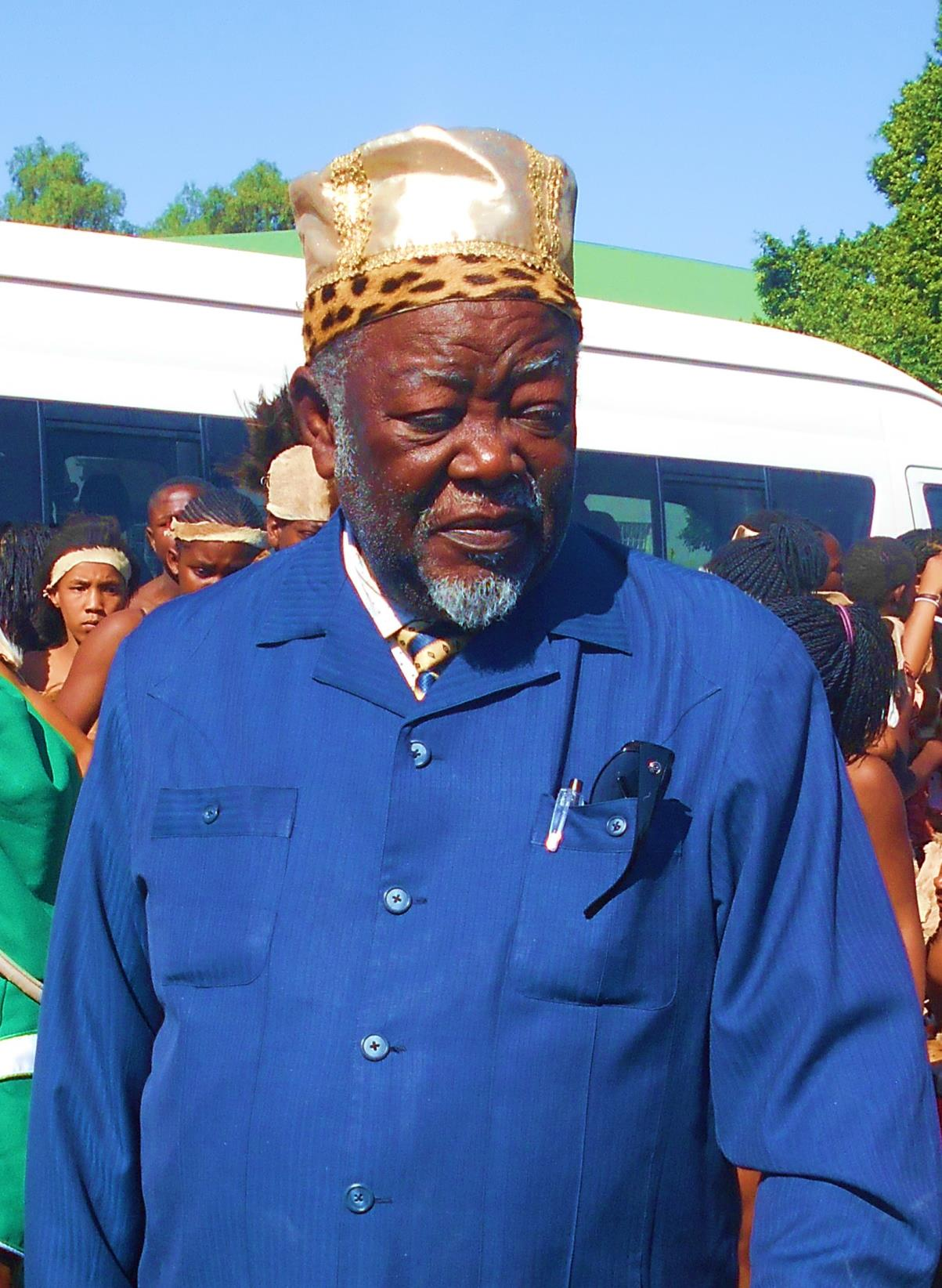
- ǁGaroëb in 2016

Member of the National Assembly
- Incumbent
- Assumed office 1990

Personal details
- Born: Justus ǀUruhe ǁGaroëb Omaruru, South West Africa
- Party: United Democratic Front
- Other political affiliations: Namibia National Front
- Education: Augustineum Training College

Gaob of the Damara
- Reign: 1994 – present (Note: Acting from 1982 to 1994.)
- Predecessor: David ǁGoreseb

Justus ǀUruhe ǁGaroëb (Note: The letter ⟨ǁG⟩ represents a lateral click consonant, like the sound used to spur on a horse. The G is not pronounced in Damara, but the name is pronounced (and often spelled) with only a G in English.) (born 16 December 1942) is a Namibian traditional ruler and politician who is the current Gaob of the Damara people since 1977. He is the longest serving traditional ruler in recorded history, and was previously a supporter of the resistance to apartheid. He is the founder and former leader of the Namibia National Front and the United Democratic Front (UDF).

== Early life and career ==
ǁGaroëb was born on 16 December 1942 in Omaruru (Khoekhoe: ǃGuidiǁgams), in the Erongo Region. He went to school at the Augustineum Training College in Okahandja before studying medicine at the University College of Zululand in South Africa. He did not finish his studies due to family obligations and lack of financial support.

ǁGaroëb became a member of the Damara Advisory Council in 1971, and its chairman in 1977, succeeding chief David ǁGoreseb. When between 1975 and 1977 the Turnhalle Constitutional Conference was held in Windhoek with the aim of developing a constitution for a self-governed Namibia under South African control, ǁGaroëb "refused to take part". Instead he oversaw the Damara Council to merge into the Namibia National Front (NNF), one of the groups opposing the Turnhalle Conference and its results, in 1977. He also became the first president of the NNF.

In 1982, he became paramount chief and acting king of the Damara, and he has been King of the Damara since 1994. In 1989 ǁGaroëb founded the United Democratic Front (UDF). He has been the President of the UDF since that time. Immediately prior to independence, he was a UDF member of the Constituent Assembly, which was in place from November 1989 to March 1990, and he has been a member of the National Assembly since 1990.

He has stood for the presidency on three occasions. In 1999, he placed fourth with 3.02% of the vote, in 2004 he placed fifth with 3.83% of the vote, and in 2009 he placed 5th with 2.37%. In Kunene Region, he received 22.5% of the vote, including winning the most votes in Khorixas Constituency and Sesfontein Constituency.
