= Namibian Economic Freedom Fighters =

Political party in Namibia

- Abbreviation: NEFF
- Leader: Epafras Mukwiilongo
- Founded: June 2014
- Split from: SWAPO
- Ideology: Pan-Africanism; Anti-capitalism; Anti-imperialism; Anti-LGBT; Anti-Chinese; Anti-Indian
- Political position: Far-left
- South African counterpart: Economic Freedom Fighters
- Colours: Red
- Seats in the National Assembly: 1 / 104
- Seats in the National Council: 0 / 42
- Regional Councillors: 0 / 121
- Local Councillors: 0 / 378
- Pan-African Parliament: 0 / 5

The Namibian Economic Freedom Fighters (NEFF) is a political party in Namibia. It was formed in June 2014. The party has close links to the South African Economic Freedom Fighters. Economically, the two parties are similar, with the NEFF describing itself as a pro-freedom, anti-capitalist and anti-imperialist movement, opposed to foreign exploitation of the country's natural resources, and proposing that land and its natural resources be owned by indigenous people.

Led by former SWAPO member Epafras Mukwiilongo, the party differs from its South African relative in its anti-homosexual rhetoric, with Mukwiilongo stating that "Today, the imperialists are manipulating/influencing our nation through homosexual practices. The NEFF is committed to uniting all Namibians to root out this evil practice. Namibia will never be ruled by homosexuals".

The party contested the 2014 general elections. It only received 0.36% of the votes and failed to gain any seats in the National Assembly. Its presidential candidate Mukwilongo came in last of the nine contenders. In the 2019 general election, NEFF won 1.66% of the votes and two seats in parliament, although its presidential candidate Mukwiilongo again finished last.

In June 2024, the Electoral Commission of Namibia deregistered NEEF for allegedly not complying with provisions of the Electoral Act of 2014 as they relate to the submission of financial statements. On 8 August 2024, NEEF challenged the case and lost the fight in Electoral Court of Namibia.

== Electoral history ==
=== Presidential elections ===
Election	Party candidate	Votes	%	Result
2014	Jan Mukwilongo	2,514	0.28%	Lost ✗
2019	Epafras Mukwiilongo	1,026	0.12%	Lost ✗
2024	Epafras Mukwiilongo	3,978	0.36%	Lost ✗

=== National Assembly elections ===
Election	Party leader	Votes	%	Seats	+/–	Result
2014	Epafras Mukwiilongo	3,259	0.36%	0 / 104	New	Extra-parliamentary
2019	Epafras Mukwiilongo	13,580	1.66%	2 / 104	▲2	Opposition
2024	Epafras Mukwiilongo	11,743	1.07%	1 / 104	▼1	Opposition
