= Namibia Democratic Movement for Change =

Defunct political party in Namibia

- Leader: Frans Migub ǀGoagoseb
- Founded: 2003
- Dissolved: 2012
- Headquarters: Windhoek
- Ideology: Christian democracy

The Namibia Democratic Movement for Change (NDMC) was a Namibian political party. It was founded in October 2003 under the umbrella of the Democratic Turnhalle Alliance but left it prior to the 2004 parliamentary election due to an internal power struggle. The party "targeted the rural population in eastern Namibia, but [...] with little success." It contested the 2004 and 2009 parliamentary elections but failed to gain a seat in Parliament on both occasions.

President of the NMDC was Frans Migub ǀGoagoseb, secretary-general was Joseph Kauandenge. Kauandenge was suspended in 2010 and left the party. ǀGoagoseb dissolved the NDMC in 2012 and joined SWAPO.

== Political positions ==
The NMDC said that Israel's actions during the 2008–2009 Israel–Gaza conflict were a reflection on their lack of "compassion and humility" while also calling for an immediate ceasefire.

== Electoral results ==
=== Parliamentary elections ===
NMDC contested the 2004 parliamentary election, but received just 4,138 votes, short of the minimum needed for a seat in the National Assembly. Most votes (1,549) came from the Omaheke Region, comprising more than 37% of the party's total votes and earning them 5th place out of 9 parties in the region.

In September 2009, the NDMC launched its campaign for the 2009 elections. Party secretary Kauandenge said that the party list for the National Assembly would place women and youth at high positions. The party also planned to launch the campaign publicly in Gobabis, Omaheke Region, possibly by the end of September 2009. In October 2009, the party listed 25 names, rather than the customary 72. It included only 4 women. NDMC again failed to get a seat in Parliament.

=== Local authority elections ===
In the 2004 local authority election the NDMC only contested positions in the Witvlei village council. It won 2 of the 5 seats.
