= 2004 Namibian general election =

- 15–16 November 2004
- Presidential election
- Turnout: 85.21%
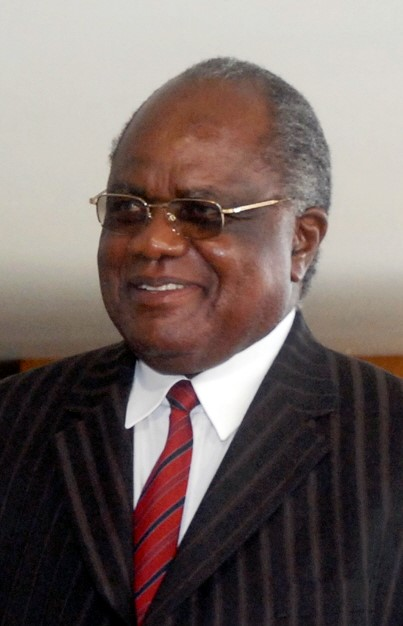

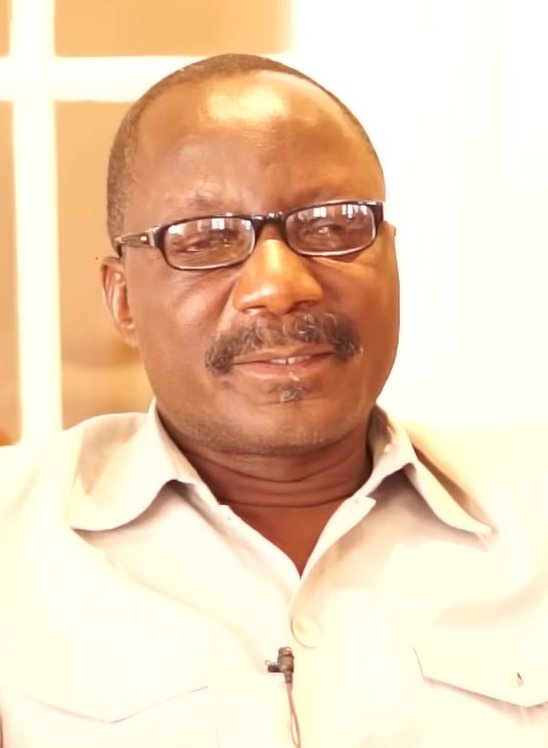

Nominee	Hifikepunye Pohamba	Ben Ulenga	Katuutire Kaura
Party	SWAPO	COD	PDM
Popular vote	625,605	59,547	41,905
Percentage	76.44%	7.28%	5.12%
- Results by region Pohamba: 30–40% 40–50% 50–60% 60–70% 80–90% >90%
President before election
Sam Nujoma
SWAPO
Elected President
Hifikepunye Pohamba
SWAPO

General elections were held in Namibia on 15 and 16 November 2004 to elect the president and members of the National Assembly. The National Assembly election resulted in a landslide win for SWAPO, which won 55 of the 78 seats with over 75% of the vote. SWAPO's candidate for president, Hifikepunye Pohamba, won the presidential election with 76% of the vote. Pohamba was sworn in as president on 21 March 2005 at Independence Stadium in Windhoek.

== Results ==
=== President ===
Candidate	Party	Votes	%
Hifikepunye Pohamba	SWAPO	625,605	76.44
Ben Ulenga	Congress of Democrats	59,547	7.28
Katuutire Kaura	Democratic Turnhalle Alliance	41,905	5.12
Kuaima Riruako	National Unity Democratic Organisation	34,651	4.23
Justus ǁGaroëb	United Democratic Front	31,354	3.83
Henk Mudge	Republican Party	15,955	1.95
Kosie Pretorius	Monitor Action Group	9,378	1.15
Total		818,395	100.00
Valid votes		818,395	98.23
Invalid/blank votes		14,770	1.77
Total votes		833,165	100.00
Registered voters/turnout		977,742	85.21
Source: Government Namibia

=== National Assembly ===
Party	Votes	%	Seats	+/–
SWAPO	620,609	75.83	55	0
Congress of Democrats	59,464	7.27	5	–2
Democratic Turnhalle Alliance	42,070	5.14	4	–3
National Unity Democratic Organisation	34,814	4.25	3	New
United Democratic Front	30,355	3.71	3	+1
Republican Party	16,187	1.98	1	New
Monitor Action Group	6,950	0.85	1	–1
Namibian Democratic Movement for Change	4,380	0.54	0	New
SWANU	3,610	0.44	0	0
Appointed members			6	0
Total	818,439	100.00	78	0
Valid votes	818,439	98.69		
Invalid/blank votes	10,830	1.31		
Total votes	829,269	100.00		
Registered voters/turnout	977,742	84.81		
Source: Government Namibia

=== By region ===
Region	CoD	DTA	MAG	NMDC	NUDO	RP	SWANU	SWAPO	UDF
Caprivi	3,872	1,809	56	38	68	2,745	42	19,596	244
Erongo	6,186	2,746	1,102	281	3,380	1,664	291	39,604	8,127
Hardap	6,098	5,118	599	226	479	1,303	73	15,767	609
ǁKaras	7,059	3,761	671	215	495	1,061	82	25,127	681
Kavango	4,617	5,198	189	194	520	431	235	64,077	795
Khomas	18,872	7,225	1,982	819	8,782	5,040	1,071	87,092	5,880
Kunene	1,324	5,716	393	109	2,015	667	117	9,817	6,511
Ohangwena	443	166	31	64	158	80	133	88,061	374
Omaheke	1,039	3,488	566	1,549	6,849	1,310	821	12,582	491
Omusati	523	163	25	94	751	81	110	92,082	435
Oshana	1674	870	59	85	312	97	93	70,111	366
Oshikoto	2,567	647	244	88	410	228	147	63,769	1,126
Otjozondjupa	5,161	4,762	1,002	344	9,622	1,257	219	31,423	3,690
Source: The Namibian
