= Christian Democratic Voice =

Political party in Namibia

- Abbreviation: CDV
- Secretary-General: Faustus Thomas
- President: Gotthard Kandume
- Founded: 2014
- Ideology: Christian democracy Christian nationalism Pro-life
- Political position: Right-wing to far-right
- Religion: Neo-Pentecostalism
- Colors: Blue and Green

The Christian Democratic Voice (CDV) is a political party in Namibia. It was launched in 2014 and has about 8,000 members.

== Political position ==
The Christian Democratic Voice has its main backing in Pentecostal and Charismatic Christians. The CDV demands "that Namibia be declared a Christian state" and states that "spiritual leaders" are needed in parliament to keep the balance of power in Namibia.

Pentecostal and Charismatic sects in Namibia are accused of exploiting desperate members of the Namibian society. General-secretary Faustus Thomas, although admitting certain problems among these groups, rejects a control of these organizations and has insisted that they should be given time to regulate themselves.

The party calls itself the only pro-life party in Namibia.

== Election results ==
For the 2019 Namibian general election the party formed a coalition with the Rally for Democracy and Progress. The CDV did not file an own candidate for the presidency.

=== National Assembly elections ===
Election	Leader	Votes	%	Seats	+/–	Position	Government
2019	Gotthard Kandume	5,841	0.71%	1 / 96	New	▲10th	Opposition
2024	Gotthard Kandume	1,452	0.13%	0 / 96	▼1	▼20th	Extra-parliamentary
