= Workers Revolutionary Party (Namibia) =

Political party in Namibia

- Abbreviation: WRP
- Leader: Attie Beukes; Harry Boesak
- Founded: May 1989
- Ideology: Communism; Trotskyism; Socialism
- Political position: Left-wing to far-left
- International affiliation: Workers International to Rebuild the Fourth International
- Colors: Red
- Seats in the National Assembly: 0 / 104
- Seats in the National Council: 0 / 42
- Regional Councillors: 0 / 121
- Local Councillors: 0 / 378
- Pan-African Parliament: 0 / 5

The Workers Revolutionary Party (WRP, from 2009 to 2014 named the Communist Party of Namibia) is a Trotskyist in Namibia led by Attie Beukes and Harry Boesak.

The party was founded by Beukes in May 1989 as the Workers Revolutionary Party. It joined the United Democratic Front (UDF) alliance for participation in the 1989 elections. The UDF won four seats in this election for the Constituent Assembly of Namibia, none of which went to the WRP.

== Election results ==
=== 2004 ===
In the 2004 election, the WRP joined SWANU in an alliance of socialist parties. The SWANU-WRP alliance received 3,428 votes, which were below the threshold for winning a seat in the National Assembly.

=== 2009 ===
Under its new name, Communist Party of Namibia, it contested the 2009 general election for seats in the National Assembly and the Presidency.

The party registered for the 2009 election as the fourteenth and final party. Beukes, the party's candidate for president, received 1,005 votes, which was the lowest total of all candidates. The CPN received 810 votes, also the lowest of all contesting parties, which did not qualify them for a seat in the National Assembly. Beukes received his highest vote total in the Mariental Rural constituency in the Hardap Region and the CPN received its highest vote total in the Gibeon, Hardap Region constituency.

=== 2014 ===
The WRP contested the 2014 general election again under its original name, Workers Revolutionary Party. It achieved 1.49% of the vote, which translated into two seats in the National Assembly.

=== 2019 ===
In the 2019 elections the WRP got 3,212 votes for the National Assembly (0.39%) and lost its representation in parliament. It did not submit a candidate for the presidential election.
