= Electoral Commission of Namibia =

Government agency in Namibia

Commission overview
- Formed: 1992
- Jurisdiction: Government of Namibia
- Headquarters: Windhoek, Khomas Region, Namibia
- Commission executives: Notemba Tjipueja, Chairperson; Theo Mujoro, Chief Electoral and Referenda Officer
- Key documents: Constitution of Namibia, article 94B; Electoral Act 24 of 1992

The Electoral Commission of Namibia (ECN) is an agency of the government of Namibia. It was founded in 1992 under the Electoral Act 24 of 1992. The aim of the commission is to oversee all Namibian electoral activities starting from voter registration and political party registration, to the setting and monitoring of elections, counting of ballots and making results available.

The ECN is composed of a chairperson and four commissioners. Candidates are shortlisted by a committee consisting of the Chief Justice, a lawyer suggested by the Law Society and a representative from the Office of the Ombudsman. The president of Namibia then appoints the ECN from this shortlist for a five-year term.

The current Chief Electoral and Referenda Officer (CERO) is Petrus Shaama since September 2023. He replaced Theo Mujoro who had served since September 2018. The chairperson of ECN is Dr. Elsie Tuleingepo Nghikembua since September 2021.

== See also ==
- Politics of Namibia
- List of political parties in Namibia
