= Ignatius Shixwameni =

Namibian politician (1966–2021)

Ignatius Nkotongo Shixwameni (4 September 1966 – 10 November 2021) was a Namibian politician. He was the leader of Namibia's All People's Party.

== Life ==
Shixwameni was born in Shambyu, the traditional kingdom in the Kavango Region, and he earned a Master of Arts degree from the University of Havana in Social Sciences.

Shixwameni was a student leader of the Namibia National Students Organisation (Nanso) at the dawn of independence, a SWAPO Youth League leader from 1987 to 1999 and a SWAPO Central Committee member from 1992 to 1997. Elected to Parliament in 1999 as a member of the party, he joined the opposition Congress of Democrats (CoD) in 2000 as its chief whip.

Shixwameni resigned from the Congress of Democrats in December 2007, along with 21 other members. He founded a new party, the All People's Party, as a split from the Congress of Democrats the next month. In October 2009, the APP selected him as the party's candidate for president.

He was married with two children, and resided in Windhoek.

Shixwameni died on 10 November 2021, after collapsing in parliament.
