= United Democratic Front (Namibia) =

Political party in Namibia

- Abbreviation: UDF
- President: Hendrik Gaobaeb
- Vice President: Nico Somaeb
- Secretary-General: Daniel Tsaneb
- Headquarters: Windhoek; Khomas Region
- Ideology: Damara minority politics
- Colours: Blue; White; Green
- Seats in the National Assembly: 1 / 104
- Seats in the National Council: 2 / 42
- Regional Councillors: 1 / 121
- Local Councillors: 21 / 378
- Pan-African Parliament: 0 / 5

The United Democratic Front (UDF) is a political party in Namibia. Justus ǁGaroëb founded the party in 1989 and led it until 2013. The party president since January 2024 is Hendrik Gaobaeb. The UDF is represented in the National Assembly (2 seats) and the National Council (2 seats). 1 regional councillor and 21 local councillors are from the UDF.

== History ==
The United Democratic Front is a political party that is most widely supported by Damara people. Its roots are in the Damara Council, an administrative body for the Damaraland territory in South West Africa that became a political party in 1980. In 1989, the Damara Council joined other parties in order to participate in the first democratic elections in Namibia. The result of the merger was the United Democratic Front (UDF).

The founding members of the UDF were Justus ǁGaroëb, leader of the Damara Council, and Reggie Diergaardt, leader of the Labour Party. On 20 July 1989, the Patriotic Unity Movement joined the UDF. The UDF formed an alliance with a number of splinter parties prior to the 1989 election:

- CANU-UDF, a wing of CANU, led by George Mutwa
- Workers Revolutionary Party (WRP), led by Attie Beukes, Erica Beukes, and Werner Henry Mamugwe
- Caprivi Alliance Party (CAP), led by Gabriel Siseho
- Original People's Party (OPP), led by Theophelus Soroseb
- Namibia National Independence Party (NNIP), led by Rudolf Ngondo
- Patriotic Unity Movement (PUM), led by Eric Biwa.

=== Leadership ===
- Justus ǁGaroëb (1989–2013)
- Apius Auchab (2013–2024)
- Hendrik Gaobaeb (2024–)

== Electoral history ==
=== Presidential elections ===
Election	Candidate	Votes	%	Result
1999	Justus ǁGaroëb	16,272	3.02%	Lost ✗
2004	Justus ǁGaroëb	31,354	3.83%	Lost ✗
2009	Justus ǁGaroëb	19,258	2.37%	Lost ✗
2014	Did not run			
2019	Apius Auchab	22,115	2.7%	Lost ✗
2024	Hendrik Gaobaeb	12,604	1.15%	Lost ✗

=== National Assembly elections ===
Election	Party leader	Votes	%	Seats	+/–	Position	Result
1989	Justus ǁGaroëb	37,874	5.65%	4 / 72	New	▲3rd	Opposition
1994	Justus ǁGaroëb	13,309	2.72%	2 / 72	▼2	3rd	Opposition
1999	Justus ǁGaroëb	15,685	2.93%	2 / 72	Steady	▼4th	Opposition
2004	Justus ǁGaroëb	30,355	3.71%	3 / 72	▲1	▼5th	Opposition
2009	Justus ǁGaroëb	19,489	2.40%	2 / 72	▼1	5th	Opposition
2014	Apius Auchab	18,945	2.12%	2 / 96	Steady	5th	Opposition
2019	Apius Auchab	14,644	1.79%	2 / 96	0	▼6th	Opposition
2024	Hendrik Gaobaeb	16,828	1.54%	2 / 96	0	6th	Opposition

=== 1989 ===
The UDF received 37,874 votes (5.65%) in the 1989 election, which elected members to the Constituent Assembly of Namibia. The Constituent Assembly elected the first President and wrote Namibia's constitution. From the UDF, President Justus ǁGaroëb, Reggie Diergaardt, Eric Biwa and Theophelus Soroseb were chosen for the assembly.

=== 1992 ===
The UDF won one seat in the 1992 elections for the National Council of Namibia.

=== 1994 ===
In 1994, electoral support for the party diminished in both relative and total support. The party received 13,309 total votes (2.72% of the national vote). Two UDF members were elected to the National Assembly (ǁGaroëb and Biwa).

=== 1998 ===
The party retained its single seat in the National Council in 1998.

=== 1999 ===
Following the 1999 parliamentary election, the UDF formed a coalition with the Democratic Turnhalle Alliance (DTA) so that the two parties could together be the official opposition despite the Congress of Democrats receiving the second highest number of votes.

=== 2004 ===
In the parliamentary election held on November 15 and 16, 2004, the party won 3.5% of popular votes and three out of 78 seats 1. More than half (16,081 of 29,336 total votes) of the party's electoral support came from Khomas Region, Kunene Region and Otjozondjupa Region, with the single largest total coming from Kunene. The party again retained its single seat in the National Council in 2004. The UDF MPs elected in 2004 were Justus ǁGaroëb, Gustaphine Tjombe and Michael Goreseb.

=== 2009 ===
In the November 2009 general election, Justus ǁGaroëb once again ran for election to Namibia's presidency with the UDF; he received 19,258 total votes, representing 2.37% of all votes and finished in fifth place. The party earned two seats in the National Assembly, down from 3 in 2004. The two seats went to party leader Justus ǁGaroëb and Simson Tjongarero.
