= 2014 Namibian general election =

- 28 November 2014
- Presidential election
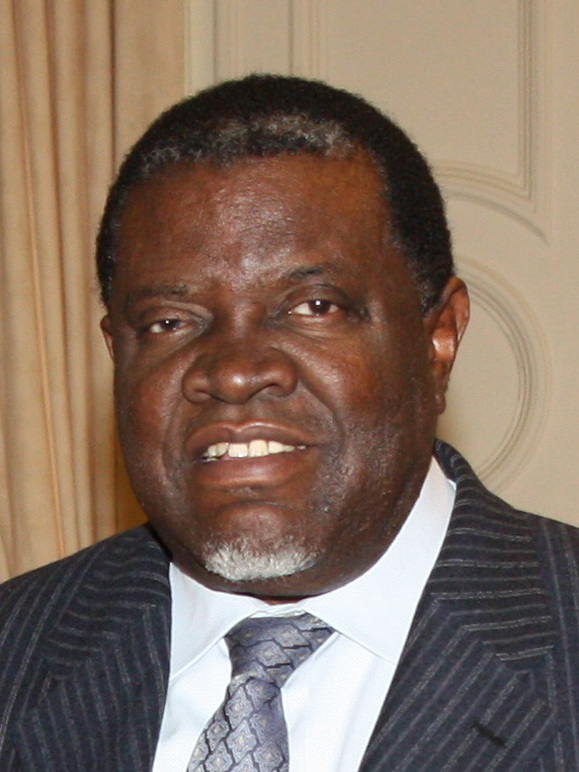

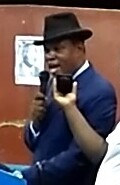
Nominee	Hage Geingob	McHenry Venaani
Party	SWAPO	DTA
Popular vote	772,528	44,271
Percentage	86.73%	4.97%
- Results by region
President before election
Hifikepunye Pohamba
SWAPO
Elected President
Hage Geingob
SWAPO

General elections were held in Namibia on 28 November 2014, although early voting took place in foreign polling stations and for seagoing personnel on 14 November. The elections were the first on the African continent to use electronic voting.

A total of nine candidates ran for the presidency, whilst 16 political parties contested the National Assembly elections. Hage Geingob of the ruling SWAPO party won the presidential elections with 87% of the vote. SWAPO also won the National Assembly elections, taking 80% of the vote.

== Presidential election ==
=== Candidates ===
Originally, incumbent President Pohamba predicted that twenty-two candidates would contest the presidential election. In the end, only nine political parties submitted presidential candidates.

=== SWAPO ===
In 2008, the SWAPO Central Committee produced a policy document stating that the party's candidate would be chosen for each election among the top four Committee members. In March 2011 SWAPO declared that whoever was the party's vice-president following the forthcoming party elections would also be the party's candidate in 2014 for president. Some high-level party members, particularly Kazenambo Kazenambo, advocated that SWAPO choose a non-Ovambo candidate, as the first two Presidents, Sam Nujoma and Pohamba, were from the Ovambo people. Others advocated the selection of a woman. SWAPO indicated that the candidate would be chosen democratically in the 2012 party election.

SWAPO was viewed as the clear favorite going into the election.

== Parliamentary election ==
SWAPO announced a gender equality system where women would fill half of the party's seats in parliament. The party also embraced what it called a "zebra system", whereby if a minister was a woman, the deputy minister would be a man, and vice versa. Because there were more male SWAPO MPs than female MPs, SWAPO put forward plans to expand parliament to remove the risk of male MPs losing their seats as a result of this gender policy. These changes to the constitution were approved a month prior to the election against the votes of opposition parties, as SWAPO had a two-thirds majority in parliament. Since then, instead of 78 seats (72 elected, 6 appointed) there are 104 seats in the National Assembly (96 elected, 8 appointed).

== Results ==
=== President ===
Candidate	Party	Votes	%
Hage Geingob	SWAPO	772,528	86.73
McHenry Venaani	Democratic Turnhalle Alliance	44,271	4.97
Hidipo Hamutenya	Rally for Democracy and Progress	30,197	3.39
Asser Mbai	National Unity Democratic Organisation	16,740	1.88
Henk Mudge	Republican Party	8,676	0.97
Ignatius Shixwameni	All People's Party	7,266	0.82
Usutuaije Maamberua	SWANU	5,028	0.56
Ben Ulenga	Congress of Democrats	3,518	0.39
Jan Mukwilongo	Namibian Economic Freedom Fighters	2,514	0.28
Total		890,738	100.00
Registered voters/turnout		1,241,194	–
Source: ECN

=== National Assembly ===
Party	Votes	%	Seats	+/–
SWAPO	715,026	80.01	77	+23
Democratic Turnhalle Alliance	42,933	4.80	5	+3
Rally for Democracy and Progress	31,372	3.51	3	–5
All People's Party	20,431	2.29	2	+1
United Democratic Front	18,945	2.12	2	0
National Unity Democratic Organisation	17,942	2.01	2	0
Workers Revolutionary Party	13,328	1.49	2	+2
SWANU	6,354	0.71	1	0
United People's Movement	6,353	0.71	1	New
Republican Party	6,099	0.68	1	0
Congress of Democrats	3,404	0.38	0	–1
Namibian Economic Freedom Fighters	3,259	0.36	0	New
Monitor Action Group	3,073	0.34	0	0
Christian Democratic Voice	2,606	0.29	0	New
National Democratic Party	1,389	0.16	0	0
Democratic Party of Namibia	1,131	0.13	0	0
Appointed members			8	+2
Total	893,645	100.00	104	+26
Registered voters/turnout	1,241,194	–		
Source: ECN
