= 2019 Namibian general election =

- 27 November 2019
- Registered: 1,358,468
- Presidential election
- Turnout: 60.82%
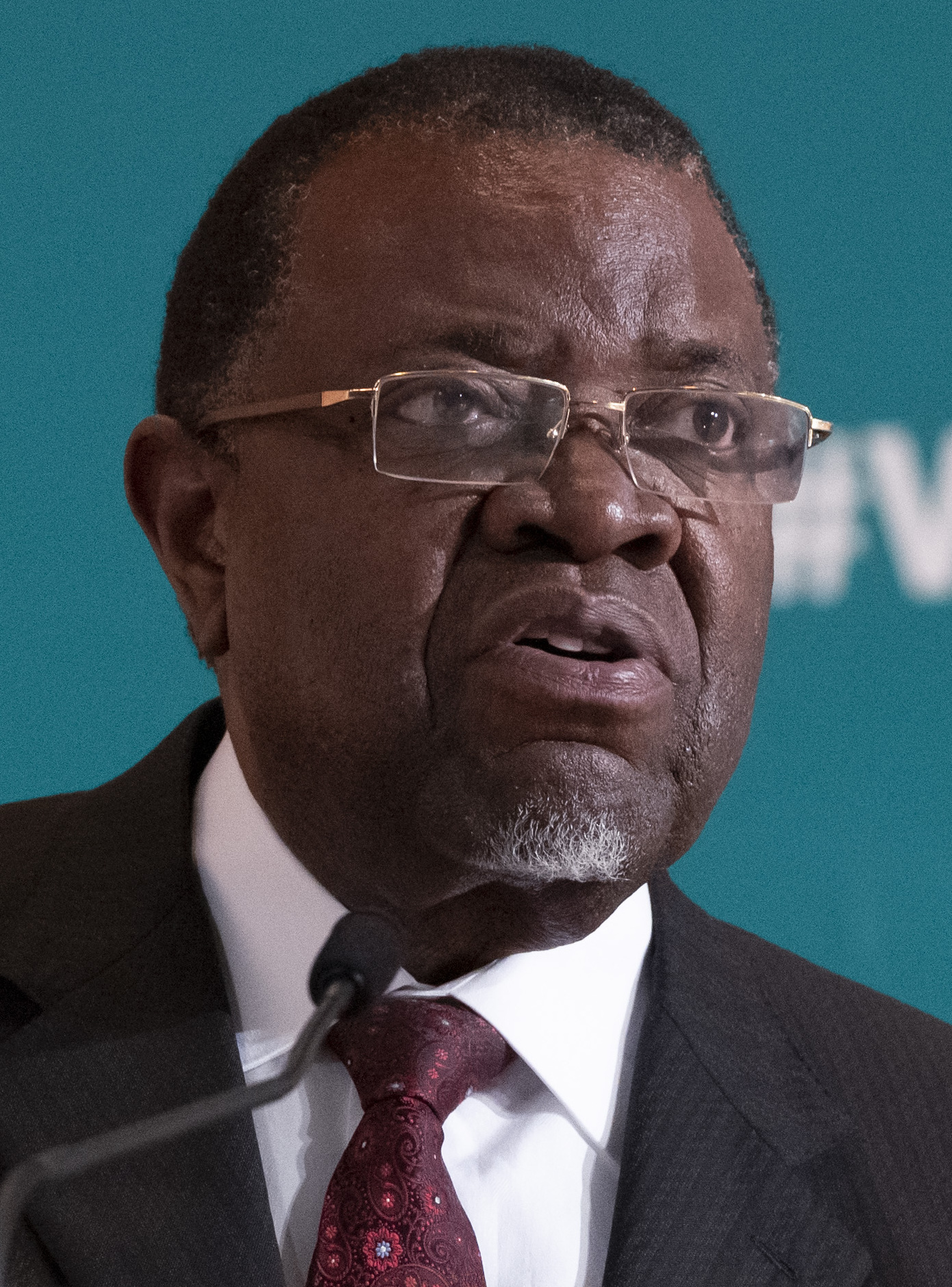

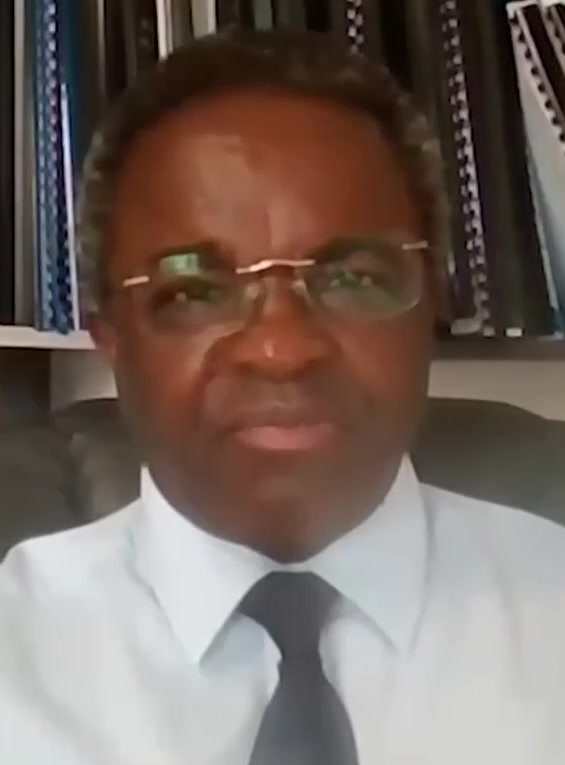

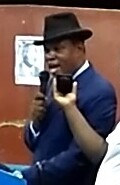
| Nominee | Hage Geingob | Panduleni Itula | McHenry Venaani |
| Party | SWAPO | Independent | PDM |
| Popular vote | 464,703 | 242,657 | 43,959 |
| Percentage | 56.25% | 29.37% | 5.32% |
President before election
Hage Geingob
SWAPO
Elected President
Hage Geingob
SWAPO
- Parliamentary election
- 96 of the 104 seats in the National Assembly; 49 seats needed for a majority
| Party | Leader | Vote % | Seats | +/– |
|---|---|---|---|---|
| SWAPO | Hage Geingob | 65.45 | 63 | −14 |
| PDM | McHenry Venaani | 16.65 | 16 | +11 |
| LPM | Bernadus Swartbooi | 4.75 | 4 | New |
| NUDO | Esther Muinjangue | 1.96 | 2 | 0 |
| APP | Ignatius Shixwameni | 1.79 | 2 | 0 |
| UDF | Apius Auchab | 1.79 | 2 | 0 |
| RP | Henk Mudge | 1.77 | 2 | +1 |
| NEFF | Epafras Mukwiilongo | 1.66 | 2 | +2 |
| RDP | Mike Kavekotora | 1.09 | 1 | −2 |
| CDV | Faustus Thomas | 0.71 | 1 | +1 |
| SWANU | Tangeni Iiyambo | 0.65 | 1 | 0 |
This lists parties that won seats. See the complete results below.
- Maps

General elections were held in Namibia on 27 November 2019. Ballots were cast using electronic voting. A total of eleven candidates ran for the presidency and fifteen political parties contested the National Assembly elections.

Hage Geingob of SWAPO was re-elected to the presidency, although his vote share was reduced from 87% in 2014 to 56%, SWAPO's lowest vote share ever for a presidential election. SWAPO also retained their majority in the National Assembly, but lost their two-thirds supermajority, which it had held since the 1994 elections.

== Electoral system ==
The President of Namibia is elected using the two-round system; if no candidate receives more than 50% in the first round of voting, a run-off will be held. No previous presidential votes in Namibia have gone to a second round.

The 104 members of the National Assembly consist of 96 elected members and eight (non-voting) members appointed by the President. The 96 elected members are elected by closed list proportional representation from a single nationwide district. Seats are allocated using the largest remainder method.

== Political parties ==
=== SWAPO ===
SWAPO was viewed as the clear favorite going into the 2019 election, although the rise of new parties, such as the Landless People's Movement, was predicted to cause a split in the vote. In 2014, the ruling SWAPO Party announced a gender equality system where half of SWAPO's seats in parliament would be held by women. The party also embraced what it called a "zebra system", whereby if a minister was a woman, the deputy minister would be a man, and vice versa. Due to there being more male SWAPO MPs than female MPs, SWAPO put forward plans to expand parliament to remove the risk of male MPs losing their seats as a result of this gender equality policy. This change, raising the number of seats from 78 to 104, was enacted in 2014, although it was officially framed as allowing for wider representation of the population.

=== Opposition ===
Opposition parties had the objective of removing SWAPO's two-thirds majority in the National Assembly. The Namibian Economic Freedom Fighters (NEFF) and the Republican Party (RP), both without a realistic chance in the previous elections, withdrew their presidential candidates in early November and instead endorsed the independent candidate Panduleni Itula. The United Democratic Front (UDF) in turn withdrew their candidate to back McHenry Venaani, presidential candidate of the Popular Democratic Movement (PDM) and leader of the official opposition. In August 2019, the two parties signed a coalition agreement for the coming legislative period, allocating parliamentary seats 6, 13 and 18 to the UPM, and the others to PDM, in an entity to be known as the PDM-UPM coalition. The Rally for Democracy and Progress (RDP) formed a coalition with the Christian Democratic Voice (CDV), both parties supported Mike Kavekotora of the RDP.

=== Parties that contested the legislative election ===
The following parties fielded candidates to contest the legislative election:

| Party | | Leader | Founded | 2014 result | |
| Party | | Leader | Founded | Votes (%) | Seats |
|---|---|---|---|---|---|
| SWAPO | South West Africa People's Organisation | Hage Geingob | 1960 | 80.01% | 77 / 104 |
| PDM | Popular Democratic Movement | McHenry Venaani | 1977 | 4.80% | 5 / 104 |
| RDP | Rally for Democracy and Progress | Mike Kavekotora | 2007 | 3.51% | 3 / 104 |
| APP | All People's Party | Ignatius Shixwameni | 2007 | 2.29% | 2 / 104 |
| UDF | United Democratic Front | Apius Auchab | 1989 | 2.12% | 2 / 104 |
| NUDO | National Unity Democratic Organisation | Esther Muinjangue | 1964 | 2.01% | 2 / 104 |
| WRP | Workers Revolutionary Party | Hewat Beukes | 1984 | 1.49% | 2 / 104 |
| SWANU | South West African National Union | Tangeni Iiyambo | 1959 | 0.71% | 1 / 104 |
| RP | Republican Party | Henk Mudge | 1977 | 0.68% | 1 / 104 |
| COD | Congress of Democrats | Ben Ulenga | 1999 | 0.38% | 0 / 104 |
| NEFF | Namibian Economic Freedom Fighters | Epafras Mukwiilongo | 2014 | 0.36% | 0 / 104 |
| CDV | Christian Democratic Voice | Faustus Thomas | 2014 | 0.29% | 0 / 104 |
| NDP | National Democratic Party | —N/a | 2003 | 0.16% | 0 / 104 |
| NPF | National Patriotic Front | Uapiruka Papama | 1989 | —N/a | —N/a |
| LPM | Landless People's Movement | Bernadus Swartbooi | 2016 | —N/a | —N/a |

== Campaign ==
Ten candidates contested the presidential elections, with Hage Geingob of SWAPO widely expected to win a second term as president. For the first time, an independent candidate, Panduleni Itula, ran for president. Esther Muinjangue of the National Unity Democratic Organisation (NUDO) was the first female presidential candidate in Namibia.

== Results ==
=== President ===
Hage Geingob won the presidential election and received a second term as president. His percentage of votes gained, however, dropped significantly from 87% in 2014 to 56% in 2019. While rural areas predominantly supported Geingob, many urban centres voted for the independent candidate, Panduleni Itula, who received 29% of the overall votes. No other candidate achieved a two-digit result.

| Candidate | Party | Votes | % |
|---|---|---|---|
| Hage Geingob | SWAPO | 464,703 | 56.25 |
| Panduleni Itula | Independent | 242,657 | 29.37 |
| McHenry Venaani | Popular Democratic Movement | 43,959 | 5.32 |
| Bernadus Swartbooi | Landless People's Movement | 22,542 | 2.73 |
| Apius Auchab | United Democratic Front | 22,115 | 2.68 |
| Esther Muinjangue | National Unity Democratic Organisation | 12,039 | 1.46 |
| Tangeni Iiyambo | SWANU | 5,959 | 0.72 |
| Henk Mudge | Republican Party | 4,379 | 0.53 |
| Mike Kavekotora | Rally for Democracy and Progress | 3,515 | 0.43 |
| Ignatius Shixwameni | All People's Party | 3,304 | 0.40 |
| Epafras Mukwiilongo | Namibian Economic Freedom Fighters | 1,026 | 0.12 |
| Total | | 826,198 | 100.00 |
| Valid votes | | 826,198 | 100.00 |
| Invalid/blank votes | | 0 | 0.00 |
| Total votes | | 826,198 | 100.00 |
| Registered voters/turnout | | 1,358,468 | 60.82 |
Source: ECN

=== National Assembly ===
SWAPO won a majority of seats in the National Assembly, as it had in years prior, but narrowly missed the threshold for a two-thirds majority, which it had held since 1994. Consequently, opposition parties also gained seats, most prominently the PDM, which obtained 16 seats in the National Assembly. The PDM's 16.60% vote share is its best electoral performance since the 1994 election.

| Party | Votes | % | Seats | +/– |
|---|---|---|---|---|
| SWAPO | 536,861 | 65.45 | 63 | –14 |
| Popular Democratic Movement | 136,576 | 16.65 | 16 | +11 |
| Landless People's Movement | 38,956 | 4.75 | 4 | New |
| National Unity Democratic Organisation | 16,066 | 1.96 | 2 | 0 |
| All People's Party | 14,664 | 1.79 | 2 | 0 |
| United Democratic Front | 14,644 | 1.79 | 2 | 0 |
| Republican Party | 14,546 | 1.77 | 2 | +1 |
| Namibian Economic Freedom Fighters | 13,580 | 1.66 | 2 | +2 |
| Rally for Democracy and Progress | 8,953 | 1.09 | 1 | –2 |
| Christian Democratic Voice | 5,841 | 0.71 | 1 | +1 |
| SWANU | 5,330 | 0.65 | 1 | 0 |
| Congress of Democrats | 4,654 | 0.57 | 0 | 0 |
| National Democratic Party | 4,559 | 0.56 | 0 | 0 |
| Workers Revolutionary Party | 3,212 | 0.39 | 0 | –2 |
| National Patriotic Front | 1,785 | 0.22 | 0 | New |
| Appointed members | | | 8 | 0 |
| Total | 820,227 | 100.00 | 104 | 0 |
| Valid votes | 820,227 | 100.00 | | |
| Invalid/blank votes | 0 | 0.00 | | |
| Total votes | 820,227 | 100.00 | | |
| Registered voters/turnout | 1,358,468 | 60.38 | | |
Source: ECN

== Legal challenge ==
Runner-up Itula challenged the outcome of the elections in court, based on the Electoral Act of 2014 that allows electronic voting machines (EVMs) only in combination with a Verifiable Paper Trail (VPPT). For the Namibian elections in 2014, 2015 and now 2019, EVMs without a paper trail were used after Charles Namoloh, the responsible minister at the time, enacted the law without the paper trail provision. The Supreme Court of Namibia ruled in February 2020 that this enactment was unconstitutional because it violates the separation of powers. The court, however, declined to set aside the elections carried out using such failed process, as there were no indications the devices were tampered with. This has attracted some controversy.
