= Foreign relations of Namibia =

Namibia follows a largely independent foreign policy, with strong affiliations with states that aided the independence struggle, including Nigeria, Libya, and Cuba.

In Africa, Namibia has been involved in conflicts in neighbouring Angola as well as Democratic Republic of the Congo.

== International organisations ==
Namibia is a member of 47 international organisations. These are:

- Lomé Convention (ACP)
- African Development Bank (AfDB)
- African Union (AU)
- Commonwealth of Nations (C)
- Food and Agriculture Organization (FAO)
- Group of 77 (G-77)
- International Atomic Energy Agency (IAEA)
- International Bank for Reconstruction and Development (IBRD)
- International Civil Aviation Organization (ICAO)
- International Criminal Court (ICCt)
- International Confederation of Free Trade Unions (ICFTU)
- ICRM
- International Fund for Agricultural Development (IFAD)
- International Finance Corporation (IFC)
- International Federation of Red Cross and Red Crescent Societies (IFRCS)
- International Labour Organization (ILO)
- International Monetary Fund (IMF)
- Interpol
- International Olympic Committee (IOC)
- International Organization for Migration (IOM, observer)
- IPU
- International Organization for Standardization (ISO, correspondent)
- International Telecommunication Union (ITU)
- MIGA
- Non-Aligned Movement (NAM)
- ONUB
- Organisation for the Prohibition of Chemical Weapons (OPCW)
- Port Management Association of Eastern and Southern Africa (PMAESA)
- Southern African Customs Union (SACU)
- Southern African Development Community (SADC)
- United Nations (UN)
- United Nations Conference on Trade and Development (UNCTAD)
- United Nations Educational, Scientific and Cultural Organization (UNESCO)
- United Nations High Commissioner for Refugees (UNHCR)
- United Nations Industrial Development Organization (UNIDO)
- United Nations Mission in Ethiopia and Eritrea (UNMEE)
- United Nations Mission in Liberia (UNMIL)
- UNMIS
- UNOCI
- Universal Postal Union (UPU)
- WCL
- World Customs Organization (WCO)
- World Health Organization (WHO)
- World Intellectual Property Organization (WIPO)
- World Meteorological Organization (WMO)
- World Tourism Organization (WToO)
- World Trade Organization (WTrO)

=== United Nations ===
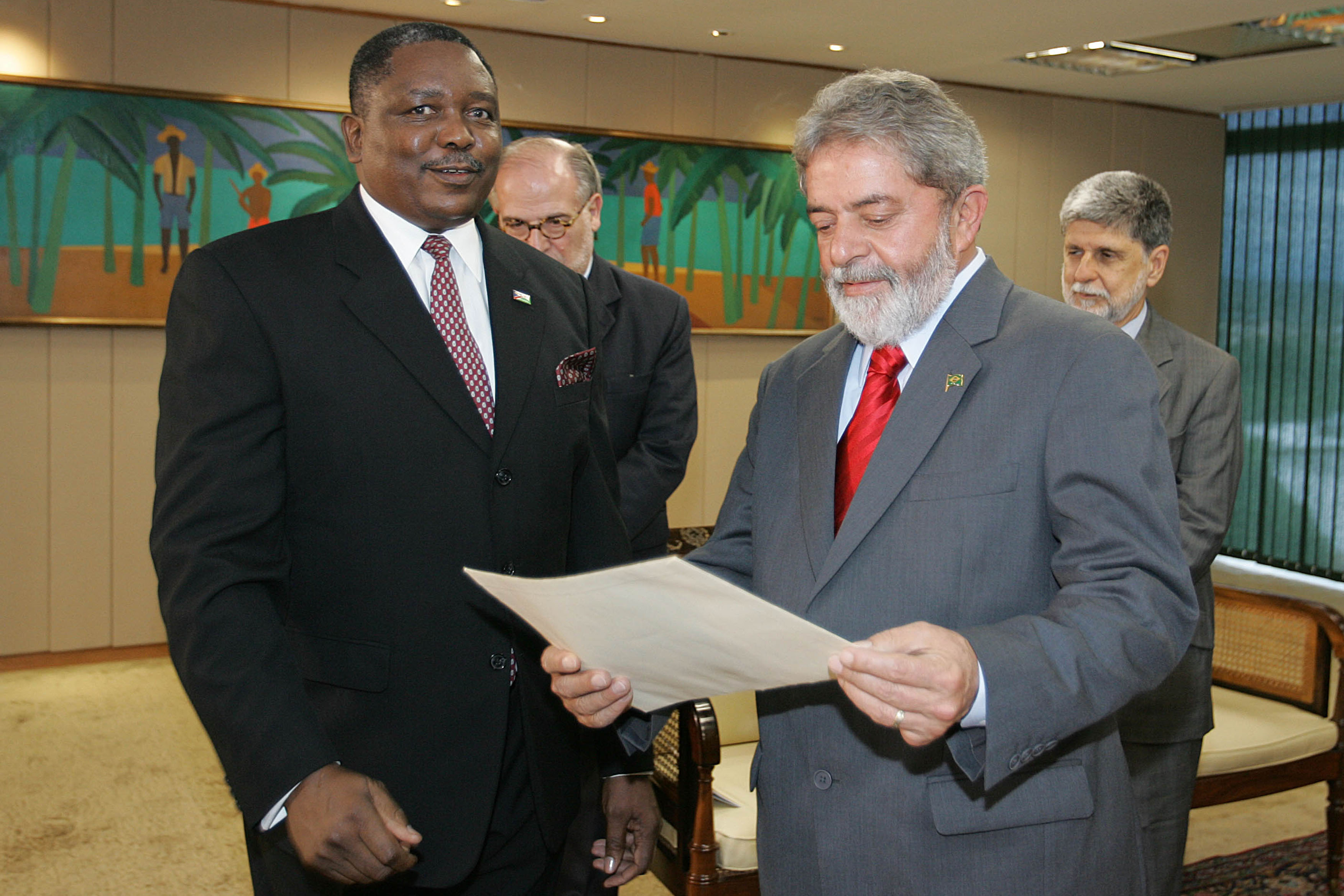
Namibian ambassador to Brazil, Hopelong Ushona Ipinge (left) with President of Brazil, Luiz Inácio Lula da Silva at Palácio do Planalto, Brasília in 2006

Namibia became the 160th member of the United Nations on 23 April 1990 upon independence from South Africa.

== International disputes ==
Namibia is involved in several minor international disputes.

- Commission established with Botswana to resolve small residual disputes along the Caprivi Strip, including the Situngu marshlands along the Linyanti River
- Botswana residents protest Namibia's planned construction of the Okavango hydroelectric dam on Popa Falls
- Managed dispute with South Africa over the location of the boundary in the Orange River
- Dormant dispute remains where Botswana, Namibia, Zambia, and Zimbabwe boundaries converge

== Diplomatic relations ==
List of countries which Namibia maintains diplomatic relations with:

#	Country	Date
1	Algeria	21 March 1990
2	Brazil	21 March 1990
3	Canada	21 March 1990
4	Denmark	21 March 1990
5	Finland	21 March 1990
6	Germany	21 March 1990
7	Ghana	21 March 1990
8	India	21 March 1990
9	Iran	21 March 1990
10	Japan	21 March 1990
11	Kenya	21 March 1990
12	Malawi	21 March 1990
13	Malaysia	21 March 1990
14	Nigeria	21 March 1990
15	North Korea	21 March 1990
16	Norway	21 March 1990
—	State of Palestine	21 March 1990
17	Poland	21 March 1990
18	Romania	21 March 1990
19	Russia	21 March 1990
20	Serbia	21 March 1990
21	South Korea	21 March 1990
22	Spain	21 March 1990
23	Sweden	21 March 1990
24	Tanzania	21 March 1990
25	United Kingdom	21 March 1990
26	United States	21 March 1990
27	Vietnam	21 March 1990
28	Zimbabwe	21 March 1990
29	China	22 March 1990
30	Hungary	22 March 1990
31	Pakistan	22 March 1990
32	Republic of the Congo	23 March 1990
33	Morocco	23 March 1990
34	Tunisia	23 March 1990
35	Vanuatu	23 March 1990
36	Switzerland	24 March 1990
37	Kuwait	27 March 1990
38	Turkey	27 March 1990
39	Cuba	2 April 1990
40	Barbados	6 April 1990
41	Angola	11 April 1990
42	Lesotho	11 April 1990
43	Italy	12 April 1990
44	Venezuela	12 April 1990
45	Mexico	17 April 1990
46	Senegal	18 April 1990
47	Netherlands	23 April 1990
48	Colombia	28 April 1990
49	Liberia	28 April 1990
50	Papua New Guinea	30 April 1990
51	France	3 May 1990
52	Libya	8 May 1990
53	Egypt	20 May 1990
—	Sahrawi Arab Democratic Republic	31 May 1990
54	Bulgaria	6 June 1990
55	Czech Republic	11 June 1990
56	Iraq	3 July 1990
57	Cameroon	10 July 1990
58	Peru	11 July 1990
59	Ecuador	12 July 1990
60	Maldives	25 July 1990
61	Botswana	26 July 1990
62	Argentina	31 July 1990
63	Albania	2 August 1990
64	Zambia	5 August 1990
65	Greece	9 August 1990
66	Benin	13 August 1990
67	Jamaica	28 August 1990
68	Belgium	21 September 1990
69	Afghanistan	3 October 1990
70	Democratic Republic of the Congo	3 October 1990
71	Austria	5 October 1990
72	Chile	15 October 1990
73	Mongolia	30 October 1990
74	Thailand	6 November 1990
75	Sudan	8 November 1990
76	Suriname	15 November 1990
77	Yemen	26 November 1990
78	Iceland	10 December 1990
79	Rwanda	21 December 1990
80	Bangladesh	1990
81	Ethiopia	1990
82	New Zealand	23 January 1991
83	Indonesia	13 May 1991
84	Portugal	22 November 1991
85	Seychelles	9 December 1991
86	Eswatini	28 February 1992
87	Ukraine	5 October 1992
88	Ivory Coast	3 December 1992
89	Uganda	1990–1992
90	Guatemala	19 February 1993
91	Eritrea	28 January 1994
92	Israel	11 February 1994
93	Slovenia	24 March 1994
94	South Africa	10 May 1994
95	Australia	8 June 1994
96	Uruguay	13 September 1994
97	Guyana	3 November 1994
98	Singapore	9 November 1994
99	Trinidad and Tobago	1 December 1994
100	Ireland	1994
—	Holy See	12 September 1995
101	Bosnia and Herzegovina	19 October 1995
102	Philippines	17 May 1996
103	Brunei	27 June 1996
104	United Arab Emirates	22 July 1996
105	Cape Verde	21 August 1996
106	Qatar	16 October 1996
107	Luxembourg	14 January 1997
108	Dominican Republic	7 February 1997
109	Latvia	11 April 1997
110	Mauritius	16 July 1997
111	Slovakia	9 November 1997
112	Croatia	22 June 1998
113	Sri Lanka	8 April 1999
114	Uzbekistan	30 August 1999
115	Kyrgyzstan	29 November 2000
116	Belarus	21 December 2000
117	Panama	April 2002
118	Guinea	18 September 2002
119	Sierra Leone	18 September 2002
120	Cyprus	20 June 2003
121	Timor-Leste	1 October 2003
122	Estonia	26 May 2004
123	Mali	27 October 2004
124	Malta	9 December 2004
125	Madagascar	13 July 2005
126	Lithuania	22 December 2005
127	Paraguay	17 April 2006
128	Armenia	2 October 2006
129	Mozambique	23 November 2006
130	Bahamas	15 May 2008
131	El Salvador	5 August 2008
—	Sovereign Military Order of Malta	31 March 2009
132	Montenegro	16 November 2009
133	Burundi	23 April 2010
134	Cambodia	25 June 2010
135	Mauritania	29 September 2010
136	Togo	24 November 2010
137	South Sudan	12 July 2011
138	Equatorial Guinea	3 August 2011
139	North Macedonia	21 December 2011
140	Gabon	17 October 2012
141	Niger	26 March 2014
142	Burkina Faso	23 July 2014
143	Kazakhstan	7 October 2014
144	Haiti	24 October 2014
145	Costa Rica	12 December 2014
146	Saudi Arabia	29 July 2015
147	Georgia	5 November 2015
148	Central African Republic	21 July 2016
149	Chad	25 October 2016
150	Djibouti	15 May 2017
151	Gambia	11 December 2017
152	Oman	27 February 2018
153	São Tomé and Príncipe	14 September 2018
154	Monaco	12 September 2019
155	Nicaragua	16 October 2019
156	Azerbaijan	17 October 2019
157	Saint Lucia	29 October 2019
158	Saint Vincent and the Grenadines	5 December 2019
159	Liechtenstein	22 September 2021
160	Comoros	20 October 2021
161	Guinea-Bissau	8 December 2023
162	Belize	24 September 2024
163	Andorra	25 September 2024
164	Bahrain	26 September 2024
165	Tajikistan	26 September 2024
166	Somalia	29 January 2025
167	Moldova	22 September 2026
168	Saint Kitts and Nevis	22 September 2026
169	Nepal	25 September 2026
170	Grenada	26 September 2026
171	San Marino	26 September 2026

== Bilateral relations ==
=== Africa ===
Country	Formal Relations Began	Notes
Angola		See Angola–Namibia relations In 1999 Namibia signed a mutual defence pact with its northern neighbour Angola. This affected the Angolan Civil War that has been ongoing since Angola's independence in 1975. Namibia's ruling party SWAPO wanted to support the ruling party MPLA in Angola to fight the rebel movement UNITA, whose stronghold is in southern Angola, bordering Namibia. The defence pact allowed Angolan troops to use Namibian territory when attacking UNITA. The alliance between SWAPO and MPLA has deep roots and began as both Angola's and Namibia's ruling parties sought independence during the mid-20th century and into the Angolan Civil War. In Angola, the leftist movement MPLA was fighting the rightist movement UNITA, which was supported by South Africa. In Namibia, SWAPO, then a rebel movement, was fighting for independence from South Africa along the Angolan border. Angola allowed SWAPO to establish training and refugee camps for Namibians and PLAN (People's Liberation Army of Namibia) fighters. As MPLA and SWAPO shared a common ideological ground, and had a common enemy in South Africa, they came to cooperate. The Angolan civil war resulted in a large number of Angolan refugees coming to Namibia. At its peak in 2001 there were over 30,000 Angolan refugees in Namibia. The calmer situation in Angola has made it possible for many of them to return to their home with the help of UNHCR, and in 2004 only 12,600 remained in Namibia.
Botswana		See Botswana–Namibia relations
Ethiopia		During the South African occupation of Namibia, Ethiopia was one of the country's leading proponents abroad; Ethiopia and Liberia were the first two states to bring the question of independence for then South West Africa to the United Nations. In 2007, the two governments signed an agreement which expanded air travel between the two states. In December 2009, Namibia's Foreign Minister, Marko Hausiku met with Ethiopian Foreign Affairs Minister Seyoum Mesfin and noted the economic, science, technical and cultural agreements in place between the two countries and expressed a desire to improve the trade relations.: Ethiopia is accredited to Namibia from its embassy in Pretoria, South Africa.; Namibia has an embassy in Addis Ababa.
Liberia		In 1960, Liberia and Ethiopia brought litigation against apartheid South Africa in the International Court of Justice to end its occupation of Namibia. As part of Liberia's support for Namibia's liberation struggle, many Namibian students received Liberian passports which helped them study abroad. As of July 2008, a total of 5,900 Namibia Defence Force troops had been rotated through Liberia as part of the United Nations Mission in Liberia. Namibia maintained a battalion of about 800 personnel in Grand Cape Mount county for several years, for most of the period part of UNMIL Sector 2, headquartered at Tubmanburg. In May 2005, Namibian troops were accused of sexual exploitation of young girls and women; three Namibian soldiers were sent home from the force after a United Nations investigation found them guilty of "engaging in sexual activity with civilians", which is against United Nations rules for peacekeepers.
Nigeria	21 March 1990	Both countries established diplomatic relations on 21 March 1990 Namibia and Nigeria have binding bilateral agreements, but as of 2014, trade between the two countries was low. In March 2014, Nigerian President Goodluck Jonathan visited Namibia for Namibia's 24th independence day celebrations. The two countries also discussed establishing an oil refinery in Namibia for Nigerian oil.: Namibia has a high commission in Abuja.
South Africa		See Namibia–South Africa relations Upon independence in 1990, Namibia's economy was still tied to South Africa's. To this day, the economy of Namibia is still closely contacted to South Africa through both institutional relationships (Southern African Customs Union, for example) and privately owned mining concessions.
Zambia	5 August 1990	See Namibia–Zambia relations Both countries established diplomatic relations on 5 August 1990: Namibia has a high commission in Lusaka.; Zambia has a high commission in Windhoek.
Zimbabwe		See Namibia–Zimbabwe relations The ruling parties of Namibia (since independence in 1990) and Zimbabwe (since independence in 1980) have been close since pre-independence days, as both were anti-colonial movements against white-minority governments. Namibia sent troops in the Namibia Defence Force to the Democratic Republic of the Congo alongside Zimbabwe in a SADC coalition to support President Joseph Kabila.: Namibia has an embassy in Harare.; Zimbabwe has an embassy in Windhoek.

=== Americas ===
Country	Formal Relations Began	Notes
Brazil	1990	See Brazil–Namibia relations: Brazil has an embassy in Windhoek.; Namibia has an embassy in Brasília.
Canada		See Canada–Namibia relations Canada's relationship with Namibia began in 1977 when Canada joined the Western Contact Group, a joint diplomatic effort of France, United Kingdom, United States, Canada and West Germany to bring an internationally acceptable transition to independence for Namibia. In 1990 official relations started; Canada has dispatched an Honorary Consul to Windhoek. Canada is one of the main destinations for Namibian refugees. Together with Botswana and Denmark, Canada has been granting asylum to people fleeing Namibia in the aftermath of the Caprivi conflict, and particularly the Caprivi treason trial that followed in which the Namibian government was accused of human rights violations. Only in 2010 Canada has changed its standpoint and is now considering the CLA to be a terrorist organisation that has "attempted to usurp an elected government". Nonetheless, Canada received a steady inflow of Namibian immigrants who seek economic betterment under the pretense of humiliation and harassment in Namibia. In 2011 more than 1,000 Namibians entered Canada. Three-quarters of them applied for refugee status, but only a few were successful.: Canada is accredited to Namibia from its high commission in Pretoria, South Africa.; Namibia is accredited to Canada from its embassy in Washington, D.C., United States.
Cuba		See Cuba–Namibia relations Cuban-Namibian relations date back to the Namibian War of Independence when Cuba politically, militarily and diplomatically supported the Namibian rebel organisation and future ruling party, South West Africa People's Organization (SWAPO) against the military of Apartheid South Africa. Since independence, Namibia and Cuba have held joint meetings every two years for Economic, Scientific-Technical and Commercial Cooperation. In 2005, it was reported that 1,460 Cuban professionals had worked in Namibia, including 208 in 2005.: Cuba has an embassy in Windhoek.; Namibia has an embassy in Havana.
Mexico	17 April 1990	See Mexico–Namibia relations Mexico recognised and established diplomatic relations with Namibia on 17 April 1990. In 1993, Mexico opened an embassy in Windhoek, however, the embassy was closed in 2002.: Mexico is accredited to Namibia from its embassy in Pretoria, South Africa.; Namibia is accredited to Mexico from its embassy in Washington, D.C., United States.
United States		See Namibia–United States relations US-Namibian relations are good and continue to improve. Characterised by shared democratic values, commitment to rule of law, and respect for human rights, the bilateral relationship has been strengthened through trade ties and US assistance programs. Namibia has seized opportunities created by AGOA. Currently the SACU countries and the US are negotiating a Trade, Investment and Development Cooperation Agreement, scheduled to be signed in 2008. Namibia has been included in President Bush's International Mother and Child HIV Initiative and the Emergency Plan for AIDS Relief. The US Agency for International Development's (USAID) bilateral presence in Namibia has been extended until 2010. In addition to the embassy, the Centers for Disease Control, Peace Corps, and the United States Department of Defense have offices in Windhoek.: Namibia has an embassy in Washington, D.C.; United States has an embassy in Windhoek.

=== Asia ===
Country	Formal Relations Began	Notes
China		See China–Namibia relations Governmental relations were first established the day after Namibia's independence, but relations with Namibian independence movements date back to the 1960s. China and Namibia have developed close economic relations, with trade increasing twofold between the two countries from 2003 to 2006. During a February 2007 visit, Chinese President Hu Jintao pledged Namibia "RMB 1 billion of concessional loans, 100 million US dollars of preferential export buyer's credit, RMB 30 million yuan of grants and RMB 30 million of interest-free loans...": China has an embassy in Windhoek.; Namibia has an embassy in Beijing.
India		See India–Namibia relations Relations began between SWAPO and the Indian government prior to independence. In 2010, relations were described by Indian officials as "warm and cordial". India has been involved in training the Namibian Air Force and bilateral trade in 2008–09 stood at $80 million.: India has a high commission in Windhoek.; Namibia has a high commission in New Delhi.
Indonesia		See Indonesia–Namibia relations: Indonesia has an embassy in Windhoek.; Namibia is accredited to Indonesia from its high commission in Kuala Lumpur, Malaysia.
Israel		See Israel–Namibia relations: Israel is accredited to Namibia from its Ministry of Foreign Affairs in Jerusalem.; Namibia is accredited to Israel from its embassy in Cairo, Egypt.
Japan		See Japan–Namibia relations Diplomatic relations between Japan and Namibia were established in March 1990.: Japan has an embassy in Windhoek.; Namibia has an embassy in Tokyo.
Malaysia		See Malaysia–Namibia relations Both countries were once part of the British Empire and before Namibia achieved its independence, Malaysia has contributed to some operations in Namibia by sending a group of soldiers to help monitor the Namibian elections and peace process. Today, the relations are much more focused in economic cooperation.: Malaysia has a high commission in Windhoek.; Namibia has a high commission in Kuala Lumpur.
Turkey	1966	See Namibia–Turkey relations: Namibia is accredited to Turkey from its embassy in Berlin, Germany.; Turkey has an embassy in Windhoek.; Trade volume between the two countries was US$11.84 million in 2019 (Namibian exports/imports: 2.44/9.40 million USD).

=== Europe ===
Country	Formal Relations Began	Notes
Finland		See Finland–Namibia relations Finland recognised Namibia on 21 March 1990. Both countries established diplomatic relations on the same day, and Namibia was represented in Finland through its embassy in Stockholm, Sweden. Since 2015 Namibia has an embassy in Helsinki. Finland has an embassy in Windhoek and an honorary consulate in Walvis Bay. Finland has stated it is a staunch supporter of Namibian independence. The Finnish Government has provided assistance in the sectors of forestry, water, environment and health. Namibia's exports to Finland increased from N$810 million in 2004 to over N$1 billion (approximately 90 million EUR) in 2007. In June 2008, Prime Minister of Namibia Nahas Angula visited Finland.: Finland has an embassy in Windhoek.; Namibia has an embassy in Helsinki.
Germany		See Germany–Namibia relations First contacts between people of the two countries took place when German missionaries were hired by the London Missionary Society to commence working in Southern Namibia during the late 18th and early 19th century. In the 1880s the German Empire came to what is now Namibia as a colonising power, creating German South-West Africa. The German colonial rule was marked by tensions and led to the genocide of the Herero and Nama people from 1904 to 1908, which resulted in the deaths of 65,000 Herero (80% of the total Herero population), and 10,000 Nama (50% of the total Nama population). The colony was ruled by Germany until 1915 when it was conquered by troops from the Union of South Africa. During South African rule, German was one of the three official languages of Namibia, the others being Afrikaans and English. Likewise during Apartheid rule, West Germany maintained a consulate in Windhoek despite United Nations resolutions calling for the isolation of South Africa. Namibian independence in 1990 coincided with German reunification, resulting in an initially slow development of diplomatic relations. However, in both 1989 and 2004 the German government acknowledged its responsibility for Namibia as a priority partner country. Since then German Development minister Heidemarie Wieczorek-Zeul visited Namibia, asking the country for forgiveness of the past.
North Macedonia		On 21 December 2011 North Macedonia and Namibia established diplomatic relations at ambassadorial level when the Ambassadors of both countries to the UN, Pajo Avirovic and Wilfried Emvula respectively, signed the joint communiqué. With the establishment of diplomatic relations, Namibia recognised Macedonia under its constitutional name the 'Republic of Macedonia' as opposed to its provisional name the 'former Yugoslav Republic of Macedonia'; in doing so Namibia became the 133 country to recognise Macedonia's constitutional name.: North Macedonia does not have an accreditation to Namibia.
Poland		See Namibia–Poland relations
Russia		See Namibia–Russia relations Relations between Namibia and Russia were considered "excellent" in 2006 by then-Namibian Minister of Education Nangolo Mbumba, while Russia expressed a desire for even stronger relations, particularly in the economic field. Also in 2006, the Namibia-Russia Intergovernmental Commission on Trade and Economic Cooperation was officially opened during a visit by Russian Natural Resources Minister Yuri Trutnev to Windhoek. During said visit, the Minister said Russia was interested in investing in oil, hydro-electric power and tourism. In 2007, Russian Prime Minister Mikhail Fradkov held discussions with Namibian Deputy Prime Minister Nahas Angula and President Hifikepunye Pohamba in regards to the possibility of developing Namibia's significant uranium deposits with an aim towards creating a nuclear power plant in the country. In 2008, Trutnev returned to Namibia, this time to Swakopmund, to meet at the third annual Intergovernmental Commission. Top foreign ministry official Marco Hausiku and his deputy Lempy Lucas represented Namibia in discussions with Trutnev.: Namibia has an embassy in Moscow.; Russia has an embassy in Windhoek.
Serbia	1990	Diplomatic relations between Namibia and Serbia were officially established in 1990. Serbia, then part of Yugoslavia, provided education, training, and financial support for SWAPO members during the entirety of the South African Border War, and the two countries have shared close relations ever since. During the NATO bombing of Yugoslavia in 1999, Namibia, which was then on the UN Security Council, voted with Russia and China for an immediate cessation of NATO attacks. Namibia also strongly supports the Serbian position on the Kosovo dispute.: Namibia is accredited to Serbia from its embassy in Vienna, Austria.; Serbia is accredited to Namibia from its embassy in Pretoria, South Africa.
Spain		See Namibia–Spain relations
Sweden		See Namibia–Sweden relations
United Kingdom	1990	See Namibia–United Kingdom relations Namibia established diplomatic relations with the United Kingdom in 1990.: Namibia maintains a high commission in London.; The United Kingdom is accredited to Namibia through its high commission in Windhoek.; Both countries share common membership of the Commonwealth, the International Criminal Court, and the World Trade Organization, as well as the SACUM–UK Economic Partnership Agreement.: Namibia has a high commission in London.; United Kingdom has a high commission in Windhoek.

=== Namibia and the Commonwealth of Nations ===
Namibia has been a Commonwealth republic since 1990, when South West Africa became independent of South Africa.

== See also ==
- List of diplomatic missions in Namibia
- List of diplomatic missions of Namibia

== Notes and references ==
- "Background Note: Namibia". US Department of State. Archived from the original on 21 October 2020.
