= Embassy of Indonesia, Windhoek =

Embassy of the Republic of Indonesia in Windhoek Kedutaan Besar Republik Indonesia di Windhoek

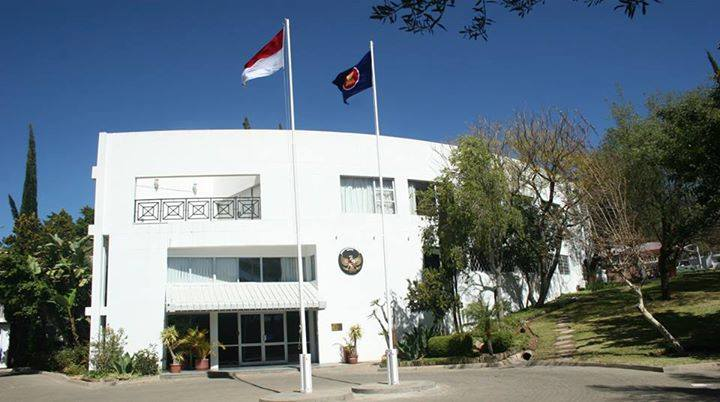
- Location: Windhoek, Namibia
- Address: 103 Nelson Mandela Avenue; Windhoek, Namibia
- Coordinates: 22.559470°S 17.09633°E
- Ambassador: H.E. Mirza Nurhidayat
- Jurisdiction: Namibia; Angola
- Website: kemlu.go.id/windhoek

The Embassy of the Republic of Indonesia in Windhoek (Indonesian: Kedutaan Besar Republik Indonesia di Windhoek) is the diplomatic mission of the Republic of Indonesia to the Republic of Namibia and concurrently accredited to the Republic of Angola. The embassy is located at 103 Nelson Mandela Avenue, Klein Windhoek, Windhoek. The first Indonesian ambassador to Namibia was Theofilus Waimuri (1999–2003). The current ambassador is Eddy Basuki, who was appointed by President Joko Widodo on 25 February 2016.

The chancery has been renovated twice. The first renovation in 1992 built a new room for the head of mission, a communications room, and a reception area. The new rooms were inaugurated by then Chargé d'affaires Soegioso Sosrosoemarso. A second renovation took place in 1999 where a new multi-function room named the Asia-Africa Room was built. The room was inaugurated by then Chargé d'affaires Theo Waimuri who would later become Indonesia's first ambassador to Namibia.

== See also ==
- Angola–Indonesia relations
- Indonesia–Namibia relations
- Diplomatic missions of Indonesia
