= Mexico–New Zealand relations =

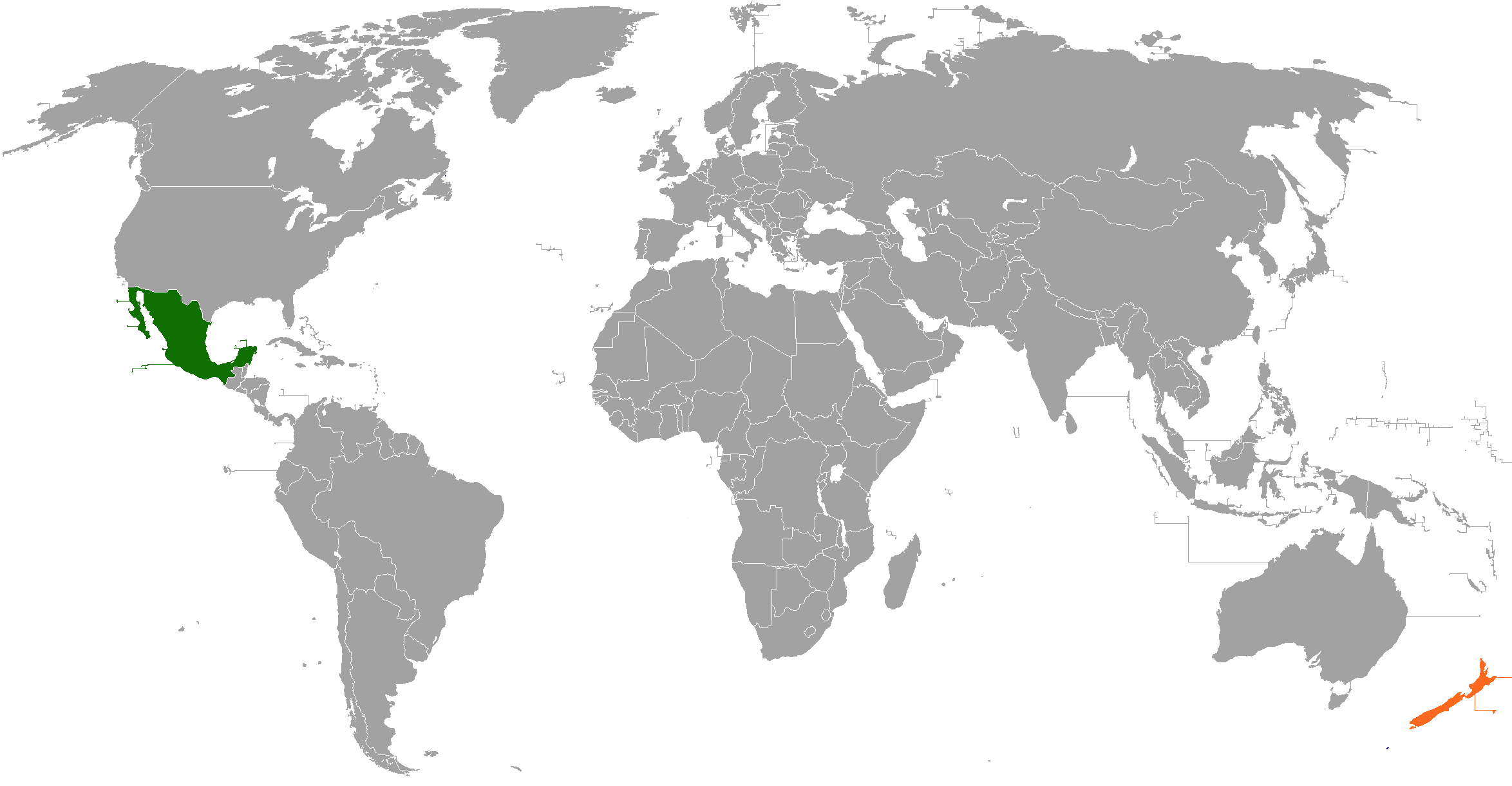

- Mexico: New Zealand

The nations of Mexico and New Zealand established diplomatic relations in 1973. Both nations are members of the Asia-Pacific Economic Cooperation, Comprehensive and Progressive Agreement for Trans-Pacific Partnership, Organisation for Economic Co-operation and Development, United Nations and the World Trade Organization.

== History ==
The earliest contact between Mexico and New Zealand may have occurred in the 16th or 17th century when Spanish ships carrying both Spanish and Mexican crew members between Acapulco, Mexico and Manila, Philippines sailed close to and may have shipwrecked in New Zealand.

Initially, relations between both nations were conducted via-London as New Zealand was part of the British Empire. During World War II both nations fought together in the Pacific War.

Diplomatic relations were officially established between both nations on 19 July 1973. In 1980, New Zealand Prime Minister Robert Muldoon became the first New Zealand head-of-government to visit Mexico.

In 1983, New Zealand opened an embassy in Mexico City. For its part, Mexico at first conducted diplomatic relations with New Zealand from its embassy in Canberra, Australia and operated honorary consulates in Auckland and Wellington. On 30 December 1991, Mexico opened an embassy in Wellington, which was attended by Mexican Foreign Undersecretary Andrés Rozental Gutman. In 1999, President Ernesto Zedillo became the first Mexican head-of-state to visit New Zealand.

In March 2013, New Zealand Prime Minister John Key traveled to Mexico and met with President Enrique Peña Nieto.

In November 2014, Mexican Foreign Secretary José Antonio Meade paid a visit to New Zealand and held a meeting with Foreign Minister Murray McCully. In 2017, New Zealand Trade Minister Todd McClay paid a visit to Mexico to meet with his counterpart, Ildefonso Guajardo Villarreal, regarding the Trans-Pacific Partnership. In August 2018, a Mexican Senatorial delegation visited New Zealand to strengthen trade and parliamentary ties between the two nations.

In 2023, both nations commemorated 50 years since the establishment of diplomatic relations. In 2026, New Zealand Foreign Deputy Secretary Victoria Hallum paid a visit to Mexico to attend the first Mexico–New Zealand High-Level Dialogue on Multilateral Affairs.

== High-level visits ==
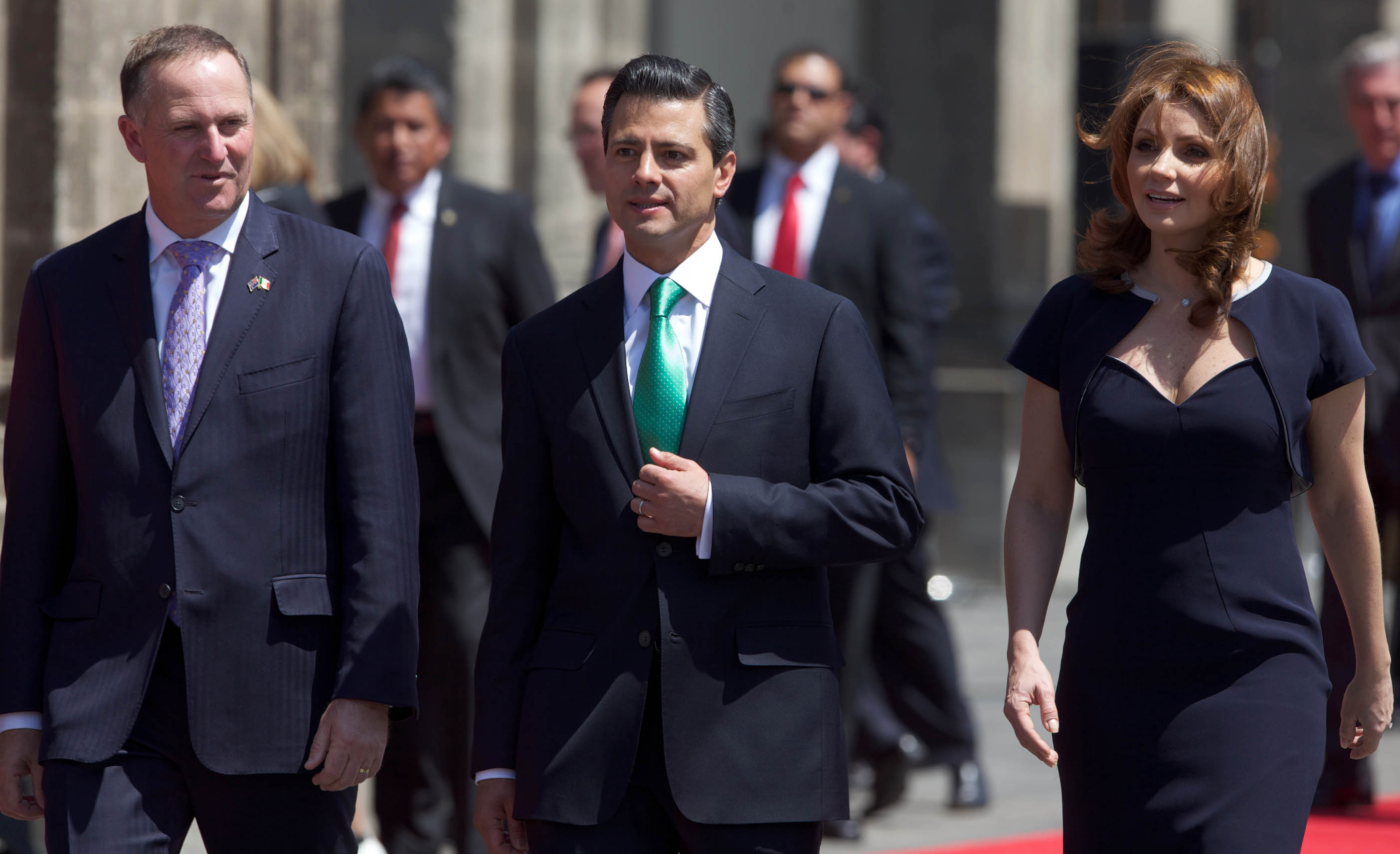
New Zealand Prime Minister John Key on an official visit to Mexico alongside Mexican President Enrique Peña Nieto; 2013.

High-level visits from Mexico to New Zealand

- Foreign Undersecretary Andrés Rozental Gutman (1991)
- President Ernesto Zedillo (1999)
- President Felipe Calderón (2007)
- Foreign Secretary José Antonio Meade (2014)
- Foreign Undersecretary Carlos de Icaza (2016)

High-level visits from New Zealand to Mexico

- Prime Minister Robert Muldoon (1980)
- Prime Minister Jim Bolger (1992)
- Prime Minister Jenny Shipley (1999)
- Prime Minister Helen Clark (2001, 2002)
- Prime Minister John Key (2013)
- Foreign Deputy Secretary for the Americas and Asia Andrea Smith (2014)
- Trade Minister Tim Groser (2015)
- Trade Minister Todd McClay (2017)
- Foreign Deputy Secretary Victoria Hallum (2026)

== Agreements ==
Both nations have signed numerous bilateral agreements such as an Agreement on Scientific and Technological Cooperation (1984); Agreement for Banks to Share Information (1992); Trade and investment agreement (1994); Air service Agreement (1999); Agreement to Avoid Double Taxation and Prevent Tax Evasion in the Matter of Income Taxes (2006); Agreement on a Working holiday visa (2007); Agreement on Agricultural and Forestry Cooperation (2008); and an Agreement of Cooperation in the field of Renewable Energy (2010).

== Trade ==
In 2012, New Zealand was granted observer status for the Pacific Alliance, a regional group that includes Chile, Colombia, Mexico and Peru. In 2018, both nations became signatories of the Comprehensive and Progressive Agreement for Trans-Pacific Partnership which grants both nations free trade with each other and other members of the Trans-Pacific Partnership.

In 2023, two-way trade between both nations amounted to US$717 million. Mexico's main exports to New Zealand include: motor vehicles for the transports of people and goods, telephones including mobile phones, data processing machines, tubes and pipes of iron or steel, chemical based products, milk and cream, fruits and vegetables, and alcohol. New Zealand's main exports to Mexico include: dairy based products such as butter, cheese, cream, and casein; meat, vegetable oil, agricultural machinery, transistors and similar semiconductors, flat-rolled products of iron or non-alloy, and wine.

== Resident diplomatic missions ==
- Mexico has an embassy in Wellington.
- New Zealand has an embassy in Mexico City.
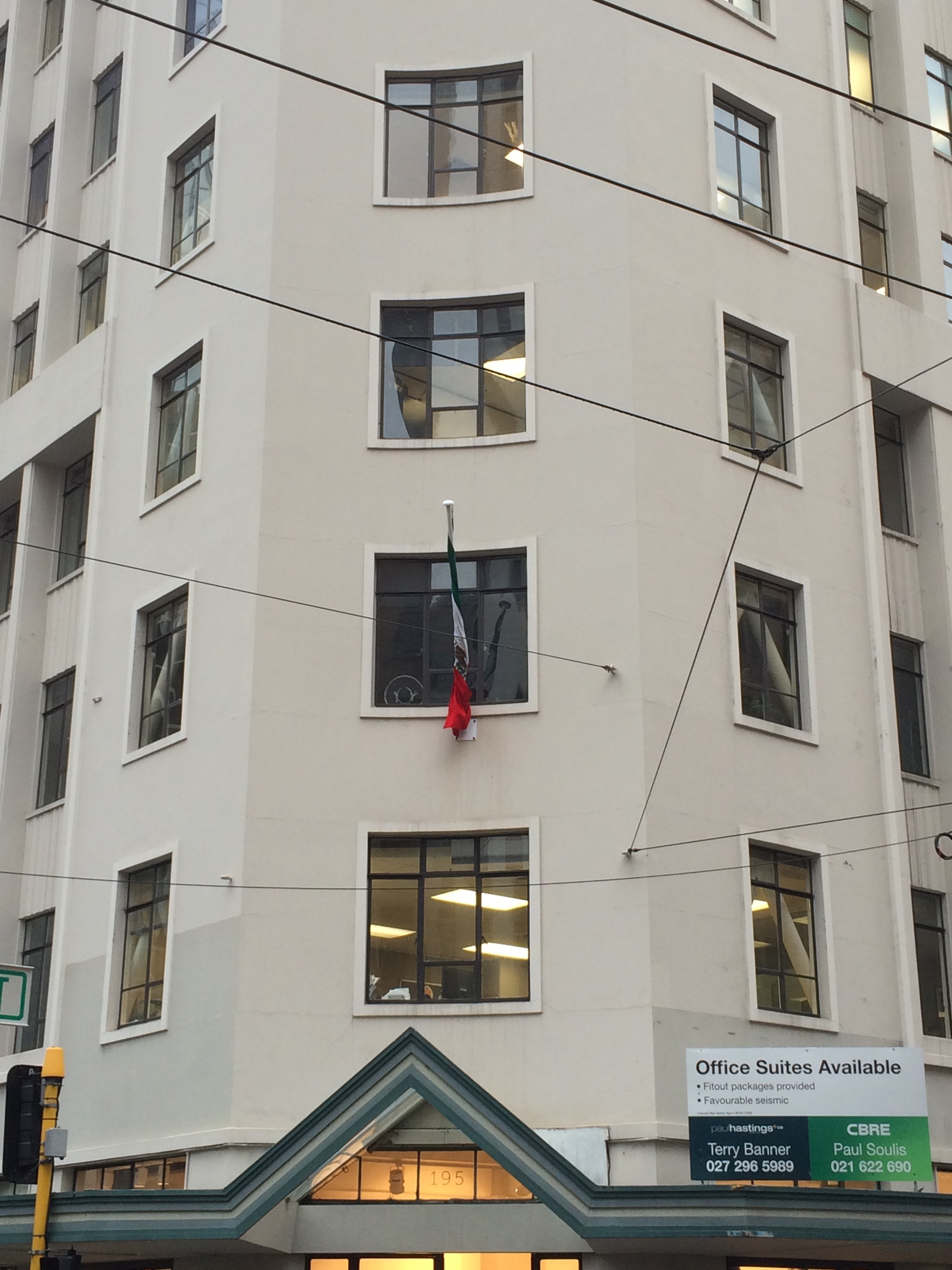
Embassy of Mexico in Wellington

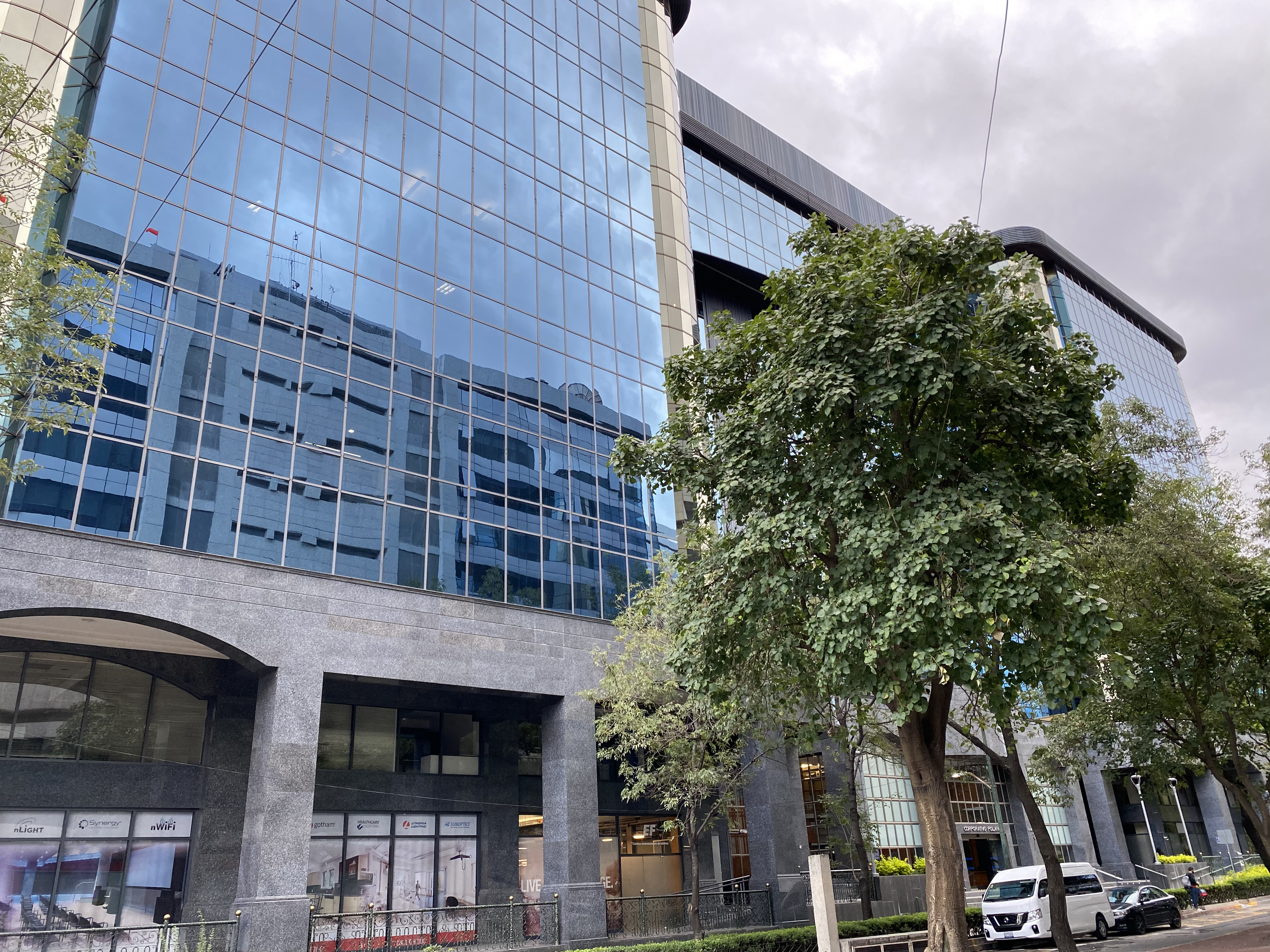
Building hosting the Embassy of New Zealand in Mexico City

== See also ==
- List of ambassadors of New Zealand to Mexico
