= Angola–Indonesia relations =

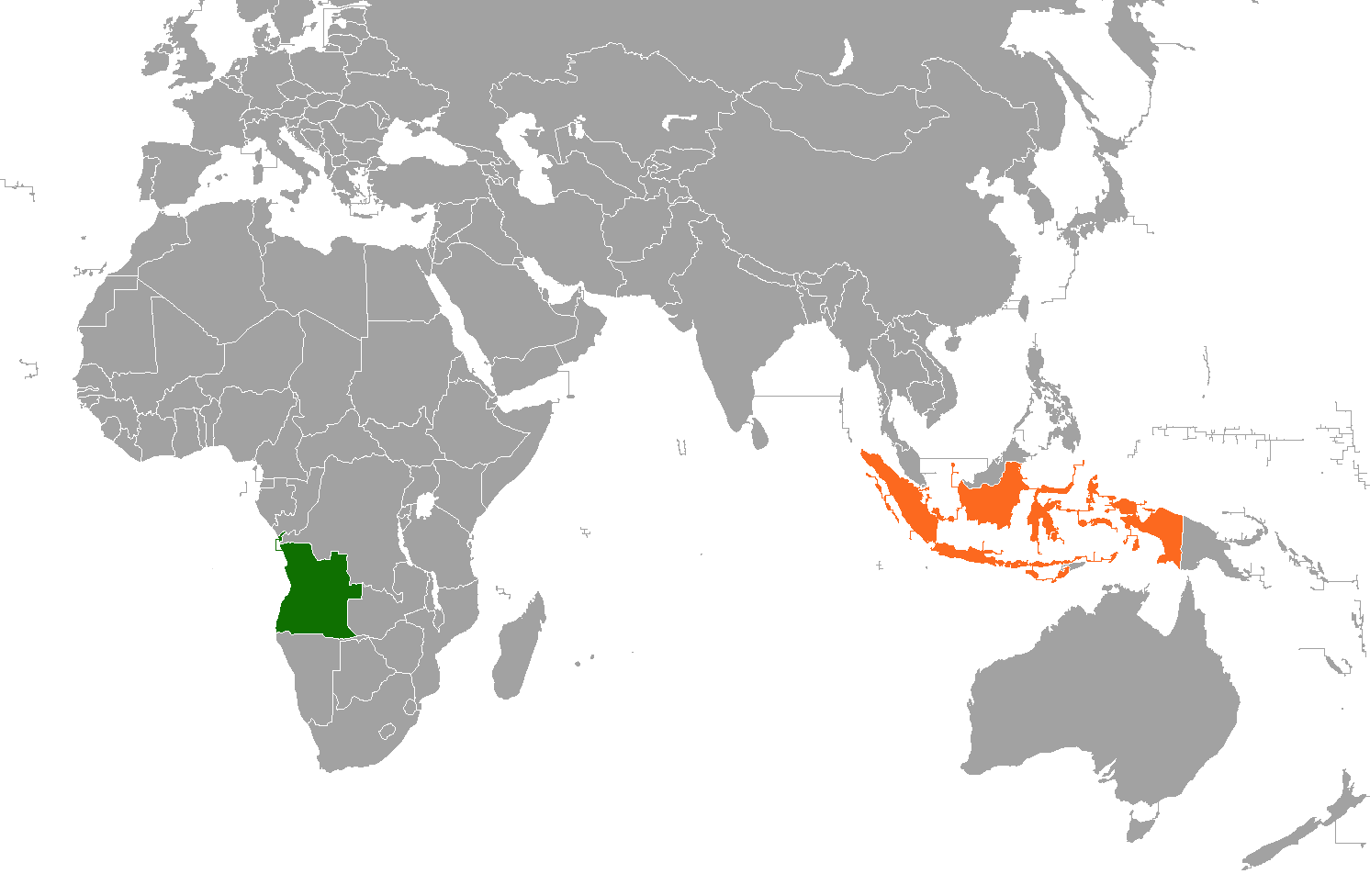
- Angola: Indonesia

Diplomatic mission
- Angolan Embassy, Jakarta: Indonesian Embassy in Windhoek

Angola–Indonesia relations are foreign relations between Angola and Indonesia. Both countries established diplomatic relations on 7 August 2001. Angola has an embassy in Jakarta since August 2023, which got inaugurated on 30 April 2025. Indonesia has an embassy in Windhoek, Namibia, that is also accredited to Angola.

== History ==
Angola and Indonesia share a common history of colonialism and struggle for independence. Both countries were part of the Non-Aligned Movement and supported each other's causes in international forums. Indonesia supported Angola's fight against apartheid South Africa and its territorial integrity against separatist movements. Angola supported Indonesia's sovereignty over East Timor and its territorial claims in the South China Sea.

H.E. Floréncio Mariano da Conceição e Almeida, Ambassador Extraordinary and Plenipotentiary of the Republic of Angola to Indonesia presented his credentials to H.E. President Joko Widodo on 8 December 2023.

On 30 April 2025, Indonesian deputy minister of foreign affairs Arrmanatha Nasir met bilaterally with Angolan secretary of state and deputy minister of foreign affairs Osvaldo Dos Santos Varela for administration, finance, and cultural heritage, at the Angolan Embassy in Jakarta. Angola was emphasized as a key partner in Africa and South–South cooperation throughout the meeting. Both sides reaffirmed their commitment to enhancing bilateral cooperation in a number of industries.

== Economic relations ==
Angola is Indonesia's third-largest trading partner in sub-Saharan Africa, after South Africa and Nigeria. The trade value between the two countries reached $290 million in 2016, with Indonesia exporting mainly palm oil, margarine, electronics, textiles, furniture, gloves, matches and paper, and importing mainly crude oil from Angola. However, the trade value decreased by 62 percent from 2015, due to the global economic slowdown and the drop in oil prices. Indonesia has suggested a preferential trade agreement with Angola to boost trade and investment.

Indonesia and Angola have also explored cooperation in various sectors, such as liquefied natural gas, strategic industry, agro-industry, capacity-building and technical assistance. Indonesia has offered its expertise and experience in palm oil cultivation and processing, as well as its state-owned enterprises' products and services, such as train carriages from INKA, arms from Pindad and aerospace from Dirgantara Indonesia.
