= Angola–Namibia relations =

- Angola: Namibia

Angola–Namibia relations refers to the bilateral diplomatic relations between Angola and Namibia. The border between the two countries is 1,427 km (887 mi) long.

Angola maintains an embassy in Windhoek and consulates-general in Oshakati and Rundu. Namibia maintains an embassy in Luanda and consulates-general in Menongue and Ondjiva.

== History ==
=== Pre-independence era in Namibia ===
Long before Namibian independence, the country's ruling party, the South West African People's Organisation (SWAPO), had a unique relationship with Angola. SWAPO and its militant wing, the People's Liberation Army of Namibia (PLAN) had emerged during the 1960s in response to South Africa's continued occupation of Namibia, which the United Nations had denounced as illegal. Beginning in 1965, PLAN frequently used Angolan territory to mount raids on South African military positions in Namibia. Over the course of the war, the fighting in Namibia would eventually drive at least 43,000 Namibian refugees into exile in Angola, many of whom joined PLAN.

Following Angolan independence in 1975, SWAPO established a formal alliance with Angola's new ruling party, the People's Movement for the Liberation of Angola (MPLA). After being expelled from Zambia between 1976 and 1979, PLAN was permitted by the MPLA to establish its regional headquarters inside Angola. Access to bases inside Angola provided PLAN with opportunities to train its forces in secure sanctuaries and infiltrate insurgents and supplies across Namibia's northern border. The MPLA government also permitted shipments of arms and ammunition destined for PLAN to pass through Angolan ports. South African troops frequently launched search and destroy operations along PLAN's external infiltration routes in Angola; they also sabotaged Angolan port and rail infrastructure being used to transport supplies to PLAN. This resulted in an effective state of war between South Africa and Angola which lasted until both nations, along with Cuba, signed the Tripartite Accord in 1989.

Under the terms of the Tripartite Accord, South Africa agreed to grant Namibia independence in exchange for a Cuban military withdrawal from Angola and an Angolan commitment to cease all aid to PLAN. Angola later cooperated with the United Nations in confining PLAN insurgents to their bases until they could be disarmed, demobilised, and returned home to participate in Namibia's first free and fair elections.

=== Post-independence era in Namibia ===
Following independence, Namibian-Angolan relations continued to be governed by security matters. In 1999, Namibia signed a mutual defence pact with Angola. Between 1999 and 2001, Namibia cooperated with the MPLA government by detaining suspected sympathisers of the National Union for the Total Independence of Angola (UNITA). Namibian troops were also deployed to Angola to assist in counter-insurgency operations against UNITA insurgents near the border. Namibia and Angola were both instrumental in an allied military intervention with Zimbabwe during the Second Congo War.

In 2001, there were about 30,000 Angolan refugees residing in Namibia. Many of them resided in the Osire refugee camp near Otjiwarongo. The overwhelming majority of the refugees were repatriated to Angola after the end of the Angolan Civil War in 2002.

Namibians were the only nationality who could access Angola visa-free until 30 November 2017 when citizens of South Africa and Mozambique were allowed visa-free access on 1 December 2017. Currently citizens of 11 countries can visit Angola visa-free.

== Economic relations ==
In 2016, Namibian exports to Angola amounted to US$99.6 million and Angolan exports to Namibia amounted to US$6.2 million.

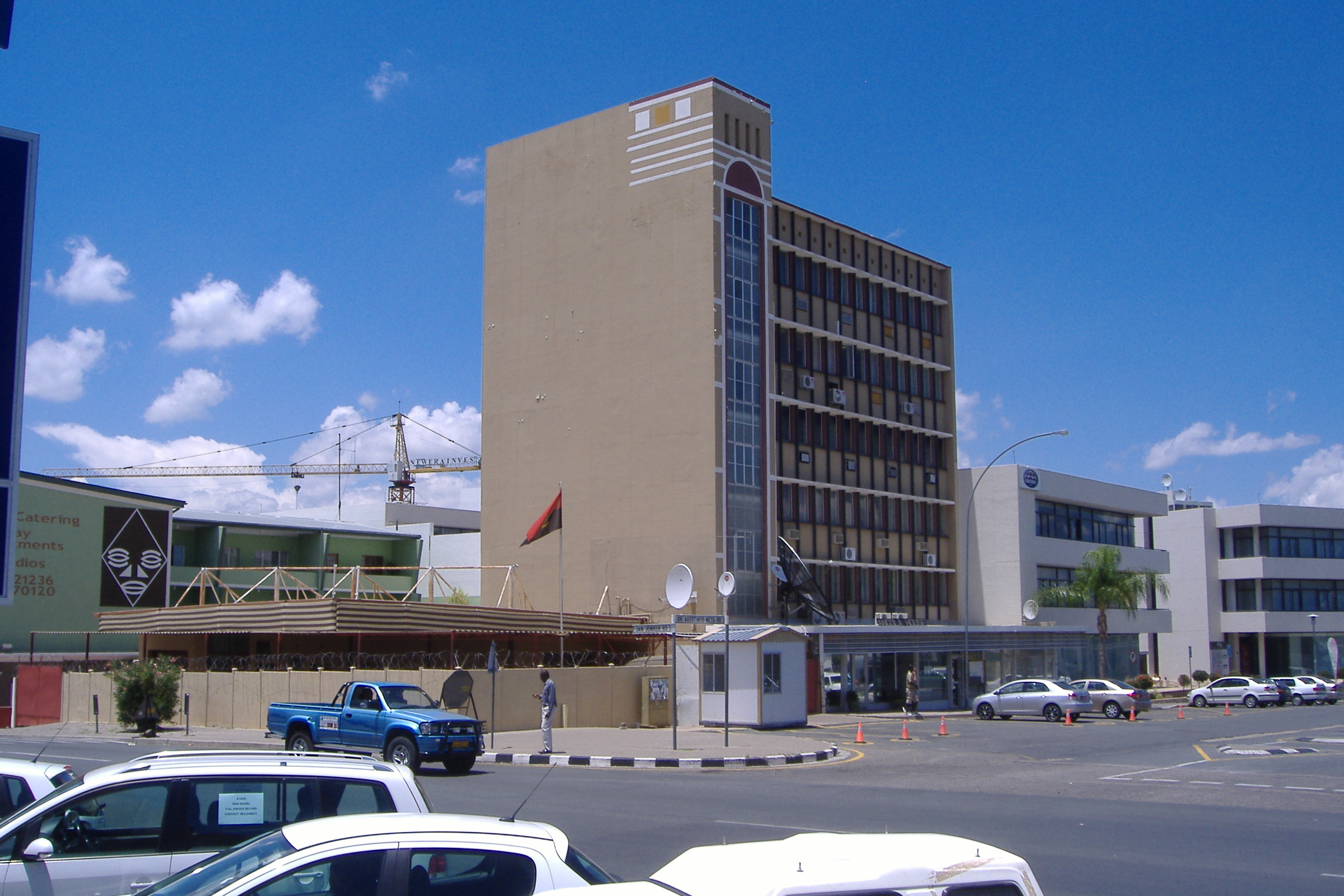
Embassy of Angola in Windhoek

== Resident diplomatic missions ==
- Angola has an embassy in Windhoek and consulates-general in Oshakati and Rundu.
- Namibia has an embassy in Luanda and consulates-general in Menongue and Ondjiva.

== See also ==
- Foreign relations of Angola
- Foreign relations of Namibia
