= Namibia–Turkey relations =

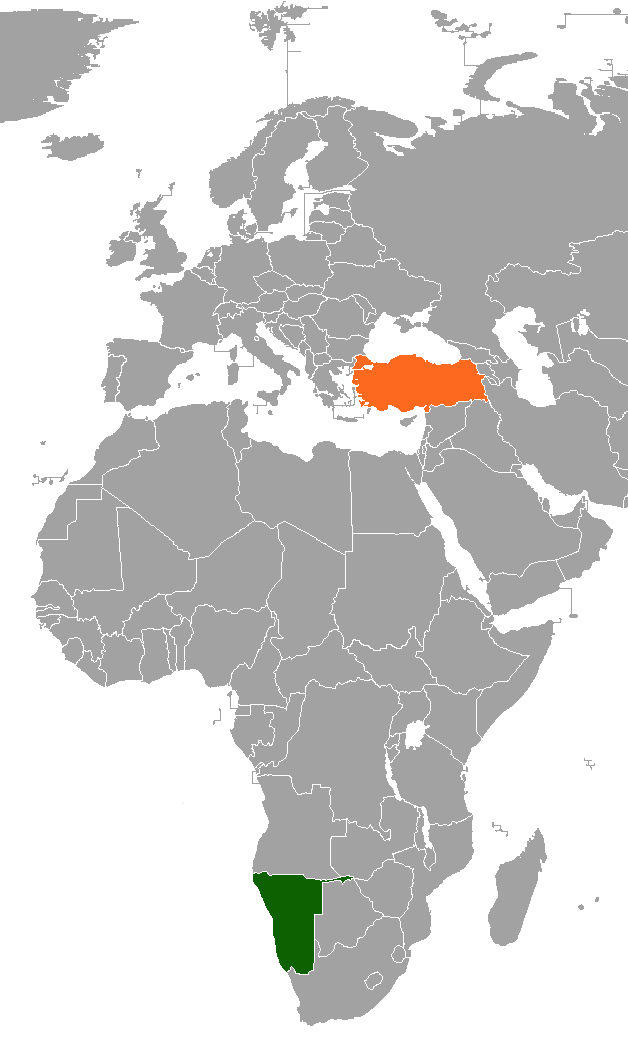
- Namibia: Turkey

Namibia–Turkey relations are the bilateral relations between Namibia and Turkey. Turkey has an embassy in Windhoek since January 4, 2012.

== Diplomatic relations ==
Namibia's struggle for independence from South Africa led to extensive Turkish diplomatic efforts as the co-sponsor from the Western Contact Group and founding member of the UN Council for Namibia, that called for Namibian independence.

Namibia — known as South West Africa before independence — was the last African colony. South West Africa had been a German colony that was granted to South Africa under a League of Nations mandate in 1920, following Germany’s defeat in World War I. The mandate forbade South Africa from annexing South West Africa but South Africa continued its rule even after UN General Assembly voted to revoke the League of Nations mandate on August 26, 1966.

Turkey continued to advocate on behalf of Namibia's independence but many countries baulked at supporting the country's movement under Sam Nujoma that allied with the Soviet Union and started sending young men to the Soviet Union for training in preparation for guerrilla warfare. Guerrilla warfare began 1966 but was marginal until Communist-led MPLA took over Angola in 1975. Nevertheless, South Africa succeeded in driving off the guerillas.

The diplomatic breakthrough came with the election of Jimmy Carter, who came to support the Western Contact Group and worked to negotiate peace in Namibia. In 1978, South Africa and Western Contact Group created a plan for holding elections that would lead to Namibian independence in 1990.

== Economic relations ==
Trade volume between the two countries was 11.8 million USD in 2018 (Turkish exports/imports: 9.40/2.44 million USD).

== Postage stamps ==
On August 26, 1975, Turkey issued a stamp titled "Namibia Day".

== Resident diplomatic missions ==
- Namibia is accredited to Turkey from its embassy in Berlin, Germany.
- Turkey has an embassy in Windhoek.

== See also ==
- Foreign relations of Namibia
- Foreign relations of Turkey
