= Namibia–Sweden relations =

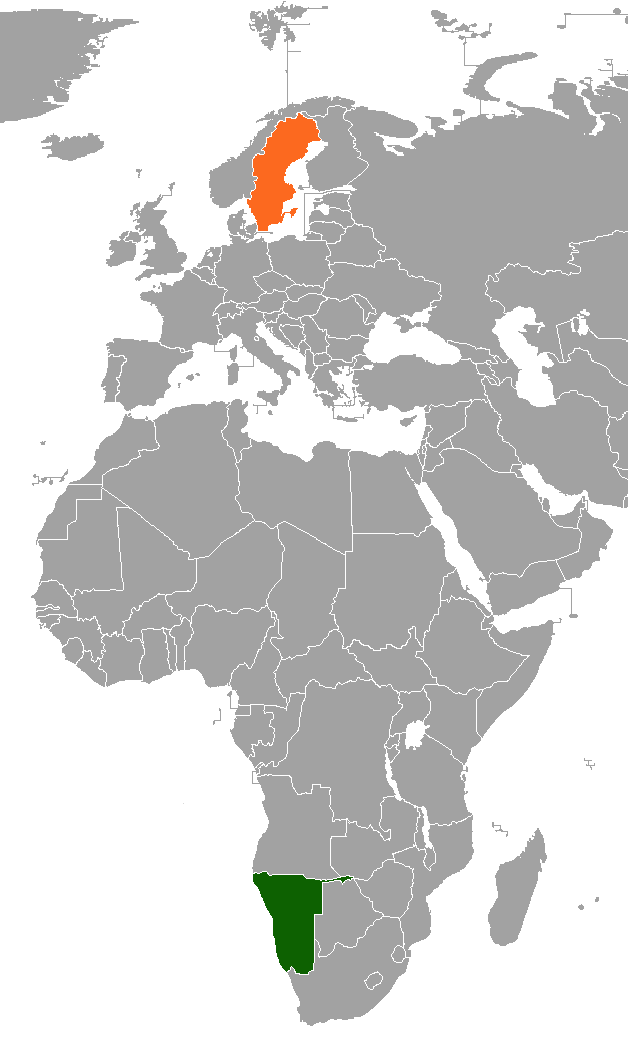
- Namibia: Sweden

Namibia–Sweden relations refers to the bilateral relations between Namibia and Sweden. Namibia maintains an embassy in Stockholm, while Sweden closed its embassy in Windhoek in 2008. Sweden was a strong supporter of the Namibian independence movement. From Namibia's independence in 1990 until 2007, Sweden was a primary donor of aid to develop Namibia's public sector but, in 2007, development aid began to be scaled back.

== Early contacts ==
The close relationship between Namibia and the Nordic countries can partly be explained by the fact that they share an overwhelmingly Lutheran population. Finnish missionaries conducted proselytism in Ovamboland from the 1870s and onwards. Economic links between Sweden and Namibia remained scarce, however. During the 1970s and 1980s, trade with Namibia never reached more than 0.003% of the total Swedish foreign trade.

Contacts between Sweden and SWANU began in the early 1960s, as Namibian students from SWANU obtained scholarships to study in Sweden. A close relationship was formed between the SWANU students and the Social Democratic Party.

== Support for Namibian independence ==
Contacts between Sweden and SWAPO began after the 1966 International Conference on South West Africa, held in Oxford. Representatives from all parliamentary parties from Sweden (except the Moderate Party) took part in the conference. In the same year two Swedish newspapers, Aftonbladet and Arbetet, initiated a fund-raising campaign for SWANU and SWAPO. Moreover, the National Union of South West African Students was founded in Uppsala in 1966, organized jointly by SWANU and SWAPO.

In 1969, the Swedish parliament voted to initiate official assistance to SWAPO. In 1971, SWAPO established a representation in Sweden, in charge of relations with the Nordic countries, West Germany and Austria.

SWAPO was the sole Namibian nationalist movement to receive official Swedish aid. However, Sweden did not subscribe to the UN General Assembly resolution of 1973 that declared SWAPO as the sole legitimate representative of the Namibian people. Rather, Swedish governments during the 1970s (both Social Democratic and non-socialist) described SWAPO as the leading force of the Namibian independence campaign.

Financial assistance to SWAPO was modest at first, but gradually increased (although temporarily suspended in 1972-1973). By 1976 Sweden was the largest SWAPO donor outside the Socialist Bloc. Financial aid to SWAPO was increased significantly under the Thorbjörn Fälldin government (in 1976 the annual contribution to SWAPO stood at 5.9 million Swedish krona, by 1979 the figure was 22 million). By February 1977 Hifikepunye Pohamba stated that Sweden was either the largest or second largest donor to SWAPO. Support for SWAPO from Swedish civil society, churches and trade unions was also significant.

Official Swedish assistance to SWAPO was of civilian nature. However, both the Social Democratic and non-socialist governments recognized the right of SWAPO to engage in armed resistance against South Africa.

== Culture ==
In 2009, the Legal Assistance Centre (LAC) in Namibia accused Sveriges Television, the national television station of Sweden, of exploiting ethnic minorities in Namibia in the TV show 'The Great Journey'. The show featured Swedish families living with the Himba ethnic group. The LAC said the show "permeated by a lack of respect," and "uses stereotypes reminiscent of colonial times in its marketing of the programme."

== See also ==
- Foreign relations of Namibia
- Foreign relations of Sweden
