= Malaysia–Namibia relations =

- Malaysia: Namibia

Malaysia–Namibia relations refers to bilateral relations between Malaysia and Namibia. Malaysia has a high commission in Windhoek, and Namibia has a high commission in Kuala Lumpur. Both countries are members of Commonwealth of Nations and the Group of 77.

== History ==
Both countries were once part of the British Empire. Before Namibia achieved its independence in 1990, Malaysia had contributed to some operations in Namibia by sending a group of soldiers to help monitor the Namibia elections and peace process. Today, the relations are much more focused on economic co-operation.

== Economic relations ==
During the Mahathir era, several agreements had been signed by both countries, such as the agreement on economic, science and technical co-operation. In 2006, the total trade between Malaysia and Namibia was worth around U$29 million, with exports valued at U$6.7 million and imports at U$22.3 million. Malaysia is also one of the major export partners for Namibia.

== Education relations ==
There are also opportunities for Namibian students to study in Malaysia, and Namibia is keen to learn from the Malaysian education system. Namibia and Malaysia also maintain academic collaborations in various fields, particularly between the computer science and educational psychology faculties.

== See also ==
- Foreign relations of Malaysia
- Foreign relations of Namibia
