= Namibia–Spain relations =

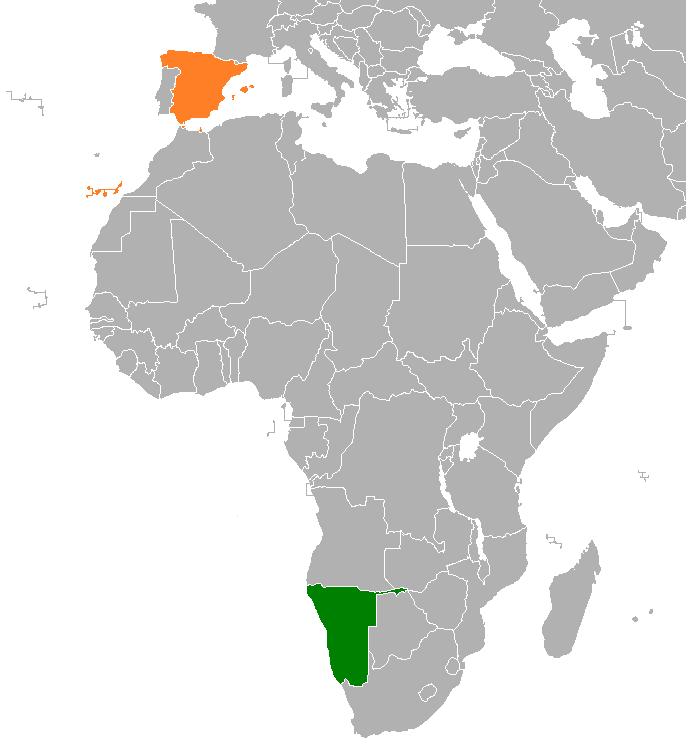
- Namibia: Spain

Namibia–Spain relations are the bilateral and diplomatic relations between these two countries. Namibia is accredited to Spain from its embassy in Paris, France. Spain has an embassy in Windhoek.

== Diplomatic relations ==
Formal diplomatic relations began in 1990, the year in which Spain opened an embassy in Windhoek, and they have been very good to date. Among the European Union countries, Namibian authorities look to Spain with special affection. Spain was part of UNTAG (UN operation responsible for ensuring the transition from a situation of colonialism and apartheid to the holding of free elections), sending a detachment of the Air Force and eight aircraft to Namibia.

Despite the years that have passed, this support has not been forgotten. The former president of SWAPO and Namibia, Sam Nujoma, visited Spain in 1996. King Juan Carlos I returned the visit in 1999. Since then, there have been several high-level visits, the last of which was made by the Namibian Minister Foreign Affairs to Spain in 2013.

== Economic relations ==
Traditionally, Spain's interest in the Namibian market focused almost exclusively on the exploitation of the African country's fisheries for which important investments were made in the sector. In recent years, however, there has been growing interest on the part of Spanish companies in different Namibian sectors: renewable energy, infrastructure, oil.

== Cooperation ==
The relations of cooperation for the development of Spain with Namibia began at the same time of the independence of the country with the opening of a Technical Cooperation Office (OTC) of the then AECI in Windhoek.

For many years, Namibia was a priority country for cooperation, but the IV Master Plan for Spanish Cooperation 2013-2016 included Namibia among the nine countries of Sub-Saharan Africa where it was planned to close or redesign the current program. As a result, the OTC in Windhoek closed its doors in August 2015.

The overall volume of official development assistance (ODA) received by Namibia fluctuated greatly in recent years. In the 1990s, after independence, the volume of foreign aid received doubled, with a rapid decline after the first years of the new millennium. Between 2007 and 2010 there was an uptick in ODA granted to the country, to decrease again considerably from 2011. During the period 2005-2012 the total net ODA of Spain in the country reached 72 million euros, mostly channeled to through bilateral programs of the Spanish Agency for International Development Cooperation (AECID) and the Ministry of Foreign Affairs and Cooperation (MAEC) (49 million) and contributions to multilateral organizations (10 million).

Despite the closure of the OTC, Spanish cooperation is still present in Namibia through the Spanish lecturer at University of Namibia and other regional (with the African Union and with the New Partnership for Africa's Development) and multilateral programs. Other institutions, such as the Centro Tecnológico del Mar (CETMAR) Foundation, maintain cooperation activities with Namibia

== Resident diplomatic missions ==
- Namibia is accredited to Spain from its embassy in Paris, France.
- Spain has an embassy in Windhoek.

== See also ==
- Foreign relations of Namibia
- Foreign relations of Spain
