= Finland–Namibia relations =

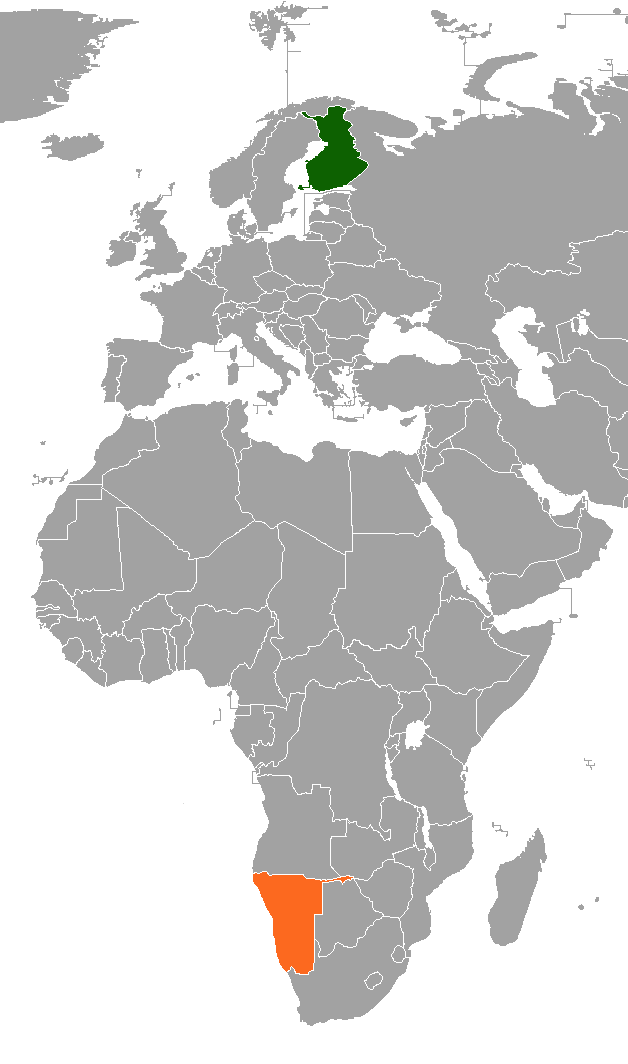
- Finland: Namibia

Finland–Namibia relations refers to the bilateral relationship of Finland and Namibia. Finland recognised Namibia on March 21, 1990. Both countries established diplomatic relations on the same day. Namibia has an embassy in Helsinki while Finland has an embassy in Windhoek and an honorary consulate in Walvis Bay.

== Diplomatic relations ==
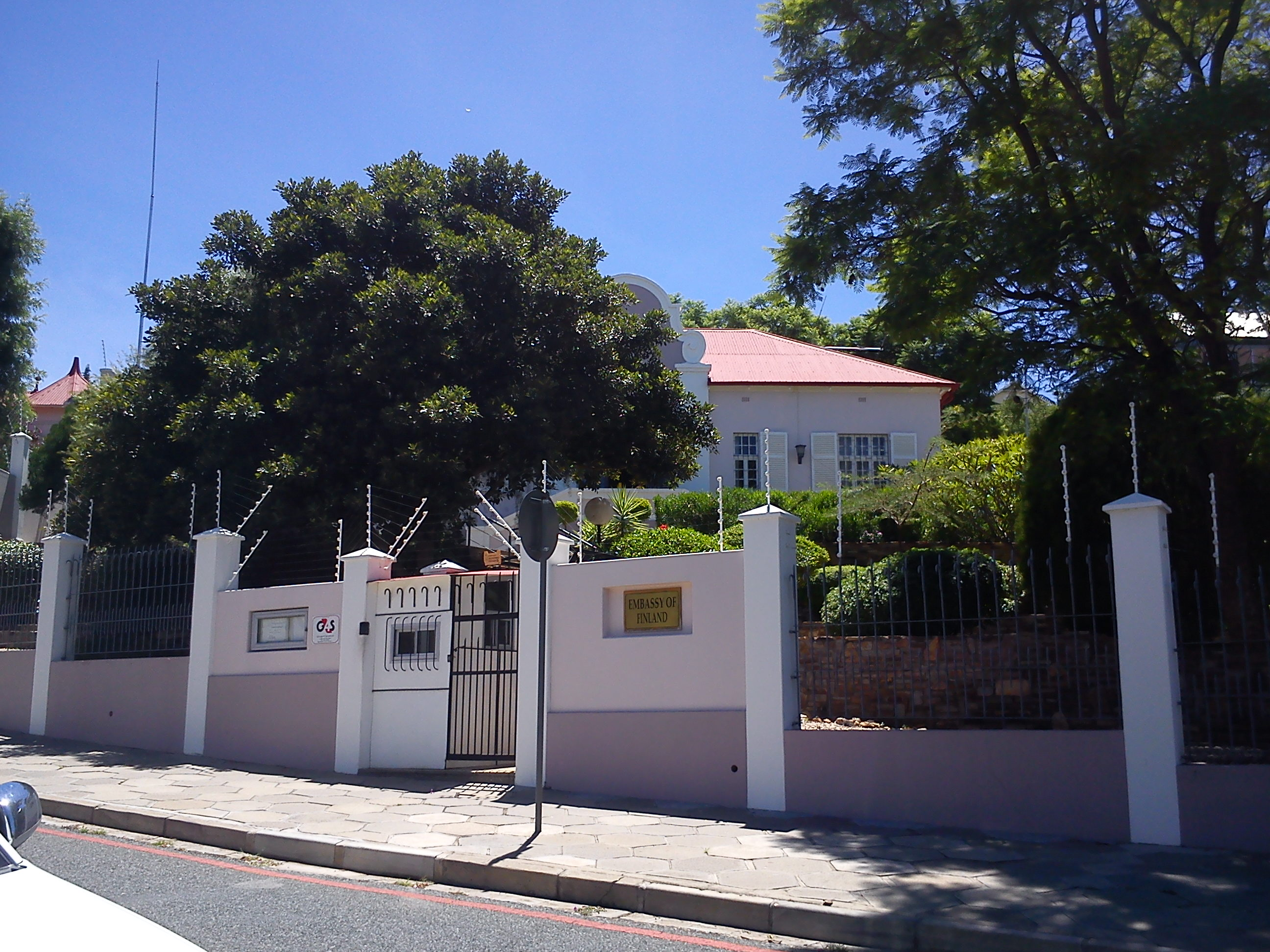
Embassy of Finland in Windhoek

Finland has stated it has been a staunch supporter of Namibian independence before Namibia achieved this.

== Finnish assistance ==
The Finnish Government has provided assistance in the sectors of forestry, water, environment and health.

== Trade ==
In general, trade between Namibia and Finland has been small. Namibia's exports to Finland increased from N$810 million in 2004 to over N$1 billion (approximately 90 million EUR) in 2007. However, a 2011 report showed that trade was even more limited. Finland's exports to Namibia valued €2.4 million, mainly consisting of paper and paper-products. Namibia's exports to Finland only valued €0.9 million, mainly consisting of meat and meat preparations. The Finnish Minister for European Affairs and Foreign Affairs, Alexander Stubb, together with a trade delegation paid a visit to South Africa and Namibia in November 2012. The aim was to promote business opportunities for Finnish companies.

== State visits ==
In June 2008, Prime Minister of Namibia Nahas Angula visited Finland. In February 2011, President of Finland Tarja Halonen visited Namibia.

In October 2023, President of Namibia Hage Geingob visited Finland to attend the State funeral of Martti Ahtisaari. In February 2024, President of Finland Sauli Niinistö visited Namibia to attend the State funeral of Hage Geingob.

== See also ==
- Martti Ahtisaari
- Foreign relations of Finland
- Foreign relations of Namibia
- Finnish Missionary Society
