= Mexico–Namibia relations =

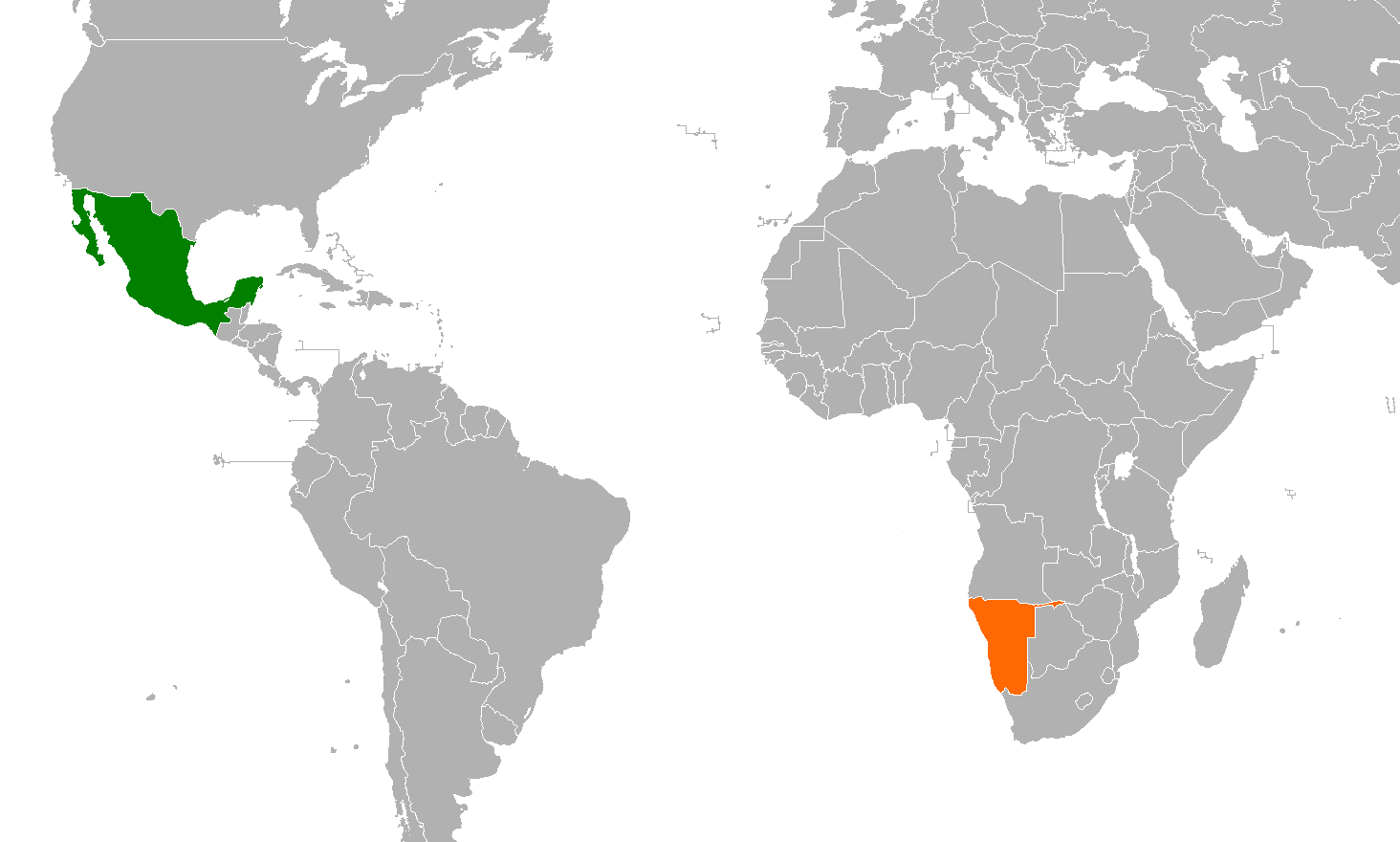

- Mexico: Namibia

Mexico and Namibia established diplomatic relations in 1990. Both nations are members of the United Nations.

== History ==
During the South African Border War, Namibia (at the time known as South West Africa) was fighting for its independence against South Africa which had occupied the country in 1915 from Germany. In 1972, Mexico joined as a member the United Nations Special Council for South West Africa and as a member, Mexico advocated for South African troops' withdraw from Namibia; supported Namibia's Independence from South Africa and officially recognized the South West Africa People's Organisation (SWAPO).

From 1980 to 1981, Mexico was a non-permanent member of the United Nations Security Council. While on the council, Mexico voted in favor of United Nations Security Council Resolution 475 condemning the continuing attacks on Angola by South Africa through occupied South West Africa. In 1985, during a UN meeting for Namibia in Vienna, Mexico called for full sanctions against the South African government.

In March 1990, Mexican Foreign Undersecretary Andrés Rozental Gutman traveled to Windhoek to attend the ceremony of Namibian Declaration of Independence which was delivered by Namibian President Sam Nujoma. Foreign Undersecretary Rozental conveyed a message to President Nujoma from Mexican President Carlos Salinas de Gortari, reiterating Mexico's desire to enter into diplomatic relations with the new Namibian government as soon as possible.

On 17 April 1990, Mexico and Namibia established diplomatic relations. In 1993, Mexico opened a resident embassy in Windhoek which it shared with Venezuela. In 2002, Mexico closed its embassy due to budget constraints.

In December 2010, Namibian Speaker of the National Assembly Theo-Ben Gurirab and Minister of Environment and Tourism Netumbo Nandi-Ndaitwah attended the 2010 United Nations Climate Change Conference held in Cancún, Mexico. In December 2017, Namibian Chairperson of the National Council Margaret Mensah-Williams paid an official visit to Mexico. During her visit, Mensah-Williams visited the Senate of Mexico and spoke to the chamber. In her message to the plenary session of the Senate, Mensah-Williams said that Namibia is against the construction of walls. She also invited Mexican companies to invest in Namibia in areas such as tourism and agriculture.

In 2024, both nations celebrated 34 years of diplomatic relations.

== High-level visits ==
High-level visits from Mexico to Namibia

- Foreign Undersecretary Andrés Rozental Gutman (1990)

High-level visits from Namibia to Mexico

- Speaker of the National Assembly Theo-Ben Gurirab (2010)
- Minister of Environment and Tourism Netumbo Nandi-Ndaitwah (2010)
- Minister of Environment and Tourism Uahekua Herunga (2014)
- Chairperson of the National Council Margaret Mensah-Williams (2017)

== Education ==
Since the establishment of diplomatic relations between both nations, the Mexican Secretariat of Foreign Affairs offers scholarships each year to students from Namibia, for specialty studies, masters, doctorates, postdoctoral stays and research at the master's level and doctorate.

== Trade ==
In 2023, trade between Mexico and Namibia totaled US$55 million. Mexico's main exports to Namibia include: chemical based products, tubes and pipes of iron or steel, tractors, yeasts, fish, machinery, and medical instruments. Namibia's main exports to Mexico include: electronic integrated circuits, parts and accessories for machines, data processing machines, diamonds, and fish.

== Diplomatic missions ==
- Mexico is accredited to Namibia from its embassy in Pretoria, South Africa.
- Namibia is accredited to Mexico from its embassy in Washington, D.C., United States and maintains an honorary consulate in Mexico City.

== See also ==
- Erindi Private Game Reserve
