= Japan–Namibia relations =

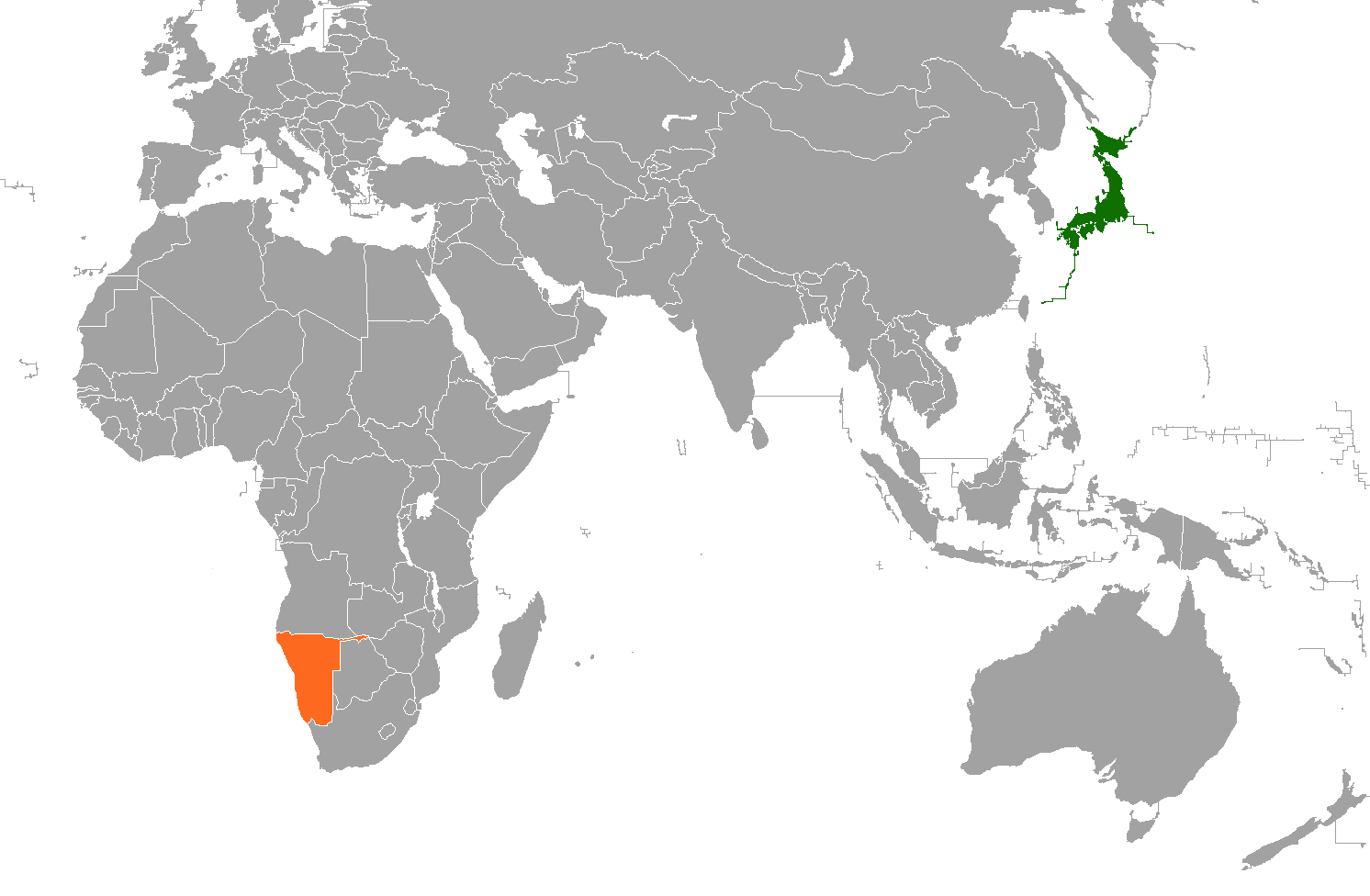
- Japan: Namibia

Japan–Namibia relations are the bilateral relationship between Japan and Namibia. Japan maintains an embassy in Windhoek and Namibia maintains an embassy in Tokyo.

== History ==
Diplomatic relations were established on 21 March 1990, the Independence Day of Namibia. In this year, the Ceremony of the Enthronement and the Great Thanksgiving Service were held at the Tokyo Imperial Palace, Namibian Minister of Foreign Affairs Theo-Ben Gurirab as the foreign representative attended with his wife.

On 25 August 2017, the Cabinet of Japan froze the assets of two Namibian firms who were trading with North Korea.

== Educational relations ==
The University of Namibia cooperates with two Japanese universities; Tokyo University of Marine Science and Technology and Kogakuin University.

== Resident diplomatic missions ==
- Japan has an embassy in Windhoek.
- Namibia has an embassy in Tokyo.

== See also ==
- Foreign relations of Japan
- Foreign relations of Namibia
