= List of ambassadors of New Zealand to Mexico =

New Zealand has maintained a resident ambassador in Mexico since 1983. The Ambassador to Mexico is concurrently accredited to Costa Rica, Cuba, Dominican Republic, El Salvador, Guatemala, Nicaragua, Panama and Venezuela. The embassy is located at Jaime Balmes 8, Polanco, Mexico City.

== List of heads of mission ==
=== Ambassadors to Mexico ===
==== Non-resident ambassadors, resident in the United States ====
- Lloyd White (1974–1978)
- Merwyn Norrish (1978–1980)
- Frank Gill (1980–1982)
- Lance Adams-Schneider (1982–1983)

==== Resident ambassadors ====
- Peter Fairfax (1983–1986)
- Rodney Denham (1986–1990)
- Bruce Middleton (1990–1993)
- Laurie Markes (1993–1997)
- Bronwen Chang (1997–2001)
- Paul Tipping (2001–2004)
- George Troup (2004–2007)
- Cecile Hillyer (2007–2011)
- Christine Bogle (2011–2013)
- Clare Kelly (2013–2017)
- Mark Sinclair (2017–2021)
- Sara Meymand (2021–)

==== Chargés d’affaires a.i. ====
- Lucy Duncan (2017)
- Andrew Townend (2020, 2021)

== See also ==
- Mexico–New Zealand relations
