= Namibia–Zimbabwe relations =

- Namibia: Zimbabwe

Namibia–Zimbabwe relations refer to the bilateral relationship between the Republic of Namibia and the Republic of Zimbabwe. Namibia and Zimbabwe are 511 feet (156 m) from each other at the closest, separated by Botswana and Zambia. This was previously thought to be the Kuzungula quadripoint.

== Zanu-PF-SWAPO relations ==
The ruling parties of Namibia (since independence in 1990) and Zimbabwe (since independence in 1980) have been close since pre-independence days, as both were anti-colonial movements against white-minority governments.

== Military ==
Namibia sent troops in the Namibia Defence Force to the Democratic Republic of the Congo alongside Zimbabwe in a SADC coalition to support the government of President Laurent Kabila in the late 1990s and early 2000s.
