= Namibia–Russia relations =

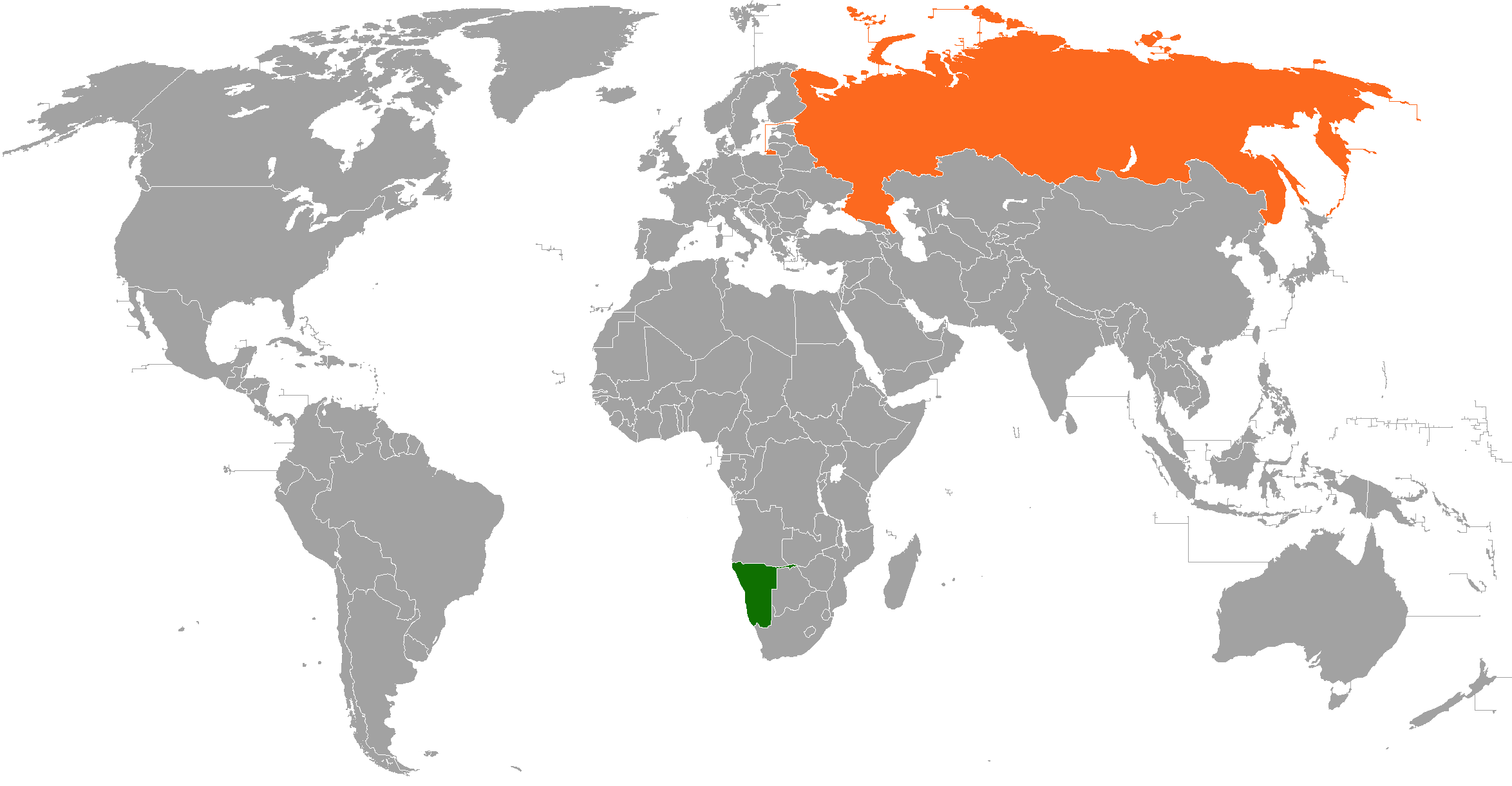
- Namibia: Russia

Namibia–Russia relations are the bilateral relations between Namibia and Russia. Namibia has an embassy in Moscow and Russia has an embassy in Windhoek. Monica Nashandi is the Namibian representative in Moscow, while Russia is represented in Windhoek by Nicolai Gribkov.

== Pre-independence ==
The Soviet Union gave significant amounts of aid to the People's Liberation Army of Namibia (PLAN) during the Namibian War of Independence. Many leaders of the SWAPO movement in Namibia received guerrilla training in the Soviet Union. With the end of South Africa's violently racist apartheid rule in Namibia in 1990, the Soviet Union and its successor state Russia established diplomatic relations with the country.

== Post-independence ==
Relations between Namibia and Russia were considered "excellent" in 2006 by Namibian minister of education Nangolo Mbumba, while Russia expressed a desire for even stronger relations, particularly in the economic field. Also in 2006, the Namibia-Russia Intergovernmental Commission on Trade and Economic Cooperation was officially opened during a visit by Russian Natural Resources Minister Yuri Trutnev to Windhoek. During said visit, the Minister said Russia was interested in investing in oil, hydro-electric power and tourism. In 2007, Russian prime minister Mikhail Fradkov held discussions with Namibian prime minister Nahas Angula and President Hifikepunye Pohamba in regards to the possibility of developing Namibia's significant uranium deposits with an aim towards creating a nuclear power plant in the country. In 2008, Trutnev returned to Namibia, this time to Swakopmund, to meet at the third annual Intergovernmental Commission. Top foreign ministry official Marco Hausiku and his deputy Lempy Lucas represented Namibia in discussions with Trutnev.

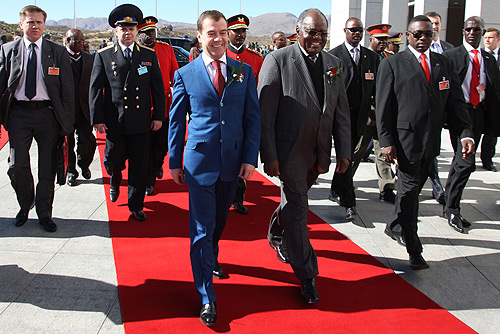
Namibian president Hifikepunye Pohamba greets Russian president Dmitry Medvedev in Windhoek on 25 June 2009.

In June 2009, during a four-day tour to five African countries, Dmitry Medvedev became the first Russian head of state to visit Namibia. Medvedev was accompanied by a delegation of around 400 Russian businessmen, including the heads of Gazprom and Alrosa. A number of energy-related agreements were signed during the visit.

Russia has drastically increased the bilateral aid it gives to Namibia, from $90,000 in 2012 to $1.5 million in 2017.

As of April 2024, Namibia has maintained close ties with the Russian Federation. At a ministerial level, [Sergey] "Lavrov expressed gratitude for Namibia's support for Russia's initiatives at the United Nations".

== Diplomatic staff ==
- Ndali Che Kamati, Namibia's ambassador to Russia (2010–?)
- Monica Nashandi, Namibia's ambassador to Russia (2025–)
- List of ambassadors of Russia to Namibia
