= Israel–Namibia relations =

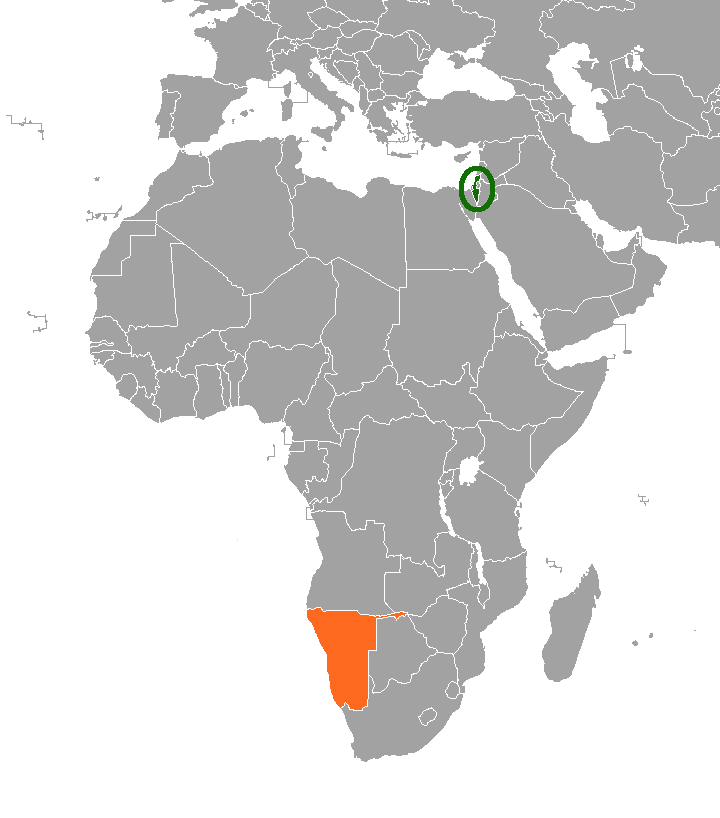
- Israel: Namibia

Israel–Namibia relations refers to the current and historical relationship between Israel and Namibia. Governmental relations were established in 1994, four years after Namibia gained independence from South Africa. Israel's ambassador to Namibia, Dov Segev-Steinberg, resides in South Africa. While Namibia does not have an embassy in Israel, it has an honorary consul, Gil Dankner, based in Atlit, Haifa.

== History ==
Prior to Namibian independence, Israel's policy towards Namibia was that of official silence. A number of high-profile Israeli leaders visited the then occupied territory. Members of the South African administration of Namibia also visited Israel.

- In late 1981, then Israeli Defense Minister Ariel Sharon visited the then South-West Africa, (the annexation of which by South Africa had not been recognized by the UN, which continued to refer to the territory as occupied Namibia) along with South African military officials. As part of Israel's military aid to South Africa, Israeli instructors helped train Angolan rebels, UNITA, in their fight against the MPLA-led government in Angola.
- In 1984, Israel's Ambassador to South Africa, Eliyahu Lankin, visited then South West Africa and pledged development aid to South African officials.
- In April 1985, the Windhoek Observer reported that South African governmental and developmental officials in charge of administering Namibia would visit Israel to study development projects.

Namibia gained independence in 1990 and the two governments opened bilateral relations in 1994.

In January 2008, Prime Minister of Namibia Nahas Angula received a fax that claimed to be from the United States House of Representatives. It asked Namibia to vote more favorably for Israel at the United Nations. The United States embassy in Namibia would neither confirm nor deny the authenticity of the letter.

In January 2009, during the Gaza War, Namibia condemned Israel, saying, "This naked aggression and disproportionate use of force by Israel is unfortunate and only leads to further escalation of violence". Namibia recognises the State of Palestine.

== Economic relations ==
Israeli companies are heavily invested in Namibia's diamond industry. In 2004, Africa Israel Investments through subsidiary LLD Diamonds, was given 36 concessions worth US$ 180 million by the Namibian government in order to invest in Namibia's diamond industry. As of 2005, LLD Diamonds operated the largest diamond cutting center in Africa. Based in Windhoek, Namibian President Hifikepunye Pohamba called the factory a success story in Namibia's drive to attract Foreign Direct Investment.

In January 2008, a chartered Cessna 210 crashed shortly after takeoff from an airport in Windhoek. The plane, heading to Etosha National Park, killed five Israelis and four Namibians. The Israelis were expatriates working in the diamond industry heading to Etosha for a holiday break, while the Namibians were members of the crew flying the group.

== Criticism of relations ==
Some organizations in Namibia called for an end to relations with Israel due to the Israeli–Palestinian conflict. The National Society for Human Rights of Namibia called for the ending of relations in 2002 due to "the persistent denial, by the State of Israel, of the inalienable right to self-determination for the people of Palestine". During the 2008–09 Gaza War, opposition parties SWANU and the Namibian Democratic Movement for Change called for the severing of relations.

A number of op-eds were written criticizing Israel and Namibia's relationship with it. In January 2008, Alexactus Kaure, a Namibian academic and writer, wrote an op-ed piece published in the state-run New Era newspaper which criticized Namibia's relations with Israel, calling them controversial and comparing them to relations with apartheid South Africa. A year later during the Gaza War, Herbert Jauch, head of research and education at Namibia's Labour Resource and Research Institute published an op-ed in the New Era calling Israel's actions "...an act of cold-blooded murder and a crime against humanity", while calling for the international isolation of Israel.

== See also ==
- History of the Jews in Namibia
- List of diplomatic missions of Israel
- List of diplomatic missions of Namibia
