= Namibia–Poland relations =

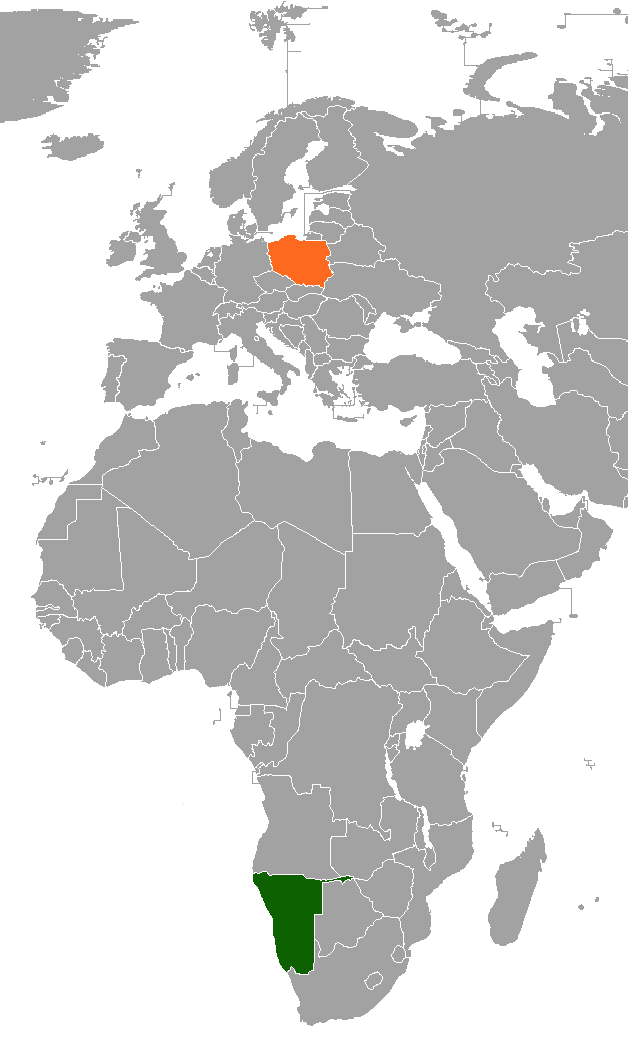
- Namibia: Poland

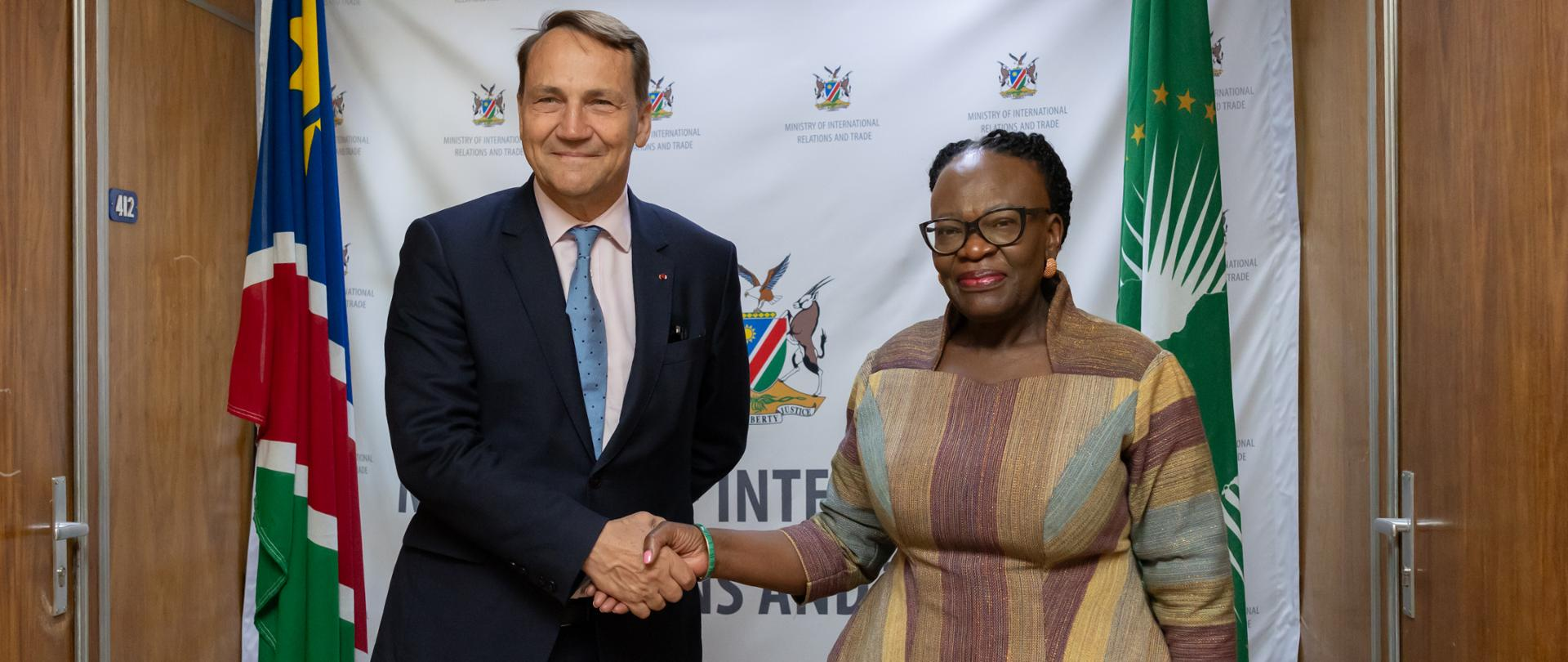
Ministers of foreign affairs, Radosław Sikorski and Selma Ashipala-Musavyi (2026)

Namibia–Poland relations are bilateral relations between Namibia and Poland. Both nations enjoy historically good relations, once centered on Polish support for the Namibian struggle for independence and now focused on economic, educational and political cooperation. Both nations are full members of the World Trade Organization and the United Nations.

== History ==
In 1905, the Polish press condemned the ongoing genocide of the Herero people in German South West Africa (now Namibia) by the German Empire.

Poland supported the Namibian struggle for independence. Poland provided treatment and professional training to SWAPO partisans. Students from Namibia studied social work in Poland. Libertina Amathila attended and graduated the Medical University of Warsaw in Poland, becoming the first Namibian female physician, and later also Deputy-Prime Minister of independent Namibia. Sam Nujoma, leader of SWAPO and future first President of Namibia, visited Poland in 1977 and 1981. A Polish military contingent participated in the United Nations Transition Assistance Group peacekeeping mission in Namibia from April 1989 to March 1990. The Polish contingent was stationed in Grootfontein and Windhoek and oversaw an area of about 320,000 square kilometres (123,553 sq mi), one of the most densely populated in Namibia. On 21 March 1990, Namibia finally proclaimed independence, which was recognized by Poland on the same day, and diplomatic relations were also established on that day.

== Modern relations ==
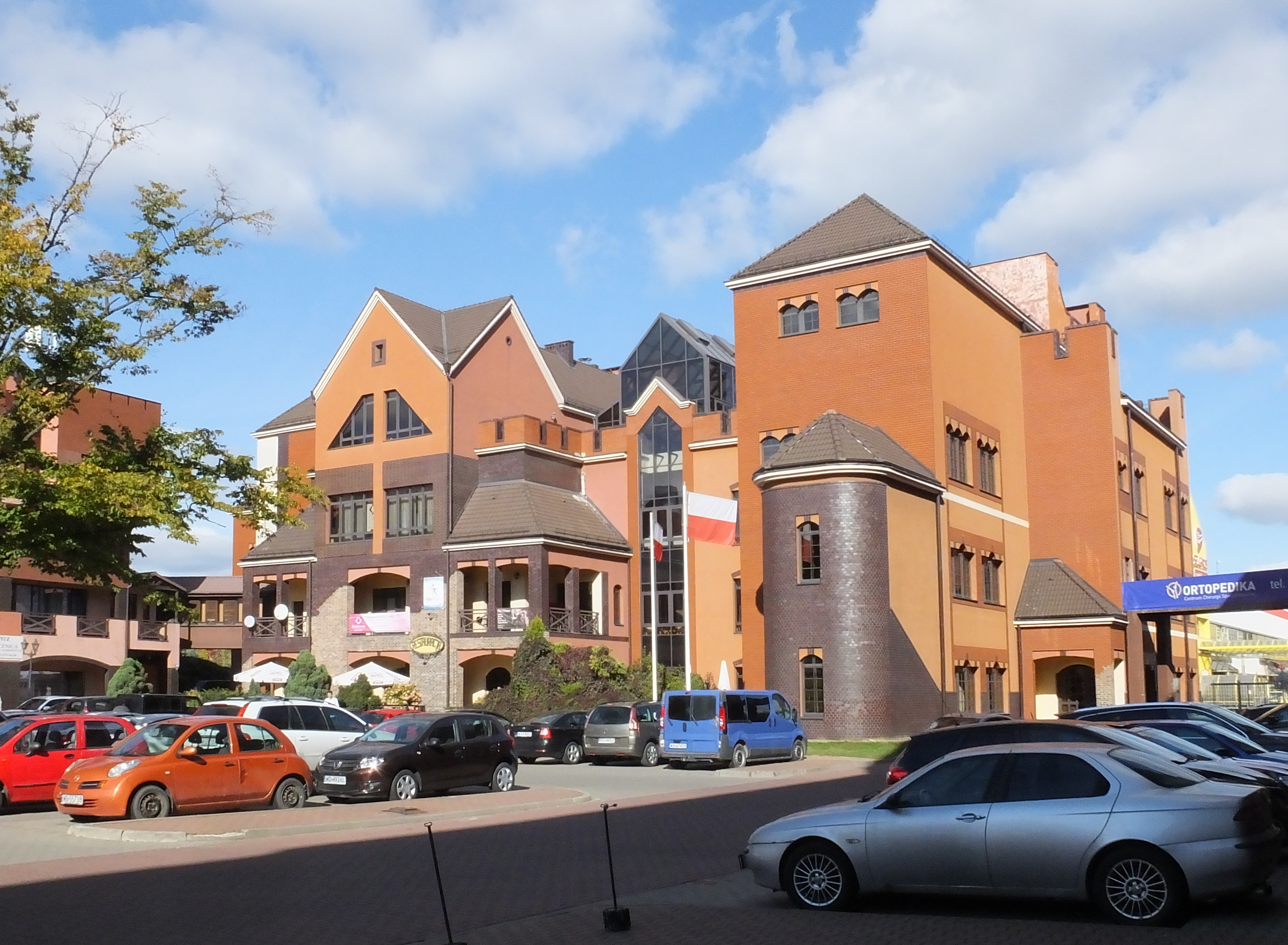
Building hosting the Honorary Consulate of Namibia in Warsaw

Polish Professor Grzegorz Kopij, an ornithologist from the Wrocław University of Environmental and Life Sciences, was the head of Namibia's first wildlife department at the University of Namibia in Windhoek.

In 2022, during a visit in Namibia, Deputy Foreign Minister Paweł Jabłoński declared Poland's support for Namibian efforts to seek reparations from Germany for the Herero and Namaqua genocide of 1904–1908. In 2023, Uria Nandiuasora Mazeingo, chairman of the Ovaherero Genocide Foundation, and David Hanse, chief of the ǃKharakhoen Nama clan, were guests at a convention in Warsaw alongside Polish and Greek representatives to discuss efforts to seek war reparations from Germany for the crimes it committed in Namibia, Poland and Greece.

As part of a partnership between the Polish municipality of Czerwonak and the Namibian city of Walvis Bay, the public space along the beach in Walvis Bay was renovated in 2025.

== Diplomatic missions ==
- Namibia is accredited to Poland from its embassy in Berlin, and there is an honorary consulate of Namibia in Warsaw.
- Poland is accredited to Namibia from its embassy in Pretoria.
