= Indonesia–Namibia relations =

- Indonesia: Namibia

Indonesia and Namibia established diplomatic relations on 13 May 1991. However, the relations between the two countries started earlier. Since the Asian-African Conference in 1955, Indonesia was an active promoter of decolonization of Asian and African nations, and was working together with SWAPO in the UN forum to support Namibia's independence. Today, Indonesia and Namibia are keen to increase their economic and trade relations. Indonesia has an embassy in Windhoek, while Namibian embassy in Kuala Lumpur is also accredited to Indonesia.

== Cooperation ==
Both countries have been working together in various sectors, especially in agriculture, technical assistance and education. Namibia has been actively participating in various training programmes and scholarships in Indonesia, including micro-finance, aquaculture and agriculture. On higher learning program, the University of Namibia (UNAM) and the University of Gadjah Mada (UGM) has agreed to invite several senior academicians from UGM to work for UNAM to help develop newly established faculties.

== Trade and investment ==
The bilateral trade volume between Indonesia and Namibia reached US$26.25 million in 2008, a 145% increase compared to 2007 that only reached US$10.70 million. Indonesian exports to Namibia includes soap, detergent, lubricants, lamps and cosmetics.

== See also ==
- Foreign relations of Indonesia
- Foreign relations of Namibia
