= Andrés Rozental Gutman =

Mexican diplomat

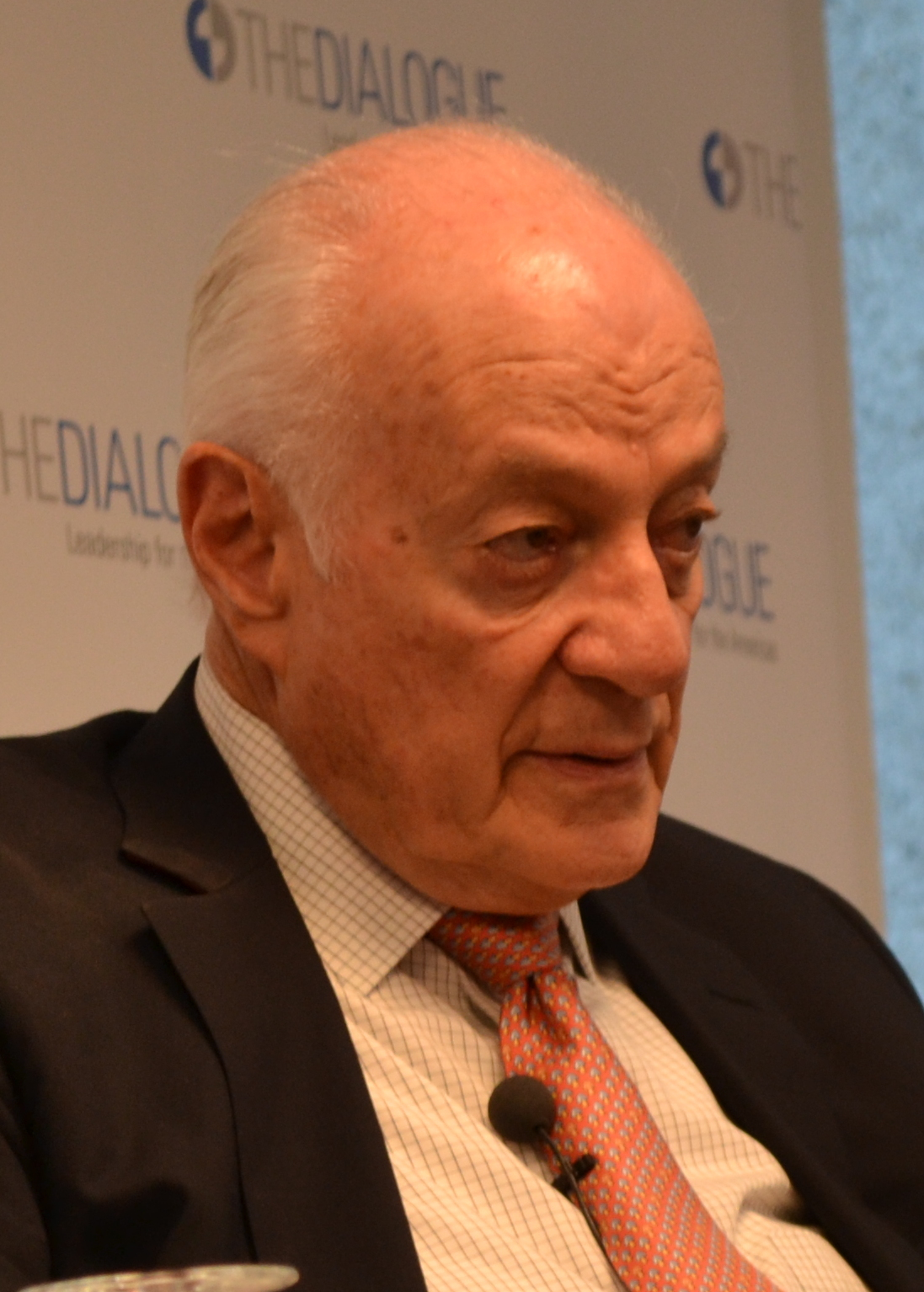
- Born: April 1945 (age 81); Mexico City
- Education: Universidad de las Américas (BS); University of Pennsylvania (MS)

Ambassador Andrés Rozental (born 1945) OBE (Hon.) OQ (Hon.) is a former Mexico's ambassador to the United Kingdom from 1995 to 1997. He was the Deputy Minister of Foreign Relations from 1988 to 1994, Ambassador to Sweden from 1983 to 1988 and the Permanent Representative of Mexico to the United Nations in Geneva from 1982 to 1983. In 1997 he retired early from public service and founded a consultancy firm named Rozental & Asociados in Mexico City and London. He is a member of the board of HSBC Mexico, member of the bank's Audit and Risk Committee and chairs the Remuneration Committee. He is also on the Boards of Ocean Wilsons and Wilson, Sons in Brazil. Through his consultancy, Rozental advises multinational companies on their corporate strategies in Mexico and Latin America. He obtained his degree in international relations from the Universidad de las Américas in Mexico, and his masters in international economics from the University of Pennsylvania. Ambassador Rozental was the founding President of the Mexican Council on a Foreign Relations and is a Senior Policy Advisor to Chatham House in London. Also, he is a member of Council at the International Institute on Strategic Strategies and is on the Trilateral Commission. Rozental is a member of the Inter-American Dialogue.
