= List of ambassadors of Namibia to the United States =

Coordinates: 38.911667°N 77.041111°W

Ambassador of Namibia to United States Embassy of Namibia in Washington, D.C.
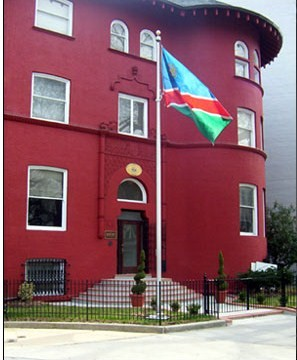
- Incumbent; Margaret Mensah-Williams since December 10, 2020
- Inaugural holder: Hinyangerwa Pius Asheeke
- Formation: August 11, 1990

The Namibian ambassador in Washington, D.C. is the official representative of the Government in Windhoek to the government of the United States. The two countries established diplomatic relations on 21 March 1990, the day of independence of Namibia.

== List of representatives ==
Date designated	Diplomatic agrément/Diplomatic accreditation	Ambassador	Observations	President of Namibia	President of the United States	Term end
August 11, 1990		Hinyangerwa Pius Asheeke	Resided in New York and asked on an exceptional basis not to be accredited as an Ambassador but as a Charge d'Affaires.	Sam Nujoma	George H. W. Bush	
October 10, 1990		Hinyangerwa Pius Asheeke	Born November 30, 1952, formerly ambassador at the Namibian embassy in Germany (1996 to 2003), co-accredited as non-resident ambassador to Austria (from 23.07.1997).	Sam Nujoma	George H. W. Bush	
August 8, 1991	September 5, 1991	Tuliameni Kalomoh		Sam Nujoma	George H. W. Bush	
August 28, 1996	October 9, 1996	Veiccoh Nghiwete	Later High Commissioner to the Republic of South Africa (16 December 2015)	Sam Nujoma	Bill Clinton	
April 1, 1999	April 19, 1999	Leonard Nangolo Iipumbu		Sam Nujoma	Bill Clinton	
March 4, 2005	March 8, 2005	Hopelong Ushona Ipinge	Formerly Namibian Ambassador to China (April 16, 1999 to January 29, 2005) and Namibian Ambassador to Brazil (November 7, 2006 to September 8, 2010)	Hifikepunye Pohamba	George W. Bush	
August 15, 2006	September 12, 2006	Patrick Nandago	Previously Chief of Protocol of the Namibian government (until 2004), and from June 18, 2004, the Namibian Ambassador to Brazil.	Hifikepunye Pohamba	George W. Bush	
September 3, 2010	September 16, 2010	Martin Andjaba		Hifikepunye Pohamba	Barack Obama; Donald Trump	April 2018
		Monica Nashandi		Hage Geingob	Donald Trump	December 10, 2020
December 10, 2020		Margaret Mensah-Williams		Hage Geingob	Donald Trump	

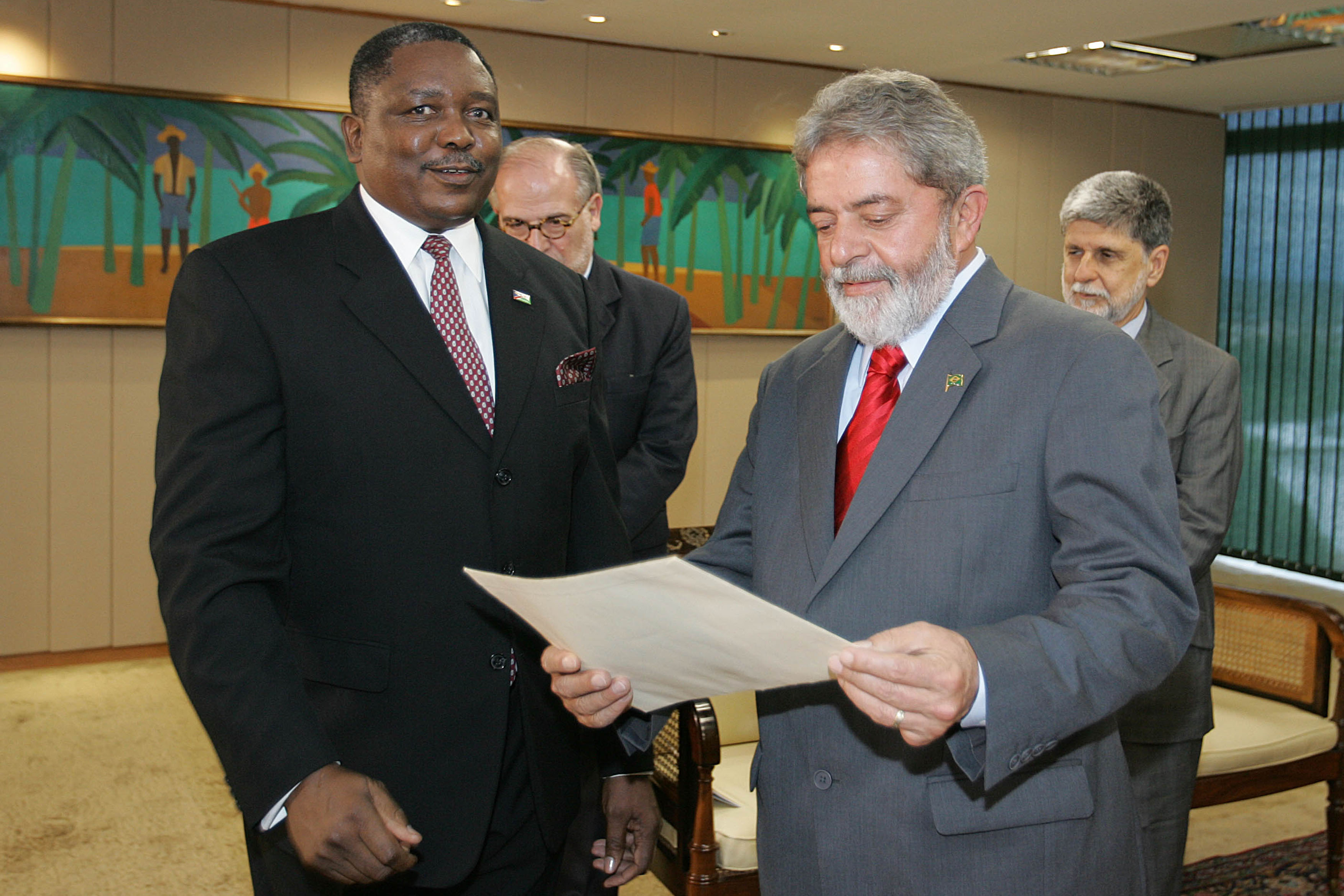
Hopelong Ushona Ipinge (left) with Luiz Inácio Lula da Silva at the Palácio do Planalto, Brasília in 2006
