= Parliament Gardens =

Park in downtown Windhoek, Namibia

Coordinates: 22.567°S 17.088°E

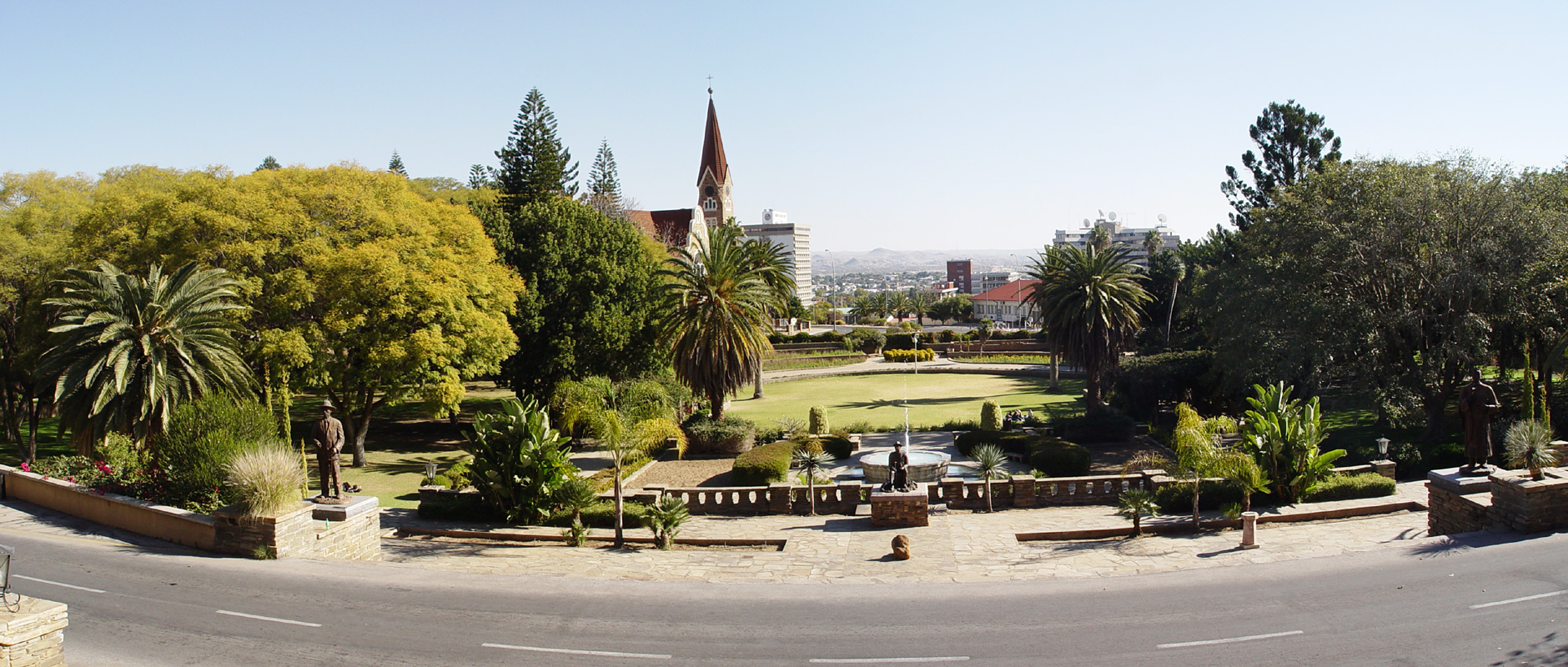
- View of Parliament Gardens from the Tintenpalast steps
- Interactive map of Parliament Gardens
- Type: Natural Area
- Location: Namibia, Windhoek
- Created: 2022
- Operator: College of the Arts.

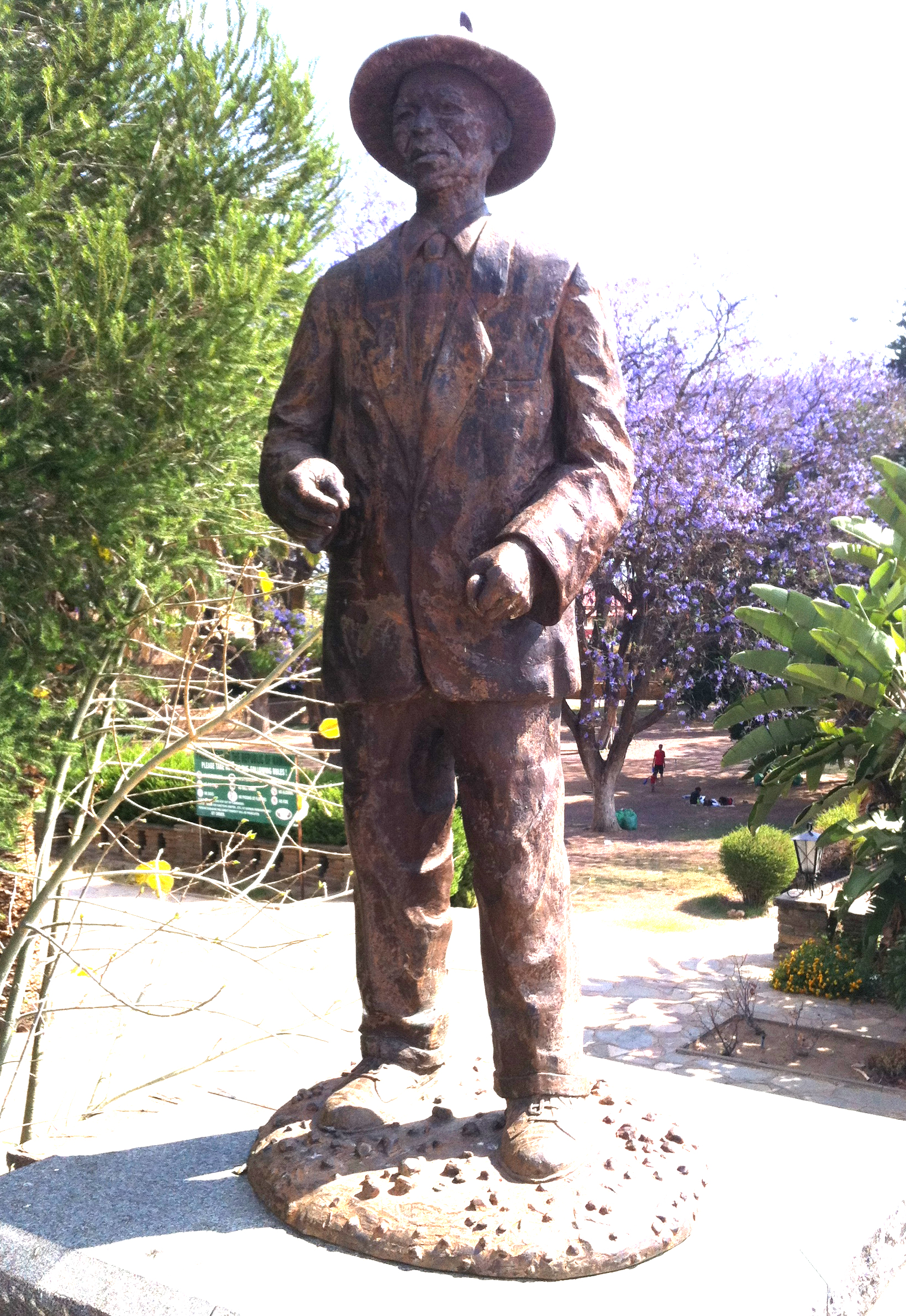
Monument of Captain Hendrik Samuel Witbooi at Parliament Gardens in Windhoek

The Parliament Gardens is a small park in downtown Windhoek, Namibia. It is located between the Tintenpalast (Namibia's Parliament building) and the Christuskirche. It was laid out in 1932 and was originally called the Tintenpalast gardens, adopting its present name after Namibian independence in 1990.

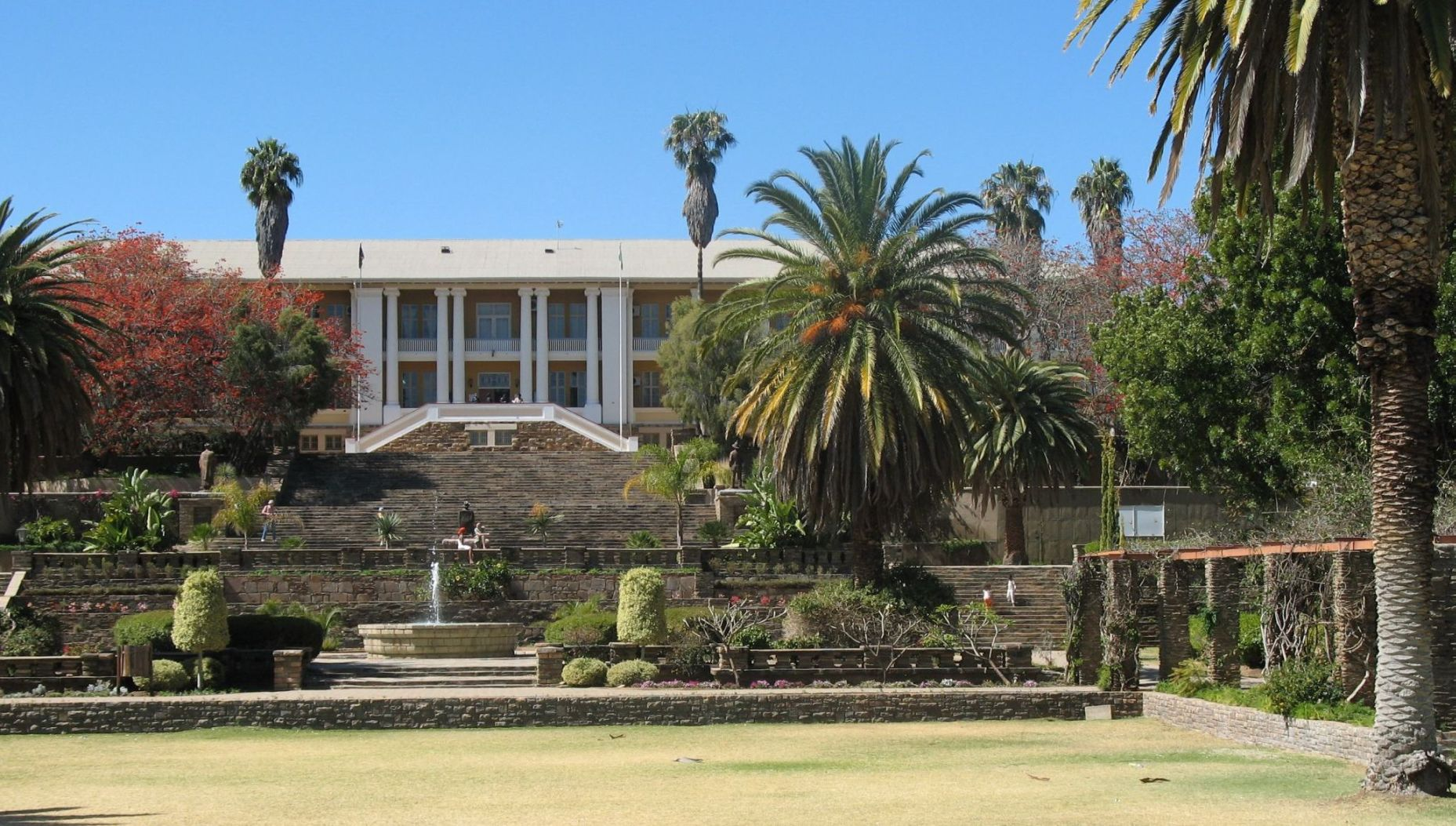
Facing the Tintenpalast

The Parliament Gardens contain Namibia's first post-independence monument: a bronze-cast statue of the Herero chief Hosea Kutako. Two other Namibian nationalists are also honoured with bronze statues in the gardens: Hendrik Samuel Witbooi and Theophilus Hamutumbangela. The three statues flank the steps towards the main entrance of the parliament building.

The gardens used to be an olive plantation, and still include an olive grove. They also contain a bowling green lined with bougainvilleas along with a thatched-roof clubhouse. Since Januar 2017 the Parliament Garden is closed for public due to the ongoing bio-rehabilitation exercise of the gardens. In 2022, a petition to open the parliament gardens was submitted, but it remains closed (November 2025).

In 2016, the opening of the Namibian Parliament was held in the Parliament Gardens because of limited space in the Tintenpalast. Due to a change to the Constitution in 2014, the number of parliamentarians had increased significantly, and so joint sittings have to be held elsewhere.

Rough Guides describes the Parliament Gardens as "delightful, shady... definitely merit a stroll". The gardens are "particularly popular at lunchtimes and weekends, when students laze on the lawns poring over their books or each other." They are also a "popular place for a lunchtime picnic."
