= Redecker =

Redecker is a surname. Notable people with the surname include:

- Gottlieb Redecker (1871–1945), German engineer and architect
- Johann Wilhelm Redecker (1836–1911), German missionary
- Júlio Redecker (1956–2007), Brazilian politician
