= Margaret Mensah-Williams =

Namibian politician (born 1961)

Honourable Margaret Mensah-Williams MP
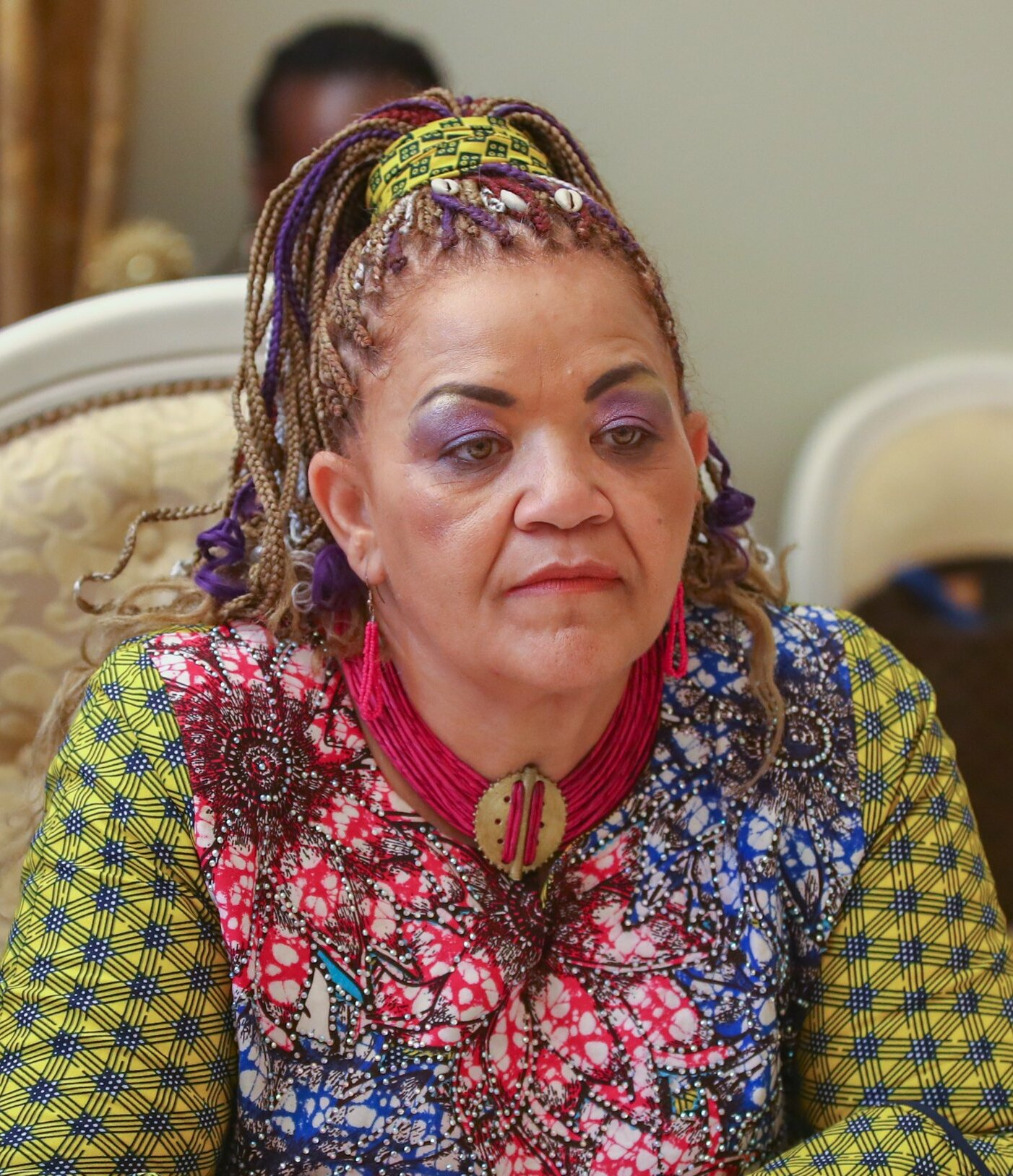
- Mensah-Williams in 2017

Namibian Ambassador to the United States
- Incumbent
- Assumed office December 2020
- Preceded by: Monica Nashandi

Chairperson of the National Council
- In office 8 December 2015 – 9 December 2019
- Preceded by: Asser Kuveri Kapere
- Succeeded by: Bernard Sibalatani

Regional Councillor for the Khomasdal Constituency
- In office 1998–2019
- Preceded by: Karel Persendt
- Succeeded by: Samuel Angolo

Personal details
- Born: Margaret Natalie Mensah; 25 December 1961 (age 64) Mariental, South West Africa (now Namibia)
- Party: SWAPO
- Education: Eastern and Southern African Management Institute
- Occupation: Teacher
- Profession: Politician; Diplomat
- Committees: Chairperson of the National Council Standing Committee on Women Caucus

Margaret Natalie Mensah-Williams (born 25 December 1961) is a Namibian politician, diplomat, and prominent SWAPO member. She currently serves as Namibia's ambassador to the United States.

Mensah-Williams also served as a councillor of Windhoek's Khomasdal North constituency from 1998 until 2019, and from this position was elected to represent Khomas Region in the National Council, the upper house of the Namibian Parliament from 2015 to 2019. In the National Council she was elected deputy chairperson in 1998, and chairperson in 2015. She resigned from all regional representative positions prior to the 2019 Namibian general election in order to contest for a seat in the National Assembly, Namibia's lower house, and subsequently became a member of Parliament.

== Early life and education ==
Mensah-Williams was born in Mariental in central Namibia. She attended school at Keetmanshoop. She obtained a teaching diploma from Dower College, South Africa, in 1983, a diploma in Housing and Community Development from the University of Cape Town in 1985, a diploma in Negotiation Skills from the Institute of Management and Leadership Training in Windhoek in 1992, and a further diploma in Management and Leadership from the Eastern and Southern African Management Institute in Arusha, Tanzania, in 1993. She also holds a Master of Business Administration.

Mensah-Williams ventured into politics during her time as a student at the University of Cape Town where she was involved in organising protest marches against the apartheid regime both in her native Namibia and in South Africa. After university, she began her career as a teacher and later on worked in civil society.

== Political career ==
In the 1998 regional elections, Mensah-Williams became a councillor of Khomasdal North on a SWAPO ticket. She was subsequently selected to represent Khomas Region in the National Council, and in 1999 she became its vice-chairperson (Deputy Speaker), the first woman to be elected to a major decision-making position in Namibia.

Mensah-Williams was re-elected as councillor for Khomasdal North in 2004, 2010, and 2015. She also continued to serve in the National Council and was elected chairperson in 2015.

Until March 2018, Mensah-Williams served for two consecutive terms as a member of the Inter-Parliamentary Union Executive Committee and served the same body as the President of the IPU Bureau of Women Parliamentarians for two terms. Furthermore, she was elected vice-chairperson of the IPU Working Group on Syria during the 137th IPU Assembly in Russia.

She resigned from all regional representative positions prior to the 2019 Namibian general election in order to contest for a seat in the National Assembly, Namibia's lower house, and subsequently became a member of Parliament, and later resigned as a member of the National Assembly (01-12-2023). In December 2020 she was appointed Namibia's ambassador to the United States.

Mensah-Williams is a member of both the politburo and the central committee of the SWAPO Party. She is married with three children.
