= Theophilus Hamutumbangela =

Namabian activist and priest

- Born: 6 February 1917; Onghala, Ohangwena Region, Namibia
- Died: 28 November 1990 (aged 73); Windhoek

Ecclesiastical career
- Church: Anglican
- Ordained: 1946 (deacon); 1947 (priest)
- Title: Reverend

Reverend Theophilus Hingashikuka Hamutumbangela (6 February 1917 – 28 November 1990) was a Namibian anti-apartheid activist, priest, and leading international promoter of Namibian independence, working alongside British anti-apartheid activist Reverend Michael Scott.

== Life and career ==
Hamutumbangela was the nephew of Mandume Ya Ndemufayo, king of the Ovambo people. He was born on the same day that his uncle died. Hamutumbangela was a tall and strongly-built man.

At age 17, Hamutumbangela went to St. Mary's mission at Odibo: first as a student, and then as a teacher. He then studied theology at St. Bedes, Umtata, and was ordained as a deacon in 1946, and as a priest in 1947. He served in parishes in Etale, Windhoek, and Omboloka.

Hamutumbangela spoke out against the racism and injustices of the apartheid regime and petitioned the United Nations numerous times regarding Namibian independence. He was one of the founders of the Ovamboland People's Organization and a leading figure in the Old Location Uprising.

Hamutumbangela was arrested in 1966, and allegedly poisoned by the South African authorities. The poison paralyzed his nervous system, and he was physically and mentally handicapped until his death in 1990.

== Recognition ==
In 2012, Rev. Theofilus Hamutumbangela Station in Oshikango was established and named in his honour.

Along with Hosea Kutako and Hendrik Samuel Witbooi Avenues, there is a bronze statue of Hamutumbangela in the Parliament Gardens in Windhoek.
