= Namibia–United States relations =

- Namibia: United States

Namibia–United States relations are bilateral relations between Namibia and the United States. Relations were officially established in 1990 upon Namibia gaining independence from apartheid South Africa. The current ambassador of Namibia to the United States is Wilbard Hellao.

== History ==
During the South African Border War, the United States mediated in bringing to fruition the Tripartite Accord which committed to a withdrawal of Cuban and South African military personnel from Angola and South West Africa (present-day Namibia) respectively. The United States recognized Namibia on 21 March 1990 soon after obtaining independence from South Africa. The U.S. Liaison Office at Windhoek was elevated to an embassy.

Relations between both nations are friendly. The United States participated in the diplomatic efforts to bring about Namibia’s independence from South Africa and has since worked to strengthen political, economic, and people-to-people ties. The bilateral relationship is characterized by a shared commitment to democratic principles, including the rule of law, respect for human rights, independence of the judiciary, and freedom of the press. The United States and Namibia are partners in the effort to combat HIV/AIDS, stem wildlife trafficking and promote conservation, and expand trade and development opportunities.

== Resident diplomatic missions ==
of Namibia in the United States

- Washington, D.C. (Embassy)

of the United States in Namibia

- Windhoek (Embassy)

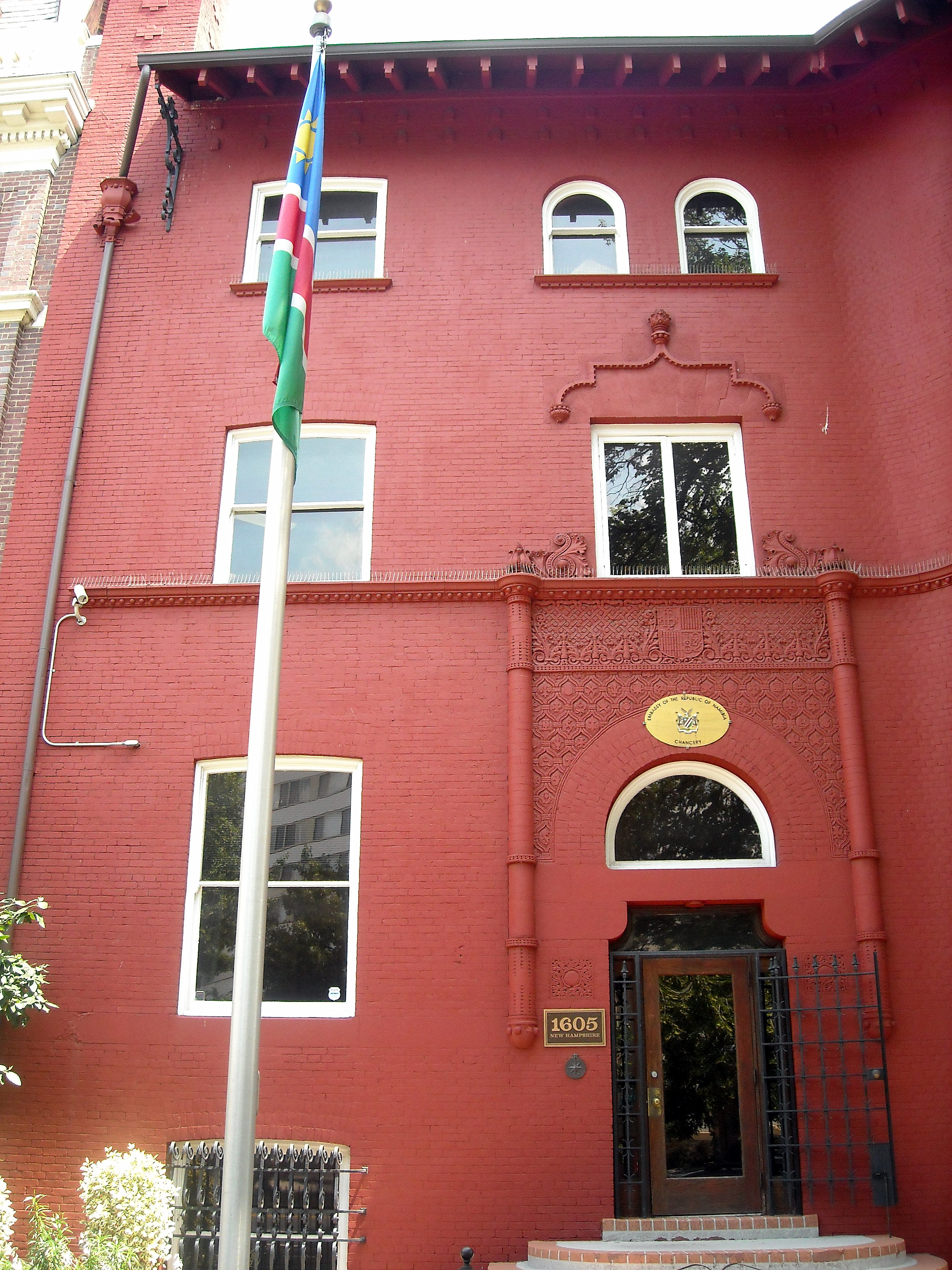
Embassy of Namibia in Washington, D.C.

== See also ==
- Namibian Americans
