= Khomasdal Constituency =

Electoral constituency in the Khomas region of central Namibia

Coordinates: 22°32′28″S 17°03′30″E

Khomasdal constituency (red) in the Khomas Region

Khomasdal Constituency (until 2013: Khomasdal North Constituency) is a constituency in Windhoek in the Khomas Region of Namibia. As of December 2019 it had 25,550 registered voters. The constituency consists of parts of the suburbs Khomasdal, Katutura, and Otjomuise. It had a population of 43,921 in 2011, up from 27,950 in 2001.

== Politics ==
Khomasdal is traditionally a stronghold of the South West Africa People's Organization (SWAPO) party. The first councillor of this constituency was SWAPO's Karel Persendt. In 1998, Margaret Mensah-Williams, also on a SWAPO ticket, took over from him. She was subsequently selected to represent Khomas Region in the National Council, and in 1999 she became its vice-chairperson (deputy speaker), the first woman to be elected to a major decision-making position in Namibia. Mensah-Williams was re-elected in 2004 and 2010. She also won the 2015 regional elections with 4,121 votes. Sylvester Kazapua of the Democratic Turnhalle Alliance (DTA) came second with 723 votes. Uzikama Kandjii of the National Unity Democratic Organisation (NUDO, 384 votes) and Bartholomeus Kauahuma of the South West Africa National Union (SWANU, 170 votes) also contested this election.

After councillor Mensah-Williams was fielded as a parliamentary candidate in the 2019 Namibian general election, a by-election became necessary for Khomasdal because Namibian electoral law prohibits sitting councillors and members of the public service to run for a seat in parliament. The by-election was conducted on 15 January 2020. Samuel Angolo (SWAPO) won with 1,227 votes, followed by Mara Baumgartner of the Landless People's Movement (LPM, 349 votes), Raymond Diergaardt of the Popular Democratic Movement (PDM, the new name of the DTA, 326 votes) and Bartholomeus Kauahuma (SWANU, 202 votes). Councillor Angolo of SWAPO was re-elected in the 2020 regional election receiving 2,337 votes. Frans Wilbard of the Independent Patriots for Change (IPC), an opposition party formed in August 2020, came second with 1,503 votes. This election was also contested by the LPM (candidate Christiaan Tseitseimou, 1,285 votes), the PDM (Nadine Pienaar, 881 votes), and the NUDO (Sylvester Kazapua, 679 votes).
