= Johann Wilhelm Redecker =

Johann Wilhelm Redecker (29 September 1836 in Jöllenbeck, today a suburb of Bielefeld, Germany – 27 January 1911 in Otjimbingwe, South West Africa, today Namibia) was a missionary with the Rhenish Missionary Society (RMS) in South West Africa, a merchant, and the father of Gottlieb Redecker, the official architect of the German colonial government who designed some of Windhoek's most iconic buildings, including the Tintenpalast and the Christ Church.

Redecker landed at Walvis Bay on 15 May 1867 as one of the Rhenish Missionaries joining Carl Hugo Hahn to settle the area. He settled first in Omaruru and later in Otjimbingwe, but when the latter mission closed in 1874, he stayed behind as a merchant through the decade and likely beyond, running a store in town. According to other sources, Redecker lived in South West Africa as a colonial merchant for the Wupperthal Trading Company, established by the RMS. In 1870, this company was renamed the Missions-Handels-Aktien-Gesellschaft (MHAG, Mission Trading Company), with branches in Otjimbingwe, Walvis Bay, Okahandja, and Rehoboth, among others. The company had to dissolve in 1880, following severe losses amid the Nama-Herero war. Redecker and Eduard Hälbich, both of whom were based in South West Africa, subsequently plied their trade as independent merchants and wagon-makers.

Redecker was married twice: on 31 March 1869 to Lina Gronemeyer of Gütersloh, where their children also attended school, and later in 1885 to Anna Maria Husemann. Between both marriages, eight children were born. Among the children's caretakers was Johanna Gertze, who on 25 July 1858 was the first Herero to be baptized.
