= Sinimbo =

Sinimbo is a surname of Namibian origin.

== List of people with the surname ==
- Lukas Sinimbo Muha, Namibian politician
- Verna Sinimbo, Namibian politician

== See also ==
- Sinimbu
