= Hendrik Witbooi =

Hendrik Witbooi may refer to:

- Hendrik Witbooi (Nama chief) (1825–1905)
- Hendrik Samuel Witbooi (1906–1978)
- Hendrik Witbooi (politician) (1934–2009), deputy prime minister of Namibia
