= 2025 Namibian local and regional elections =

Elections in Namibia

- 26 November 2025
- Registered: 1,499,449
- Turnout: 40.7% (▲2.44pp)
Party	SWAPO	IPC	PDM
popular vote	382,067	74,176	31,388
Percentage	63.35%	12.30%	5.20%
Party	LPM	UDF	Other parties
popular vote	22,512	17,272	75,652
Percentage	3.73%	2.86%	12.56%
- Constituencies of Namibia

Local and regional elections were held in Namibia on 26 November 2025 to elect new local and regional councils. The previous round of elections was held in 2020 and won by the ruling SWAPO party.

== Electoral system ==
Elections for Namibian regional councils are held using the first-past-the-post electoral system. Voters in each constituency elect one councillor to represent them on their regional council. Local authority councillors are elected by a system of proportional representation. Local authority candidate lists have affirmative action requirements for women.

In the regional elections, for each of the 121 constituencies of Namibia one individual is elected to serve as constituency councillor and to represent their constituency in the respective regional council. The regional councils in turn select 3 representatives each to serve in the National Council.

Local elections determine the population of the village, town, and city councils and are determined by party list rather than individual candidate.

== Election process ==
A supplementary voter registration was conducted between 4 and 19 August 2025. The final voter register was released on 24 October 2025, clearing 1,499,449 voters.

== Results ==
=== Regional elections (popular vote) ===
Party	Votes	%
SWAPO	0	–
Independent Patriots for Change	0	–
Popular Democratic Movement	0	–
Landless People's Movement	0	–
United Democratic Front (Namibia)	0	–
Other parties	0	–
Total		
Registered voters/turnout		40.7
Source: Electoral Commission of Namibia

=== Local authority elections (council seats) ===
Party	Votes	%	Seats	
SWAPO	0	–	210	
Independent Patriots for Change	0	–	58	
Landless People's Movement			27	
Popular Democratic Movement				–
Total			295	
Registered voters/turnout		36.3		
Source: The Namibian
