= Brazil–Namibia relations =

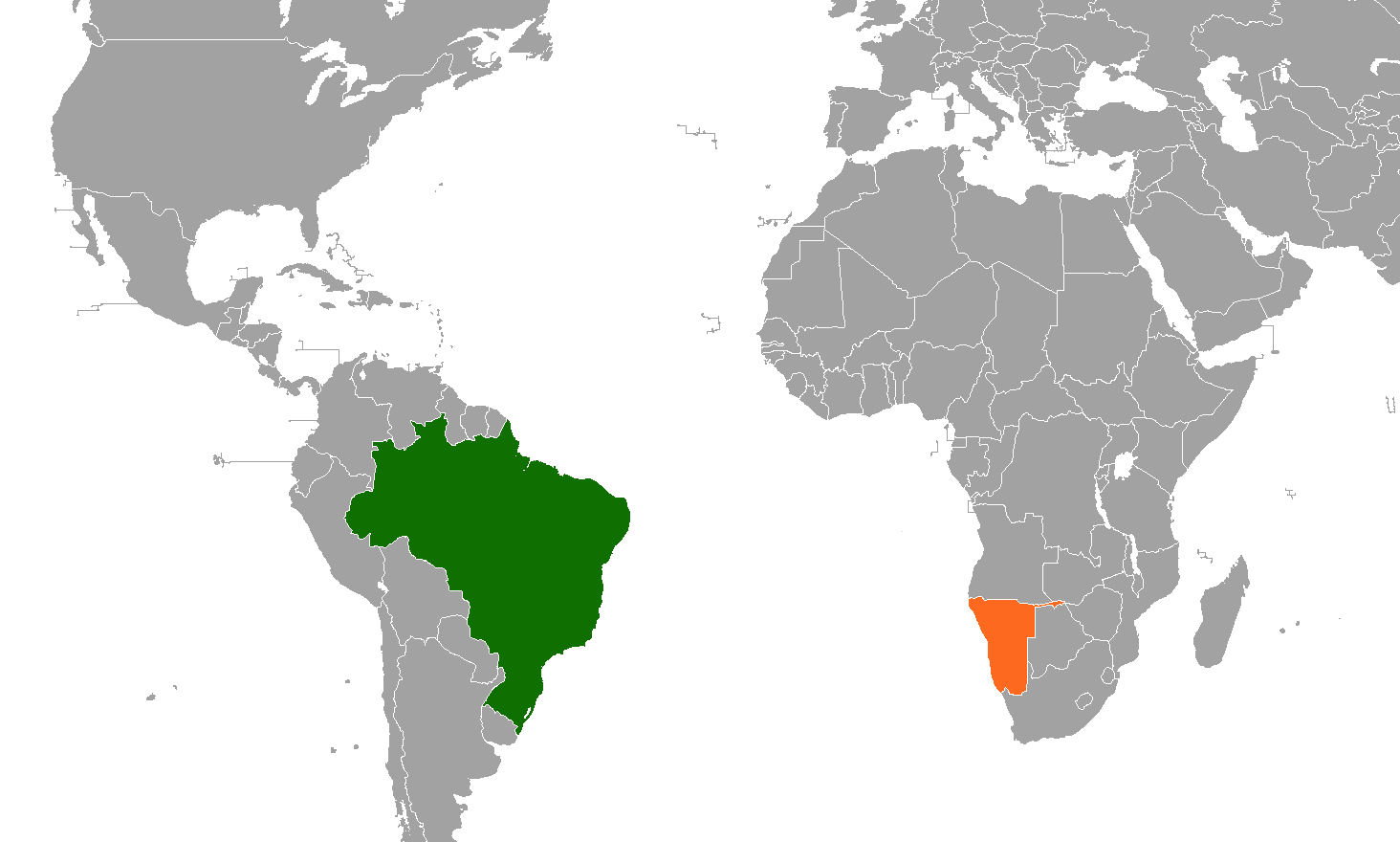
- Brazil: Namibia

Brazil and Namibia established diplomatic relations in 1990. Both nations are members of the Group of 77 and the United Nations.

== History ==
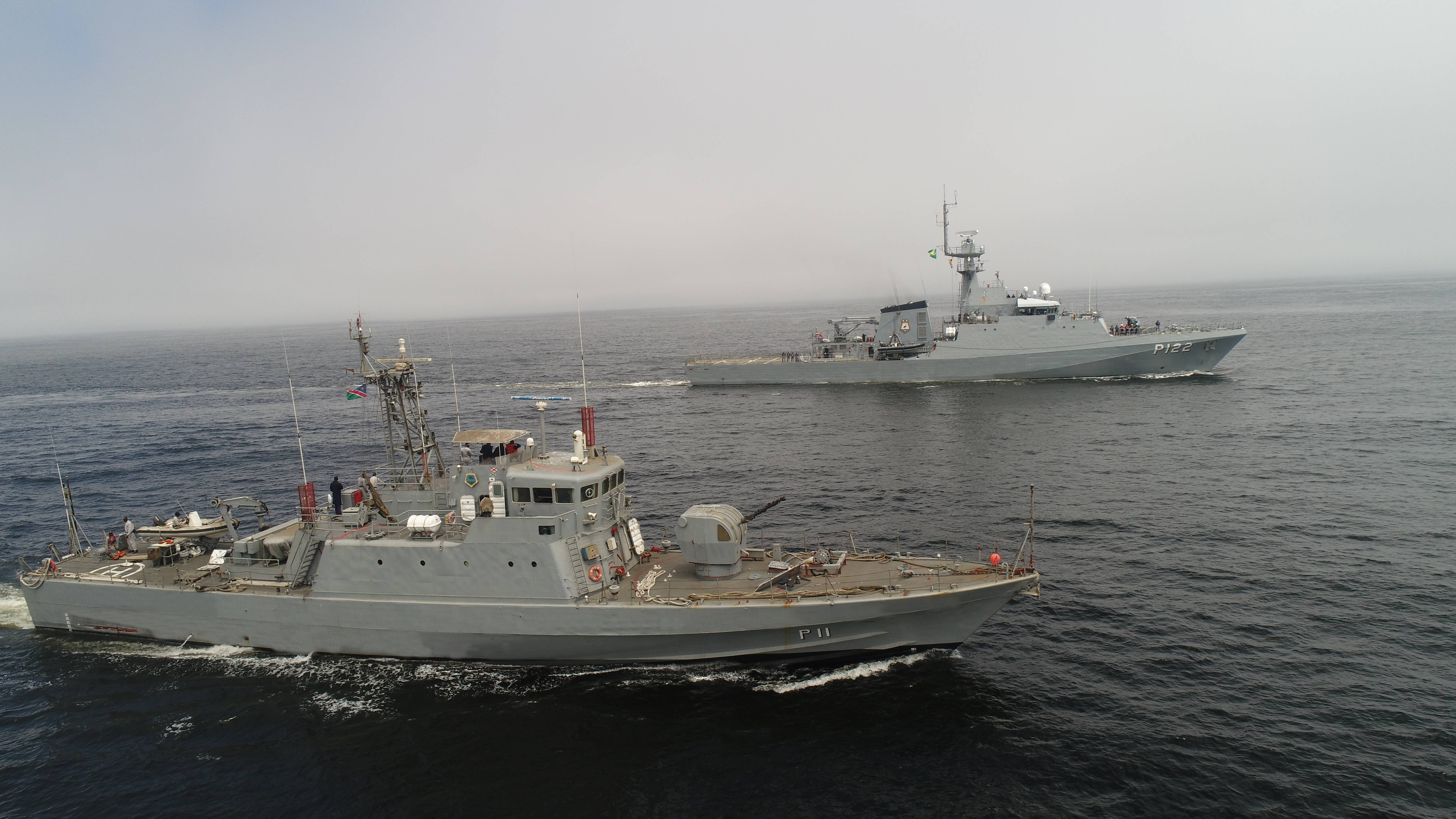
Joint naval exercise between Brazil and Namibia in Walvis Bay; March 2021.

In 1966, the South African Border War began between the South West Africa People's Organisation (SWAPO) fighting for South West African (present day Namibia) independence against South Africa who had occupied the territory since 1915 as a province and had imposed Apartheid policies in the country. In the early 1980s, Brazil established relations with SWAPO. In March 1987, Sam Nujoma, as head of SWAPO, paid a visit to Brazil seeking international support and met with Brazilian President José Sarney. Two years later, Brazil opened a consulate in Windhoek. Within the United Nations, Brazil supported the negotiating process that led to Namibia's independence in 1990. That same year, the two nations established diplomatic relations.

In September 1991, Brazilian President, Fernando Collor de Mello, paid a visit to Namibia and opened the Brazilian embassy in Windhoek. In November 1995, Sam Nujoma paid his first official visit to Brazil as President of Namibia. He would later visit Brazil on two further occasions (in 1999 and 2004). In 2003, Namibia opened an embassy in Brasília. In November 2003, Brazilian President Luiz Inácio Lula da Silva paid a visit to Namibia and in February 2009, Namibian President Hifikepunye Pohamba paid a visit to Brazil.

Naval cooperation between both nations began in 1994, when Walvis Bay was returned to Namibia by South Africa. That same year, the Naval Mission of Brazil in Namibia was created, an institution that has been deepening the mutual knowledge of the navies of both countries. From 2001 to 2011, approximately 1,179 Namibian military personnel (90% of the Navy's personnel) were trained in Brazilian schools, which represents the largest contingent of trained foreign officers in the country. Brazil has also provided Namibia with naval ships.

Since 2009, Brazilian multinational company, Petrobras, has operated in Namibia. Other Brazilian companies such as Grupo OAS and Queiroz Galvão operate in the country. In 2017, Namibian company, Walvis Bay Corridor Group, opened an office in São Paulo with the aim to facilitate a direct shipping line between Brazil and Walvis Bay, therefore deepening relations between both nations.

== High-level visits ==
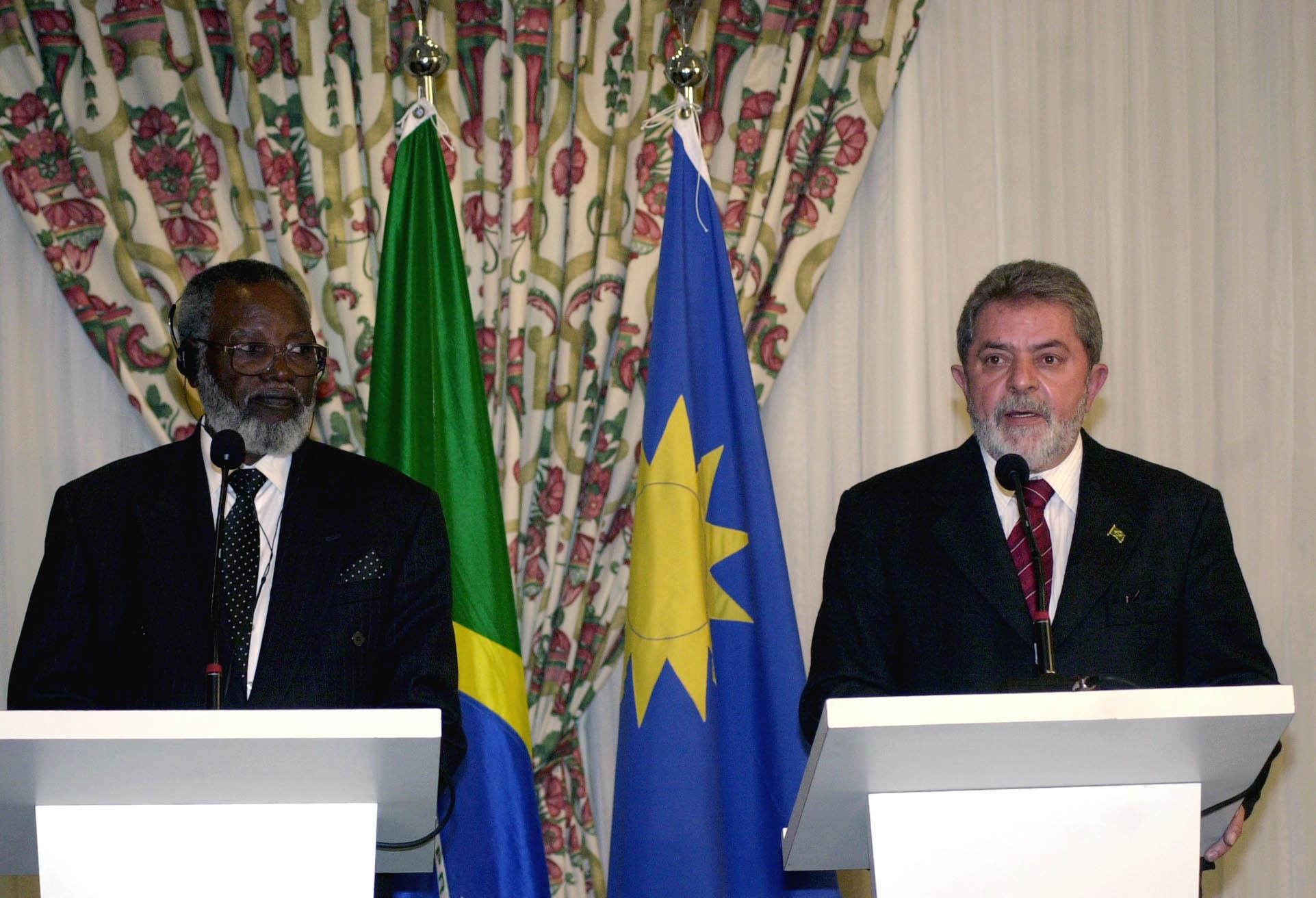
Brazilian President Luiz Inácio Lula da Silva and President Sam Nujoma in São Paulo; June 2004.

High-level visits from Brazil to Namibia

- President Fernando Collor de Mello (1991)
- President Luiz Inácio Lula da Silva (2003)
- Vice President José Alencar (2005)
- Foreign Minister Antonio Patriota (2011)
- Foreign Minister Celso Amorim (2013)
- Foreign Minister Aloysio Nunes (2017)

High-level visits from Namibia to Brazil

- Foreign Minister Theo-Ben Gurirab (1995)
- President Sam Nujoma (1995, 1999, 2004)
- Foreign Minister Marco Hausiku (2008)
- President Hifikepunye Pohamba (2009)
- Foreign Minister Utoni Nujoma (2012)

== Bilateral agreements ==
Both nations have signed a few agreements such as an Agreement for Naval Cooperation (1994); Agreement for Technical Cooperation (1995); Agreement for Cultural and Educational Cooperation (1995) and an Agreement on Defense Cooperation (2009).

== Resident diplomatic missions ==
Of Brazil

- Windhoek (Embassy)

Of Namibia

- Brasília (Embassy)

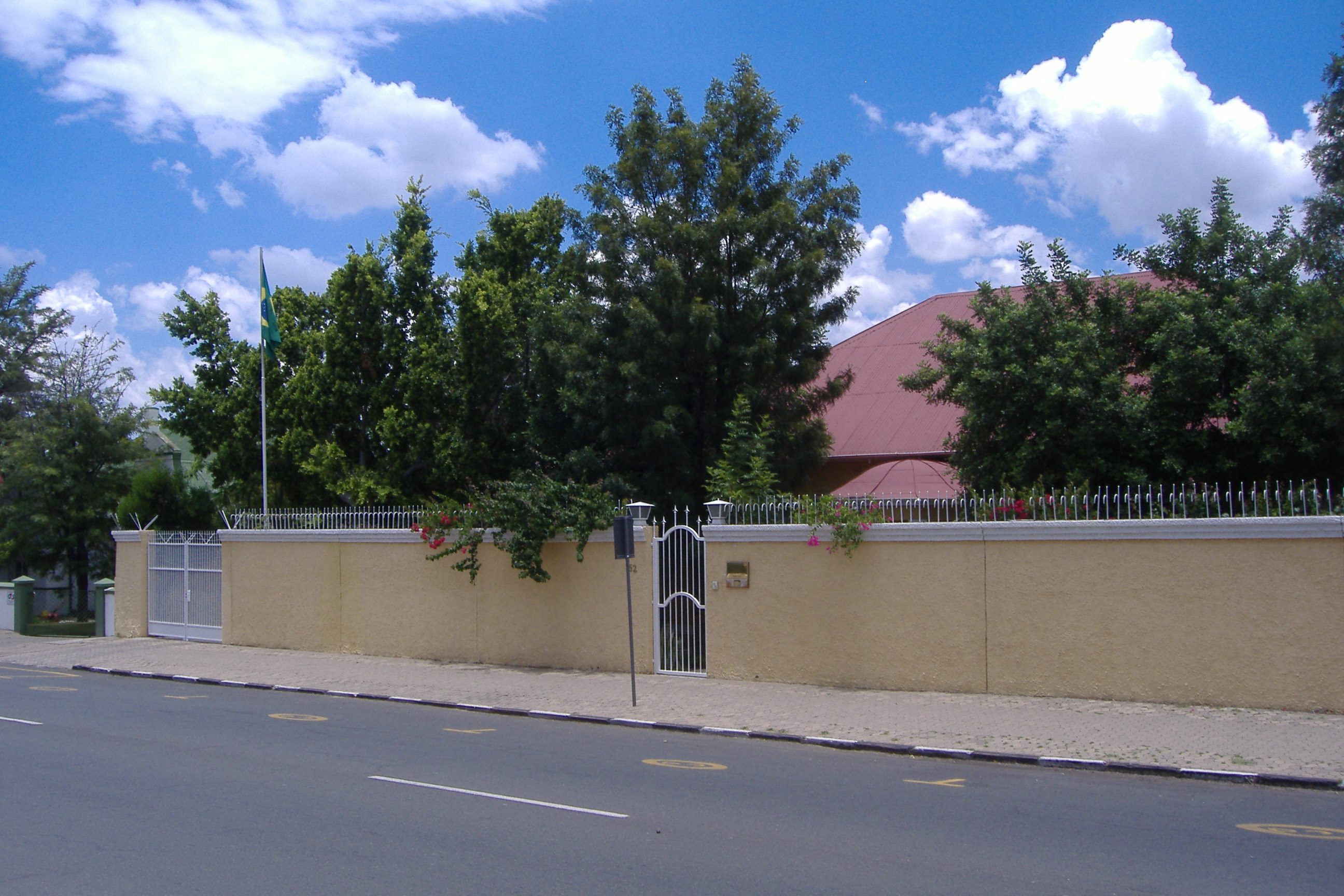
Embassy of Brazil in Windhoek

== See also ==
- Foreign relations of Brazil
- Foreign relations of Namibia
- List of ambassadors of Namibia to Brazil
- NS Brendan Simbwaye
