= Kandy Nehova =

Namibian politician

Kandy Nehova (born 26 September 1946) is a Namibian politician. A member of the Rally for Democracy and Progress (RDP), Nehova was a member of the National Assembly of Namibia following the 2009 election. In September 2010, Nehova and eight other opposition politicians were sworn-in as members of the National Assembly following a six-month boycott due to electoral irregularities in the 2009 election. The electoral irregularities were ruled by a court of law to be unfounded.

== Career ==
Formerly a leading member of SWAPO, Nehova was the first Chairperson of the National Council of Namibia from 1993 to 2004. He represented Ongwediva. He resigned in November 2007 as a member of SWAPO, the same month as RDP founder Hidipo Hamutenya.
