= List of chairpersons of the National Council of Namibia =

Below is a list of chairpersons of the National Council of Namibia, the upper house of the country's bicameral parliament.

Name	Took office	Left office	Notes
Kandy Nehova	23 February 1993	16 December 2004	
Asser Kuveri Kapere	16 December 2004	8 December 2015	
Margaret Mensah-Williams	8 December 2015	9 December 2019	
Bernard Sibalatani	9 December 2019	4 December 2020	
Lukas Sinimbo Muha	15 December 2020	Present	
