= Victoria Kauma =

Namibian politician (born 1962)

Deputy Chairperson of the National Council of Namibia
- Incumbent
- Assumed office 9 December 2019

Personal details
- Born: 2 December 1962 (age 63)
- Party: SWAPO

Victoria Mbawo Kauma (born 2 December 1962) is a Namibian politician from SWAPO. In the Parliament of Namibia, she serves as a deputy chair. She is a councillor in Rundu Urban.

== See also ==
- List of members of the 8th National Assembly of Namibia
