= Gottlieb Redecker =

German engineer and architect

Gottlieb Wilhelm Eduard Redecker (30 April 1871, Otjimbingwe, Namibia – 21 January 1945, Gütersloh, Germany) was a German civil engineer and architect in South West Africa (now Namibia). He was responsible for a number of important buildings which still stand today in Namibia, particularly in Windhoek, including the national assembly building, the Tintenpalast.

== Life ==
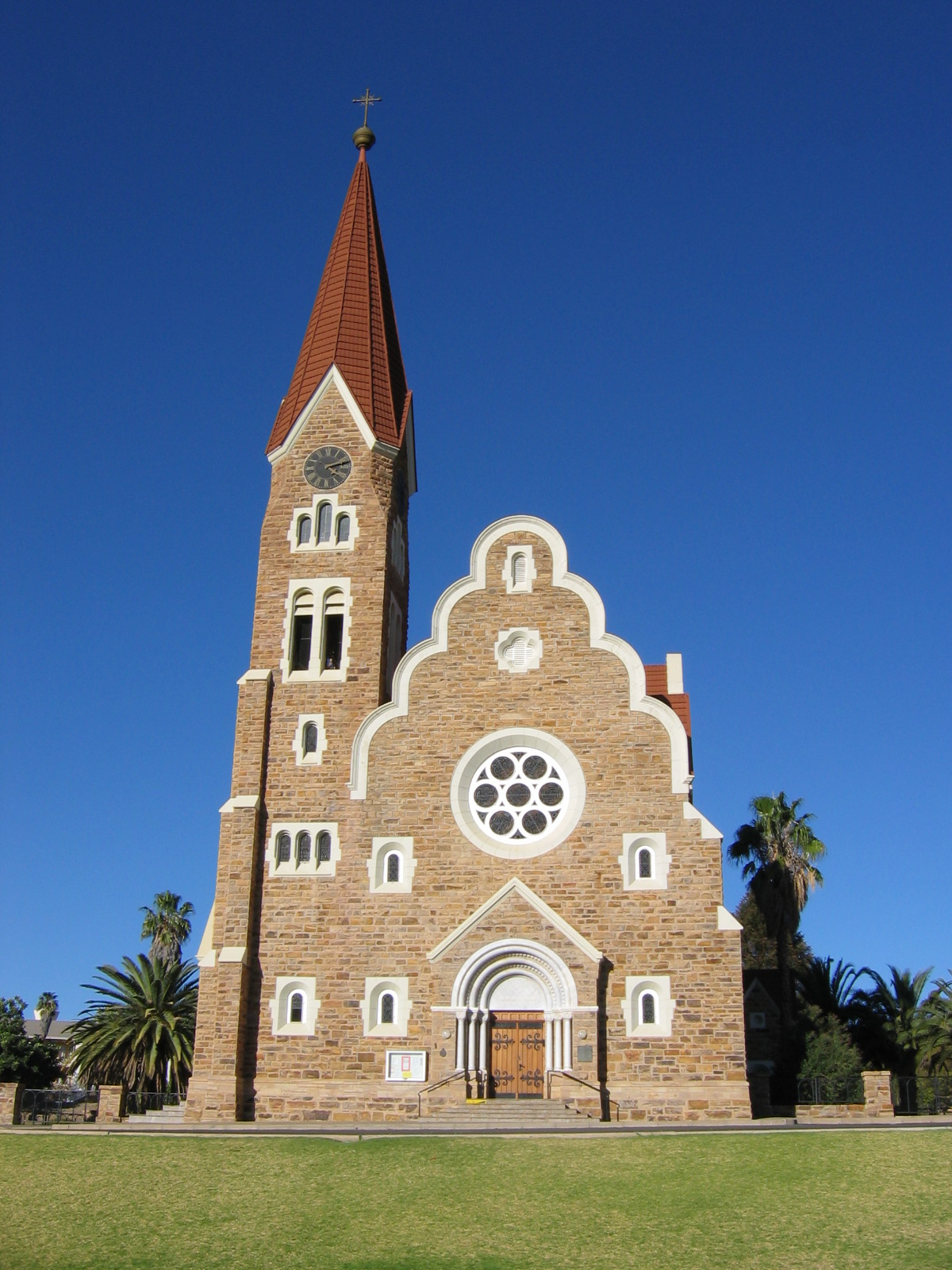
Christ Church, Windhoek

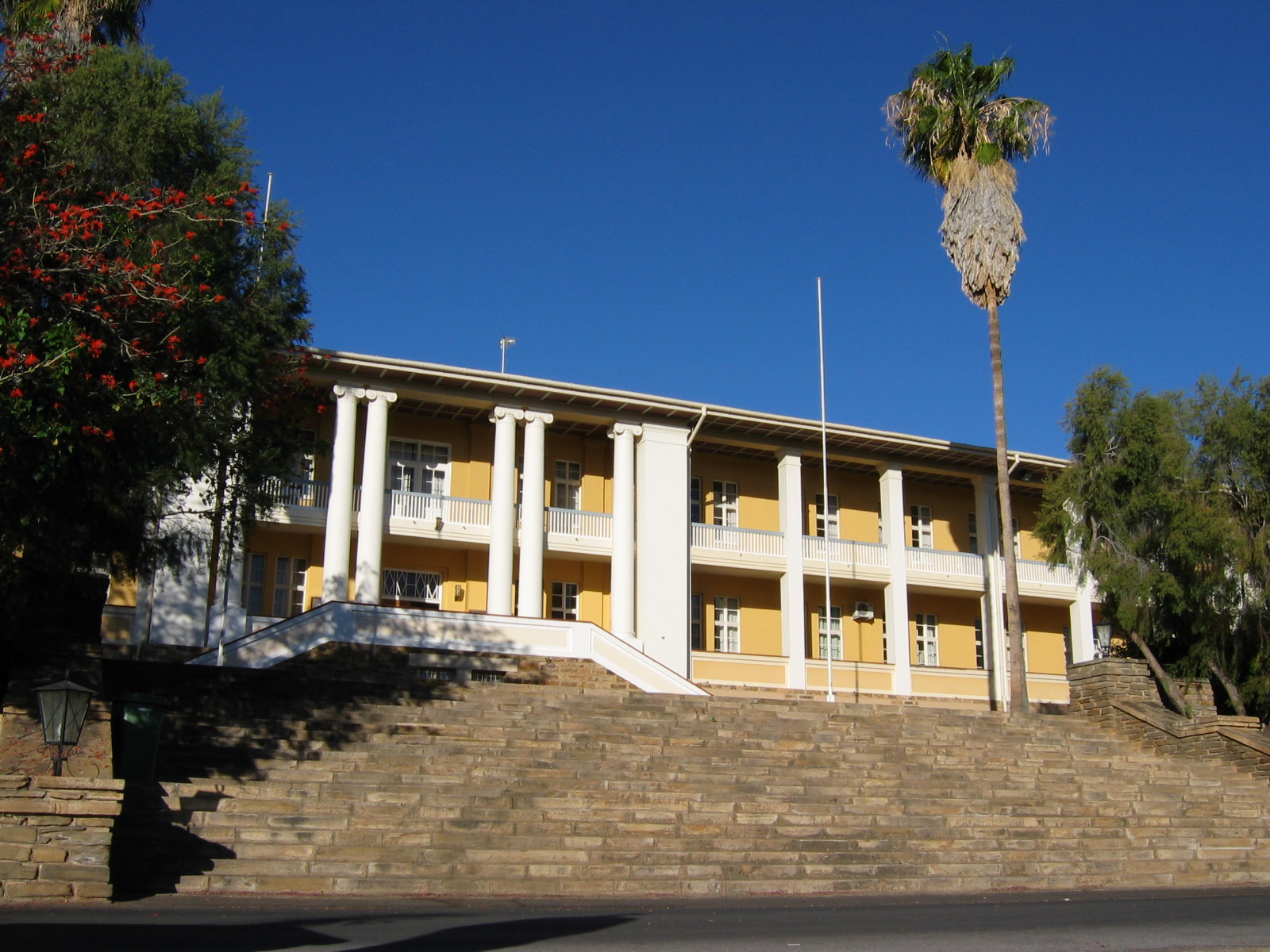
Tintenpalast, Windhoek

Gottlieb Redecker was the eldest of seven siblings born to Johann Wilhelm Redecker (1836–1911) and his wife, Maria Caroline Amalie (née Gronemeyer), who came to Otjimbingwe in the then South West Africa from Bielefeld in Westphalia in 1867.

Gottlieb was one of the first students of the Augustineum, which was later attended by the sons of the famous Herero chief Samuel Maharero. After his mother had died when he was 11, he was sent back to Germany accompanied by missionaries. After completing his secondary education, he studied engineering. On 25 January 1898, he married Joan Marie Elise Kornfeld, by whom he had a daughter, Anne Marie Ilse Klara Redecker. After a second stay in Germany, he returned to Otjimbingwe, at that time the de facto capital of German South West Africa, and was appointed director of engineering in 1901 by the Imperial Government, at which point he began his career as first architect of the country.

Due to his long residence abroad he had lost the German citizenship he inherited from his father and was classified as a Damara by German administrators. He spoke both Damara and Herero fluently and knew the country and the people. Through his language skills and former school friends, he had access to the leading local personalities.

As a distinguished architect Gottlieb Redecker was responsible for a large number of buildings in the country, especially the famous Christ Church and the Tintenpalast ("Ink Palace"). His third and best design for Christ Church, in a neo-Romanesque style, was finally approved by the government. He not only made the drawings, but also oversaw the management of the construction under adverse circumstances. The building was completed on 15 October 1910 after about three years of construction, and dedicated with great festivity.

After the First World War – which ended in South West Africa with the Khorab Peace – Gottlieb was released from internment in Kimberley, South Africa, and returned to Germany from South West Africa in 1921. He retired in 1931. He was killed on 21 January 1945 during an air raid, in which his house was bombed, on Gütersloh, where he was buried.
