= Christ Church, Windhoek =

Lutheran church in Windhoek, Namibia

Coordinates: 22°34′04″S 17°05′14″E

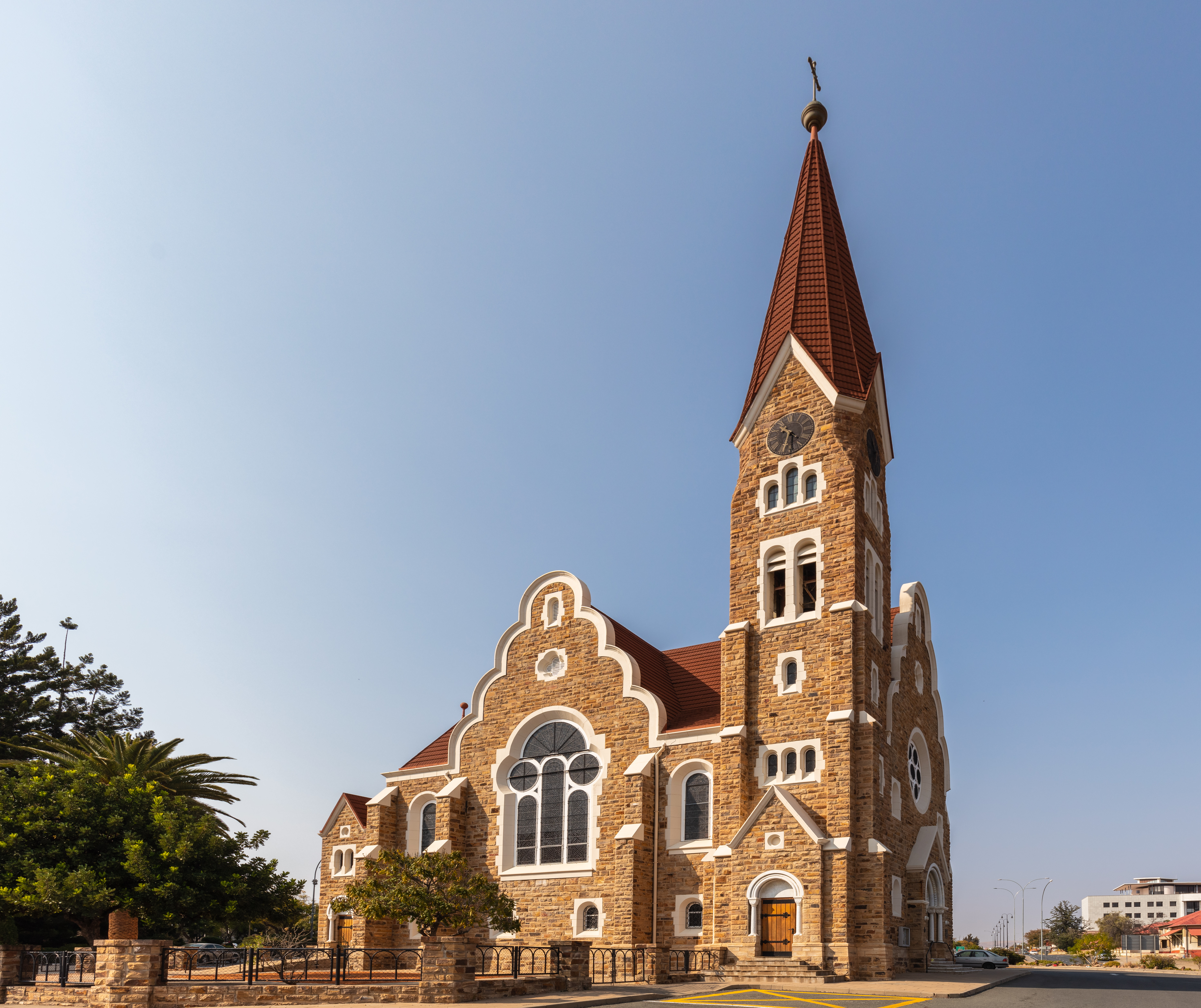
- Christ church’s western facade
- Christ Church, Windhoek
- Location: Windhoek
- Country: Namibia
- Denomination: Evangelical Lutheran Church in the Republic of Namibia

History
- Founded: 16 October 1910

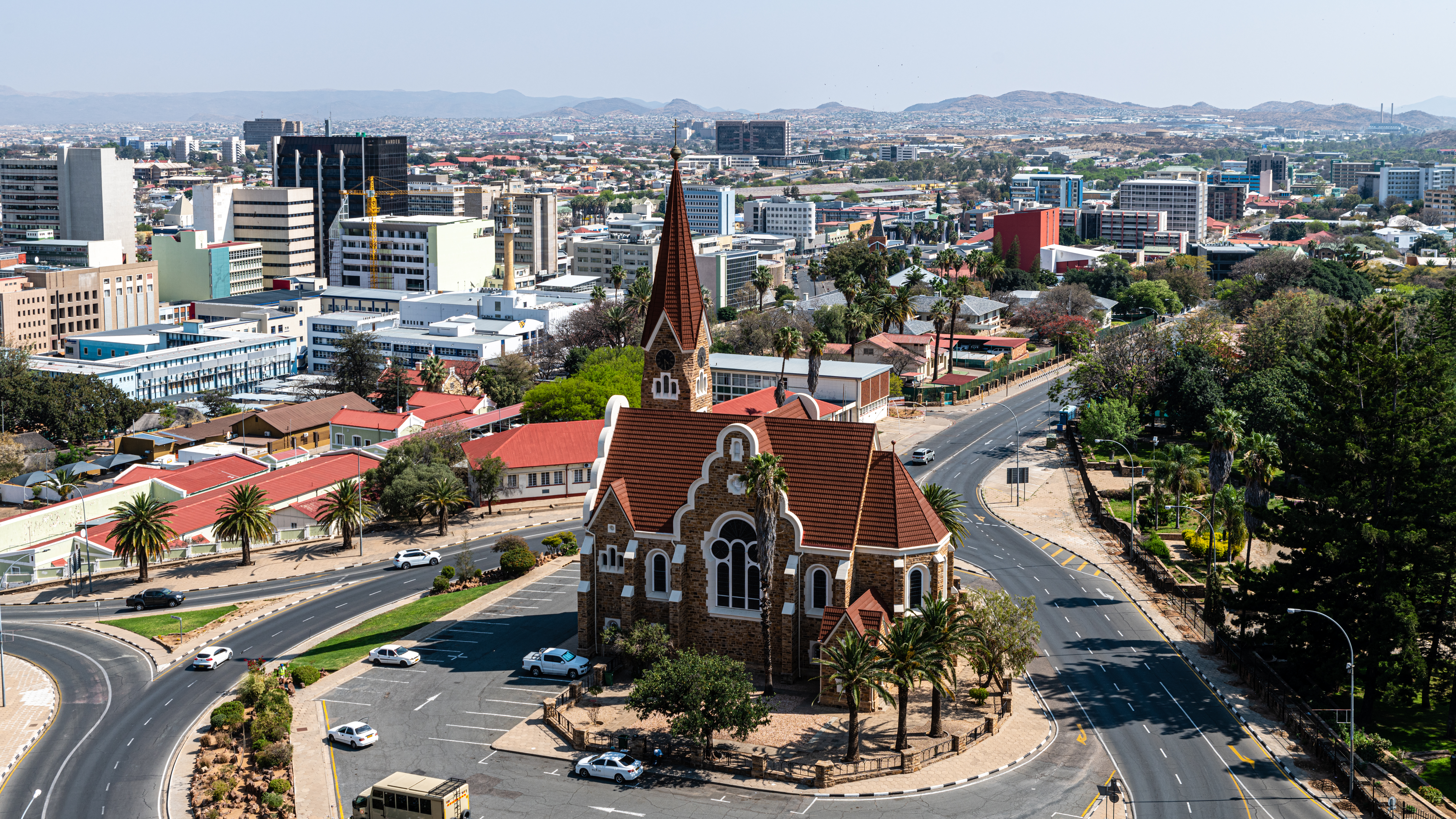
Christ Church, Windhoek

The Christ Church (German: Christuskirche) is a historic landmark and Lutheran church in Windhoek, Namibia, belonging to the German-speaking Evangelical Lutheran Church in Namibia. It was designed by architect Gottlieb Redecker.

== Background ==
The church was built as a symbol of peace following the wars between the Germans, and the Herero and Nama. The foundation stone was laid on 11 August 1907, while on 16 October 1910 the church was officially dedicated. It was originally known as the Church of Peace.

The Christ Church was constructed from quartz sandstone mined from the vicinity of the Avis Dam. The architecture displays a mixture of neo-Romanesque, Art Nouveau and Gothic Revival influences. Its spire is 24 m (79 ft) high.

The portico was made from Carrara marble imported from Italy. The clock and part of the roof was shipped from Germany, as were the three bronze bells cast by Franz Schilling. They bear the inscriptions "Ehre sei Gott in der Höhe" (Glory to God in the highest), "Friede auf Erden" (Peace on earth), and "Den Menschen ein Wohlgefallen" (Goodwill towards men). During a confirmation service in the 1960, the clapper of the main bell came loose, smashed through the window and fell on the street. Window bars were installed after this misfortune.

The colorful stained lead glass windows in the sanctuary were a gift from Emperor Wilhelm II. In the late 1990s a tourist noticed that all of them were installed with the sun protection shield on the inside. In the two years following this discovery, all window elements were restored and refitted for the protective shield to face the outside.

The church is located on a traffic island on Robert Mugabe Avenue, opposite the Tintenpalast.

== Gallery ==
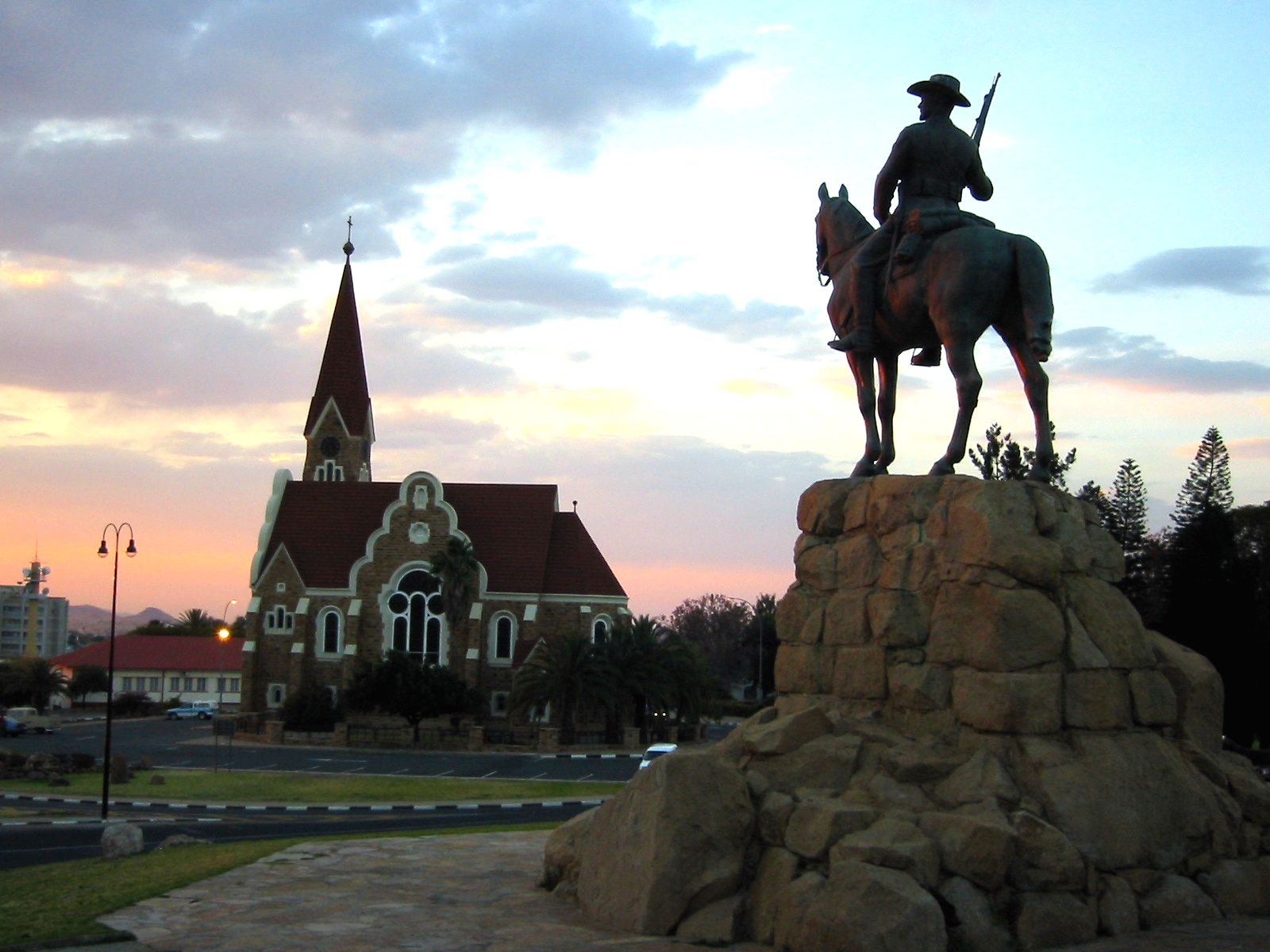
Christ Church and Reiterdenkmal
