= Embassy of Namibia, Washington, D.C. =

Namibian diplomatic mission in the United States

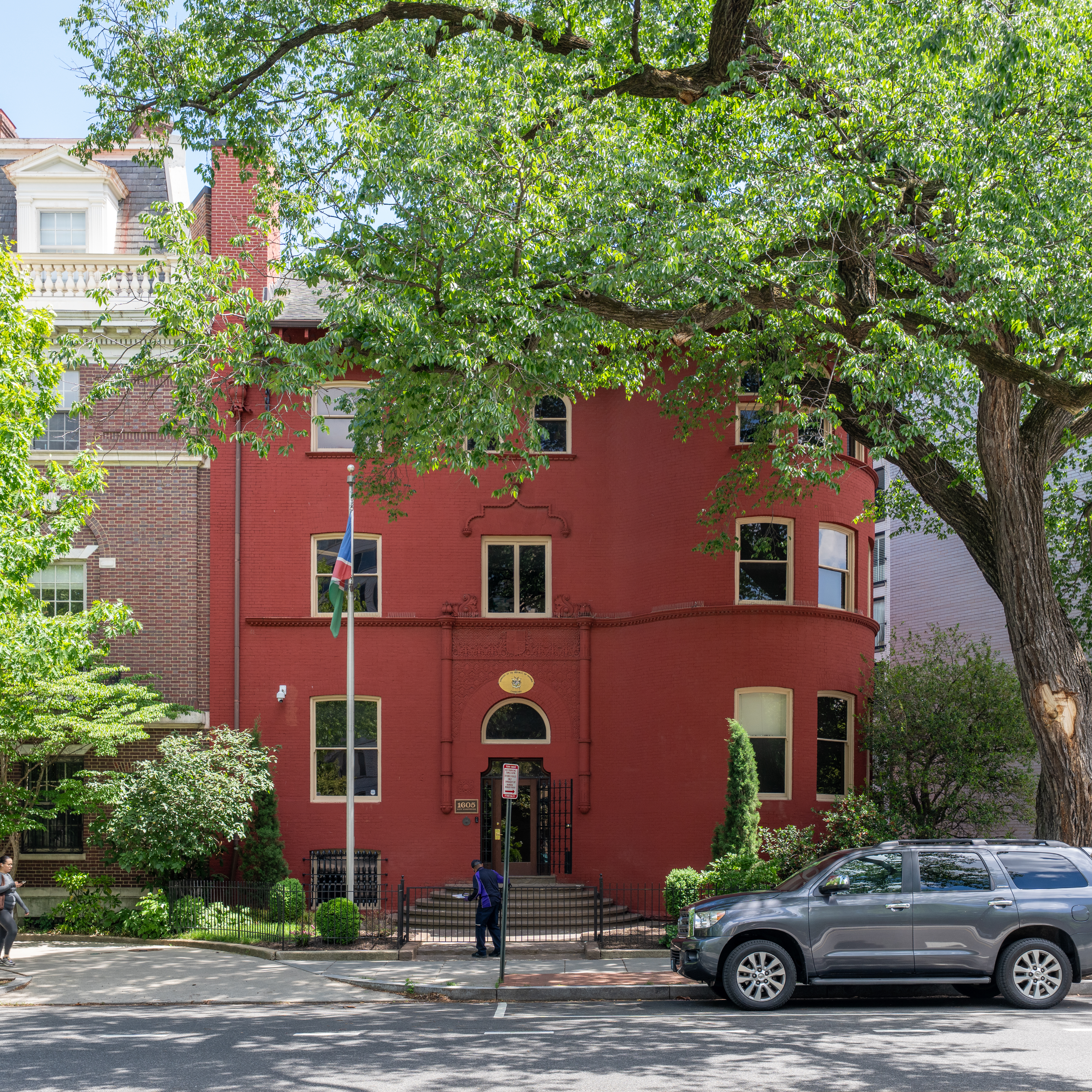
- Location: Washington, D.C.
- Address: 1605 New Hampshire Avenue, N.W.
- Coordinates: 38°54′42″N 77°2′28″W
- Ambassador: Margaret Mensah-Williams

The Embassy of Namibia in Washington, D.C. is the Republic of Namibia's diplomatic mission to the United States. It is located at 1605 New Hampshire Avenue, Northwest, Washington, D.C., in the Dupont Circle neighborhood.

The current ambassador is Margaret Mensah-Williams.
