= Lukas Sinimbo Muha =

Namibian politician, born 1972

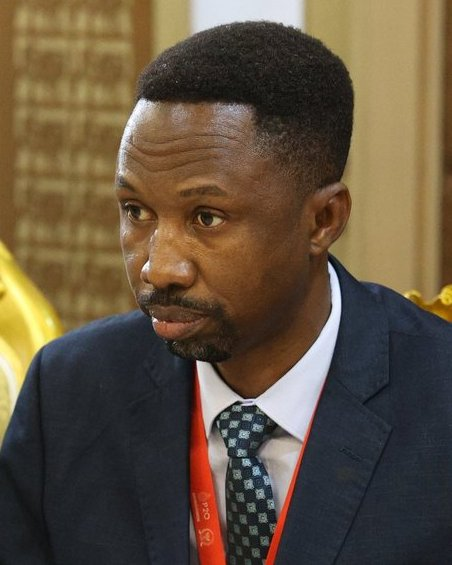
Lukas Muha (2022)

Lukas Sinimbo Muha is a politician from Namibia who is serving as chairperson of the National Council of Namibia from December 2020 and Joint Namibia Branch President of Commonwealth Parliamentary Association.

== Personal life and career ==
He was born on 2 September 1972. A member of SWAPO, he was elected councillor of Mankumpi Constituency in the Kavango West region in the 2015 regional election. He was duly reelected in the 2020 regional election after no opposition party fielded a candidate. Muha was subsequently elected to be one of the three councillors representing Kavango West in the National Council of Namibia, and the National Council elected him as its fifth chairperson.
