= List of ambassadors of Namibia to Brazil =

Coordinates: 15.836867°S 47.867265°W

Ambassador of Namibia to Brazil
- Incumbent; Samuel Sheefeni Nuuyoma since January 26, 2016
- Inaugural holder: Patrick Nandago
- Formation: June 18, 2004

The Namibian ambassador in Brasília is the official representative of the Government in Windhoek to the Government of Brazil

== List of representatives ==
Diplomatic accreditation	Ambassador	Observations	President of Namibia	President of Brazil	Term end
June 18, 2004	Patrick Nandago	Mr. Patrick Nandago was appointed the first Namibian Ambassador to the Federative Republic of Brazil and presented his Letters of Credence to H.E. President Luiz Inacio Lula Da Silva on 18 June 2004.	Sam Nujoma	Luiz Inácio Lula da Silva	March 15, 2005
November 7, 2006	Hopelong Ushona Ipinge		Hifikepunye Pohamba	Luiz Inácio Lula da Silva	March 21, 2015
September 8, 2010	Lineekela Josephat Mboti		Hifikepunye Pohamba	Luiz Inácio Lula da Silva	March 21, 2015
January 26, 2016	Samuel Sheefeni Nuuyoma		Hage Geingob	Dilma Rousseff	

== See also ==
- Brazil–Namibia relations
