= Monica Nashandi =

Namibian diplomat and politician

- Born: 12 October 1959 (age 66)
- Other name: nee shivolo
- Citizenship: Namibia
- Education: Diploma in youth and development from university of Zambia in 1983 Masters in diplomatic studies from university of West minster in 2002
- Occupations: Namibia diplomat and Politician
- Organization(s): Acting non executive chairman of Board- Trust Co group holdings limited Board of Director, Africon ( 2007 )
- Notable work: Namibia Ambassador to Scandavian countries ( 1995-1999) Namibia's high commissioner to UK and Ireland ( 1999-2005)
- Children: Anna Svetlana Nashandi Iyambo Erastus Nashandi

Monica Nashandi (née Shivolo born 12 October 1959) is a Namibian diplomat and politician. Nashandi was Namibia's ambassador to Scandinavian countries as well as the former High Commissioner to the United Kingdom. Nashandi was removed from the SWAPO list for the 2009 general election because she had not registered to vote, a requirement under Namibian law. Nashandi was Namibia's ambassador to the United States of America from 2019 to 2020.

== Early life and education ==
Nashandi was born on 12 October 1959 in the village of Ompundja in Oshana Region. As a refugee in 1978, she survived the Battle of Cassinga, a South African airborne attack on SWAPO across the border in Angola. She later received military training and joined the People's Liberation Army of Namibia (PLAN), SWAPO's armed wing during the Namibian War of Independence. Nashandi graduated with a diploma in youth and development from University of Zambia in 1983 and earned a master's degree in diplomatic studies from the University of Westminster in 2002 while on a diplomatic posting.

== Career ==
Following Namibia's independence in 1990, Nashandi served as Deputy Chief of Protocol in the State House of Namibia prior to her appointment to the Ministry of Foreign Affairs as Under-Secretary for Political and Economic Affairs. From 1995 to 1999, she was Namibia's ambassador to Sweden, Norway, Denmark, Finland and Iceland. From 1999 to 2005, she became her country's high commissioner to the United Kingdom and Ireland.

Nashandi has been the acting non-executive chairperson of the board at Trustco Group Holdings Limited since 2006. Trustco Group Holdings is a publicly traded company which provides micro-insurance and financial services. In November 2007, Nashandi was named to the board of directors of Africon, a Namibian engineering firm. At the time of her appointment, she was the only female on the board.

=== Removal from party list ===
At the September 2009 SWAPO party conference, Nashandi was placed 30th on the SWAPO party list for the coming elections for the National Assembly as one of President Hifikepunye Pohamba's ten personal nominations to that list. Because of the Public Service Act which states that public employees must either use vacation time or resign in order to get time off to run for public office, she had no vacation time and was forced to resign from her position as Deputy Executive Director in the State House in order to run for the National Assembly. But Nashandi was nearly guaranteed a place in the National Assembly due to her comfortable position on the SWAPO list.

A month prior to the elections, Nashandi was removed from the SWAPO list when the Electoral Commission of Namibia discovered that Nashandi was not in possession of a valid voter's card and thus not a registered voter, a necessary condition to qualify for election to the National Assembly. Priscilla Beukes, at that time mayor of Mariental, took her place on the list. Days after the removal, the former ambassador called her removal a "technical oversight"; she had not registered to vote in the 2004 general election because she was serving as High Commissioner to the United Kingdom at the time, and foreign missions did not conduct voter's registrations. It was widely expected that Nashandi would register to vote in the 2009 election and be appointed as one of the presidential additional six nominees for the National Assembly, but this did not occur.

== Private life ==
Nashandi is married to a lieutenant colonel in the Namibian Defence Force, who is based in Otavi. Her daughter, Anna Svetlana Nashandi, who was born in 1984 while Nashandi was in exile in Angola, won the 2006 Miss Namibia beauty pageant competition at the Windhoek Country Club Resort. Her son Iyambo Erastus Nashandi was born in 1990.
