= Hendrik Samuel Witbooi =

Namibian revolutionary, Kaptein of the ǀKhowesin (1906–1978)

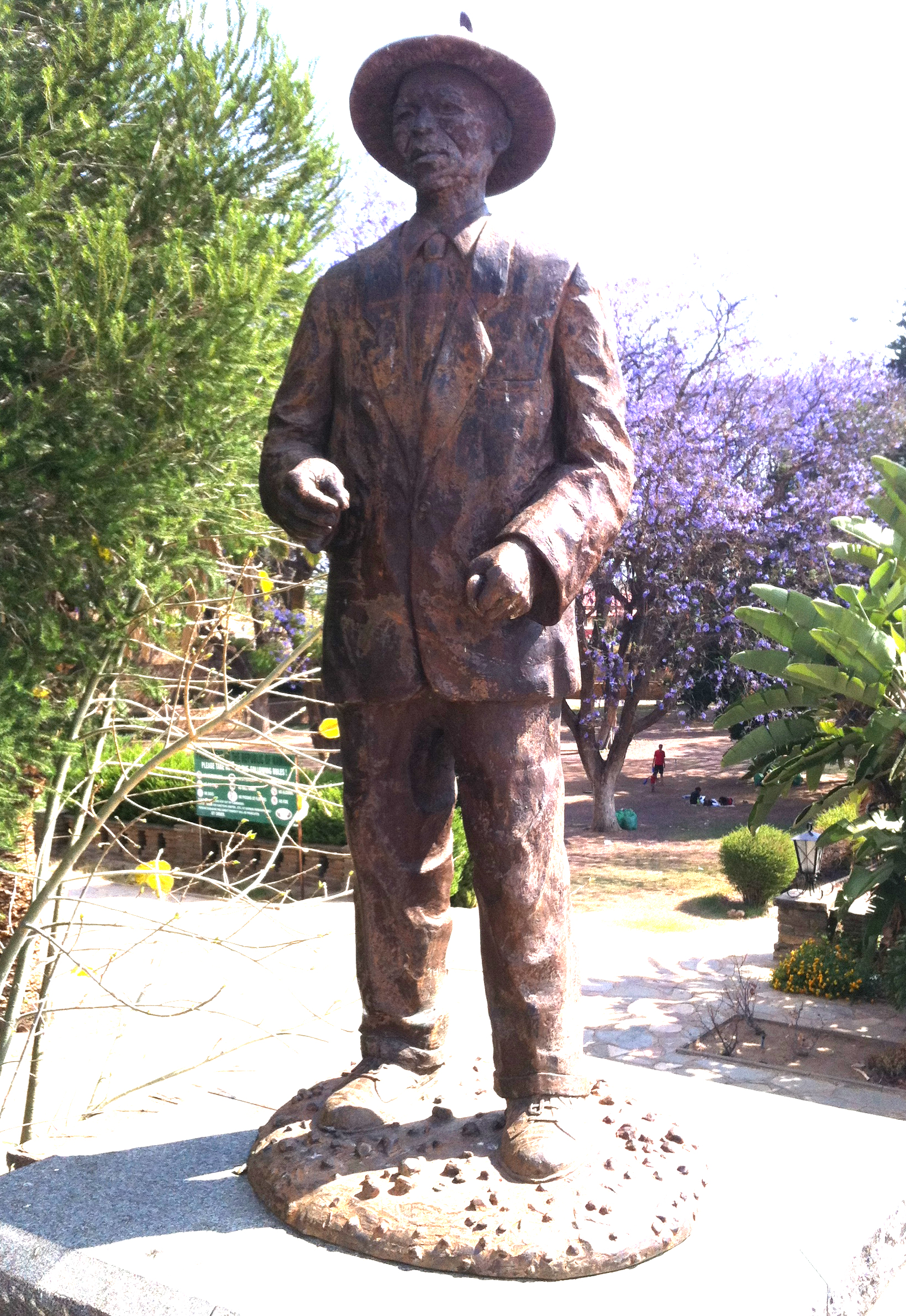
- Monument of Captain Hendrik Samuel Witbooi at Parliament Gardens in Windhoek

Kaptein of the ǀKhowesin
- Reign: 1955 – 29 July 1978
- Predecessor: David Witbooi
- Successor: Hendrik Witbooi, Jr.
- Born: 1 June 1906; Gibeon, German South West Africa
- Died: 29 July 1978 (aged 72)
- Khoekhoe language name: ǃGae-nûb ǃnagamâb ǃNansemab'

Captain Hendrik Samuel Witbooi (Khoekhoe: ǃGae-nûb ǃnagamâb ǃNansemab; 1 June 1906 – 29 July 1978) was the sixth Kaptein of the ǀKhowesin, a subtribe of the Orlam, in the area of South West Africa (SWA), today's Namibia. He was born in Gibeon; Hendrik Witbooi was his grandfather. He was selected to be the successor of his uncle David Witbooi who died in 1955.

Together with Hosea Kutako, Samuel Witbooi was involved in the drafting of a petition to the United Nations in 1947 to put Namibia under British trusteeship. The petition was signed at the occasion of the 1947 Herero Day gathering and subsequently presented to the UN by Reverend Michael Scott, because neither Kutako nor Witbooi were allowed to leave South West African territory. In 1956, Witbooi addressed the UN again, "on behalf of the non-European inhabitants of SWA". The results were that the UN rejected a request to divide South West Africa and allocate its southern parts permanently to South Africa. They also extended their own mandate on South West Africa for one more year.

Witbooi was a strong opponent of the South African system of Bantu Education which deprived black learners of an appropriate access to education. He then established the African Methodist Episcopal Church Private School which used English as medium of instruction. He was a strong opponent of the South African Homeland policy. Furthermore, he aggressively opposed the enforced resettlement of the ǃGami-ǂnun (Bondelswarts) from the Warmbad area to Gibeon. Throughout November 1967 he advised the ǃGami-ǂnun in Warmbad to reject any South African resettlement plans. Witbooi joined SWAPO in 1977 but died not long after that, in 1978. Hendrik Witbooi, Jr. succeeded him as chief of the ǀKhowesin.

Hendrik Samuel Witbooi is regarded a hero of the Namibian struggle for independence. He is known for the quote "I don't want to possess a part of our country — I want to have the whole Namibia," which resulted in a criminal charge laid against him by the South African administration. Outside Windhoek's Tintenpalast there is a statue of him.
