= National Council (Namibia) =

Upper house of the Parliament of Namibia

- 7th National Council

Type
- Type: Upper house of the Parliament of Namibia

History
- Founded: 23 February 1993

Leadership
- Chairperson: Lukas Sinimbo Muha, SWAPO since 15 December 2020
- Deputy Chairperson: Victoria Kauma, SWAPO since 9 December 2019

Structure
- Seats: 42
- Political groups: Government (39) SWAPO (39) Official opposition (2) PDM (2) Other parties (1) UDF (1)
- Length of term: 5 years

Elections
- Voting system: Indirect election by Regional Councils
- First election: 30 November – 3 December 1992
- Last election: 26 November 2025

Meeting place
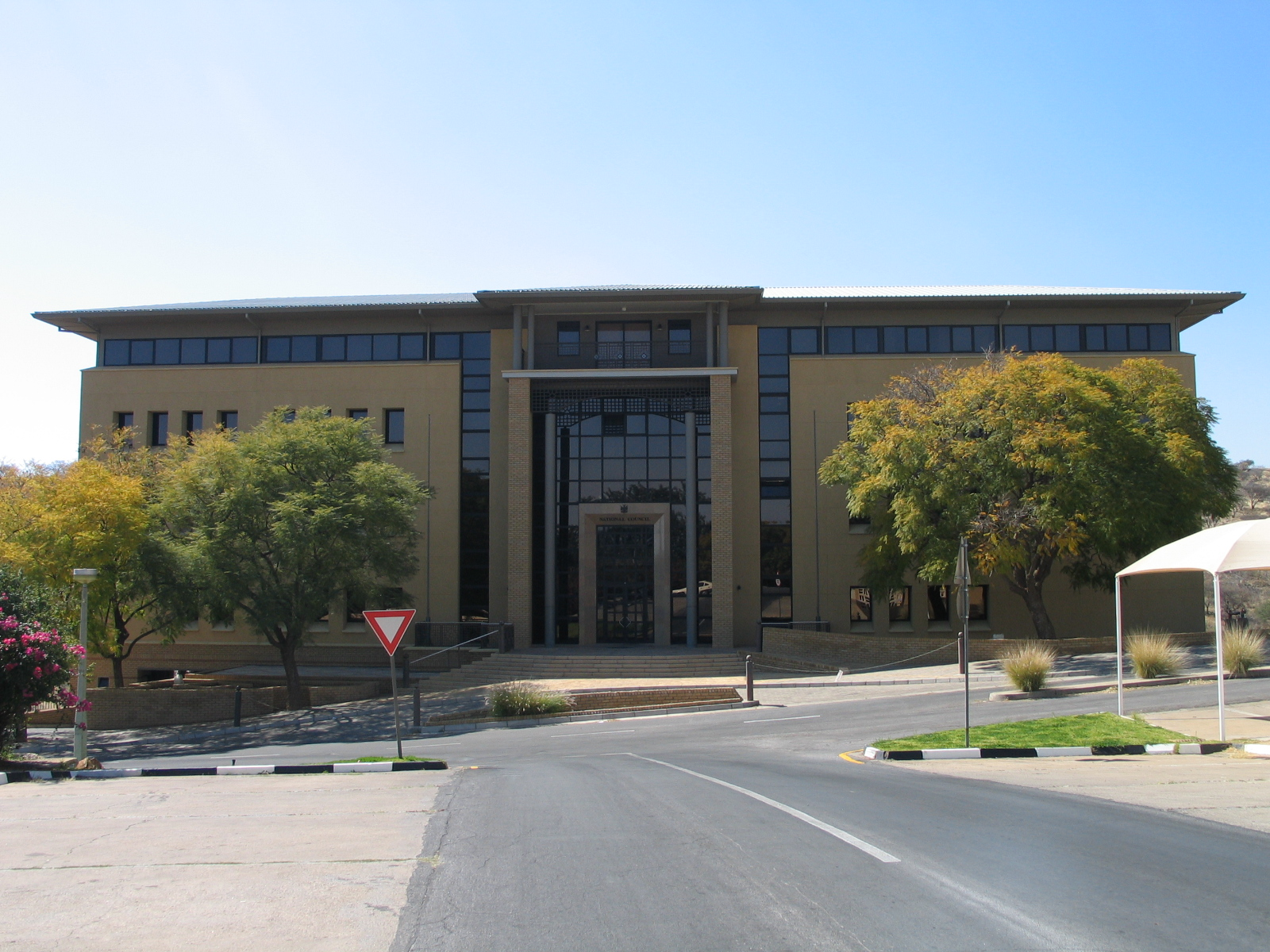
- National Council Building, Windhoek, Khomas Region, Namibia

Website
- Parliament of Namibia

The National Council is the upper chamber of Namibia's bicameral Parliament. It reviews bills passed by the lower chamber and makes recommendations for legislation of regional concern to the lower chamber.

The 42 National Council members are indirectly elected by regional councils for a term of five years. Each of the 14 regional councils chooses three of its members to serve on the National Council. The last regional council elections were held on 26 November 2025.

Political party distribution in the current National Council is as follows:

- South West Africa People's Organisation (SWAPO) - 39 seats
- Popular Democratic Movement (PDM) - 2 seats
- United Democratic Front (UDF) - 1 seat

The National Council meets in the capital Windhoek in the National Council Building next to the Tintenpalast. The chairperson as of December 2020 is Lukas Muha.

== Election results ==
Political Party	Election Year						
Political Party	1992	1998	2004	2010	2015	2020	2025
South-West Africa People's Organisation (SWAPO)	19	21	24	24	40	28	39
Popular Democratic Movement (PDM)	6	4	1	1	1	2	2
United Democratic Front (UDF)	1	1	1	1	-	2	1
National Unity Democratic Organisation (NUDO)	-	-	-	-	1	1	-
Landless People's Movement (LPM)	-	-	-	-	-	6	-
Independent Patriots for Change (IPC)	-	-	-	-	-	2	-
Independent	-	-	-	-	-	1	-
Total	26	26	26	26	42	42	42

== See also ==
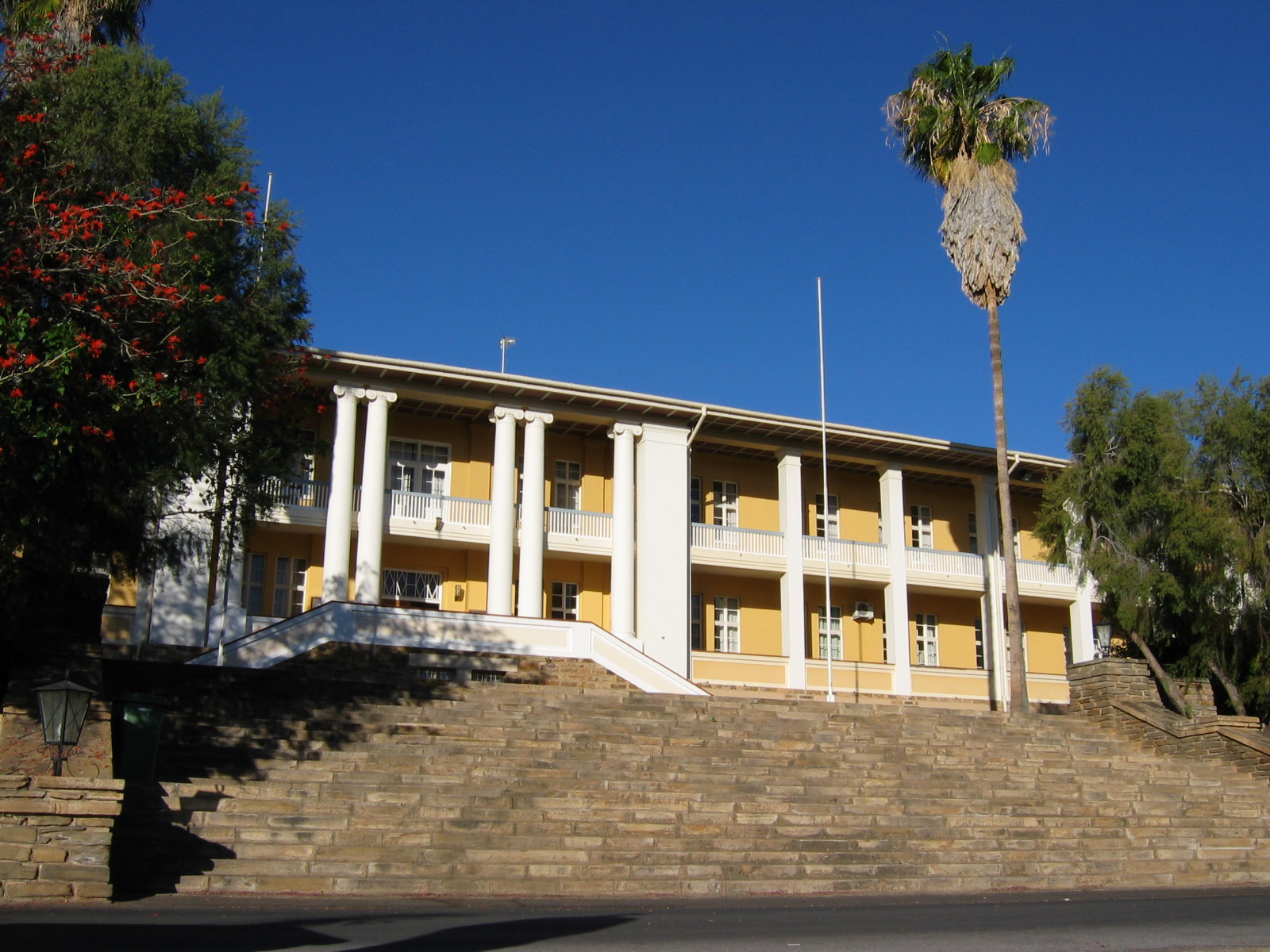
Tintenpalast, the former meeting place of the National Council

- National Assembly of Namibia - the lower chamber of Parliament
- History of Namibia
- Legislative Branch
- List of Chairpersons of the National Council of Namibia
- List of national legislatures
