= Parliament Building, Windhoek =

Building in Namibia

Parliament Building
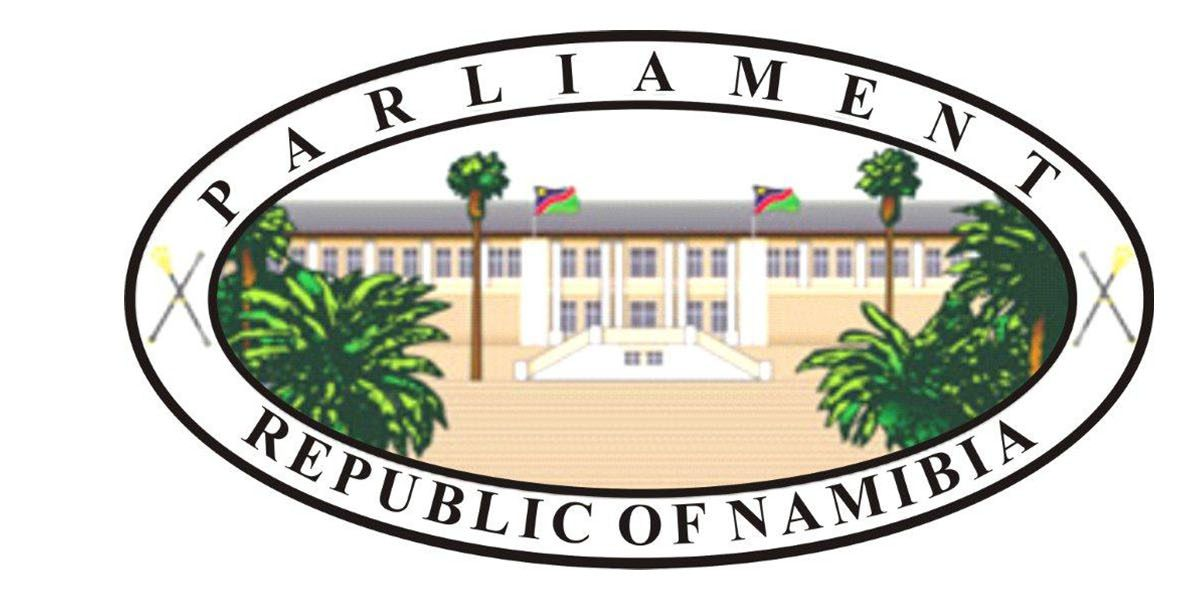
- Logo of Parliament

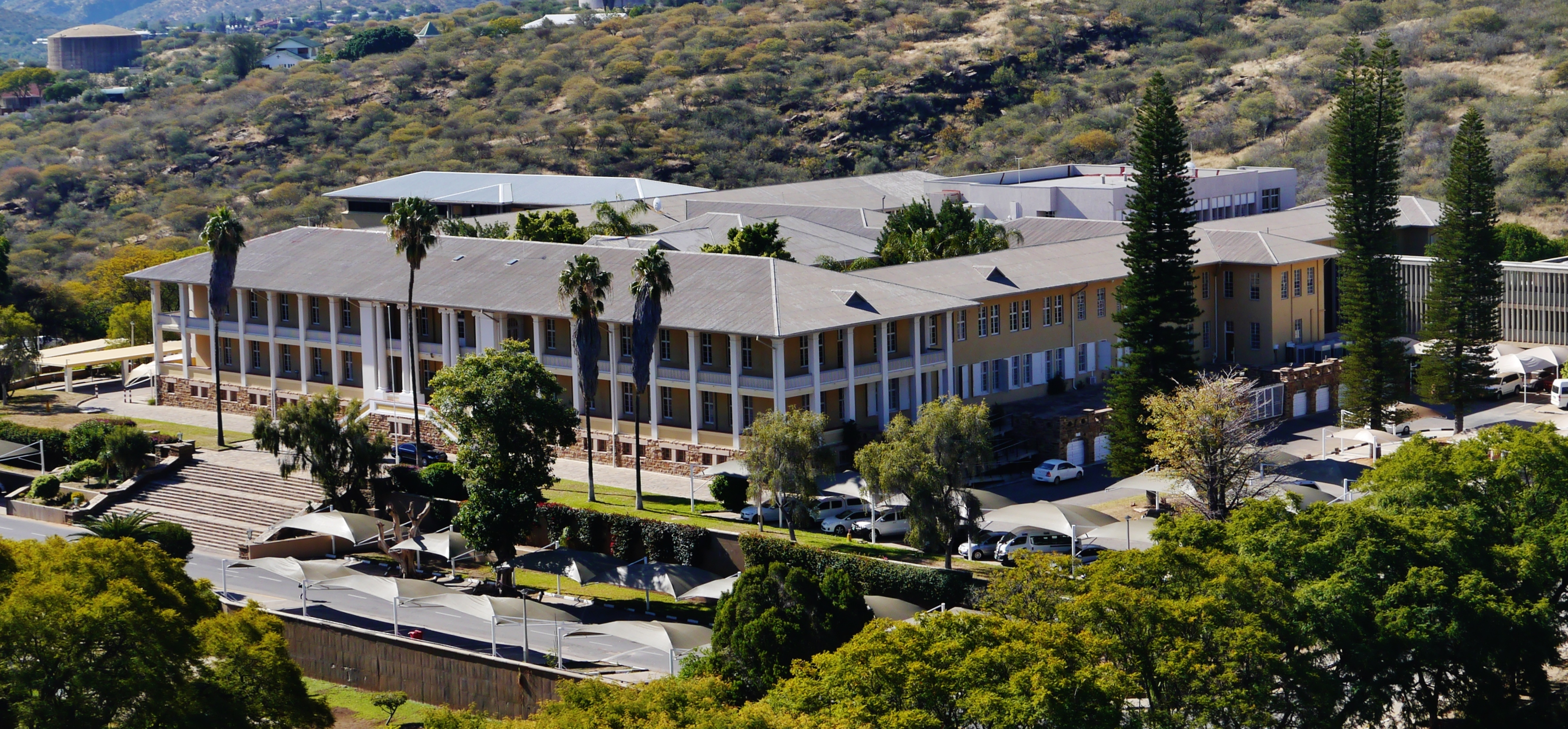
- Front façade viewed from the south-west
- Interactive map of the Parliament Building area
- Former names: Tintenpalast
- Alternative names: Legislative Assembly Building

General information
- Type: Parliament House
- Architectural style: Neoclassical
- Location: 14A Love Street, Windhoek Central Business District, Windhoek, Namibia
- Coordinates: 22.5666°S 17.0893°E
- Construction started: 1912
- Inaugurated: 12 April 1913; 113 years ago
- Renovated: 7 December 2009 – 7 May 2012
- Cost: DEℳ 450,000 (Note: The inflation would be: ℳ450,000 (equivalent to ℳ2,620,846 in 2021)); N$ 1,269,700
- Client: Bruno von Schuckmann (1910)
- Owner: German South West Africa (1913–15); South West Africa (1915–90); Namibia (since 1990)

Design and construction
- Architect: Gottlieb Redecker
- Architecture firm: Sander & Kock

Website
- www.parliament.na

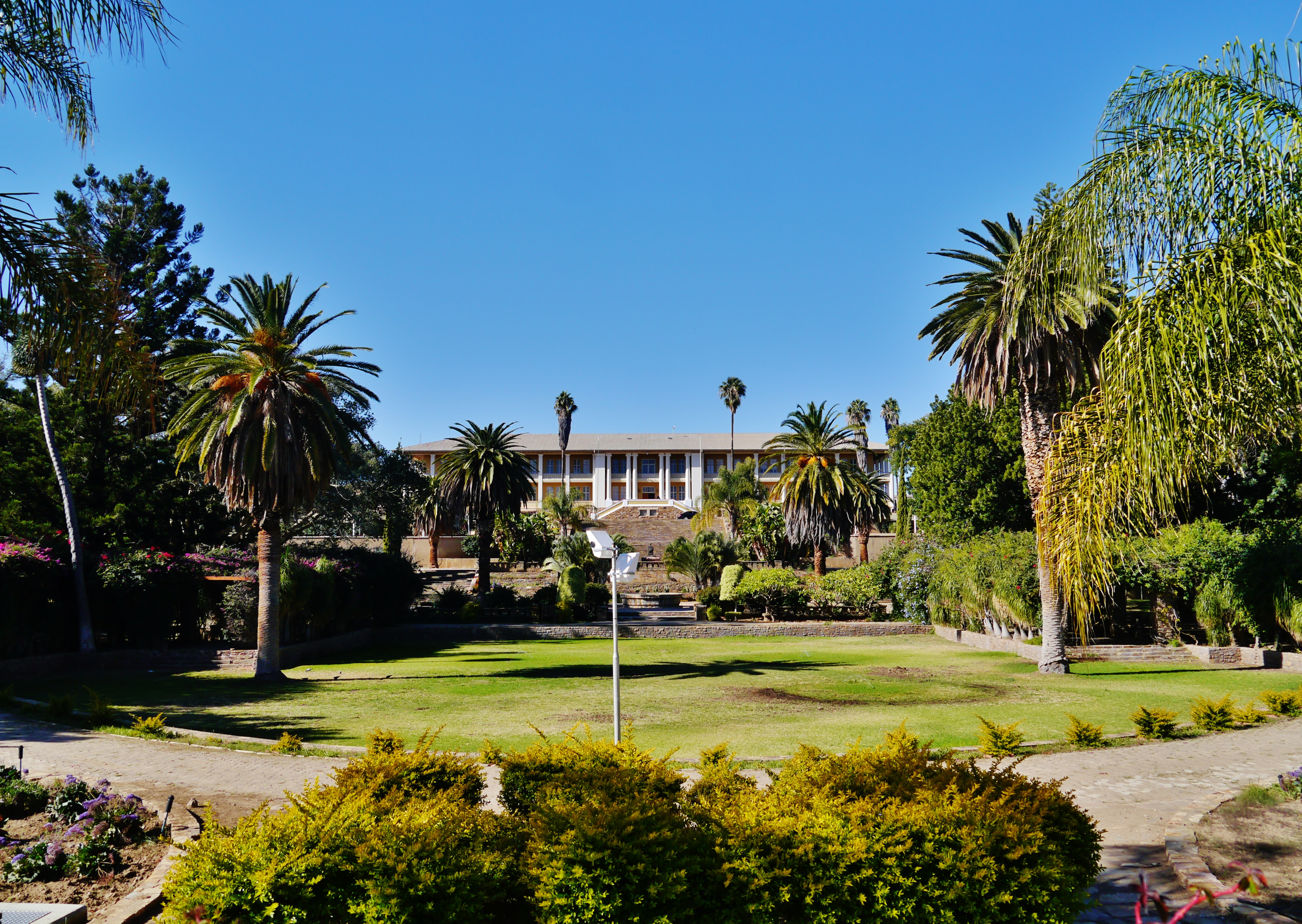
Front view with garden in the image

The Parliament Building, Windhoek, also known as the Tintenpalast (German for Ink Palace), is the seat of both houses of the Parliament of Namibia (the National Council and the National Assembly). It is located in the Namibian capital of Windhoek.

The Tintenpalast, which is located just north of Robert Mugabe Avenue, was designed by German architect Gottlieb Redecker with a Neoclassical front façade and built by the company Sander & Kock between 1912 and 1913 from regional materials as an administration building for the German government, which colonised Namibia at the time. The building project used forced labour by Herero and Nama people who, having survived the Herero and Nama genocide, had been placed in concentration camps.

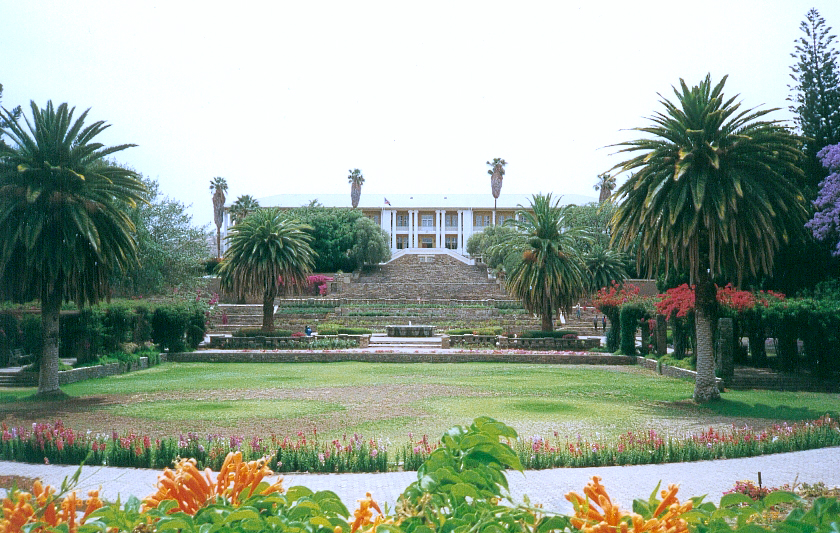
Parliament Building with Parliament Gardens

The building was opened on 12 April 1913. As an allusion to the extensive usage of ink by the workers in the building, it was named "Tintenpalast" or "Ink Palace". When Namibia achieved its independence in 1990, the Tintenpalast became the seat of the National Assembly.

Due to a change to the Constitution in 2014, the number of parliamentarians increased significantly. As a result, there have been calls for a bigger parliament building, since many parliamentarians and support staff are not able to be housed in the Tintenpalast. Moses Ndjarakana argues that the "structure and shape of the Chamber is not conducive to a House of the People" and that the "current state of affairs with regard to office space" is "miserable and undesirable as it contributes to an ineffective service delivery system."

The Tintenpalast is surrounded by the Parliament Gardens, which is very popular among the inhabitants of Windhoek.
