= Walvis Bay Rural =

Electoral constituency in Erongo region, Namibia

Coordinates: 23°13′16.16″S 15°6′22.32″E

Walvis Bay Rural constituency (red) in the Erongo Region

Walvis Bay Rural constituency is a constituency in the Erongo Region of Namibia. It comprises the rural area surrounding the constituency's district capital city of Walvis Bay, and additionally some streets on the outskirts of the city. It had a population of 26,916 in 2011, up from 16,293 in 2001. Walvis Bay Rural covers 9,150 km^{2} (3,530 sq mi) of land. As of 2020 the constituency had 25,746 registered voters.

Walvis Bay Rural was created in 1998. Following a recommendation of the Second Delimitation Commission of Namibia, and in preparation of the 1998 general election, the old Walvis Bay Constituency was split into Walvis Bay Urban and Walvis Bay Rural.

== Inhabitants ==
Walvis Bay Rural constituency includes a string of settlements by the ǂAonin (Southern Topnaar) community, a subtribe of the Nama people. These settlements are situated along the Kuiseb River and include Utuseb and Rooibank.

== Politics ==
Walvis Bay Rural is traditionally a stronghold of the South West Africa People's Organization (SWAPO) party. In the 2004 regional election SWAPO politician Johannes Nangolo received 4,426 of the 5,300 votes cast and became councillor. Councillor Nangolo (SWAPO) was re-elected in the 2010 regional elections with 3,804 votes. His closest challenger was Tjitekuru Joseph of the Rally for Democracy and Progress, who received 646 votes. Nangolo also won the 2015 regional elections with 3,928 votes. Runner-up and only challenger was Joan Valencia Izaaks of the Democratic Turnhalle Alliance (DTA) who received 801 votes.

The 2020 regional election was won by Florian Tegako Donatus of the Independent Patriots for Change (IPC, an opposition party formed in August 2020). He obtained 3,433 votes. The SWAPO candidate, Hilma Tonata Shikongo, came second with 2,318 votes, and Ambrosius Swartbooi of the Landless People's Movement (LPM, an opposition party formed in 2016) came in third with 904 votes.
