= Jan Uixamab =

Jan Uixamab (died 1905) was a tribal leader of the Nama subgroup Topnaar in the region of present-day Namibia during the German colonial period in the 1880s. He became particularly known for his role as a treaty partner of the German colonial administration. He likely died in German captivity in connection with the genocide of the Nama and Herero.

The only known specimen of this prominent Nama leader is held in the Archive of the Berlin Society for Anthropology, Ethnology and Prehistory.

== Background ==
The Topnaar are a community of the Nama people who traditionally lived along the Kuiseb River and in the vicinity of Walvis Bay. During German colonial rule in German South West Africa (from 1884), representatives of the German government and trading companies sought treaty relations with local chiefs to legitimize their claims to land and influence.

== Role in Colonial History ==
Jan Uixamab was one of the signatories of so-called protection treaties concluded between German colonial representatives and local leaders. These treaties granted the German Empire formal control over various territories. In historical documents, Uixamab is mentioned in connection with a Declaration on a Cocoa Field, which he signed together with the Nama leader Cornelius Zwartboy.

== Significance ==
The signing of such treaties by Jan Uixamab and other local leaders marks an early phase of German colonial policy in South West Africa. This phase later transitioned into violent suppression of the indigenous population.

== Sources ==
Information about Jan Uixamab is limited and comes primarily from colonial archives, historical collections, and digital projects addressing German colonialism.
