= Topnaar people =

People group in Namibia

The Topnaar people (ǂAonin) are a clan of the Nama people in Namibia. Their settlements are all situated on the Kuiseb River in the Erongo Region of central Namibia, the largest one is Utuseb.

== History ==
The Topnaars began settling in the area of Walvis Bay and along the Kuiseb River during the start of the 19th century. They first occupied the area at the mouth of the Swakop River, today the city of Swakopmund, and moved south beyond Walvis Bay to the Kuiseb mouth between 1820 and 1830. A small faction moved upriver to Sandfontein but was attacked and driven away by warriors of the Red Nation. They receded to Rooibank (Scheppmannsdorf during Imperial Germany's colonial rule of South-West Africa).

Missionary Heinrich Schmelen and Captain Amraal Lambert of the Kaiǀkhauan (Khauas Nama) visited the Topnaar around 1824 or 1825 while searching for a hospitable place at the coast to improve logistics for the support of the missionaries in the hinterland.

== Culture and living conditions ==
ǃNara melons which grow on the banks of the Kuiseb are the primary staple food of the Topnaars. Apart from ǃNara products which are also sold to tourists, most Topnaar people depend on livestock farming and old-age grants.

Seth Kooitjie was the Chief of the Topnaar people until his death in February 2019. The traditional authority gains money from tourism concessions and fishing quotas in their tribal area but these monies have yet to bring about upliftment of the community which lives without access to sewerage and electricity.

== Notable members ==
- Jan Uixamab (died 1905), Topnaar chief
