= Us-Hoogte Pass =

Mountain pass in Namibia

Us-Hoogte Pass is a mountain pass on D1982, a secondary gravel road through the Khomas Highland from Windhoek to Walvis Bay in Namibia. The road, which runs along the Kuiseb River, has a maximum slope of 1:10 and is therefore not suitable for motorized trailer traffic.
