= Utuseb =

Utuseb is a small settlement in the Erongo Region in western central Namibia. It is situated in the Namib Desert, approximately 40 kilometres (25 mi) from Walvis Bay on the banks of Kuiseb River. Utuseb has approximately 700 inhabitants and belongs to the Walvis Bay Rural electoral constituency. The people living here belong to the ǂAonin (Southern Topnaar) community, a subtribe of the Nama people.

== History ==
Topnaars began settling in the area of Walvis Bay and along the Kuiseb River during the start of the 19th century. They first occupied the area at the mouth of the Swakop River, today the city of Swakopmund, and moved south beyond Walvis Bay to the Kuiseb mouth between 1820 and 1830. A small faction moved upriver to Sandfontein but was attacked and driven away by warriors of the Red Nation. They receded to Rooibank (Scheppmannsdorf during Imperial Germany's colonial rule of South-West Africa).

Missionary Heinrich Schmelen and Captain Amraal Lambert of the Kaiǀkhauan (Khauas Nama) visited the Topnaar around 1824 or 1825 while searching for a hospitable place at the coast to improve logistics for the support of the missionaries in the hinterland.

The place was originally called Iduseb (Khoekhoe: people want to live there but there is no water) but as its spelling and pronunciation changed, so did the meaning of the name: Utuseb in Khoekhoe means something half-round that is situated in a round area.

A memorial stone of the Topnaar, the Ebenesser ǁHaibeb Gedenksteen (Afrikaans and Khoekhoe: Captain ǁHaibeb Memorial Stone) is situated in the settlement. It was erected in 1982 and bears the inscription "So far the Lord has helped", as well as the symbols for the ǂAonin (a palm tree) and the Hurinin (a fish).

== Economy and infrastructure ==
The settlement is home to JB Brandt Primary School, a boarding school established in 1978.

Utuseb has no improved water and sanitation and is not electrified. Cell phone reception is very poor. The school owns the settlement's only land line telephone. Residents rely on harvesting ǃNara melons, their primary staple food, on livestock farming, and old-age grants. ǃNara products are also sold to tourists in Walvis Bay.
