= Carl Koch =

Carl Koch may refer to:

- Carl Koch (director) (1892–1963), German film director and writer
- Carl Koch (architect) (1912–1998), American architect
- Carl Ludwig Koch (1778–1857), German entomologist and arachnologist
- Karl Koch (1904-1970), Austrian entomologist

== See also ==
- Karl Koch (disambiguation)
