= Tschudi mine =

- Location within Namibia
- Location: Oshikoto Region, Namibia; 19.262°S 17.514°E
- Products: Copper
- Company: Weatherly International PLC

The Tschudi mine is a large copper mine located in the North of Namibia in Oshikoto Region. Tschudi represents one of the largest copper reserve in Namibia, having estimated reserves of 70 million tonnes of ore grading 0.7% copper.

== See also ==
- Matchless Mine, Namibia
