= Hendrik Tseib =

Hendrik Tseib (died 1883) was a Nama leader of the ǃKharo-ǃOan (Keetmanshoop Nama) people in the 19th century and is remembered as the founder of the settlement that later became Keetmanshoop.

== Life ==
In 1850, Tseib and his community permanently settled around the Swartmodder fountain after separating from the Red Nation. His community became known as the ǃKharo-ǃOan or Keetmanshoop Nama.

According to historical accounts, the area was originally know by the Nama name ǂNuǂgoes, commonly translated as "black mud" or "Swartmodder". The name referred to the muddy water and iron spring in the area. Tseib is associated with discovering the spring and bringing his people to settle there.

Later, in 1866, the German missionary group Rhenish Mission established a mission station in the settlement. The place eventually became know as Keetmanshoop, named after the German businessman Johann Keetmans, who financially supported the mission. Tseib was baptised in 1878.

He died in 1883 in Keetmanshoop.

== Commemoration ==
Today, his contribution is remembered through a bronze statue in Keetmanshoop Central Park, unveiled in 2016. The statue honours him as a late chief of the ǃKharo-ǃOans Nama and as a founder associated with Keetmanshoop.
