= Matchless Mine, Namibia =

Mine in Khomas Region, Namibia

Matchless mine
- Location within Namibia
- Location: Windhoek Rural, Khomas Region, Namibia; 22.69167°S 16.84639°E
- Company: Weatherly International PLC

The Matchless Mine is a copper mine in Khomas Region, Namibia, 30 kilometres (19 mi) southwest of Windhoek. It was operated by Newmont until 1983 when it was shut down due to "strategic and economic" reasons.

In 2006, the mine was acquired by the London-based mining company Weatherly International PLC through its purchase of Ongopolo Mining and Processing Limited. The mine was placed on care and maintenance in 2008 due to low copper prices.

In 2012, Weatherly announced its intention to reopen the mine. It estimated that the mine would produce more than 3,000 tonnes per year. It is powered by the nearby Friedenau Dam. The mine was placed on care and maintenance again in September 2015.

== See also ==
- Mining in Namibia
- Tschudi mine
