= Weatherly International =

British mining company

Weatherly International plc
- Company type: Public limited company
- Industry: Metals and mining
- Founded: 2000
- Parent: East China Mineral Exploration & Development (50.1%)
- Subsidiaries: China Africa Resources Namibia plc (90%)
- Website: www.weatherlyplc.com

Weatherly International plc is a British mining company which owns several copper mines in Namibia. Its operations include the Matchless mine, Otjihase mine, Kombat mine, and Tschudi mine.

In 2006, Weatherly acquired the operations of Ongopolo Mining & Processing Ltd. At the time, the company was backed by hedge funds including RAB Capital plc and Matterhorn Investment Management, which together owned about one third of the company.

In 2008, due to declining copper prices, Weatherly closed two of its mines. In 2009, Weatherly sold a controlling stake the company to the East China Mineral Exploration and Development Bureau in order to fund the reopening of their mines. In 2010, Weatherly sold the Tsumeb smelter to Dundee Precious Metals Inc. In 2011, Weatherly and East China Mineral Exploration and Development Bureau announced a joint venture named China Africa Resources Namibia to develop the Berg Aukas lead/zinc/vanadium mine, which was previously open from 1959 to 1978. This subsidiary was also listed on the Alternative Investment Market. In December 2016, interest in the Berg Aukas mine was returned to shareholders, and the China Africa Resources Namibia changed its name to Pembridge Resources.

Weatherly was traded on the UK Alternative Investment Market for some time, but trading has been suspended since 2015, following news of metallurgical problems at the Tschudi mine. Following deferred loan repayments in March 2018, CEO Craig Thomas announced his resignation from the company. Around this time Weatherly entered insolvency.

As of January 2020, workers at the Tschudi mine expected the mine to close by March due to Weatherly's lack of funds.
