= Friedenau Dam =

Dam in Khomas Region, Namibia

- Location within Namibia
- Official name: Friedenau Dam
- Country: Namibia
- Location: 38 km (24 mi) south-west of Windhoek, Khomas Region
- Coordinates: 22°41′47″S 16°44′36″E
- Opening date: 1972

Dam and spillways
- Type of dam: Gravity concrete
- Impounds: Kuiseb River

Reservoir
- Total capacity: 6.723 million cubic metres (8,793,000 cu yd)
- Surface area: 8.304 square kilometres (3.206 sq mi)

Friedenau Dam is a gravity concrete dam in Khomas Region, Namibia. Located 38 kilometres (24 mi) southwest of Windhoek, it dams the Kuiseb River and provides water to nearby Matchless Mine. It has a capacity of 6.723 million cubic metres (8,793,000 cu yd) and was completed in 1972, when the territory was occupied by South Africa.
