= Karl Koch =

Karl Koch may refer to:

- Carl Koch (director) (1892–1963), also spelled Karl Koch, German film director, writer
- Karl Koch (botanist) (1809–1879), German botanist
- Karl Koch (cyclist) (1910–1944), German cyclist
- Karl Koch (Fallschirmjäger) (1918–1944), member of the Fallschirmjäger during World War II and recipient of the Knight's Cross of the Iron Cross
- Karl Koch (hacker) (1965–1989), German computer hacker from the 1980s
- Karl Koch (Weezer assistant) (born 1969), roadie and historian of the band Weezer
- Karl-Otto Koch (1897–1945), commandant of the Nazi concentration camp at Buchenwald
- Karl-Rudolf Koch (born 1935), German geodesist
- Karl Christian Koch (born 1952), Danish swimmer

== See also ==
- Carl Koch (disambiguation)
