= Joachim von Heydebreck =

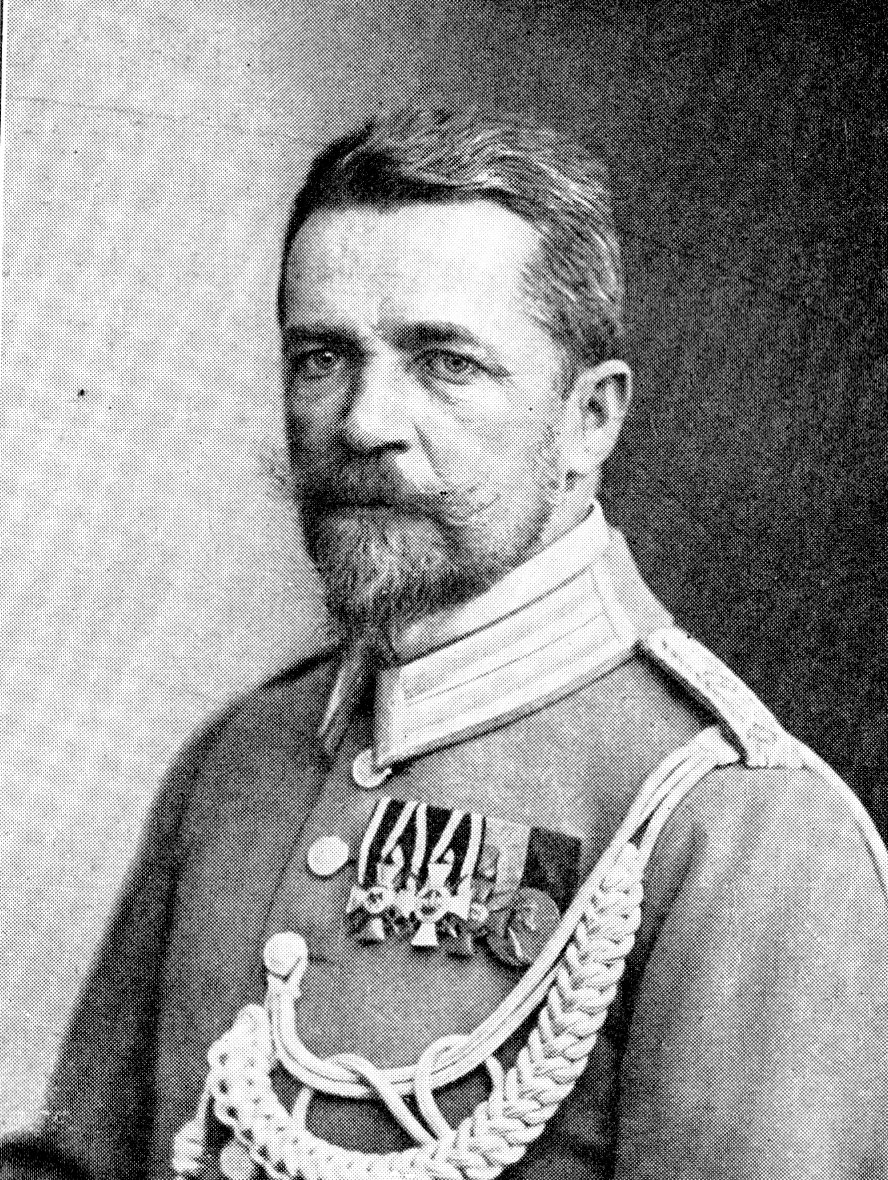
- Joachim von Heydebreck as a captain (Hauptmann) of the Schutztruppe
- Born: 6 October 1861; Schwedt, Province of Brandenburg, Kingdom of Prussia, German Confederation
- Died: 12 November 1914 (aged 53); Kalkfontein-Süd, German South West Africa
- Relatives: ∞ 1907 Ruth, widowed Selle, née von Werder (1881–1912)
- Military career
- Allegiance: Kingdom of Prussia; German Empire
- Branch: Prussian Army; Schutztruppe
- Rank: Lieutenant Colonel
- Conflicts: Battle of Grootberg (1897–98); Hottentot War; World War I

Joachim Friedrich von Heydebreck (6 October 1861 – 12 November 1914) was a German military officer who was born in Schwedt and grew up in Zützen.

== Life ==
Joachim was the son of Prussian Lieutenant General Henning Friedrich Sigismund von Heydebreck (1828–1904) and his wife Anna, née von Colmar (1837–1879). He had four siblings and one half-brother.

Heydebreck joined the 2nd Guard Field Artillery Regiment in Berlin in 1880, was commanded to the 6th Baden Infantry Regiment "Kaiser Friedrich III." No. 114 in Konstanz on 1 April 1893 for one year, and then returned to the 3rd Battery of his regiment. On 27 July 1896, he volunteered to serve in colonial German Southwest Africa. He commanded a company of the I. (mounted) Field Artillery Battalion under Major von Uthmann during the Herero Wars, and in April 1911 became deputy commanding officer and in November 1912 commander of the Schutztruppe as successor to Ludwig von Estorff.

With the outbreak of the First World War in 1914, he fought with the Schutztruppe against the forces of South African Prime Minister Louis Botha and Minister of War Jan Smuts. In peacetime, the Schutztruppe comprised 1,800 men; reinforced by the territorial police, reservists, and the Landsturm, its strength was increased to nearly 6,000 men. Leading a column of 300 men, Heydebreck secured the Schutztruppe’s only victory in South West Africa at the Battle of Sandfontein. Employing unconventional methods, he attempted to hold back the numerically superior South Africans—General Botha commanded 50,000 men and 15,000 vehicles. His motto became: "A Schutztruppe soldier can do anything; give him some wire, a pair of pliers, and a few tin cans, and he can build a submarine out of them!"

== Death ==
Before the armistice between Governor Seitz and General Botha was concluded at the 500-kilometer mark of the Otavi Railway, von Heydebreck was severely injured on 9 November 1914 in an accident in Kalkfontein-Süd caused by the explosion of a homemade rifle grenade fired by his own men during a test shooting. Despite several emergency operations, Joachim von Heydebreck could not be saved and passed away on 12 November 1914 in Kalkfontein. Von Heydebreck was succeeded as commander of the Schutztruppe by Victor Franke.

== Awards, decorations and honours ==
- Prussian Centenary Medal 1897
- Red Eagle Order, 4th Class with Swords (PRAO4X/PrA4X)
- Order of the Crown (Prussia), 3rd Class with Swords (PKO3X)
- Prussian Long Service Cross for 25 years
- Saxon Albert Order, Knight 1st Class with Swords (SA3aX)
- Friedrich Order, Knight 1st Class with Swords (WF3aX)
- South West Africa Commemorative Medal
- Knight of Honour (Ehrenritter) of the Order of Saint John on 5 August 1909

=== Honours ===
- Von-Heydebreck-Straße in Munich (Waldtrudering)

== Sources ==
- Joachim von Heydebreck, 2013, namibiana.de
