= Walvis Bay Urban =

Electoral constituency in the Erongo region of eastern central Namibia

Coordinates: 22°57′0.06″S 14°30′35.46″E

Walvis Bay Urban constituency (red) in the Erongo Region

Walvis Bay Urban is a constituency in the Erongo Region of Namibia, comprising most of the city of Walvis Bay. It had a population of 35,828 in 2011, up from 27,941 in 2001. Walvis Bay Urban covers 18.9 km^{2} (7.3 sq mi) of land. With all arid surroundings belonging to the Walvis Bay Rural constituency it is by far the smallest and most densely populated constituency in Erongo Region. As of 2020 the constituency had 25,311 registered voters.

Walvis Bay Urban was created in 1998. Following a recommendation of the Second Delimitation Commission of Namibia, and in preparation of the 1998 general election, the old Walvis Bay Constituency was split into Walvis Bay Urban and Walvis Bay Rural.

== Politics ==
Walvis Bay is traditionally a stronghold of the South West Africa People's Organization (SWAPO) party. SWAPO politician Hafeni Ndemula has represented the constituency from its establishment in 1998 until 2019. In the 2004 regional election he received 5,728 of the 6,502 votes cast. In the 2010 regional elections, Ndemula was again re-elected with 4,254 votes. His only challenger was Sippora Ndeshihala Kamati of the Rally for Democracy and Progress (RDP), who received 789 votes. Ndemula also won the 2015 regional elections with 3,719 votes. Clementia Hababeb of the Democratic Turnhalle Alliance (DTA) came second with 461 votes, and Cornelius John Jansen (RDP) obtained 192.

After councillor Ndemula was fielded as a parliamentary candidate in the 2019 Namibian general election, a by-election became necessary for Walvis Bay Urban because Namibian electoral law prohibits sitting councillors and members of the public service to run for a seat in parliament. The by-election was conducted on 15 January 2020. Knowledge Ipinge, an independent candidate, won with 1,636 votes, followed by Sirie Topulathana (SWAPO, 1,313 votes). Jason Iilonga (independent) and Richard Hoaeb (Popular Democratic Movement (PDM)) also ran and gained 436 and 208 votes, respectively. The 2020 regional election was won by Deriou Andred Benson of the Independent Patriots for Change (IPC, an opposition party formed in August 2020). He obtained 4,531 votes. The SWAPO candidate, Miina Teuthigilua Hangula, came second with 2,705 votes. Ipinge, the sitting councillor, ended third with 947 votes.
