= Gobabeb =

Research station in the Namib Desert

Coordinates: 23°33′S 15°02′E

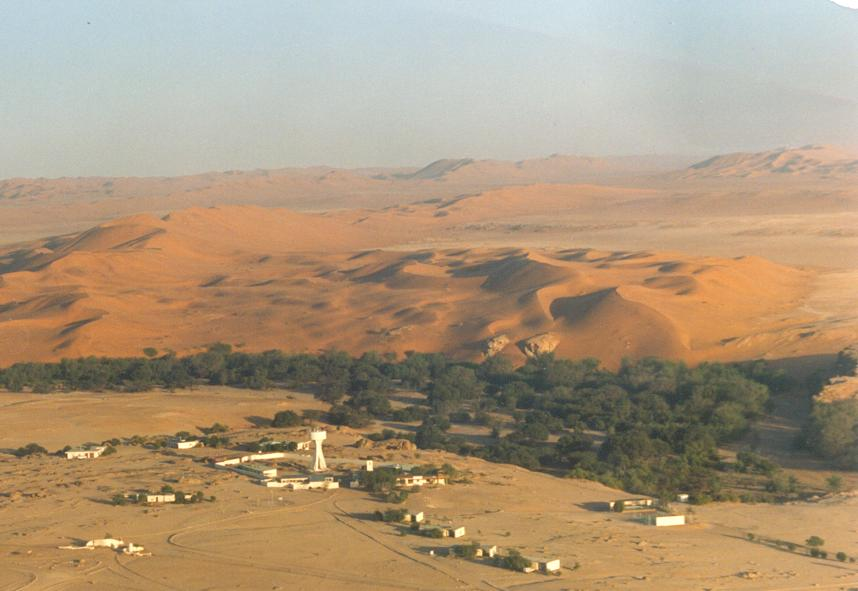
Aerial view of Gobabeb Namib Research Foundation

The Gobabeb Namib Research Institute, short: Gobabeb, is a centre for dry land training and research in Namibia. It is located in the Namib Desert, 120 kilometres (75 mi) south-east of Walvis Bay.

Gobabeb was founded by the Austrian entomologist Charles Koch in 1962. Since 1998 Gobabeb has been a joint venture between the Ministry of Environment and Tourism (MET) and the Desert Research Foundation Namibia (DRFN). Gobabeb conducts research in the fields of climate, ecology and geomorphology. It also tests, demonstrates and promotes appropriate technologies. By conducting training courses, Gobabeb aims to improve the public awareness and knowledge of dry land ecology and environmental issues. The station consists of permanent researchers, students, and interns, as well as short time visitors such as school and university groups, and tourists. Gobabeb also hosts film crews, journalists and artists.

== Station ==
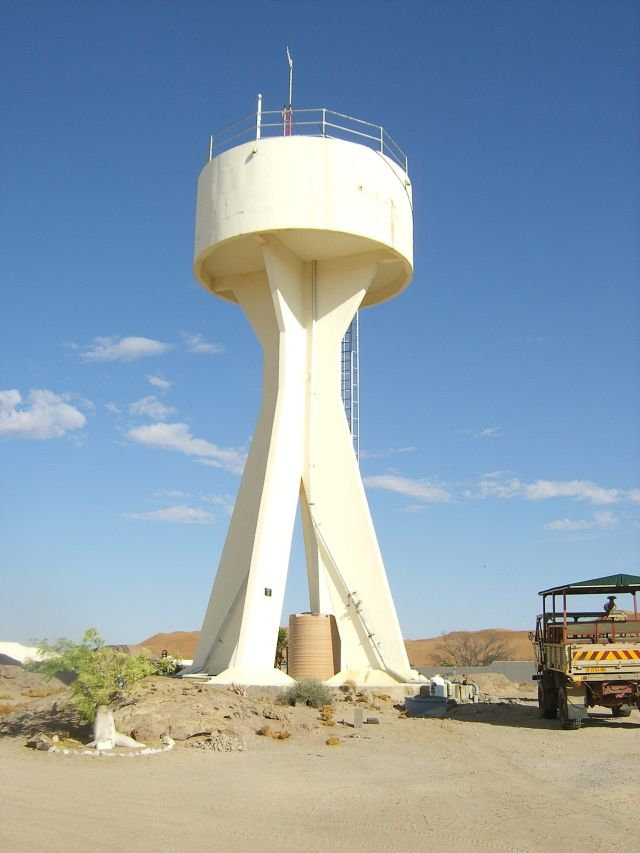
The watertower of Gobabeb

The Station is located 120 kilometres (75 mi) south-east of Walvis Bay in Namibia's largest nature reserve, the Namib-Naukluft National Park. Gobabeb lies at the meeting point of three different ecosystems: the ephemeral Kuiseb River, the Sand Dunes Sea to the south and the gravel plains to the north. This offers an excellent diversity of environments in which to conduct research.

The station consists of the community research center, a library, laboratories, an office block, a meeting hall, the iconic water tower, staff houses and accommodations for visitors.

=== Climate ===
As the station is located in the Namib desert, the climate is hyperarid with an average annual precipitation of 23.8 mm, about 65% during the summer months (December to May). In 2010/2011 an extreme rainfall of about 165 millimetres was measured during rainy season. With each average monthly temperature above 18 °C, in Köppen climate classification, the climate is considered as tropical. With an average annual temperature of 21.4 °C, the climate is nearly 6 °C warmer than at the temperate coast (15.5 °C at Walvis Bay). At about 400 m above sea level - given that Gobabeb is about 60 km from the coast - it is much less under the influence of the cold coastal ocean Benguela current than coastal areas such as Walvis Bay. A cold coastal ocean current cools the oceanic air. The latter being cooled, water vapour in that air may become liquid water. Therefore, clouds and particularly fogs may appear, hugely diminishing insolation and thus temperature. Thus cold ocean currents along western coasts of continents doubly cool these coasts : by their own cold and by the nebulosity (due to clouds including fogs and mists) they bring. For instance Walvis Bay has 140 days of fog per year while Gobabeb has "only" 94 days. Gobabeb's remoteness from the Atlantic explains why it is significantly warmer than the Namibian coast (Walvis Bay average temperature is only 15.4 °C) despite being at a greater altitude.

Climate data for Gobabeb, Namibia
Month	Jan	Feb	Mar	Apr	May	Jun	Jul	Aug	Sep	Oct	Nov	Dec	Year
Record high °C (°F)	40.4 (104.7)	39.7 (103.5)	42.3 (108.1)	39.4 (102.9)	37.0 (98.6)	33.0 (91.4)	34.8 (94.6)	37.4 (99.3)	40.3 (104.5)	40.6 (105.1)	39.6 (103.3)	41.9 (107.4)	42.3 (108.1)
Mean daily maximum °C (°F)	31.6 (88.9)	31.6 (88.9)	33.5 (92.3)	31.5 (88.7)	30.7 (87.3)	26.9 (80.4)	26.9 (80.4)	27.6 (81.7)	29.1 (84.4)	29.5 (85.1)	30.5 (86.9)	31.2 (88.2)	30.1 (86.2)
Daily mean °C (°F)	23.2 (73.8)	23.2 (73.8)	24.8 (76.6)	23.0 (73.4)	22.6 (72.7)	19.1 (66.4)	18.5 (65.3)	19.0 (66.2)	19.9 (67.8)	20.2 (68.4)	21.1 (70.0)	22.2 (72.0)	21.4 (70.5)
Mean daily minimum °C (°F)	14.9 (58.8)	14.8 (58.6)	16.0 (60.8)	14.4 (57.9)	14.5 (58.1)	11.2 (52.2)	10.1 (50.2)	10.4 (50.7)	10.6 (51.1)	11.0 (51.8)	11.7 (53.1)	13.2 (55.8)	12.7 (54.9)
Record low °C (°F)	10.4 (50.7)	9.4 (48.9)	9.9 (49.8)	5.1 (41.2)	5.2 (41.4)	2.2 (36.0)	2.1 (35.8)	3.0 (37.4)	3.6 (38.5)	5.4 (41.7)	4.8 (40.6)	8.6 (47.5)	2.1 (35.8)
Average precipitation mm (inches)	3.3 (0.13)	0.6 (0.02)	6.4 (0.25)	1.5 (0.06)	2.5 (0.10)	0.7 (0.03)	0.5 (0.02)	2.6 (0.10)	2.7 (0.11)	0.8 (0.03)	1.0 (0.04)	1.2 (0.05)	23.8 (0.94)
Average precipitation days (≥ 0.1 mm)	2.6	1.0	1.8	1.2	1.0	0.6	0.6	0.6	1.0	0.4	0.4	0.6	11.8
Average relative humidity (%)	59	60	51	47	36	40	41	45	50	52	53	57	49
Mean monthly sunshine hours	331.7	299.5	325.5	306.0	319.3	297.0	313.1	306.9	297.0	328.6	339.0	353.4	3,817
Percentage possible sunshine	80	83	86	89	94	93	93	88	83	84	86	84	87
Source: SCIENT. PAP. NAMIB DESERT RES. STN, NO. 38

=== Appropriate technology ===
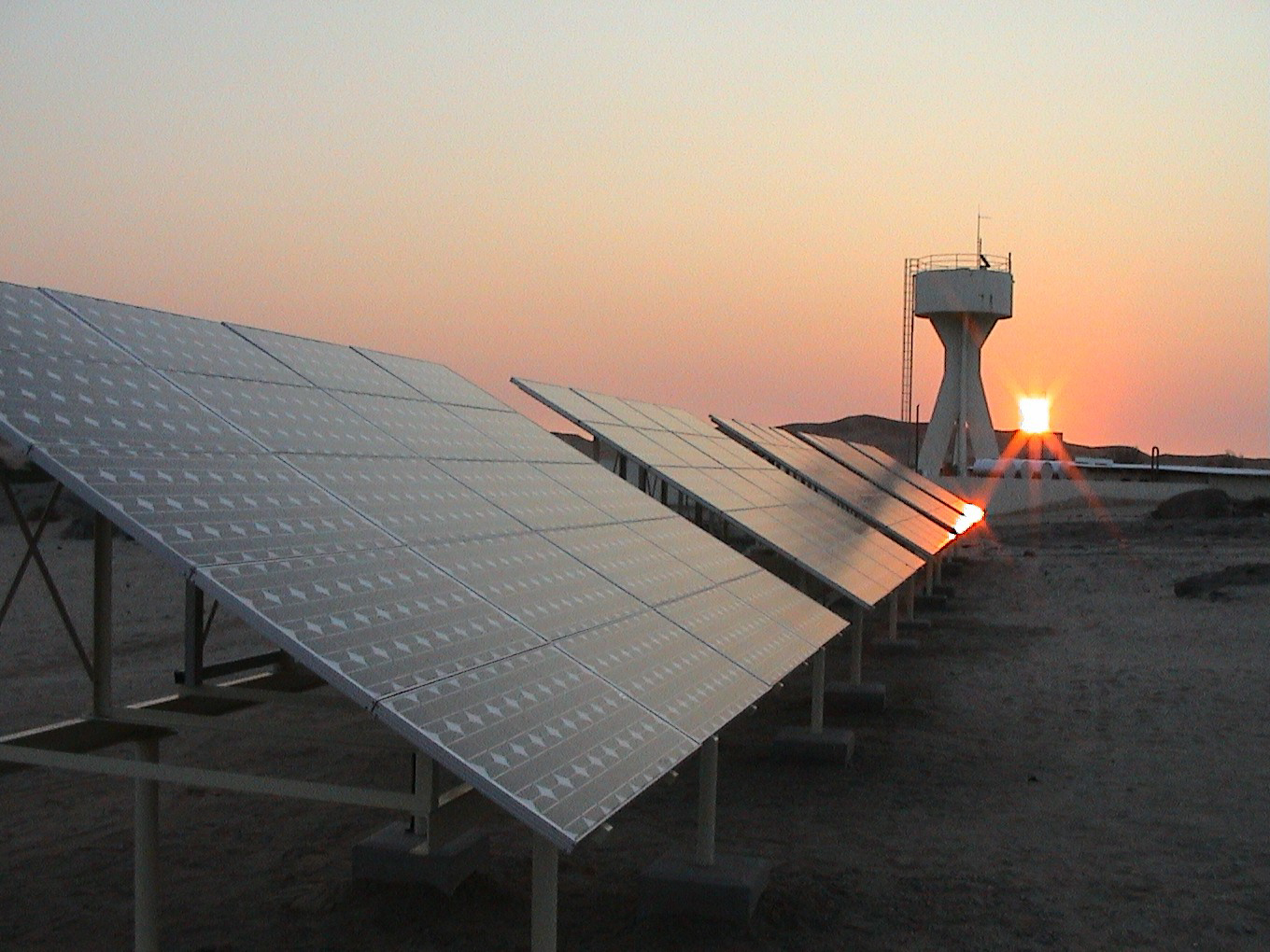
A part of the "Demonstration Project at Gobabeb of Renewable Energy and Energy Efficiency" (DeGREEE) Project: The solar panels

The Gobabeb Namib Research Institute has been built as an example of appropriate technology, which shows how sustainable development can be achieved in daily life. It demonstrates techniques that are applicable at community and commercial/industrial levels. The following systems at Gobabeb are installed under the heading of appropriate technology:

- A solar-diesel hybrid energy system, consisting of 370 solar panels, 60 lead acid batteries and two diesel generators. Through this system, more than 90% of all energy used at Gobabeb, mainly for electricity and water heating, is provided by the sun.
- A water recycling system. All sewage water from the station goes into a trickling filter system and gets used again.
- Fog harvesting. With the help of different kinds of nets, fog water is harvested at Gobabeb. One net can gather up to 3.3 litres of water per square meter on a foggy night. This method might have practical application in the Topnaar settlements along the Kuiseb River.
- Appropriate buildings. New buildings are made of clay bricks which are made from silt of the Kuiseb River. The thick walls of these bricks are thermally ideal for the desert, being warm in winter and cool in summer.
- Waste management. All organic waste is fed to goats belonging to the Topnaar community. Recyclable waste like glass, metals, plastics and paper are taken to Walvis Bay where they are handed to recycling agencies linked to the Walvis Bay Municipality.
- Solar cooking. Gobabeb uses two different types of solar cookers, box cookers and a parabolic cooker, all of which do not require any electricity.

=== Library ===
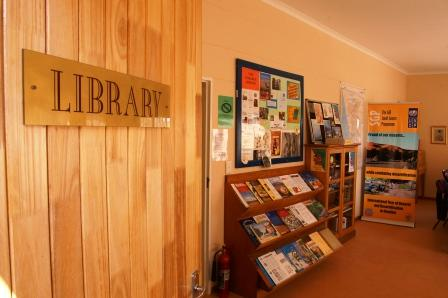
The Gobabeb Centre Library

The Gobabeb Centre Library is built for researchers, students and staff, working in and around Gobabeb, as well being open to interested visitors. It provides access to information and works done in and around Gobabeb and in the Namib Desert. The library started in 1963 with its first in-house publications Scientific Papers of the Namib Desert Research Station by Gobabeb's first director Charles Koch. Since then the library has grown to house the most extensive collection on arid zone research in ecology and biology in sub-Saharan Africa. It is the leading information centre on the Namib Desert and also includes information on other deserts of the world. It houses 1780 books, 18,790 journal offprint publications, and 30 journal holdings. To offer easier access to the library for our users, Gobabeb is in the process of digitising information stored in the library.

== Research ==
The overall goal of research at Gobabeb is to improve the understanding of arid land ecosystems, particularly their variability, with the focus on supporting well-trained specialists and decision-makers in southern Africa and the world. Gobabeb has been the locus of much of the basic research on Namib desert organisms and, more broadly, into the ecology of southern African deserts and arid land. Every year over 100 scientists visit Gobabeb to undertake research and in the past 50 years, over 1,900 publications have been produced at Gobabeb. As a result of such research, the worldwide knowledge about animals and plants coping with the extreme conditions of the desert has vastly improved.

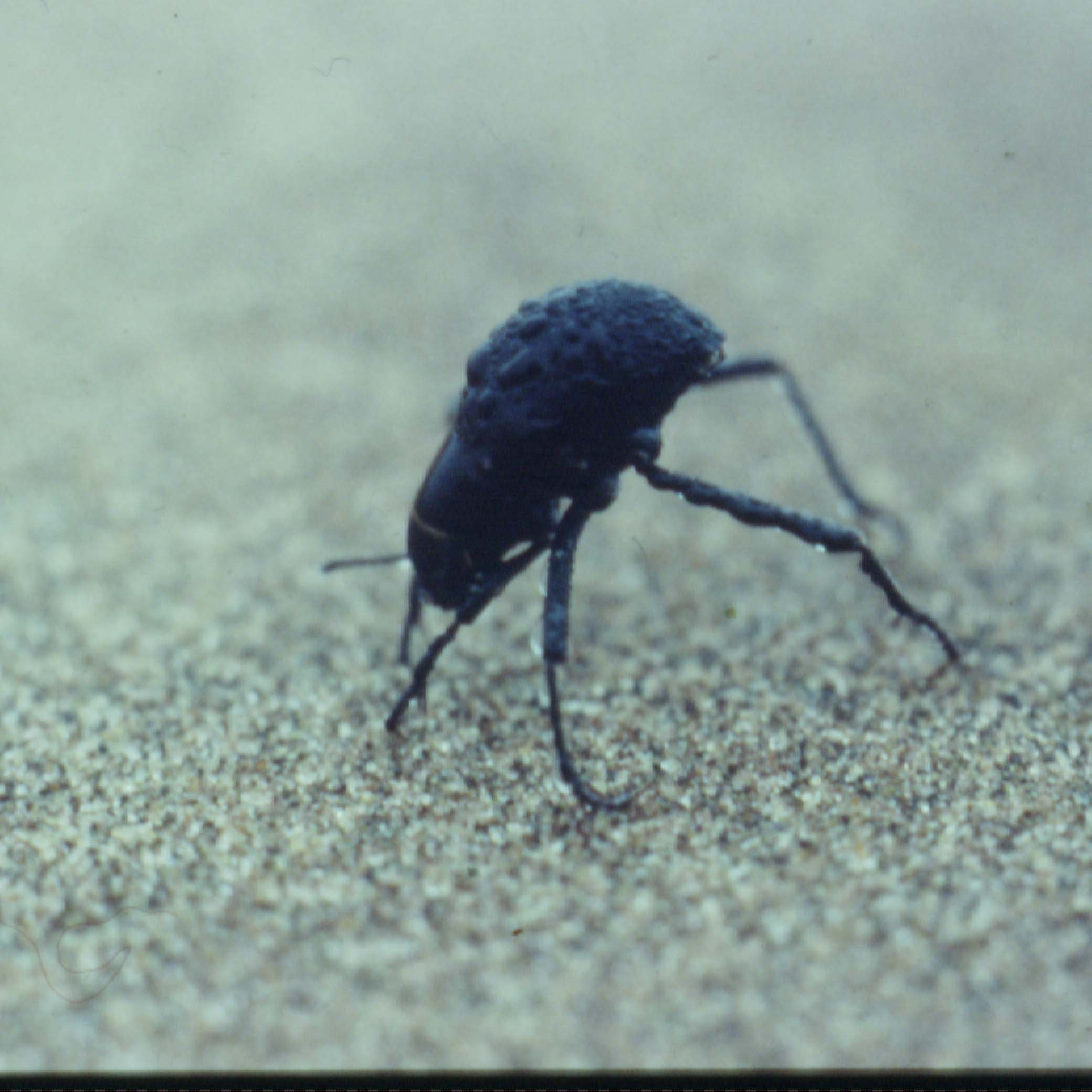
One of Gobabebs greatest discoveries: The beetle Onymacris unguicularis

The fields of research at Gobabeb include:

- Desert organisms and their biodiversity
- Arid land ecosystems and geo-processes
- Preventing desertification
- Climate and climate change
- Restoration ecology of degraded lands
- Appropriate technology
- Alternative livelihoods within the limits of arid environments

The results of this research contribute to many other projects. In particular, long term ecological monitoring of climate and biodiversity, which in some cases has been collected continuously for almost 50 years, represents a valuable contribution to global scientific knowledge. Additionally, research results from Gobabeb support the Kuiseb Basin Management Committee to undertake its integrated land and water management program. In 2010, the Namib Ecological Restoration and Monitoring Unit (NERMU) was established at Gobabeb to address the issue of expanding uranium mining and prospecting within the Namib desert. To date, NERMU has researched or is researching the impact of mining and prospecting on the Hartmann's Mountain Zebra, the Husab Sand Lizard, hypolithic cyanobacteria, and other organisms.

== Training ==
Training is a primary function of the research institute. Over 1,000 learners come to Gobabeb each year and receive training.

Most of the participants are students from primary, secondary and tertiary school. However, farmers, private persons, community representatives and interested groups are also trained. The training is broad-based and concentrates on using participatory methods and hands-on approaches. The programs are provided by Gobabeb staff, visiting trainers and local, regional and international experts. Training is offered in the fields of community based natural resource management, arid land management, desertification, ecology and appropriate technology.

In addition to short training courses, Gobabeb has offered long-term tertiary training to over 180 students at the centre. The Summer Desertification Programme (SDP) ran from 1993 to 2005. Participants were presented with a real-life research problem concerning land degradation, and involving bio-physical and socio-economic factors.

Following the end of funding of SDP, the Gobabeb In-Service Training Programme (GIST) began in 2005 as a partnership between the Polytechnic of Namibia and Gobabeb. GIST research projects included one term of study (approximately 3-month) and covered a wide variety of topics related to the ecology of the Namib Desert. In 2009, the GIST Program transformed into the Gobabeb Training and Research Internship Program (GTRIP), opening the course to all Namibian university students and recent graduates. Since 2010, research in the GTRIP course has focused on restoration ecology in the Namib Desert, contributing to the goals of NERMU.

Gobabeb also hosts national and international interns and volunteers.

== History ==
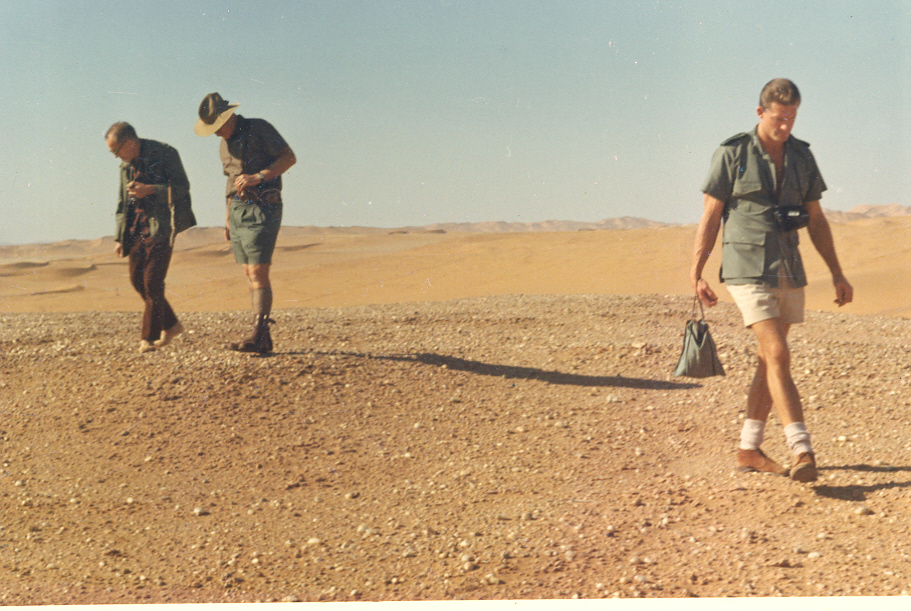
Dr. Charles Koch, Gobabeb's first director (at right), on a field trip in the gravel plains

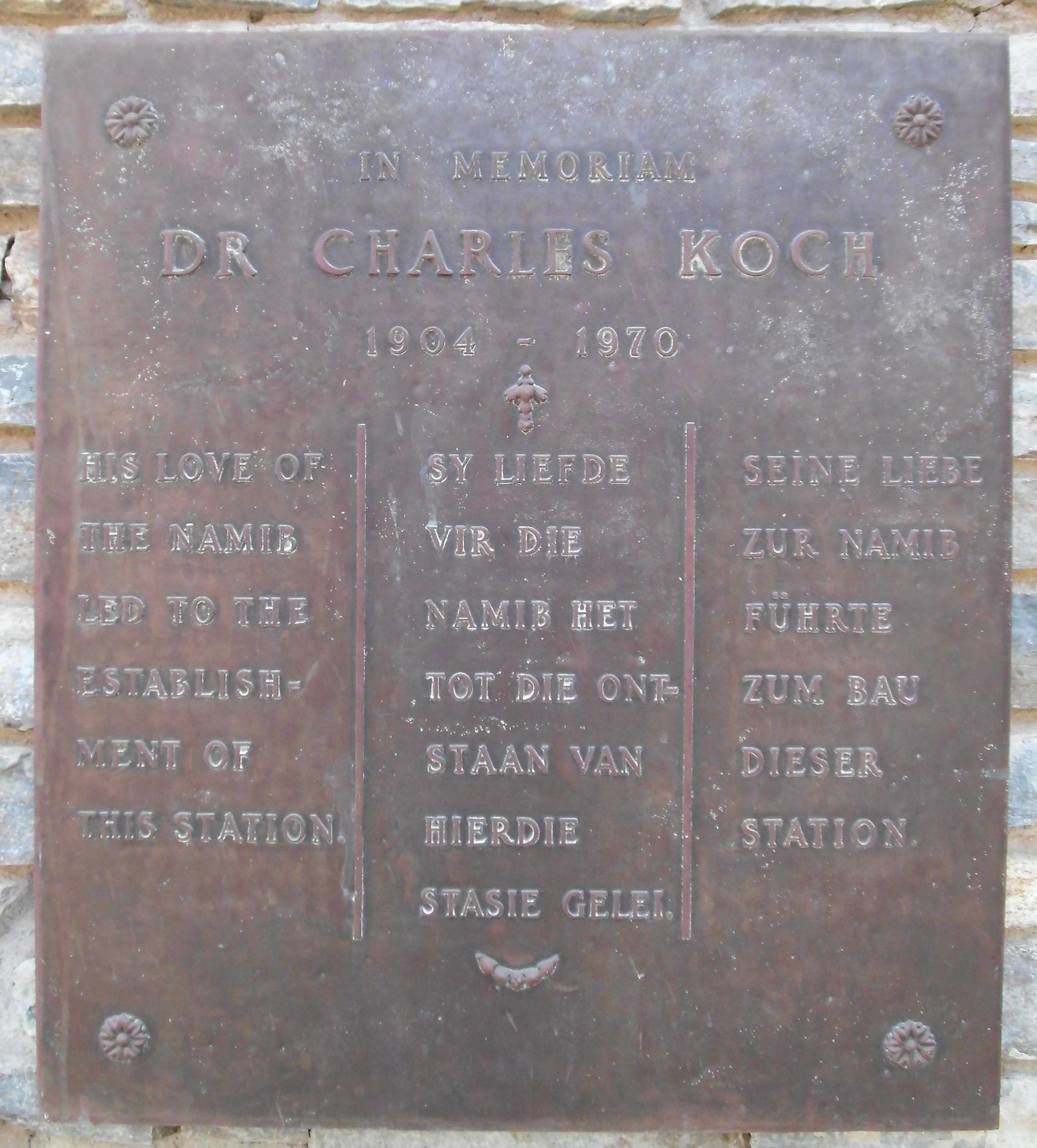
The plaque on the wall pays tribute to Dr. Charles Koch

Gobabeb was formerly a Topnaar community called !Nomabeb, which means place of the figtree. In 1958 the Austrian entomologist Dr. Charles Koch did an expedition in the Namib Desert, focusing on the large diversity of beetles found in the area. One year later the South African Transvaal Museum decided to found a research station in, what was at the time known as, South West Africa (today called Namibia). In 1962 the Namib Desert Research Station (NDSR) was founded, with Dr. Charles Koch appointed as the first director of the station. The government of South Africa, which controlled South West Africa, supported Gobabeb by giving the ground on leasehold for 50 years and financial support of R2,000 per year.

In 1963 the construction of the staff houses, laboratory, office block, garages and a small water tower was completed. In 1965 a partnership between Gobabeb and the Council for Scientific and Industrial Research (CSIR) led to the foundation of the Desert Ecological Research Unit (DERU). The partnership provided R25,000 for the station which was invested in additional buildings.

Five years later, in 1970, the director Dr. Charles Koch died and the biologist Dr. Mary Seely took over the directorship. In 1983, the first Open Weekend was held at Gobabeb, beginning a tradition that continues to this day. In 1989 the first course for Namibian university students in Ecology Methods was held at Gobabeb.

With the Independence of Namibia in 1990 the DERU became the Desert Research Foundation of Namibia (DRFN). The main seat of the DRFN moved to Windhoek, but the research station remained in Gobabeb. In March 1998 Gobabeb Training and Research Center (GTRC) was founded as a joint venture agreement between the DRFN and the Ministry of Environment and Tourism (MET). Additionally, the German Ministerium für wirtschaftliche Zusammenarbeit und Entwicklung (Ministry for Economic Cooperation and Development) has been a great supporter of GTRC.

Since the formation of the joint venture, Gobabeb has operated as a research, training and education centre. Researchers from all over the world study subjects including desertification, water procurement, and the adaption of animals and plants to the desert environment. In 2002, after 32 years directorship at Gobabeb, Dr. Mary Seely passed the position on to Dr. Joh Henschel. The new director arranged the building of several new accommodations for visitors as well as the building of the Community Resource – Center at Gobabeb.

From 2002 to 2004 Gobabeb's energy system was overhauled as a part of the Demonstration Project at Gobabeb of Renewable Energy and Energy Efficiency (DeGREEE). In May 2005 Prime Minister Angula officially inaugurated the Gobabeb Training and Research Center. In March 2011 Joh Henschel resigned his position as director, ushering in a period of transition at Gobabeb lasting from March to August 2011, when the station's affairs were handled by a management committee and an overseer. In January 2013 Gillian Maggs-Kölling was appointed Executive Director of GTRC. In 2017, the name of the station was changed to Gobabeb Namib Research Institute, to reflect Maggs-Kölling's emphasis on restoring research as Gobabeb's primary mission.
