= Nama people =

Ethnic group in Southern Africa

Nama Namaqua
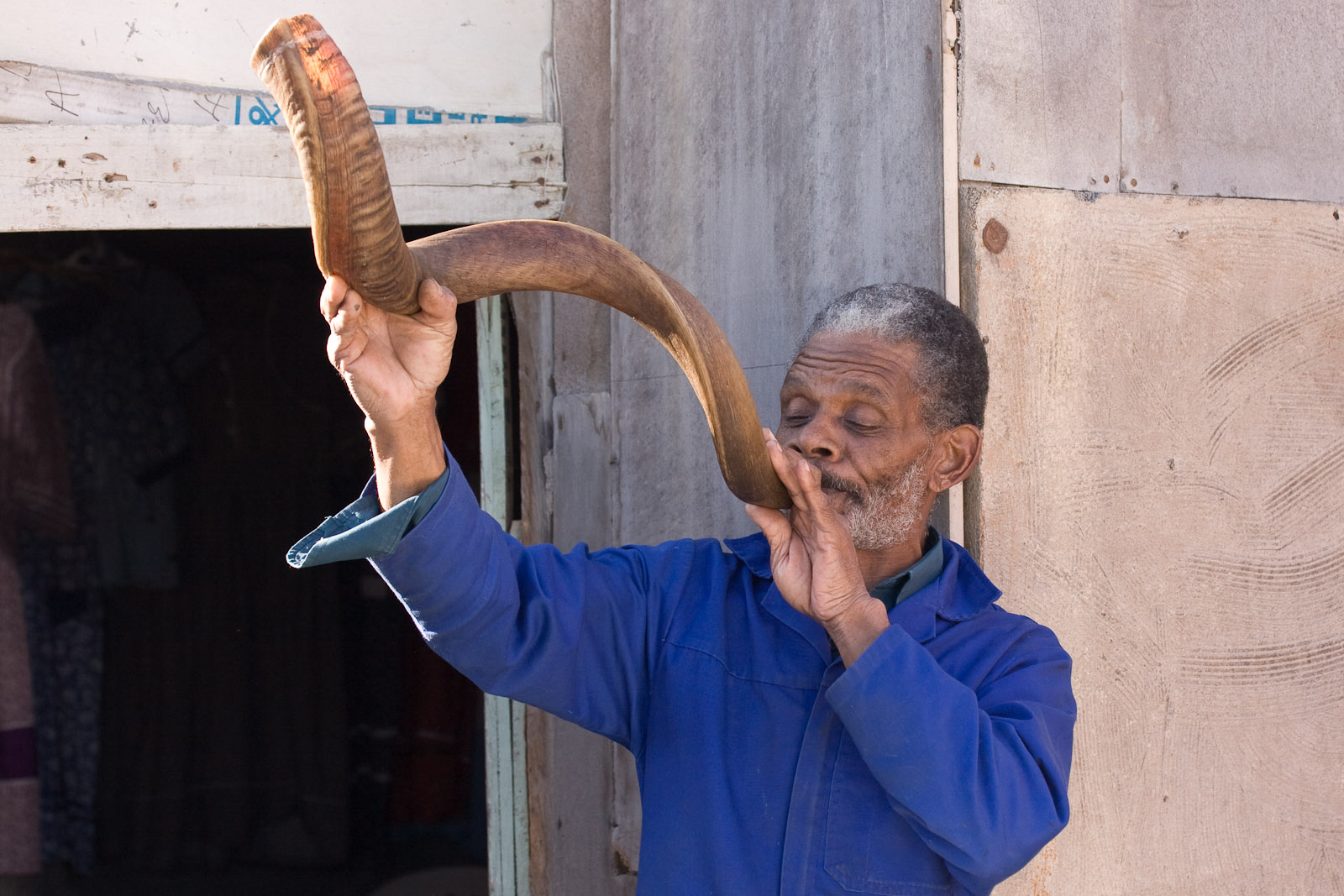
- A Nama man of Namibia

Total population
- 230,000

Regions with significant populations
- Namibia; Botswana; South Africa
- Namibia: 112,156 (2023 census)

Languages
- Nama, Namibian Black German (rare)

Religion
- Christianity, African Traditional Religion, Islam

Related ethnic groups
- Khoekhoe

Nama (in older sources also called Namaqua) are an African ethnic group who reside in South Africa, Namibia, and Botswana. They traditionally speak the Nama language of the Khoe-Kwadi language family, although many Nama also speak Afrikaans. The Nama people (or Nama-Khoe people) were the largest group of the Khoekhoe people, much of which has disappeared as a group. Many of the Nama clans live in central Namibia and other smaller groups live in Namaqualand, which straddles the Namibian border with South Africa.

== History ==
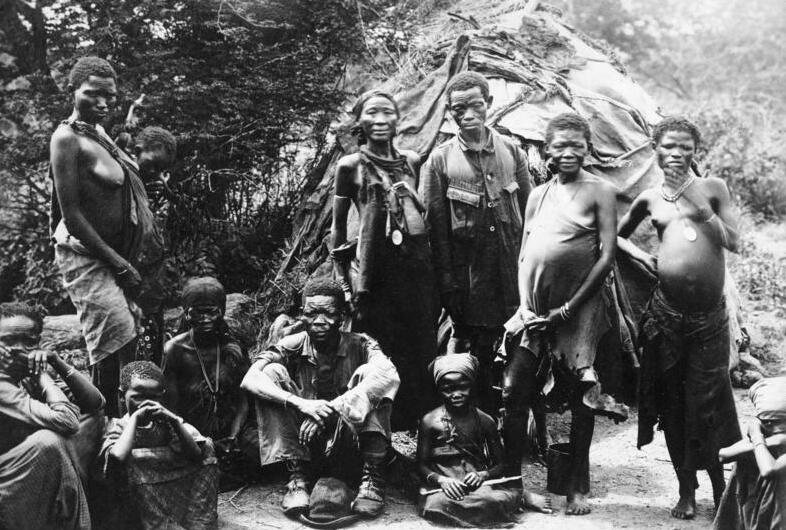
Nama group in front of a hut

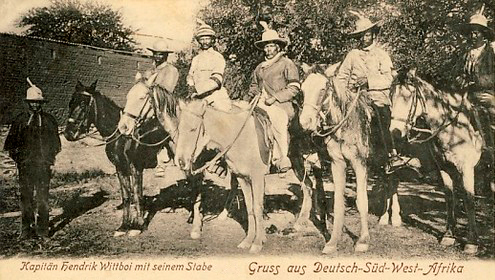
Chief Hendrik Witbooi (centre) and his companions

The Khoisan peoples of South Africa and southern Namibia maintained a nomadic life. The Khoekhoe were farmers and the San people lived as hunter-gatherers. The Nama originally inhabited the banks of the Orange River in southern Namibia and northern South Africa. The early colonialists referred to them as Hottentots. Their alternative historical name, "Namaqua", stems from the addition of the Khoekhoe language suffix "-qua/kwa", meaning "place of" (found in the names of other Southern African nations like the Griqua), to the tribe name.

=== Ancestry from the Khoekhoe People in the Cape Colony ===
In April 1652, Jan van Riebeeck, an official of the Dutch East India Company, arrived at the Cape of Good Hope with 90 people to create a Dutch settlement. There they found the Khoekhoe people, who had settled in the Cape region at least a thousand years earlier. The Khoekhoe at the Cape practiced pastoral farming; they were the first pastoralists in southern Africa. They lived alongside the San people, who were hunter-gatherers. The Khoekhoe had several Nguni cattle and small livestock which they grazed around the Cape. The region was well suited to their lives as pastoralists because it provided enough water for them and their livestock.

Initially, when the Dutch made stops at the Cape of Good Hope, they were on their way to the Indonesian archipelago. While there, the Dutch sought fresh produce and water for themselves. Van Riebeeck initially attempted to obtain cattle, land, and labour from the Khoekhoe people through negotiation. However, when these negotiations failed, conflicts began to occur. The Dutch settlers waged wars against the Khoekhoe, seized their lands to construct farms for wheat and other produce, and forced many Khoekhoe people to work as labourers. Their livestock was also taken and they were denied access to grazing and water resources unless they worked for the Dutch settlers.

During the 18th and 19th centuries, as conflicts intensified and Dutch settlements were growing, taking up more space in the colony, the expansion of the colony frontier pushed the Khoekhoe eastwards into the Eastern Cape and then the "closed frontier" reserves, Transkei and Ciskei; and some including the Nama fled northwards, across the so-called "open frontier" into the Northern Cape and crossed the Orange River into German South West Africa, renamed Namibia in 1968.

In 1991, a part of Namaqualand (home of the Nama and one of the last true wilderness areas of South Africa) was named the Richtersveld National Park. In December 2002, ancestral lands, including the park, were returned to community ownership and the governments of South Africa and Namibia began creating a transfrontier park from the west coast of southern Africa to the desert interior, absorbing the Richtersveld National Park. Today, the Richtersveld National Park is one of the few places where the original Nama traditions survive. There, the Nama move with the seasons and speak their own language. The traditional Nama dwelling – the |haru oms, or portable rush-mat covered domed hut – protects against the blistering sun, and is easy to move when grazing becomes scarce.

=== Nama People in German South West Africa ===
Some Khoekhoe groups including the Nama under the leadership of David Witbooi (Hendrik Witbooi's grandfather) had crossed the Orange River into German South West Africa. Jager Afrikaner was the Nama indigenous leader from Little Namaqualand to establish a permanent Nama settlement north of the !Garib in 1795 (after the murder of Petrus Pienaar, a Dutch burger) beginning in the late 18th cemtury. In 1823-24, his son |Haramûb |Hoa|arab (Jonker Afrikaner) eventually led a part of the |Hoa|ara ||aixa ||aes (Oorlam Afrikaner Nama community) to the area of |Ae||gams (modern day Windhoek) where they developed a communal society centered on cattle, trade and Christianity and Tsui-||goab and Heitsi-Eibib worship. After his death in 1861. His oldest son Christian Afrikaner assued Chieftancy but fell in battle during the war against Charles Andersson during the early 1860s. The famous and legendary Jan Jonker Afrikaner took over the gaosib (Chieftainship) until his death in battle against the |Khowese gaob (Chief) !Nanseb |Gâbemab (Hendrik Witbooi). Moses Witbooi (Hendrik Witbooi's father) assumed chieftaincy and remained in that position until 1883. Like his father, Hendrik followed Christian practices and worked closely with Johannes Olpp, a Protestant missionary affiliated with Rheinische Missionsgesellschaft (Rhenish Mission Society, RMG) who arrived in Gibeon in 1868. Moses, the predecessor of Hendrik Witbooi (his father) supported Olpp's efforts to build a church and mission station, and helped found an RMG school in the settlement.

==== Conflicts between Nama people and Herero people ====
In June 1884 Hendrik Witbooi had taken over leadership from his father, and in that year he began the first of his several treks with his people, north into central Damaraland in search of new settlement. He had resigned from his position as a church elder a year before. He styled himself as a biblical prophet and gained the support of the most prominent families in Gibeon. Witbooi established a settlement in Hoornkrans, an important stronghold territory controlled by the Herero, led by Chief Maharero. Witbooi's decision to expand his influence into Hoornkrans sparked a protracted military conflict between the two tribes. However, a few months before the conflict began, Maharero had finalized a protection agreement with officials from the newly arrived German colonial administration. Although he knew about Maharero's treaty with Germany, Witbooi never waivered in his decision to confront the Herero people. Witbooi was campaigning for his tribe's supremacy in the colony and he continued to clash with other tribal communities that were under German protection. These rivalries between the Nama people and other tribes posed a significant problem for the imperial government because the Germans' mandate for the colony was gradually being weakened. German leaders therefore sought an end to the conflicts between the Herero and Witbooi Namaqua.

==== Nama–German conflicts ====
In June 1886, Reichskomissar Heinrich Göring wrote Witbooi, encouraging him to end his hostile actions in the colony. He pleaded with the Nama Chief to return home to Gibeon to be with his father and tribe and live in peace there; he warned that the German government could not allow chieftains who have placed themselves under German protection to support his ambition of driving a protected chiefdom into war. Witbooi and his people ignored this warning and continued his campaign for dominance against the Herero. Later that year Louis Nels, a deputy officer to Göering wrote to Witbooi inviting him to participate in a conciliatory meeting between the various warring communities in Walvis Bay. With this meeting German authorities had hoped to facilitate a peace treaty, however the Nama chief did not comply with the request. Instead he wrote a letter in response telling Nels that he would not listen to him. He made it known to Nels that he (Witbooi) was a chief of his tribe, a free and autonomous man who answers only to God. The German officials did not respond to Witbooi's diplomatic reproach. With the limits of Germany on full display, imperial officials were at a loss about how to end the violence in GSWA.

In June 1888, Heinrich Göring wrote to Chancellor Otto Von Bismarck and described the overall situation as "not very encouraging". In April 1889 Göring went so far as to threaten open war against Witbooi and his tribe if he did not halt his attacks against groups allied with Germany. Witbooi's resistance prompted policy makers to seek immediate solutions to the instability in GSWA. The Nama resistance provoked the German authorities to act decisively, and from 1889 Germany's military presence in the colony began to grow significantly. In March 1893 Chancellor Von Caprivi proclaimed GSWA a German settlement colony. In November that year Kaiser Wilhelm II appointed Curt von François as Landeshauptmann. A fanatic, François looked at Witbooi with disdain and called him a mere "tribesman" whom he could defeat easily. He had a notion that his predecessors acted weakly in dealing with the Nama chief and that they made too many concessions. François strongly believed that nothing but relentless severity would end Witbooi's resistance decisively. Initially the German official tried to entice Witbooi with an annual payment of five thousand marks if he would submit, however the Nama chief maintained his stand.

François was pressured by the Colonial Society to take action against Witbooi. On April 12, 1893, he launched a surprise attack on Witbooi and his tribe at Hoornkrans. 214 soldiers had been sent with an ultimate objective to "destroy the Witbooi Nama tribe". Though Witbooi and majority of his male soldiers escaped the encirclement, German troops killed nearly one hundred Nama women and children in their sleep. The Nama were unprepared for the raid, believing François was still committed to neutrality. Previously Hendrik had scrupulously avoided harming Germans, but now was compelled to join the colonizers in war. In a series of running skirmishes that lasted for more than a year the Nama had great success, stealing horses and livestock from the German headquarters in Windhoek. At the end of 1893 Theodor Leutwein replaced Von François. He was appointed to the colony to investigate the reasons for the continuing failure to subdue the Nama people. In July 1894 Leutwein asked for 250 troops and with the enlarged army he was able to defeat the Nama people who had run out of ammunition; the English at the Cape and Walvis Bay had refused them assistance. Leiutwein successfully thus subdued the Nama and forced Hendrik to sign a protection treaty.

==== Nama–Herero genocide (1904–1908) ====
In June 1904 Kaiser Wilhelm replaced Leutwein with Lieutenant General Lothar von Trotha; like his predecessor, von Trotha believed that violence would ultimately put an end to the wars in the colony. He employed a policy of extermination of all African tribes in the colony.

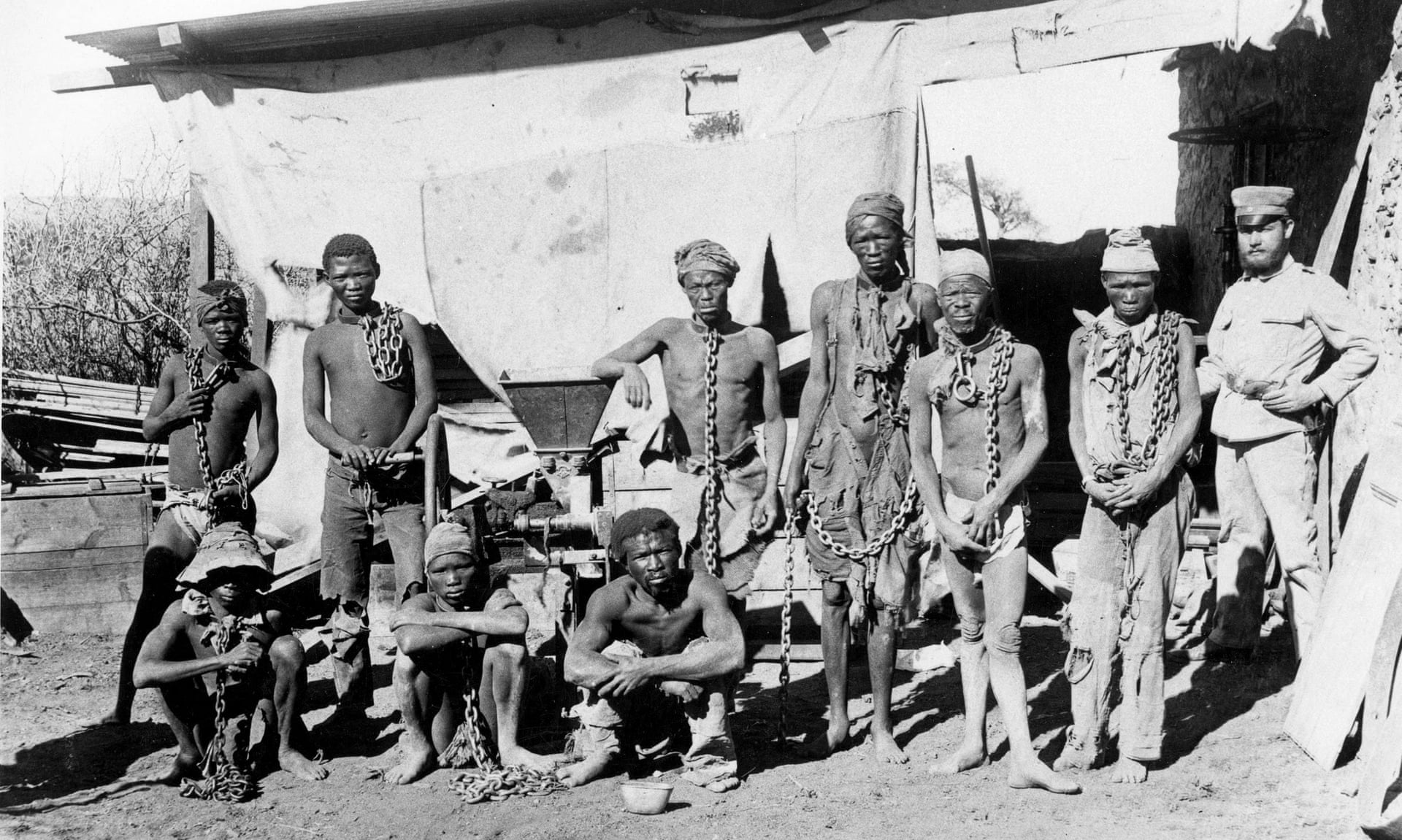
Prisoners during the Herero and Nama genocide

The Nama people were fighters in pre-colonial times, the Namas and the Herero people having fought for control of pastures in central Namibia. This battle continued for much of the 19th century.

From 1904 to 1908, the German Empire, which had colonized present-day Namibia, waged a war against the Nama and the Herero, leading to the Herero and Nama genocide and a large loss of life for both the Nama and Herero populations. This was motivated by the German desire to establish a prosperous colony which required displacing the indigenous people from their agricultural land. Large herds of cattle were confiscated and Nama and Herero people were driven into the desert and in some cases interned in concentration camps on the coast, for example at Shark Island. Additionally, the Nama and Herero were forced into slave labor to build railways and to dig for diamonds during the diamond rush.

In the 1920s diamonds were discovered at the mouth of the Orange River, and prospectors began moving there, establishing towns at Alexander Bay and Port Nolloth. This accelerated the appropriation of traditional lands that had begun early in the colonial period. Under apartheid, remaining tribespeople were encouraged to abandon their traditional lifestyle in favour of village life.

At the beginning of the 19th century, the Oorlam people encroached into Namaqualand and Damaraland. They descended from the indigenous Khoekhoe but were a group with mixed ancestry including Europeans and slaves from Madagascar, India, and Indonesia. After two centuries of assimilation into the Nama culture, many Oorlams today regard Khoekhoegowab (Damara/Nama) as their mother tongue, though others speak Afrikaans. The distinction between Namas and Oorlams has gradually disappeared over time to the extent that they are today regarded as one ethnic group, despite their different ancestries.

== Subtribes ==
- ǀKhowesen (Direct descendants of Captain Hendrik Witbooi) who was killed in the battle with Germans on 29 October 1905. The |Khowesin, reside in modern-day Gibeon under the leadership of Ismael Hendrik Witbooi the 9th Gaob (meaning captain) of the |Khowesen Gibeon, situated 72 km south of Mariental and 176 km north of Keetmanshoop just off the B1, was originally known by the name Khaxa-tsûs. It received its name from Kido Witbooi first Kaptein of the ǀKhowesin.
- Khaiǁkhaun (Red Nation) at Hoachanas, the main group and the oldest Nama clan in Namibia
- ǃGamiǂnun (Bondelswarts) at Warmbad
- ǂAonin (Topnaars) at Utuseb and Rooibank
- ǃKharakhoen (Fransman Nama) at Gochas. After being defeated by Imperial Germany's Schutztruppe in the Battle of Swartfontein on 15 January 1905, this Nama group split into two. Part of the ǃKharakhoen fled to Lokgwabe, Botswana, and stayed there permanently, the part that remained on South West African soil relocated their tribal centre to Amper-Bo. In 2016 David Hanse was inaugurated as chief of the clan.
- ǁHawoben (Veldschoendragers) at Koës
- !Aman at Bethanie which was led by Cornelius Frederick
- ǁOgain (Groot Doden) at Schlip
- ǁKhauǀgoan (Swartbooi Nama) at Rehoboth, later at Salem, Ameib, and Fransfontein, derived from the nickname Swaartbooi (Afrikaans: black boy) of their first leader Kanabeb. Swartbooisdrift on the Kunene River, where they crossed into Angola, is named after the clan. Their current traditional leadership authority, the Swartbooi Traditional Authority, is located in Fransfontein, named after Frans Fredrick who was sent by Cornelius Swartbooi to explore and find a place to live. The current gaob of the Swartbooi Nama is Charles Otto William ǀUirab.
- The Kharoǃoan (Keetmanshoop Nama) under the leadership of Hendrik Tseib split from the Red Nation in February 1850 and settled at Keetmanshoop.

== Culture ==
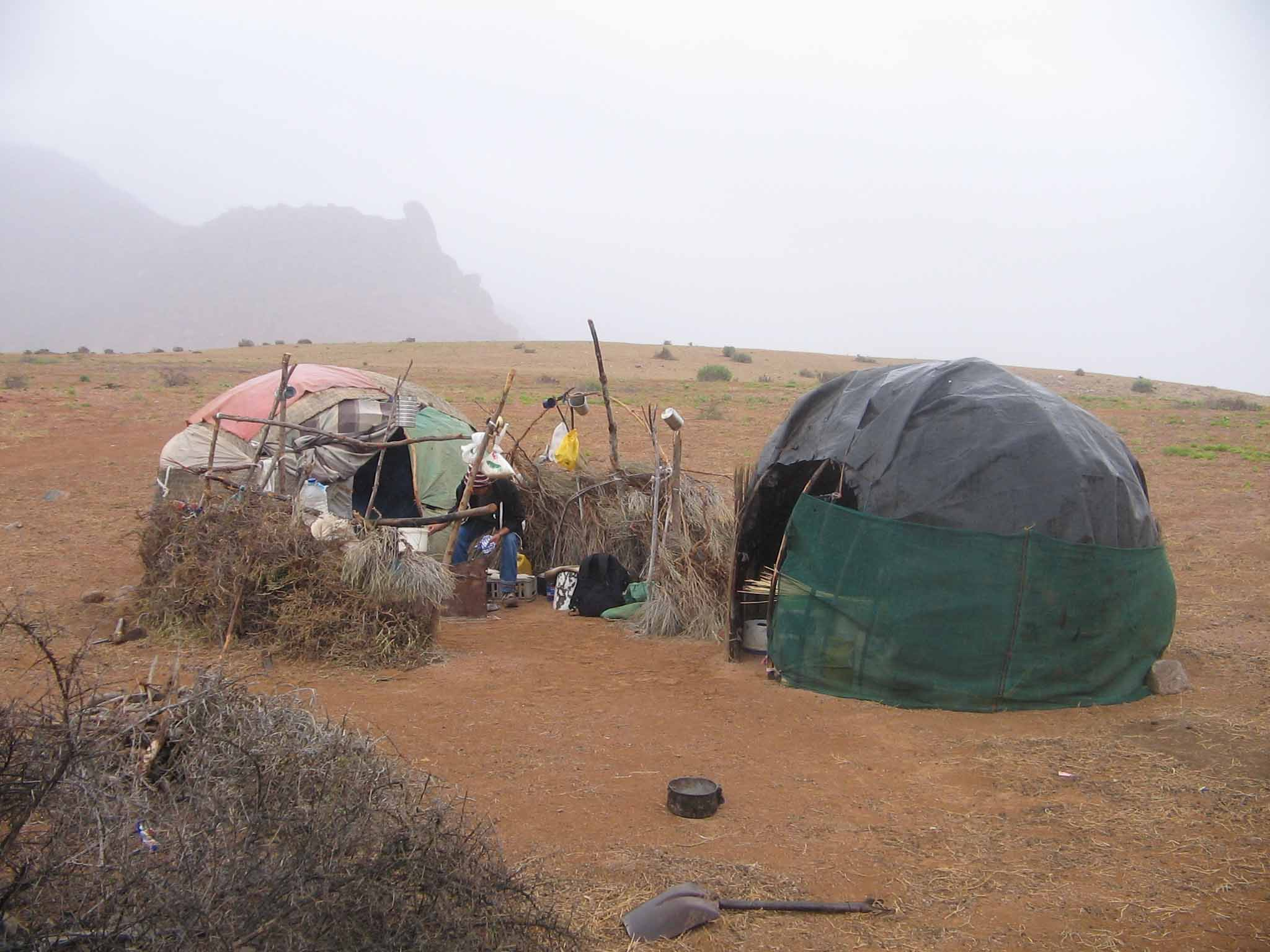
Haru oms huts.

In general, the Nama practice a policy of communal land ownership. Music, poetry and story telling are very important in Nama culture and many stories have been passed down orally through the generations. They are known for crafts which include leatherwork, skin karosses and mats, musical instruments (such as reed flutes), jewellery, clay pots, and tortoiseshell powder containers.

Many of the Nama people in South Namibia lost their lands during German colonialism. In 2016 the Namibian minister of land reform, Uutoni Nujoma, was accused of preferring Namibians from other regions over native Namas.

=== Dress ===
The traditional dress of Nama women consists of formal dresses that resemble Victorian traditional fashion. The long, flowing dresses were developed from the style of the missionaries in the 1800s, and this traditional clothing is today an integral part of the Nama culture.

=== Habitation ===
The Nama people's hut, also called matjieshuis (or haru oms in the Nama language), is a round hut traditionally made of reed mats, on a skeleton of sticks, woven into a beehive shape by women. It echoes their nomadic history; matjieshuis is still part of the life of the inhabitants of Richtersveld – a region of mountainous deserts in the northwest of South Africa and the last place where the Nama are still found in significant numbers. The matjieshuis is used as a store, as a kitchen, as an additional place to sleep, or even to provide accommodation to tourists. It is a dwelling house for all seasons – cool and well ventilated in summer, naturally insulated by reed carpets in winter, and protected from the rain by the porous stems which swell with water. All materials are organic and not over-harvested; this is a home that truly respects the environment. These Huts are very mobile, but also stable, being able to break them down in less than an hour. The huts are also reusable. Women and men take part in the collection of materials, preparation of rugs and in the construction of the hut, in a very meticulous process which has remained a true Nama art.

=== Settlements ===
Traditionally, Nama camps had 5-30 huts - circular domes whose doors faced the center of camp. They were also arranged hierarchically; the chief's was positioned to the west and faced east. Other families were placed based on their seniority. Elder brothers and their families were on the far right, while younger brothers and their families on the left. Adult livestock sleep in front of their owners' huts; calves and lambs are placed in an enclosed area in the middle of camp.

=== Religion ===
The Namas have largely abandoned their traditional religion as a result of the sustained efforts of Christian and Muslim missionaries. The majority of the Nama people in Namibia today are therefore Christian, while Nama Muslims make up a large percentage of Namibia's Muslims.

=== Burials ===
In the past funerals were not a big social gathering. The Nama people simply buried the body and never spoke about the person again due to fear of spirits. Today funerals are social solidarity. The position of the person in the community being buried determines the burial site. Close relatives of the deceased person spend a week preparing the grave site, digging and using flattened oil drums as sheets. Mourning takes place three days before the burial. During the first two nights of the mourning, there is singing of hymns, preaching and praying. On the last day of the mourning and the day of the burial, speeches are made and messages of condolence presented. The grave is lined with brick, and once the body is inside, a wooden board is laid upon the top before it is covered with dirt.

=== Wedding ritual ===
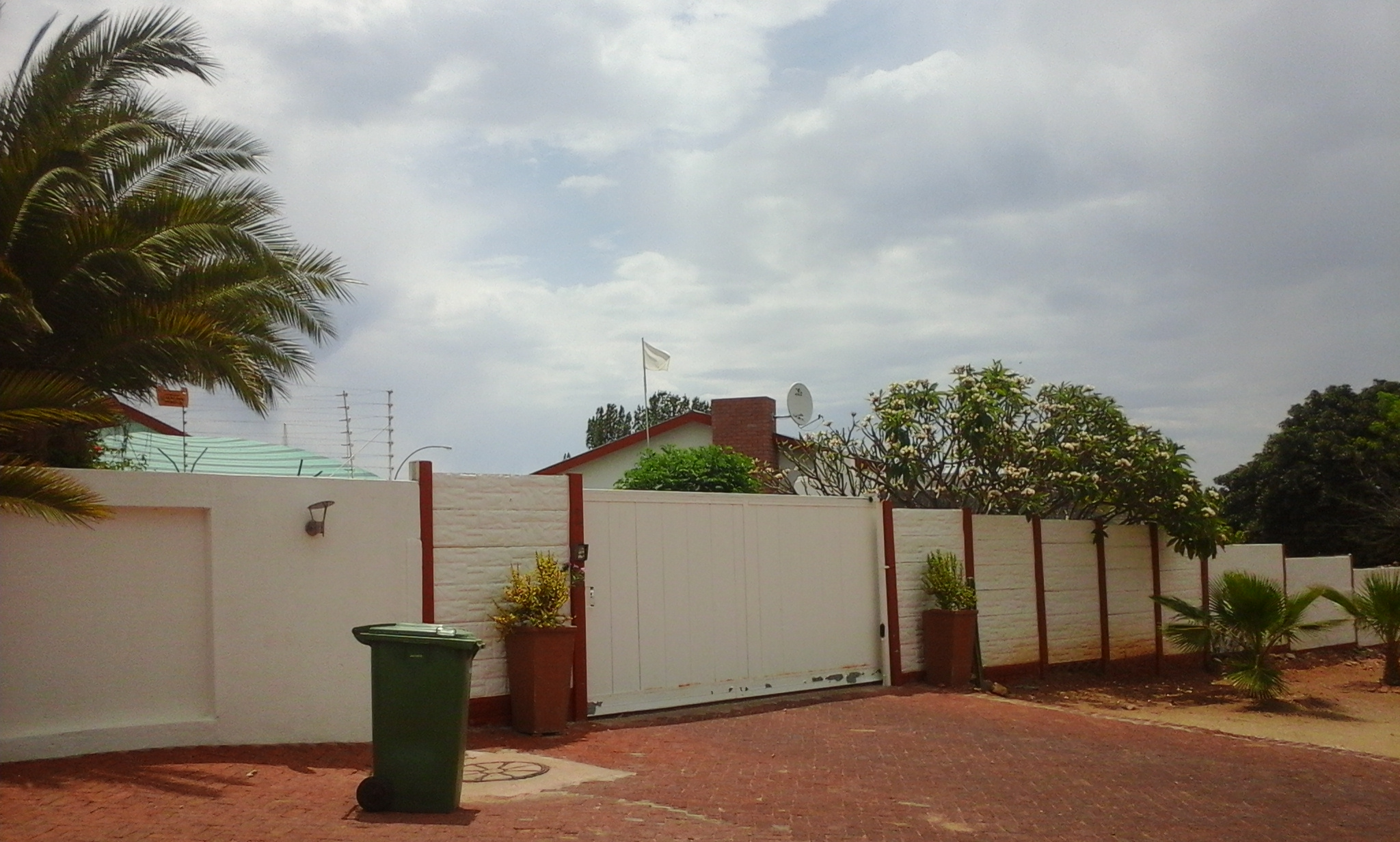
A house in Windhoek's Hochland Park suburb. The white flag indicates marriage arrangements are in place.

Namas have a complicated wedding ritual. First, the man has to discuss his intentions with his family. If they agree they will advise him of the custom to ask the bride's family and then accompany him to the place she lives. The yard at the bride's home is prepared prior to the future husband's family's arrival; animal hides are laid out in the corners for the different groups to sit down and discuss.

The groom's family will ask for the gate to be opened. If this is granted, the groom is interrogated about details of the bride, including the circumstances of their first meeting and how to identify her body marks to make sure both know each other well. If the bride is pregnant or already has children from her future husband or someone else, the bride is subjected to the "door cleansing" ceremony (slaughtering and consuming a snow-white goat). After several days the wedding ritual continues in reverse; the bride's family visits the clan of the groom. If all is to the satisfaction of the two clans, an engagement day is announced.

At the engagement, the groom's family brings live animals to the woman's family home. The animals are slaughtered, hung on three sticks, and each part is offered to the bride's family. Other items like bags of sugar or flour are only offered in quantities of two or four to indicate that there will always be abundance of food. This process is also celebrated in reverse at the groom's family home. White flags are mounted on both families' houses; these may not be taken down, but wither or are blown off by the wind.

The wedding preparations can take up to a year. The family of the groom makes a gift to the bride's mother, traditionally a cow and a calf, for she has raised the bride at her breast. A bargaining process, that can take weeks, accompanies the gift. On the wedding day, both families provide animals and other food and bring it to the bride's home. The wedding takes place in a church. Festivities afterward go on for several days. The couple spends the first night after the wedding separately. The next morning, they set off for their own home.

== See also ==
- Democratic Action for Namas

== Literature ==
- Hoernlé, A. Winifred (1925). "The Social Organization of the Nama Hottentots of Southwest Africa". American Anthropologist. 27 (1): 1–24. doi:10.1525/aa.1925.27.1.02a00020. JSTOR 661495.
- Lowie, Robert H. (1919). "Reviewed work: Harvard African Studies II; Varia Africana II, Oric Bates". American Anthropologist. 21 (2): 208–210. doi:10.1525/aa.1919.21.2.02a00160. JSTOR 660280.
- Schultze, Leonhard (1907) Aus Namaland und Kalahari, Gustav Fischer Verlag, Jena OCLC 470637064 (in German)
- Leonhard Schultze et al. (1970) In Namaland and the Kalahari, Human Relations Area Files, New Haven, Conn. OCLC 37146594
