= Charles Koch (entomologist) =

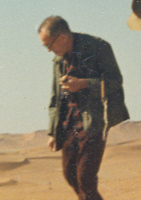

Charles Koch also known as Karl Koch, Carlo Koch or Charley Koch (5 January 1904 – 23 February 1970) was an Austrian jurist and amateur entomologist. He became interested in the desert fauna and specialized in the Staphylinidae and the Tenebrionidae. He established a desert research station in Gobabeb, Namibia. Although not trained in biology, he took an interest in ecological and biogeographical ideas on insect distribution.

Koch was born in Vienna and studied and went to study in Vienna, Paris, Pavia and Monaco. He was invited by Duke Alessandro delle Torre e Tasso to his private collection "Pietro Rossi" in Duino, Italy in 1929. Here he studied the collections of beetles and went to the International Entomological Congress in Paris in 1932. After the death of the Duke in 1937 he worked at Museum "Georg Frey" in Tutzing near Munich. Here he specialized on the tenebrionid collections of Hans Gebien and Adrian Schuster. During World War II he was posted to the Island of Crete and in 1948 he published a monograph on the Tenebrionidae of Crete. In 1949 he went on an expedition to South Africa as part of a team from the University of California and the Transvaal Museum. In 1953 he became the head of the entomology section of the Transvaal Museum in Pretoria. He received a doctorate from Munich University in 1960. In 1962-63 he established a desert research station in Namibia in Gobabeb. It is located next to a seasonal Kuiseb stream which separates the dunes to the north and the gravel plains to the south. Koch worked also on the Staphylinidae, describing 16 species and 13 genera.

Koch was a member of the Royal Entomological Society, the Royal Geographical Society and the Royal South African Society. He died in Windhoek. Many species have been named after him including the beetle Scarabeus kochi. The reptiles Colopus kochii and Ptenopus kochi are named after him.
