= Kuiseb River =

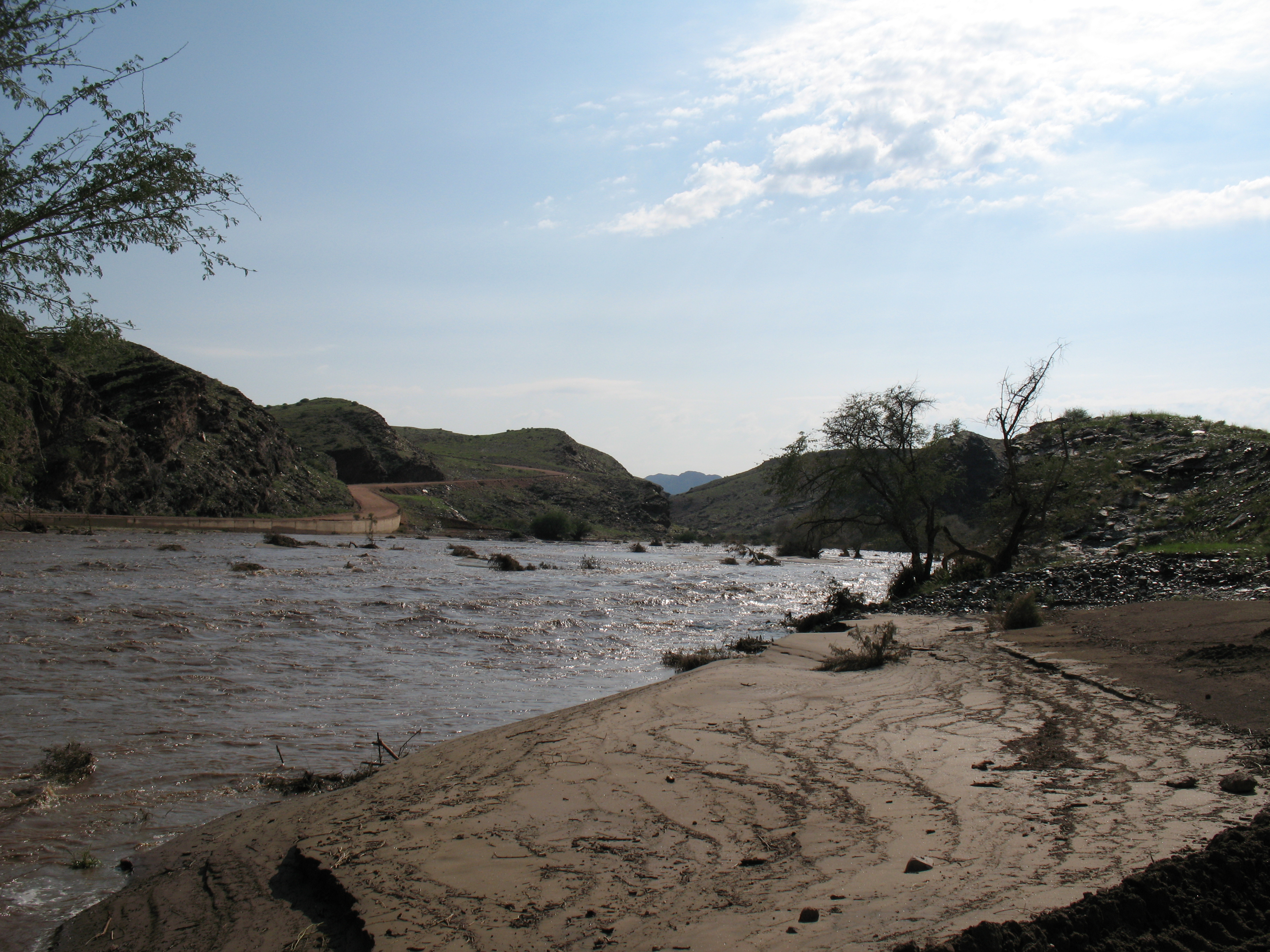
- The Kuiseb River during rain season

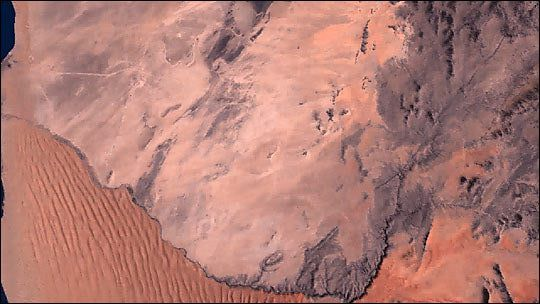
- Satellite image of the Kuiseb River

Location
- Country: Namibia
- Regions: Khomas, Erongo

Physical characteristics
- Source: west of Windhoek
  - location: Khomas Highland
- Mouth: Atlantic Ocean
  - location: Walvis Bay
  - coordinates: 23°07′S 14°32′E
  - elevation: 0 m (0 ft)
- Length: c. 480 km (300 mi)
- Basin size: 15,500 km^{2} (6,000 sq mi)
- Discharge
  - average: c. 20 million cubic metres per annum (710×10^{6} cu ft/a)

Basin features
- Tributaries
  - left: Gomab River, Ojab River, Chausib River, Gaub River
  - right: Koam River, Nausgomab River, Goagos River
- Waterbodies: Friedenau Dam

The Kuiseb River is an ephemeral river in western-central Namibia. Its source is in the Khomas Highland west of Windhoek. From there it flows westwards through the Namib-Naukluft National Park and the Namib desert to Walvis Bay. Several settlements of the Topnaar people are on the banks of the lower Kuiseb, for instance Homeb, Sandfontein, Rooibank, and Utuseb. Inflows of the Kuiseb are Gomab, Ojab, Chausib, Gaub, Koam, Nausgomab and Goagos.

The Kuiseb's catchment area (including its tributaries) is estimated to be between 15,500 km^{2} (6,000 sq mi) and 16,692 km^{2} (6,445 sq mi). It has a mean run-off of roughly 20 million cubic metres per annum (710×10^{6} cu ft/a). Friedenau Dam, built in 1972, is on the river. In January 2005, for the first time in years, the Kuiseb flowed to the ocean.

Between Naukluft and Namib the Kuiseb carved out a canyon in a barren and inaccessible area. During World War II the area around the Kuiseb Canyon served as a shelter for Henno Martin and Hermann Korn who moved there to wait the war out. Two books and a film were subsequently published about this 2-year stay; the ruins of their shelter can be visited. On its course through the Namib the Kuiseb is bordered on one side by some of the tallest sand dunes in the world, and on the other by barren rock. The red sand dunes south of the river reach heights over 150 meters. The prevailing winds blow the dunes northward, but their movement is blocked by the river. In the process, so much sand and silt is deposited in the Kuiseb that it only reaches the sea when it floods.

In 1907, the area between the Swakop River and the Kuiseb was designated by the German colonial administration as a game reserve. The area is currently part of the Namib-Naukluft National Park. The Desert Research Foundation of Namibia (DRFN) is located at Gobabeb on the banks of the river.

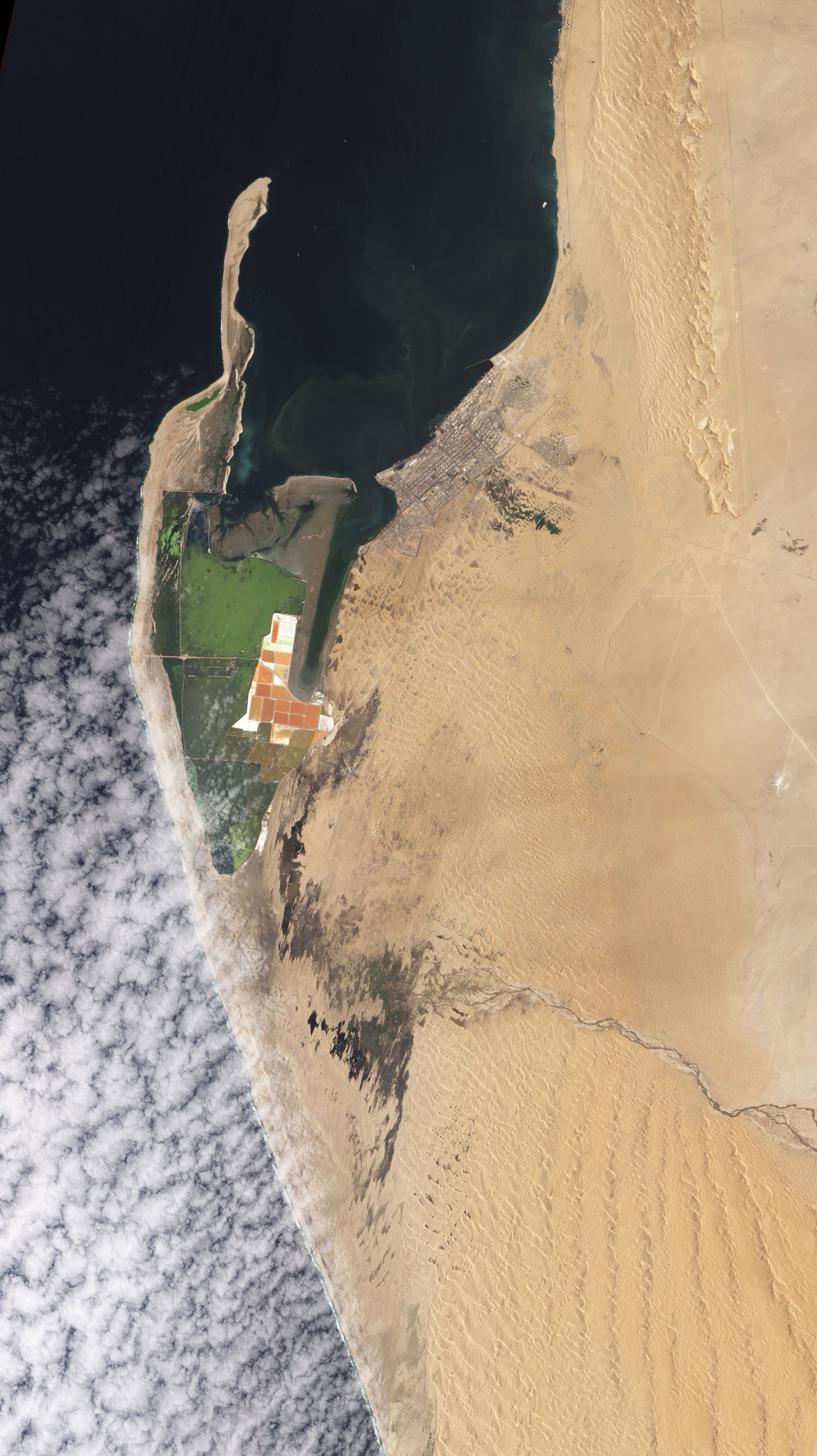
Natural-colour satellite image of the Kuiseb River.

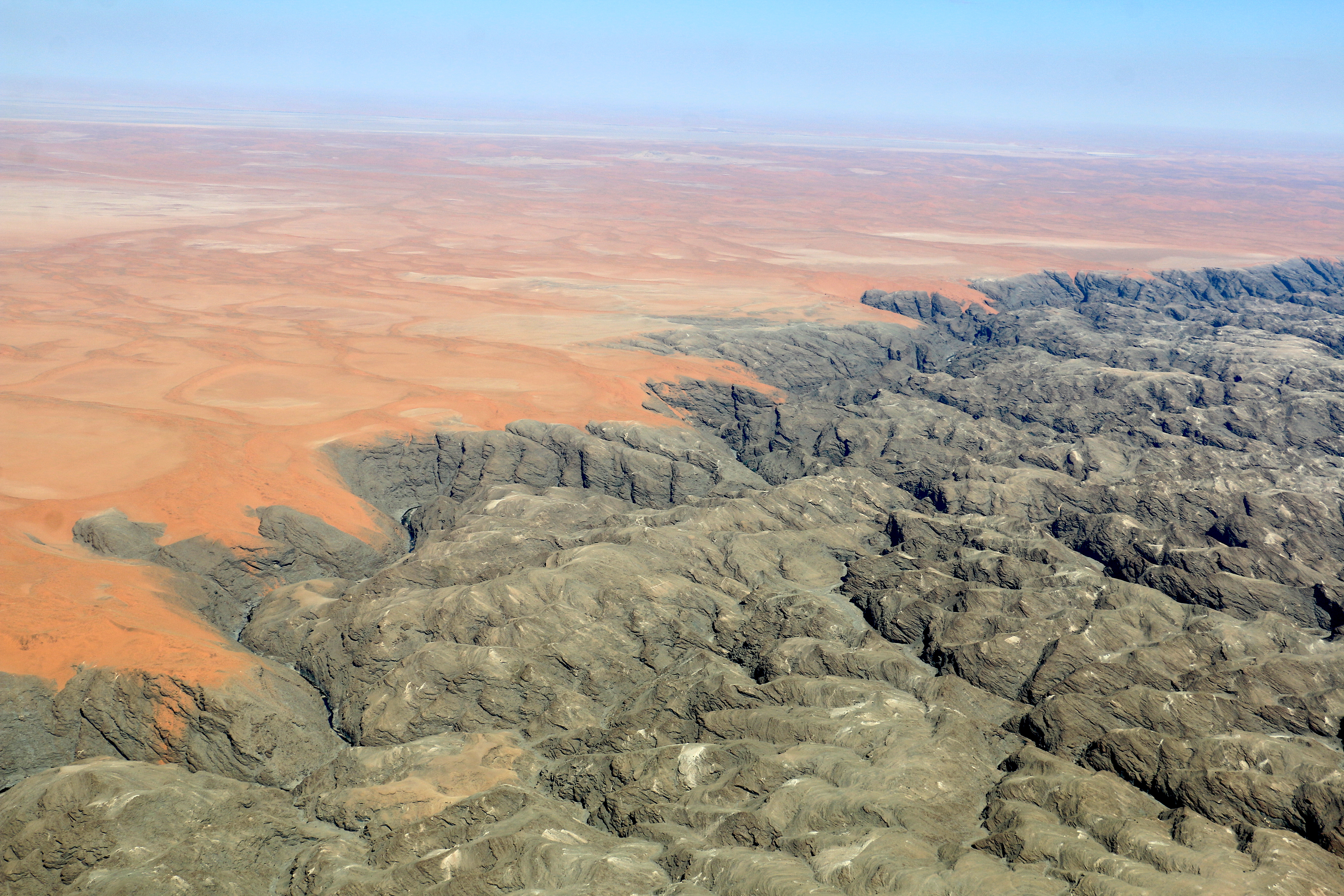
Aerial view of Kuiseb River (2017)

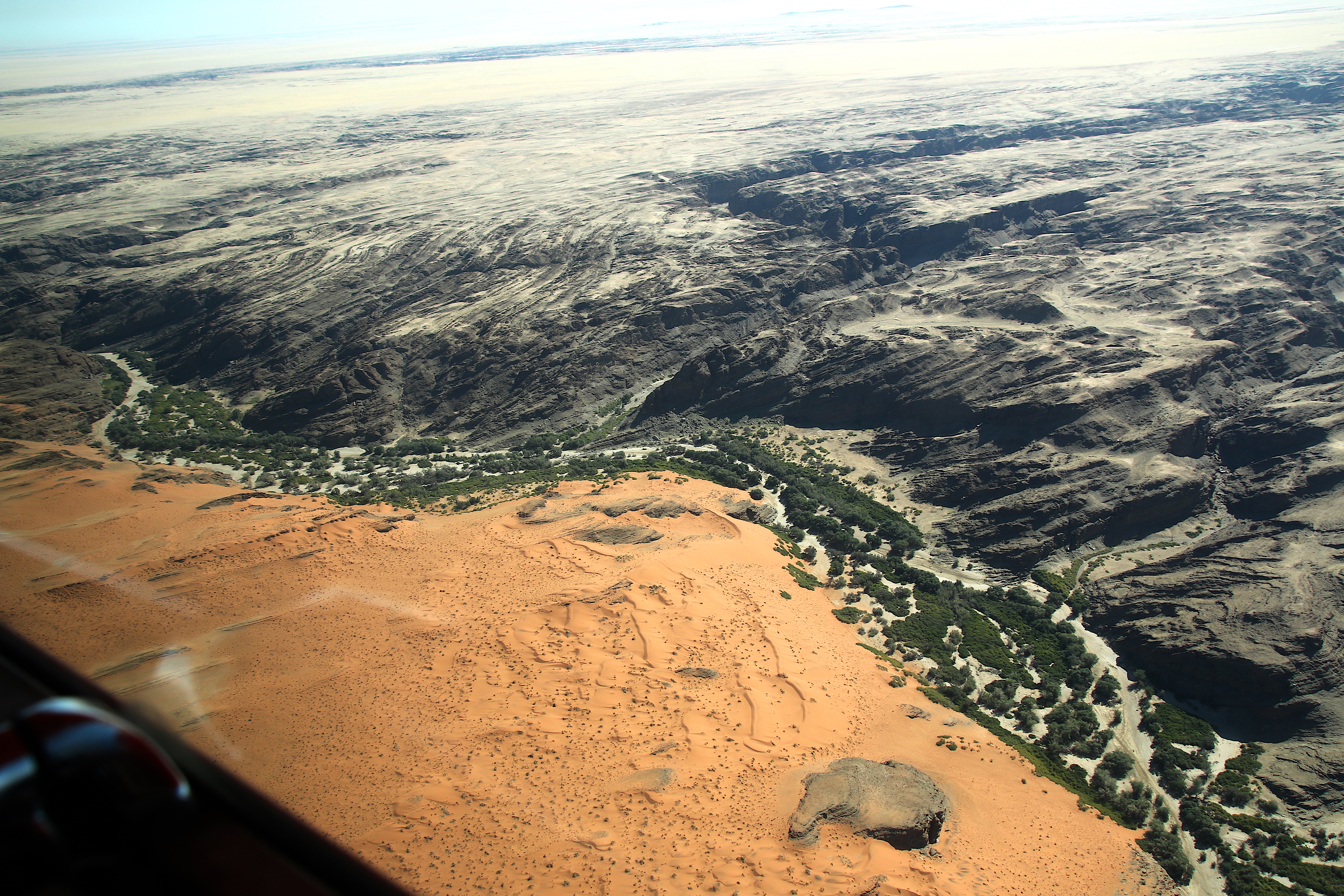
Kuiseb River (2018)

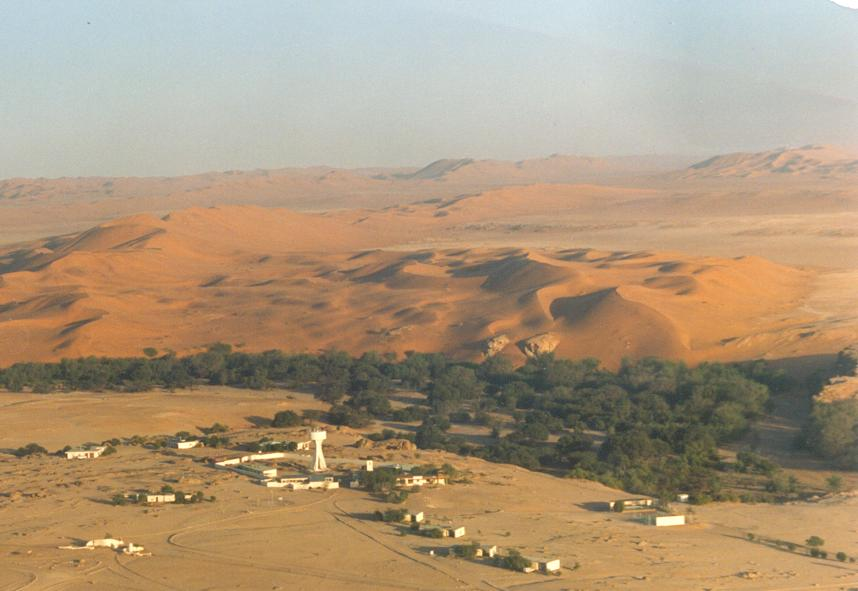
Aerial view of the Gobabeb Training and Research Centre

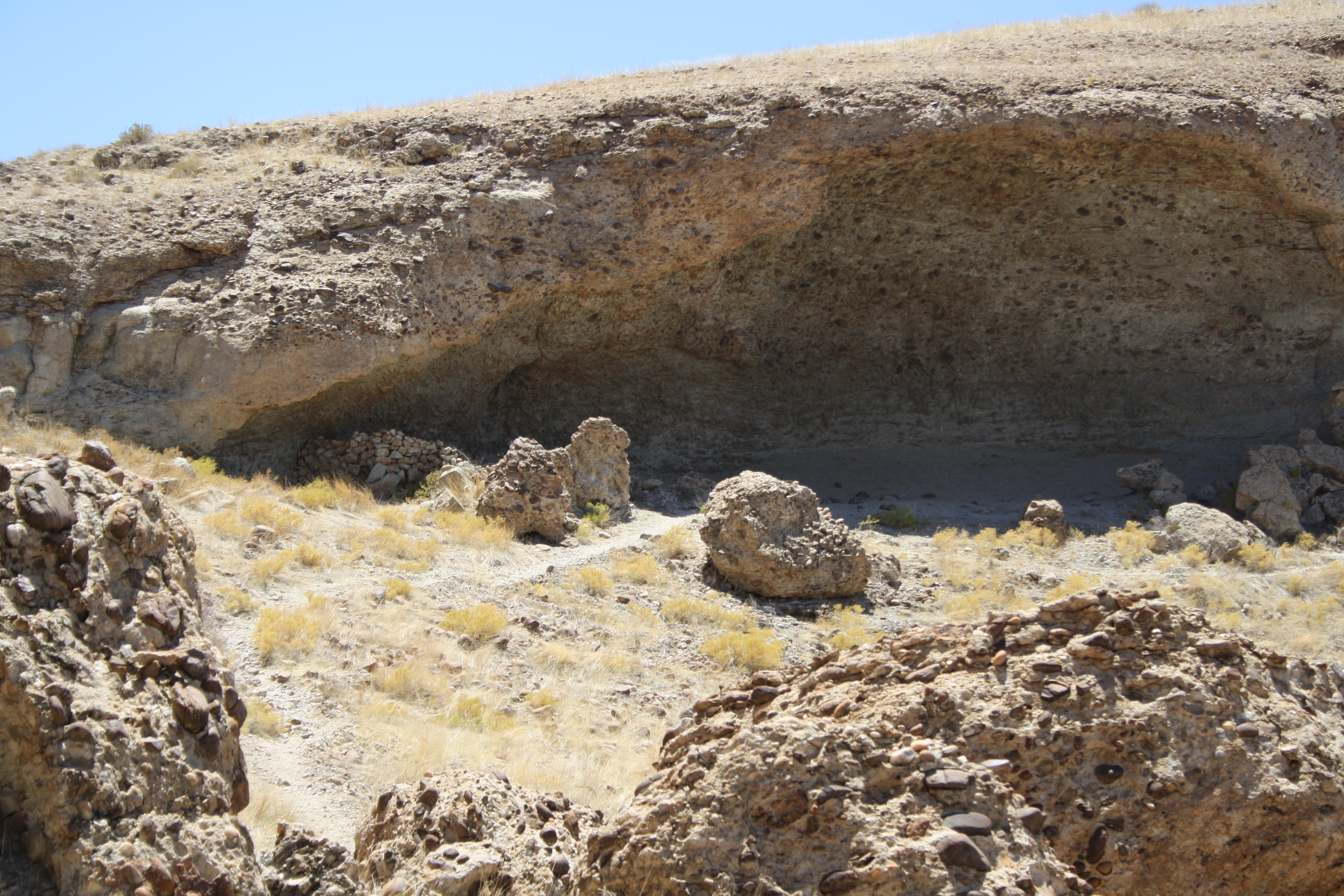
Ruins of the Shelter of Korn and Martin

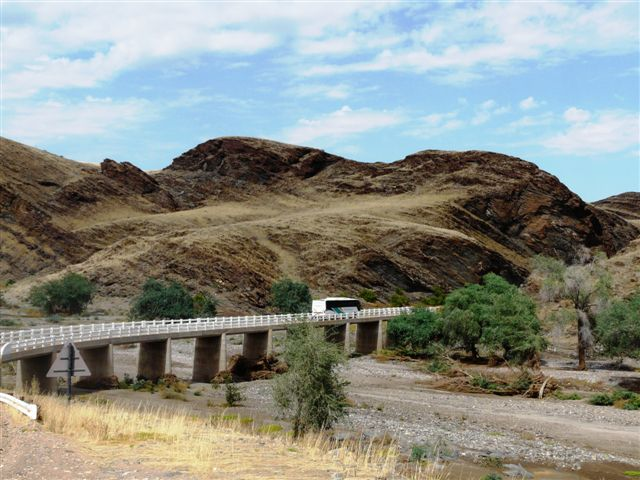
C14 bridge over the Kuiseb Canyon

== See also ==
- List of rivers of Namibia
