= Red Nation (Namibia) =

The Red Nation (Khoekhoe: Khaiǁkhaun) is the main subtribe of the Nama people in Namibia and the oldest Nama group speaking Khoekhoegowab, the language often called Damara/Nama.

The main settlement of the Red Nation is Hoachanas, a small settlement in southern central Namibia, today part of the Hardap Region.

== History ==
=== Pre–colonial period ===
The word Khaiǁkhaun means "great defender" in Khoekhoe, from ǁkhau, "defend". There is no agreement as to where the name Red Nation originated from. Heinrich Vedder claims that the Khaiǁkhaun called themselves ǀAwa-khoi, "red people", whereas Klaus Dierks declares that the Europeans later nicknamed the tribe Red Nation. In any case, the attribution is a reference to their slightly reddish face color.

The first Kaptein of the Khaiǁkhaun was ǂHâb who unified most of the Nama clans at the end of the 17th century. After ǂHâb's death in 1710 the ǁKhauǀgoan (Swartbooi Nama) and the ǂKharoǃoan (Keetmanshoop Nama) under Hendrik Tseib were the first Nama groups to leave the union and to settle at Rehoboth and Keetmanshoop, respectively. Later other groups split from this union one by one and settled at different places in central and southern Namibia, but the Red Nation is still regarded as the main Nama faction.

With Manasse ǃNoreseb's ascent to chieftaincy in 1880, hostilities started between the Red Nation and other Nama clans. Hendrik Witbooi, leader of the ǀKhowesin (Witbooi Nama) was an archenemy of Manasse. His superiority in power forced the Red Nation into alliances with other Nama factions such as the ǁOgain (Groot Doden) and the ǀHaiǀkhauan (Berseba Orlam), but also the Ovaherero, and later the Imperial colonial administration of German South-West Africa.

Witbooi attacked Hoachanas several times and broke the resistance of the Khaiǁkhaun. He installed a rival chief, ǃHoeb ǁOasemab (Fritz Lazarus ǁOaseb) and confiscated the land of the Red Nation. The German protection treaty did not help, the Germans never had the intention to help single parties within the same tribe. Heinrich Vedder opined that Witbooi's plan was to defeat the Nama tribes one by one, lease the land back to them after he conquered it, and gain the position of a Nama Paramount Chief in the process.

=== German colonial period ===
When the Herero and Nama War broke out in which the Germans attacked the indigenous Herero and Nama in German South-West Africa, Manasse ǃNoreseb and Hendrik Witbooi ceased their hostilities and fought together against the Schutztruppe ("protection force", the units deployed to the German colonies). The Red Nation under Manasse, with only 100 armed men, took over the defense of the central eastern area of Aranos, Leonardville, Aminuis, and Hoachanas.

The German Empire's Schutztruppe defeated both the Nama and the Herero during this war. Manasse ǃNoreseb and Hendrik Witbooi died in 1905, survivors were detained in concentration camps, much the same way as the British had set up camps for forced labour in their colony of South Africa during the Anglo-Boer War of 1899–1902. Thousands of people, including women and children, died in these concentration camps from illness, neglect, and malnutrition, leading to a genocide of the Herero and Nama peoples.

After the defeat in the war, Namas were displaced all over the country, and even deported to the German colonies of Togoland and Kamerun. The ethnical structures of the Nama people were destroyed; the Red Nation only got a new chief in 1922.

== Traditional leaders ==
The following people have been chiefs of the Red Nation since the foundation of that tribe in 1695:

1. ǂHâb (1695–1710)
2. ǁKhomab ǂHâmab (1710–1725)
3. ǁKhaub gaib ǁKhomab (1725–1740)
4. ǂÔ-ǁnâib ǁKhaumab (1740–1755)
5. ǀHanab ǂÔǁnâimab (1755–1770)
6. ǃGaob ǀHanamab (1770–1800)
7. Gaméb ǃGaomab (1800–1814)
8. Tsawúb Gamab (1814–1824)
9. !Na-khom Gamab (1824–1840)
10. ǁOaseb !Na-khomab (1840–1867)
11. ǂGoraxab ǀOasib (Barnabas, 1867–1871)
12. Gôbeb ǂGoraxab (Petrus, 1871–1880)
13. Manasse !Noreseb Gamab (1880–1905)
14. ǃHoëb ǁOaseb (Fritz Lazarus, 1922–1936)
15. Noach Tsai-Tsaib (1936–1948)
16. Matheus Kooper (1948–1986)
17. Petrus Simon Moses Kooper (since 1988)
