= Sandfontein, Namibia =

Place in Namibia

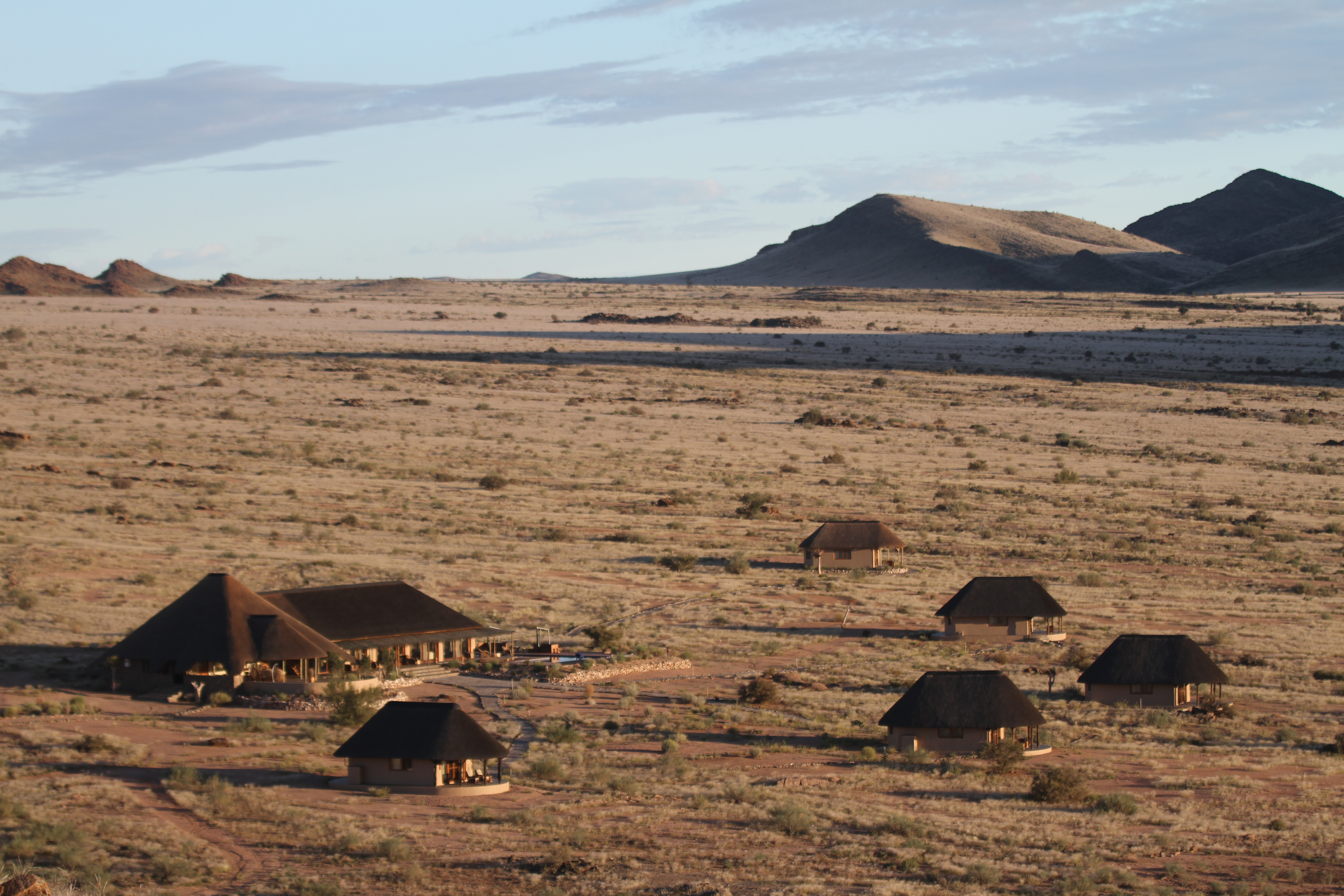
Sandfontein Lodge

Sandfontein is a private property comprising 97,200 hectares in the ǁKaras Region of Namibia. The Battle of Sandfontein was fought at Sandfontein on 26 September 1914. The Battle of Norechab was fought in 1906. Today Sandfontein forms part of the wider Sandfontein nature reserve spanning more than 80,000 hectares and featuring some 25 kilometres of Orange River frontage.

Sandfontein is home to more than 4,000 animals including the leopard, cheetah, kudu, eland, zebra, giraffe, red hartebeest, springbok, ostrich, jackal, aardvark, caracal, and baboon.

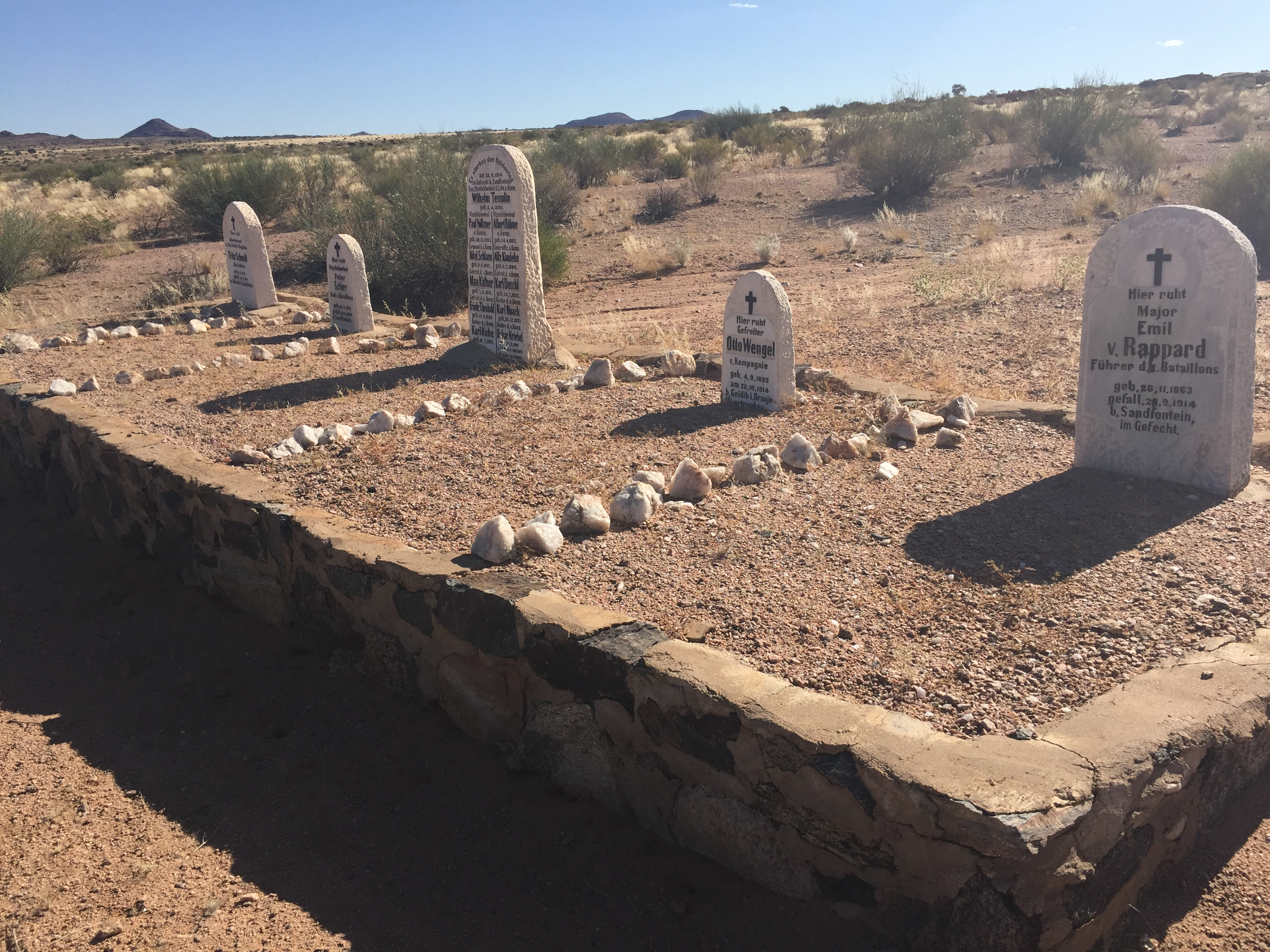
Battle of Sandfontein Grave Site

== Amethyst Mine ==
Pale to dark amethyst quartz was mined sporadically on Girtis farm prior to the major finds of the late 1990s.
