= Mining in Namibia =

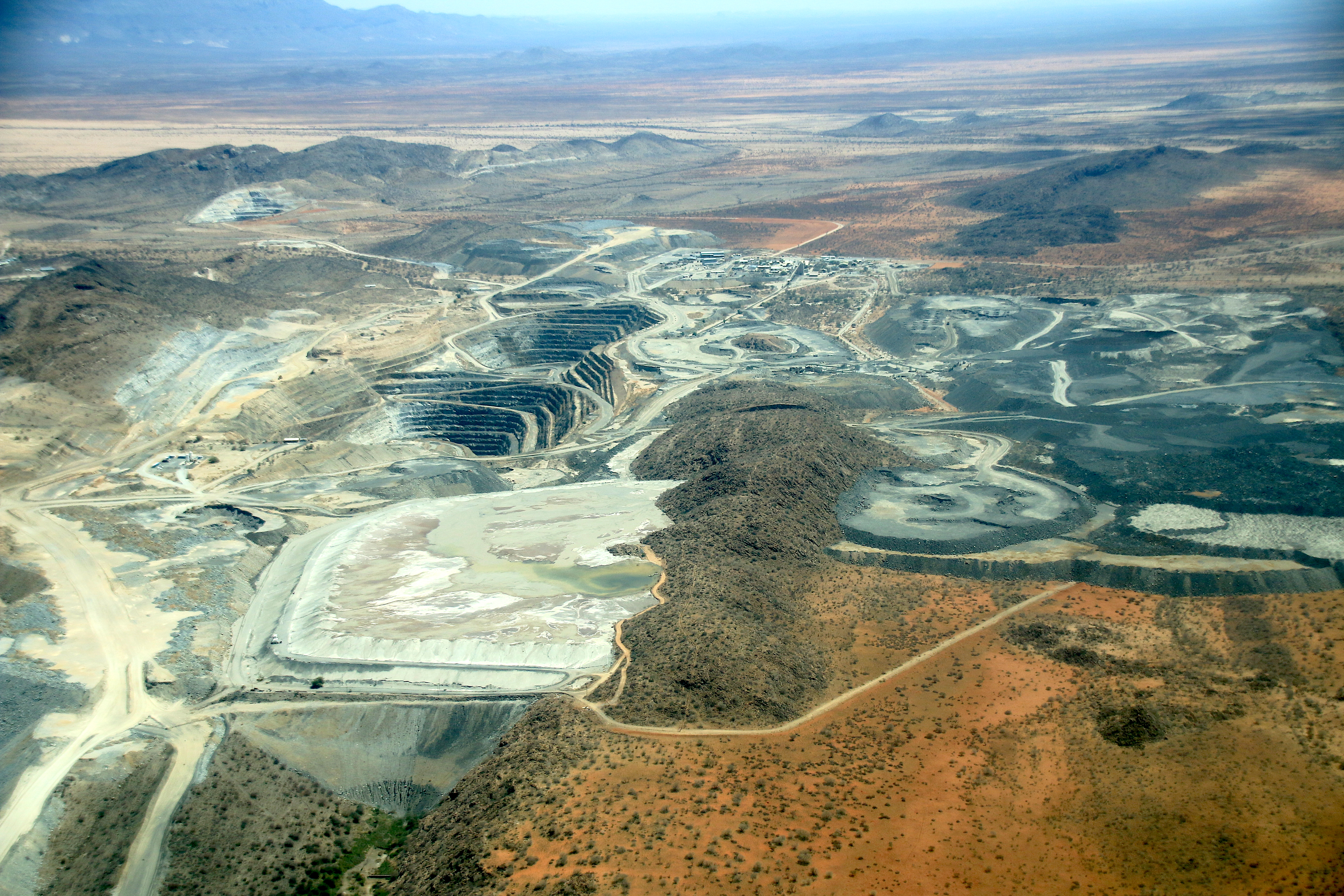
View of Navachab gold mine 21°59′01″S 015°46′00″E

Mining is the biggest contributor to Namibia's economy in terms of revenue. It accounts for 25% of the country's income. Its contribution to the gross domestic product (10.4% in 2009, 8.5% in 2010, 9.5% in 2011, 12.3% in 2012, 13.2% in 2013, 11.6% in 2014) is also very important and makes it one of the largest economic sectors of the country. Namibia produces diamonds, uranium, copper, magnesium, zinc, silver, gold, lead, semi-precious stones and industrial minerals. The majority of revenue (7.2% of GDP in 2011) comes from diamond mining. In 2014, Namibia was the fourth-largest exporter of non-fuel minerals in Africa.

== Overview ==
Namibia has a long tradition of mining. In 2018, mining contributed 14% of GDP and expanded 28%. Extensive exploration in Namibia for base metals, diamonds, gold, natural gas, and uranium has been attributed, in part, to the rise in world commodity prices. Under the Mining Act, the natural resources of Namibia belong to the State. However, the state in Namibia is limited to the role of a grantor-regulator than an owner-operator. One of the main challenges of the mining industry is the lack of water resources, as the availability of fuel and electric power.

A mining policy in Namibia was developed in 2003 through research with the information made available by key stakeholders.

== Production ==
World Bank pointed out that mining in Namibia grew an average of 4.6% over the 2000–2012 period. The growth of the mining sector is influenced by the global economy and demand, in contrast to the agricultural industry in Namibia, which is influenced by environmental conditions.

In 2019, the mining industry contributed over 300 million dollars to government revenue. The whole industry contributed around 2.2 billion dollars to the national economy in the same period. However, a drop in diamond and uranium production caused a contraction of 11,1%. Lower mineral commodity prices led to the declining expenditure on exploration.

In 2006, manganese, diamond, and fluorspar output increased by 158%, 24%, and 15%, respectively, compared with that of 2005, and copper, lead, wollastonite, and zinc posted significant production declines.

The increase in manganese output was attributable to the expansion of production at the reopened Purity Mine (formerly the Otjisondu Mine). The decline in copper output could be attributed in part to instability during the transition of ownership of Ongopolo Mining and Processing Ltd. Lead and zinc output declined in part because of a short strike by workers at the Rosh Pinah mine.

== Employment ==
In 2019, the mining industry paid over 300 million dollars in wages and salaries and provided 16,324 direct jobs with 9,027 permanent employees. Temporary jobs figured out 800, while 6,515 were contractor jobs.

In February 2020, mining operations were suspended at Tschudi because the oxide ore body was depleted, provocating the loss of 66 direct contractor jobs. For the same cause, mining operations ceased at Skorpion Zinc, and the mine closed due to safety concerns. Around 1,500 jobs were lost.

Depending on economic up and downswings, mining provided for around 6,000 to 8,000 direct jobs between 2007 and 2014. The artisans for the industry are educated in the Namibian Institute of Mining and Technology (NIMT) in Arandis, Keetmanshoop, and Tsumeb, as well as at University of Namibia (UNAM)'s Faculty of Engineering and Information Technology in Ongwediva. Namibia University of Science and Technology (NUST)'s Faculty of Engineering in Windhoek also provides mining education. The global push for transition and energy minerals has sparked economic concerns among local communities. According to an investigation by journalist Tracy Tafirenyika in The Namibian, residents in towns like Uis have reported feeling excluded from employment opportunities and economic benefits despite an increase in heavy mining traffic.

== Structure of the mineral industry ==
The Government encourages private sector exploration and development according to guidelines set out in its 2003 paper entitled "The Mineral Policy of Namibia". The Ministry of Mines and Energy and its Diamond Affairs, Energy, and Mining Directorates regulate Namibia’s mining and petroleum industries, and the Ministry concerns itself with the provision of national exploration and mining databases and competitive exploration and mining policy and regulations. The Ministry of Trade and Industry is responsible for regulating manufacturing activity, which includes mineral beneficiation, the production of cement, and the processing of semiprecious stones; the Ministry also promotes resource-based development.

Epangelo Mining is a mining company owned by the government. It was founded in 2009 with the aim to govern the rights on six mineral resources that are deemed strategic for Namibia, and for which new exploration rights must be held by government. The six resources are: diamonds, gold, coal, uranium, copper, and rare earth minerals.

The larger mining operations in Namibia tended to be funded and operated by domestic and international investors. Numerous local operations were involved in smaller-scale industrial mineral production, especially the semiprecious gemstone sector.

== Commodities ==
=== Cement ===
Cement had been imported since the closure of the Otjiwarongo factory of African Portland Cement several years ago. Holcim (Namibia) (Pty.) Ltd., which was owned by Holcim S.A. of Switzerland, 54%, and the Aveng Group of South Africa, 46% (and known as Alpha Cement prior to 2004), imported about 25,000 metric tons per month of cement to meet local demand. In 2005, Cheetah Cement Factory, which was a joint venture of Whale Rock Cement of Namibia and CP Cimento e Participacoes S.A. of Brazil, proposed to import cement from Brazil until a 500,000-t/yr-capacity cement plant near Otjiwarongo was built. In late 2005, Cheetah Cement imported 36,000 metric tons of cement from Brazil.

Ohorongo Cement near Otavi started production in 2010. Cheetah Cement also got a factory in 2018, so that there is now an oversupply of cement to the Namibian market.

=== Copper ===
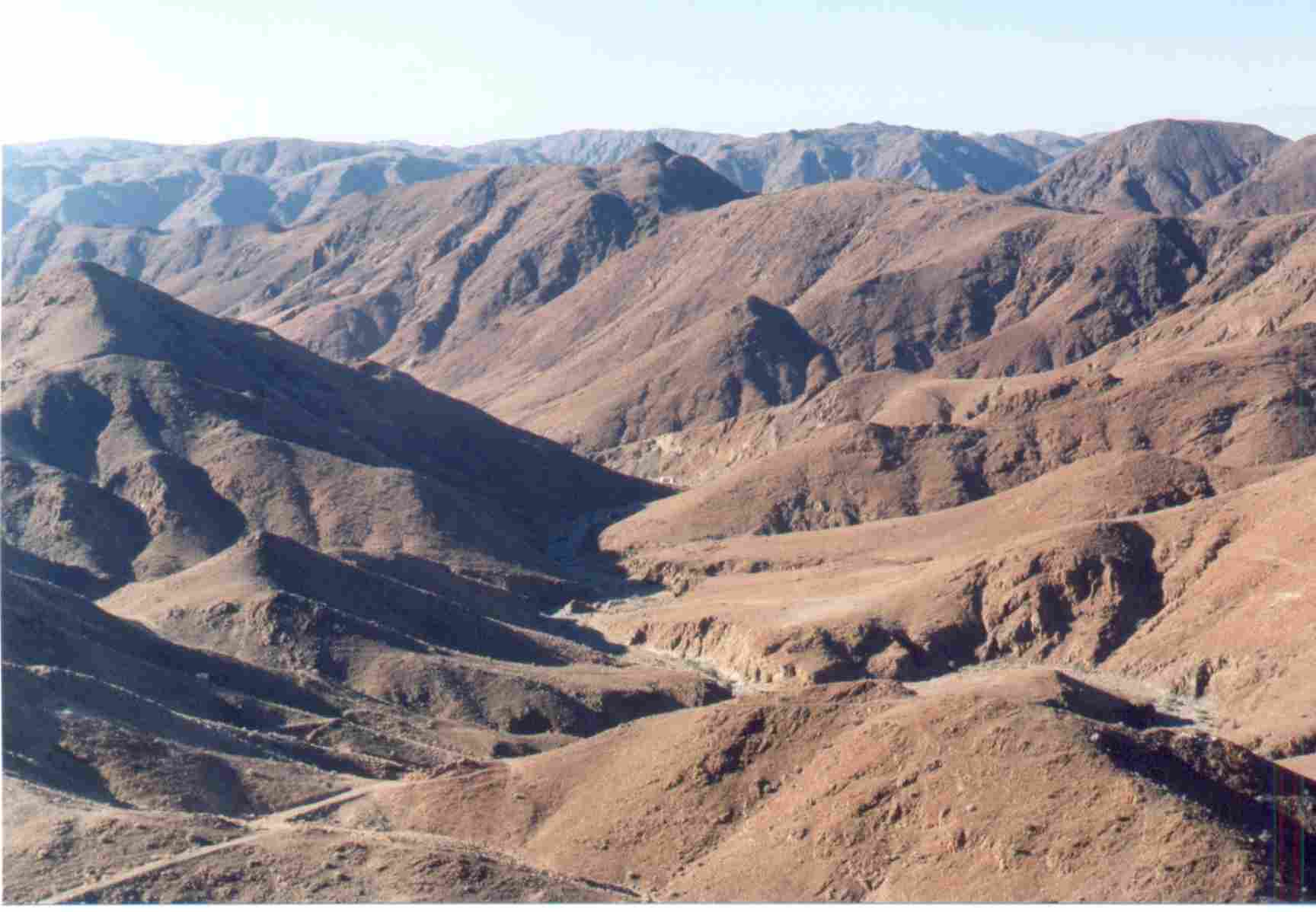
Haib copper prospect, Namibia. The adit is in the centre of the photo.

In 2006, Weatherly International plc of the United Kingdom agreed to acquire 56% interest in financially distressed Ongopolo; Weatherly subsequently increased its equity interest in the company to 100%. Ongopolo operated the Kombat, the Matchless, and the Otjihase Mines. Ongopolo suspended operations at the Tsumeb copper smelter in mid-2006, relined the 30,000-metric-ton-per-year (t/yr)-capacity reverberatory furnace, and reopened the smelter in August. A second reverberatory furnace at Tsumeb remained inactive, pending renovation.

Ongopolo evaluated the development of an underground mine at the Tschudi copper-silver prospect. Other copper exploration activity in Namibia included that of Copper Resources Corp. of South Africa on the Haib project, Helio Resource Corp. of Canada on the Honib prospect, Teck Cominco Ltd. of Canada on the Kaoko project, and Yale Resources Ltd. of Canada on the Leicester prospect.

Companies that explored for gold in 2006 included Forsys Metals Corp. of Canada on the Ondundu prospect, Teal Exploration & Mining Inc. of Canada on the Otjikoto prospect, and Teck Cominco on the Vredelus prospect. Yale Resources worked on the Makuru (also known as the Otjimakuru) project. As of 2010, the only operational gold mine in Namibia is the Navachab Gold Mine. Now new company called Auryx Gold Namibia was formed and exploring the Otjikoto Gold deposit

=== Diamond ===
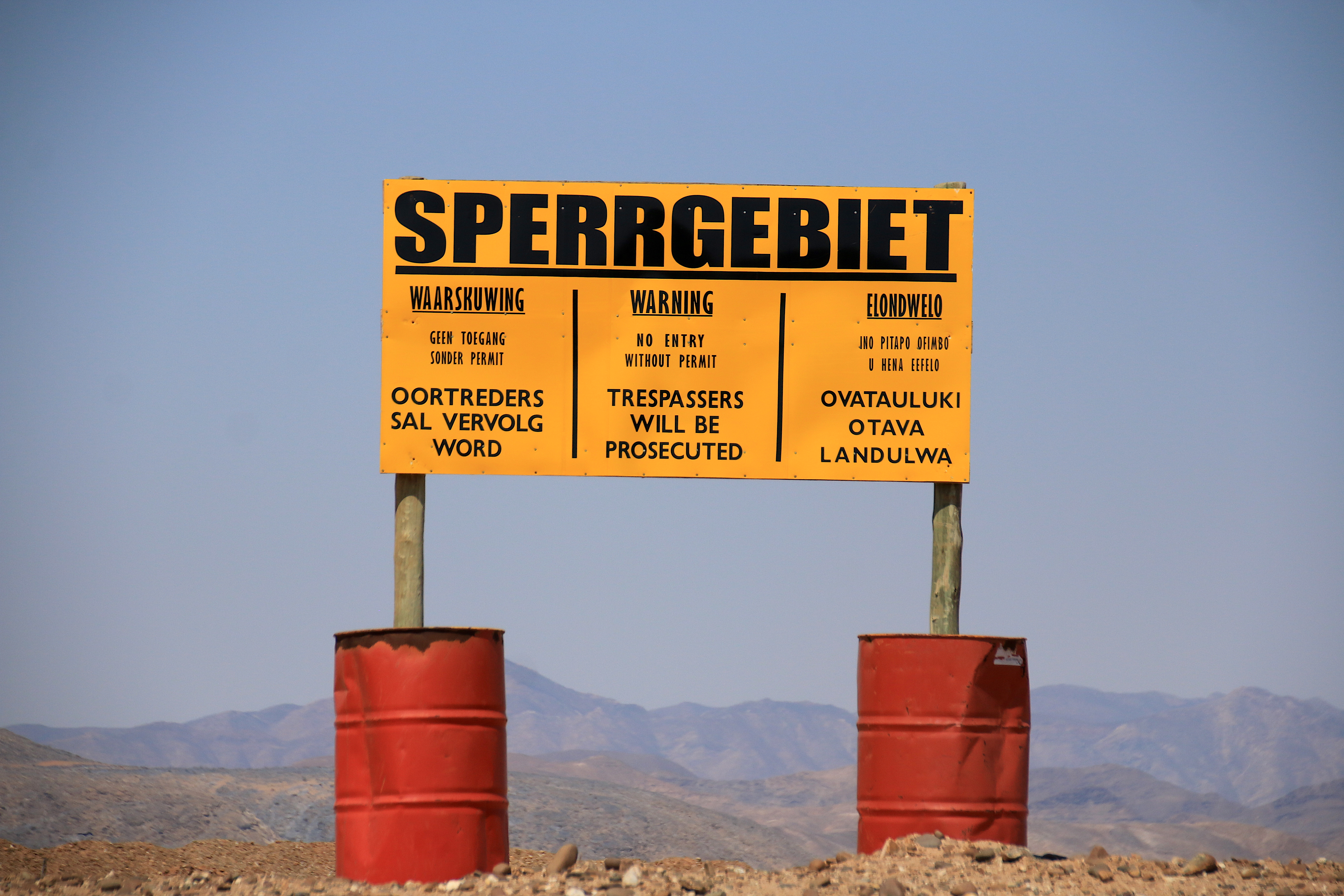
Diamond restricted area

Diamond remained the most economically significant mineral commodity produced by the mining industry of Namibia. The country produced about 2% of the world’s gem-quality diamonds, which placed it as the eighth-ranked producer of gem diamond in terms of value. Diamonds contributed N$2,5 billion (US$235 million) in revenue to the government in 2013.

In 2020, the Bank of Namibia forecasted a record decline of 24.6% in real terms due to a lower demand caused by COVID-19 outbreak. The president of the Chamber of Mines of Namibia Zebra Kasete said the decline in demand dampened the flow in the diamond pipeline.

Namdeb Diamond Corp. (Pty.) Ltd., which was a joint venture between De Beers Centenary AG and the Namibian Government, with each having 50%, was the country’s leading diamond producer. During 2006, Namdeb, its contractors, and its subsidiaries produced more than 2,000,000 carats (400 kg). The partners also negotiated the Namdeb Sales Agreement in 2006, which created the Namibia Diamond Trading Co., to sort and value the volume of Namdeb’s production that would be marketed to the domestic diamond-cutting industry.

=== Granite ===
Granite is mined in Walvis Bay.

=== Iron ===
Lodestone’s Dordabis iron ore mine is a small mine that produced 4,000 tons of low-grade iron ore when it started in 2015. It is Namibia’s only iron mine and also produces magnetite and hematite products. Ohorongo uses the magnetite of this mine for cement manufacturing. Lodestone mine yielded 91,000 tons of iron ore between 2015 and 2022.

=== Lead and zinc ===
Contributing to the decline in Namibian zinc output in 2006 was the nearly 3-week fire-related suspension of zinc metal production operations at the Skorpion zinc facility and a strike at the Rosh Pinah Mine for higher wages, which lasted for about 2 weeks and adversely affected lead and zinc concentrate production. Kumba Resources Ltd. of South Africa proposed to reduce its 89.5% equity interest in Rosh Pinah to about 50%. A local investor group, which included PE Minerals (Namibia) (Pty.) Ltd., was expected to acquire Kumba’s divested interest.

=== Lithium ===
Lithium deposits have long been known to exist in Namibian mines but were rarely exploited. Lithium was extracted from lepidolite between 1939 and 1950, and from petalite between 1947 and 1998. Since 1990, the only traceable lithium production was a 500 tons export in 2018. In light of increased global demand in the 2020s, Lithium mining is expected to restart in Namibia. An initial production of Lithium concentrate at Uis mine occurred in 2023.

=== Marble ===
Marble is mined near Karibib.

=== Petroleum ===
Several companies explored for oil and gas in the Orange Basin off the shore of southern Namibia since the 1960s. In 1974 the Kudu gas field was discovered. It did not lead to commercial production, as apartheid sanctions hindered further exploration and commercialisation. In 2022, Shell and TotalEnergies independently announced significant quantities of light oil and gas. Further explorations were also successful, so that by 2026 Wood Mackenzie described the country as "a global exploration hot spot".

Offshore petroleum activity now includes exploration on Block 1711 by the joint venture of Z.A.O. Sintezneftegas of Russia (70%), Petroleum, Oil & Gas Corp. of South Africa (PetroSA) (10%), EnerGulf Resources Inc. of the United States (10%), and the National Petroleum Corporation of Namibia (NAMCOR) (7%). Onshore exploration included that of the joint venture of Circle Oil Namibia Ltd. (90%) and NAMCOR (10%). In 2006, Mitusi Atlantic Energy BV (15%) joined the joint venture of BHP of Australia (75%) and PetroSA (10%), which held Blocks 2813A, 2814B, and 2914.

=== Phosphate ===
The Sandpiper phosphate mine is a planned activity on the seabed of the Atlantic off the shore of Walvis Bay. An exploration license has been granted in 2011 but an environmental clearance certificate for Sandpiper was revoked in 2017.

=== Salt ===
Salt is produced at the Atlantic coast of Namibia through solar evaporation of sea water. There are two major producers. Walvis Bay Salt produces around 1 million tons per annum, both for the chemical industry and, under the "Cerebos" brand, for domestic use. Salt Company Swakopmund produces only table salt. The annual production is approximately 120,000, the salt is marketed as "Light Flow".

=== Uranium ===
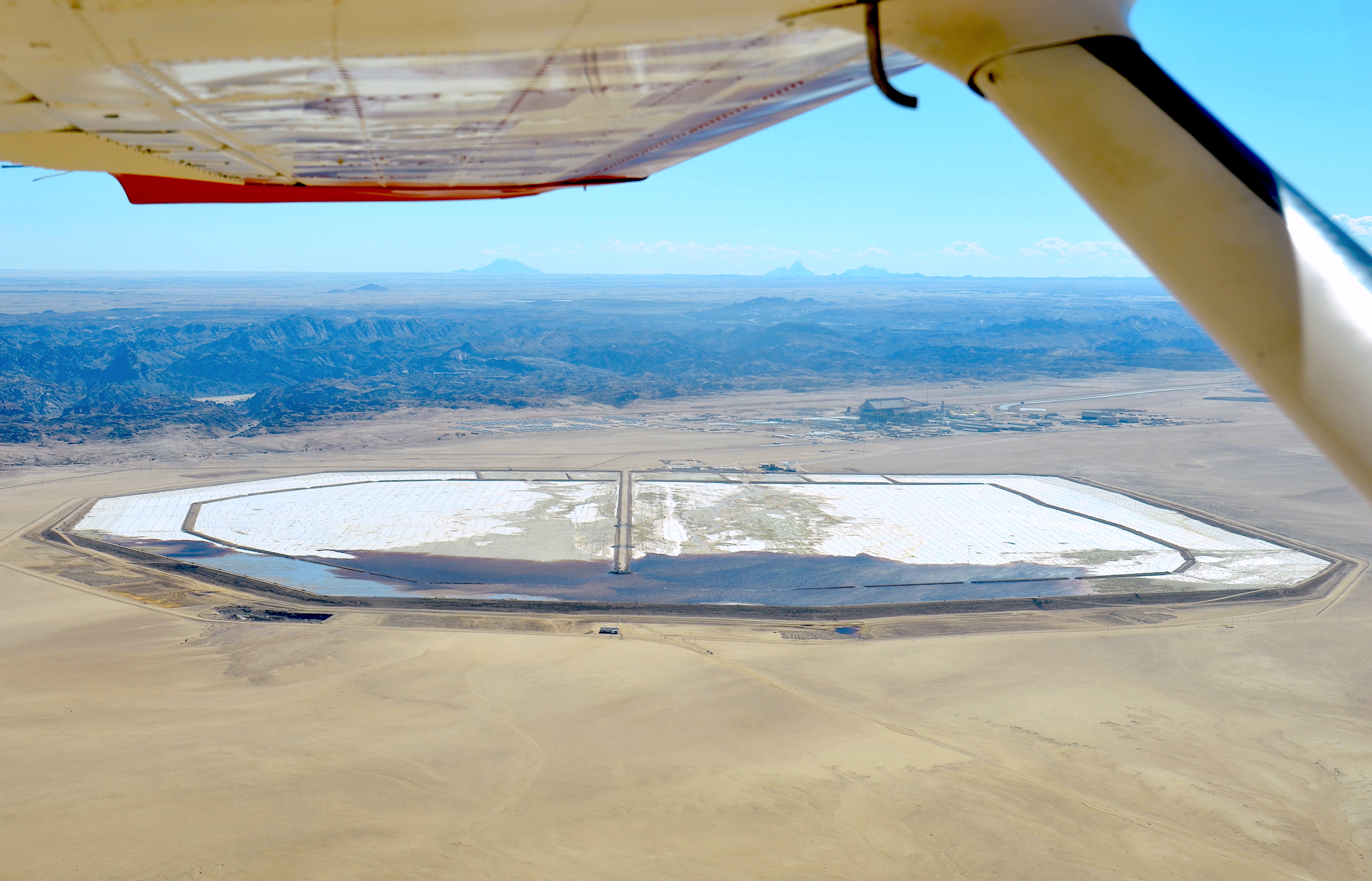
Aerial view of Husab Uranium Mine

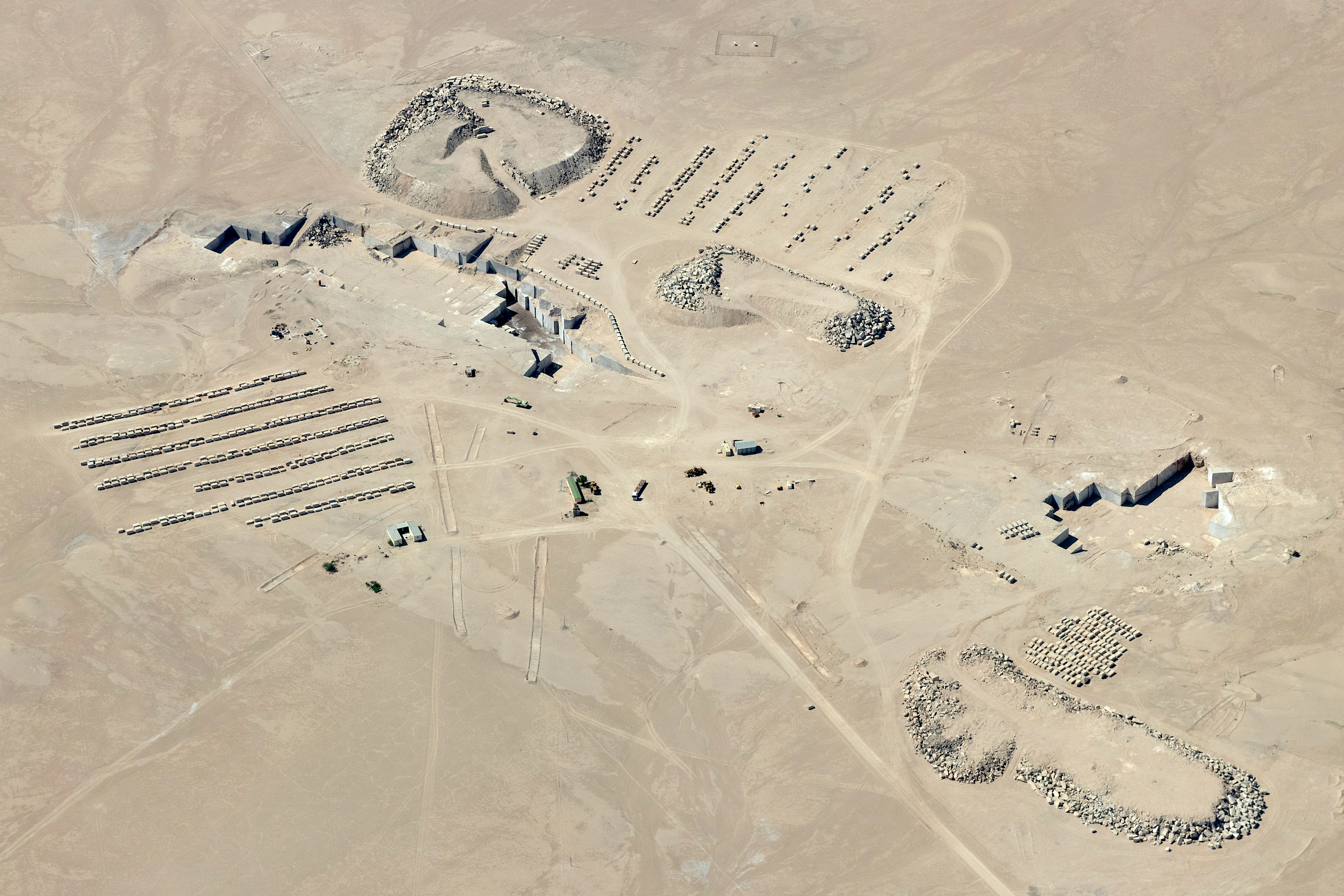
Granite mining near Walvis Bay

Namibia was the sixth ranked producer of uranium, producing about 8% of the world’s uranium in 2006. Due to the opening of the Langer Heinrich Uranium (LHU) mine in 2007, the country in 2009 had raised its share to nearly 10%, but when Uranium prices fell after the Fukushima incident production was reduced. In 2012, Namibia produced 7.1% of Uranium oxide, behind Kazakhstan, Canada, Australia, and Niger.

Rössing Uranium Ltd. processed about 12 million metric tons of ore in 2006 and produced 3,617 t of U_{3}O_{8}. Production was exported to the Asia and the Pacific, the European, and the North American markets by Rio Tinto Uranium; Rössing shareholders had no offtake rights.

Earlier this decade, Rössing had announced that the Rössing Mine would be closed in 2009. By 2005, the increase in the world market price of uranium allowed Rössing to plan to extend operations to 2016. In 2006, positive exploration results and continued favorable uranium market conditions allowed Rössing to propose that the mine’s life could be extended to 2021.

In late 2006, Paladin Resources Ltd. commissioned the Langer Heinrich uranium (LHU) mine and oxide (U_{3}O_{8}, or yellowcake) plant. LHU produced 1 170 tonnes of processed uranium called yellow cake in 2009. This mine is under care and maintenance since 2018, awaiting higher uranium prices.

Exploration activity and evaluation of uranium mineralization in Namibia in 2006 included that of Bannerman Resources Ltd. of Australia on the Goanikontes and Swakop River prospects, Extract Resources Ltd. of Australia on the Husab Uranium Project, Forsys Metals on the Valencia project, Metals Australia Ltd. of Australia (formerly Australian United Gold Ltd.) on the Engo Valley and Mile 72 projects, Rössing Uranium on the SH and SK anomalies on Rössing’s mining lease near Arandis, UranMin Inc. on the Trekkopje deposit, and Western Australian Metals Ltd. of Australia on the Marinica project. In early 2006, Xemplar Energy Corp. of Canada acquired Namura Minerals Resources (Pty.) Ltd., which held the Aus, the Cape Cross, and the Warmbad uranium projects. Namura subsequently acquired a reconnaissance license in the Engo Valley area.

== Mining towns ==
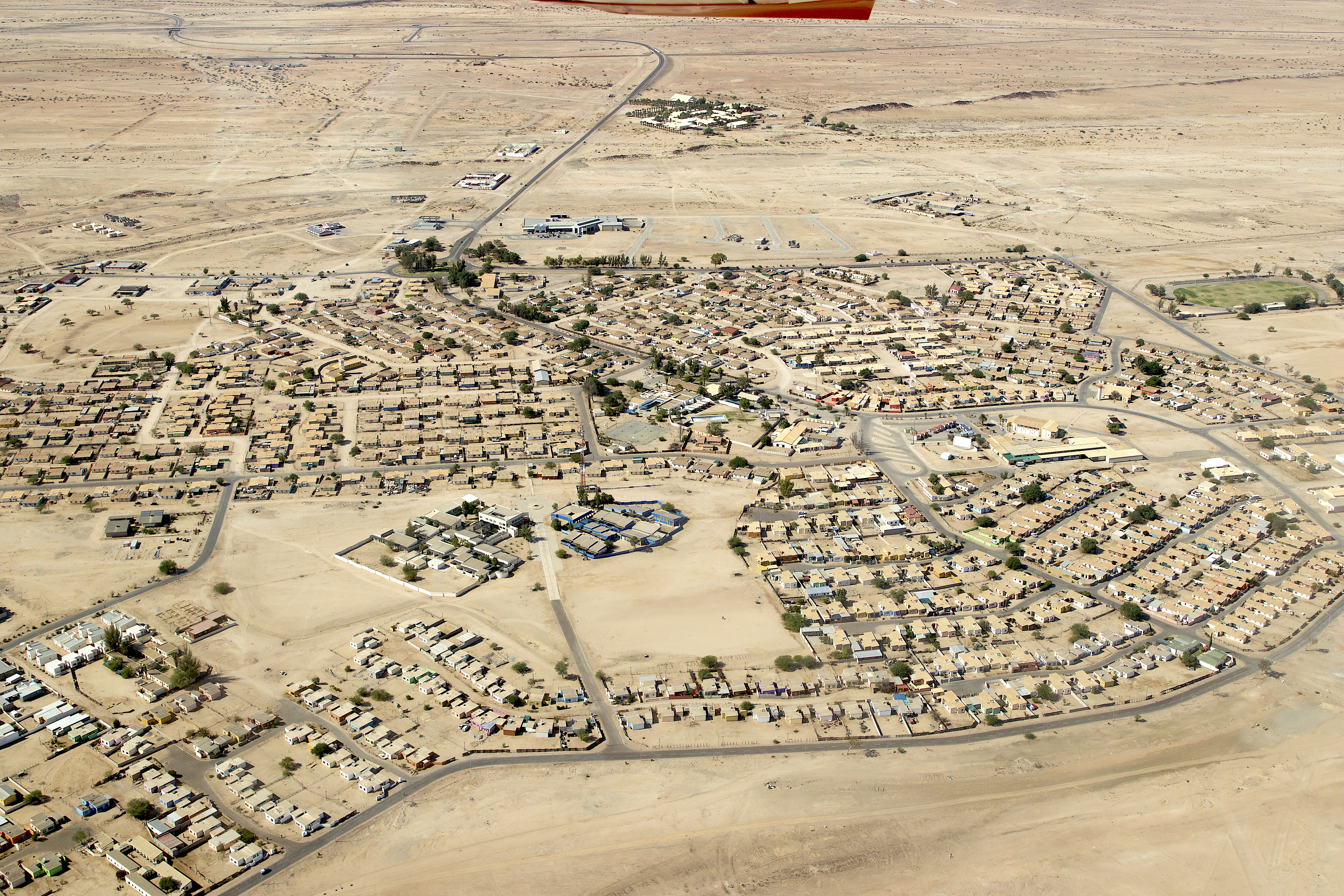
Uranium mining town Arandis

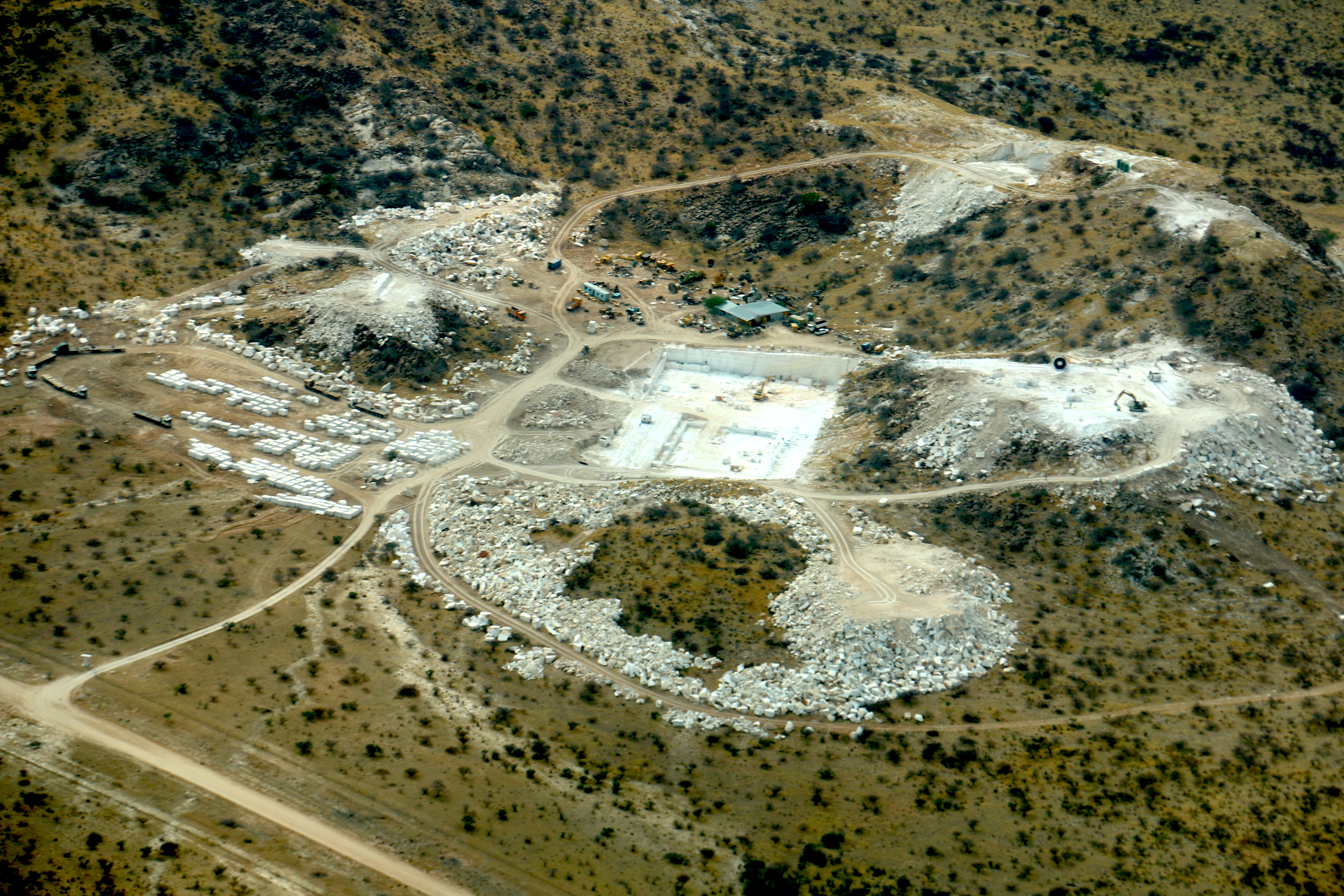
Marble mining in Karibib

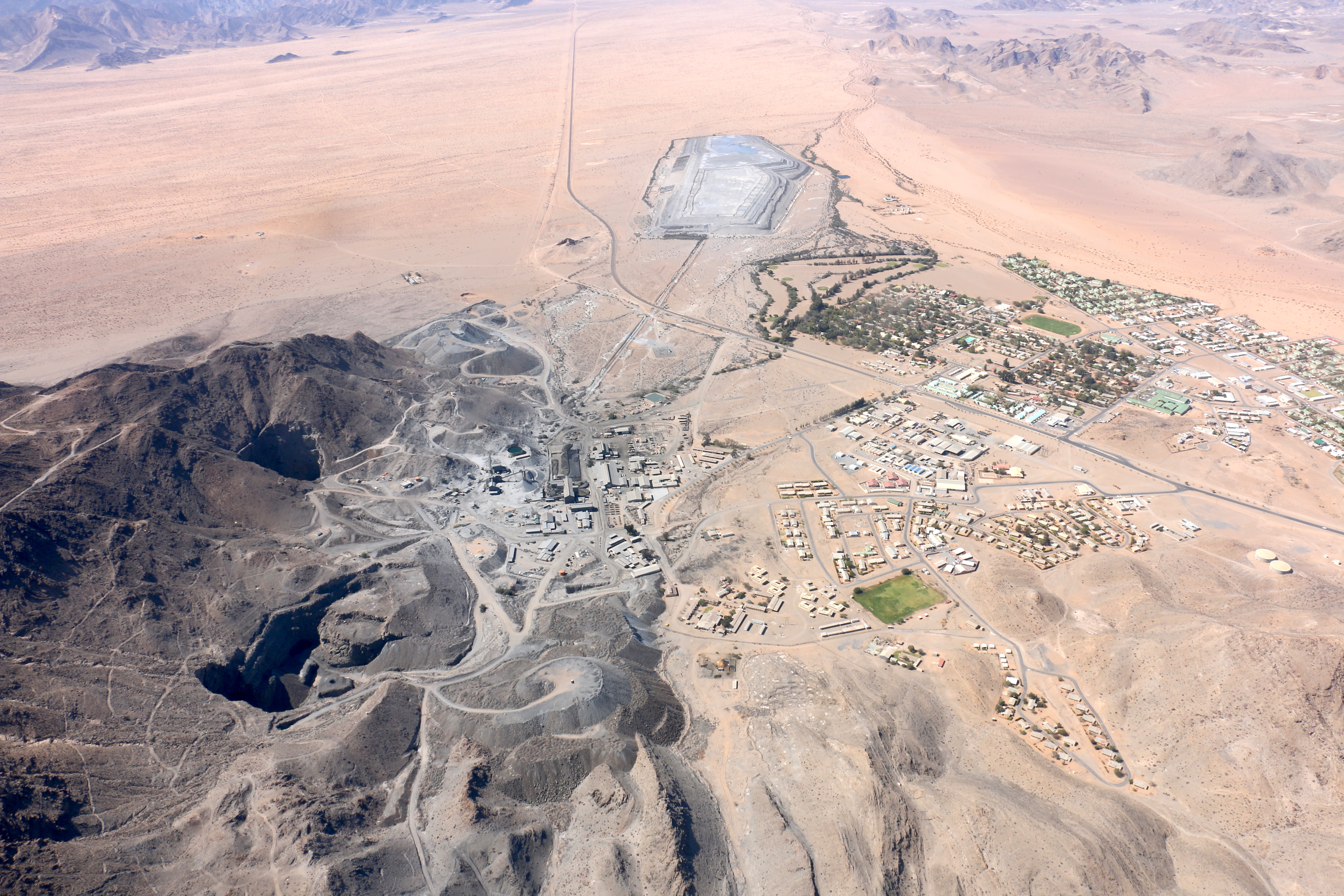
Aerial view of Rosh Pinah Zinc mine and town

Several towns and settlements in Namibia were established solely for mining. Some of them are today ghost towns, and some are in danger of becoming one due to a lack of diversification of economic activities. The major mining towns in Namibia are:

- Arandis was established in 1978 for the workers of the Rössing uranium mine and until 1992 administered by its owner, Rössing Uranium Limited. The settlement was then handed over to the newly established Government of Namibia, and gained 'town' status in 1994. Arandis is close to three of Namibia's biggest mines: Rössing uranium, Husab Mine, and Trekkopje mine, all of which extract uranium. It is also the home of the Namibian Institute of Mining and Technology.
- Karibib is close to the Navachab Gold Mine, by far the largest employer in town. It is also strategically situated for road and rail transport; 1,000 trucks pass the town per day. Marble is also mined near Karibib.
- Oranjemund was established in 1928 when rich alluvial diamond deposits were discovered north of the Orange River. Industrial diamond mining started in 1935 by the diamond mining company Consolidated Diamond Mines (today Namdeb). Houses for workers were erected in 1936. Oranjemund was privately owned, run and subsidised by the mining company and had no political leadership. The first mayor was elected in 2015 after the settlement was handed over to the Government of Namibia and declared a town in 2011. The entire area along the shore of the Atlantic Ocean had been proclaimed restricted (the Sperrgebiet) in 1908 due to the occurrence of alluvial diamonds. Since then the public was forbidden to enter it, and Oranjemund itself was accessible only for mine workers and their families. Entrance to town required an invitation from within, and crossing the border from South Africa required prior application. Only in 2017 was the town opened to the general public.
- Otjiwarongo services the B2Gold mine which is the largest employer in the Otjozondjupa region. There is also the Okorusu fluorspar mine 48 kilometres (30 mi) north of the town. Mining overall constitutes 20% of the town's economy.
- Rosh Pinah is home to, and entirely dependent on, two mines, both mainly extracting zinc and lead. The Rosh Pinah mine was established in 1969 and has since then been in continuous operation. Skorpion Zinc opened in 2001 and is the eighth-largest zinc mine in the world. It employs 1,900 people.
- Tsumeb is situated directly on a large mineralised pipe which was mined since prehistoric times. The town was founded as a mining and smelting town and until today runs an annual Copper Festival. The Tsumeb mine operated from 1907 to 1996, extracting copper, lead, zinc, gold, germanium and cadmium.
- Uis was established in 1958 as workers' settlement to exploit local tin deposits. Mining started in 1960 and grew to be the world's largest open cast tin mine. Yield was very low, and the mine was sustainable only because South Africa was economically isolated due to its apartheid politics. When sanctions were lifted in 1990, the Uis mine was no longer viable. In the 2010s investments and work started again at the old mine.

== Notable mines ==
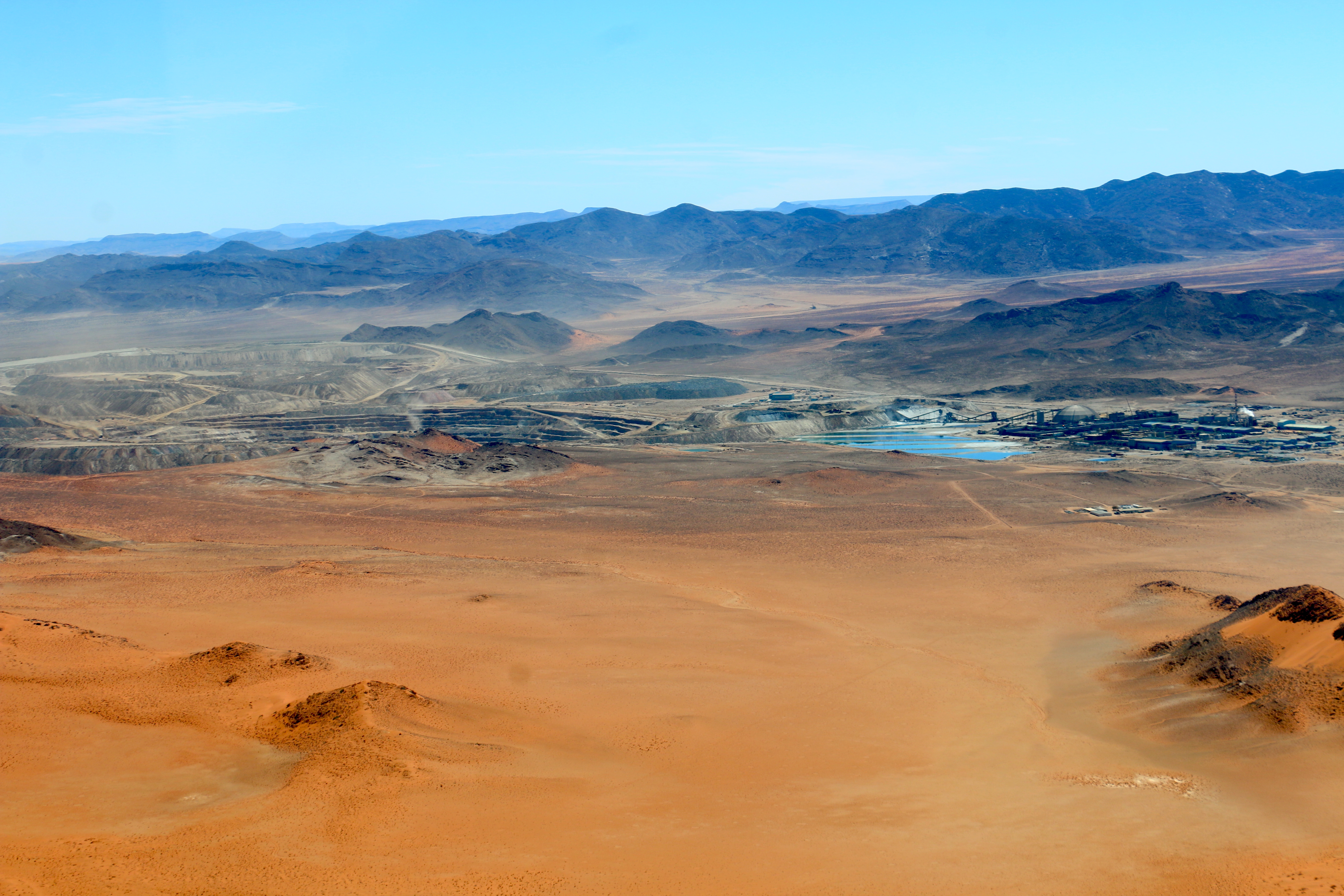
Skorpion Zinc mine

- B2Gold mine, an open-pit gold mine established in 2014 and owned by B2Gold. It is located approximately 70 kilometres (43 mi) northwest of Otjiwarongo and 50 kilometres (31 mi) southwest of Otavi within the Otjozondjupa region.
- Husab Mine, uranium mine near Arandis
- Kudu gas field offshore near Oranjemund
- Langer Heinrich Mine, uranium mine near Swakopmund
- Navachab Gold Mine near Karibib
- Okorusu Mine, fluorspar mine near Otjiwarongo
- Rössing uranium mine in Arandis
- Rosh Pinah mine, zinc and lead mine in Rosh Pinah
- Skorpion Zinc mine in Rosh Pinah
- Three Aloes mine, tantalum mine in Uis

== Legal framework ==
Related to the mining industry, the main legislation is the Minerals (Prospecting and Mining) Act 33 of 1992 (Minerals Act). In the terms of this act, owners of the land don't have mining rights because natural resources belong to the state. For getting the right prospect or mine an area, a mining license or a mining claim is required, provided by the Minister of Mines and Energy of Namibia.

Namibia’s mining industry is regulated by the Diamond Act, 1999; the Minerals (Prospecting and Mining) Act, 1992; and the Minerals Development Fund of Namibia Act of 1996. The petroleum sector is governed by the Petroleum (Exploration and Production) Act, 1991; the Petroleum (Taxation) Act, 1991; the Petroleum (Exploration and Production) Amendment Act, 1993; the Petroleum Laws Amendment Act, 1998; the Model Petroleum Agreement, 1998; and the Petroleum Products and Energy Amendment Act, 2000.

In 2006, the Government confirmed a royalty schedule that originally had been introduced in 2004. A 3% royalty was levied on the market value of base, precious, and rare metals and nonnuclear mineral fuels. A 2% royalty was levied on industrial minerals and nuclear mineral fuels.

In Namibia, mining legislation is under revision. According to the Intergovernmental Forum on Mining, Minerals, Metals, and Sustainable Development (IGF), Namibia counts with a strong regulation around the development of environmental impact assessments and environmental management plans through the Environmental Management Act. However, legislation on occupational health and safety, and water and waste management is outdated.

=== Environmental legislation related to mining ===
Environmental Management Act 7 of 2007 promotes the sustainable management of the environment and the use of natural resources. This act gives the Minister of Environment and Tourism the authority to regulate activities that could damage the environment. Activities of mining and exploration require a certificate of an environmental commissioner.

=== Labour legislation related to mining ===
Labour legislation for mining consists of Labour Act 11 of 2007 and Labour Act of 1992. The Labour Act, 2007 requires a safe working environment, and without risk to the health of employees; safe plants, machinery, and systems of work; and safe use, handling, storage, and transportation of articles or substances. Labour Act, 1992 relates to the health and safety of workspace. It sets requirements for medical surveillance, first-aid and emergency arrangements, and safety of machinery, welfare, and facilities in the workplace.
