= Abbabis =

Train station in Namibia

Coordinates: 22.141733°S 15.724364°E

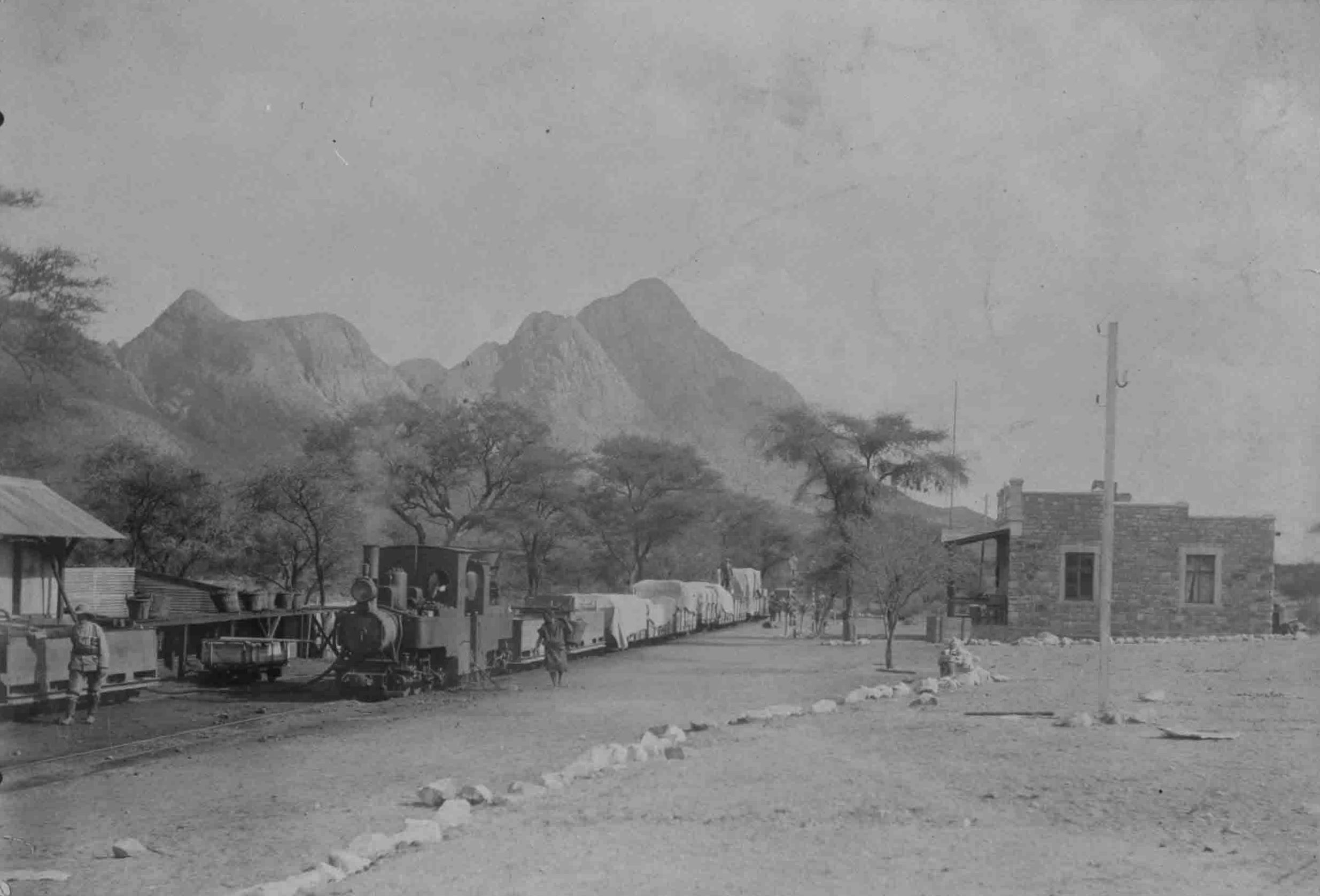
Ababis station

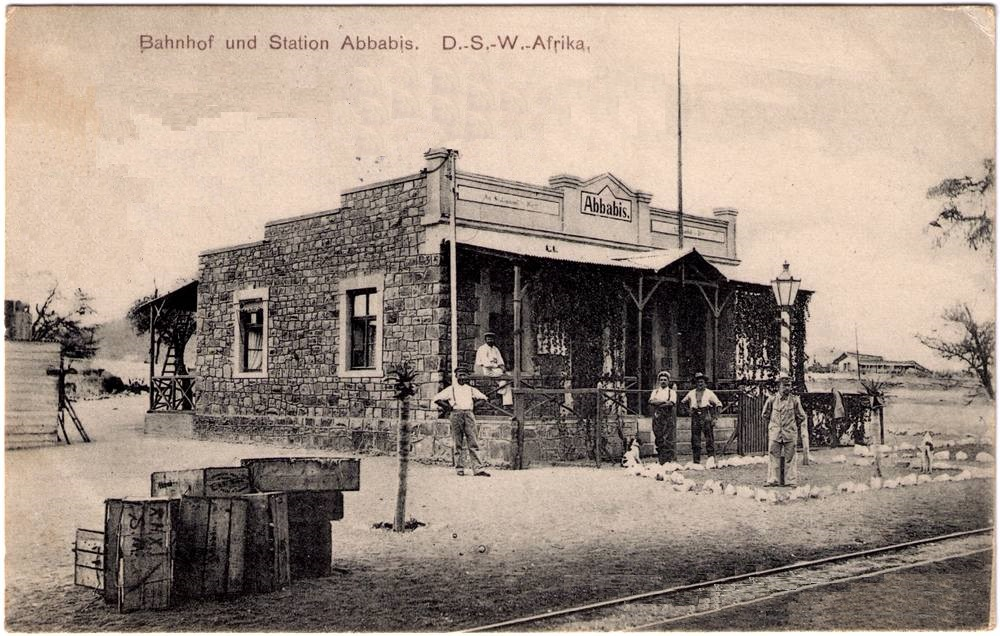
Abbabis station

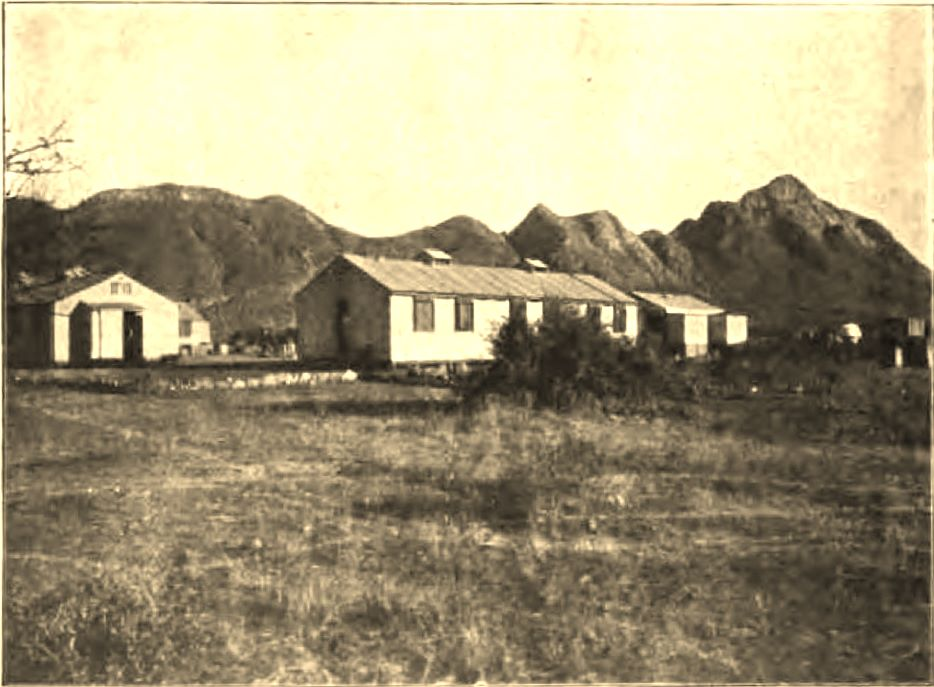
Former convalescent home

Abbabis is a disused railway station southwest of Karibib in the Erongo Region of western Namibia on the 600 mm (1 ft 11 5/8 in) dismantled narrow gauge Swakopmund–Windhoek railway line established in 1900. When this line was converted to 1,067 mm (3 ft 6 in) from 1910 onwards, it lo longer passed Abbabis.

The etymology of the station is not clear: Either it is from the Khoikhoi language for 'red spot', or from Nama language abas for 'gourd', as in the case of a farm approximately 300 km (200 miles) further south.

Near to the station was a German convalescent home (Genesungsheim), in which the soldiers of the imperial protection force (Schutztruppen) could recover. A ruin of its office building is still visible on a paddock. The soldiers camped in tents and barracks. The rails have long been lifted. The station building has been extended at its front and rear. It is now used as a private residence. The water supply is still from the old well.
