= Omaruru =

Omaruru may refer to:

- Omaruru, Namibia
- Omaruru Constituency, Namibia
- Omaruru River, Namibia
