= Germina Shitaleni =

Namibian politician

Germina Ndapua Shitaleni (21 June 1970—1 March 2015) was a Namibian SWAPO politician. She was mayor of Swakopmund from 2008 to 2010, and a member of the National Council representing the Erongo Region from 2010 until her death.

== Life ==
Germina Shitaleni was born on 21 June 1970 in Windhoek. She trained as a medical technologist, and also gained a qualification in human resource practice.

Shitaleni became a Swakopmund local authority councillor in 2004. She was chair of the Local Authority Management Committee from 2004 to 2006, deputy mayor of Swakopmund from 2006 to 2008, and mayor of Swkopmund from 2008 to 2010.

In the 2010 regional elections, Shitaleni won the Swakopmund Constituency with 5,132 votes and became constituency councillor. Shitaleni became the fourth National Council member for the Erongo Region from 2011 to 2015. During that time she was also a member of the National Council Women Caucus, and the Standing Committee on Habitat. Within SWAPO she was chair of the Standing Committee on Gender, Youth, Information and Communication Technology.

Shitaleni, who had had cancer for several years, died on 1 March 2015 in Windhoek.
