= Xanthoparmelia arrecta =

Scientific classification
- Domain: Eukaryota
- Kingdom: Fungi
- Division: Ascomycota
- Class: Lecanoromycetes
- Order: Lecanorales
- Family: Parmeliaceae
- Genus: Xanthoparmelia
- Species: X. arrecta

Binomial name
- Xanthoparmelia arrecta (Essl.) O.Blanco, A.Crespo, Elix, D.Hawksw. & Lumbsch (2004)

Synonyms
- List: Neofuscelia arrecta Essl. (2000); Neofuscelia lapidula Essl. (2000); Xanthoparmelia lapidula (Essl.) O.Blanco, A.Crespo, Elix, D.Hawksw. & Lumbsch (2004); Neofuscelia mehalei Essl. (2000); Xanthoparmelia mehalei (Essl.) O.Blanco, A.Crespo, Elix, D.Hawksw. & Lumbsch (2004)

Species of lichen

Xanthoparmelia arrecta is a species of foliose lichen in the family Parmeliaceae. It is endemic to Namibia, where it grows in semi-arid environments.

== Taxonomy ==
It was first described by Theodore L. Esslinger in 2000, from samples collected in Namibia. The type specimen was collected in Namibia's Swakopmund Constituency. The holotype, designated as Hale 81089, was found on the eastern side of the Salt Road (D2301), just south of Wlotzkasbaken, approximately 37 km (23 mi) northwest of Swakopmund at an elevation of 20 m (66 ft). This specimen is housed at the United States National Herbarium (US). The species was initially classified in the genus Neofuscelia, a genus that has since been wrapped into Xanthoparmelia.

== Description ==
Xanthoparmelia arrecta has a foliose (leaf-like) thallus that is tightly attached to the surface it grows on, usually not exceeding 3 cm (1.2 in) in diameter. The thallus lobes are narrow, measuring 0.5–1.2 mm wide, and have a convex shape. The upper surface of the lobes is brown with a slightly yellowish tone towards the ends, becoming slightly wrinkled as it ages. Unlike many lichens, Xanthoparmelia arrecta does not have soredia or isidia, which are reproductive propagules. The lower surface is tan to pale brown, smooth, and features sparse, short rhizines (root-like structures). Chemical spot tests on the thallus show K−, and HNO_{3}+ (dark blue-green); on the medulla they are PD−, K−, C−, KC+ (dingy rose or rose-orange). Xanthoparmelia arrecta contains the secondary metabolite (lichen product) hypoprotocetraric acid.

== Habitat and distribution ==
This species is endemic to Namibia, where it was found in the Swakopmund Constituency, growing in semi-arid environments such as gravel flats and coastal regions.

== See also ==
- List of Xanthoparmelia species
