= Karibib Private School =

- Karibib; Namibia

Information
- Type: Private
- School district: Erongo Region
- Principal: Vincent Hockey
- Grades: Pre-Primary, Primary to 12
- Colors: Blue and Yellow
- Website: www.karibibps.com

Karibib Private School (KPS) is a private school in Karibib in the Erongo Region of central Namibia. It offers a hostel that caters for its learners from kindergarten to grade 12.

The school is divided into two phases, phase 1 and phase 2. Academically learners in phase 1 are only allowed to pass with 45% or more in their subjects and should not fail more than one subject. For the phase 2 learners to continue with grade 11, they need to have 30 points in their grade 10 exams.

== History ==
The first school in Karibib was established in 1902 by a missionary. In 1907 Deutsche Schule Karibib (DSK, German: German School Karibib, also: Privatschule Karibib) started to operate, first as a government school of Imperial Germany, and after World War I as a private school. When competition from other German schools eroded its pupil base, the school closed down in 1986. The campus is currently leased to the similarly named but unrelated Karibib Private School which sees itself as continuing the legacy of DSK.

== Performance ==
Karibib Private School was in the top 20 of the best performing High Schools in Namibia in 2013, up from rank 91 in the 2012 school year.

== See also ==
- Education in Namibia
- List of schools in Namibia
