= Three Aloes mine =

Tantalum mine in Namibia

- Location within Namibia
- Location: Dâures Constituency, Erongo Region, Namibia; 21.31667°S 14.89250°E
- Products: Tantalum
- Company: Central African Mining and Exploration Company

The Three Aloes mine is a large mine located in the western part of Namibia in Erongo Region. Three Aloes represents one of the largest tantalum reserves in Namibia, having estimated reserves of 13.2 million tonnes of ore grading 0.026% tantalum.

The mine lies 10 km (6.2 mi) south of Uis. As of 2002, it was the largest tantalite producer in Namibia. The mine is owned by the Central African Mining and Exploration Company through its subsidiary, Albaca Mining Company.

The mine may currently be dormant, but the situation is unclear.

== See also ==
- Uis mine
