= Norasa uranium project =

Uranium mine in Namibia

- Location within Namibia
- Location: Erongo Region, Namibia; 22.346345°S 15.235205°E
- Products: uranium
- Company: Forsys Metals

The Norasa uranium project comprises the Valencia and Namibplaas deposits in Erongo Region in the western part of Namibia. The two parts are 7 kilometres (4.3 mi) apart and both are fully owned by Forsys Metals. It represents one of the largest uranium resources in Namibia, having an estimated resource of 48,200 tU in ore grading 0.014-0.0167% uranium. The Valencia deposit was named after the farm where the uranium deposits were found.

If built, the mine was expected to produce 18 million tonnes of uranium a year over an 11-year period. The mine is developed by Forsys Metals.

== History ==
The Valencia deposit was discovered by Trekkopje Exploration in 1972. In 1994, a licence was granted to Tsumeb Corp. a subsidiary of Gold Fields. In 2004, the licence was transferred to Tsumeb Exploration Company, a subsidiary of Ongopolo Mining & Processing. In 2005, Tsumeb was acquired by Forsys Metals.

Preliminary environmental assessment for the mine was completed in the beginning of 2006. The pre-feasibility study was completed in May 2007. The environmental impact assessment and the environmental management plan were approved in June 2008. In August 2008, the mining licence was granted.

In 2013, the Valencia and the Namibplaas projects were consolidated as Norasa uranium project. At the same year, Forsys Metals laid off most of the workers of the mine due to the low uranium price. In 2014, it commenced the new feasibility study.

== Sale controversy ==
In 2008, it was announced that the project would be acquired by George Forrest International. The deal was cancelled in 2009. According to leaked diplomatic cables, the deal was interfered by the United States and Canadian authorities because of the fear that George Forrest will sell uranium to Iran if it obtained the mine.
