= Etango mine =

Uranium mine in Namibia

- Location: Erongo Region, Namibia
- Products: uranium
- Company: Bannerman Resources

The Etango mine is a proposed open pit mine located in the western part of Namibia in Erongo Region. Etango represents one of the largest uranium reserves in Namibia, having estimated reserves of 46,000 tonnes of Uranium in 455.7 million tonnes of ore grading 0.0165% uranium.
