= Reptile project =

- Location: Erongo Region, Namibia
- Products: uranium
- Company: Deep Yellow

The Reptile project is an exploratory development of uranium deposits in the Erongo Region of western of Namibia run by Deep Yellow Limited. It includes prospecting areas known as Tubas-Tumas and Tubas Red Sand. Tubas-Tumas has estimated reserves of 22.7 million tonnes of ore grading 0.03% uranium. Tubas Red Sand has estimated reserves of 90.8 million tonnes of ore grading 0.012% uranium.
