= Dawid van Lill =

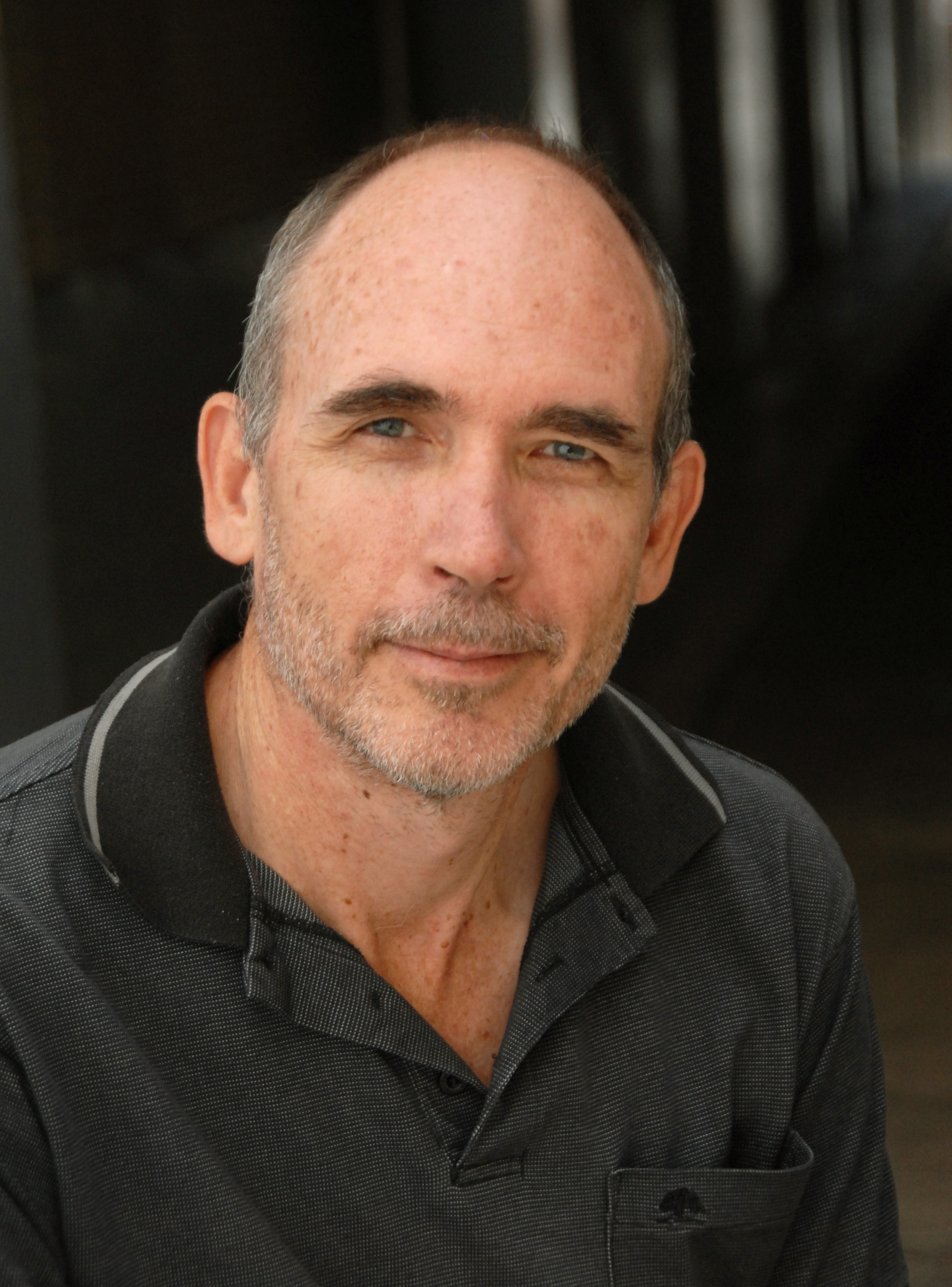
- Dawid van Lill, South African author.
- Born: 15 February 1957 (age 68) Omaruru, Namibia
- Occupation: Author, editor, translator
- Spouse: Marina
- Children: Dawie (33) and Wimpie (30)

Website
- www.dawidvanlill.com

Dawid Johannes van Lill (born 15 February 1957) is a writer, journalist, translator and editor, specialising in the creation of quiz programmes for radio, television, magazines and the Internet. He conceptualised, compiled and presented more than 2 000 episodes of radio quizzes, and compiled questions for a number of TV quizzes.

He contributed the sports section for the South African Encyclopaedia (for MWeb Learning), compiled questions for the previous South African version of Trivial Pursuit, and verified the questions and answers for five series of The Weakest Link. In 1984 and 1986 he was the winner of the popular TV quiz series Flinkdink and he is also the author of several books. Dawid is currently the CEO of Think Media, a quiz and trivia company.

== Life and career ==
Dawid van Lill was born in South-West Africa (Namibia) in 1957. He graduated from Stellenbosch University in 1984 with a master's degree in Theology. In 1984 and 1986 he was the winner of the popular TV quiz series Flinkdink. He joined the SABC in 1985, and became a well-known radio personality after his Flinkdink experience. From 1985 to 1997 he was a broadcaster at the SABC, where he created, compiled and presented quiz and trivia programmes for radio.

Dawid van Lill is currently a writer, journalist and broadcaster. He has specialised in the creation and presentation of general knowledge programmes and quiz shows for radio, TV, books, magazines and notable publications for 25 years.

In 1998 Dawid and his wife, Marina, founded Think Media, a research company. In 2000 and 2001, Think Media provided the questions and scripts for quiz programmes such as 100%, Blitsvinnig, and Vat 'n Kans! They also compiled questions for the M-Net sports quiz programme Going for Gold, as well as for two series of the SABC 3 quiz show Greed, e.tv's Mahala on e and he was a consultant and researcher for SABC2's Flinkdink and SABC3's Weakest Link. Think Media provided the questions for the M-Net quiz series Temptation and Are You Smarter than a 5th Grader? The writing of the Sports section of the South African Encyclopedia (which appeared on M-Web in April 2001) proved to be another major highlight.

Dawid also compiled general knowledge questions for a South African version of Trivial Pursuit. Other achievements include quiz and trivia books, as well as a number of books about Africa, including Amazing Africa, Amazing Animals of Southern Africa, Wonders of African and Man-made Wonders of Africa. His hobbies include reading, movies, travel, sport and general knowledge.

In 2000 Dawid and his wife, Marina, started a General Knowledge and News quiz programme for schools and the public, called I KNOW!

He also collects books on everything and anything that will enrich one's general knowledge repertoire. He also loves a good whodunit. One of his specialities is the collection of information and books on sports, especially rugby, cricket, athletics and tennis.

“Incurable curiosity is a thousand times better than terminal ignorance.”

=== Books ===
Title	Year	Publisher
Ontdek die Bybel (Larousse) Editor	1993	Daan Retief
Die Groot Familievasvraboek	1998	Human & Rousseau
The Big Family Quiz Book	1998	Human & Rousseau
Wat 'n Vraag!	2001	Human & Rousseau
Fassinerende Feite	2000	LAPA Publishers
Van Lill's South African Miscellany	2004	Zebra Press
Van Lill se Suid-Afrikaanse Trivia	2004	Zebra Press
Wonderlike Afrika	2004	LAPA Publishers
Amazing Africa	2007	LAPA Publishers
Van Lill's South African Sports Trivia	2005	Zebra Press
Wonderlike Diere	2005	LAPA Publishers
Amazing Animals	2007	LAPA Publishers
Wonders van Afrika	2006	LAPA Publishers
Wonders of Africa	2006	LAPA Publishers
African Wildlife Trivia	2008	Struik Publishers
Afrika se Natuur-trivia	2008	Struik Publishers
Manmade Wonders of Africa	2008	LAPA Publishers
Mensgemaakte Wonders van Afrika	2008	LAPA Publishers
Britannica Junior vir Suidelike Afrika (Editor)	2010	Jacklin Enterprises
Amazing Africa (New edition)	2010	LAPA Publishers
Wonderlike Afrika (New edition)	2010	LAPA Publishers

=== TV Quizzes ===
Compiled questions

No	Title	Station	Year	Episodes
1	100%	kykNET	2000	30
2	Blitsvinnig	kykNET	2000	26
3	Going for Gold	M-Net	2000	26
4	Greed	SABC3	2000	26
5	Mahala on e	e.tv	2001	20
6	Waag 'n kans	M-Net	2001	13
7	Flinkdink 1	SABC2	2003	13
8	Flinkdink 2	SABC2	2004	13
9	Flinkdink 3	SABC2	2005	13
10	Genius	SABC1	2004	26
11	Mega Minds	SABC1	2004	13
12	Whizz Quiz	SABC1	2004	13
13	Friday Face-Off	SABC1	2004	39
14	Test the Nation	SABC2	2005	01
15	Sho't Left	SABC2	2005	07
16	In die Kryt	kykNET	2005	08
17	Tweestryd	kykNET	2006	26
18	Beautiful Country	SABC2	2006	13
19	Om-i-Wêreld 1 & 2	kykNET	2006	52
20	Dlala Skhokho 1	SABC1	2006	26
21	Dlala Skhokho 2	SABC1	2007	26
22	Treasure Hunter	SABC3	2006	26
23	Temptation: SA	M-Net	2006	30
24	Temptation: Nigeria	M-Net	2006	26
25	Eish! I know! 1	SABC2	2007	13
26	Eish! I know! 2	SABC2	2008	13
27	Are you smarter than a 5th Grader?	M-Net	2008	13
28	SoccaGame	SABC1	2010	13
