= Karibib railway station =

Railway station in Namibia

Coordinates: 21°56′11″S 15°51′11″E

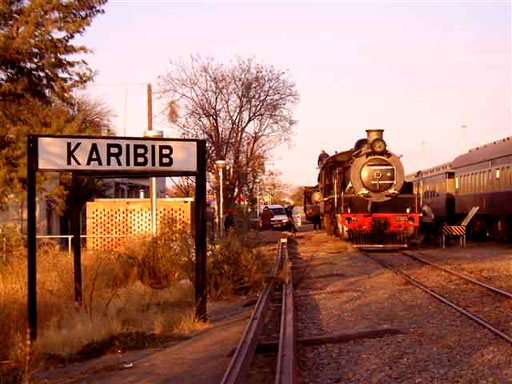
- Karibib railway station, 2006

General information
- System: Railway station
- Owner: TransNamib Railway

History
- Opened: 1902
Location

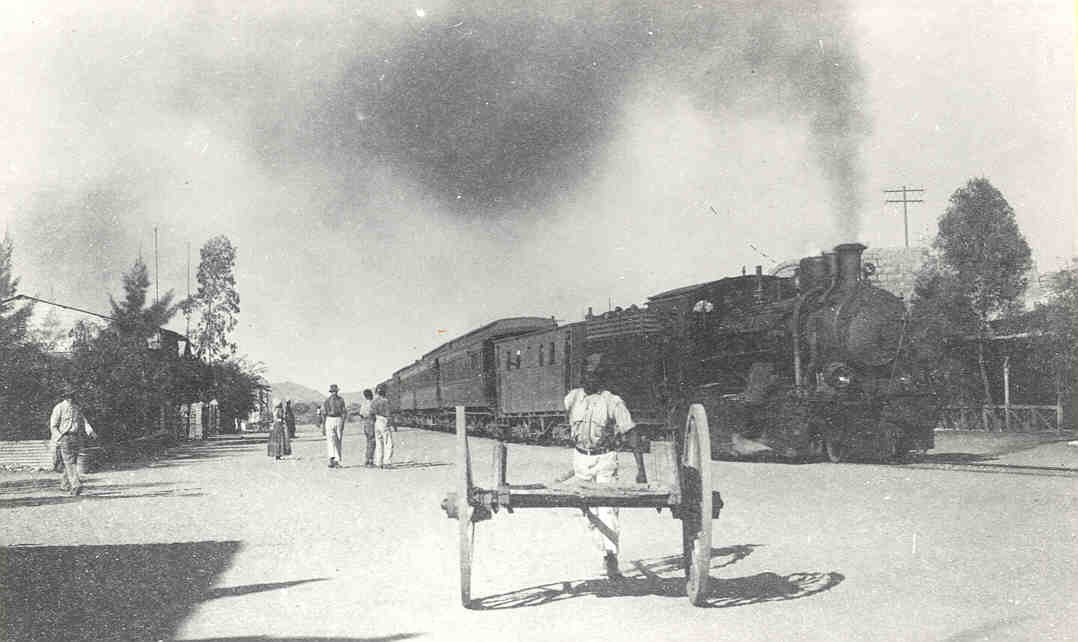
Karibib railway station, c. 1920

Karibib railway station is a railway station serving the town of Karibib in Namibia. It is part of the TransNamib Railway.

Karibib is situated on the Windhoek—Swakopmund line, built in 1902 during Imperial Germany's colonial rule of German South West Africa. In 1914 this line was extended to Walvis Bay.

Karibib is connected to a number of towns in the north of Namibia via the railway junction at Kranzberg, 15 kilometres (9.3 mi) west of town, and to the south and east of Namibia via Windhoek.

== See also ==
- Rail transport in Namibia
