= Natalia ǀGoagoses =

Namibian politician (born 1962)

Governor of Erongo Region
- Incumbent
- Assumed office 1 July 2025
- President: Netumbo Nandi-Ndaitwah
- Prime Minister: Elijah Ngurare
- Preceded by: Neville Andre Itope

Deputy Minister of Higher Education, Training and Innovation
- In office 12 September 2023 – 21 March 2025
- President: Hage Geingob; Nangolo Mbumba
- Prime Minister: Saara Kuugongelwa-Amadhila
- Preceded by: Veno Kauaria
- Succeeded by: Position abolished

Deputy Minister of Urban and Rural Development
- In office 21 April 2021 – 12 September 2023
- Preceded by: Derek Klazen
- Succeeded by: Eveline !Nawases-Tayele

Personal details
- Born: 21 January 1962 (age 64) Outjo, South West Africa (now Namibia)
- Occupation: Politician

Natalia ǀGoagoses (born 21 January 1962) is a Namibian politician and the current Governor of Erongo Region. She has been a member of the National Assembly for SWAPO since 2020. In April 2021 ǀGoagoses was appointed deputy Minister of Urban and Rural Development, and in September 2023 she was moved to the Minister of Higher Education, Training and Innovation, again as deputy minister.

== Biography ==
ǀGoagoses was born in Outjo on 21 January 1962. She holds a Bachelor of Education (B. Ed.) and a Master of Education (M. Ed.). She has worked as a teacher, education inspector, education director and, from 2013, head of the Erongo Regional Council. In January 2020, she was appointed Deputy Chair of the Council for National Heritage.

In March 2020, President Hage Geingob appointed ǀGoagoses as a non-voting member of the National Assembly. On 21 April 2021, she was appointed deputy minister in the Ministry of Urban and Rural Development when her predecessor Derek Klazen moved to the Fisheries Ministry as minister. On 12 September 2023, in a cabinet reshuffle, ǀGoagoses was appointed Deputy Minister of Higher Education, Training and Innovation.

The Minister of Higher Education was dissolved when president Netumbo Nandi-Ndaitwah took office in March 2025. On 1 July 2025, ǀGoagoses was appointed Governor of Erongo Region.
