= Karibib Constituency =

Electoral constituency in Erongo region, Namibia

Karibib constituency (red) in the Erongo Region

Karibib constituency is a constituency in the Erongo Region of Namibia. It had a population of 13,320 in 2011, an increase from 12,084 in 2001. Karibib constituency covers 14,535.8 km^{2} (5,612.3 sq mi) of land. The district capital is the town of Karibib. Smaller settlements that belong to Karibib constituency are Otjimbingwe, Usakos, and Wilhelmstal. As of 2020 the constituency had 9,617 registered voters.

== Politics ==
In the 2004 regional election, South West Africa People's Organization (SWAPO) candidate Ussiel Paulus Xoagub received 1,874 of the 4,072 votes cast and became councillor. In the 2010 regional elections, councillor Xoagub (SWAPO) was re-elected. He received 1,498 votes, defeating Zedekias Tsamaseb of the United Democratic Front (UDF, 1,313 votes) and Manfriedt Weskop of the Rally for Democracy and Progress (RDP, 458 votes).

The 2015 regional elections were won by Melania Ndjago of SWAPO with 1,902 votes. Tsamaseb of UDF came second with 1,212 votes while Christiaan Nguherimo of the RDP received 217 votes. Ndjago was narrowly reelected in the 2020 regional election, winning the constituency with 1,296 votes. UDF was again runner-up, its candidate Ernestus Axakhoeb received 1,172 votes. In third place was Rudolf Kahingunga from the Independent Patriots for Change (IPC, an opposition party formed in August 2020). He obtained 529 votes.
