= Navachab Gold Mine =

Gold mine in Namibia

Navachab
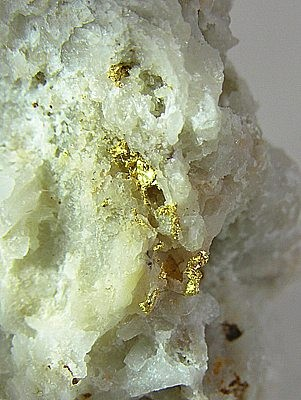
- Gold quartz from the Navachab Gold Mine.

- Location in Namibia
- Location: Karibib, Erongo, Namibia; 21°58′20″S 015°46′24″E
- Company: QKR
- Website: QKR website
- Acquired: 2014

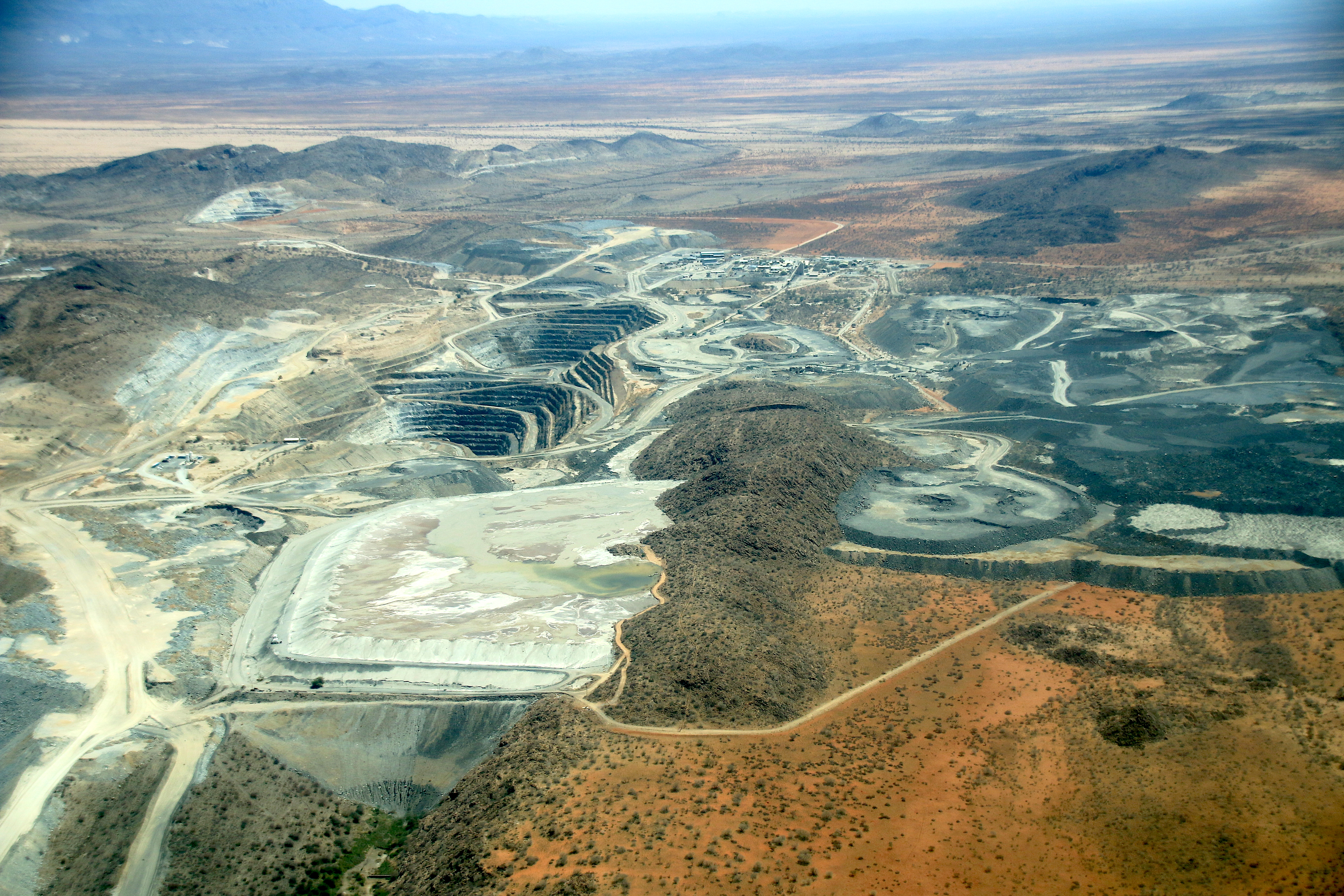
Aerial view of Navachab Gold Mine

The Navachab Gold Mine is an open-pit gold mine situated near Karibib, in the Erongo Region of Namibia. The operation is owned by QKR.

Navachab, the oldest gold mine in Namibia, takes its name from the local Navachab farm, where the gold deposit was found. The deposit is located 6 km south of the Okahandja-Swakopmund road.

== History ==
The first gold discoveries in Namibia were made in 1899. Gold mining began in the country in 1933, but was later abandoned because of low grades.

The Navachab gold deposit was discovered in October 1984 as a result of an exploration programme conducted. An appraisal was carried out in 1986, followed by a feasibility study in 1987, which determined to proceed with the development of the mine. Construction work at the site began in 1988 and was completed within 21 months. Production started at Navachab in 1989, pouring its first gold bar in December 1989. Originally jointly owned by the Erongo Exploration and Mining Company (70%), the Metal Mining Company of Canada (20%) and Rand Mines Exploration, AngloGold acquired a 70% interest in the mine in 1998, which it increased to a 100% the following year. In 2004, AngloGold and Ashanti merged to form AngloGold Ashanti.

The mine is no longer the only gold mine in Namibia. In 2003, AngloGold made the decision to switch to owner-mining instead of using contractors. The decision was made after the life of the mine could be extended considerably. It was later claimed by some former contract employees that they had been promised permanent jobs with AngloGold after the switch but had not received them. In 2009, the mine employed 578 people, all of which were permanent employees.

For the first time since the start of operations at Navachab, the mine experienced a fatal accident on 2 June 2009 when a drill-rig operator was fatally injured.

Navachab was acquired by QKR from AngloGold Ashanti in June 2014. QKR is owned mostly by the Qatar Investment Authority's Qatar Holding LLC and Kulczyk Investments.

== Production ==
Production figures of the recent past were:

Year	Production	Grade	Cost per ounce
2003	73,000 ounces	1.75 g/t	US$ 274
2004	67,000 ounces	1.59 g/t	US$ 348
2005	81,000 ounces	2.05 g/t	US$ 381
2006	86,000 ounces	1.81 g/t	US$ 265
2007	80,000 ounces	1.56 g/t	US$ 419
2008	68,000 ounces	1.43 g/t	US$ 534
2009	65,000 ounces	1.58 g/t	US$ 622
2010			
