= Forsys Metals =

Canadian mining company

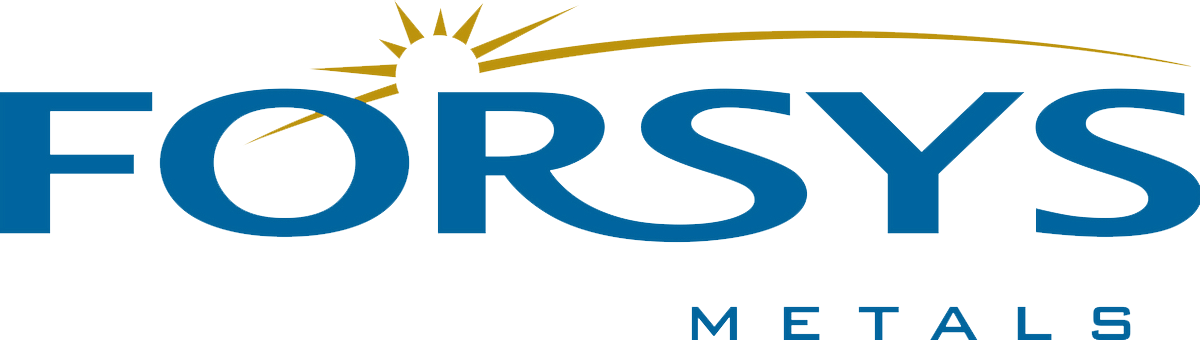
- Company type: Public
- Traded as: TSX: FSY; NSX: FSY
- Industry: Mineral exploration
- Founded: 2004 (listed)
- Headquarters: Toronto, Canada
- Website: forsysmetals.com

Forsys Metals is a Canadian mining company with gold and uranium operations in Namibia, particularly the Norasa uranium project. As of November 2011 the company had market capitalization of about CDN$55 million.

Forsys was listed on the Toronto Venture Exchange in September 2004, and moved up to the Toronto Stock Exchange in October 2006. In July 2005 Forsys acquired a 90% interest in the Valencia uranium deposit in Namibia and in March 2007 raised its position to 100% ownership. Based on prospecting on the property, Forsys filed a technical report estimating Valencia reserves in June 2007. After clearing environmental requirements, in August 2008 the Namibian government granted Forsys a 25-year mining licence for Valencia.

In November 2008 George Arthur Forrest attempted to buy Forsys Metals through a subsidiary of his Forrest Group, offering CDN$579m. The company's management supported the offer. The deal foundered in September 2009. Forrest had not been able to find financial backers that would be acceptable to the Canadian Federal government. There was speculation that Forrest had looked for funding to South Korea, or possibly Iran or North Korea. In January 2011 Wikileaks released U.S. diplomatic cables that said Washington and Ottawa were concerned that Forrest might sell the uranium to Iran, which was looking for nuclear fuel, and therefore blocked the deal.

In July 2009 Forsys started exploratory drilling for uranium at the 70% owned Namibplaas permit, 7 kilometres (4.3 mi) from the Valencia project. In August 2010 Forsys finalized an agreement through which Angus Mining (Namibia), another Canadian company, would explore for gold at Forsys's wholly owned Ondundu Project. In November 2011 Forsys reported a net loss of $971,000 in the third quarter, much the same as the previous year. The company had almost $5 million in working capital. It was acquiring the remaining 30% of the Namibplaas property by issuing new shares and purchase warrants.
