= Uis mine =

Mine in Namibia

- Location in Namibia
- Location: Dâures Constituency, Erongo Region, Namibia; 21°13′00″S 14°52′52″E
- Products: Tin, Lithium, Tantalum
- Company: Andrada Mining
- Website: andradamining.com

The Uis tin mine is a large open pit mine located in the western part of Namibia in Erongo Region. Uis represents one of the largest tin reserves in Namibia, having estimated reserves of 60 million tonnes of ore grading 0.13% tin. The mine is owned by the London-based AfriTin Mining Ltd..

As of January 2023, AfriTin Mining Ltd rebranded to Andrada Mining Ltd with an expanding tech-minerals portfolio adding lithium and tantalum to its current tin production.
