= Omaruru, Namibia =

City in Erongo Region, Namibia

Omaruru
- City
- Coat of arms
- Motto(s): Belief and Courage
- Location in Namibia
- Coordinates: 21°26′S 15°56′E
- Country: Namibia
- Region: Erongo Region
- Constituency: Omaruru Constituency
- Established: 1863

Area
  - Total: 74 sq mi (192 km^{2})

Population (2023 census)
  - Total: 10,767
  - Density: 145/sq mi (56.1/km^{2})
- Time zone: UTC+2 (South African Standard Time)
- Climate: BWh

Omaruru is a city in the Erongo Region of central Namibia. It had 10,767 inhabitants in 2023 and encompasses 352 square kilometres (136 sq mi) of land.

Omaruru is known for its annual festival where the Herero people commemorate their past local chiefs, its winery, and for the dinosaur footprints at nearby Otjihaenamparero.

== Geography ==
Omaruru is situated near Mount Erongo, on the usually dry Omaruru River. It is connected via the paved C33 regional road to Karibib and the Atlantic coast in the south, and to Otjiwarongo in the north east.

Historical population
Year	Pop.	±% p.a.
2001	4,761	—
2011	6,300	+2.84%
2023	10,767	+4.57%

== History ==
The name Omaruru in the Otjiherero language means 'bitter milk', as Herero cattle herds used to graze on the local bush that turned their milk bitter.

Omaruru was established in 1863 by Wilhelm Zeraua, the first chief of the White Flag clan of the OvaHerero people. In 1871, Anders Ohlsson and Axel Eriksson established a brewery at Omaruru. Eriksson had also established a trading post, which flourished and by 1878 he employed about forty whites. Eriksson's business was based upon long-distance trading between southern Angola and the Cape Colony, which necessitated the establishment of regional trade routes.

The town grew around a mission built in 1872 by Gottlieb Viehe, now a museum, and was attacked in 1904 during the Herero Wars. Franke Tower was later erected to commemorate the relief by Hauptmann Victor Franke's troops of the local Schutztruppe garrison - which had been under siege by the Herero people, who had risen against rule by the German colonial empire.

=== Dutch Reformed Church ===
Omaruru Reformed Church, the local congregation of the Dutch Reformed Church in South Africa (NGK) was separated from that in Otjiwarongo on March 1, 1941, and included Omaruru, Karibib, Usakos, Kalkfeld, Swakopmund, and Walvis Bay as ward centers. Over the years, six congregations were in turn spun off from the Omaruru one, but the overall numbers were usually sparse given the predominantly ethnic German demographics of the local white population. At its founding, the congregation covered an area of approximately 400 kilometres (250 mi), both north to south and east to west.

=== Legacy of von Trotha ===
The descendants of Lothar von Trotha and the von Trotha family travelled to Omaruru in October 2007 by invitation of the royal Herero chiefs and publicly apologised for his role in the Herero genocide. Member of the family Wolf-Thilo von Trotha: "We, the von Trotha family, are deeply ashamed of the terrible events that took place 100 years ago. Human rights were grossly abused that time".

== Politics ==
Omaruru is governed by a municipal council that currently has seven seats. It is the district capital of the Omaruru Constituency. Omaruru is one of few Namibian towns where the political opposition is relatively strong.

The first local election run after Namibian independence, the 1992 local elections, was won by SWAPO which obtained 961 votes and gained four seats. The Democratic Turnhalle Alliance (DTA) came second with 668 votes and three seats. The 1998 local authority elections saw a very narrow result. The United Democratic Front (UDF) won and gained two seats (326 votes). SWAPO and DTA also gained two seats each with 310 and 280 votes, respectively. The remaining seat went to the local Omaruru Residents Association (106 votes).

SWAPO won the 2010 local authority election with 847 votes, followed by the Rally for Democracy and Progress (RDP) with 369 votes, the UDF with 308 votes, and National Unity Democratic Organisation (NUDO) with 107 votes. SWAPO also was the strongest party in the 2015 local authority elections, winning four seats in the town council and gaining 1117 votes. The UDF gained two seats (590 votes), and the DTA obtained one (291 votes).

In the 2020 local authority election SWAPO won again over each individual opposition party but lost the majority of seats in the city council. SWAPO obtained 642 votes and gained two seats. One seat each went to the Popular Democratic Movement (PDM, the new name of the DTA since 2017) with 403 votes, the Independent Patriots for Change (IPC, newly formed in August 2020) with 305 votes, the local Omaruru Community Development Organisation with 297 votes, the UDF with 230 votes, and NUDO with 182 votes.

== Economy and infrastructure ==
Omaruru is the only Namibian town not connected to the NamWater pipeline network. It receives its water from boreholes along the Omaruru River which are managed by the municipality.

Omaruru Railway Station connects the town to the Trans-Namib railway network.

The Omaruru Correctional Facility is the smallest of Namibia's seven major prisons.

== Notable people ==
- Prince ǃGaoseb (born 1998), rugby union player for the Tel Aviv Heat
- Dawid van Lill (born 1957), writer, journalist, translator and editor
