= Omaruru Constituency =

Electoral constituency in Namibia

Omaruru constituency (red) in the Erongo Region

Omaruru is a constituency in the Erongo Region of central-eastern Namibia. Its district capital is the city of Omaruru. It had a population of 8,577 in 2011, up from 7,156 in 2001. Omaruru constituency covers 8,431.9 km^{2} (3,255.6 sq mi) of land. As of 2020 the constituency had 6,672 registered voters.

== Politics ==
In the 2004 regional election, Omaruru was one of only a few constituencies of Namibia that were won by the opposition. United Democratic Front (UDF) politician Stephanus Evaristo Shangombe received 1,010 of the 2,569 votes cast and became councillor. In the 2010 regional elections, SWAPO's Uparura Michael Tjirare won the constituency with 1,102 votes. The defeated challengers were Josef Landuleni Nangolo of the Rally for Democracy and Progress (RDP, 570 votes), Lisken Noabes of the UDF, 398 votes, and John Tjiuongua of the Congress of Democrats (CoD, 96 votes).

The 2015 regional elections were won by Johannes Tuhafeni Hamutenya of SWAPO with 1,420 votes. Christiaan Nanuseb of UDF came second with 678 votes, Sanna Sofia Paulus of the Democratic Turnhalle Alliance (DTA) received 348 votes, and Vincent Isboset Kahua of National Unity Democratic Organisation (NUDO) received 282. The 2020 regional election were again won by the SWAPO candidate. Erenst Manfred Wetha became constituency councillor with 895 votes. Roger Nautoro of the Popular Democratic Movement (PDM, the new name of the DTA) came second with 819 votes, followed by Christiaan Kazuvire of the Independent Patriots for Change (IPC, an opposition party formed in August 2020, 419 votes), Shighongo Sigberth Mangundu (an independent candidate, 355 votes), and NUDO's Kahua with 251 votes.
