= Swakopmund Constituency =

Electoral constituency in Erongo region, Namibia

Coordinates: 22°40′38.57″S 14°31′40.35″E

Swakopmund constituency (red) in the Erongo Region

Swakopmund constituency is a constituency in the Erongo Region of Namibia. The constituency had a population of 44,725 in 2011, up from 26,310 in 2001. It covers 196.3 square kilometres (75.8 sq mi) of land. Its district capital is the city of Swakopmund. As of 2020 the constituency had 35,668 registered voters.

== Politics ==
Swakopmund is traditionally a stronghold of the South West Africa People's Organization (SWAPO) party. In the 2004 regional election, SWAPO candidate Samuel Nuuyoma received 5,832 of the 9,176 votes cast and became councillor. In the 2010 regional elections, SWAPO's Germina Shitaleni won the constituency with 5,132 votes. Her only challenger was Esegiel Guiseb of the Rally for Democracy and Progress (RDP), who received 2,540 votes. The 2015 regional elections were also won by the SWAPO candidate. Juuso Kambueshe obtained 6,121 votes. Christa Magrietha Hochobeb of the Democratic Turnhalle Alliance (DTA) came second with 2,237 votes, and Rossie Lucia Ramakhutua of the RDP came third with 774 votes.

The 2020 regional election was won by Ciske Howard-Smith of the Independent Patriots for Change (IPC, an opposition party formed in August 2020). She obtained 5,688 votes. The SWAPO candidate, Phillipus Munenguni, came second with 3,260 votes. Howard-Smith subsequently was elected chairperson of the Erongo Regional Council. After Howard-Smith was expelled from the IPC in May 2022, a by-election was held in August. The IPC candidate again won. Ndaninga Kativa obtained 3,625 votes, followed by SWAPO's Salomon Ndara Nehemiah with 3,122 votes and Hilaria Tangeni Musheko of the Landless People's Movement (LPM) with 1,362 votes.
