= Karibib =

Karibib Otjiherero: Otjandjomboimwe
- Town
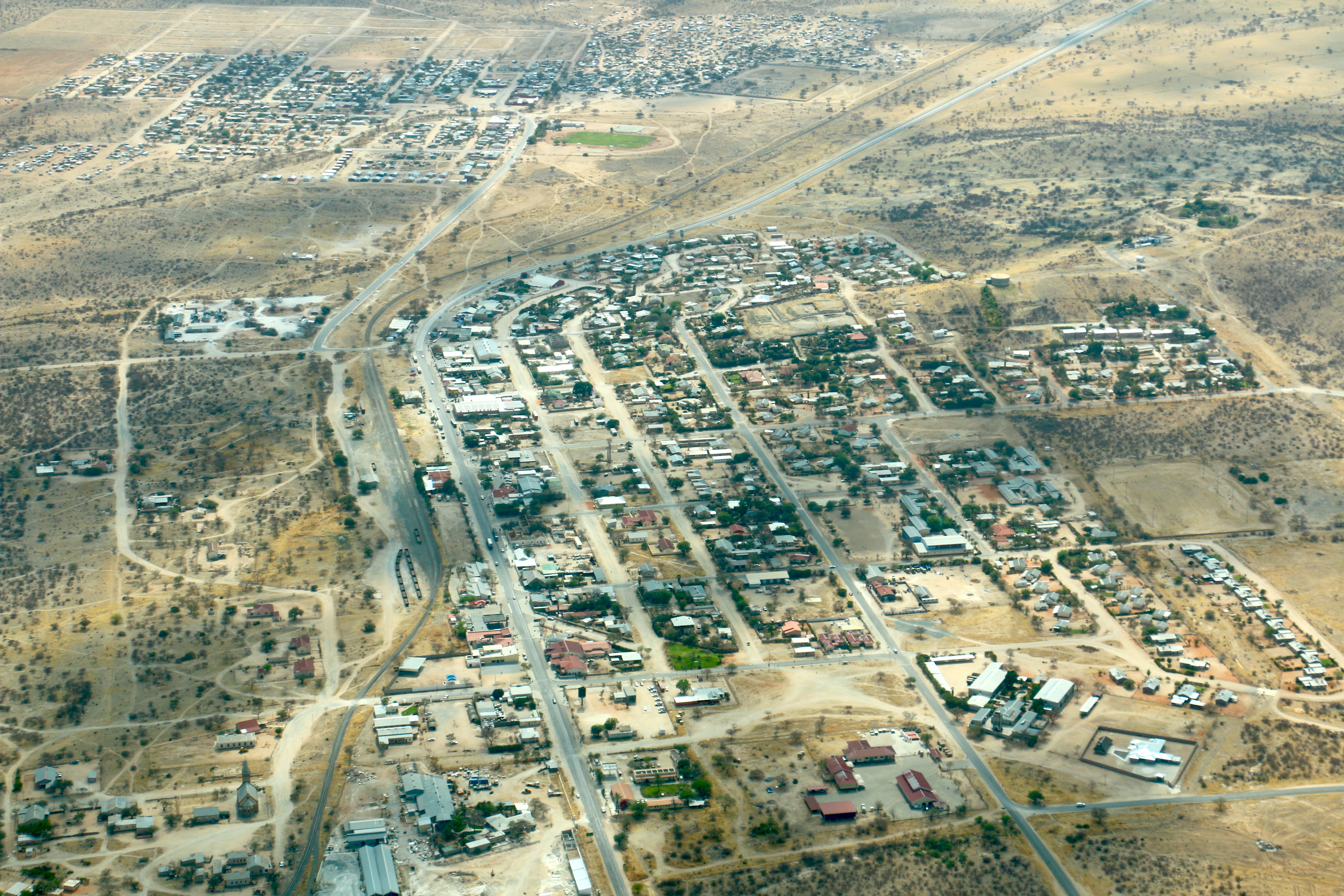
- Karibib aerial view 2017
- Interactive map of Karibib
- Location in Namibia
- Coordinates: 21°56′17″S 15°51′16″E
- Country: Namibia
- Region: Erongo Region
- Constituency: Karibib Constituency
- Founded: 1900

Government
  - Mayor: Dawid Iipinge

Population (2023)
  - Total: 8,434
- Time zone: UTC+2 (South African Standard Time)
- Climate: BWh

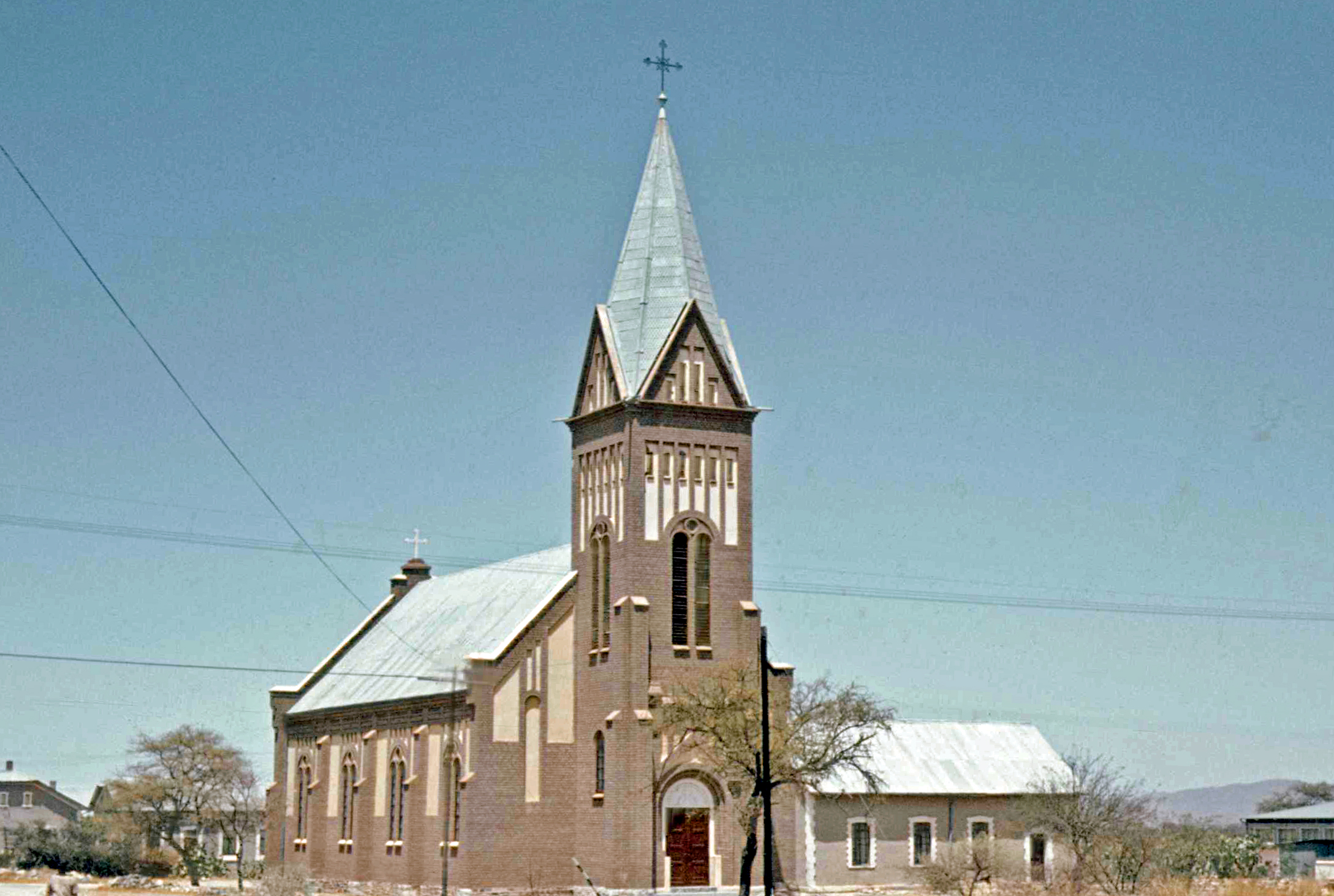
Christ Church, erected 1909/10

Karibib (Otjiherero: Otjandjomboimwe) is a town in the Erongo Region of western Namibia. It has 8,434 inhabitants. Karibib is the district capital of the Karibib electoral constituency. It is situated on the Khan River, halfway between Windhoek and Swakopmund on the B2 (Trans-Kalahari Highway), the main road between Walvis Bay and Johannesburg. The town is known for its aragonite marble quarries and the Navachab Gold Mine.

== Geography ==
Karibib comprises 97 square kilometres (37 sq mi) of town land.

Historical population
Year	Pop.	±% p.a.
2001	3,726	—
2011	5,132	+3.25%
2023	8,434	+4.23%

== Economy and Infrastructure ==
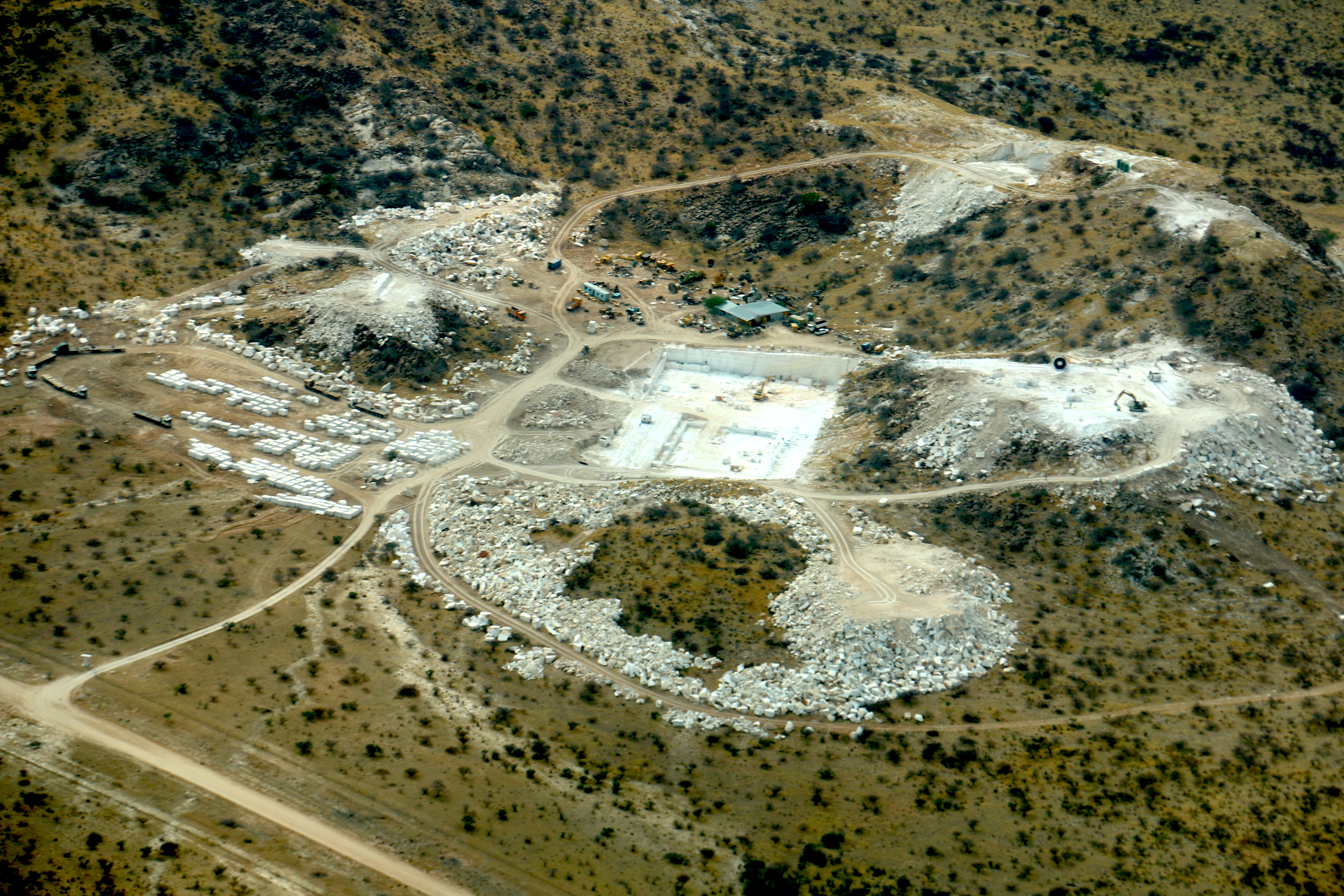
Marble quarry Karibib (2017) 21°51′37″S 015°57′17″E

The Navachab Gold Mine owned by QKR Namibia is located 10 km from Karibib town. The mine is the major tax payer, employer and property owner of the town, providing more than 750 jobs and owning 240 residential properties. In 2008, proposals surfaced for a new cement works.

Karibib is home to the Usab Stadium. and there is a golf course at the Klippenberg Country Club.

=== Transport ===
Karibib is situated on the B2 national road (Walvis Bay–Okahandja) close to the branch-off of the C33 to Otjiwarongo. About 1,000 trucks per day pass the town.

Karibib is connected to the TransNamib railway network; Karibib Railway Station is situated downtown. The next station to the west is Kranzberg, the junction for the branch railways to Tsumeb and Grootfontein from the line to the capital Windhoek.

North of the town is the location of the headquarters of the Namibian Air Force at the Karibib Air Base, housing the Command of the Air Force. The air base has a 2,600 metres (8,500 ft) asphalt runway, parallel paved taxiways and apron. The history of Karibib Airport goes back to pre-independence when it was used by the South African Air Force.

== History ==
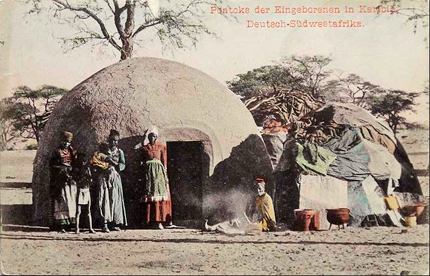
Karibib, Pontok – traditional house, at the end of the 19th century

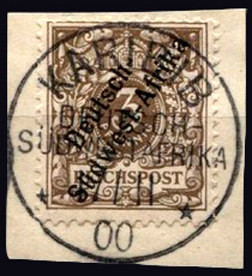
Stamps for German South West Africa postmarked Karibib 1900

Originally Karibib was a waterhole known to the Herero under the name Otjandjomboimwe. Expecting business opportunities arising from the railway construction between Swakopmund and Windhoek, Eduard Hälbich, merchant at Otjimbingwe, bought the waterhole and 20,000 hectares of land surrounding it from Herero headman Zacharias Zeraua. The deal was finalised on 7 January 1895, the purchase price was 22,500 marks (ℳ), two ox wagons, and 742 pounds 5 shillings that Zeraua had incurred in debts in Hälbich's shop in Otjimbingwe.

Karibib began to grow quickly when on 30 May 1900 the railway construction reached the newly founded place. 1 June 1900 marks the day of the official foundation of Karibib at the occasion of the first train arriving from Swakopmund. The railway station was built, a medical practice, storage facilities, a prison, and living quarters were erected, and the population rose to 274. This development disadvantaged the settlement of Otjimbingwe; ox wagons that before would travel via Otjimbingwe on the Alter Baiweg (Old bay path) would now take the route through Karibib.

In 1904 the place once again became important as a railway hub for ferrying troops in the Herero and Namaqua War. Its status was upgraded to that of a county, and governance was extended to include Omaruru. At the end of the war in 1907, Karibib counted 316 white residents, and the remaining Herero land was expropriated and offered to white farmers. Karibib was declared a municipality in 1909, and Eduard Hälbich was its mayor.

=== Historic Buildings ===
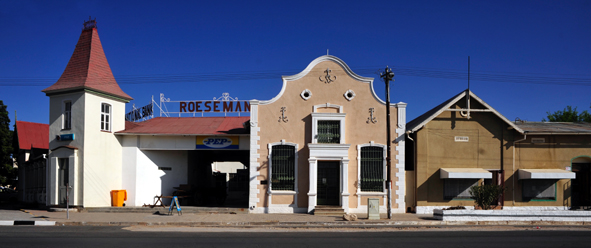
Roesemann Building (1900), one of Karibib's first structures

One of Karibib's oldest buildings is the Roesemannhaus / Roesemann's house, erected in 1900 shortly after the town was founded. Other historic structures are the Wollhaus / Wool house (1900) erected from local marble, the Railway station building (1901), the Kaiserbrunnen / Emperor fountain (1906-1908) and the Christ Church (1910).

== Politics ==
The first local election run after Namibian independence, the 1992 local elections, was won by SWAPO which obtained 919 votes and gained four seats. The United Democratic Front (UDF) came second with 303 votes and two seats. The remaining seat went to the Democratic Turnhalle Alliance (DTA, 222 votes). The 1998 local authority elections saw a similar result. SWAPO won with 460 votes, gaining five seats. One seat each went to the UDF (151 votes) and the DTA (96 votes).

Karibib was downgraded from municipal to town status in 2010. It is since then governed by a town council that has seven seats. In the 2010 local authority election a total of 990 votes were cast. SWAPO won with approximately 60% of the vote. Of the three other parties seeking votes in the election, the UDF received approximately 31% of the vote, followed by Rally for Democracy and Progress (RDP, the new name of the DTA, 9%) and the Congress of Democrats, which, despite being on the ballot, did not receive a vote. SWAPO also won the 2015 local authority elections, gaining 4 seats (653 votes). 2 seats went to the UDF (223 votes), and the remaining seat was won by the local Karibib Residents Association (KRA) that gained 128 votes.

In the 2020 local authority election SWAPO won again by a large margin but lost the majority of seats in the town council. SWAPO obtained 461 votes and gained three seats. One seat each went to the UDF (175 votes), the Independent Patriots for Change (IPC, newly formed in August 2020, 94 votes), the Landless People's Movement (LPM, registered in 2018, 80 votes) and the KRA (68 votes).

== Education ==
Schooling in Karibib started as a private missionary enterprise in 1902. From 1907 the Deutsche Schule Karibib (German: German School Karibib, also: Privatschule Karibib) operated in town, first as a government school of Imperial Germany, and after World War I as private school supported by German government. In 1965 it had 13 teachers and 53 learners. When competition from other German schools eroded its pupil base, the school closed down in 1986. The campus is currently leased to the similarly named but unrelated Karibib Private School.

Karibib is also home to Karibib Junior Secondary School and Ebenhaeser Primary School, situated in the Usab Location. Karibib Junior Secondary School emerged from Ebenhaeser Primary School when the latter started offering classes beyond grade 7. The Navachab gold mine in Karibib has played a major role in developing the school. Karibib Junior Secondary School is situated in town and offers grade 8 to Grade 10.
