= Erongo Region =

- Region
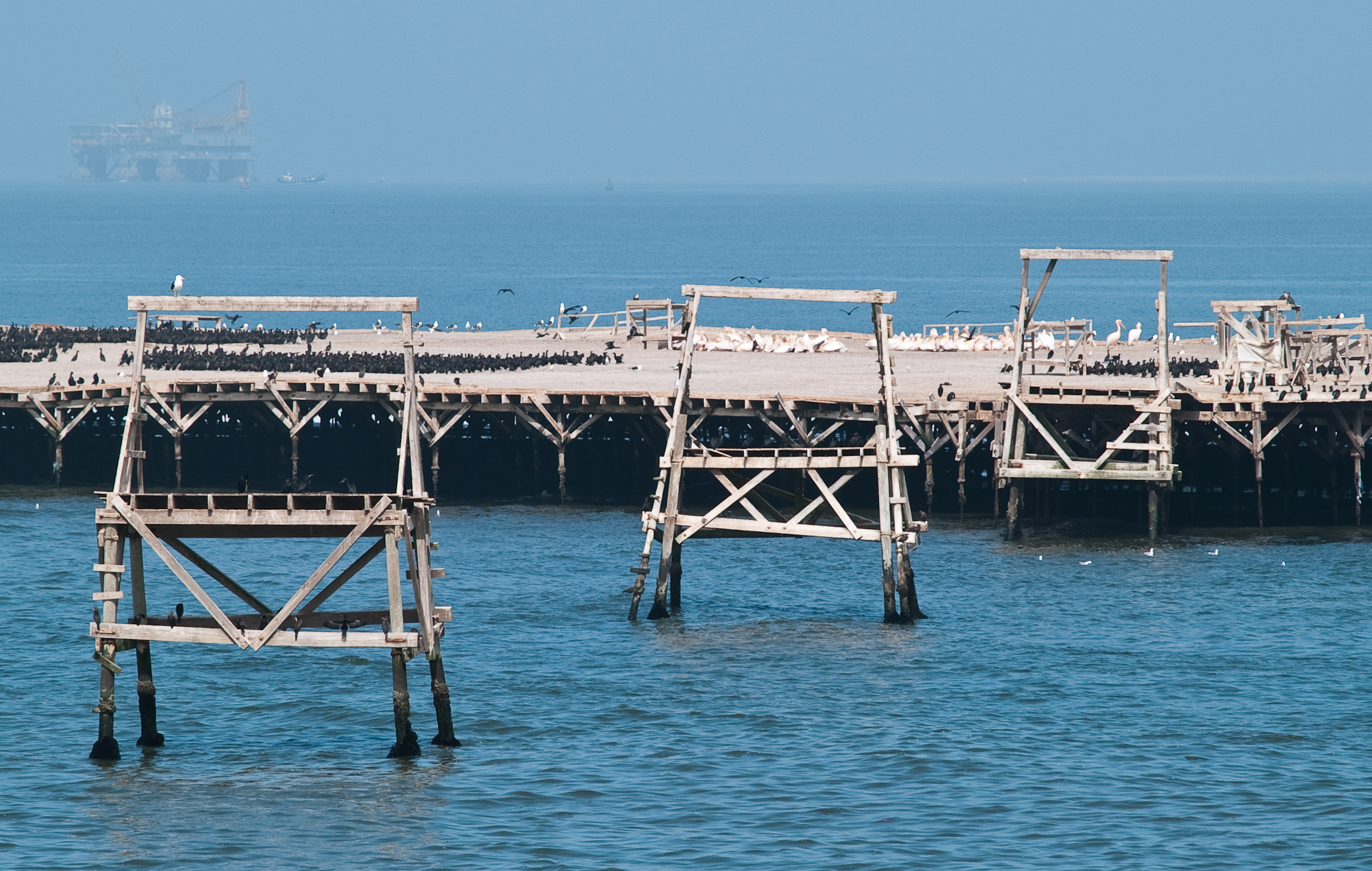
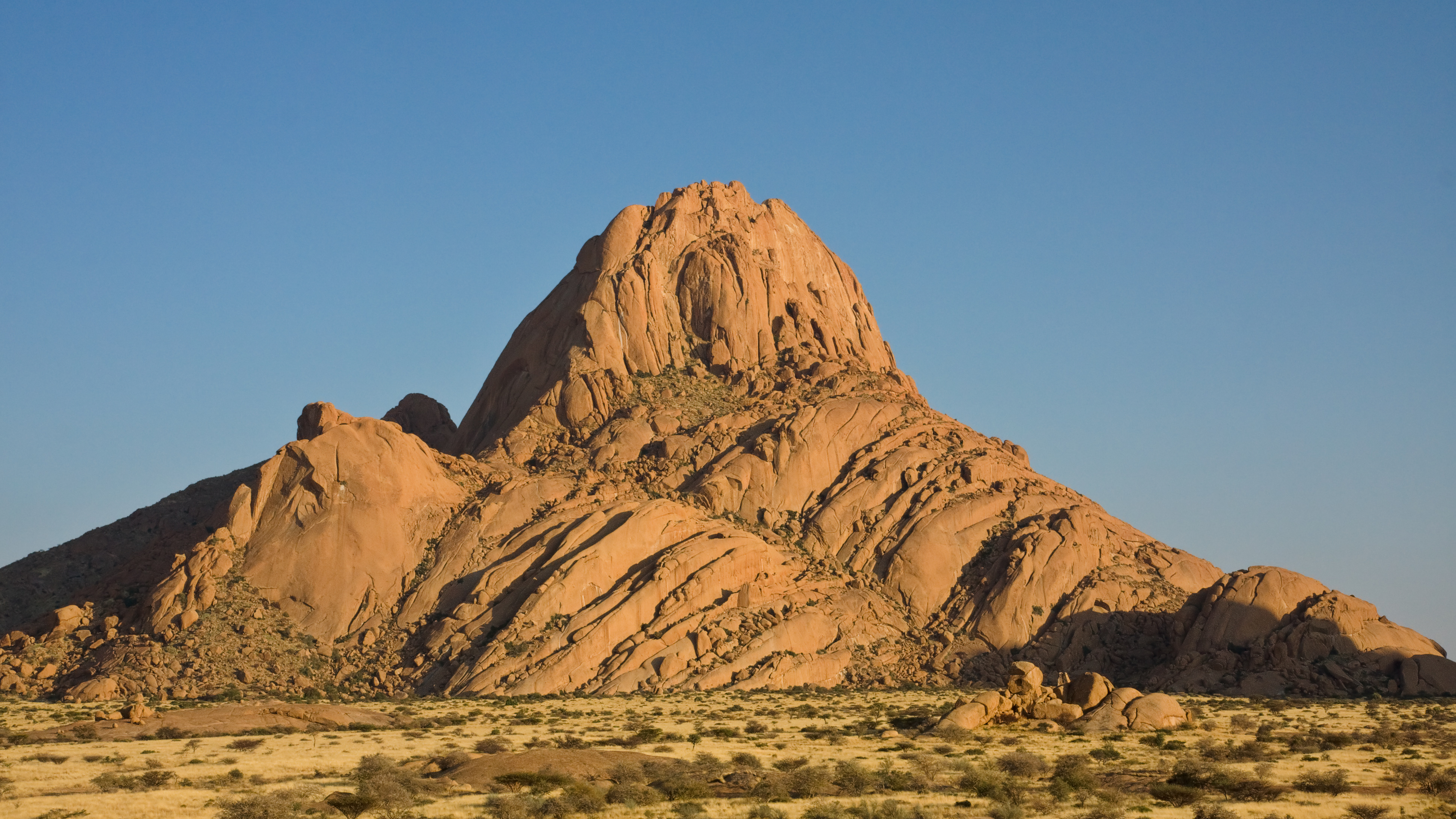
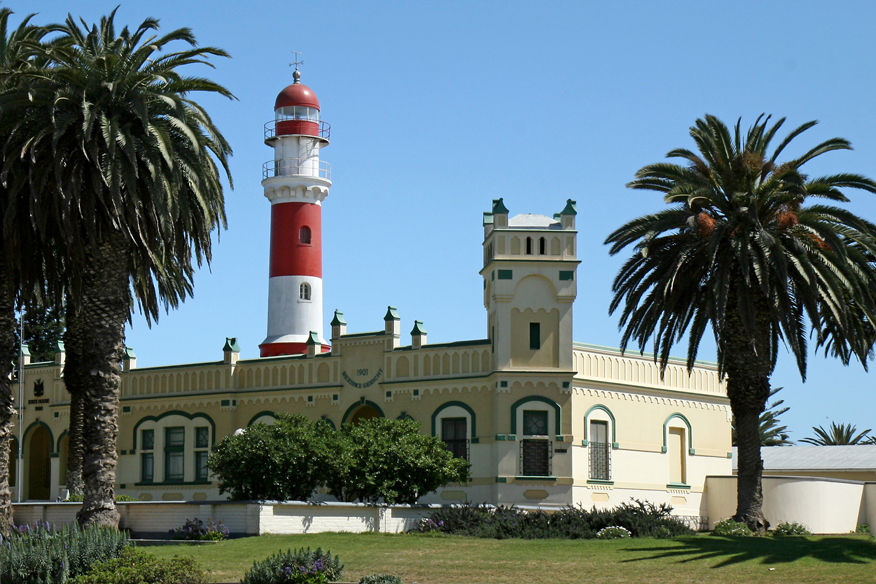
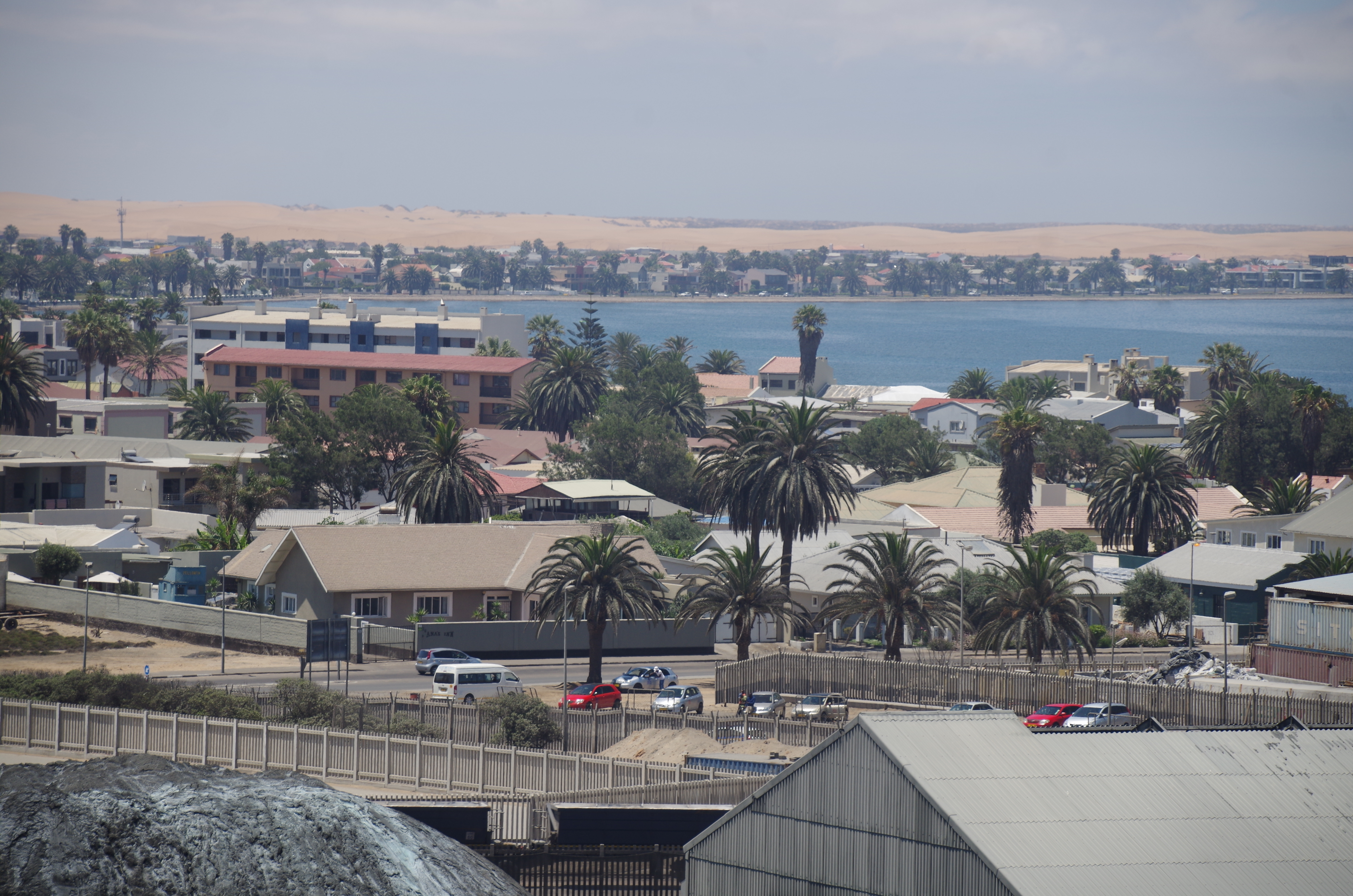
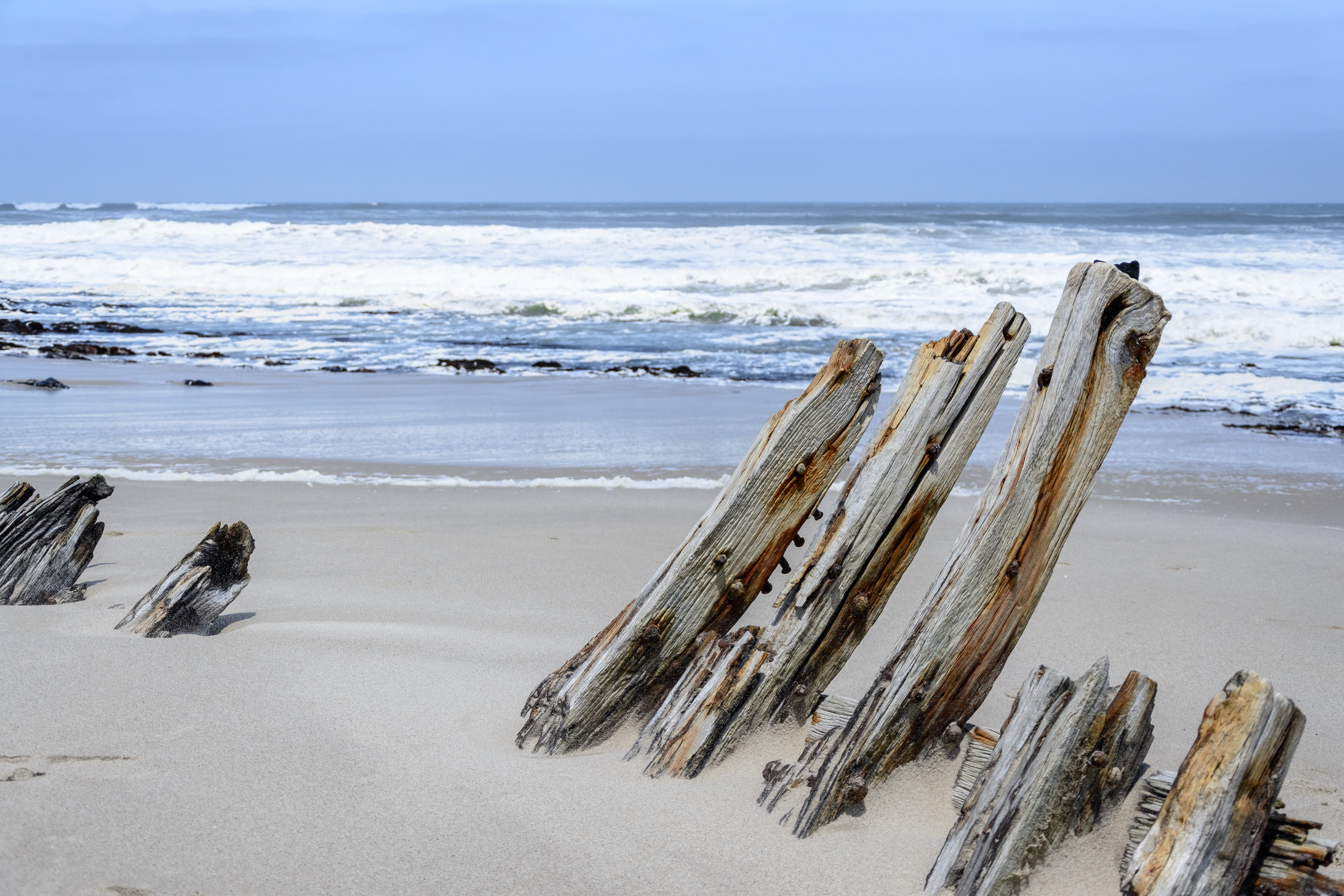
- From top, left to right: Bird Island, Spitzkoppe, State House in Swakopmund, View over Walvis Bay, Skeleton Coast.

- Location of the Erongo Region in Namibia
- Coordinates: 22.00°S 15.59°E
- Country: Namibia
- Capital: Swakopmund

Government
  - Governor: Natalia ǀGoagoses

Area
  - Total: 63,539 km^{2} (24,533 sq mi)

Population (2023 census)
  - Total: 240,206
  - Density: 3.7804/km^{2} (9.7913/sq mi)
- Time zone: UTC+2 (CAT)
- HDI (2017): 0.711 high · 2nd
- Website: www.erc.com.na

Erongo is one of the 14 regions of Namibia. The capital is Swakopmund. It is named after Mount Erongo, a well-known landmark in Namibia and in this area. Erongo contains the municipalities of Walvis Bay, Swakopmund, Henties Bay and Omaruru, as well as the towns Arandis, Karibib and Usakos. All the main centres within this region are connected by paved roads.

The Erongo Region had a population of 150,809 in 2011. As of 2020, it had 119,784 registered voters.

In the west, Erongo has a shoreline on the Atlantic Ocean. On land, it borders the following regions:

- Kunene - north
- Otjozondjupa - northeast
- Khomas - southeast
- Hardap - south

== Economy and infrastructure ==
Various mining operations occur within this region at places such as Navachab and on a smaller scale at places surrounding Uis and the desert area. Karibib also has a marble industry. Walvis Bay, fully incorporated into the Erongo Region in 1994, is the principal home of Namibia's fishing industry. Walvis Bay also boasts the only deep sea port and is the second largest town in the country. Swakopmund and Langstrand are popular beach resorts; Arandis supports mining industry and Swakopmund boasts manufacturing.

This region, with its link to the coast of Namibia, is well developed. Facilities such as schools, hospitals and clinics, the supply of electricity and telecommunication services are, with a few exceptions, well established. Erongo has 66 schools with a total of 32,114 pupils.

== Politics ==
Erongo constituencies (2014)

=== Constituencies ===
The region comprises seven electoral constituencies:

- Arandis
- Dâures (formerly Brandberg Constituency)
- Karibib
- Omaruru
- Swakopmund
- Walvis Bay Rural
- Walvis Bay Urban

=== Regional elections ===
Erongo is one of a few Namibian regions where there is considerable opposition support. In the 2004 regional election for the National Assembly of Namibia, the South West Africa People's Organization (SWAPO) won in five of the seven constituencies, two were won by the United Democratic Front (UDF).

In the 2015 regional elections, SWAPO obtained 65% of the total votes (2010: 67%) and won six of the seven constituencies with only Dâures, traditionally a UDF stronghold, narrowly won by the opposition. In the 2020 regional election the Independent Patriots for Change (IPC), an opposition party formed in August 2020, was the strongest party. It obtained 36.8% of votes overall and won three constituencies, including Swakopmund and Walvis Bay Urban. SWAPO obtained 30.5% of all votes and also won three constituencies. Dâures was again narrowly won by the UDF.

The governors of Erongo are:

- Cleophas Mutjavikua (2015–2020)
- Neville Andre Itope (2020–2025)
- Natalia ǀGoagoses (2025–)

== Demographics ==
According to the Namibia 2023 Population and Housing Census, Erongo had a population of 240,206 (117,884 females and 122,322 males or 104 males for every 100 females) growing at an annual rate of 3.9%. The fertility rate was 2.9 children per woman. 89.9% inhabitants lived in urban areas while 10.1% lived in rural areas, and with an area of 63,579 km^{2}, the population density was 3.8 persons per km^{2}. By age, 11% of the population was under 5 years old, 18.6% between 5–14 years, 36.4% between 15–34 years, 28.3% between 34-59 years, and 5.8% were 60 years and older. The population was divided into 74,795 households, with an average size of 3.1 persons. 42.7% of households had a female head of house, while 57.3% had a male head. For those 15 years and older, 70.3% had never married, 21.3% married with certificate, 1.4% married traditionally, 2.6% in a consensual union, 1.7% were divorced or separated, and 2.1% were widowed.

The most commonly spoken languages at home were Oshiwambo (38.8% of households), Afrikaans (20.4%), and Damara/Nama (18.8%), Herero (9.6%) and English (5.3%) . For those 15 years and older, the literacy rate was 95.4%. In terms of education, 89% of girls and 86% of boys between the ages of 6–15 were attending school, and of those older than 15, 78.1% had left school, 15.6% were currently at school, and 4.4% had never attended.

In 2001 the employment rate for the labor force (71% of those 15+) was 66% employed and 34% unemployed. For those 15+ years old and not in the labor force (24%), 35% were students, 34% homemakers, and 31% retired, too old, etc. According to the 2023 Namibia Labour Force Survey, unemployment in the Erongo Region stood at 32%. The two studies are methodologically not comparable.

Among households, 97.6% had safe water, 9.7% no toilet facility, 77.9% electricity for lighting, 47.8% access to internet, and 13.3% had wood or charcoal for cooking. In terms of household's main sources of income, 0.7% derived it from farming, 68.7% from wages and salaries, 8% cash remittances, 7.5% from business or non-farming, and 7.7% from pension.

== See also ==
- Skeleton Coast
