= Dorob National Park =

National park of Namibia

- IUCN category II (national park)
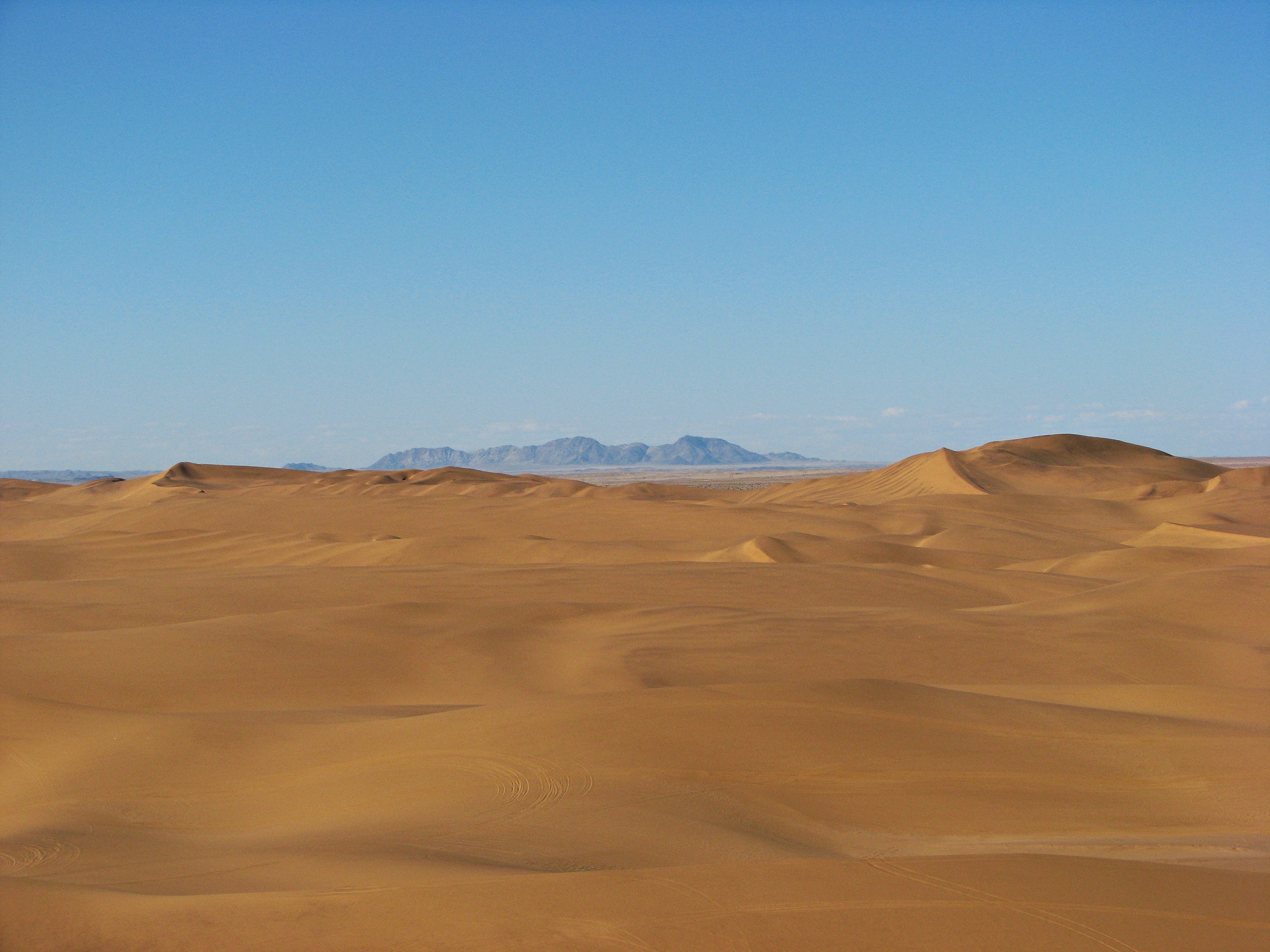

- Location within Namibia
- Location: Namibia
- Coordinates: 22°55′40.26″S 14°33′51.98″E
- Area: 107,540 km^{2} (41,520 sq mi)
- Established: December 1, 2010
- Governing body: Ministry of Environment and Tourism, Namibia

The Dorob National Park ("dry land") is a protected area in the Erongo region, along the central Namibian coast, gazetted as a national park under the Nature Conservation Ordinance No.4 of 1975 on 1 December 2010. It is 1,600 kilometres (990 mi) in length, and with Namib-Naukluft Park it covers an area of 107,540 square kilometres (41,520 sq mi).

The park extends from the Kuiseb Delta (south of Walvis Bay), north to the Ugab River, and west from the Atlantic Ocean to what was before the National West Coast Tourist Recreation Area. Some 75 species of birds flock to this coast, with nearly 1.6 million birds recorded on the coast.

== History ==
Before the park was declared a national park, as part of the larger intent to create one continuous coastal protected area, it was called the Walvis Bay Nature Reserve under the Cape Department of Nature Conservation. After Namibia became an independent country, the reserve became a part of Namibian territory as part of the Walvis Bay enclave. There was a proposal to name the reserve Walvis Bay National Park which proved fruitless and finally the central part of the coast area was named Dorob National Park. While the Walvis Bay Lagoon, a Ramsar Site, and the belt of dune and gravel plains that lie between the Swakop and Kuiseb rivers west of the Namib-Naukluft Park are included, Swakopmund, Henties Bay, and Wlotzkasbaken are excluded. Other exclusions are a railway line, certain road reserves of both major and minor routes, some district roads, as well as certain farms.

National Geographic said in June 2011 that "[w]ith the creation of Dorob National Park in December 2010, the coastline from the Kunene River on the Angolan border to the Orange River on the South African border was an almost solid barrier of parks. All the pieces were in place for what may eventually be designated Namib-Skeleton Coast National Park—a single coastal megapark."

The Trans-Kalahari Highway passes through the park and there are several mining, fishing, and industrial towns located on this route.

It has been alleged that filming in the park in 2012 for the Mad Max sequel Fury Road caused significant damage to the park's habitat.

== Wildlife ==
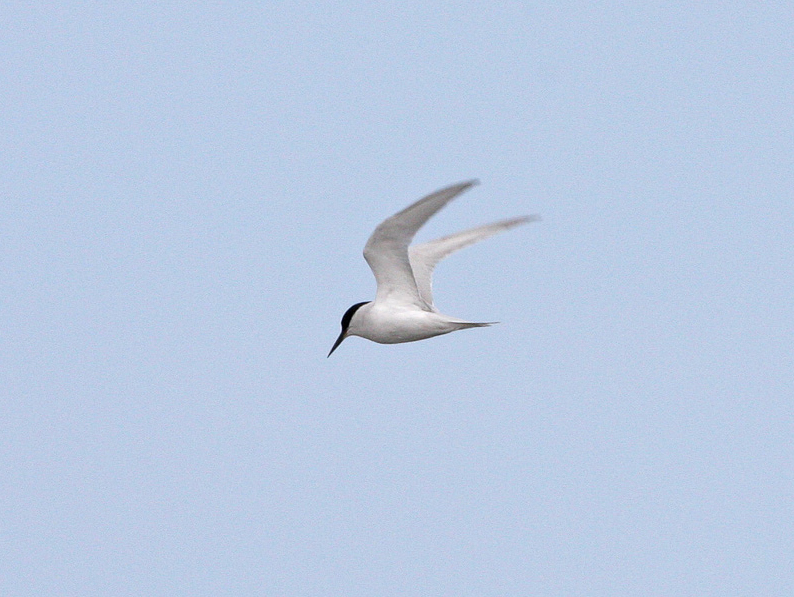
Damara tern (Sternula balaenarum) in the park

This park has "a spectacular coastal dune belt, vast gravel plains, Namibia’s richest coastal area for birds, rich botanical diversity, and major ephemeral river systems and their river mouths." The central coast line of 1,600 kilometres (990 mi), which includes the Dorob National Park, is an area of hyper arid desert. Some 75 species of birds flock to this coast, with nearly 1.6 million birds recorded on the coast. BirdLife International has therefore included the park under the category of Important Bird Area. The Damara tern, (Sternula balaenarum), a species of tern in the family Sternidae, a breeding seabird which is endemic to Namibia is considered a flagship species of the coastal area, and is found in the park, although non-breeding individuals migrate to the north in winter. Some of the lichen fields are also part of this protected environment.

== Conservation measures ==
While tourism and sports and recreational activities in non sensitive areas are allowed, the basic objective of the National park declaration is to implement conservation measures. To maintain this objective, several laws and guidelines have been framed. The laws are particular to tourism and sports and recreational activities.

It is forbidden for powered aircraft to fly below the altitude of 1 kilometre (0.62 miles) unless carrying out the take-off or landing sequence. All commercial, construction, and competitive activities within the park are prohibited, unless the organiser has obtained prior permission in the form of a permit from the "Ministry of Environment and Tourism". The feeding, containing, hunting, chasing, injuring, or killing of any animal is expressly forbidden, as is the destruction or collection of any object deemed to have "botanical, zoological, geological, archaeological, historical or any other scientific interest".

On the management aspect of this unique park the project co-coordinator of the Namibia Coast Conservation and Management (NACOMA) project, Rod Braby, has stated that "The Dorob National Park is managed as a big open system with connections to the marine, coastal and escarpment areas. And the park is managed to prevent and minimise damage to important habitats while aiming for long-term health, productivity and climate change adaption."

As the park is allowed to be used for tourism and recreational purposes in restricted areas only, it has been divided into zones. The identified zones are: Damara tern breeding sites, gravel plains, important birds areas, the Kuiseb Delta, Sandwich Harbour, Swakop River, Tsumas Delta, Walvis Bay Lagoon, birding areas and lichen fields."
