= Namwater Desalination Plant =

Desalination plant in Namibia

- Location within Namibia
- Interactive map of Namwater Desalination Plant
- Location: Wlotzkasbaken, Erongo Region, Namibia
- Coordinates: 22°23′54″S 14°27′26″E
- Estimated output: 20,000,000 cubic meters (2.0×10^{10} L) of water annually
- Extended output: 30,000,000 cubic meters (3.0×10^{10} L) of water annually
- Technology: Filtration, Reverse osmosis, Chlorination
- Operation date: 31 March 2027; 9 months' time (Expected)

The Namwater Desalination Plant, is a sea water desalination plant under development in Namibia. The facility is being developed by Namwater, the national water utility parastatal company of Namibia. It is intended to address the severe water scarcity in the middle Namibia coastal area, in the Erongo Region, and in the capital city of Windhoek.

== Location ==
The desalination plant would be located in the Namib Desert, near the settlement of Wlotzkasbaken, in the Erongo Region of Namibia. This new plant would sit adjacent to the privately owned Erongo Desalination Plant, commercially commissioned in 2010. The land that will host the new plant was donated to Namwater by the Erongo Regional Council.

Wlotzkasbaken is located approximately 35 kilometres (22 mi) north of Swakopmund, the nearest large town and approximately 390 kilometres (242 mi) by road, west of Windhoek, the national capital and largest city in the country.

== Overview ==
Namibia is an arid, water-stressed country. As of 2024, the Erongo Region sources its potable water from (a) groundwater aquifers from the Omaruru Delta, (b) the Kuiseb Delta and (c) desalinated water from the Erongo Desalination Plant. The water sources are "interconnected by a network of pump stations, pipelines, and reservoirs".

However, with an increasing urban population, increasing mining activity, increased agricultural production and industrial demand, the above three water sources are close to their maximum utility and provide just under 30,000,000 cubic meters (3.0×10^{10} L) of potable water annually.

In view of the above, in 2024, the government of Namibia authorized the construction of a new modular desalination plant with initial capacity output of 20,000,000 cubic meters (2.0×10^{10} L) of potable water annually, expandable, as and when necessary.

== Developers ==
The national water utility parastatal, Namwater is the owner and main developer of this project. Collaborating with Namwater is the Chinese-owned Swakop Uranium Mine. The development has been in the pipeline since 1998. The plans were updated in 2016, after the government turned down an offer to buy the privately owned Erongo Desalination plant at a cost of NAD3 billion (approximately US$164 million in 2024 money). The situation is made more dire by the severe drought conditions affecting the countries of Southern Africa, including Namibia in the third decade of the 21st century (2021 - 2030).

== Cost ==
The development of this water treatment plant is estimated to cost N$3.5 billion (approx. US$191 million) in 2024.

- Note: US$1.00 = NAD18.34 on 28 June 2024.

== Timetable ==
Construction is scheduled to begin in Q1 2025, with commercial commissioning planned in H1 2027.

== See also ==
- Desalination
- Erongo Desalination Plant
- Bethanie Desalination Plant
