= Erongo Desalination Plant =

Desalination plant in Namibia

- Location within Namibia
- Interactive map of Erongo Desalination Plant
- Location: Wlotzkasbaken, Erongo Region, Namibia
- Coordinates: 22°22′19″S 14°26′28″E
- Estimated output: 20,000,000 cubic meters (2.0×10^{10} L) of water annually
- Extended output: 45,000,000 cubic meters (4.5×10^{10} L) of water annually
- Cost: N$2.5 billion (US$153 million)
- Technology: Reverse osmosis, chlorination
- Operation date: 1 June 2010; 16 years ago

The Erongo Desalination Plant, also known as the Orano Desalination Plant, is a sea water desalination plant in Namibia. The facility was constructed between 2008 and 2010 by Orano Mining Namibia, part of the French nuclear fuel cycle company Orano, which at the time was known as Areva Ressources Namibia, part of Areva.

The desalination plant was established to supply water to Oranos Trekkopje Uranium Mine. At the time this plant was commissioned, it was the largest reverse osmosis desalination plant in Southern Africa.

== Location ==
The desalination plant is located in the Namib Desert, near the settlement of Wlotzkasbaken, in the Erongo Region of Namibia. The plant is located approximately 35 kilometres (22 mi) north of Swakopmund, the nearest large town. Swakopmund is located approximately 391 kilometres (243 mi) by road, west of Windhoek, the capital and largest city in the country. The geographical coordinates of Erongo Desalination Plant are 22°22'19.0"S, 14°26'28.0"E (Latitude:-22.371944; Longitude:14.441111).

== Overview ==
The Erongo Desalination Plant was developed and is owned by Orano Resources Namibia (formerly Areva Resources Namibia). The purified drinking water was primarily intended for use in Orano's uranium mine known as the Trekkopje Mine, located near Arandis, Namibia. The clean water has to be pumped from the plant to Arandis, a straight-line distance of about 60 kilometres (37 mi) and a road distance of approximately 90 kilometres (56 mi). The plant is operated by Nafasi Water, a "water technology and water utility service company", based in Rosebank, Gauteng, South Africa.

The potable water is then sold to NamWater, the national water utility company, for distribution to the city of Swakopmund, the nearby mines and other areas of Erongo Region. Output can be varied according to demand ranging from 12,000,000 cubic meters (1.2×10^{10} L) annually to 26,000,000 cubic meters (2.6×10^{10} L), with the present infrastructure. If the need arose new infrastructure can be added to supply 45,000,000 cubic meters (4.5×10^{10} L) annually.

The raw sea water is taken through the following processes, during purification: (a) screen filtration (b) ultrafiltration (c) reverse osmosis (d) limestone contact and (e) chlorination.

== Cost ==
The development of this water treatment plant cost N$2.5 billion (approx. US$153 million) in 2010.

== Other developments ==
In July 2022, the owners of this facility signed a power purchase agreement (PPA) with InnoSun (a subsidiary of the French firm InnoVent) to design, build, own, operate and maintain a 5 MW solar power station and supply that energy to Erongo Desalination Plant for a 10-year contract term, starting on the date of commercial commissioning. Construction is expected to start during the second half of 2022, with commissioning expected in 2023. Orano expects the new solar farm to reduce the desalination plant's carbon dioxide emissions by 30 percent or nearly 10,000 metric tonnes annually.

== See also ==
- Witsand Solar Desalination Plant
- Namwater Desalination Plant
- Bethanie Desalination Plant
