= Bethanie Desalination Plant =

Desalination plant in Namibia

- Location within Namibia
- Interactive map of Bethanie Desalination Plant
- Location: Bethanie, ǁKaras Region
- Coordinates: 26°30′29″S 17°08′34″E
- Estimated output: 487 cubic meters (487,000 L) of water daily
- Cost: US$2.3 million
- Technology: Reverse osmosis, chlorination
- Percent of water supply: Estimated 100% of Bethanie Town Council
- Operation date: July 2022

The Bethanie Desalination Plant, also Bethany Desalination Plant, is a brackish water desalination plant in the settlement of Bethanie in southern Namibia. The facility is owned and was developed by the Namibia Water Corporation (NamWater). The potable water produced by this plant, whose capacity production is 487 cubic meters (487,000 L) per day, is expected to supply the town of Bethanie until 2037.

== Location ==
The desalination plant is located in the town of Bethanie, in the ǁKaras Region of Namibia. Bethanie is located approximately 140 kilometres (87 mi), west of Keetmanshoop, the capital of ǁKaras Region. Bethanie is located approximately 535 kilometres (332 mi) south of Windhoek, the capital and largest city in the country.

== Overview ==
The objective of this project is to improve the quantity and quality of drinking water available to the inhabitants of Bethany. It was developed as a pilot project to explore the feasibility of desalinating brackish ground water for domestic and light commercial use. This is part of the Namibian government's attempt to increase water supply to Namibians, from 85 percent in 2022 to 100 percent. Namibia has set a goal to have 100 percent potable water supply to her citizens and residents by 2030.

The plant is designed to process raw brackish ground water through desalination equipment that includes reverse osmosis membranes. Due to the rural location, renewable energy sources were selected. The installation is fitted with solar panels, so that the sun provides the power to fuel the desalination process.

== Development ==
A number of national and international stakeholders worked together to design, construct and fund this desalination plant. The table below details the entities that supported this development.

Stakeholders in development Of Bethany Desalination Plant
Rank	Member	Domicile		Notes
1	NamWater	Namibia	National water parastatal utility company. Owner/operator.	
2	Desert Research Foundation of Namibia	Namibia	National research institution	
3	Adaptation Fund	United States	International climate change organization	
4	Namibian Ministry of Environment, Forestry and Tourism	Namibia	Namibian Government Ministry	

The Multilateral Environmental Agreements Division of the Namibian Ministry of Environment, Forestry and Tourism is a stakeholder in the development of this plant.

== Funding and timeline ==
The construction is reported to have cost N$37 million (approx. US$2.3 million), funded by the stakeholders listed in the previous section. Construction took place between "October 2020 and October 2021", with commercial commissioning in July 2022.

== See also ==
- Desalination
- Water supply and sanitation in Namibia
- Erongo Desalination Plant
- Namwater Desalination Plant
