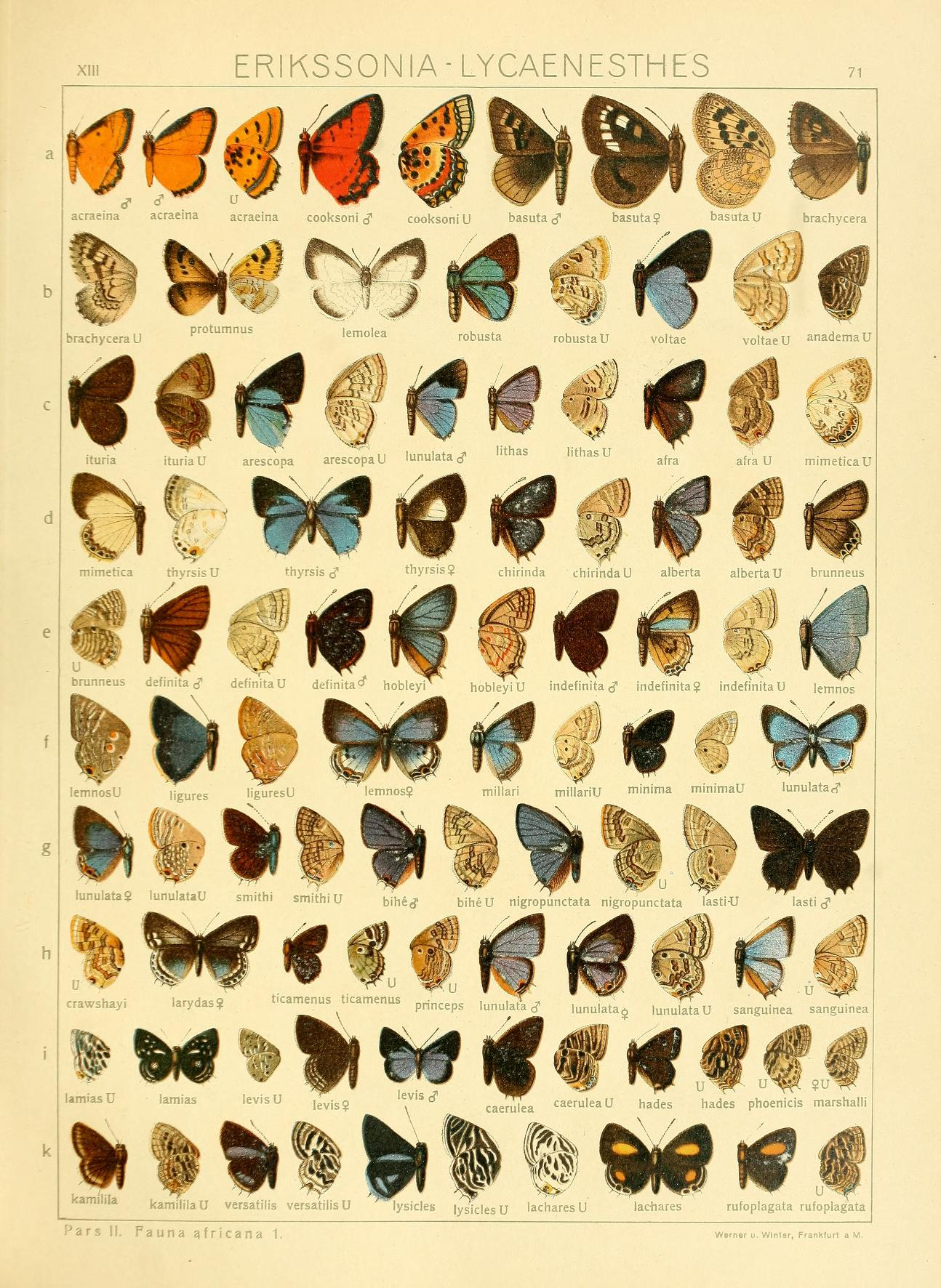

Scientific classification
- Kingdom: Animalia
- Phylum: Arthropoda
- Class: Insecta
- Order: Lepidoptera
- Family: Lycaenidae
- Genus: Anthene
- Species: A. minima

Binomial name
- Anthene minima (Trimen, 1893)

Synonyms
- Lycaenesthes minima Trimen, 1893

= Anthene minima =

Little hairtail

Species of butterfly

Anthene minima, the little hairtail, is a butterfly of the family Lycaenidae. It is found in South Africa and Botswana. In South Africa, it is found in north-eastern KwaZulu-Natal, Mpumalanga, and Limpopo.

== Description ==
The wingspan is 18–22 mm (0.71–0.87 in) for males and 19–23 mm (0.75–0.91 in) for females. Adults are on wing from September to April.

Its nearest relative, Anthene lindae, is found approximately 400 km (250 mi) to the west, endemic to the Northern Cape, with a few occurrences at Witsand in the Western Cape.

== Habitat and behavior ==
The larvae likely feed on Acacia species.
