= Trekkopje =

- Location within Namibia
- Coordinates: 22.293°S 15.103°E
- Country: Namibia
- Time zone: UTC+2 (SAST)

Trekkopje is a mountain in the Erongo Region of Namibia, c. 85 kilometres (53 mi) north-east of Swakopmund on the road to Usakos.

== History ==
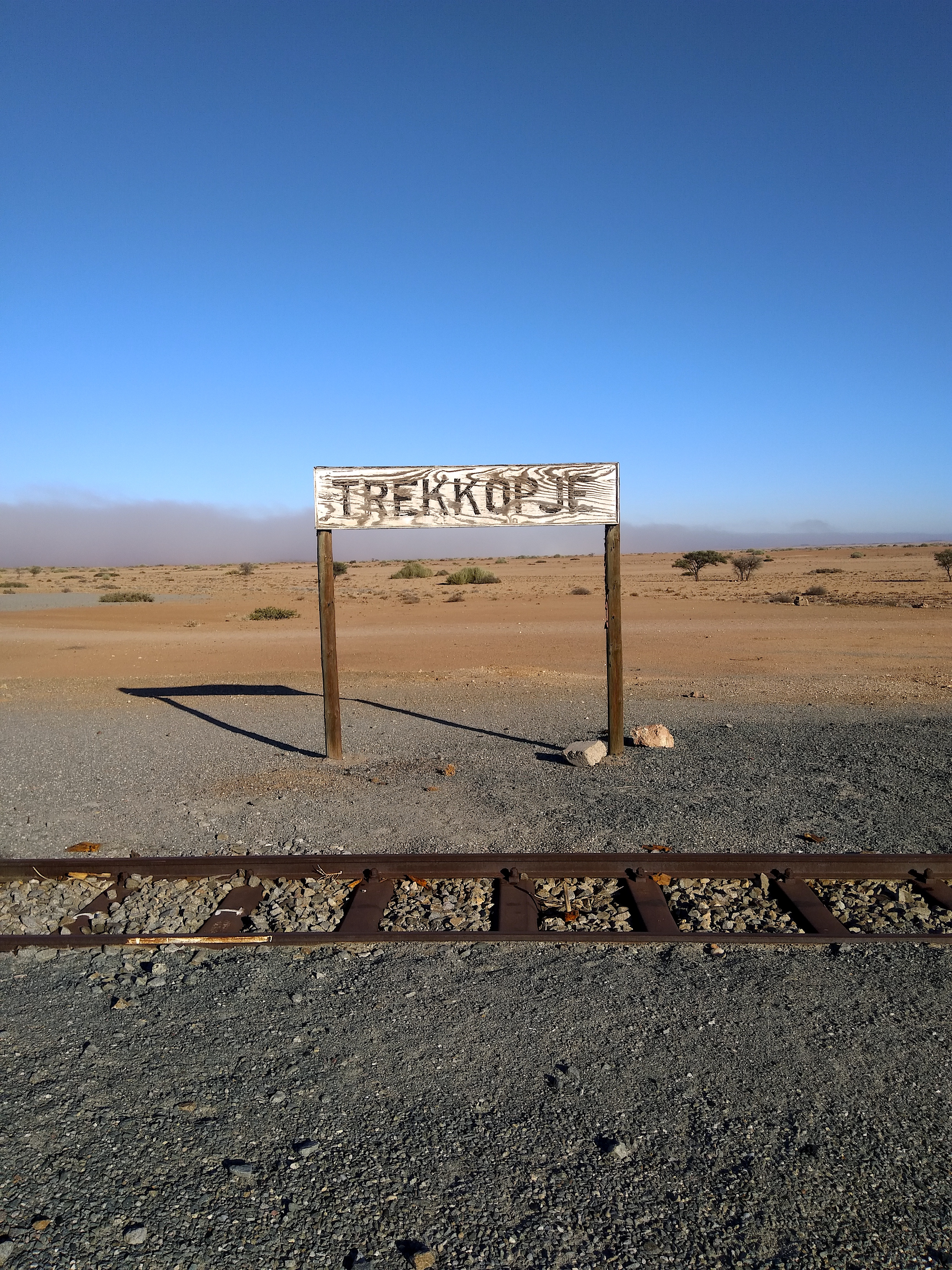
Trekkopje railway stop

The Swakopmund–Windhoek railway line goes past the mountain. When the Swakopmund-Windhoek line was converted from 610 mm (2 ft) to 3 ft 6 in (1,067 mm) in 1910, a patch of railway west of Karibib was not completed, and passengers and load had to be moved twice, in Karibib and at Trekkopje. Today the railway station no longer stands, and the railway stop is not in use anymore, either.

Trekkopje was the site of the Battle of Trekkopjes, a World War I battle aimed at preventing South African troops from rebuilding the railway line. A war cemetery, Trekkopje Cemetery (22.288°S 15.102°E) features 16 graves of railway protection troops from this battle.

== Trekkopje mine ==
Trekkopje mine, a currently unused Uranium mine of the French company Areva (now Orano) is situated about 20 kilometres (12 mi) north of the mountain. Trekkopje desalination plant is in turn named after the mine, as it was built to provide the mine with water. The desalination plant is situated at the Atlantic coast near Wlotzkasbaken.
