= Anthene lindae =

Linda's hairtail

Conservation status
- Near Threatened (IUCN 3.1)

Scientific classification
- Kingdom: Animalia
- Phylum: Arthropoda
- Class: Insecta
- Order: Lepidoptera
- Family: Lycaenidae
- Genus: Anthene
- Species: A. lindae

Binomial name
- Anthene lindae Henning & Henning, 1994

Species of butterfly

Anthene lindae, the Linda's hairtail, is a butterfly of the family Lycaenidae. It is endemic to the arid Northern Cape in South Africa. A few specimens have also been recorded at Witsand, in the Western Cape.

== Description ==
The wingspan is about 19 mm (0.75 in) for males and about 22 mm (0.87 in) for females. Adults are on wing from September to December. There is one generation per year.

Its nearest relative, Anthene minima, is found approximately 400 km (250 mi) to the east, in KwaZulu-Natal, Mpumalanga, and the Okavango Delta in Botswana.

== Habitat and behavior ==
The larvae possibly feed on Acacia erioloba species.
