= Battle of Trekkopjes =

- Part of South West Africa Campaign
Date	26 April 1915
Location	Trekkopjes, German Southwest Africa 22°17′33″S 15°06′02″E
Result	South African victory

Belligerents
Germany: German Southwest Africa	South Africa

Commanders and leaders
Maj. Hermann Ritter	(Union of South Africa) Col. P. C. B. Skinner

Strength
700–1,500; 2 field guns	1,350; 9 armoured cars

Casualties and losses
14 killed 14 wounded 13 captured	8 killed 34 wounded
- Location within Namibia Battle of Trekkopjes (Africa)

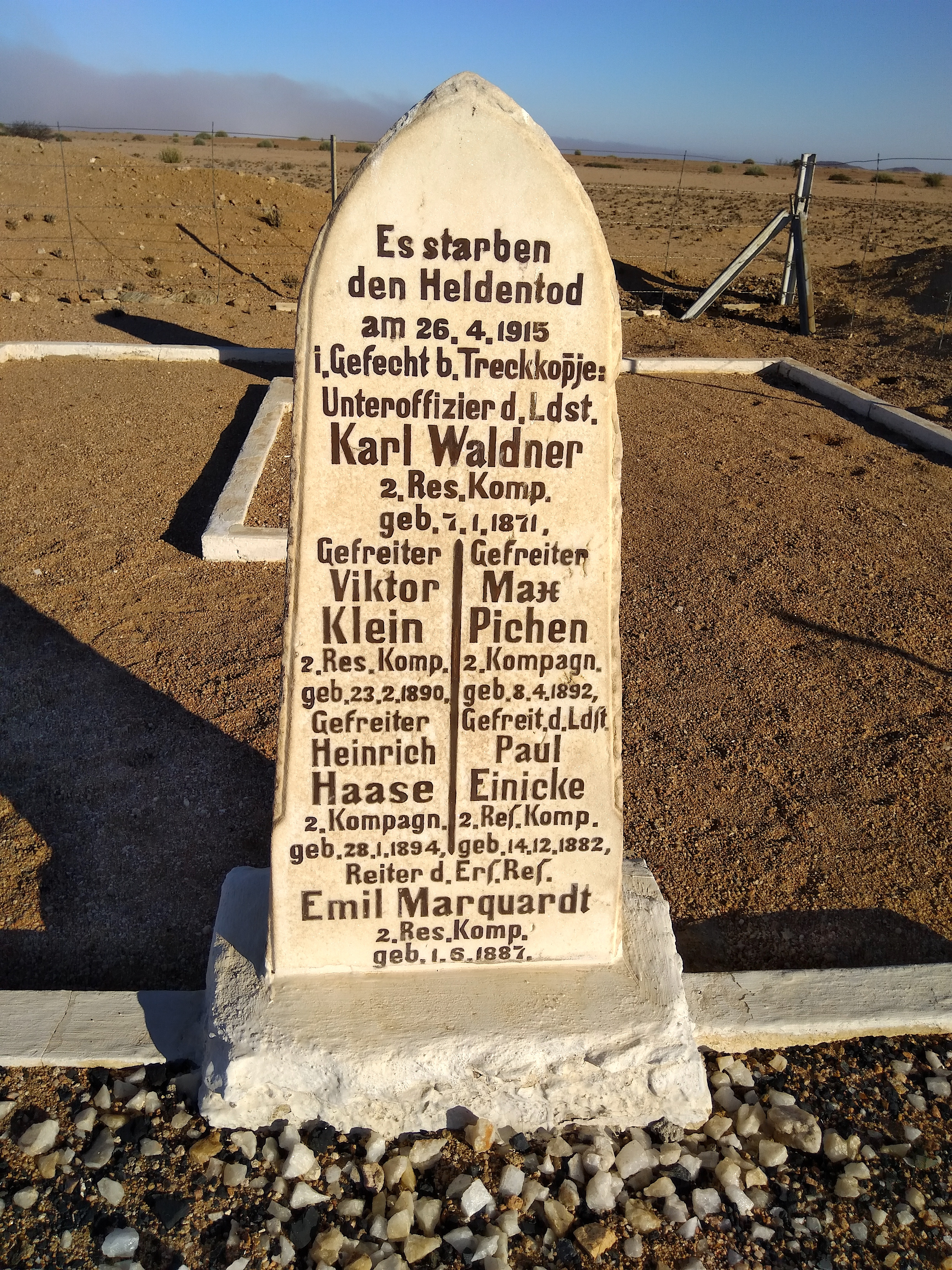
War cemetery in Trekkopje

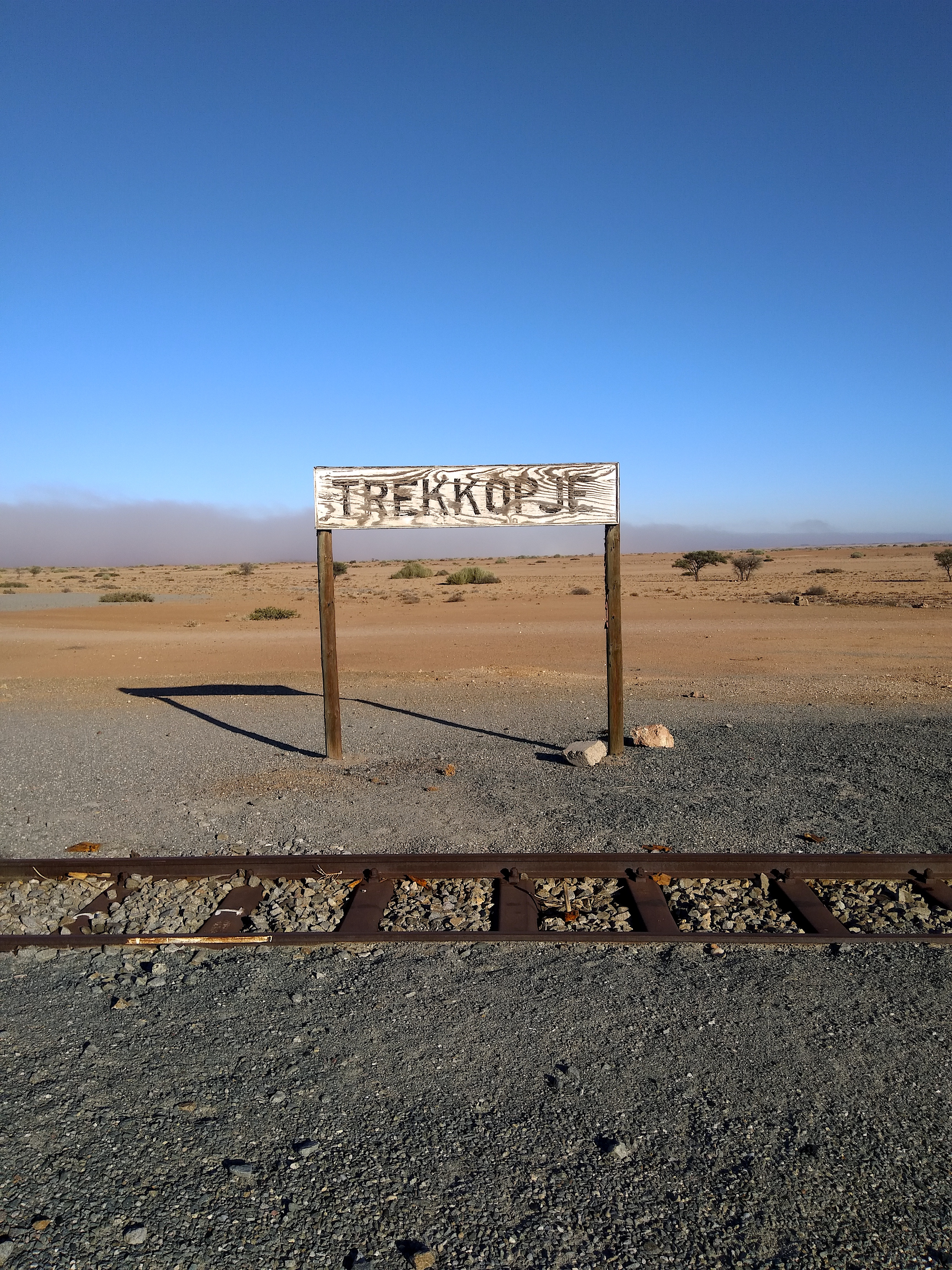
Trekkopje railway station close to the war cemetery

The Battle of Trekkopjes on 26 April 1915 was a German assault on the South African held railway station of Trekkopjes during the South West Africa Campaign of World War I. The South African Major Skinner had been ordered to defend Trekkopjes, and came into contact with a German column advancing on the station. Skinner withdrew back into Trekkopjes and dug in his forces. The German attack was repulsed with the help of armoured cars, leaving the South Africans victorious. The Battle of Trekkopjes saw the last German offensive in German South West Africa leaving them on the defensive for the remainder of the campaign.

== Background ==
After losing significant ground to the South Africans under Botha, the German army under Franke in German Southwest Africa began preparations to go on the offensive again. By mid April it was decided to attack the South African held railway station of Trekkopjes, and a German scout plane had gathered intelligence of the South African forces holding the station.

== Battle ==
At 5:45 A.M. the Germans appeared close to Trekkopjes and blew the rail line to the east of the camp in an attempt to prevent Allied reinforcements from arriving. By 7:40 the Germans began their attack on the Allied positions by shelling the encampment's tents with artillery. Since Colonel Skinner's men lacked artillery they were unable to respond to the German shelling, and waited until the Germans assaulted their position.

After five hours of fighting the South Africans forced the Germans to retreat by attacking their flanks with machine guns mounted in armoured cars.

== Aftermath ==
Though neither side suffered heavy casualties, the German defeat greatly demoralized Franke's men. For the rest of the campaign the Germans would stay on the defensive and were pushed further and further back until the main body finally surrendered a few months later after the Battle of Otavi.
