= Witsand Solar Desalination Plant =

Solar powered desalination plant in South Africa

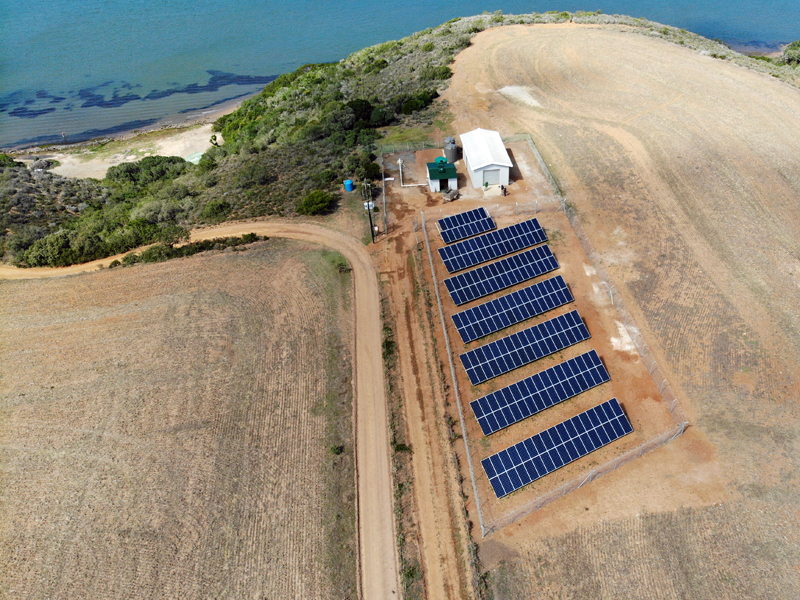

- Location within South Africa
- Interactive map of Witsand Solar Desalination Plant
- Location: Witsand, Hessequa Municipality, Western Cape Province
- Coordinates: 34°24′3″S 20°47′17″E
- Estimated output: 100,000 liters (100 m^{3}) of water daily
- Extended output: 300,000 liters (300 m^{3}) of water daily
- Cost: R9 million (US$605,000)
- Technology: Sedimentation, reverse osmosis, chlorination
- Operation date: December 2018

Witsand Solar Desalination Plant (WSDP) is a solar powered desalination plant located in the seaside town of Witsand, in Hessequa Local Municipality, in the Western Cape Province, at the mouth of the Breede River.

== Overview ==
The town of Witsand is a tourist attraction, with a low-season population of approximately 300 people. During the tourist high-season, the population swells to over 3,000 people, leading to freshwater scarcity in the town. The plant was co-funded by the Western Cape Government through the drought relief fund, and by the French Treasury through a fund dedicated to the implementation of innovative green technologies.

== Technology ==
The WSDP is the first solar powered desalination plant in South Africa. Its new technology applications, allow for the elimination of storage batteries in the design. The technology, OSMOSUN®, was developed by the French Company Mascara Renewable Water and brought to South Africa by their local partner TWS-Turnkey Water Solutions.

The plant's new Osmosun technology involves the use of a specialised "intelligent" membrane that is able to continue delivering reverse osmosis, even when the sun goes behind a cloud, thus reducing the amount of solar energy delivered. The energy delivered would increase again when the clouds moved away.

That ability to "soften" the variability in the energy delivered, preserves the reverse osmosis membrane. At night, when there is no sun, the design allows the plant to switch to conventional grid-electricity and continue working all through the darkness, until the sun rises the next morning.

== Construction and cost ==
The project costed R9 million (US$605,000), and has been fully operational since December 20th, 2018.

The unit cost of the purified water at this plant is between R7 to R8 (US$0.52 to US$0.60) for every 1,000 liters (220 imp gal; 264 U.S. gal). In comparison, the temporary diesel-fuelled desalination plant at Strandfontein, in Cape Town, produces potable water at R35 to R40 (US$2.62 to US$3.00) for every 1,000 litres.

== Challenges ==
Due to the high electrical costs associated with its operation, the plant will only be commissioned during crisis periods and holiday seasons.

== See also ==
- Erongo Desalination Plant
- Water supply and sanitation in South Africa
