= Trekkopje mine =

Dormant uranium mine in Namibia

- Location: Erongo Region, Namibia
- Products: uranium
- Opened: 2011
- Closed: 2012
- Company: Areva

The Trekkopje mine is a shallow open pit mine which has been under care and maintenance since 2012. It is located at Trekkopje in the western part of Namibia in Erongo Region. Trekkopje represents one of the largest uranium reserves in Namibia, having estimated reserves of 340 million tonnes of ore grading 0.014% uranium.
