= Hessequa Local Municipality elections =

Local elections in the Western Cape, South Africa

The council of the Hessequa Local Municipality (previously the Langeberg Local Municipality) consists of seventeen members elected by mixed-member proportional representation. Nine councillors are elected by first-past-the-post voting in nine wards, while the remaining eight are chosen from party lists so that the total number of party representatives is proportional to the number of votes received. In the election of 3 August 2016 no party obtained a majority; the Democratic Alliance (DA) and the Freedom Front Plus (FF+) subsequently formed a coalition to govern the municipality.

The DA won a majority in the 2021 election and retained it in the 2026 election.

== Results ==
The following table shows the composition of the council after past elections.

Event	ANC	DA	FF+	PA	Other	Total
2000 election	7	8	—	—	0	15
2006 election	9	6	—	—	0	15
2011 election	6	7	—	—	2	15
2016 election	8	8	1	—	0	17
2021 election	6	9	1	1	0	17
2026 election	4	9	2	2	0	17

== December 2000 election ==
The following table shows the results of the 2000 election.

Party	Ward			List			Total seats
Party	Votes	%	Seats	Votes	%	Seats	Total seats
Democratic Alliance	8,263	51.57	3	8,358	52.07	5	8
African National Congress	7,655	47.78	5	7,693	47.93	2	7
Independent candidates	104	0.65	0				0
Total	16,022	100.00	8	16,051	100.00	7	15
Valid votes	16,022	98.55		16,051	98.74		
Invalid/blank votes	235	1.45		205	1.26		
Total votes	16,257	100.00		16,256	100.00		
Registered voters/turnout	20,588	78.96		20,588	78.96		

=== By-elections from December 2000 to September 2004 ===
The following by-elections were held to fill vacant ward seats in the period between the election in December 2000 and the floor crossing period in September 2004.

Date	Ward	Party of the previous councillor	Party of the newly elected councillor
27 August 2003	1	African National Congress	African National Congress

=== September 2004 floor crossing ===
In terms of the Eighth Amendment of the Constitution, in the period from 1–15 September 2004 councillors had the opportunity to cross the floor to a different political party without losing their seats. In the Langeberg council one councillor crossed from the Democratic Alliance to the African National Congress.

Party	Seats before	Net change	Seats after
African National Congress	7	▲1	8
Democratic Alliance	8	▼1	7

== March 2006 election ==
The following table shows the results of the 2006 election.

Party	Ward			List			Total seats
Party	Votes	%	Seats	Votes	%	Seats	Total seats
African National Congress	9,341	56.66	5	9,428	57.32	4	9
Democratic Alliance	6,644	40.30	3	6,667	40.54	3	6
African Christian Democratic Party	176	1.07	0	202	1.23	0	0
United Independent Front	117	0.71	0	150	0.91	0	0
Independent candidates	208	1.26	0				0
Total	16,486	100.00	8	16,447	100.00	7	15
Valid votes	16,486	99.20		16,447	99.05		
Invalid/blank votes	133	0.80		157	0.95		
Total votes	16,619	100.00		16,604	100.00		
Registered voters/turnout	24,360	68.22		24,360	68.16		

=== September 2007 floor crossing ===
The final floor-crossing period occurred on 1–15 September 2007; floor-crossing was subsequently abolished in 2008 by the Fifteenth Amendment of the Constitution. In the Hessequa council, one councillor from the Democratic Alliance (DA) crossed to the African National Congress, while another DA councillor left the party to sit as an independent.

Party	Seats before	Net change	Seats after
African National Congress	9	▲1	10
Democratic Alliance	6	▼2	4
Independent	—	▲1	1

== May 2011 election ==
The following table shows the results of the 2011 election.

Party	Ward			List			Total seats
Party	Votes	%	Seats	Votes	%	Seats	Total seats
Democratic Alliance	9,425	47.40	4	9,434	47.43	3	7
African National Congress	8,038	40.42	4	8,060	40.52	2	6
Congress of the People	1,330	6.69	0	1,301	6.54	1	1
Civic Independent	970	4.88	0	955	4.80	1	1
South African Progressive Civic Organisation	118	0.59	0	115	0.58	0	0
National Independent Civic Organisation	5	0.03	0	26	0.13	0	0
Total	19,886	100.00	8	19,891	100.00	7	15
Valid votes	19,886	99.24		19,891	99.26		
Invalid/blank votes	153	0.76		149	0.74		
Total votes	20,039	100.00		20,040	100.00		
Registered voters/turnout	27,251	73.53		27,251	73.54		

=== By-elections from May 2011 to August 2016 ===
The following by-elections were held to fill vacant ward seats in the period between the elections in May 2011 and August 2016.

Date	Ward	Party of the previous councillor	Party of the newly elected councillor
24 April 2013	7	Democratic Alliance	Democratic Alliance

== August 2016 election ==
The following table shows the results of the 2016 election.

Party	Ward			List			Total seats
Party	Votes	%	Seats	Votes	%	Seats	Total seats
African National Congress	9,935	45.69	6	10,040	46.59	2	8
Democratic Alliance	8,808	40.51	3	9,590	44.50	5	8
Freedom Front Plus	987	4.54	0	1,115	5.17	1	1
Independent candidates	1,359	6.25	0				0
Independent Civic Organisation of South Africa	531	2.44	0	543	2.52	0	0
Economic Freedom Fighters	83	0.38	0	124	0.58	0	0
Civic Independent	40	0.18	0	140	0.65	0	0
Total	21,743	100.00	9	21,552	100.00	8	17
Valid votes	21,743	99.46		21,552	98.62		
Invalid/blank votes	119	0.54		301	1.38		
Total votes	21,862	100.00		21,853	100.00		
Registered voters/turnout	30,950	70.64		30,950	70.61		

=== By-elections from August 2016 to November 2021 ===
The following by-election was held to fill a vacant ward seat in the period between the elections in August 2016 and November 2021.

Date	Ward	Party of the previous councillor	Party of the newly elected councillor
10 April 2019	4	African National Congress	Democratic Alliance

== November 2021 election ==
The following table shows the results of the 2021 election.

Party	Ward			List			Total seats
Party	Votes	%	Seats	Votes	%	Seats	Total seats
Democratic Alliance	10,391	49.67	6	10,597	50.70	3	9
African National Congress	7,309	34.94	3	7,245	34.66	3	6
Freedom Front Plus	1,647	7.87	0	1,577	7.54	1	1
Patriotic Alliance	572	2.73	0	606	2.90	1	1
Hessequa Peoples Movement	265	1.27	0	285	1.36	0	0
African Christian Democratic Party	159	0.76	0	182	0.87	0	0
Good	143	0.68	0	141	0.67	0	0
Independent candidates	182	0.87	0				0
Cape Independence Party	75	0.36	0	89	0.43	0	0
Independent Civic Organisation of South Africa	71	0.34	0	80	0.38	0	0
Economic Freedom Fighters	72	0.34	0	76	0.36	0	0
Eden United People's Party	32	0.15	0	24	0.11	0	0
Total	20,918	100.00	9	20,902	100.00	8	17
Valid votes	20,918	99.51		20,902	99.34		
Invalid/blank votes	103	0.49		138	0.66		
Total votes	21,021	100.00		21,040	100.00		
Registered voters/turnout	33,270	63.18		33,270	63.24		

== November 2026 election ==
The following table shows the results of the 2026 election.

Party	Ward			List			Total seats
Party	Votes	%	Seats	Votes	%	Seats	Total seats
Democratic Alliance	11,951	51.71	6	11,836	51.22	3	9
African National Congress	4,957	21.45	3	4,888	21.15	1	4
Patriotic Alliance	2,821	12.21	0	2,930	12.68	2	2
Freedom Front Plus	2,244	9.71	0	2,379	10.30	2	2
People's Movement for Change	658	2.85	0	643	2.78	0	0
Independent Ratepayers Association of SA	195	0.84	0	136	0.59	0	0
Economic Freedom Fighters	61	0.26	0	71	0.31	0	0
Cape Independence Party	54	0.23	0	51	0.22	0	0
South African Communist Party	48	0.21	0	48	0.21	0	0
National Coloured Congress	41	0.18	0	54	0.23	0	0
Eden United People's Party	18	0.08	0	30	0.13	0	0
Independent Civic Organisation of South Africa	30	0.13	0	14	0.06	0	0
African Transformation Movement	9	0.04	0	26	0.11	0	0
United Democratic Movement	23	0.10	0				0
Total	23,110	100.00	9	23,106	100.00	8	17
Valid votes	23,110	99.37		23,106	99.37		
Invalid/blank votes	146	0.63		147	0.63		
Total votes	23,256	100.00		23,253	100.00		
Registered voters/turnout	37,013	62.83		37,013	62.82		
