= Sandwich Harbour =

Former harbour on the Namibian Atlantic coast

- Sandvishawe (Afrikaans)
- Location in Namibia
- Coordinates: 23°22′S 14°29′E
- Ocean/sea sources: Atlantic Ocean
- Basin countries: Namibia
- Max. length: 4.2 km (2.6 mi)
- Max. width: 4 km (2.5 mi)

Ramsar Wetland
- Designated: 23 August 1995
- Reference no.: 743

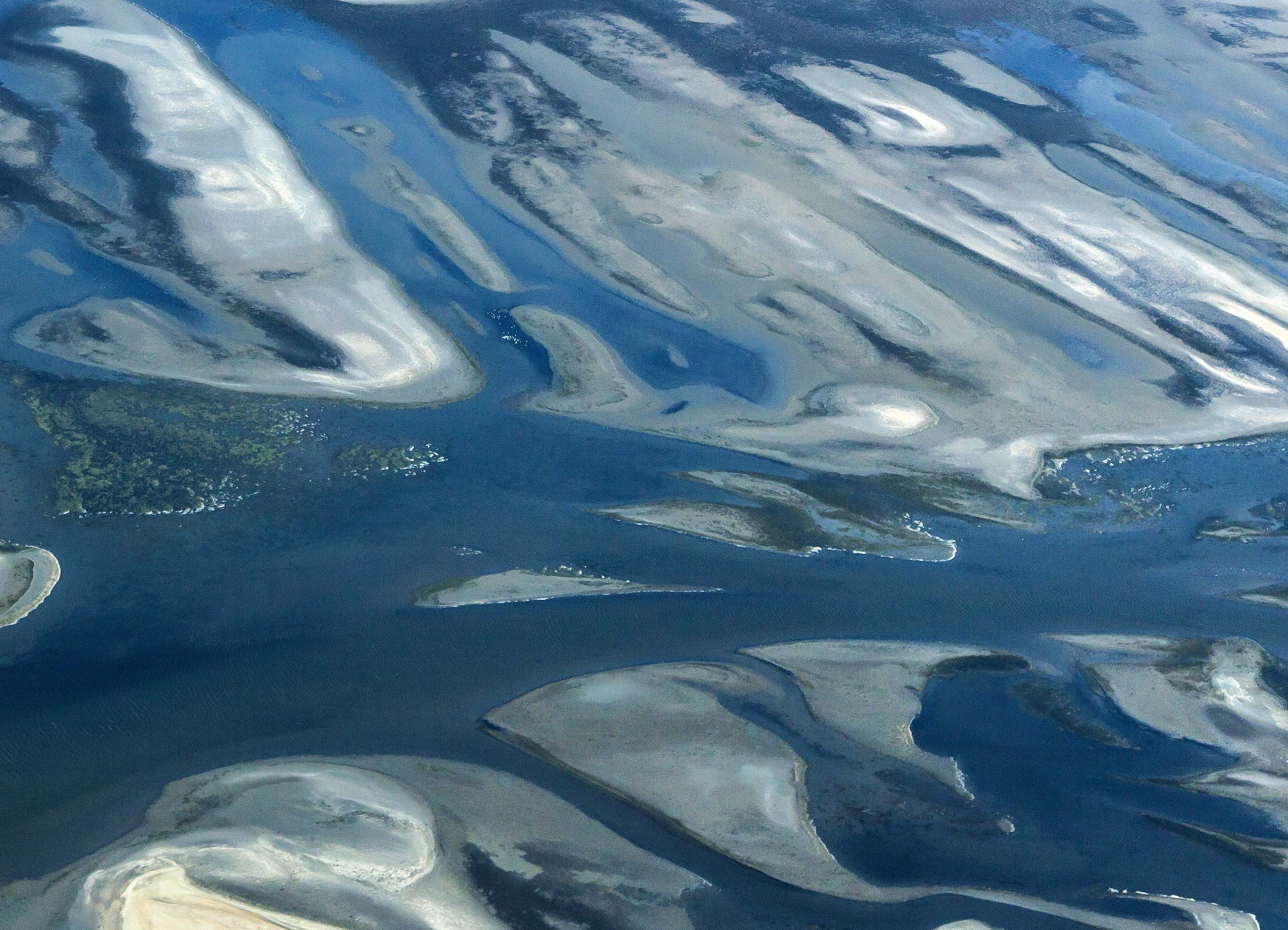
Aerial view of Sandwich Habour

Sandwich Harbour (Portuguese: Porto d'Ilhéu), also known as Sandwich Bay, Sandvishawe, Sandvisbaai and Sandfisch Bai, is an area on the Atlantic coast of Namibia that includes a bay in the north and a lagoon at the southern end. Sandwich Harbour might have been named after an English whaling ship, the Sandwich, which worked during the 1780s, or the name may be a corruption of the German word "sandfische", a species of shark found in the area. Formerly, the bay was a moderately-sized commercial port based around whaling and small-scale fishing, but it is now best known for its birdlife in the lagoon to the south of the bay.

== Geography ==
Located about 80 km south of Walvis Bay, the area is within the Erongo Region. The bay opens to the north and is about 4.2 km long and 4 km wide. There is a shallow lagoon lying south of the bay, separated from it by an area of beach ridges and swales with saltpans.

The lagoon is 3.7 km in length and 1 km wide and is enveloped by sandy desert on its eastern side. Former visitors to the area assumed that the water in the lagoon was fresh, but a recent survey found out that the lagoon is filled with poor quality brackish water that seeps under the dunes and allows the growth of large reed beds at the water's edge.

Sandwich Harbour was declared a Ramsar Site on 23 August 1995.

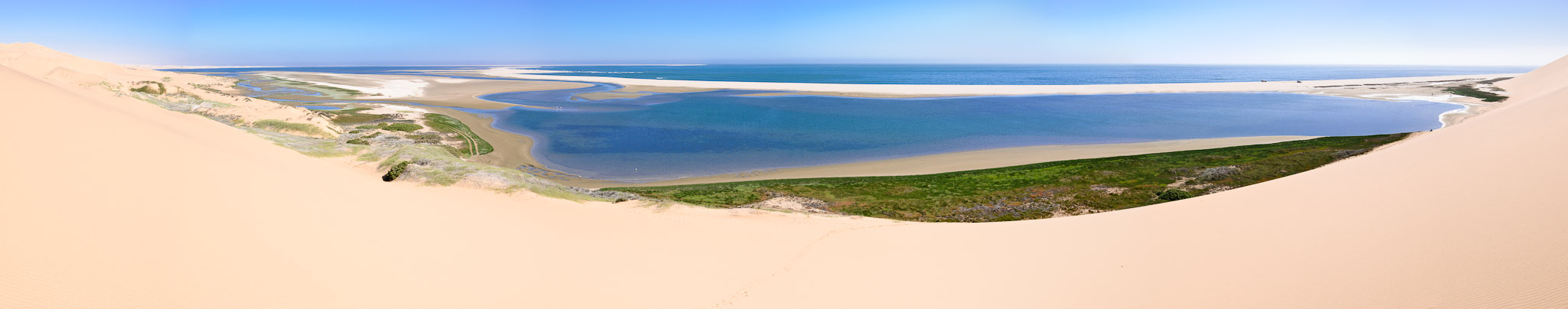
View of the lagoon south of Sandwich Bay

== History ==
The area was surveyed in the 1880s by the Royal Navy, but it was considered very inferior to Walvis Bay so no development took place. Occasional sealing vessels used the bay for anchorage instead of Walvis Bay, and there were some temporary settlements used by seasonal fishermen catching snoek (Thyrsites atun).

In the 1930s, an ambitious project was started to build a guano island in the lagoon using sand pumps imported from the Netherlands. Unfortunately, jackals were able to cross to the island at low tide and chase the birds away. All that remains of the project is the manager's house.

Currently, the bay and lagoon are within the Namib-Naukluft National Park. To enter, visitors need a permit, which can be obtained from the office of the Ministry of Environment and Tourism in Swakopmund. The fauna was surveyed by the South African Museum and the National Museum of Namibia, which found that the fauna was totally marine.

== Gallery ==
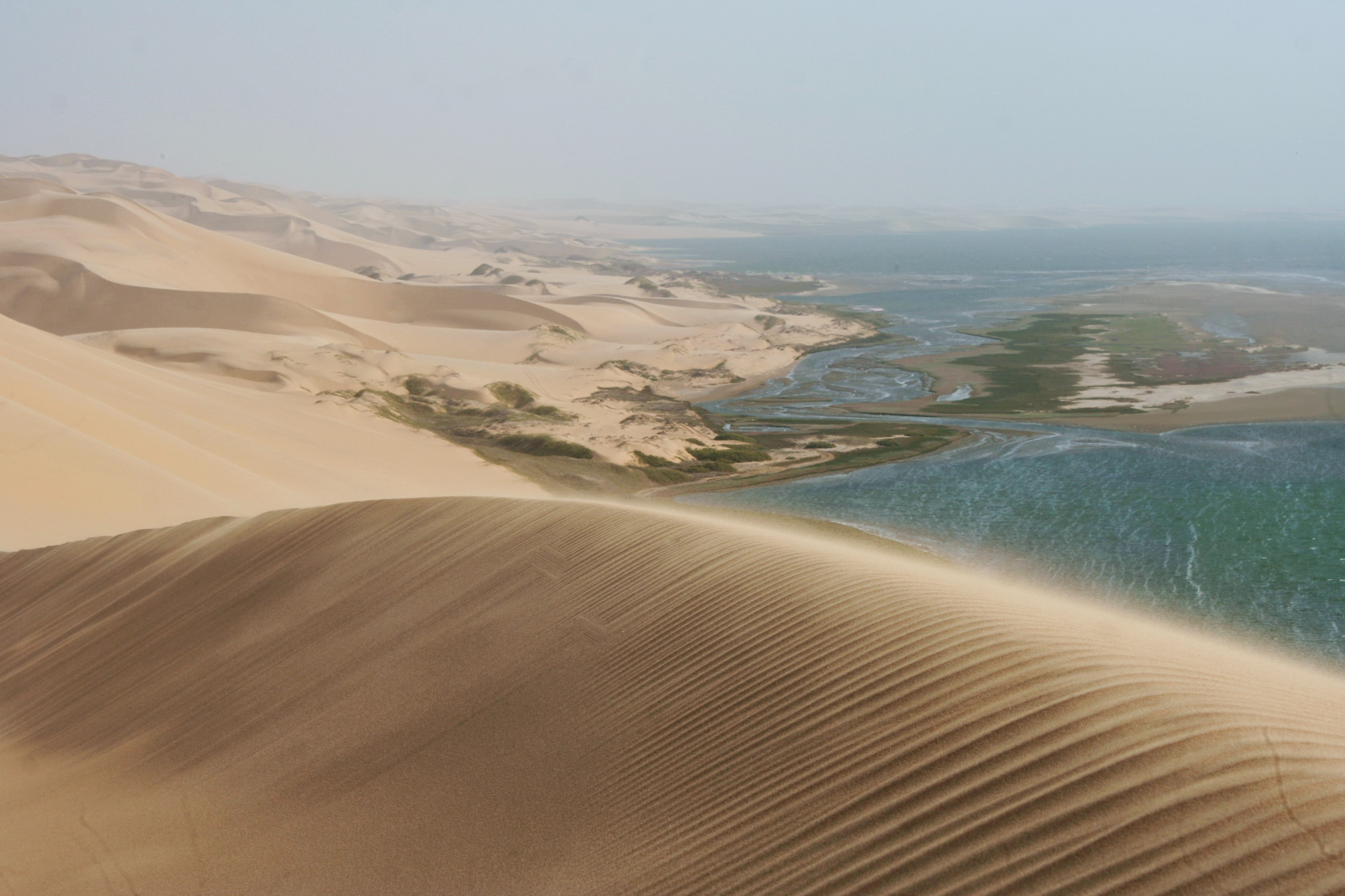
The Sandwich Harbour seen from atop a sand dune

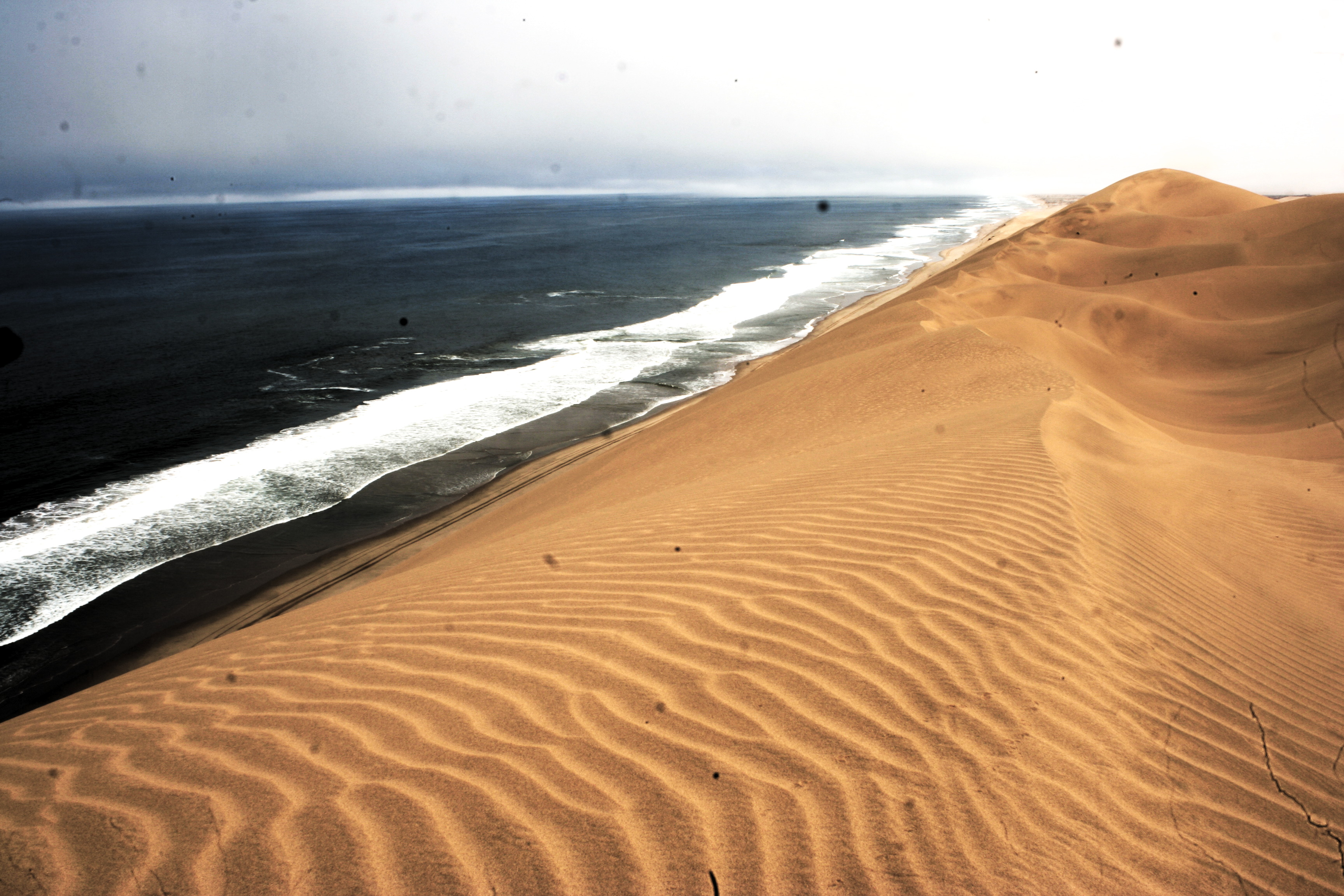
The Namibian desert's edge at Sandwich Harbour

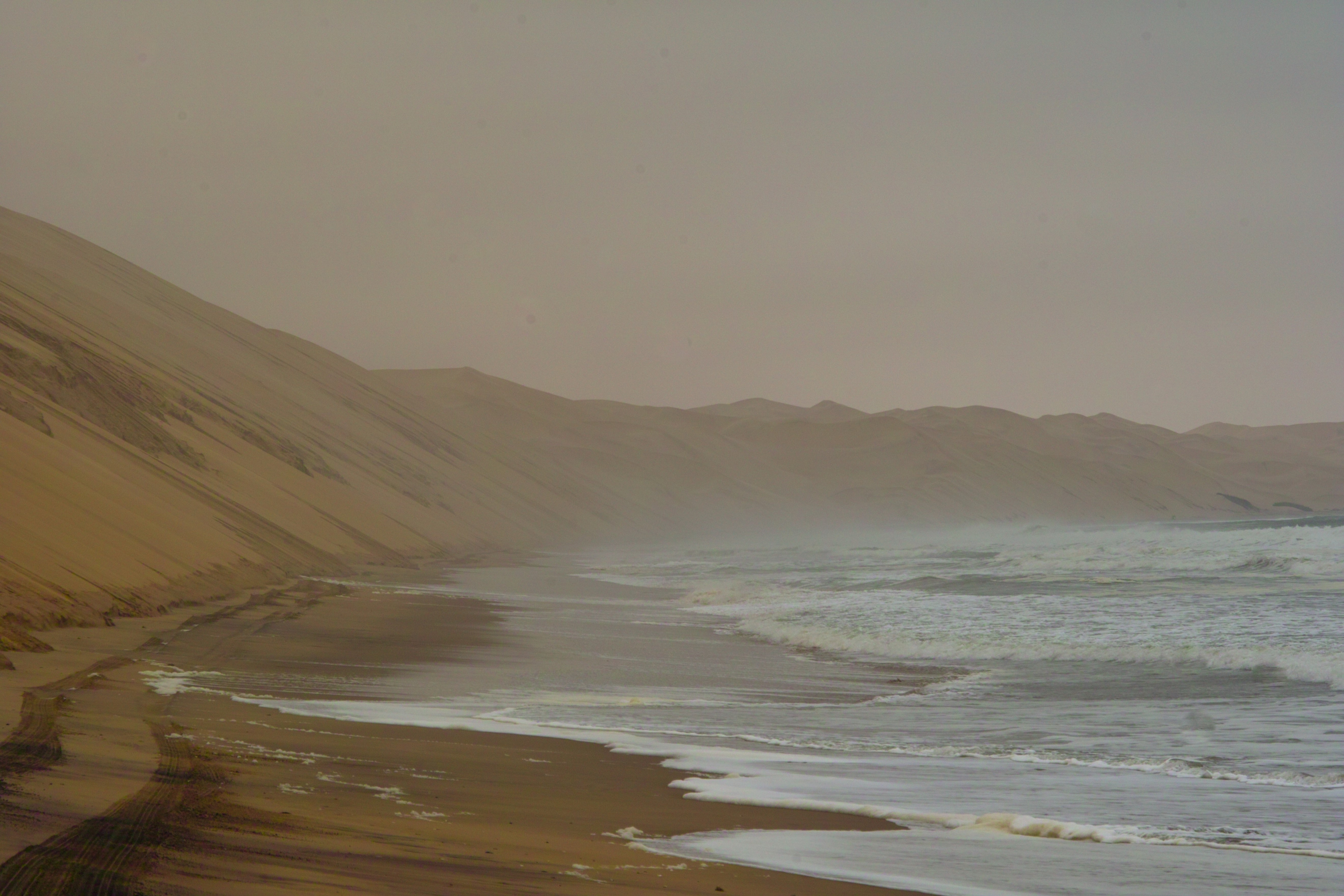
The road leading to Sandwich Harbour

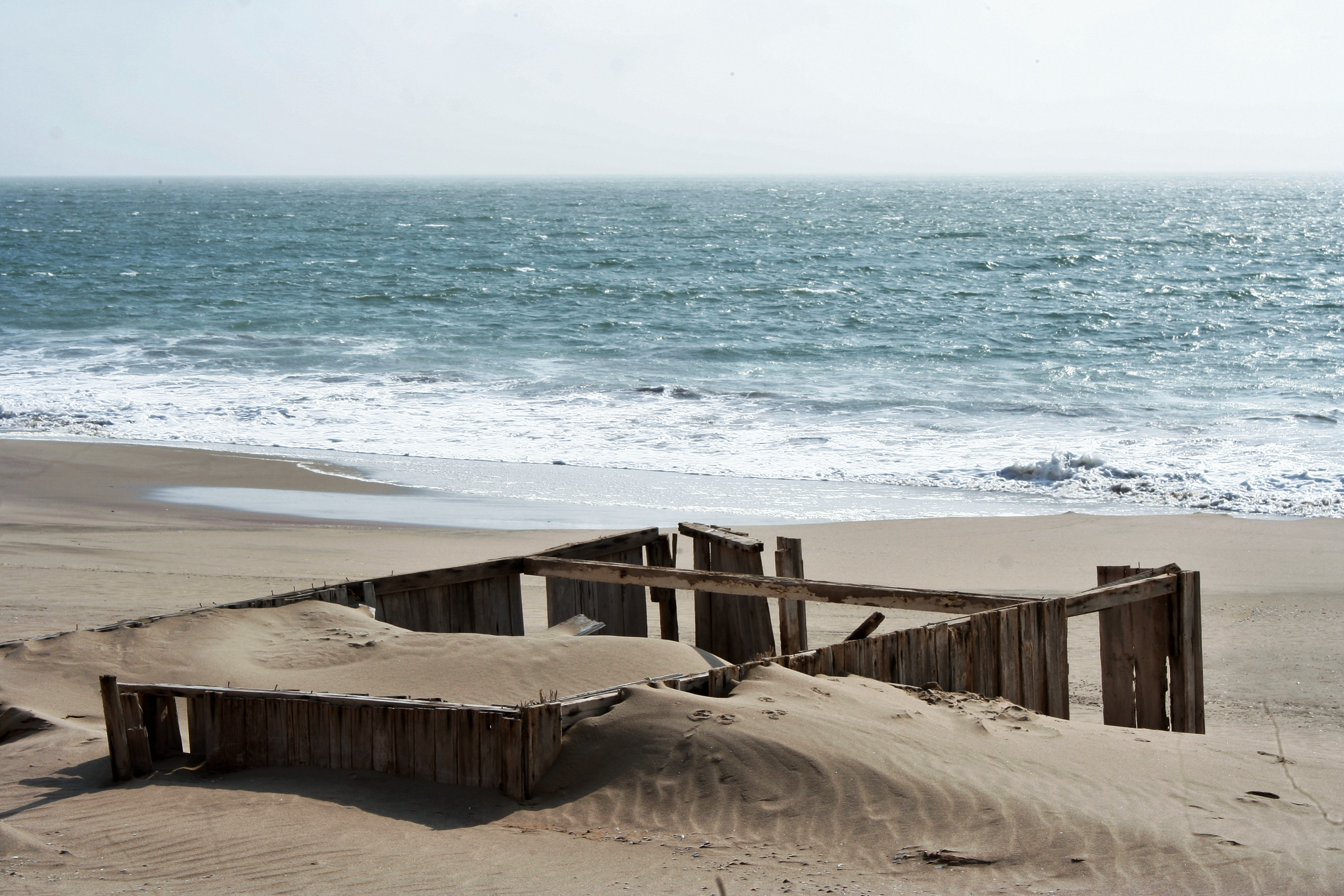
Remains of the guano factory

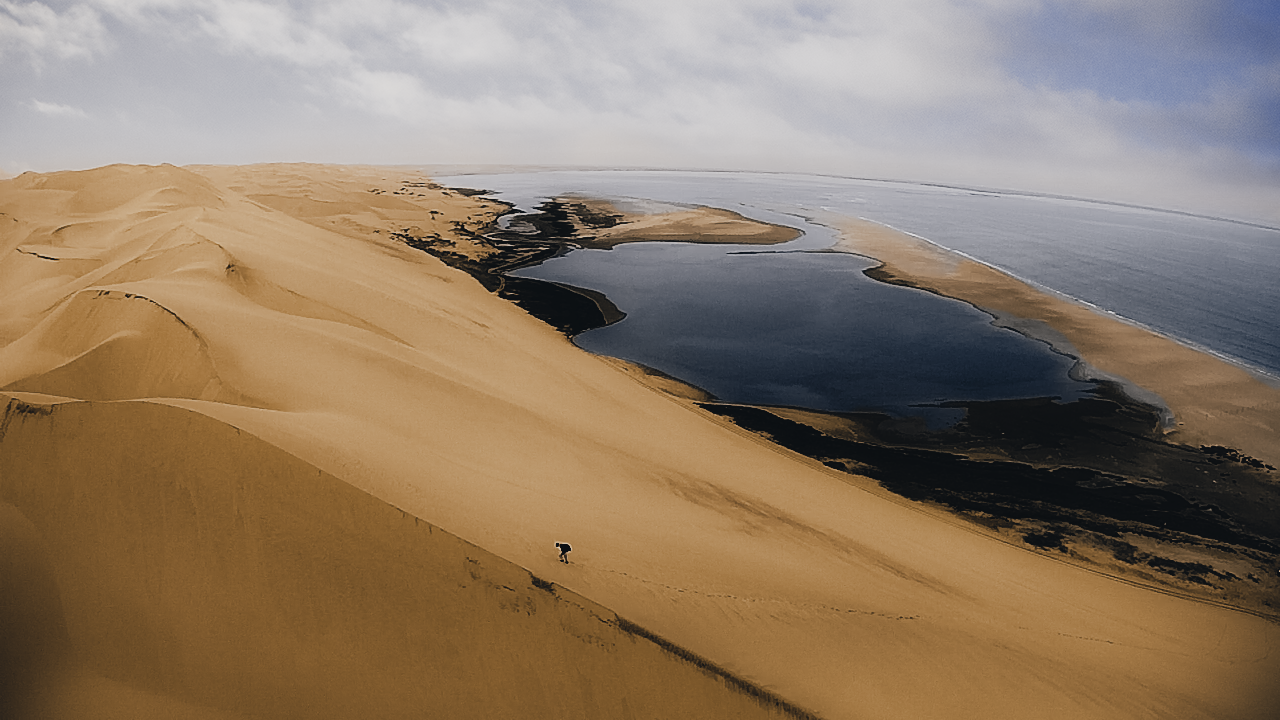
Aerial view of the Sandwich Harbour

== See also ==
- Walvis Bay
