= Namib-Naukluft National Park =

National park in Namibia

Namib-Naukluft Park, Namibia
- IUCN category II (national park)
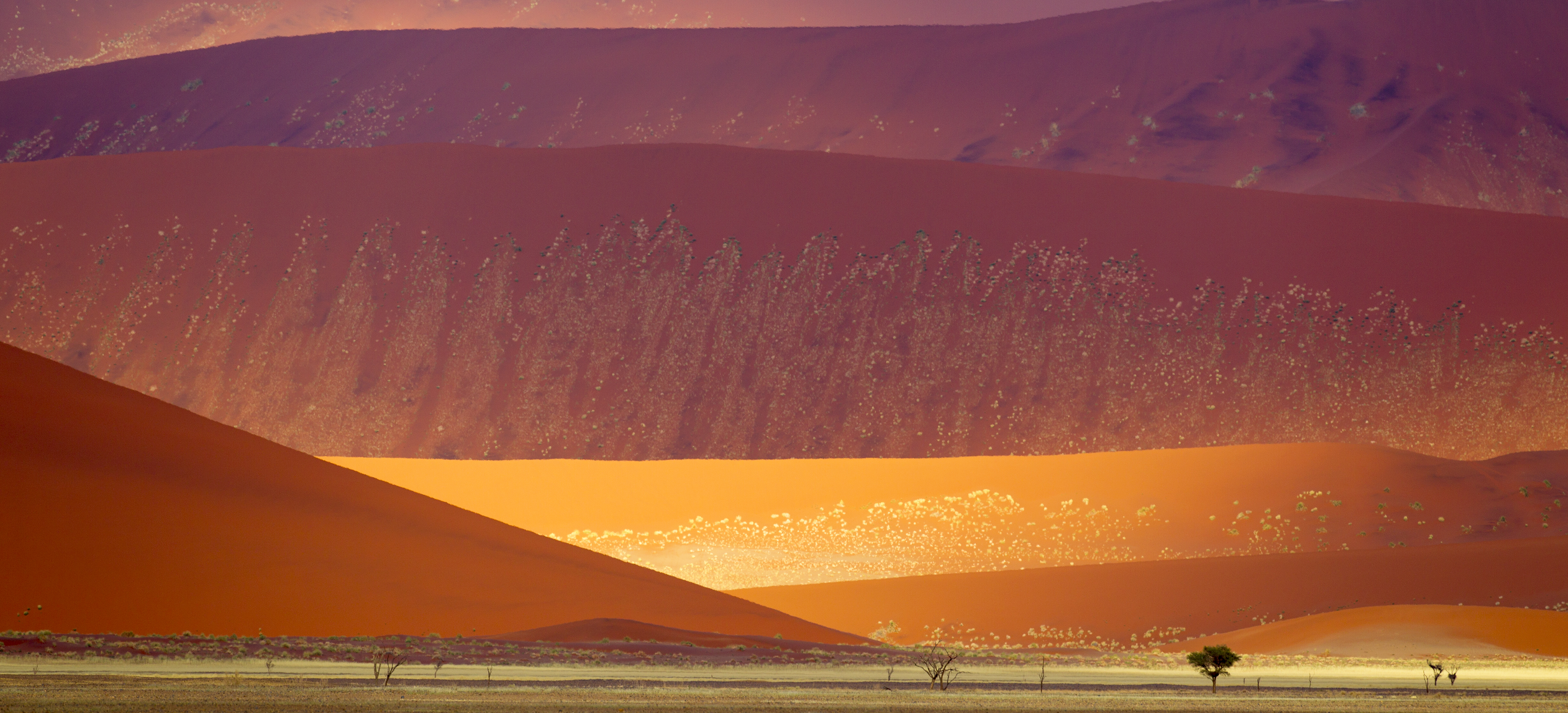
- Sand dunes near Sossusvlei

- Location within Namibia
- Interactive map of Namib-Naukluft Park, Namibia
- Location: Namibia
- Nearest city: Windhoek
- Coordinates: 24°32′47″S 15°19′47″E
- Area: 49,768 km^{2} (19,216 sq mi)
- Established: 1907
- Governing body: Ministry of Environment and Tourism

The Namib-Naukluft National Park is a national park in western Namibia, situated between the coast of the Atlantic Ocean and the edge of the Great Escarpment. It encompasses part of the Namib Desert (considered the world's oldest desert), the Naukluft mountain range, and the lagoon at Sandwich Harbour. The best-known area of the park and one of the main visitor attractions in Namibia is Sossusvlei, a clay pan surrounded by dunes, and Sesriem, a small canyon of the Tsauchab. The desert research station of Gobabeb is situated within the park.

== Location and description ==
With an overall area of 49,768 km^{2} (19,216 sq mi), the Namib-Naukluft National Park was at the time of its last expansion the largest game park in Africa and the fourth largest in the world. It consists of a strip of land on the Atlantic Ocean, including 1,609 kilometres (1,000 mi) of sea, that extends roughly 600 kilometres (370 mi) north-to-south from the Swakop River to the B4 road to Lüderitz.

== Wildlife ==
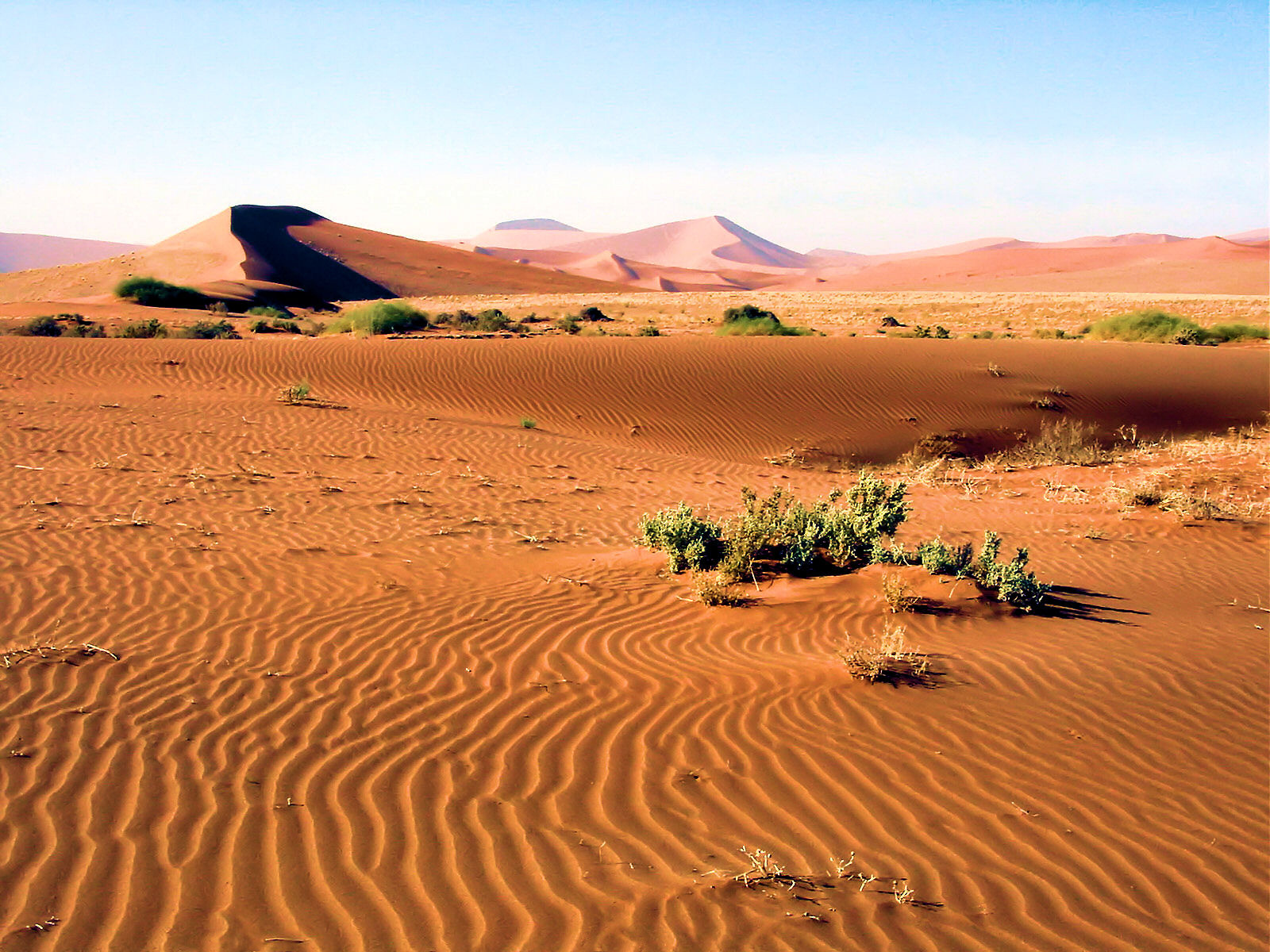
Ancient dunes near Sossusvlei, in the relatively frequently visited center of the national park, accessible by road from Sesriem.

A surprising collection of creatures survives in the hyper-arid region, including snakes, geckos, unusual insects, hyenas, gemsbok, Springbok, leopards, African wildcats, cape foxes, baboons, caracals, bat-eared foxes and jackals.

== Geography ==
The region is characterised by high, isolated inselbergs and kopjes (the Afrikaans term for rocky outcrops), made up of dramatic blood-red granites, rich in feldspars and sandstone. The easternmost part of the park covers the Naukluft Mountains.

More moisture comes in as a fog off the Atlantic Ocean than falls as rain, with the average of 106 millimeters of rainfall per year concentrated in February and April.

The winds that bring in the fog are also responsible for creating the park's towering sand dunes, whose burnt orange color is a sign of their age. The orange color develops over time as iron in the sand is oxidized, like rusty metal; the older the dune, the brighter the color.

These dunes are the tallest in the world, in places rising more than 300 meters (almost 1000 feet) above the desert floor. The dunes taper off near the coast, and lagoons, wetlands, and mudflats located along the shore attract hundreds of thousands of birds.

'Namib' means "open space", and the Namib Desert gave its name to form Namibia – "land of open spaces".

== History ==
The park was established in 1907 when the German Colonial Administration proclaimed three game reserves in German South West Africa. Today's Namib-Naukluft park was proclaimed as "Game Reserve No. 3". The other two were the Omuramba Omatako and Etosha. The northern border of the reserve was five kilometres (three miles) south of the Swakop River, and the southern border was ten kilometres (six miles) south of the Kuiseb River, so that the park included the Kuiseb but excluded the Swakop due to the economic activities at its banks. After World War I the South African administration of South West Africa confirmed the proclamation of the Germans. For the Namib-Naukluft Park, the area of Sandwich Harbour was added in 1941, and a small extension of the southern border followed in 1962.

In 1966 "Game Reserve No. 3" was deproclaimed, and the Namib Desert Park was established in its stead. The Namib Desert Park included a small area north of the Swakop River where Welwitschia grow, as well as the Moon Landscape east of Swakopmund. In 1979 two more large areas were added. The Naukluft Mountain Zebra Park was included so that the Naukluft Mountains now formed part of the protected area. It previously comprised 14 commercial farms that were bought by the government to protect the Hartmann mountain zebra. The second area added was a 1,600-kilometre (1,000 mi) strip of the Atlantic Ocean, making the Namib-Naukluft Park Namibia's first marine reserve.

The park's present boundaries were established in 1986 when the government was given control over parts of the Sperrgebiet, an area restricted for diamond mining. This vast strip of land has remained inaccessible to the general population but is now part of the Namib-Naukluft Park.

== Gallery ==
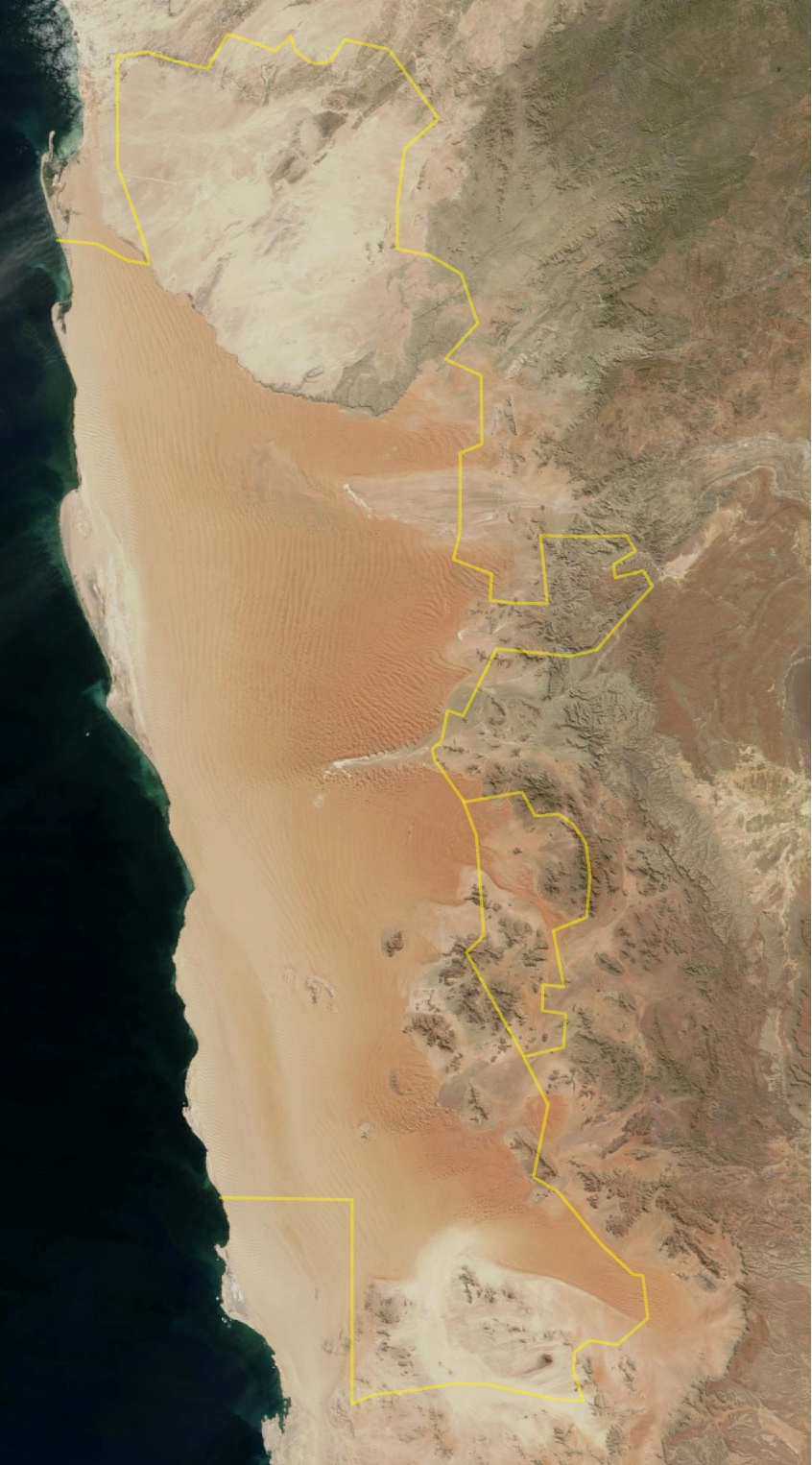
Satellite photo indicating the borders of the Namib-Naukluft National Park and the Namib Rand Nature Reserve

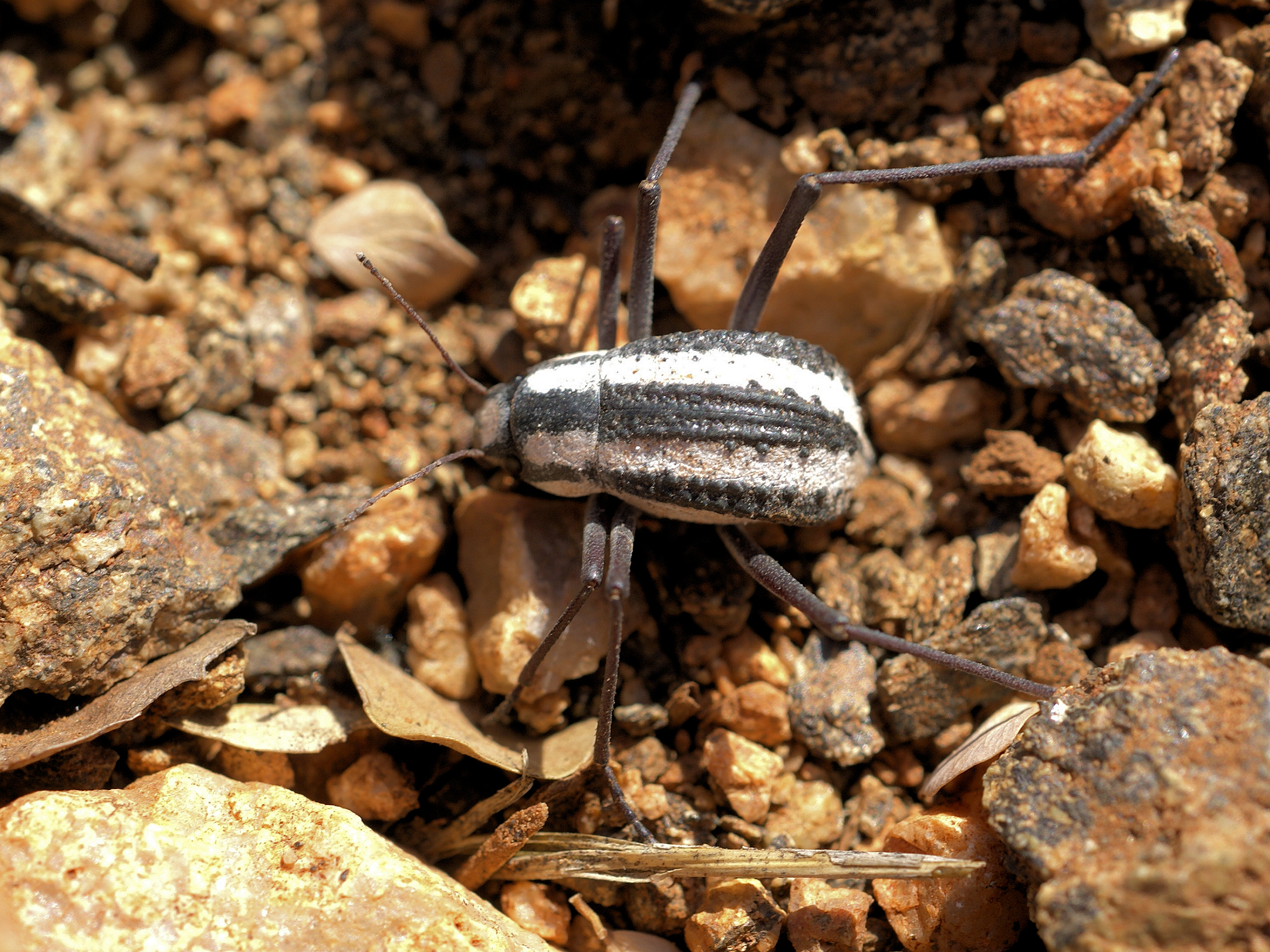
Namib desert beetle, Stenocara gracilipes

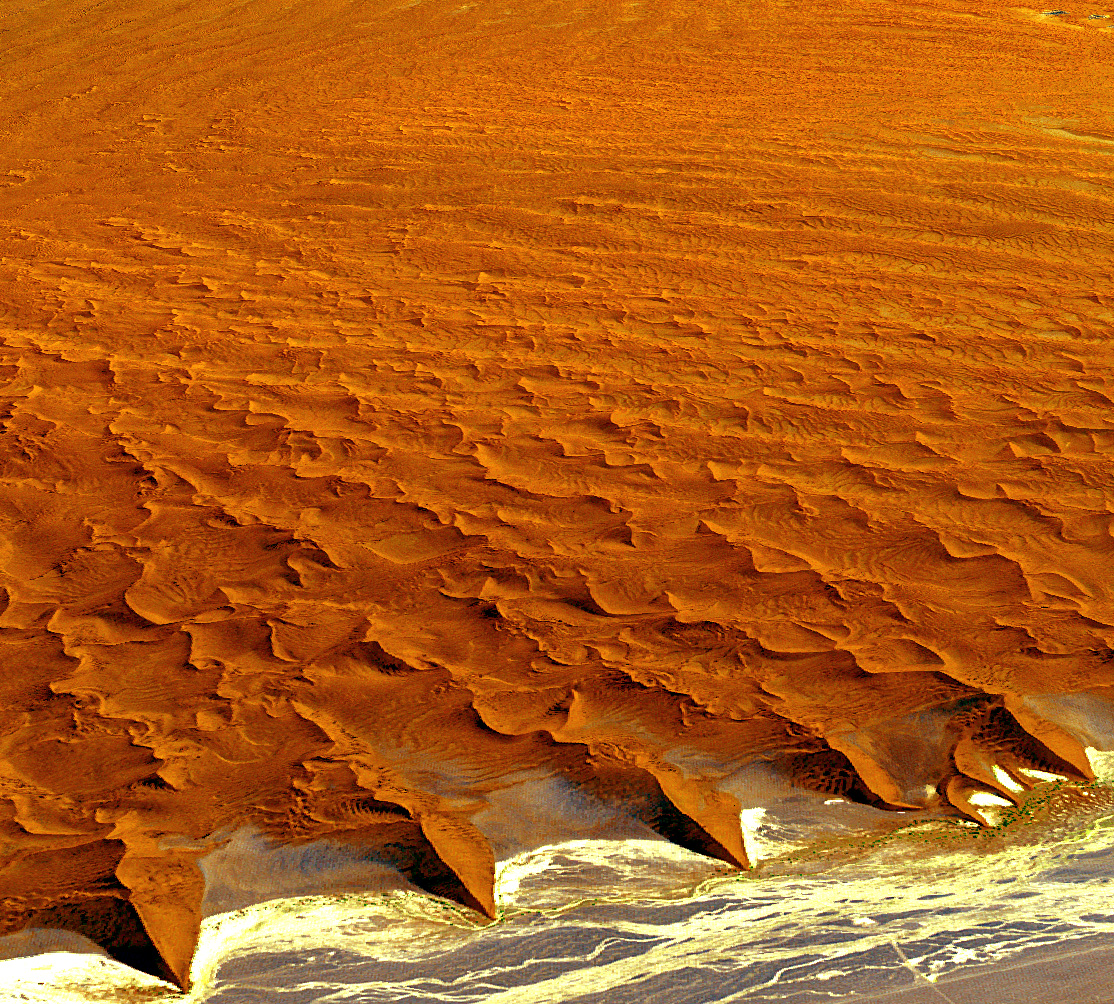
High dunes in the Namib desert

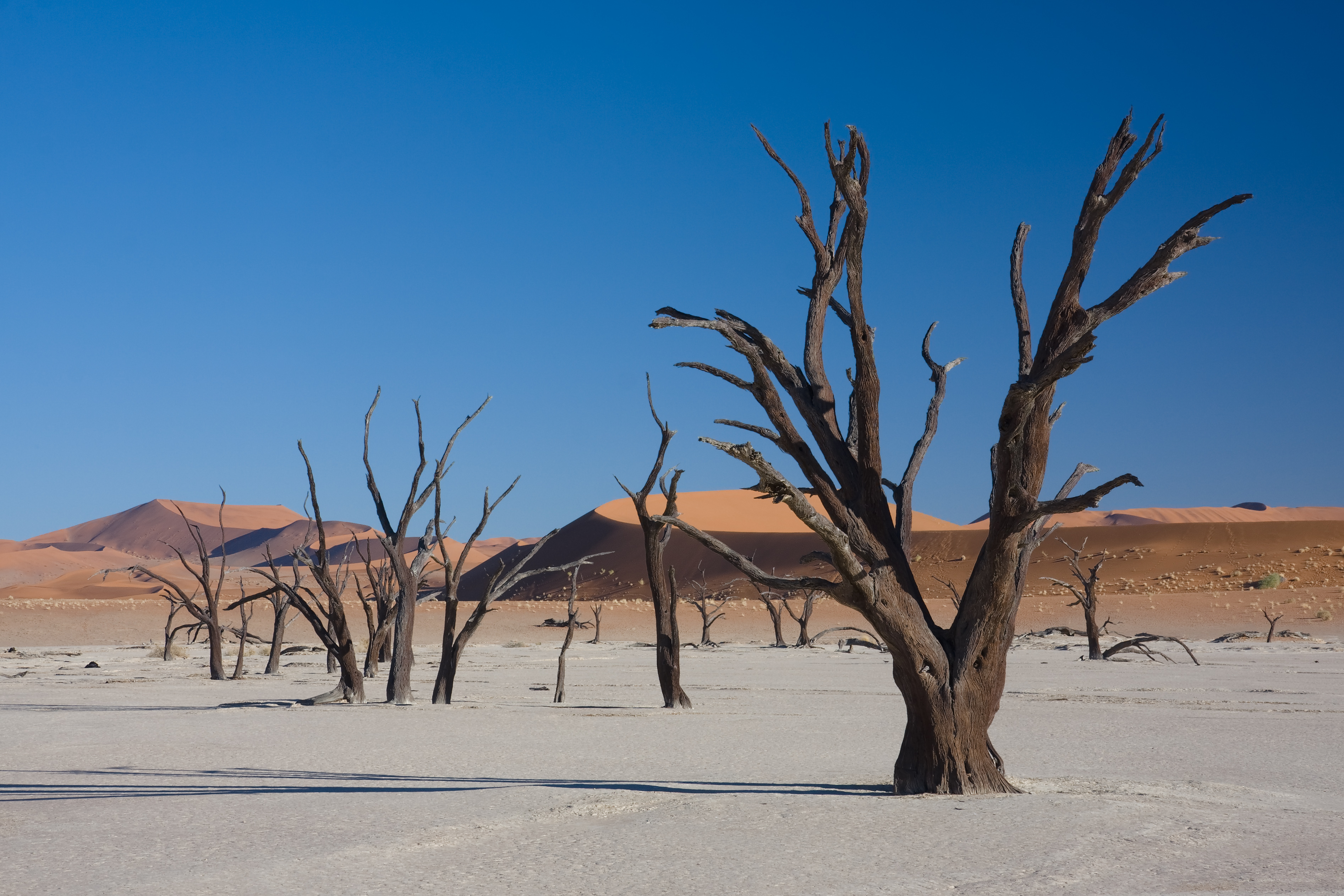
550-year-old dead trees in Dead Vlei

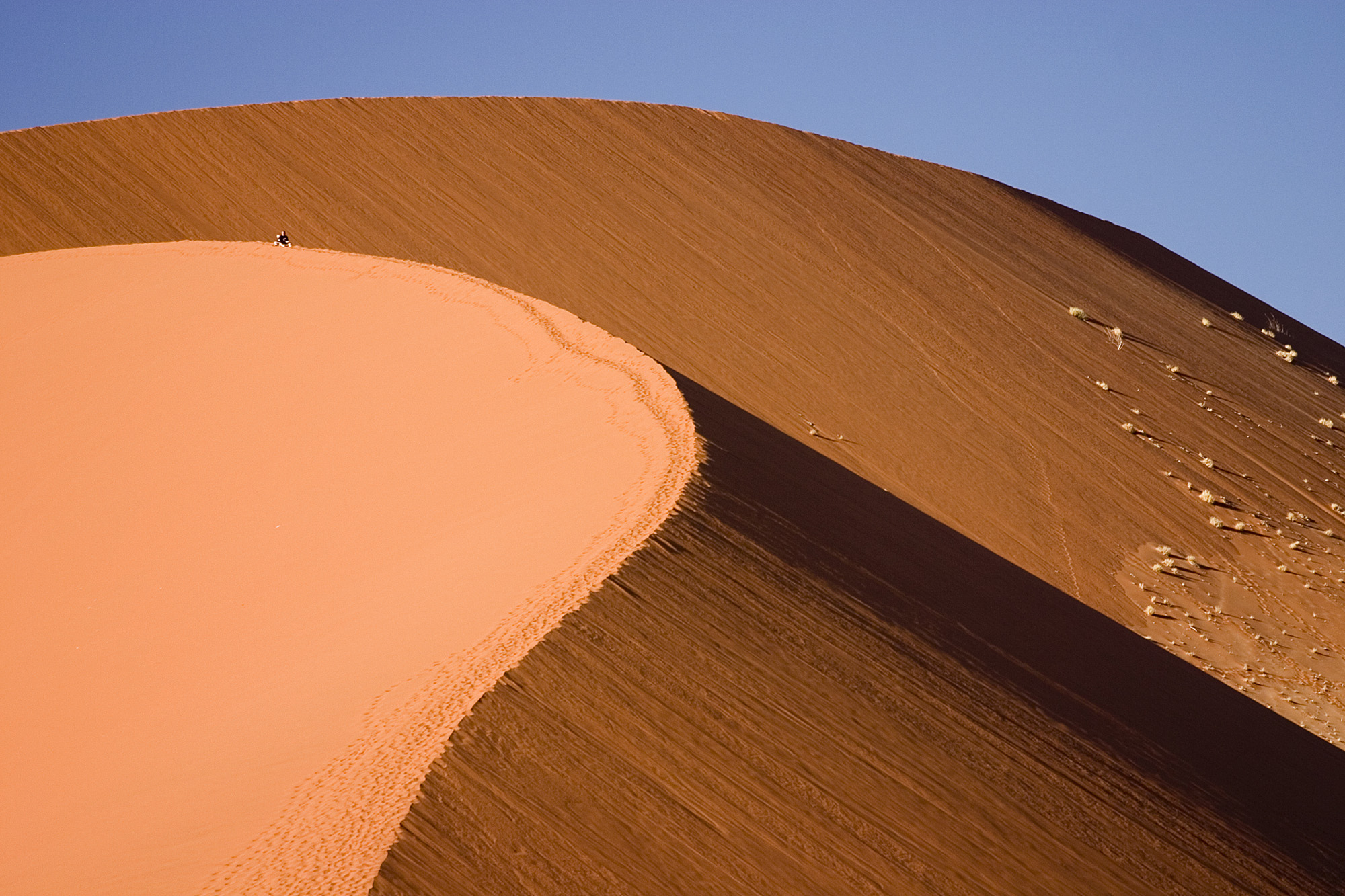
A typical dune in the park

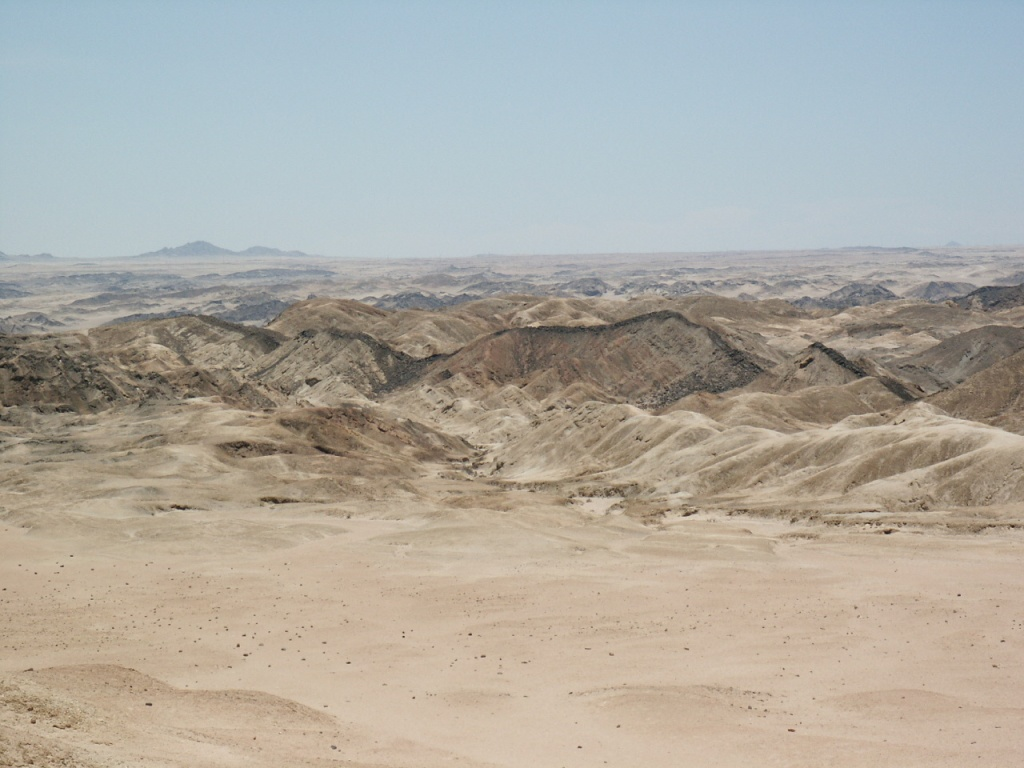
Moon landscape near Swakopmund

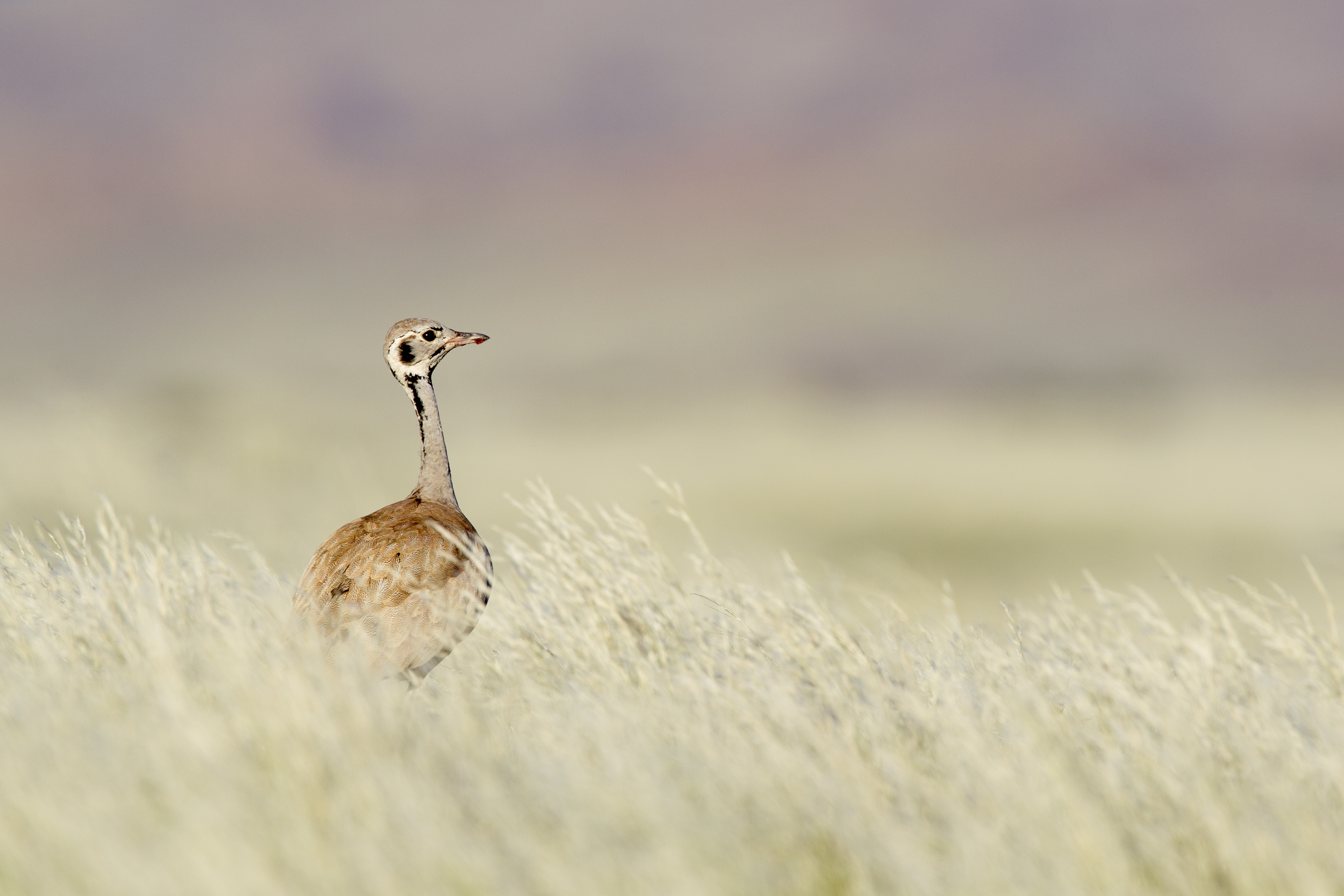
Rüppell's korhaan in the grasslands near the dunes

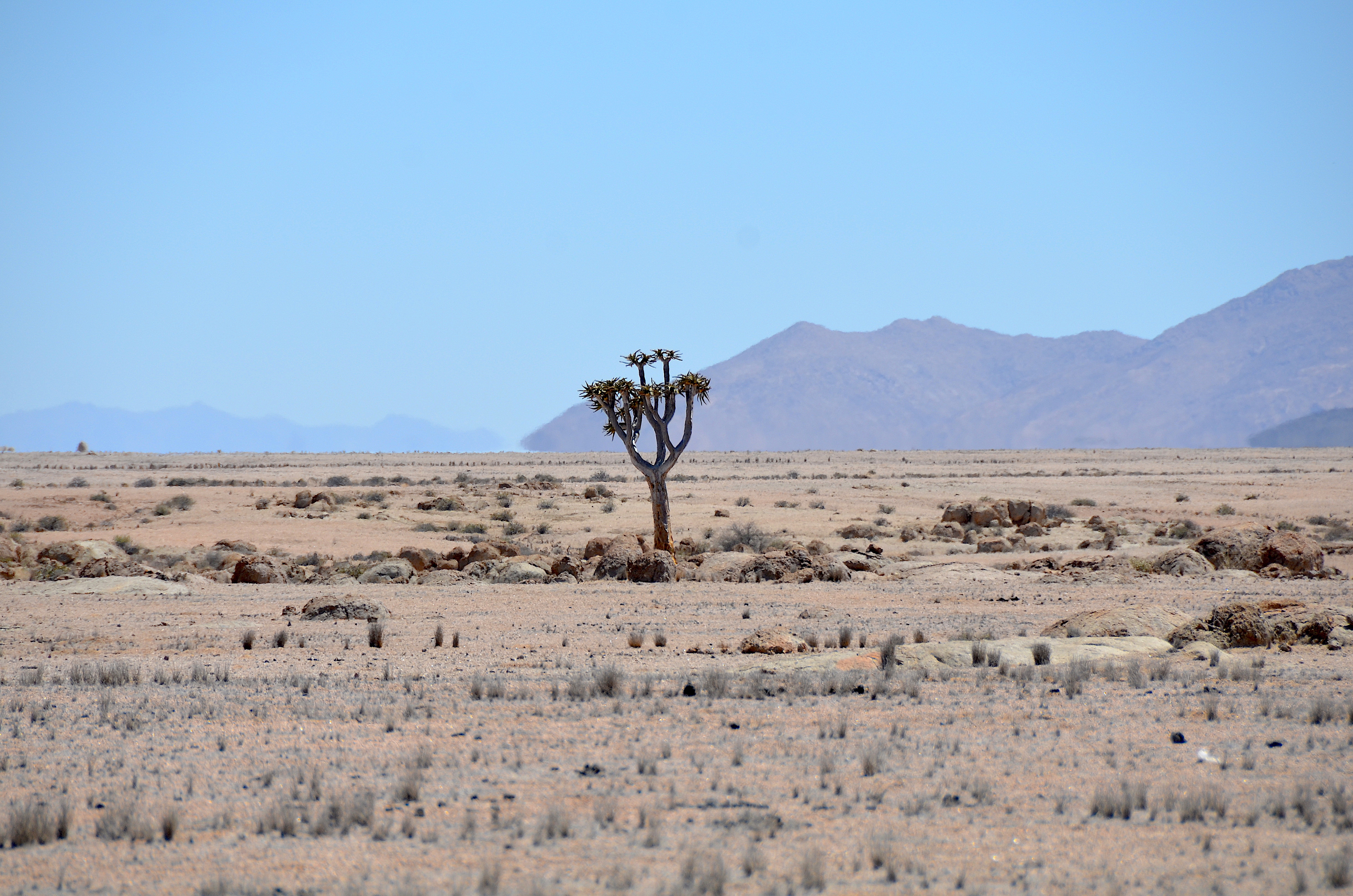
Isolated quiver tree at Namib-Naukluft Park

Dunes in the Namib-Naukluft National Park

Road to Dead Vlei in the Namib-Naukluft National Park

Namib-Naukluft National Park

Trees in the Namib-Naukluft National Park

Namib-Naukluft National Park

Road in the Namib Desert in the Namib-Naukluft National Park

== See also ==
- List of national parks of Namibia
