= Witsand =

- A beach near Witsand.

- Location within Western Cape Location within South Africa Location within Africa
- Coordinates: 34.395°S 20.841°E
- Country: South Africa
- Province: Western Cape
- District: Garden Route
- Municipality: Hessequa

Area
  - Total: 2.71 km^{2} (1.05 sq mi)

Population (2011)
  - Total: 321
  - Density: 118/km^{2} (307/sq mi)

Racial makeup (2011)
  - Black African: 9.7%
  - Coloured: 2.2%
  - White: 87.2%
  - Other: 0.9%

First languages (2011)
  - Afrikaans: 72.3%
  - English: 26.0%
  - Other: 1.6%
- Time zone: UTC+2 (SAST)
- PO box: 6666
- Area code: 028

Witsand, located in the Western Cape of South Africa, is a small coastal town at the mouth of the Breede River estuary. Often referred to as the Whale Nursery of South Africa, the town attracts a remarkable number of southern right whales between June and November each year.

As an authentic destination for water sports and outdoor enthusiasts, Witsand offers experiences such as kite-surfing, surfing, stand-up paddleboarding, and fishing. The town lies within the Hessequa region, also known as the Explorer's Garden Route.

The Breede River near Witsand is also known for yielding some of the largest bull sharks ever recorded—though notably, there have been no reported shark attacks. Each November, Witsand hosts the finish line of the annual Vlakte Marathon, a notable event in the region.

In recent years, Witsand has also gained attention as a hub for Bitcoin adoption in Africa, with many local merchants now accepting cryptocurrency payments.

== History ==
On 10 October 1831, the British colonial government granted the farm Westfield—now the site of Witsand—to Captain Benjamin Moodie. By the late 1800s, the Moodie family welcomed residents of Heidelberg, including farmers and townspeople, to holiday in Witsand, known for its excellent fishing and white sandy beach, which inspired its name. Records show the name "Witsand" was already in use by 1867.

The first structure built in the area was a small stone house called Ou Pastorie, owned by Reverend Alexander Daneel, the first pastor of the Heidelberg Dutch Reformed Church. Around 1880, holidaymakers camped in reed huts and tents, as the area had yet to be developed.

Later, Benjamin and Donald Moodie, sons of Captain Moodie, allowed fishermen to build cottages, and as interest grew, they subdivided sixty-five morgen of the farm into plots. In 1908, this area was formally registered under the name Witsand in a separate title deed. The first 118 plots were shared among 17 people, and over time, more plots were sold, forming a small village of 20 to 30 houses. Witsand was officially declared a local region in 1951.

== Water supply ==
During the tourist high-season, the population swells to over 3,000 people, leading to freshwater scarcity in the town. In 2018, the Witsand Solar Desalination Plant was constructed at a cost of R9 million (about US$605,000). The plant produces 100kl of fresh water per day powered by solar energy. This volume will supply close to 50% of the daily demand of Witsand during off-peak periods. The plant is also connected to the electrical grid. This enables the plant to be operated during peak water demand periods on a 24-hour basis, with a maximum supply capacity of 300kl per day.
