= Wlotzkasbaken =

- Peri-urban area
- Nickname: Wlotzka
- Location in Namibia
- Coordinates: 22°25′00″S 14°27′00″E

Population (2010)
  - Total: 6 (permanent)
- Time zone: UTC+1 (South African Standard Time)

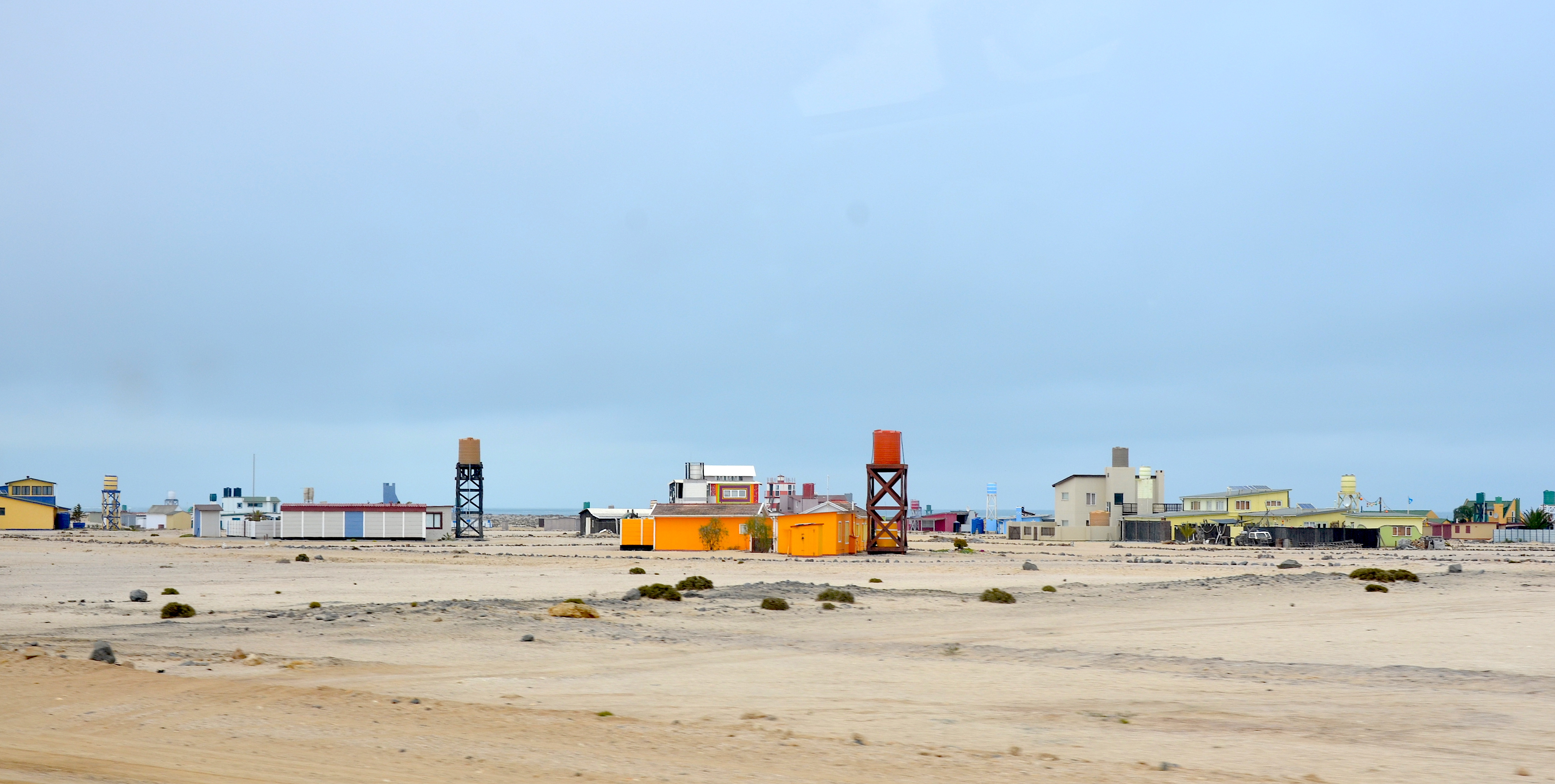
Wlotzkasbaken, Namibia (2014)

Wlotzkasbaken or Wlotzka's Baken (German: Wlotzka's beacon, often shortened to Wlotzka or Wlotzkas) is a holiday settlement on Namibia's Atlantic coast, situated approximately halfway between Swakopmund and Hentiesbay. The area around the village lies within the Dorob National Park and features extensive lichen colonies.

Founded as a holiday angling spot in the 1930s, Wlotzkasbaken developed into a settlement of unusual design and administration. Without any fences or boundary walls, privacy is achieved only by the distance between the houses. Titles in the village are held by the Regional Council and only leased to the residents. A legal battle ensued about how to expand the resort without disadvantaging lessees who built houses on land they do not own.

As the expansion of Wlotzkasbaken stopped in the 1970s when recreational developments were exclusively for Whites, it currently still has no residents of previously disadvantaged population groups.

== History ==
The place is named after a trigonometrical beacon, the only one that remained from a land survey along the Skeleton Coast in the 1930s. Paul Wlotzka (1870-1942), a member of the surveying team, chose this place to erect a storage structure to support his frequent horse cart rides between Swakopmund and Hentiesbay. He soon discovered that the coastal waters boast an abundance of fish which he caught and sold. His bragging about the find soon lured more anglers who pitched temporary structures during holidays since approximately 1936.

In 1955, 87 erven were surveyed and leased to holiday makers. Later this number was increased to 110. Wlotzkasbaken was proclaimed a peri-urban area in 1972, and a village in 1992. A Government Notice from 1993 converted it back to a settlement area, denying the establishment of a Village Council for self-governance. The place is thus still under the direct jurisdiction of the Regional Council of the Erongo Region, a situation that has been described as a "burden".

== Geography ==
Wlotzkasbaken is situated on the coast of the Atlantic Ocean approximately 30 km north of Swakopmund. The main road C34 runs past the village. Excluding the village itself, the entire area is part of Dorob, Namibia's eighth and newest National Park. In the vicinity of Wlotzkasbaken the extensive lichen fields are of particular ecological importance. A large community of Teloschistes lichenised fungi is situated 4 km north of the village.

Only a few of its residents permanently live in Wlotzkasbaken, while during the holiday months of December and January several hundred people stay here, and the annual "Marterpfahl" (literally German: torture stake) angling festival between Christmas and New Year's Eve lures several thousand visitors to the sleepy village.

Wlotzkasbaken is not supplied with permanent electricity and not connected to the public water system. Water is delivered by road and stored in private water towers that gives a unique character to the settlement's skyline. There are 106 houses which were all designed and built by their owners. Every household is self-sustaining with regards to water and electricity. Privacy is achieved by the large distances between the houses. There are no walls or fences; boundaries are demarcated with rocks. The village thus features a unique type of settlement in Namibia and has even received some international attention because of this.

Close to the village Namibia's first desalination plant was opened in April 2010. The plant supplies water to the Trekkopje uranium mine 65 km north-east of Swakopmund.

== Land dispute ==
Originally, land parcels in Wlotzkasbaken were leased for 99 years. The contracts were changed several times over the years, with the lease period reduced to ten years at first, and in 1972, along with the proclamation as peri-urban area, to only one year. Plans to develop the area into a holiday town and prime tourist destination comprising 2,800 separate properties led to a multitude of lawsuits between the Wlotzkasbaken Home Owners Association and the Erongo Regional Council. An agreement was reached in 2000 to expand the number of erven to 248, giving the existing lessees the option to buy the piece of land they had rented and developed. An attempt to change the conditions of this agreement went to the Namibian Supreme Court and was decided in favour of the owners.

History and structure of the settlement—most prominently the situation that its last expansion occurred before Namibian independence and the abolition of apartheid—have led to accusations that the community of Wlotzkasbaken intentionally keeps black Namibians out of the holiday village. On the other hand, Government has been accused of planning the distribution of 28 seafront properties to benefit high-ranking Government officials, and of deliberately intending to spoil the unique character of the settlement. The homogenous character of the village and its special community rules have evoked some mockery; causing it sometimes to be called the "Free Republic of Wlotzkasbaken" in jest.
