= NamWater =

State water company in Namibia

The Namibia Water Corporation or NamWater is a state-owned enterprise in Namibia. Its headquarters are in the capital city Windhoek. NamWater was registered on 9 December 1997 (28 years ago) as successor of the South West Africa Water and Electricity Commission (SWAWEC). It is wholly owned by the Government of Namibia; Its operations are overseen by the Ministry of Agriculture, Water and Land Reform. In 2018 they employed 594 people.

NamWater operates as a commercial entity, supplying water in bulk to industries, municipalities, and the Directorate of Rural Water Supply within the Ministry of Agriculture, Water, and Land Reform. As of recent updates, the company employs a total of 648 permanent staff members, comprising 192 females and 456 males. Its critical role involves ensuring the availability and equitable distribution of water resources across Namibia, supporting both urban and rural communities.

On the 11th June 2026 the Honorable Minister of Agriculture, fisheries, water and land reform Mrs. Inge Zaamwani-Kamwi officially inaugurated a new board of directors chaired by Matty Hauuanga.
