= Water supply and sanitation in Namibia =

Data
- Water coverage (broad definition): (improved water source) Total: 91%; Urban: 98%; Rural: 85% (2015)
- Sanitation coverage (broad definition): (improved sanitation) Total: 34%; Urban: 54%; Rural: 17% (2015)
- Continuity of supply: mostly continuous
- Average urban water use (L/person/day): 163 (2010 in Windhoek)
- Average urban water and sanitation tariff (US$/m^{3}): 0.92 (2016 in Windhoek for the first consumption block for residential users)
- Share of household metering: very high
- Annual investment in WSS: 80 US$ per capita

Institutions
- Decentralization to municipalities: Complete
- National water and sanitation company: NamWater
- Responsibility for policy setting: Ministry of Agriculture, Water and Forestry through its Department of Water Affairs
- Sector law: Water Resources Management Act, 2013 (No. 11 of 2013)
- No. of urban service providers: 1 Bulk Water Supply Company (NamWater), 13 cities and 26 towns

Namibia is an arid country that is regularly afflicted by droughts. Large rivers flow only along its northern and southern borders, but they are far from the population centers. They are also far from the country's mines, which are large water users. In order to confront this challenge, the country has built dams to capture the flow from ephemeral rivers, constructed pipelines to transport water over large distances, pioneered potable water reuse in its capital Windhoek located in the central part of Namibia, and built Sub-Saharan Africa's first large seawater desalination plant to supply a uranium mine and the city of Swakopmund with water. A large scheme to bring water from the Okavango River in the North to Windhoek, the Eastern National Water Carrier, was only partially completed during the 1980s.

Most urban residents have access to drinking water supply, but access lags behind in rural areas. Access to sanitation also considerably lags behind access to drinking water supply. The bulk water supply infrastructure is owned by NamWater, a public entity operating under commercial principles. It sells water to the mining companies, as well as to the municipalities which in turn sell it to urban residents and businesses.

== Water resources ==
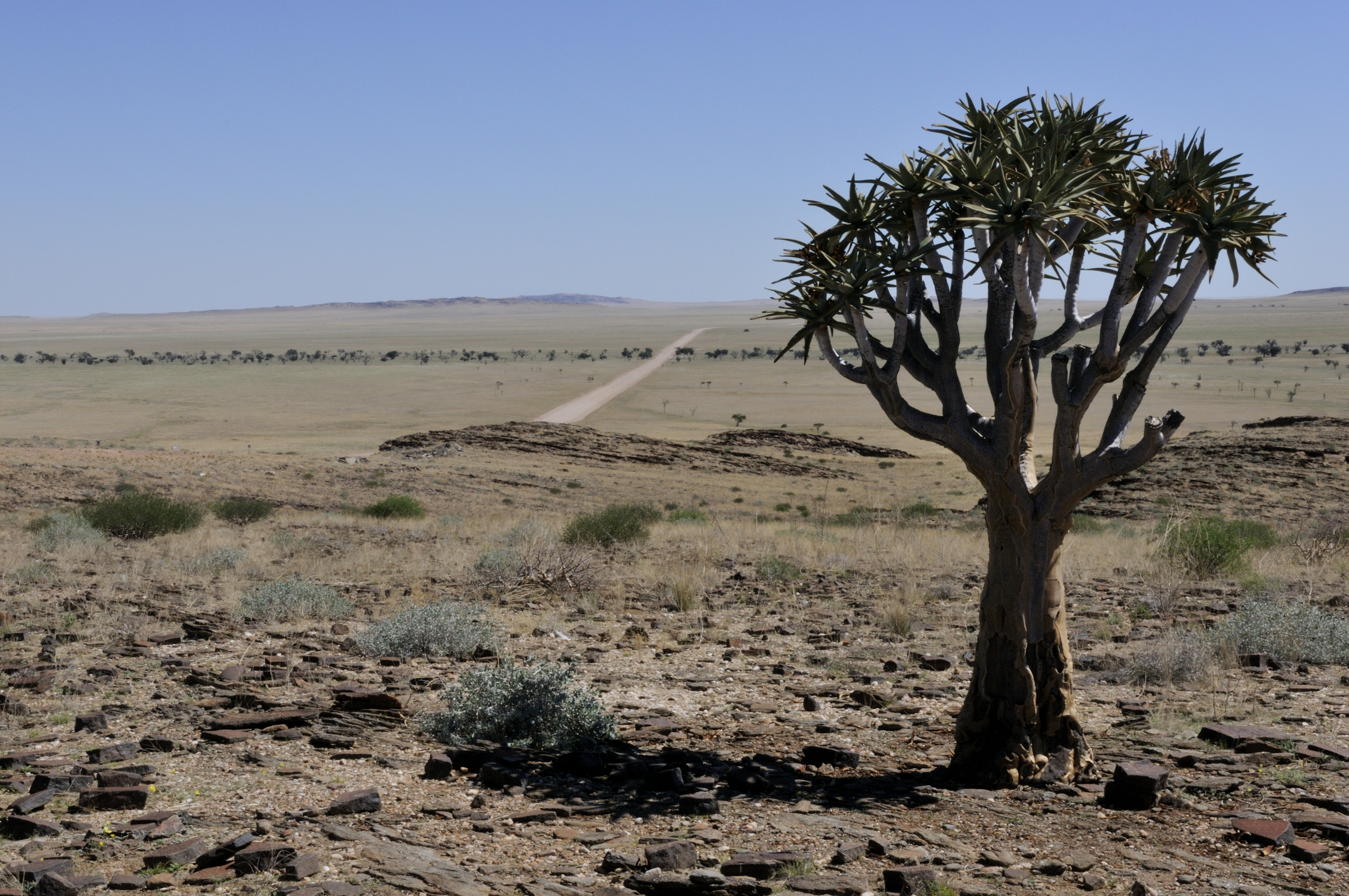
Namibia is primarily a large desert and semi-desert plateau.

Namibia's climate is hot and dry with erratic rainfall during two rainy seasons in summer. Within Africa its climate is second in aridity only to the Sahara. Namibia shares several large rivers, such as the Orange River in the South, shared with South Africa, as well as the Zambezi and Okavango Rivers in the North, shared with Angola, Zambia and Botswana. But these rivers are far away from the population centers and the cost of tapping them for drinking water supply is prohibitive. Only the Cunene River, which is shared with Angola, provides drinking water for four Northern regions of Namibia. The total average "safe yield" of Namibia's water resources is estimated at 660 million m^{3}/year, distributed as follows: groundwater 300 million m^{3}/year, ephemeral rivers 200 million m^{3}/year, perennial rivers 150 million m^{3}/year and unconventional sources such as treated wastewater 10 million m^{3}/year.

=== Groundwater ===
Groundwater is distributed unevenly over the territory of Namibia, thus making the construction of pipelines necessary to tap their potential. In particular, the coastal area is nearly devoid of groundwater. Recharge in these areas is low and unreliable, groundwater lies at great depths and sometimes is of poor quality. Other areas are favorable, sitting on high-yielding, very productive aquifers that contain more water than farmers and communities presently need. Numerous small springs throughout the country sustain wildlife, man and livestock. Over the past century, more than 100 000 boreholes have been drilled in Namibia. Half of these are still in operation. In 2012 hydro-geologists discovered a huge aquifer in Northern Namibia that could supply the area, where 40% of the population of the country lives, for 400 years. The aquifer, called Ohangwena II, contains about 5 billion cubic meters of water which is up to 10,000 years old. The aquifer is about 300 meters deep and is under pressure, so that its water could be pumped up at a relatively low cost. However, a saline aquifer sits on top of the freshwater aquifer, so that drilling must be done carefully in order to avoid saline intrusion. The aquifer receives some recharge from Angola in the North. Experts recommend that, during normal climatic conditions, water abstraction should be limited to the inflow from the North in order to manage the aquifer on a sustainable basis. However, during extended droughts induced by climate change, the aquifer can be drawn down and serve as an important buffer against drought.

In some areas, groundwater is slightly saline (brackish). In the Omusati Region in Northern Namibia, four small brackish water desalination plants were installed in 2010 as part of the German-Namibian research project CuveWaters. The plants are powered by solar energy and provide between 0.5 and 3.3 m^{³} of safe drinking water per day, enough to satisfy the basic needs of between 10 and 66 people. At 15 Euro/m^{3} the cost of desalinating brackish water in these small plants is very high.

=== Surface water ===
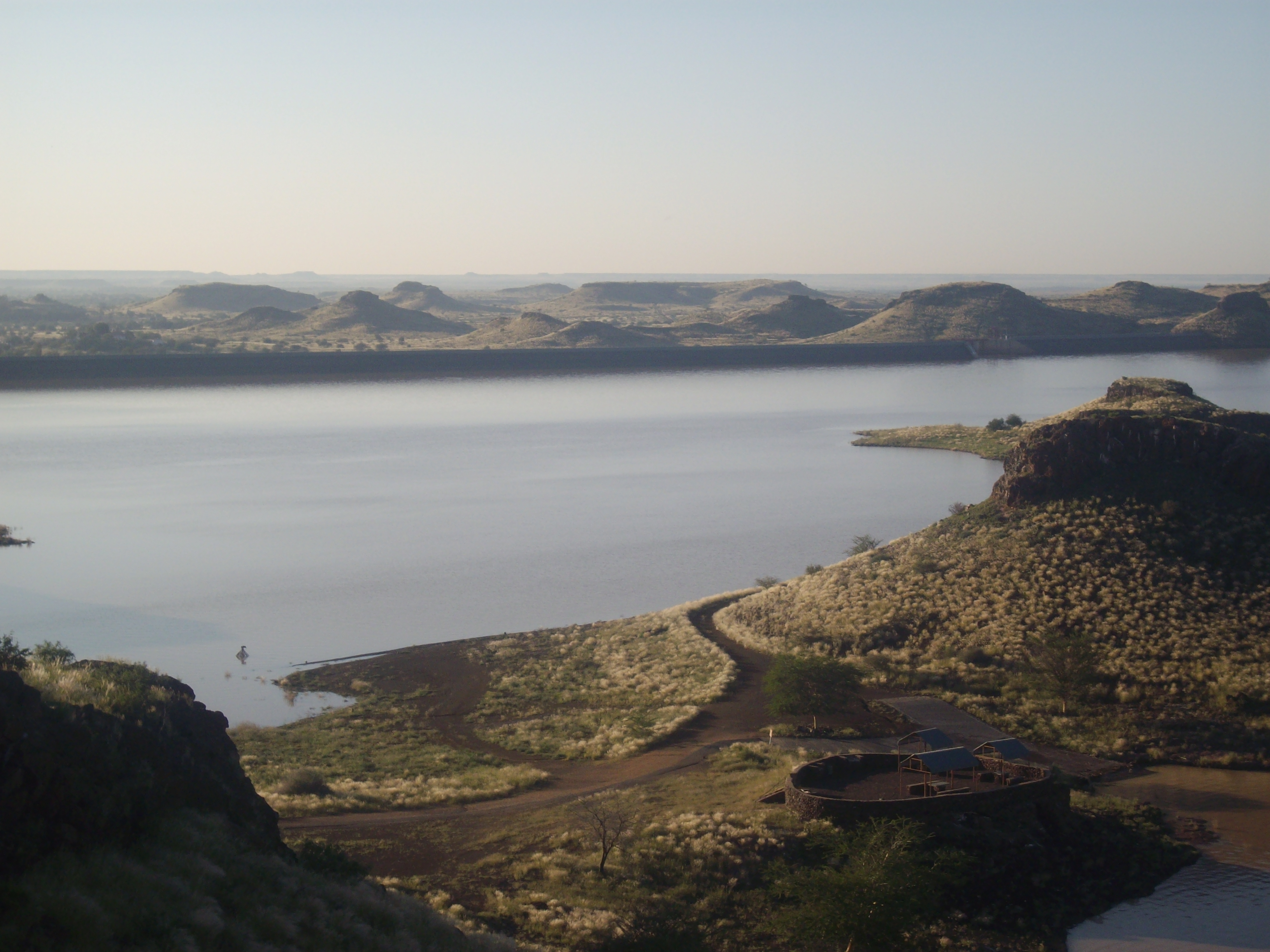
The reservoir of the Hardap Dam on the ephemeral Fish River in Southern Namibia is the largest in the country.

Many of the ephemeral (seasonally flowing) rivers of the Namibian interior are dammed and, according to the FAO, provide a 95%-assured yield of 96 million m^{3}/year, based on historical rainfall data. These dams have low safe yields in comparison to their total volume, because of uneven flows over time and high evaporation losses. Thus only about half the water from ephemeral rivers is usable. There is surplus water in some dams, e.g. in the Oanob Dam, the Hardap Dam, the Naute Dam and the Friedenau Dam. This surplus water cannot be used because of the remote location of these dams and the comparatively limited local demand.

Namibia suffers from regular droughts, the most recent one hitting the country in 2019.

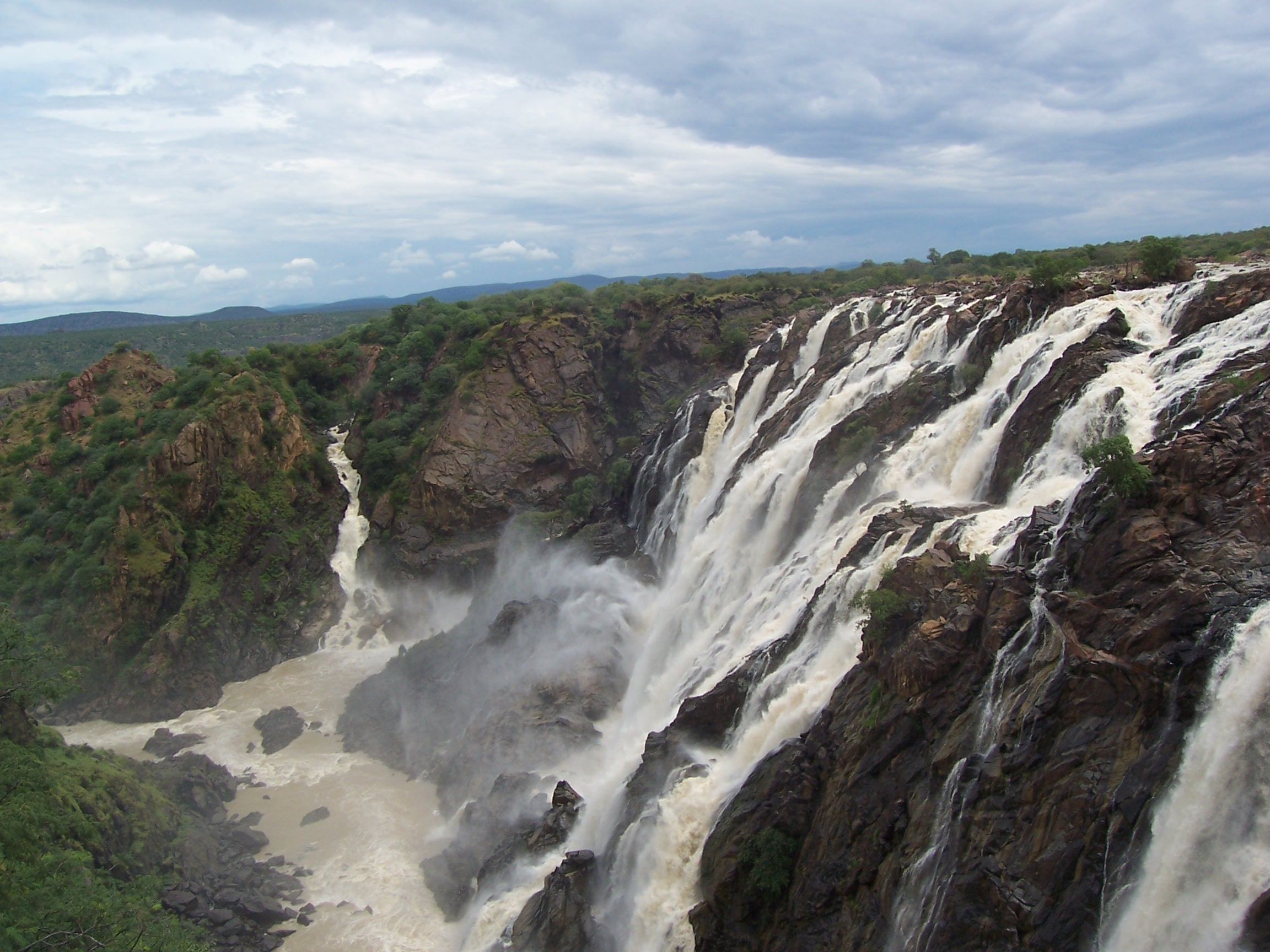
The Cunene River, shown here at the Ruacana Falls at the Namibian-Angolan border, is an important water source for Northern Namibia.

The water from perennial (permanently flowing) rivers used in Namibia corresponds to the small share of Namibia in its border rivers. The actual abstractions as of 1999 (latest available data) were 23 million m^{3} from the Cunene River at Ruacana, 49 million m^{3} from the Orange River at Noordoewer, 22 million m^{3} from the Okavango River (that flows through Namibia in the Caprivi Strip) at Rundu, and 7 million m^{3} from the Zambezi River. Namibia has agreements in place with Angola and South Africa about the sharing of the Cunene and Orange Rivers respectively. The water allocation from the Cunene River is 180 million m^{3} and thus far larger than the amount withdrawn.

=== Flood and rainwater harvesting ===
In Northern Namibia rain is relatively abundant, but it falls only during the rainy season, creating temporary natural ponds called Oshanas. At the height of the rainy season the water in these ponds is clear and of good quality. In a pilot project as part of the CuveWaters research program, in the remote village Lipopo in the Southern Oshana region water from an Oshana has been pumped to a storage tank to be used for the irrigation of vegetables during the dry season using a drip irrigation system. In addition, rainwater is being collected from the rooftop of a greenhouse and from the roofs covering the storage ponds. In another village, Epyeshona near Oshakati, only rainwater is collected, both on an individual basis from the rooftops of houses, and on a communal basis from a concrete area on the ground constructed especially for rainwater harvesting. In both cases the water is used for the irrigation of vegetables during the dry season, either in an open field or in a communal greenhouse.

=== Seawater desalination ===
The first large desalination plant in Sub-Saharan Africa was inaugurated by Areva on the 16 April 2010. The Erongo plant is located near Wlotzkasbaken, 30 km north of Swakopmund. Its maximum capacity is 20 million m^{3} per year but it will initially supply 13 million m^{3}. Its primary purpose was to supply the uranium mine at Trekkopje, located 48 kilometres (30 mi) inland. The Trekkopje mine however never opened due to persistent low uranium prices, hence the plant has a contract to sell water to state-owned service provider Namwater and provides some of the water requirements for the town of Swakopmund. During the 2016 drought Areva offered to sell its plant to the Namibian government for US$200 million.

=== Water reuse ===
Reuse of treated wastewater is practiced in Namibia in many urban areas such as Swakopmund, Walvis Bay, Tsumeb, Otjiwarongo, Okahandja, Mariental, Oranjemund and Windhoek. In most localities, water is reused for irrigation. In Windhoek, reclaimed water is also used for potable uses. Windhoek has been using recovered water for fifty years. Approximately 30% of the city's 400 000 residents' present drinking water supply is made up of reclaimed water. A representative example of direct potable reuse is the case of Windhoek (Namibia, New Goreangab Water Reclamation Plant (NGWRP)), where treated wastewater has been blended with drinking water for more than 45 years. It is based on the multiple treatment barriers concept (i.e. pre-ozonation, enhanced coagulation/dissolved air flotation/rapid sand filtration, and subsequent ozone, biological activated carbon/granular activated carbon, ultrafiltration (UF), chlorination) to reduce associated risks and improve the water quality. Since the year 1968 the capital of Namibia, Windhoek, has used reclaimed wastewater as one of their drinking water sources, which nowadays represent about 14% of the city's drinking water production. In 2001, the New Goreangab Reclamation Plant (NGWRP) was built by the City of Windhoek and it started to deliver drinking water in 2002 (about 21,000 m^{3} of water per day).

There is also a pilot project for small-scale reuse of treated wastewater in rural areas in Outapi in Northern Namibia as part of the CuveWaters research project. The wastewater of 1,500 people is collected in vacuum sewers and treated in such a way that pathogens are removed, but nutrients remain to a large extent in the water. The technology is relatively sophisticated for a rural area in a developing country, using upflow anaerobic sludge blanket digestion followed by aerobic treatment using a rotating biological contactor, a microsieve and ultraviolet disinfection. The water is then used to irrigate vegetables for the local market. Community members have been trained in how to operate the facilities and a tariff and billing system has been introduced to recover the operating costs of the plant from users.

=== Water use and access ===
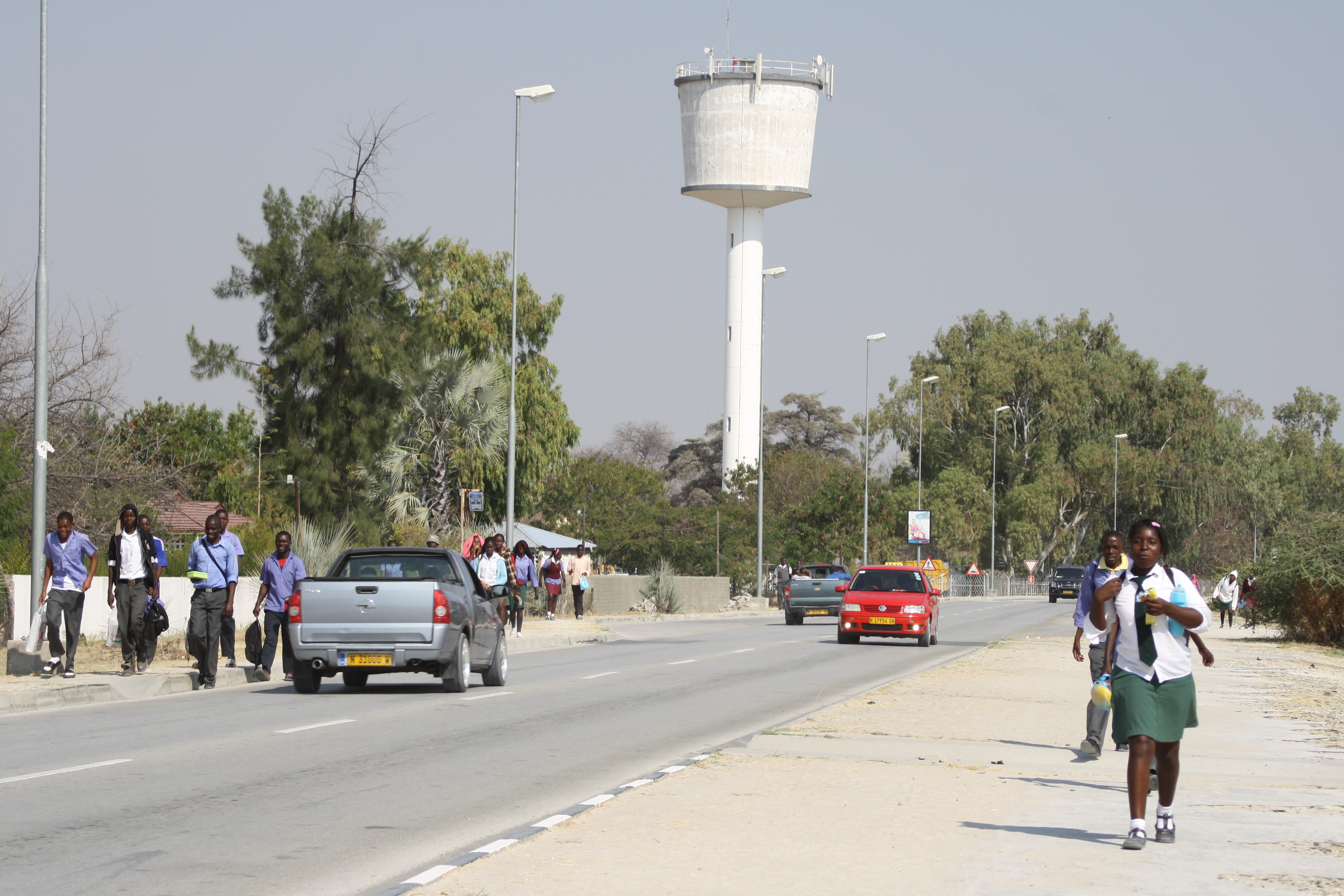
Water tower in the town of Ongwediva in Northern Namibia.

Total water use in Namibia was estimated at 300 million m^{3} in 2000. The municipal sector including tourism and industry used 73 million m^{3} (24 percent), while the bulk of water use is for agriculture and livestock. Only 13 million m^{3} (4 percent) was used in mining at the time, although this amount has increased due to the development of mining – in particular uranium mining – after 2000. Mining in Namibia makes extensive use of water, which is used for a broad range of activities including in particular mineral processing, but also dust control, slurry transport and the water use of employees. Uranium mining uses large quantities of water for processing using alkali heap leaching. For example, the Trekkopje mine in the Namib desert uses 14 million m^{3}/year of high-quality water that must be free of any salt. Saline water extracted through local wells is used for dust suppression, thus reducing the need for freshwater. Furthermore, some of the wastewater is treated and reused, thus further reducing water demand. Freshwater demand is met from the Erongo Desalination Plant that also supplies neighboring communities. Since the lifetime of the plant (30 years) is longer than the expected lifetime of the mine (12 years), already when the plant was planned it was expected that it would be taken over by NamWater at the closure of the mine.

The UN evaluated in 2011 that Namibia has improved its water access network significantly since independence in 1990. Furthermore, in rural areas access is sometimes limited by the long distance between residences and water points. As a result, many Namibians prefer the traditional wells over the available water points far away.

=== Water supply and water use in Windhoek ===
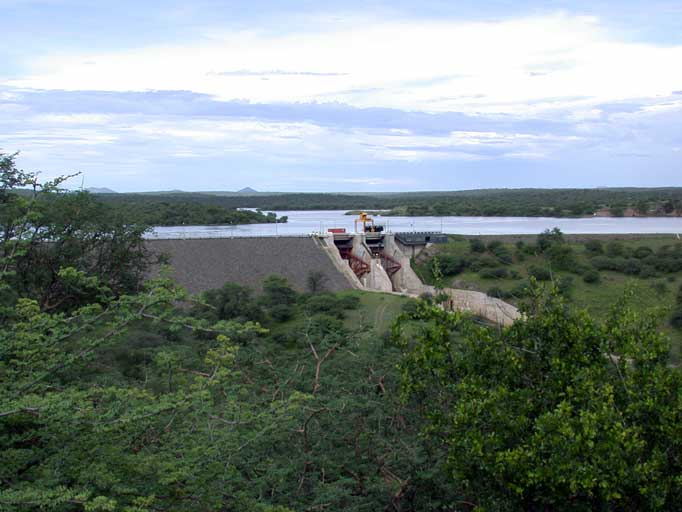
The von Bach Dam supplies Windhoek and other localities in Central Namibia with drinking water.

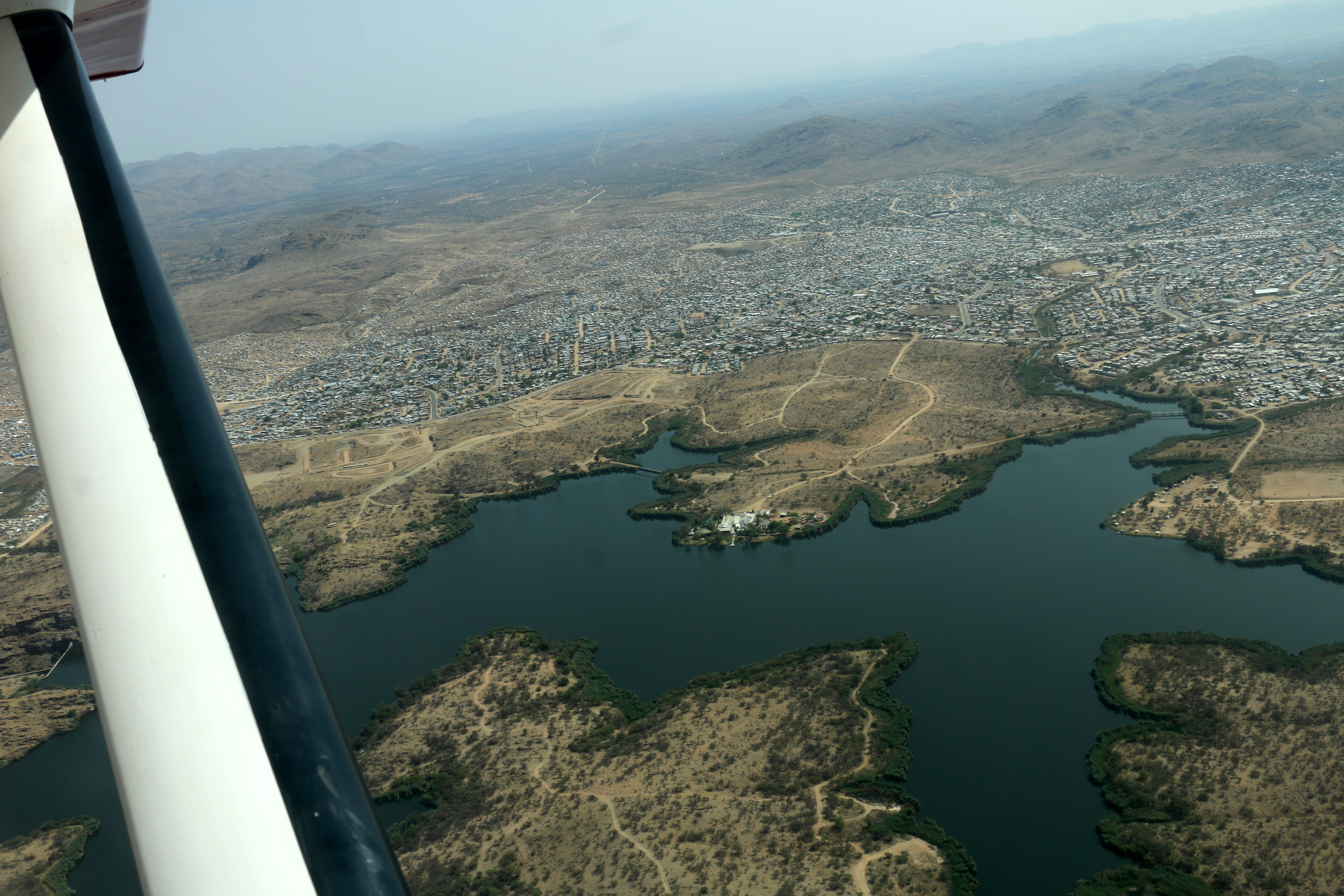
Goreangab Dam aerial view

Windhoek is provided with water from three different sources. As of 2006 17 Mio m^{³} of the water demand was covered by dams around Windhoek, such as the Von Bach Dam, 5.4 Mio m^{³} from the Goreangab Reclamation Plant and only between 1 and 2 Mio m^{³} still come from boreholes. The city estimates per capita water consumption at 200-liter per capita per day including industries, businesses and tourism, which is slightly higher than in Europe. An analysis of residential water consumption alone estimated it at 163-liter per capita per day in 2010, with significant differences between neighborhoods. For example, it was 306-liter in high-income neighborhoods in the South-East, while it was only 27 liters in informal settlements in the North. During the severe drought of 2015/16, water users in central Namibia were required to cut usage by up to 30 percent. In April 2016, the city of Windhoek launched a Zero Tolerance to Water Wastage policy, under which it would disconnect or fine on anyone using potable supply to water gardens or wash cars. The Swakoppoort Dam, Von Bach Dam and Omatako Dam, which supply the region, were only filled at 11 percent of their capacity. In May 2016, the Coca-Cola Namibia Bottling Company stopped production due to the severe water shortages.

== Responsibility for water supply and sanitation ==
The Ministry of Agriculture, Water and Forestry is in charge of water resources management, drinking water supply and sanitation in Namibia. Within the Ministry the Department for Water Resources Management and the Department for Rural Water and Sanitation Coordination are in charge of water supply and sanitation. NamWater is a state-owned bulk water supplier that operates dams, pipelines and water treatment plants throughout the country. Created in 1997, it provides and sells water to mines, as well as to municipalities which in turn distribute and sell the water to households, businesses and offices in their respective service areas. In rural areas, the Directorate of Rural Water Supply of the Ministry of Agriculture, Water and Forestry is in charge of water supply and sanitation.

== Infrastructure ==
NamWater operates 16 dams, 14 water transmission lines (called "water supply networks") and 16 water treatment plants. The transmission lines are as follows:

Name	Purpose	Length in km	Capacity m^{3}/h	Commissioning
Berg Aukas-Grootfontein scheme	Transfer of ground water from the Berg Aukas Mine in the Grootfontein District to the Eastern National Water Carrier to be supplied to the Central Areas of Namibia during periods of water shortage.	18	720	1998
Dreigratsdrift-Skorpion Mine scheme	Supply of potable water to the Skorpion mine and Rosh Pinah town.	42	870	2002
Koichab Pan-Lüderitz scheme	Potable water supply from Koichab Aquifer to Lüderitz	120	200	2002
Naute-Keetmanshoop scheme	Potable water supply to Keetmanshoop in Southern Namibia and irrigation water to Naute irrigation scheme down stream of Naute Dam	44	400	1972
Omatako-Von Bach scheme	Transfer of raw water from the Omatako to Von Bach Dam.	94	720	1984
Swakopmund-Langer Heinrich scheme	Potable water supply to Langer Heinrich Mine, a uranium mine.	82	205	2006
Swakoppoort-Von Bach scheme	Transfer of raw water from Swakoppoort Dam to Von Bach Dam to supply the Windhoek area, with reverse gravity flow option from Von Bach Dam to Swakoppoort Dam.	54	1450	1979/2004
Calueque–Oshakati canal	Transfer of raw water from the Cunene River at Ruacana on the Angolan border through Ogongo to Oshakati purification plant for potable, live stock and irrigation demand. The pipeline had been damaged in 1988 during the Angolan-South African war.	150	n.a.	1997 (Ogongo-Oshakati Canal)
Grootfontein-Omatako canal	A major now unused component of the never completed Eastern National Water Carrier.	300	7,200	1987
Kuiseb-Mile7 Scheme	Potable water supply to Walvis Bay	30	800	n.a.
Omafo-Eenhana scheme	Transfer of potable from Omafo to Eenhana.	48	20	1995
Omdel-Swakopmund scheme	Potable water supply to Henties Bay, Swakopmund, Arandis and the uranium mines Rössing mine and Langer Heinrich Mine.	115	685	1975
Swakopmund-Rössing scheme	Potable water supply to Arandis & Rössing uranium mines	55	1,100	1976
Von Bach-Windhoek scheme	Transfer of potable water from the Von Bach Purification Plant to Windhoek	62	2,740	1971/1981

== History ==
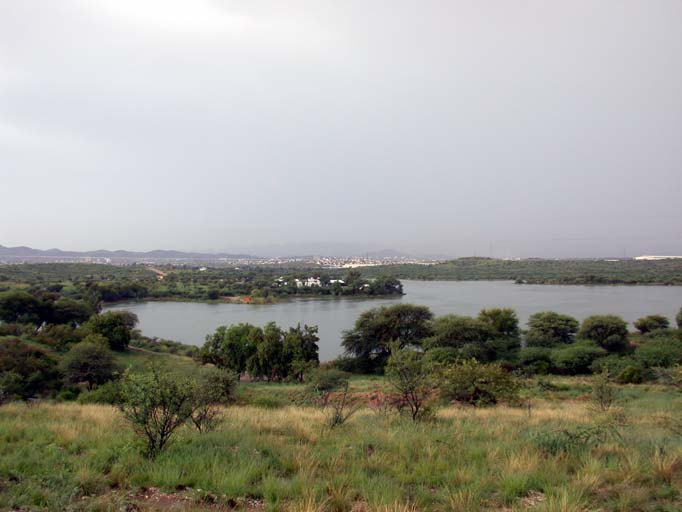
The Goreangab reservoir in Windhoek, looking downstream away from the city.

In Windhoek, groundwater was almost the only source of water for until 1958 when a small surface reservoir, the Goreangab Dam, was built downstream from Windhoek. A conventional water treatment plant was also constructed to treat the surface water from this reservoir. In 1960 the Gammams Wastewater Treatment Plant was commissioned near Goreangab Dam, discharging treated wastewater downstream of the reservoir. Subsequently, industrial and domestic effluents at the wastewater treatment plant were separated. The plant treating the domestic wastewater was upgraded so that its effluent could be further treated in the existing water treatment plant.

The water treatment plant was also upgraded, so that it could further treat the treated wastewater in one train, alongside the existing train for the raw water from Goreangab Dam. Thus, the Goreangab Reclamation Plant was born in 1968. Its output was blended with water from the city's well field and was delivered as drinking water to the city's residents. When the city grew further, the municipality started to receive water from the Von Bach Dam 70 km (43 mi) north of Windhoek commissioned in 1970. The 1974 Water Master Plan envisaged The Eastern National Water Carrier to supply water to Namibia's central area from the Okavango River, some 750 km (470 mi) kilometers to the north on the Angolan border. Construction of the carrier began in the late 1970s in several phases from South to North, first connecting the von Bach Dam to the newly built Omatako Dam further north over a distance of 94 km (58 mi), and then connecting the Omatako Dam to Grootfontein over a distance of another 300 km (190 mi). However, the next and last phase of the scheme connecting Grootfontein to the Okavango River near Rundu was never built. The Omatako Dam, completed in 1981, now only receives flood water and is empty most of the time.

In the 1990s, the city introduced progressive water pricing and educational programs that reduced consumption substantially. The daily per capita residential consumption decreased from 201 liters in 1990/91 to 117 liters in 1996/97, partly due to the introduction of a very high drought tariff. When the normal water tariff was put in place again in 1997/98, the consumption increased to 130 liters/person/day. Total per capita consumption including commerce and industry shows a reduction from 322 liters/capita/day in 1990/91 to 201 liters/capita/day in 1997/98. According to a study by the International Union for Conservation of Nature (IUCN), water consumption was lowered in all sectors, which is a major achievement because the reduction in water consumption in public buildings is not easily achieved. In schools, government buildings and municipal gardens, army bases and prisons the water consumption was lowered by as much as 50%. These savings postponed new supply infrastructure by about 10 years. But despite all these savings more water was needed. Thus the plant's capacity was almost tripled in 2002, allowing it to provide more than a third of the city's water demand and to relieve overused groundwater resources.

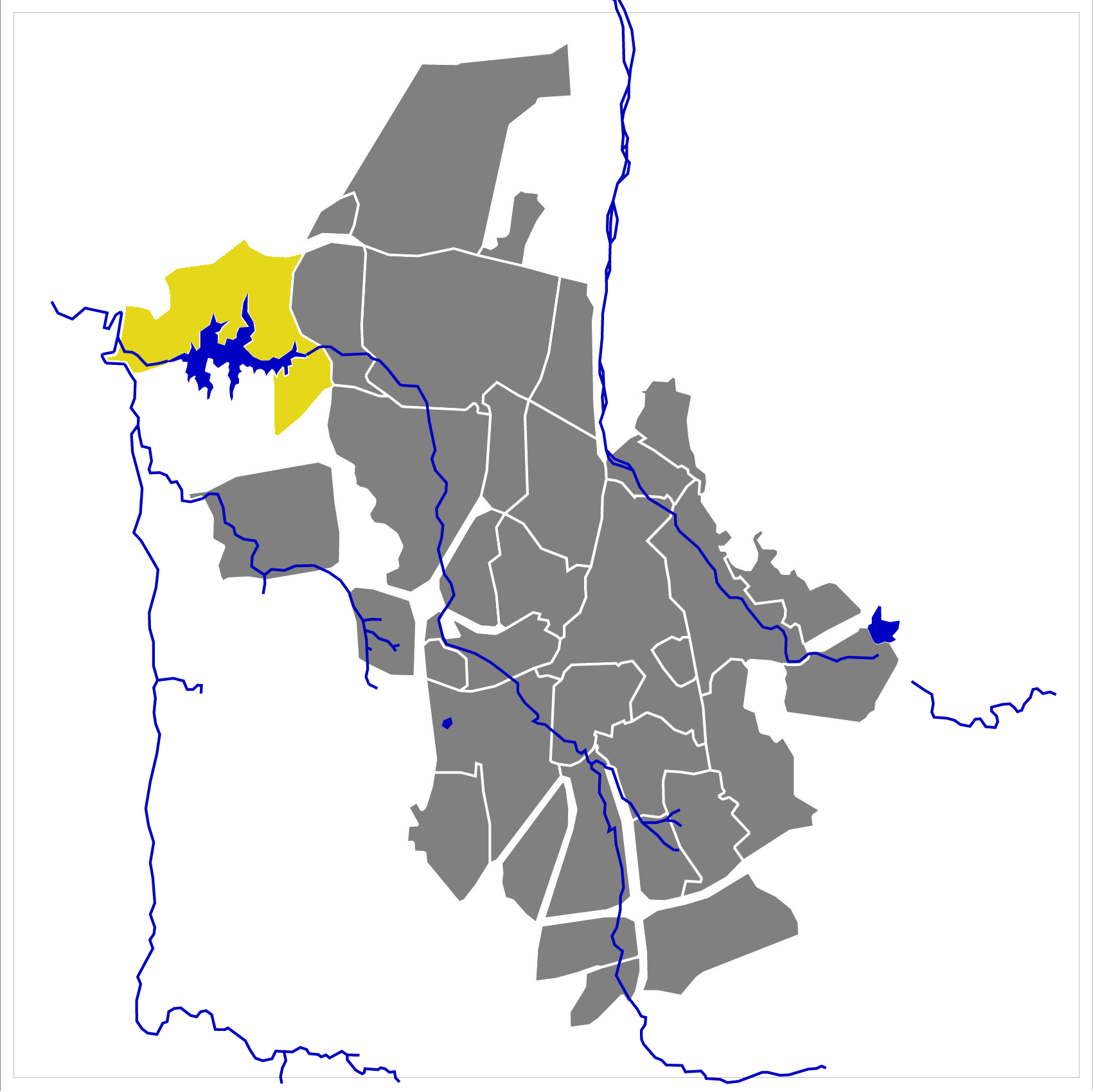
The watershed of the Goreangab reservoir is heavily urbanized, as shown on this map.

To retain public confidence, water quality at the Goreangab Treatment Plant is monitored on an ongoing basis after every process step. In the event of any quality problems, the plant goes into recycle mode and water is not delivered. According to Pisani "The citizens of Windhoek have over time become used to the idea that potable reuse is included in their water provision process. In fact, they have grown to harbor a fair amount of pride in the fact that their city in many respects leads the world in direct reclamation." The upgrading of the plant was partly funded by the European Investment Bank (EIB) and Germany through KfW development bank. In its ex-post evaluation of the project, KfW noted that the plant faced considerable technical difficulties and temporary shutdowns over a period of seven years until it started to work properly. KfW noted that in the spirit of integrated water resources management more should have been done to reduce the per capita water consumption in Windhoek and to protect the Goreangab Dam from pollution, for example by establishing a protection zone with restricted activities around the reservoir. It also noted that the plant did achieve its objective to relieve pressure on overexploited groundwater resources.

== Financial aspects ==
Namibia spends about 3% of its Gross Domestic Product on the operation expenditures of it water utilities. This is by far the highest percentage of all Sub-Saharan countries. Per capita, Namibia spends about 80US$ annually on water supply and sanitation, other countries in the region spend between 1 and 10 US$. Providing access to utility water in Namibia costs 4,000 US$ per capita on average.

=== Financing ===
A large share of these expenses is borne by NamWater. NamWater passes its costs fully on to its customers. Since its inception some customers failed to pay their water bills, resulting in poor financial performance. However, beginning in 2003 the company was turned around financially, including also by cutting costs. Today NamWater refinances itself to a large extent through notes issues in the Namibian stock market. As of 2015, interest paid on five-year notes issued in the same year was 9.05 percent and the company had a BBB rating from the rating agency Fitch.

=== Tariffs ===
Water tariffs in Namibia are among the highest in Africa. The first block of the residential water tariff in Windhoek costs N$13.86 (USD 0.92) per cubic metre in 2016. The water tariff includes a fixed monthly charge of N$74.43 (5 USD) which is independent of consumption. The first consumption block includes a basic consumption of 200-liter per household and day, an amount that is high for small households but can be low for large households. Higher consumption is charged at a higher tariff that was N$20.93 per cubic metre (USD 1.40) in 2015. The municipality bills water together with electricity, solid waste collection and the property tax. Residents of informal settlements receive water through public standpipes equipped with prepaid water meters. Prepaid customers pay about USD 1.9 per kiloliter (cubic metre), or about USD 0.038 per 20‐liter container.

Water tariffs in other municipalities vary. Those municipalities that receive bulk water from NamWater, which includes all large municipalities, have to recover the costs of bulk water supply plus the cost of water distribution to the customers through their own networks. A few smaller municipalities that have their own water sources are not subject to this constraint. For example, the municipality of Oranjemund provides water for free and thus has by far the highest water use in the country with an astonishing 2,667 liters/capita/day. Bulk water tariff charged by NamWater vary slightly across the country depending on the cost of supplying a specific location, but these differences are not fully passed on to municipalities. Thus NamWater effectively cross-subsidizes localities with high supply costs with surpluses from localities with lower supply costs.

== Sanitation ==
Compared to the efforts made to improve access to safe water, Namibia is lagging behind in the provision of adequate sanitation. This includes 298 schools that have no toilet facilities. Over 50% of child deaths are related to lack of water, sanitation, or hygiene; 23% are due to diarrhea alone. The UN has identified a "sanitation crisis" in the country.

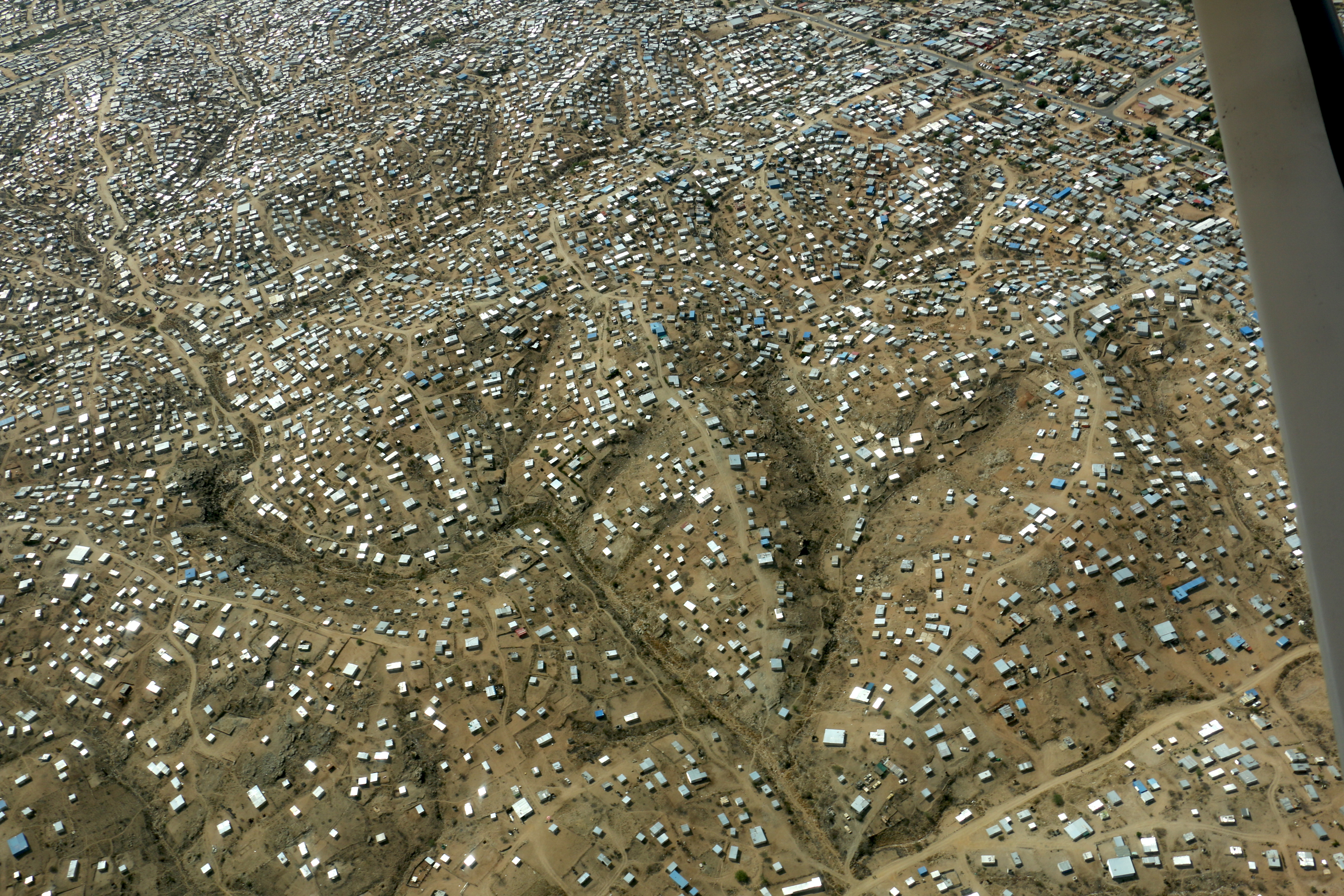
Township near Goreangab Dam

Apart from residences for upper and middle class households, sanitation is insufficient in most residential areas. Private flush toilets are too expensive for virtually all residents in townships due to their water consumption and installation cost. As a result, access to improved sanitation has not increased much since independence: In Namibia's rural areas as of 2008 13% of the population had more than basic sanitation, up from 8% in 1990. Many of Namibia's inhabitants have to resort to "flying toilets", plastic bags to defecate which after use are flung into the bush. The use of open areas close to residential land to urinate and defecate is very common and has been identified as a major health hazard.

A National Sanitation Strategy 2010-15 estimated that it would cost N$1.64 billion over five years to reach the strategy's goal through 186 individual initiatives. The strategy also noted that it was unlikely that the government would be able to afford these costs.

== See also ==
- Water supply and sanitation in Sub-Saharan Africa
- Economy of Namibia
- Health in Namibia
