= Omaruru Reformed Church =

The Omaruru Reformed Church is a congregation of the Dutch Reformed Church in South Africa (NGK) in the town of Omaruru, Namibia. It is the oldest daughter church of the Otjiwarongo Reformed Church (NGK) (earlier known as Moria), from whence all the NGK congregations north and west of Windhoek, capital of Namibia, directly or indirectly descend. Omaruru separated from Otjiwarongo on March 1, 1941, and services were held in Omaruru, Karibib, Usakos, Swakopmund, Walvis Bay, and Kalkfeld. Still large and difficult to serve, the Omaruru congregation let the Usakos Reformed Church (NGK) (Walvis Bay-Swakopmund) go in 1946.

Omaruru is located on the leafy, lush banks of the Omaruru River and is located near the spectacular Omaruru hill. After a long period when the Rev. Ignatius C. Schutte of Otjiwarongo had held services there as a custodian, the Rev. L.W. Lehmkuhl became the first pastor of Omaruru. After a fruitful three-year tenure, he was given leave on June 24, 1944, and replaced by the Rev. G.P. du Toit, ordained on February 10, 1945 and serving until March 19, 1949.

After a vacancy of around six months, the next pastor, the Rev. A.J. Stals (previously the first pastor of the Warmbad Reformed Church in southern Namibia, was appointed to Omaruru on September 10, 1949. The first parsonage was built in August 1950. Church halls were built in Omaruru and Kalkfeld, and later also in Karibib, which remained a part of the congregation despite lying 65 km from Omaruru, twice as far as Usakos.

Although it covered a large area, the Omaruru congregation's membership was never that large since it covered an area with predominantly German settlers, even before the depopulation of the countryside. In 1985, the congregation had only 318 confirmed members, down to 158 in 2012. The Usakos congregation, which eventually spun off its own daughter churches in Walvis Bay and Swakopmund, went from 231 to 97 confirmed members in the same period.

== Select pastors ==
- Louis Wessels Lemkuhl, 1941–1944
- George Philip du Toit, February 10, 1945 – 1949
- Albert Jacobus Stals, 1949–1953
- Pieter de Vos Grobbelaar, 1954–1956
- Wynand Arnoldus Pretorius, January 26, 1957 – ?
- Bennie Meyer, August 19, 1967–1972

== Sources ==
- Olivier, ds. P.L. (compiler). 1952. Ons gemeentelike feesalbum. Cape Town/Pretoria: N.G. Kerk-Uitgewers.
