= Swakop River =

River in Namibia

Swakop
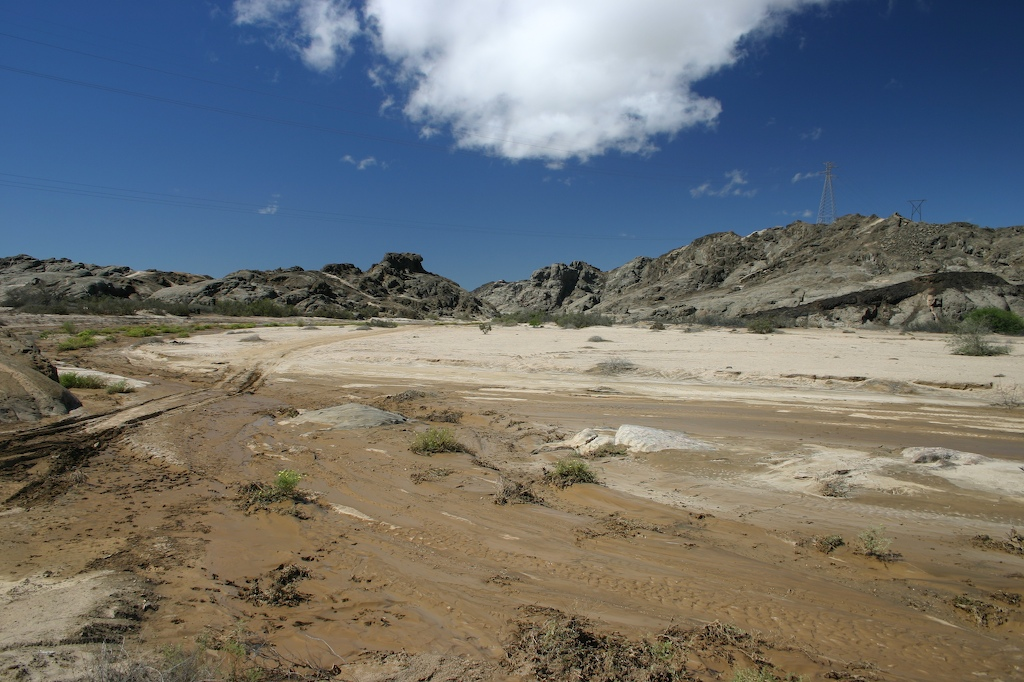
- The landscape of the Swakop River Valley near Richthofen
- Native name: Tsoaxaub (Khoekhoe)

Location
- Country: Namibia
- Regions: Khomas, Otjozondjupa, Erongo

Physical characteristics
- Source: Eros Mountains near Otjozondjati
  - elevation: 1,560 m (5,120 ft)
- Mouth
  - location: Atlantic Ocean
  - coordinates: 22°40′S 14°32′E
  - elevation: 0 m (0 ft)
- Length: 460 km (290 mi)
- Basin size: 30,100 km^{2} (11,600 sq mi)

Basin features
- Tributaries
  - left: Otjiseva River, Kaan River, Tsaobis River
  - right: Sney River, Omusema River, Gami Kaub River, Khan River
- Waterbodies: Von Bach Dam, Swakoppoort Dam

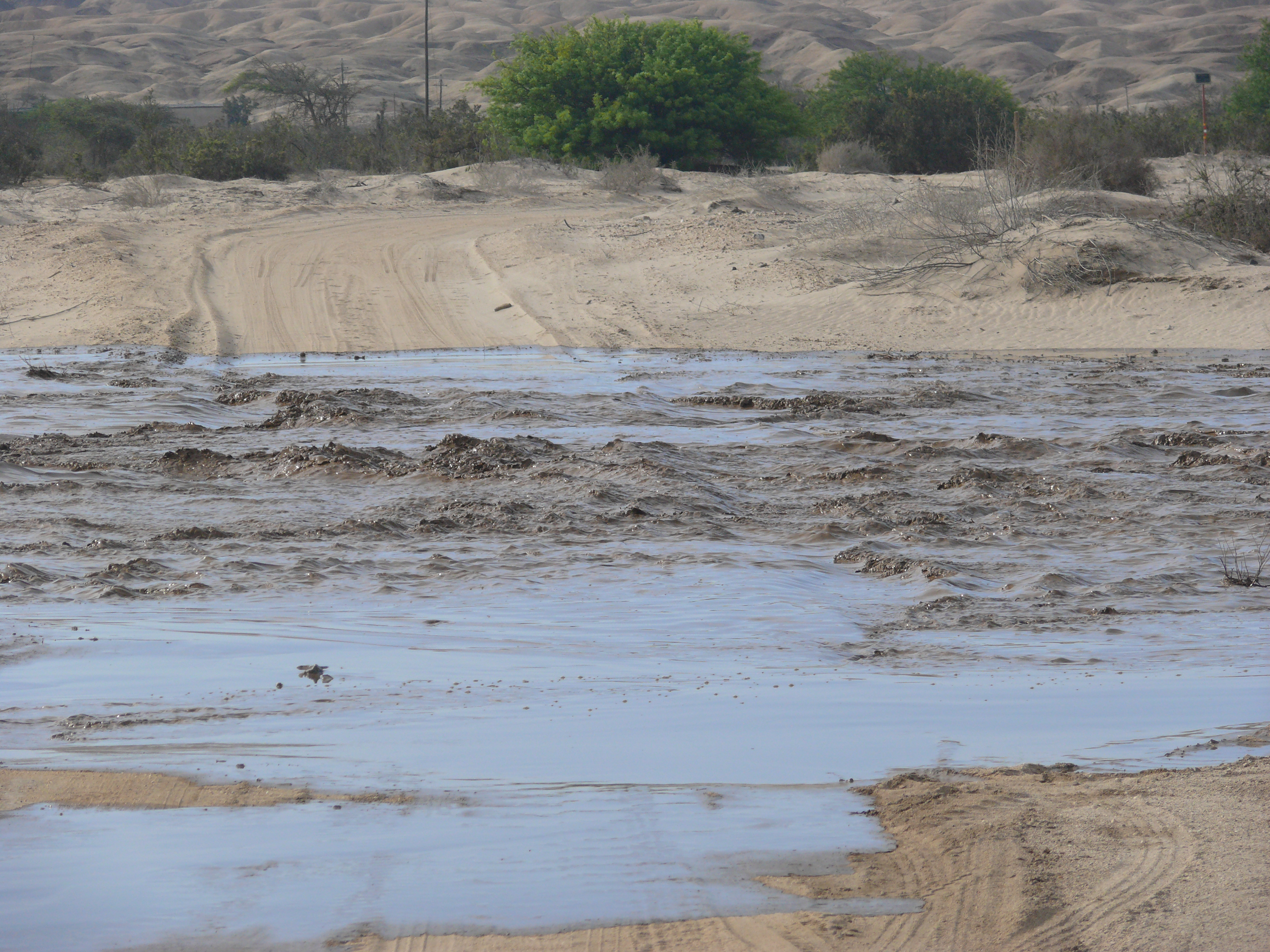
The Swakop River flooding 20 km outside Swakopmund on 15 February 2008.

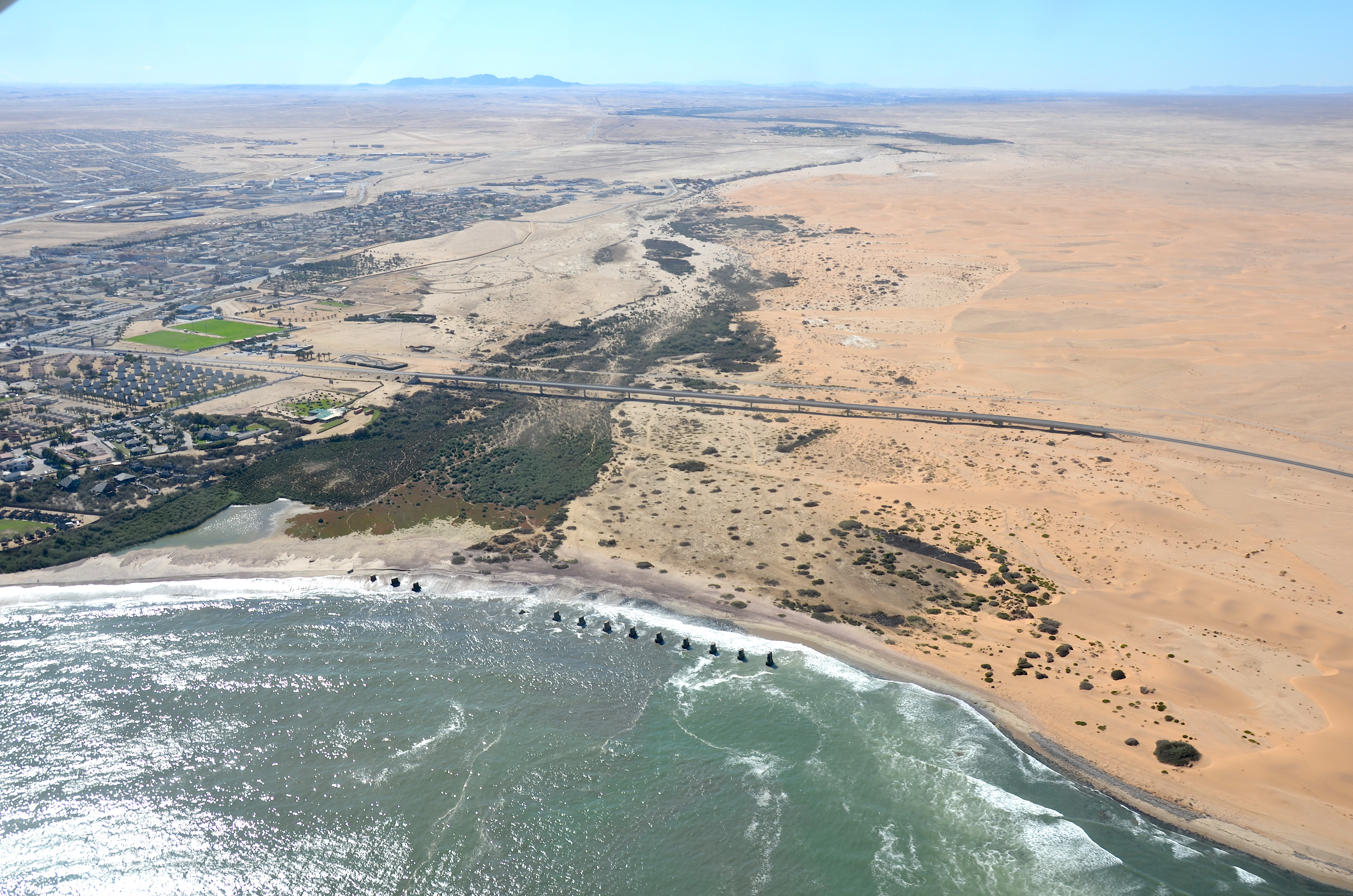
Where the Swakop meets the Atlantic Ocean (2017). Poles of the old railway bridge seen in the foreground.

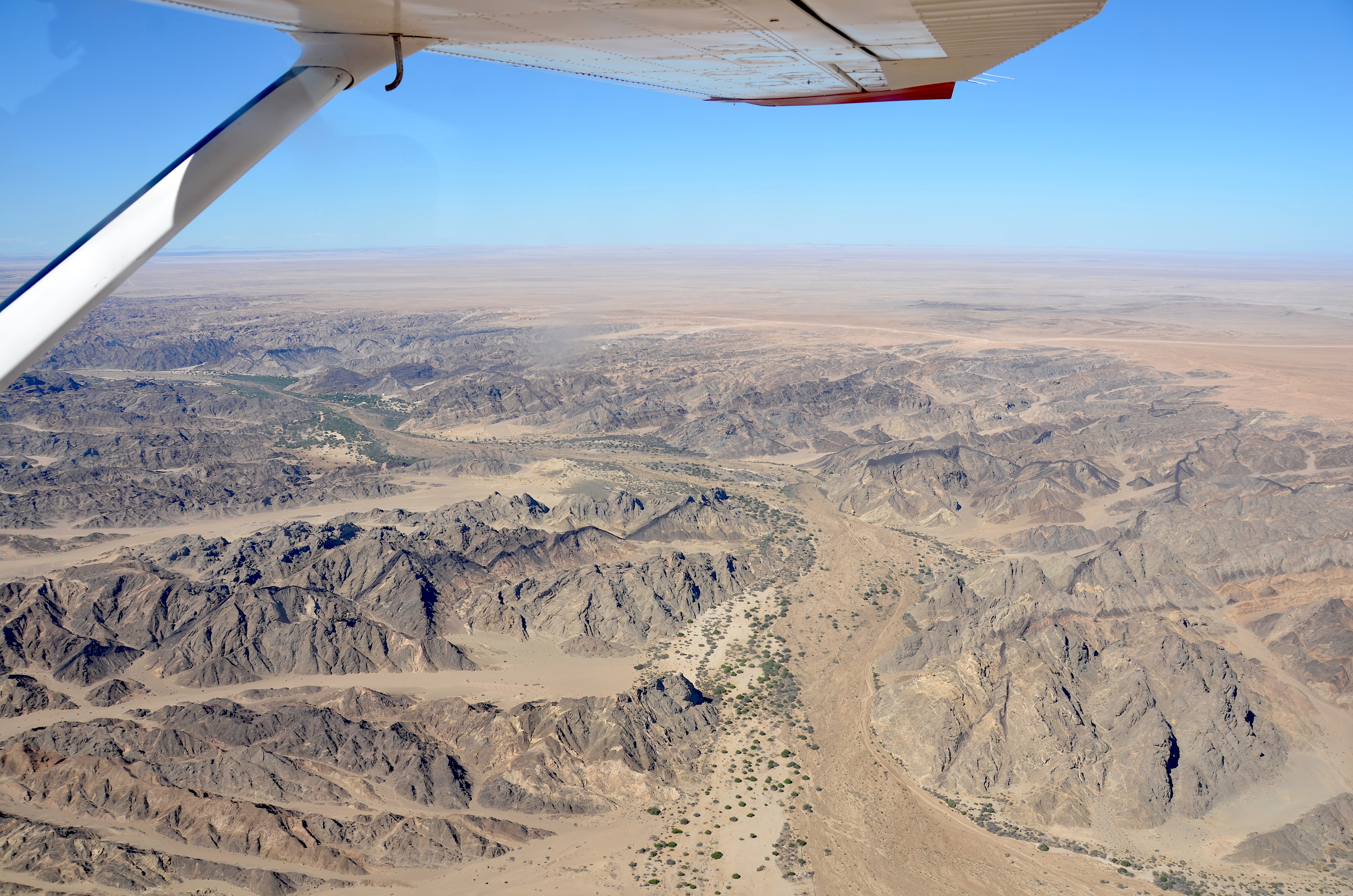
Aerial view of Swakop River (2017).

The Swakop River (Khoekhoe: Tsoaxaub) is a major river in western central Namibia. Its source is in the Khomas Highland. From there it flows westwards through the town of Okahandja, the historic mission station at Gross Barmen, and the settlement of Otjimbingwe. It then crosses the Namib desert and reaches the Atlantic Ocean at Swakopmund ('Mouth of the Swakop'). The Swakop is an ephemeral river; its run-off is roughly 40 million cubic metres per annum. It has reached the Atlantic Ocean most recently in 2011, 2022, and 2025.

The Swakop River, along with its main tributary Khan, is one of the largest temporary water-bearing rivers in the dry western part of Namibia. It is 460 km (290 mi) long and has a 30,100 km^{2} (11,600 sq mi) large catchment area (including its tributaries).

The area around the river mouth and the surrounding dunes are also known for rich bird life and some unusual plant species (like the Welwitschia) that use the regular fog drifting in from the sea to sustain themselves in the absence of other moisture.

Groundwater levels in the area have dropped about 0.3 m further due to the presence of two big dams built on the Swakop River.

Notwithstanding the river’s irregular flow, some agriculture is undertaken in the Swakop River valley. Thus, the region is well known for its fresh produce, especially tomatoes, asparagus and olives. There are some fears of salt and uranium (possibly natural, possibly from the Rössing uranium mine) endangering this farming industry.

== Etymology ==
The name comes from the Khoekhoe phrase Tsoa-xaub, from tsoa ("anus") and xaub ("excrement"). The name derives from the observation of the flow of large amounts of brownish sludge that discharge into the Atlantic Ocean with the rains.

== Hydrology ==
The Swakop drains a catchment area of 30,100 km^{2} extending from the mouth into the Atlantic Ocean at Swakopmund over Otjimbingwe and in the east to about 50 km from Okahandja, and in the south to Khomas Highlands outside Windhoek. The highest point of the watershed is located at 2,480 m. Annual rainfall varies from 0 mm in the lower reaches up to 475 mm in the eastern Khomas Highlands. Rainfall exceeds 300 mm per year in 39% of the catchment area, and up to 80% of the catchment experiences annual rainfall above 100 mm.

The Von Bach Dam near Okahandja and Swakoppoort Dam west of Gross Barmen in the upper reaches of the Swakop are of great importance for the water supply of Central Namibia. Like all rivers, the Swakop also has a number of major sources and major wetlands in the lower reaches. Existing groundwater, however, is often salty due to soil salinity.

On the lower reaches of the river, flooding has become ever more increasing, due to increased land use of the Swakop gallery forests. This contributes to a stronger and more rapid runoff and increased erosion of the Swakop Marshlands.

== Vegetation and fauna ==
Because of its size and scope, the Swakop has a very diverse catchment area. 29% of the area is in highveld savanna, 28% in thornveld savanna, 34% in semidesert and savanna transition zone, and 9% in the central Namib Desert. In the Highlands a more or less dense bush vegetation prevails. In the arid lower reaches there is a more limited flora in the Swakop River valley itself, with the typical gallery vegetation from ana trees (Faidherbia albida), tamarisk (Tamarix), camel thorn (Acacia erioloba), Salvadora, various fig species, Euclea and also tobacco (Nicotiana spp.), Jimsonweed (Datura) and mesquite (Prosopis spp.) as invasive species.

Wildlife in the Swakop River valley is found practically only in the sparsely populated lower reaches and is limited to antelope, smaller predators and birds. Animals such as elephants, rhinos, lions and other big cats are no longer to be found.

== Usage and colonisation ==
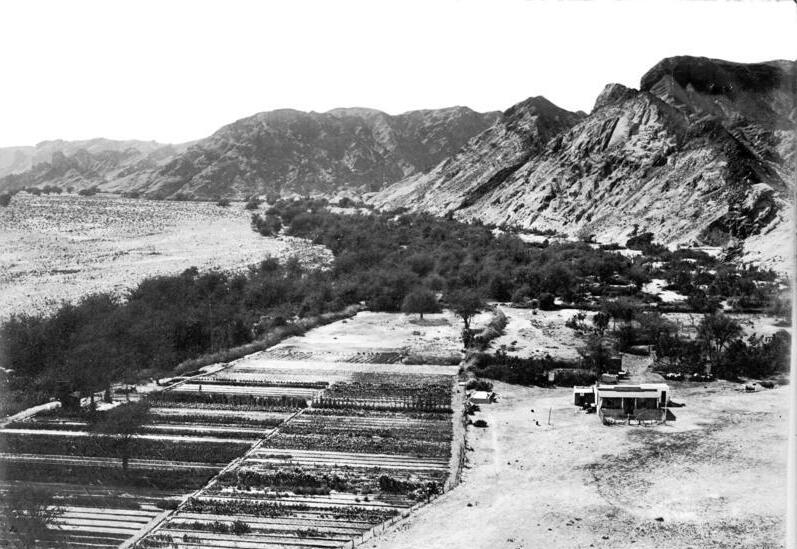
The farm of Goanikontes in Swakop River, circa 1906.

Unlike the rest of the dry rivers in western Namibia, there are large human settlements in the basin of the Swakop River, such as the towns of Usakos, Karibib, Otjimbingwe, Okahandja and Namibia's capital, Windhoek, so that the population in the catchment area is more than 200,000 persons.

While in the upper reaches of the river the farms are often far from the river and extensive grazing is operated, the dams and the high groundwater level along the entire Swakop River valley make intensive farming and even gardening, such as the cultivation of asparagus in Swakopmund Goanikontes, possible.

The extensive use of the groundwater in agriculture and the high water consumption in cities result in the lowering of the water table. This leads, particularly in the lower reaches, to the drying up of many springs as well as to the death of the gallery vegetation. Due to agricultural practices, erosion has greatly increased, so that more and more valuable soil is lost and the intensity of the Swakop floods increases.

Uranium mines such as the Langer Heinrich mine, in the lower reaches of the Swakop, and the Rössing Mine at Khan use enormous quantities of water that further lower the water table. In addition, it is also often claimed that radioactive dust across the Khan gets into the Swakop, and therefore the vegetables cultivated there are contaminated by radioactive materials.

The Swakop Bridge in Swakopmund is a notable man-made sight near the place where the river empties into the ocean.
