= Usakos railway station =

Railway station in Namibia

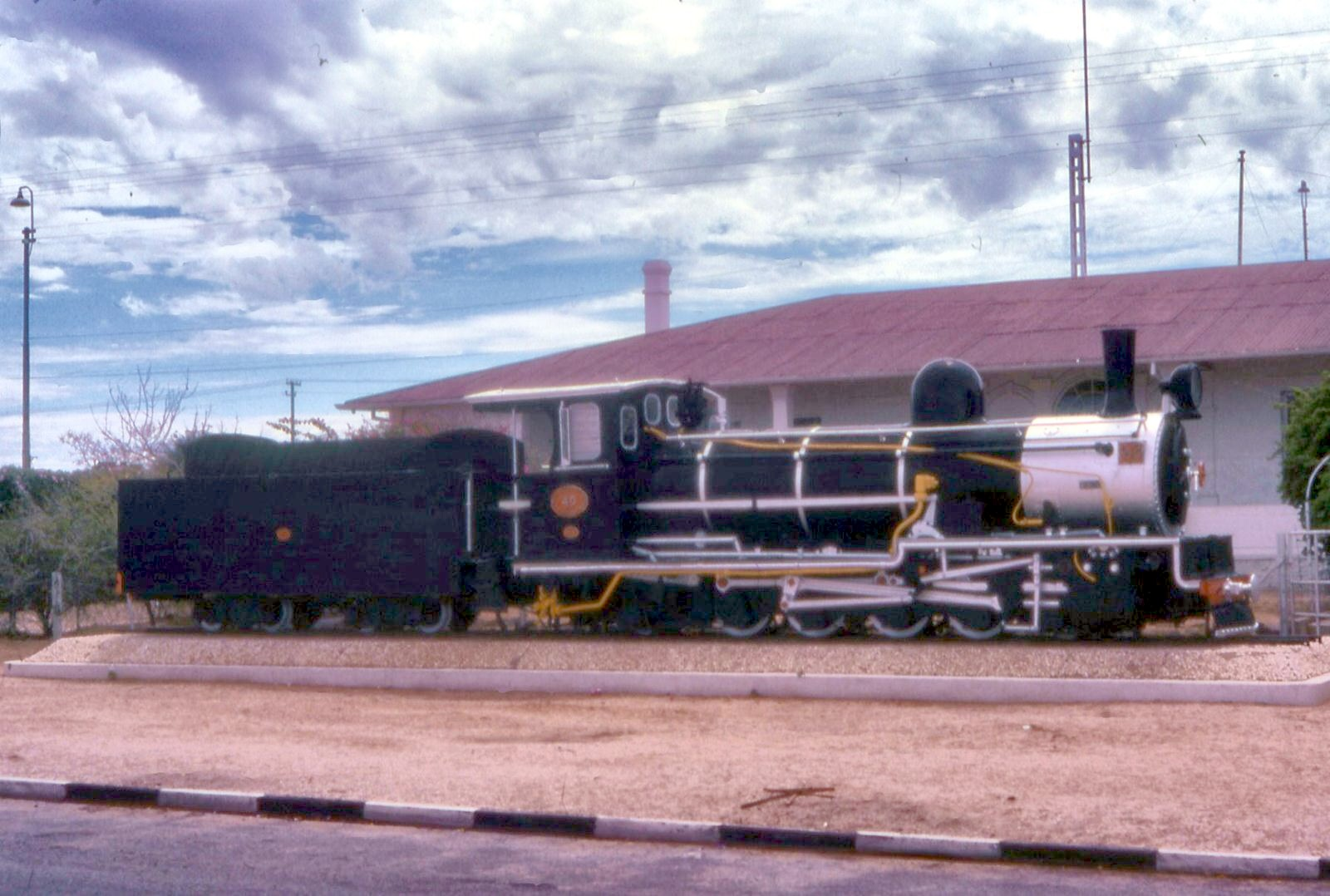
- Locomotive no. 40 plinthed at Usakos railway station

General information
- Coordinates: 22°00′01″S 15°35′17″E
- System: Railway station
- Owner: TransNamib

History
- Opened: early 1900s
Location

Usakos railway station is a railway station in Namibia serving the town of Usakos. It is part of the TransNamib railway network. The station building is dilapidated but passenger trains still stop at Usakos.

The station was established in the early 1900s as a watering point, stopover, and workshop for the line from Swakopmund to Tsumeb, an industrial narrow-gauge line operated by the Otavi Minen- und Eisenbahngesellschaft (Otavi Mining and Railway Company, OMEG), with a length of 567 kilometres (352 mi).

When the Windhoek—Swakopmund line was built in 1902 during Imperial Germany's colonial rule of German South West Africa, it also connected Usakos. In 1914 this line was extended to Walvis Bay.

Usakos is connected to a number of towns in the north of Namibia via the railway junction in nearby Kranzberg, and to the south and east of Namibia via Windhoek.

== See also ==
- Rail transport in Namibia
