= Usakos Reformed Church (NGK) =

Namibian congregation of the NGK

The Usakos Reformed Church is a congregation of the Dutch Reformed Church in South Africa (NGK) in Namibia, established in 1946 and serving as the mother church to all five congregations of the Namibian coast, except for the Lüderitz Reformed Church (NGK).

== Foundation ==
At its founding, the Usakos congregation included the city of Usakos as well as Swakopmund and Walvis Bay. It covered an extensive territory and took its name from what was then the major population center, though the coastal cities later surpassed Usakos's growth. The parsonage was in Usakos and a single pastor served the entire congregation from there. In 1952, six years after its foundation, the congregation had 900 confirmed members out of 1,400 souls, of whom more than two-thirds lived in Usakos proper. In 2010, the membership had more than trebled to 2,774, but by then less than 4% (96 members) lived in Usakos, but 36% were in Swakopmund, 43% in Walvis Bay, and 17% in Henties Bay.

The congregation stretched from the Namib Desert through growing levels of vegetation to the verdant hills east of Usakos.

The congregation seceded from the Omaruru Reformed Church on November 16, 1946, only five years after the latter had separated from the Otjiwarongo Reformed Church (NGK), founded in 1902 as the Moria congregation. The capstone for the Usakos church was laid on April 10, 1936, by the Rev. F.J.W. Koch, pastor of Moria, and it opened the same year. In Walvis Bay, the ribbon on the NGK church was cut by the Rev. B.J. Pienaar, the railway pastor. The first pastor of Usakos, the Rev. P. Visser, who would several years later leave for Vanrhynsdorp, laid the keystone in Walvis Bay. In Swakopmund, a church was also built early on, its keystone laid by Mrs. A.F.W. Tydeman, one of the oldest members of the congregation who had campaigned for years to build a church in South West Africa's premier beach resort. Earlier, services had been held there once a month in the German church.

Before the foundation, the pastors of predecessor churches included the Rev. F.J.W. Koch in Moria, the Rev. I.C. Schutte in Otjiwarongo, and the Revs. L.W. Lemkuhl and G.P. du Toit of Omaruru. The Rev. P. Visser served Usakos from 1947 to 1949, and was succeeded by the Rev. B.R. Buys, who in 1950 became pastor of what was at first called the Usakos (Walvis Bay-Swakopmund) congregation.

Walvis Bay seceded from Usakos in 1952, and Swakopmund seceded in turn from Walvis Bay in 1957.

== Select pastors ==
- Barend Rudolph Buys, 1950–1952
- Nicolaas Johannes Mostert, 1958–1960
- Christiaan Hendrik Pauley Malan, 1960–1963
- Willem Victor Reynierse, 1966–1971
- Adriaan Jacobus Bezuidenhout, February 5, 1972 – 1977

== Sources ==
- Phil Olivier (compiler). 1952. Ons gemeentelike feesalbum. Cape Town/Pretoria: N.G. Kerk-Uitgewers.
