= Swakoppoort Dam =

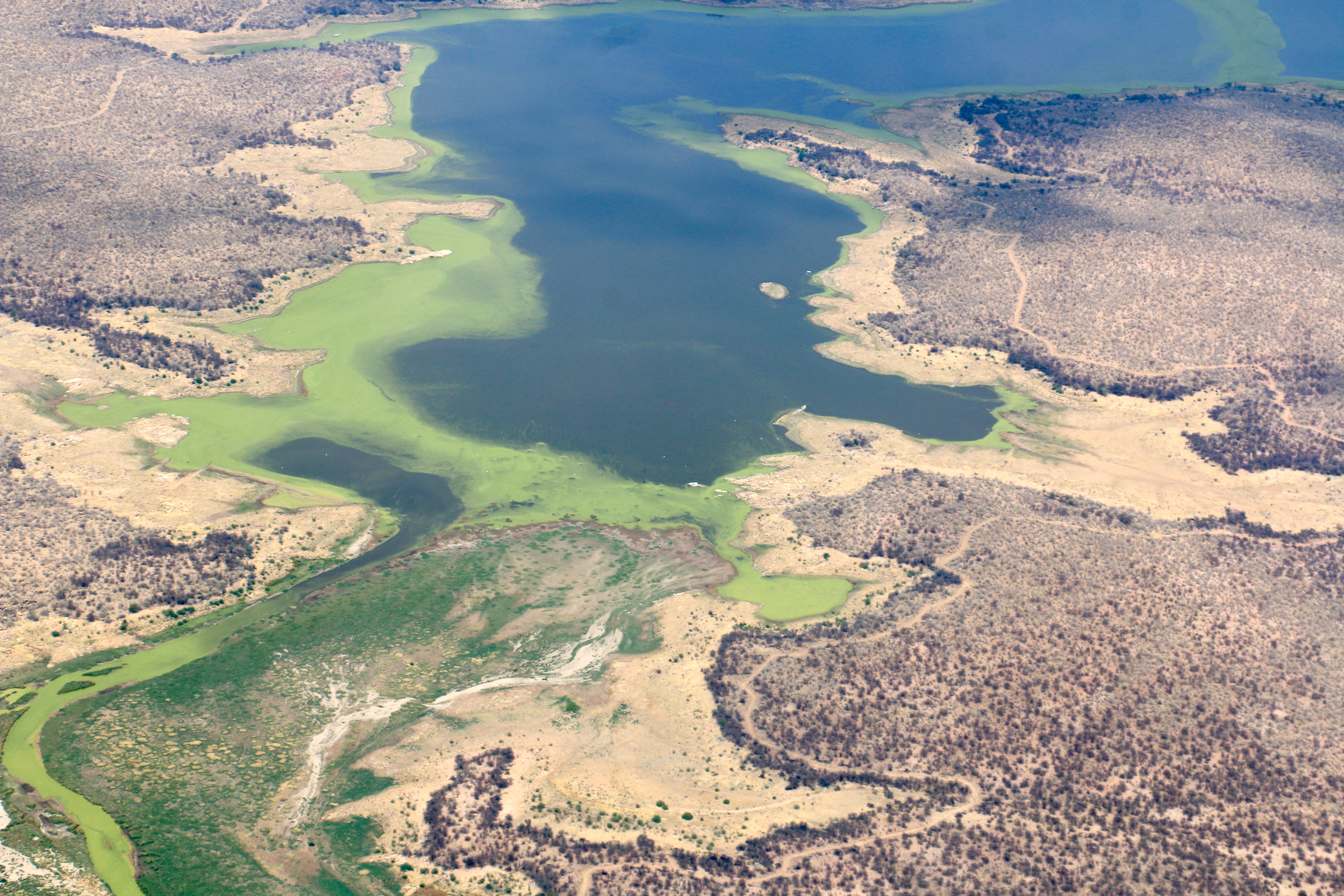
- Aerial view of Swakoppoort Dam
- Official name: Swakoppoort Dam
- Location: Okahandja, Otjozondjupa Region, Namibia
- Coordinates: 22.212°S 16.527°E
- Opening date: 1978

Dam and spillways
- Type of dam: Surface reservoir
- Impounds: Swakop River

Reservoir
- Total capacity: 63.489×10^{6} m^{3} (83,040,000 cu yd)
- Surface area: 7,808 m^{2} (0.7808 ha)

Swakoppoort Dam is a dam 50 kilometres (31 mi) outside of Okahandja, Otjozondjupa Region, Namibia. It dams the Swakop River and occasionally receives inflow from the Omatako Dam on Swakop's tributary Omatako. Its capacity is 63.489 million cubic metres (83,040,000 cu yd). Completed in 1978, it is one of three dams to supply water to the capital Windhoek. It also supplies the Navachab mine and the town of Karibib.
