= Khan River =

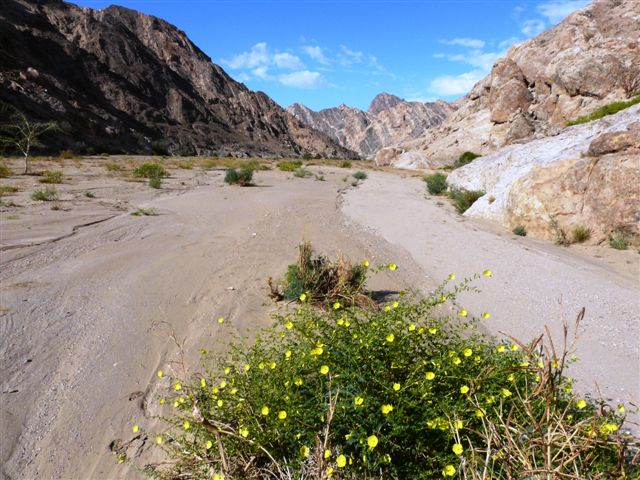

Physical characteristics
- Source: Otjisemba, northwest of Okahandja
  - location: Otjozondjupa Region
  - coordinates: 22°42′S 14°54′E
- Mouth: Swakop River
  - location: c.40 kilometres (25 mi) east of Swakopmund
- Basin size: 8,400 km^{2} (3,200 sq mi)

Basin features
- Tributaries
  - right: Slang River, Etiro River

The river Khan is an ephemeral river crossing the Erongo region of central Namibia. It is the main tributary of the Swakop River and only occasionally carries surface water during the rainy season from November to February/March. Khan's catchment area including its tributaries Slang and Etiro stretches over 8,400 square kilometres (3,200 sq mi).

The Khan has its origin near the settlement of Otjisemba, north-west of Okahandja. From there the river course passes westwards to the town of Usakos, and further in a south-western direction through the Namib desert. It has its confluence with the Swakop River 40 km east of Swakopmund.

It is a popular tourist attraction due to the proliferation of mammals such as the klipspringer antelope, ostriches and jackals.
