= Omatako Dam =

Dam in Namibia

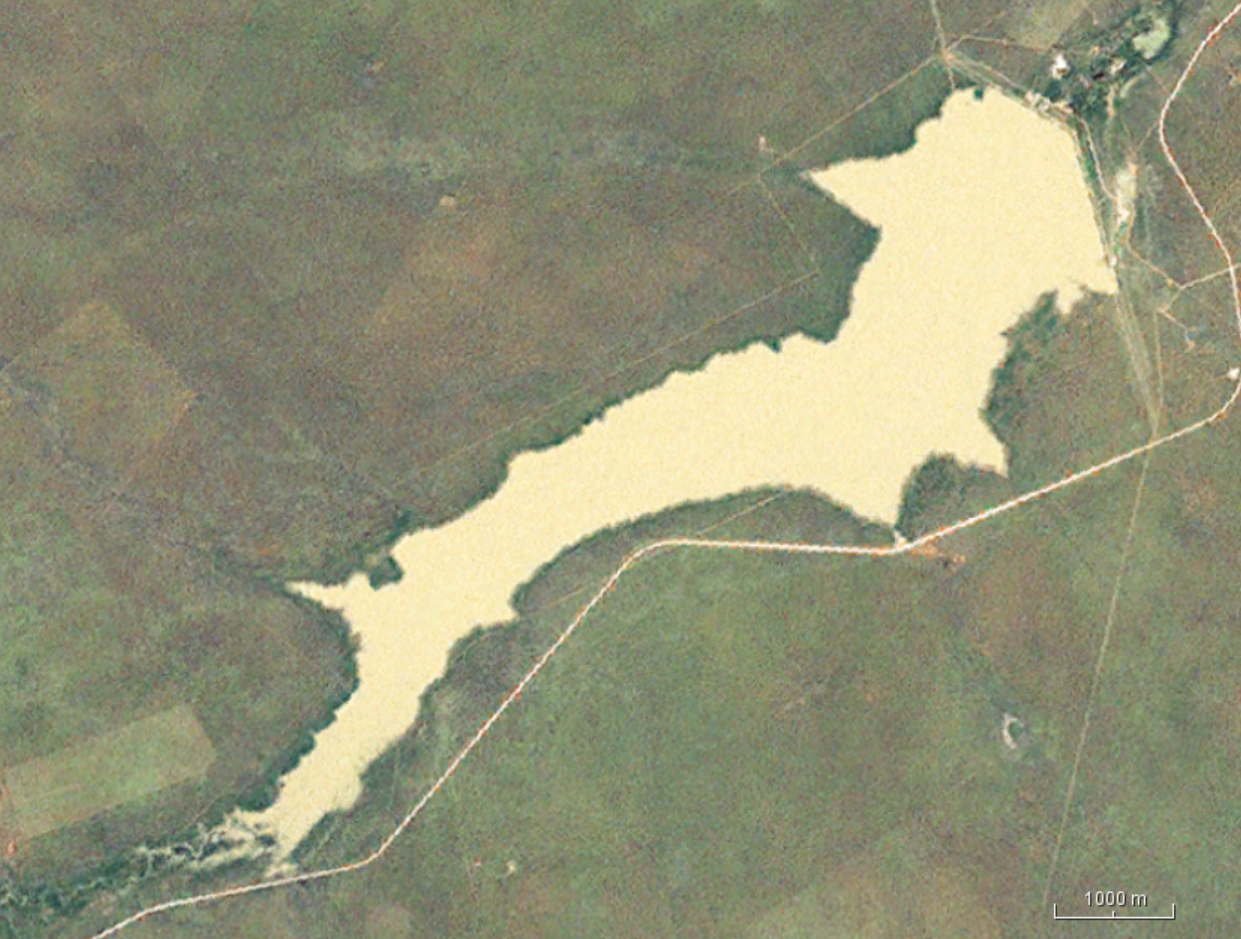

- Location within Namibia
- Official name: Omatako Dam
- Country: Namibia
- Location: 100 km (62 mi) north of Okahandja, Otjozondjupa Region
- Coordinates: 21°8′53.87″S 17°10′40.57″E
- Construction began: 1978
- Opening date: 1981

Dam and spillways
- Type of dam: Earth fill embankment
- Impounds: Omatako River
- Height: 16 m (52 ft)
- Length: 3,460 m (11,350 ft)
- Width (crest): 5 m (16 ft)
- Spillway type: Side chute
- Spillway capacity: 2,000 cubic metres per second (71,000 cu ft/s)

Reservoir
- Total capacity: 43.49 million cubic metres (56,880,000 cu yd)
- Surface area: 11.12 km^{2} (1,112 ha)

Omatako Dam is an earth-fill embankment dam about 100 kilometres (62 mi) north of Okahandja in the Otjozondjupa Region of Namibia. It is named after the Omatako Mountains, and it dams the ephemeral Omatako River, with Omatako meaning "butt" in Oshiwambo, the name referring to the shape of the Omatako Mountains. The dam has a capacity of 43.49 million cubic metres (56,880,000 cu yd).

Completed in 1981, it was originally envisaged to become part of the Eastern National Water Carrier, a scheme to supply water to Namibia's capital Windhoek from the Okavango River, 1,000 kilometres (620 mi) to the north on the Angolan border. The scheme was never completed. Omatako Dam today only contains floods and supplies water to the Von Bach Dam. As such, it is one of three dams supplying the capital Windhoek with water.
