= Usakos =

Usakos ǃŪsaǃkhōs (Khoekhoegowab) Okanduu (Otjiherero)
- Town
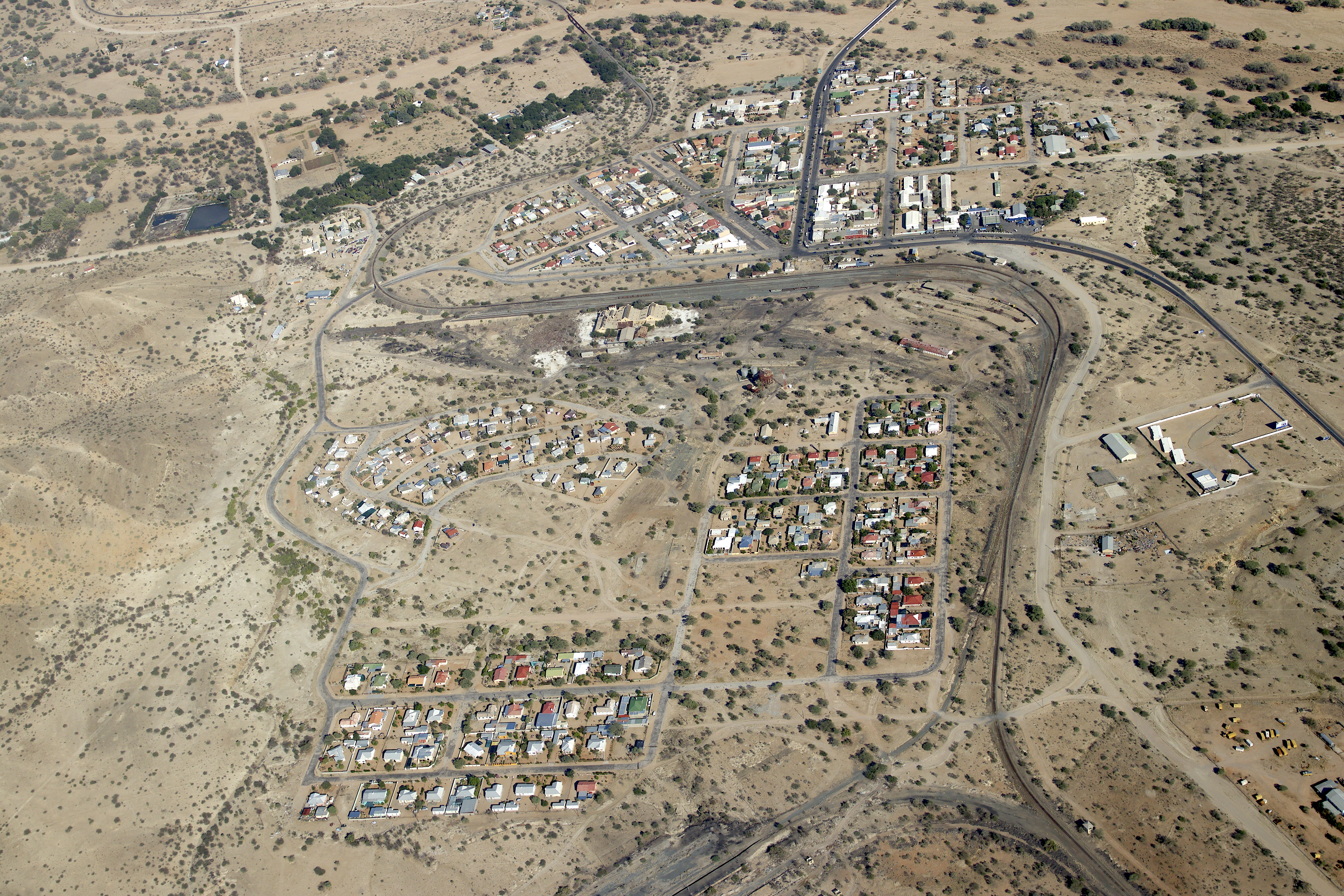
- Aerial photograph of Usakos (2018)

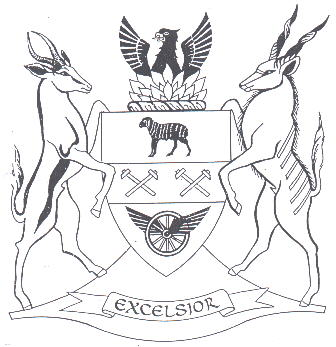
- Seal
- Motto: Excelsior
- Location in Namibia
- Coordinates: 22°0′S 15°36′E
- Country: Namibia
- Region: Erongo Region
- Constituency: Karibib Constituency
- Established: 1900s

Government
  - Mayor: Irene Simeon-Kurtz

Population (2023)
  - Total: 5,094
- Time zone: UTC+1 (South African Standard Time)
- Climate: BWh

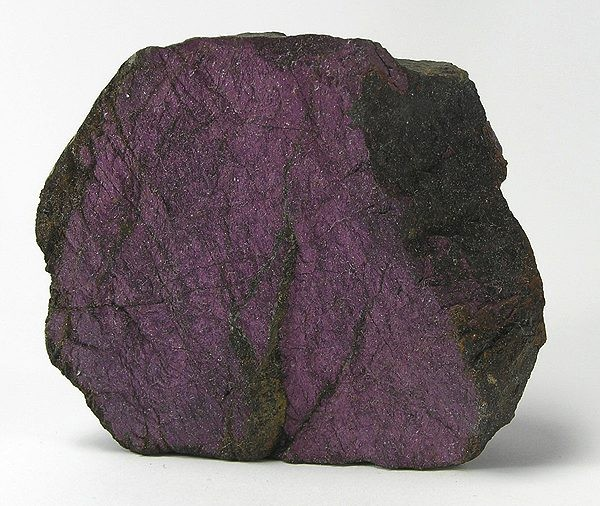
Purpurite, a very rare phosphate of manganese, from Sandamab pegmatite, Usakos, Namibia. Size: 5.4 x 4.6 x 1.9 cm.

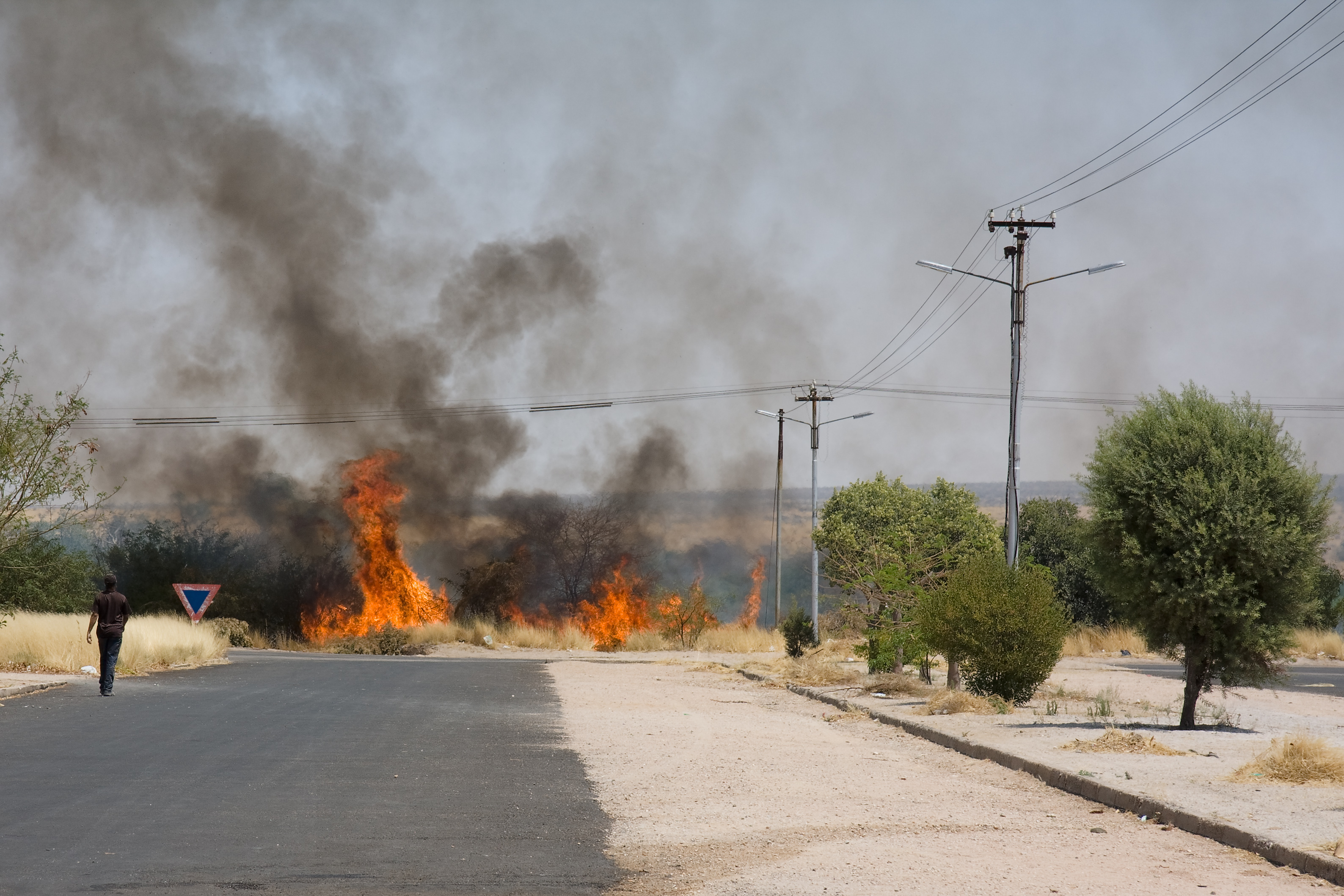
Bush fire in Usakos, 2009

Usakos (English: grab the heel, Otjiherero: Okanduu) is a town on the banks of river Khan, 140 kilometres north-east of Swakopmund in the Erongo Region of Namibia. It is located on the B2 (part of the Trans-Kalahari Corridor), the main road between the Walvis Bay and Johannesburg. The town has 5,094 inhabitants.

== Geography ==
Usakos townlands comprise 58 square kilometres (22 sq mi) of land. Surrounded by mountains, the town is quite picturesque. Certain spots around the town show the longest uninterrupted horizon in the world. It is the closest town to the Spitzkoppe, often referred to as the "Matterhorn of Namibia".

Historical population
Year	Pop.	±% p.a.
2001	2,962	—
2011	3,583	+1.92%
2023	5,094	+2.98%

== Economy and infrastructure ==
Usakos is riddled with poverty and alcohol abuse and the unemployment rate, as of 2012, was around 60%. Unlike other Namibian towns, it has not seen substantial development since independence in 1990.

Usakos Railway Station connects the town to the Namibian railway network.

== History ==
The settlement was founded in the early 1900s as a workshop and watering station for locomotives. Herero chief Samuel Maharero sold the land to Europeans who resold it in 1903 to the Otavi Minen- und Eisenbahngesellschaft (Otavi Mining and Railway Company) (OMEG) which operated an industrial railway line from Swakopmund to Tsumeb. OMEG established a railway station and a repair shop which was used until the 1960s. When mining operations slowed down, Usakos' importance faded quickly. Today it is just a drive-through from the Namibian inland to the coast.

Historic buildings and structures in Usakos are the Roman Catholic church (erected 1905), the now dilapidated railway station building, and the old hotel.

== Politics ==
Usakos was downgraded from municipal to town status in 2010. It is since then governed by a town council that has seven seats.

In the 2010 local authority election, a total of 1,029 votes were cast in the city. SWAPO won with approximately 47% of the vote. Of the three other parties seeking votes in the election, United Democratic Front (UDF) received approximately 31% of the vote, followed by RDP (17%) and COD (4%). SWAPO also won the 2015 local authority elections, gaining four seats (513 votes). Two seats went to the UDF (295 votes), and the remaining one to the Democratic Turnhalle Alliance (DTA, 76 votes).

In the 2020 local authority election SWAPO won again over each individual opposition party but lost the majority of seats in the town council. SWAPO obtained 398 votes and gained three seats. Two seats went to the UDF which gained 260 votes, and one seat each went to the Independent Patriots for Change (IPC, newly formed in August 2020) with 163 votes and the Popular Democratic Movement (PDM, the new name of the DTA since 2017) with 78 votes.

== Notable residents ==
Usakos is the hometown of the following prominent politicians:

- Michael Goreseb, former member of the National Assembly of Namibia
- Theo-Ben Gurirab former Speaker of the National Assembly
- Tsudao Gurirab, former Member of Parliament from 1999 to 2009
- Alpheus ǃNaruseb, former Minister of Land and Resettlement

== See also ==
- Usakos Reformed Church (NGK)
