= Von Bach Dam =

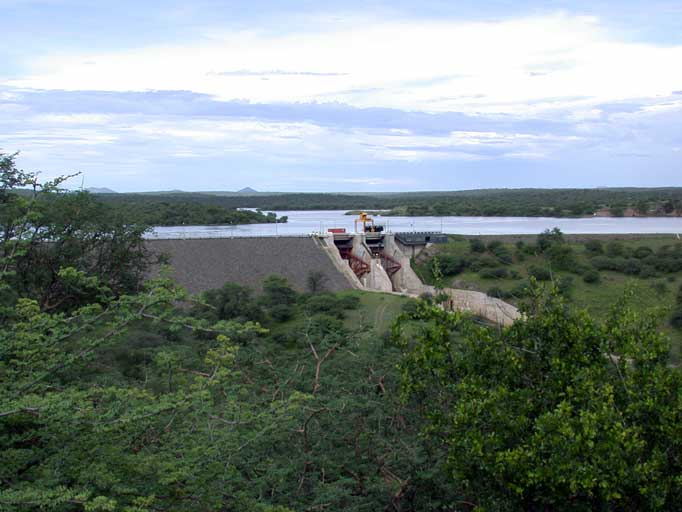

- Location within Namibia
- Official name: Von Bach Dam
- Country: Namibia
- Location: Okahandja, Otjozondjupa Region
- Coordinates: 22°0′50.49″S 16°57′12.73″E
- Construction began: 1968
- Opening date: 1970

Dam and spillways
- Type of dam: Embankment, rock-fill
- Impounds: Swakop River
- Height: 35 m (115 ft)
- Height (foundation): 40 m (130 ft)
- Length: 270 m (890 ft)
- Width (crest): 7 m (23 ft)
- Spillway type: Chute

Reservoir
- Total capacity: 48.56×10^{6} m^{3} (63,510,000 cu yd)
- Surface area: 4.89 km^{2} (1.89 mi^{2})

The Von Bach Dam (originally the Sartorius von Bach Dam) is a rock-fill embankment dam on the Swakop River near Okahandja in the Otjozondjupa Region of Namibia. Built in 1968 and commissioned in 1970, the dam provides Namibia's capital of Windhoek with much of the city's water. It also supplies Okahandja. The dam has a capacity of 48.56 million cubic metres (63,510,000 cu yd). Water from the reservoir is sent directly to a water treatment plant downstream. The treatment plant was completed in 1971 and upgraded in 1997.
