= List of bases of the Namibian Air Force =

The following is a list of bases of the Namibian Air Force.

== Current Bases ==
Map of Namibia showing the Namibian Air Force bases (Click on base icon for link to details)

Base	Location
Grootfontein Air Base	19°35′41″S 18°07′33″E
Karibib Air Base	21°51′15″S 53°44′01″E

== See also ==
- Namibian Air Force
