= Kamanya (surname) =

Kamanya is a surname, and may refer to:

- Selma Kamanya, Miss Namibia for 2018
- Paavo Kamanya, a Namibian military officer
- Claver Kamanya, a Tanzanian sprinter
