= Teofilus Shaende =

Namibian military officer (born 1977)

- Born: 26 June 1977 (age 49); Okambembe, Namibia
- Military career
- Allegiance: Namibia
- Branch: Namibian Air Force
- Service years: 1999 – present (27 years, 9 months)
- Rank: Air Vice Marshal
- Commands: Namibian Air Force; 23 Squadron
- Awards: Air Force Commander’s Exemplary Medal

Air Vice Marshal Teofilus Shaende is a Namibian military officer who is serving as the commander of the Namibian Air Force since 2020.

== Civilian career ==
After completing school at Dr. Lemmer High School in Rehoboth, Shaende took employment with the Ministry of Finance as a taxation officer. He resigned to join the military in 1999 as a recruit.

== Military career ==
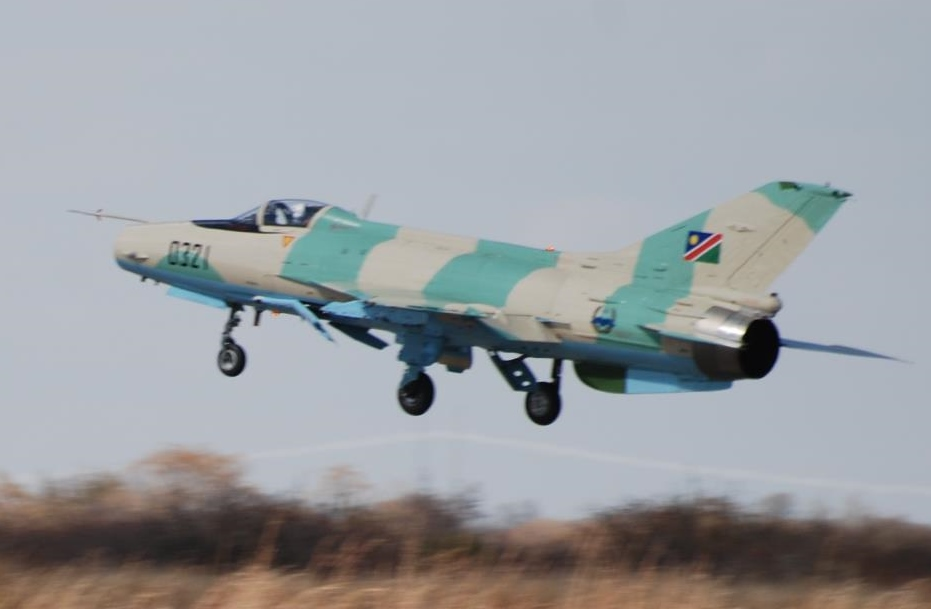
F-7 jet, a type flown by Shaende

Shaende joined the Namibian Defence Force in 1999 and undertook his six–months basic military training at the Osona Military School. After completion he did his private pilot's license at the Westair flying training centre and received receiving his pilots wings in the same year. In 2001 he undertook the formative junior officers course in Okahandja at the military school. In 2003 he then went to Zambia where he did the conversion and operation flying course with the Zambian Air Force. In 2004 he did the Qualified Flying Instructor (QFI) course with the Zambian Air Force.

In 2005 he was a Captain and appointed as second in command of 23 Squadron. In 2006 he was sent to China in preparation of Namibia's purchase of the F7-FT7 jet aircraft from Chengdu Aircraft Industry Group and did the FT-7 & F-7 aircraft ground school training. In 2008 he received a diploma of training in FT & F7 flying course in Namibia after qualifying on the F-7/FT-7 fighter jets, while in 2009 he did the K-8 instructor training. In February 2010 he was promoted to lieutenant colonel and appointed as air defence wing commanding officer during the commissioning of the F7 and FT7 fighter aircraft at Grootfontein Air Force Base. Afterwards he was promoted to Group captain following the reorganization of air force ranks and appointed as Chief of staff: Air operations & training at the air force headquarters. In 2016 after the deployment to India as defence attache of Air Commodore Paavo Kamanya. He was promoted to Air Commodore and appointed as deputy air force commander. On 1 April 2020 he was promoted to Air Vice Marshal and appointed air force commander.

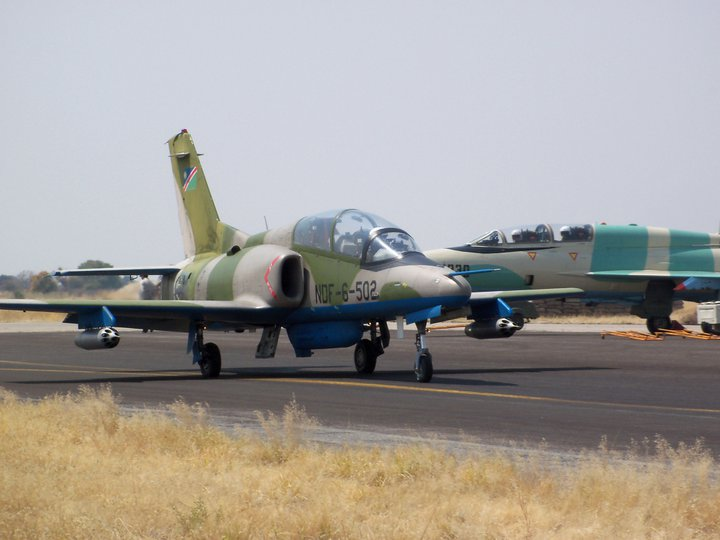
K-8 jet, a type flown by Shaende

== Qualifications ==
- Certificate in Management Skills New Vision Consultancy
- 2012 Diploma in Defence and Security Studies, University of Zambia
- 2012 Diploma Defence & Security Management Course, Defence Academy of the United Kingdom
- Certificate in Aviation Security Management and Organization, International Air Transport Association
- Certificate in Security Risk & Crisis Management and Bomb Threat Assessment, International Air Transport Association
- Certificate in Aviation Safety West Side Aviation South Africa
- 2013 Diploma Defence and Security Management Course, Command and Staff College Zambia
- 2014 Strike Operational Conversion, Karibib Air Force Base
- 2016 Diploma in Security and Strategic Studies, National Defence College United Republic of Tanzania
- 2016 Diploma in Security and Strategic Studies, University of Dar Es Salaam
- 2018 Basic Military Law Course, Military School

== Honours and decorations ==
- Commendation Certificate for hard work
- Air Cadre medal
- Air Force Longevity medal
- Air Force Commander's exemplary medal
- NDF 10 years service medal
- NDF 20 Years Service medal

Military offices
Preceded by Martin Pinehas	Namibian Air Force; 1 April 2020 – incumbent	Succeeded by Incumbent
Preceded by Air Commodore Paavo Kamanya	Deputy Commander Namibian Air Force; 1 January 2016 – 31 March 2020	Succeeded by Air Commodore Abed Hihepa
