= Commander of the Air Force (Namibia) =

The commander of the Air Force is the professional head of the Namibian Air Force. The current commander of the Air Force is Air Vice-Marshal Teofilus Shaende.

== List of commanders ==
Air Force Commanders
Name	Term Start	Term End	President
Colonel George Kaxuxuena	1994	1998	Sam Nujoma
Air Vice-Marshal Martin Pinehas	2002	1 June 2020	Sam Nujoma Hifikepunye Pohamba Hage Geingob
Air Vice-Marshal Teofilus Shaende	1 June 2020	Present	Hage Geingob Nangolo Mbumba Netumbo Nandi-Ndaitwah

== See also ==
- Namibian Defence Force
