= School of Air Power Studies =

Training institution of the Namibian Air Force

- Active: 2015
- Country: (Namibia)
- Branch: Namibian Air Force
- Role: flight training, Technical & Leadership Training
- Current Base: Grootfontein Air Force Base, Grootfontein
- Mottos: Syrma, Bulla Pro Excellentia

Commanders
- Current commander: Group Captain

The School of Air Power Studies is the premier training institution of the Namibian Air Force. It is located at the Grootfontein Air Force Base. For vocational training the initial phase is carried out at Eros Airport in Windhoek.

== History ==
At the onset of the formation of the Namibian Defence Force Air Wing there was no capacity to train pilots and maintenance technicians. An agreement with the Namibian Aviation Training Academy was forged. The academy was responsible for providing flight training to aspirant pilots and maintenance training to aspirant technicians. President Hifikepunye Pohamba inaugurated the school on 13 February 2015. The school was set up in stages the first phase was the Aircraft Technical Training Centre.

== Training ==
The school is set up in three Wings.

=== Flight Training Centre ===
The flight training centre is responsible for training flight personnel for the Air Force. It converts helicopter pilots using the HAL Cheetah platforms as well pilots into fighter pilots using the K-8 Platforms

=== Leadership and Academic Training Wing ===
The leadership Wing is responsible for academic training for Air Force Members. It trains from Non Commissioned Officers as well as Commissioned Officers.

=== Technical Training Center ===
Located at the Grootfontein AFB the centre provides vocational training to technicians. It has electrical / electronic laboratories, aircraft systems simulators to train on training on fixed wing aircraft and helicopters for training. The centre caters for technical training of the Air force's ground personnel. Students from SADC Air Forces have also been accepted to institution'. Its curriculum are run in conjunction with the Namibian Aviation Training Academy. Qualifications offered include certificates and three year diplomas in:

- Armament, Ground Support Equipment and Ejection Seat Trade
- Aircraft Maintenance, Technician-Electric and Instrument Avionics Trade
- Aircraft Maintenance Technician Airframe and Power-Plant trade

Maintenance training is carried out in three phases, phase one(vocational training) is done over 35 weeks in Windhoek, phase two (professional training) is carried out for 60 weeks in Grootfontein and phase three (test trade preparation) is done for 7 weeks at Grootfotein Technical Training Centre.
