= George Kaxuxuena =

Namibian military officer

George Mwauvikange Kaxuxuena
- Born: 13 February 1955; Namibia (then South-West Africa, South Africa)
- Died: 15 February 2021 (aged 66)
- Military career
- Allegiance: Namibia
- Branch: Namibian Army
- Service years: 1970s–2016
- Rank: Colonel
- Commands: Air Wing Commander (1994–1998)
- Conflicts: Namibian War of Independence

Colonel George Mwauvikange Kaxuxuena (13 February 1955 – 27 February 2021) was a Namibian military officer who served as Namibian Defence Force Air Wing Commander.

== Career ==
Kaxuxuena's military career began in 1970s when he joined the People's Liberation Army of Namibia (PLAN) in exile participating in the liberation struggle. He served at the North East Front as a Front Commander. He was repatriated to Namibia under the UNTAG programme and began his career in the Namibian Army. He was appointed in 1994 as the first NDF Air Wing Commander serving in the position until 1998.

== Retirement ==
After retirement he was appointed as chief executive officer of August 26 Holdings. Colonel Kaxuxuena had a Master of Science degree in Defence from the Department of Defence and Strategic Studies at the University of Madras in India. He died on 15 February 2021, was given a State funeral and interred at Eenhana Memorial Shrine on 27 February 2021.

== Honours and decorations ==
- Namibian Army Pioneer Medal
