= Paavo Kamanya =

Namibian military officer

Paavo Elwin Paul Kamanya
- Born: 1960's Namibia
- Military career
- Allegiance: Namibia
- Branch: Namibian Air Force
- Service years: 1980 – present (46 years, 9 months)
- Rank: Air Commodore
- Commands: Deputy Air Force Commander Grootfontein AFB Commander VR1 Squadron Commander
- Conflicts: Namibian War of Independence Second Congo War
- Awards: Most distinguished order of Namibia

Air Commodore Paavo Elwin-Paul Kamanya is a retired Namibian military officer who last served as Defence Attaché to India. He previously served as deputy Namibian Air Force Commander.

== Military career ==
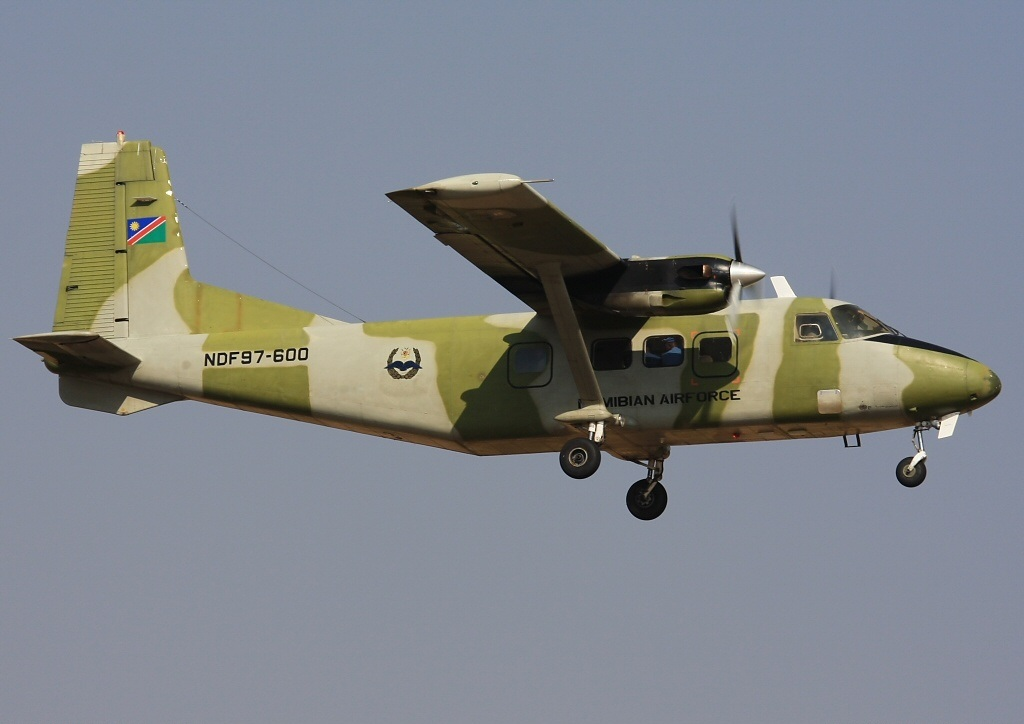
Y-12, a type flown by Kamanya

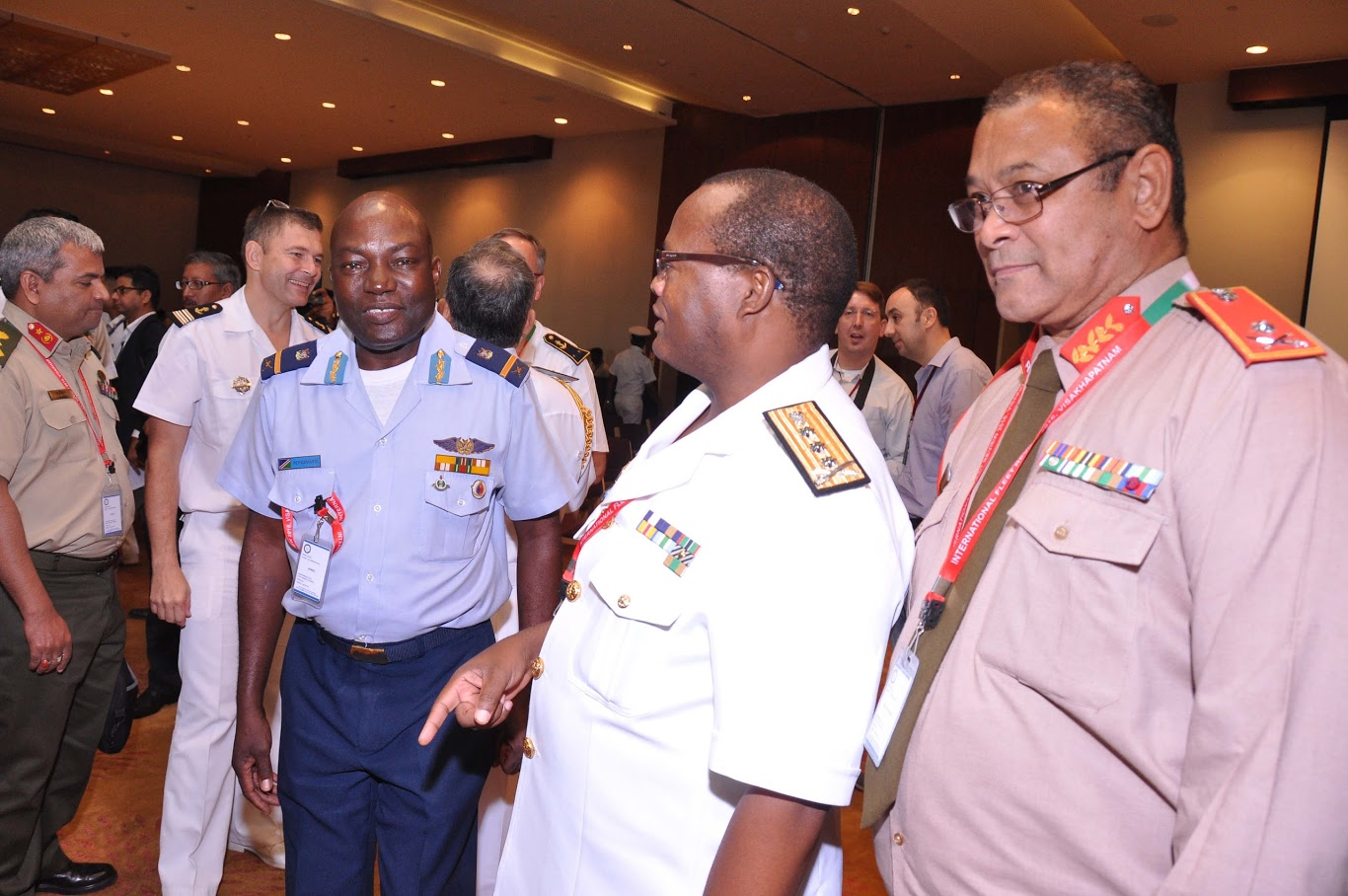
Air Cdre Kamanya (in blue) at the 2016 Indian International Fleet Review

Kamanya is a veteran of the national liberation movement under SWAPO. He joined the Namibian Defence Force (NDF) and is a pioneer of the NDF Air Wing. During Namibia's deployment to the Democratic Republic of the Congo he also participated in the Second Congo War, flying resupply missions, including resupply to besieged Namibian and Zimbabwean troops at Ikela. During one of the flights a technician was mortally wounded. Instead of turning back he proceeded with the flight to Ikela. For his actions president Sam Nujoma awarded him the Most Distinguished Order of Namibia.

He was appointed as the VR1 Squadron commanding officer, later he served as commanding officer stationed at Grootfontein Air Force Base. In the 2010s he was promoted to colonel and made deputy Air Force commander. In January 2016 he was posted to India as Defence Attaché and was replaced by Air Commodore Teofilus Shaende as deputy Air Force Commander. Later he was transferred to Sri Lanka as Defence Attaché.

== Honours and decorations ==
- Most Distinguished Order of Namibia
- DRC Campaign Medal
- DRC Campaign Medal
- NDF Commendation Medal
- Twenty Years Service Medal

Military offices
Unknown	Deputy Air Force Commander unknown date – 31 December 2015	Succeeded by Air Commodore Teofilus Shaende
