= Namibian Air Force =

Air warfare branch of Namibia's military

- Emblem of the Namibian Air Force
- Founded: 13 March 2005; 21 years ago
- Country: Namibia
- Type: Air force
- Role: Aerial warfare Airlift; Military education and training Support humanitarian aid operations Support maritime patrol
- Size: 3,000
- Part of: Namibian Defence Force
- Headquarters: Karibib, Erongo Region, Namibia
- Anniversaries: 23 July 1994 as the Namibian Defence Force Air Wing; 13 March 2005 as the Namibian Air Force
- Engagements: Second Congo War Angolan Civil War

Commanders
- Commander-In-Chief: Netumbo Nandi-Ndaitwah
- Minister of Defence: Frans Kapofi
- Air Force Commander: Air Vice Marshal Teofilus Shaende

Insignia
- Fin flash

- Flag

Aircraft flown
- Fighter: Chengdu F-7
- Helicopter: Mil Mi-8, Harbin Z-9, Aérospatiale SA 315B Lama, Aérospatiale Alouette III
- Attack helicopter: Mil Mi-24
- Trainer: K-8, Chengdu F-7
- Transport: Antonov An-26, Shaanxi Y-9, Harbin Y-12

The Namibian Air Force is the air force branch of the Namibian Defence Force. It was commissioned on 13 March 2005 at Grootfontein Air Force Base.

Following the independence of Namibia from South Africa in 1990, the Air Defence Wing of the Namibian Defence Force was established on 23 July 1994. The Air Force headquarters is located at Karibib Air Force Base.

The policy, mission statements and concept of operations envisage the development of an Air Force to operate in support of the Army and the Navy.

The five separate roles for the Air Force are: surveillance, transport of personnel and transport of supplies/equipment, support to the civil authorities or civil community, and training.

The policy for the Air Force is as follows:

To acquire dedicated air assets to undertake the surveillance and transport tasks. The MOD and NDF will train and employ their own pilots and technicians. Co-operation and co-ordination with other Ministries may extend to making such assets available for non-defence tasking. In addition, consideration will be given to arrangements whereby private and other national air assets could be employed where appropriate or necessary.

== History ==
After commissioning in 1994, the air wing was composed of two squadrons, VR-1 squadron and the Helicopter Squadron. Colonel George Kaxuxuena was appointed as the first Air Wing Commander. The first aircraft of the Air Wing were six Cessna O-2As donated by the United States. The US also offered two advisors to train four pilots, six copilots and seven mechanics. In December 1994 a total of four Cheetah and Chetak light utility helicopters bought from Hindustan Aeronautics Limited were delivered to the then Air Wing at Eros Airport.

The Indian Air Force also provided a chief engineer, five technicians and two pilots to train Namibian crews for at least six months. Two Harbin Y-12s were delivered in December 1997.

In the 1999-2000 period, two Mil Mi-8s and two Mil Mi-25s were delivered by Libya. In 2004, Namibia ordered 12 Chengdu F-7NM fighters and two FT-7NM trainers from China. These were delivered in 2005 and 2006, and officially entered service on 23 June of the latter year.

== Aircraft ==
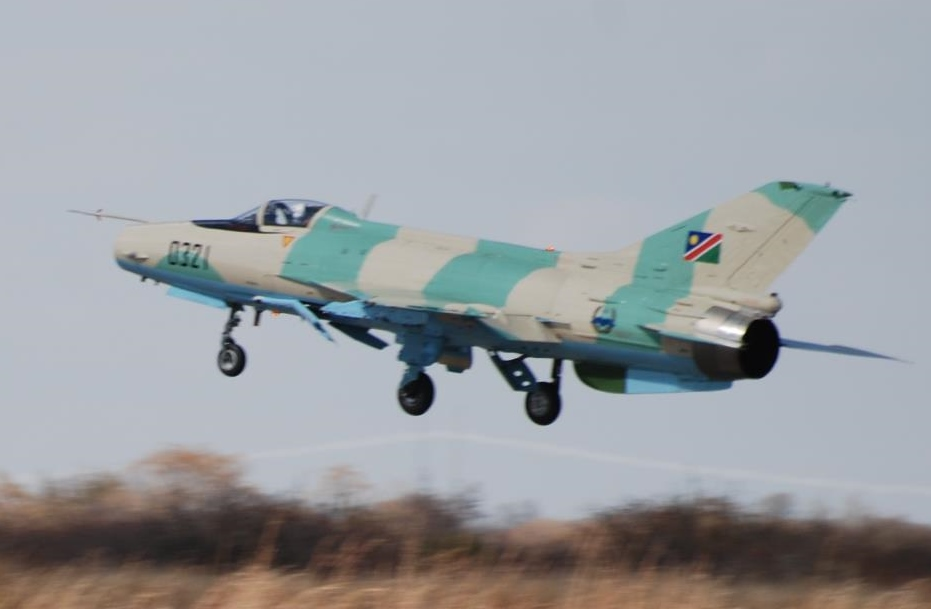
An F-7 landing

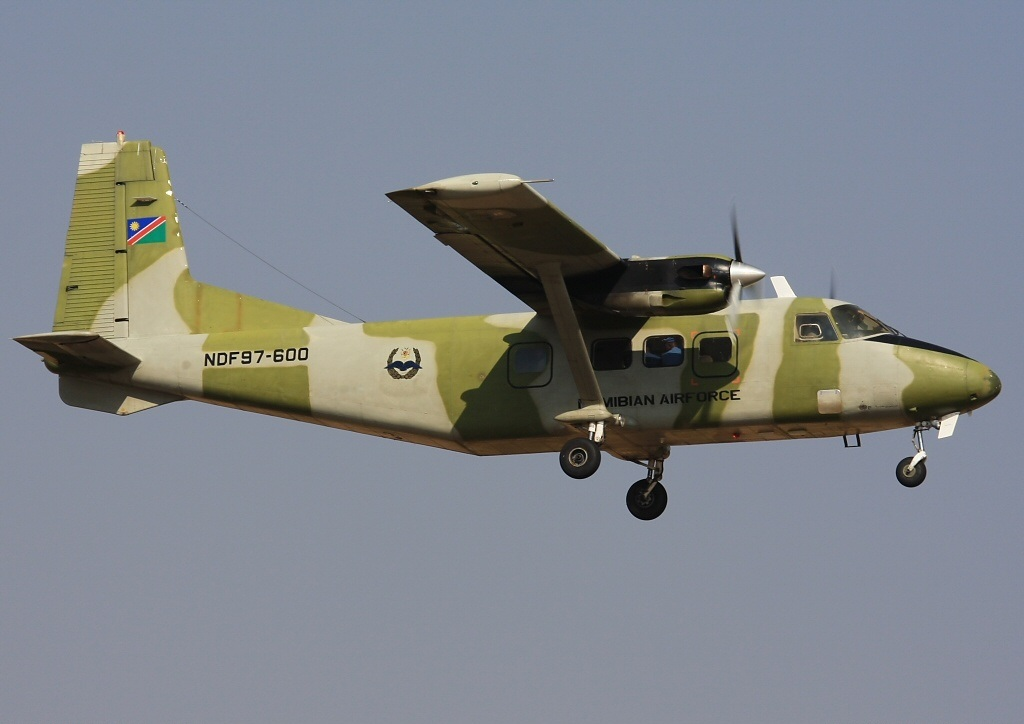
A Harbin Y-12 on final approach

Aircraft	Origin	Type	Variant	In service	Notes
Combat aircraft
Chengdu F-7	China	Fighter	F-7NM	9	
Transport
Antonov An-26	Soviet Union	Transport		1	
Shaanxi Y-9	China	Transport		2	
Harbin Y-12	China	Transport		2	
Helicopters
Mil Mi-8	Soviet Union	Transport / Utility		2	
Mil Mi-24	Soviet Union	Attack		2	
HAL Cheetah	France / India	Liaison / Utility		1	
Harbin Z-9	China	Liaison / Utility		1	
HAL Chetak	France / India	Liaison / Utility		3	
Trainer aircraft
Hongdu JL-8	China	Jet trainer	K-8	11	
Chengdu F-7	China	Jet trainer	FT-7	2	

=== Aircraft accidents ===
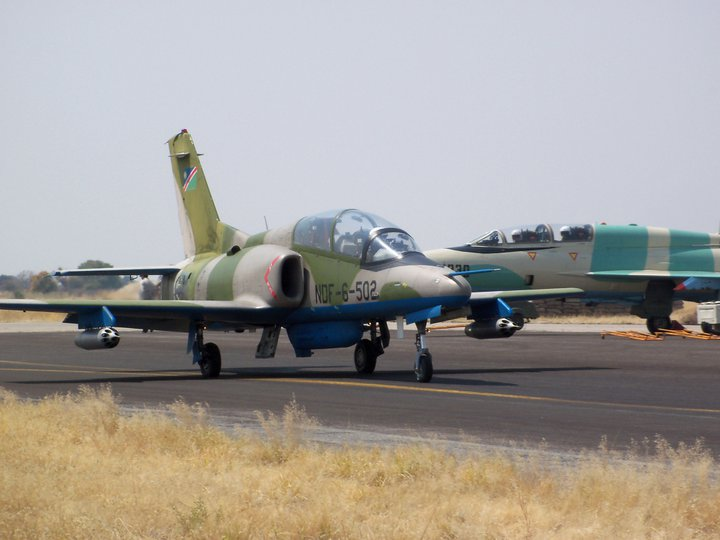
K-8 taxiing with centerline gun pod and rocket pods attached

The Namibian Air Force has suffered a number of aircraft incidents and accidents.

- 15 January 1999: During Operation Atlantic in the DRC, where two helicopters — a Cheetah and a Chetak (serials H-702 and H-708) — collided mid-air during bad weather, resulting in the deaths of 11 personnel, five of whom were Namibian.
- On 1 August 2008: Chetak H-706 crashed resulting in injuries to the crews and passengers near Opuwo.
- On 30 November 2013: the An-26B registered as NAF-3-642 crash-landed at the disused Omega airfield in Zambezi Region, with the six crew members getting away unhurt. The aircraft was flying to Bagani to collect the remains of the occupants of LAM Mozambique Airlines Flight 470.
- On 11 April 2014: A Harbin Z-9 Helicopter crashed during take off at Grootfontein Air Force Base.
- On 23 September 2021: a Hongdu JL-8 crashed during landing at Karibib Air Force Base.
- On 15 October 2021: the Chengdu F-7NM with serial number 0315 crashed on landing at the Andimba Toivo ya Toivo Airport. The cause was allegedly a failure of the safety parachute to deploy upon deceleration.

== Air Force Bases ==
Map of Namibia showing the Namibian Air Force bases (Click on base icon for link to details)

List of bases of the Namibian Air Force

- Karibib Air Force Base, Karibib
- Grootfontein Air Force Base, Grootfontein

== Units ==
Air Defence Wing

- 23 Squadron

Fighter squadron, operating Chengdu F-7s.

10 Wing

- 10 Squadron

Primary Maintenance Squadron of the Air Force

15 Wing

- 153 Squadron

Operates the helicopters. This squadron participated in the Second Congo War. In 1999, it lost two helicopters in a mid-air collision.

13 Wing

- Transport Squadron

Hosting the fixed-wing transport aircraft (An-26, Y-9E and Y-12).

Air Force Regiment
Is the specialized ground combat branch within the air force. Its primary mission is to seize, secure, and defend airfields, protect aviation assets, and provide ground-based defense to enable air and space operation.

== Deployments ==
=== National ===
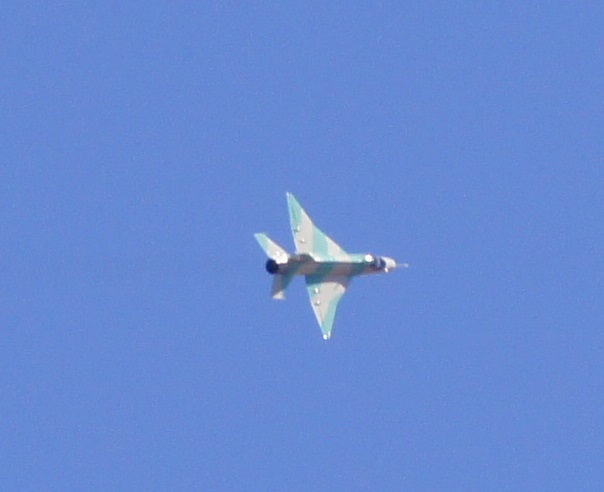
A Namibian F-7

The Namibian Air Force has deployed numerous times to help civilian authorities during disasters. Health outreach workers have been ferried during immunisation campaigns. It has assisted in transporting electoral material and personnel during national elections. It has also flown foreign heads of state during their stay in Namibia.

=== International ===
==== Democratic Republic of the Congo ====
Between 1998 and 2002 the air force was deployed to the DRC during the Second Congo War. Harbin Y-12 transport aircraft were used on logistics supply missions to the DRC as well as withdrawing Namibian troops at the end of the war. On 1 August 1999 an air force flight engineer died after he was hit by anti-aircraft fire on a Harbin Y-12 that was en route to resupply Namibian and Zimbabwean troops besieged at Ikela. Two Namibian Alouette helicopters collided in mid-air while on operations during the war due to bad weather on 15 January 1999. The accident claimed nine lives, including two Namibian pilots and three technicians.

==== Zimbabwe ====
During the 2014 floods at Tokwe-Murkosi in Masvingo, Zimbabwe, the air force deployed a flight consisting of one Harbin Z-9 and two Alouettes to assist with the evacuation of the affected people. The mission lasted seven days in which 600 residents were airlifted, as well as 56 tons of goods.

==== Exercise Blue Kavango ====
The air force deployed a composite flight consisting of a Y-12 transport aircraft and aZ-9 light utility helicopters to the SADC air forces exercise Blue Kavango held in Botswana.

==== Exercise Blue Lugwasho ====
The Air Force deployed a pair of K-8 Fighter Trainers to Exercise Blue Lugwasho held in Zambia in September 2025.

== Leadership ==
The Air Force Commander exercises overall Executive command, he is deputized by an Air Commodore. The Air Force Sergeant Major is the principal Warrant Officer that advises the Air Force Commander on matters of discipline.

=== Command structure ===
Sleeve insignia	Appointment	Rank and Name
	Air Force Commander	Air Vice Marshal Teofilus Shaende
	Air Force Deputy Commander	Air Commodore Abed Hihepa

=== List of Air Force Commanders ===
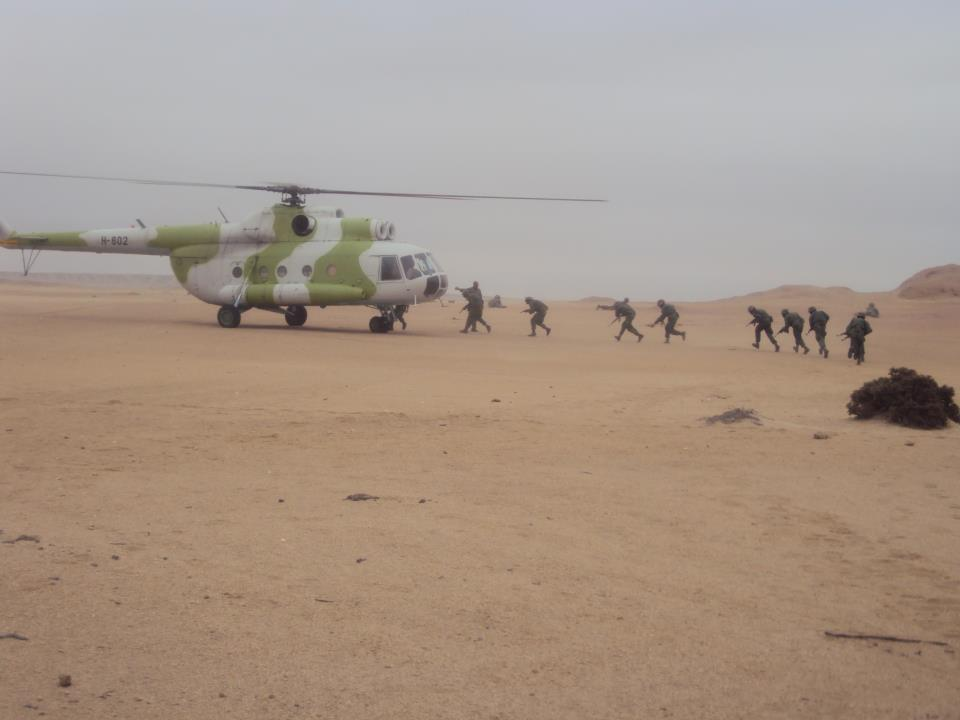
Navy Marines conducting Helicopter drills with Mi-17

== Other establishments and units ==
- School of Air Power Studies

The primary training institute in the Air Force is the School of Air Power Studies (SOAPS). The SOAPS is composed of three centres.

== Ranks and insignia ==
The Air Force used Army-styled ranks and insignia from inception. This however changed in April 2010 when the new system based on stripes was introduced and ranks changed to the Commonwealth system.

=== Commissioned officer ranks ===
The rank insignia of commissioned officers.

Rank group	General / flag officers				Senior officers			Junior officers
Namibian Air Force
Namibian Air Force	Chief air marshal	Air marshal	Air vice marshal	Air commodore	Group captain	Wing commander	Squadron leader	Flight lieutenant	Flying officer	Pilot officer

=== Other ranks ===
The rank insignia of non-commissioned officers and enlisted personnel.

Rank group	Senior NCOs				Junior NCOs		Enlisted
Namibian Air Force							No insignia
Namibian Air Force	Warrant officer class 1	Warrant officer class 2	Flight sergeant	Sergeant	Aircraftman	Leading aircraftman	Private (or equivalent)
