= Karibib Air Force Base =

Air base in Namibia

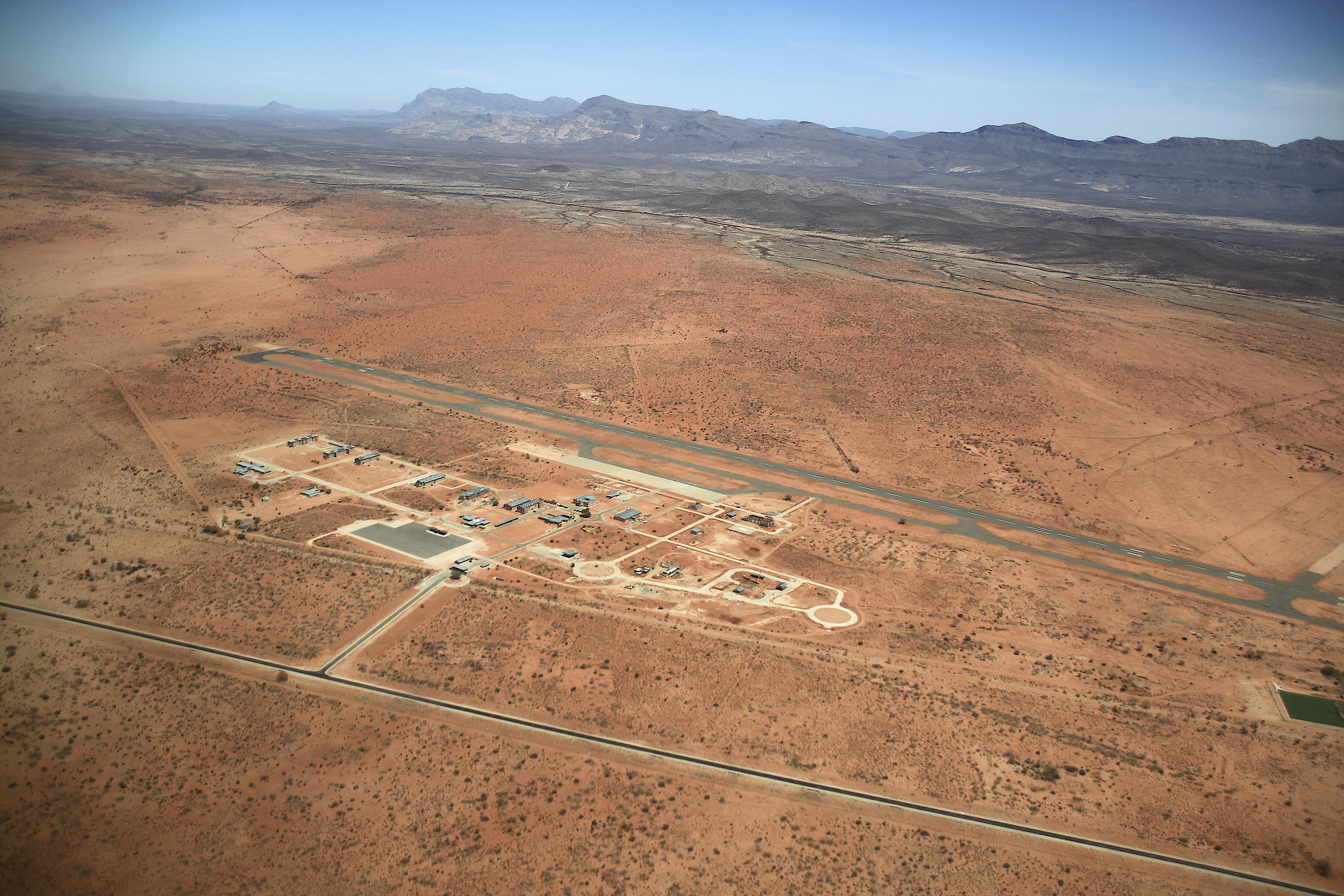
- Aerial view of Karibib Air Force Base (2019)
- IATA: KRB; ICAO: FYKA

Summary
- Airport type: Military
- Owner: Namibian Air Force
- Serves: Karibib
- Elevation AMSL: 3,829 ft / 1,167 m
- Coordinates: 21°50′52″S 15°54′10″E

Map
- Location in Namibia

Runways
Direction	Length		Surface
Direction	m	ft	Surface
08/26	2,548	8,360	Asphalt
16/34	1,170	3,839	Unpaved
- Source: Google Maps

Karibib Air Force Base (ICAO: FYKA) is an air base near the central Namibian town of Karibib. Since 2016, the headquarters of the Namibian Air Force are located here. Air Force Command had previously been at the Grootfontein Air Force Base.

== See also ==
- List of airports in Namibia
- Transport in Namibia
