= Grootfontein Air Force Base =

Air base in Grootfontein, Namibia

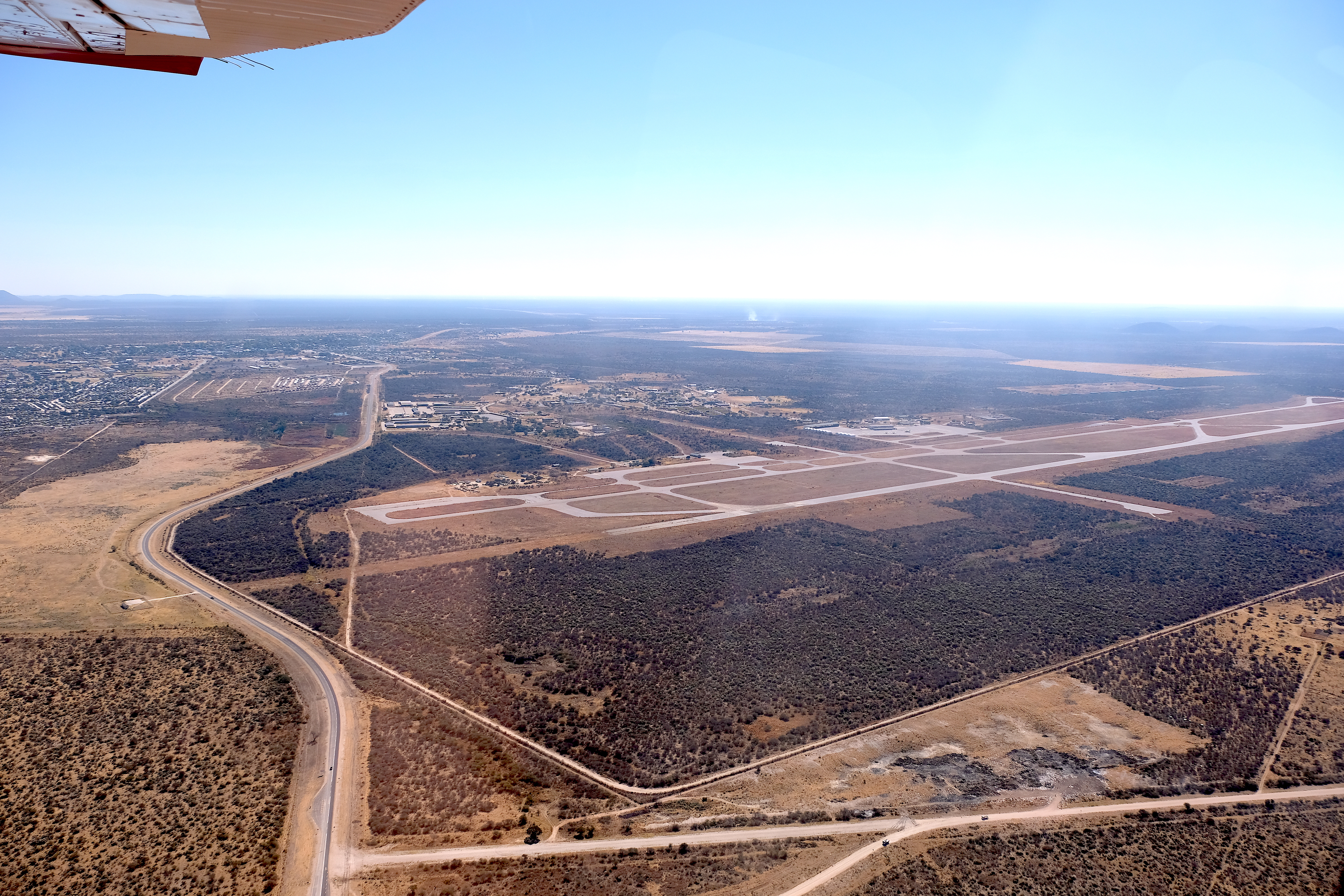
- IATA: GFY; ICAO: FYGF

Summary
- Airport type: Military
- Owner: Namibian Air Force
- Location: Grootfontein, Namibia
- Commander: Group Captain Hillary Lilungwe Sisamu
- Elevation AMSL: 4,636 ft (1,413 m)
- Coordinates: 19°36′07″S 18°07′21″E

Map
- Location of air base in Namibia

Runways
Direction	Length		Surface
Direction	m	ft	Surface
08/26	3,560	11,680	Asphalt
17/35	1,040	3,412	Asphalt
- Source: WAD GCM Google Maps

The Grootfontein Air Force Base (IATA: GFY, ICAO: FYGF) is an air base of the Namibian Air Force in Grootfontein, a town in the Otjozondjupa Region of Namibia. The air base is about 4 km (2 mi) south of the center of Grootfontein.

It was formerly an air base for the South African Air Force. It was also the headquarters of the Namibian Air Force until these were moved to Karibib Air Force Base in 2016.

The Grootfontein non-directional beacon (Ident: GF) and VOR-DME (Ident: GFV) are located on the field.

== Commanding officers ==
Grootfontein Air Force Base
From	Commanding Officer	To	Ribbon
Unknown date	Col Paavo Kamanya (Note: Later Air Commodore)	Unknown date	
Unknown date	Group Captain Abed Hihepa	1 March 2018	
1 March 2018	Group Captain Mackenzie Manfred Tjivera	28 July 2018	
28 July 2018	Group Captain Hillary Lilungwe Sisamu	Incumbent	

== Image gallery ==
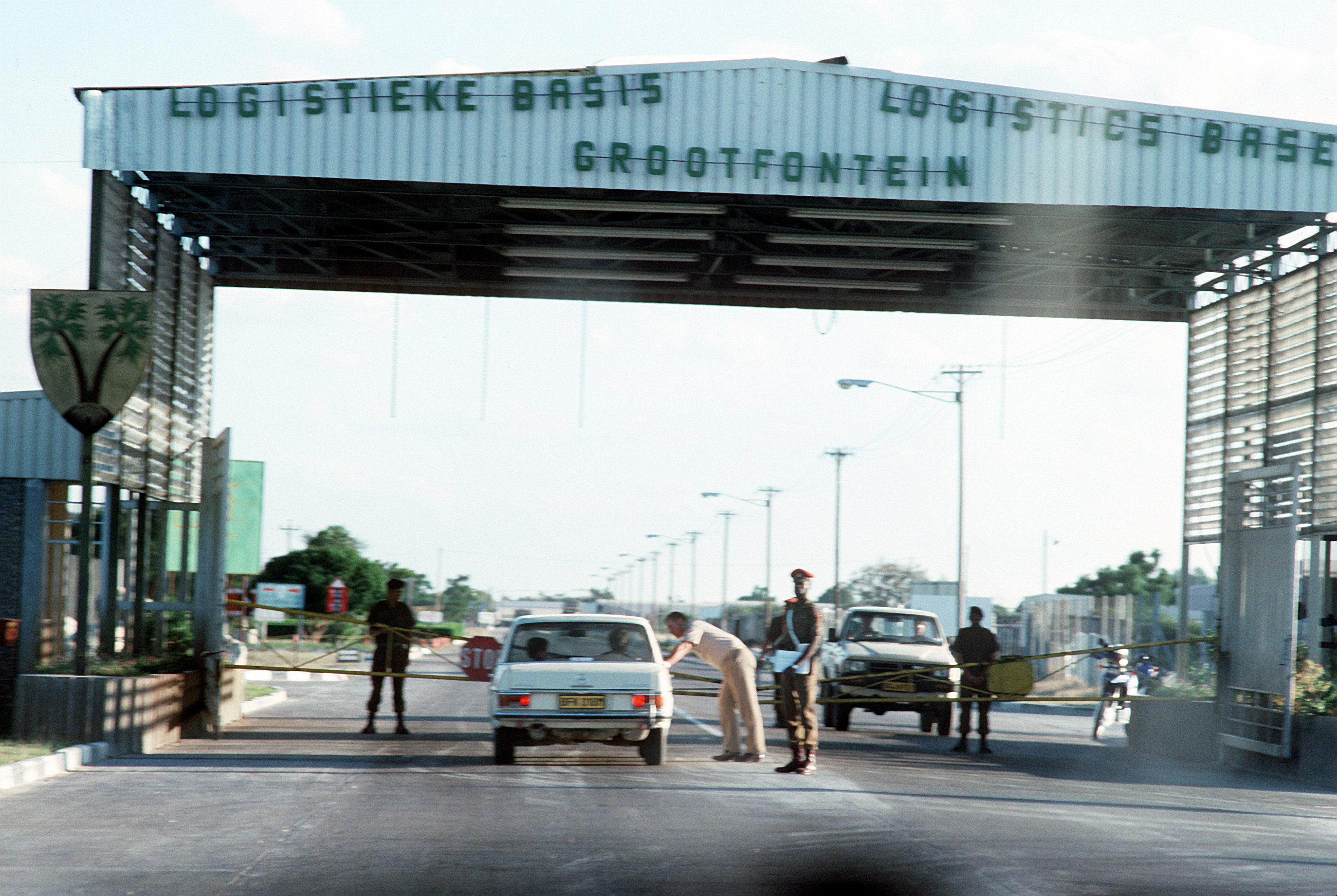
Entrance gate to the Grootfontein Logistics Base, April 1989.

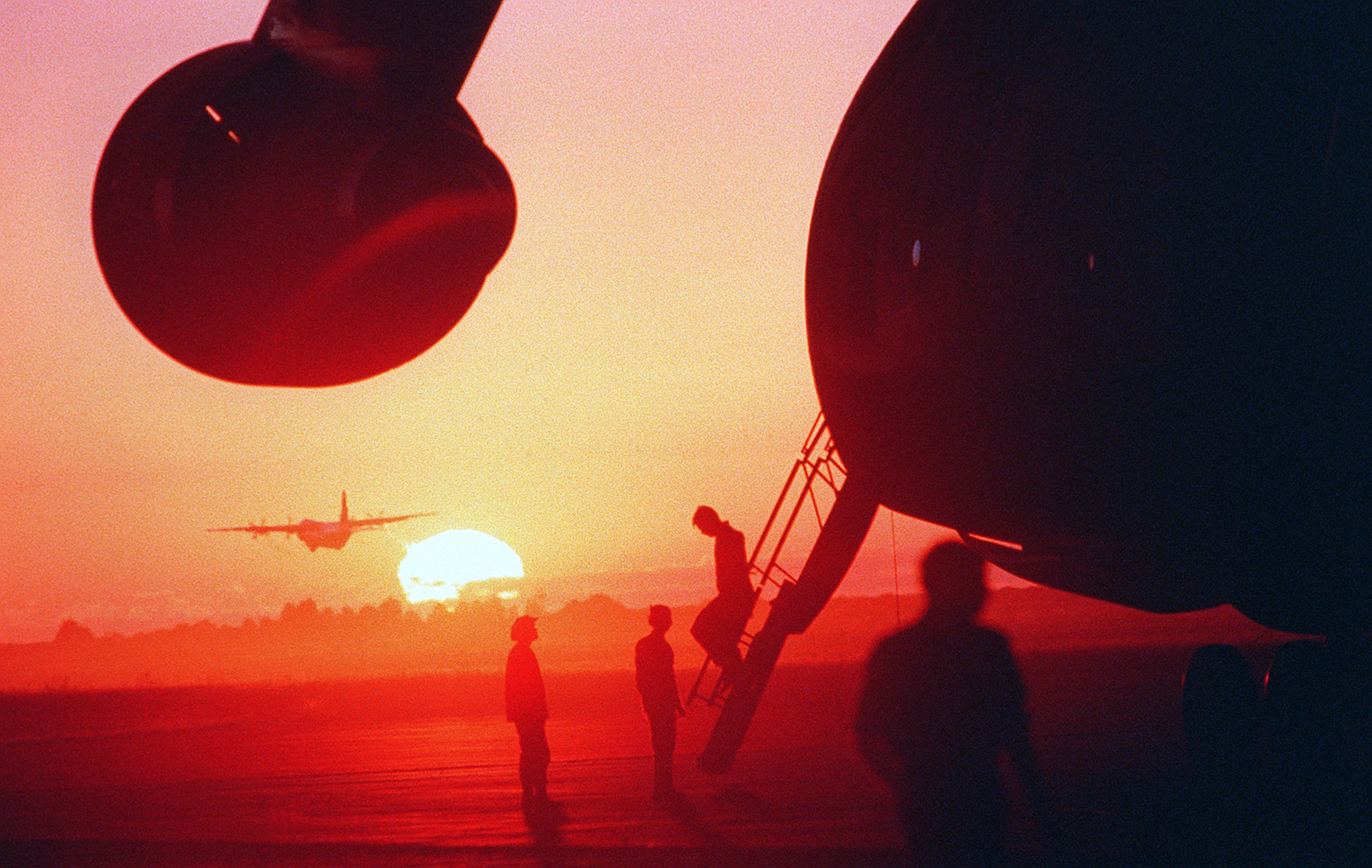
A C-130 Hercules aircraft takes off in the distance as a section of a Military Airlift Command C-5B Galaxy aircraft, foreground, is silhouetted by the morning sun at Grootfontein Logistics Base.

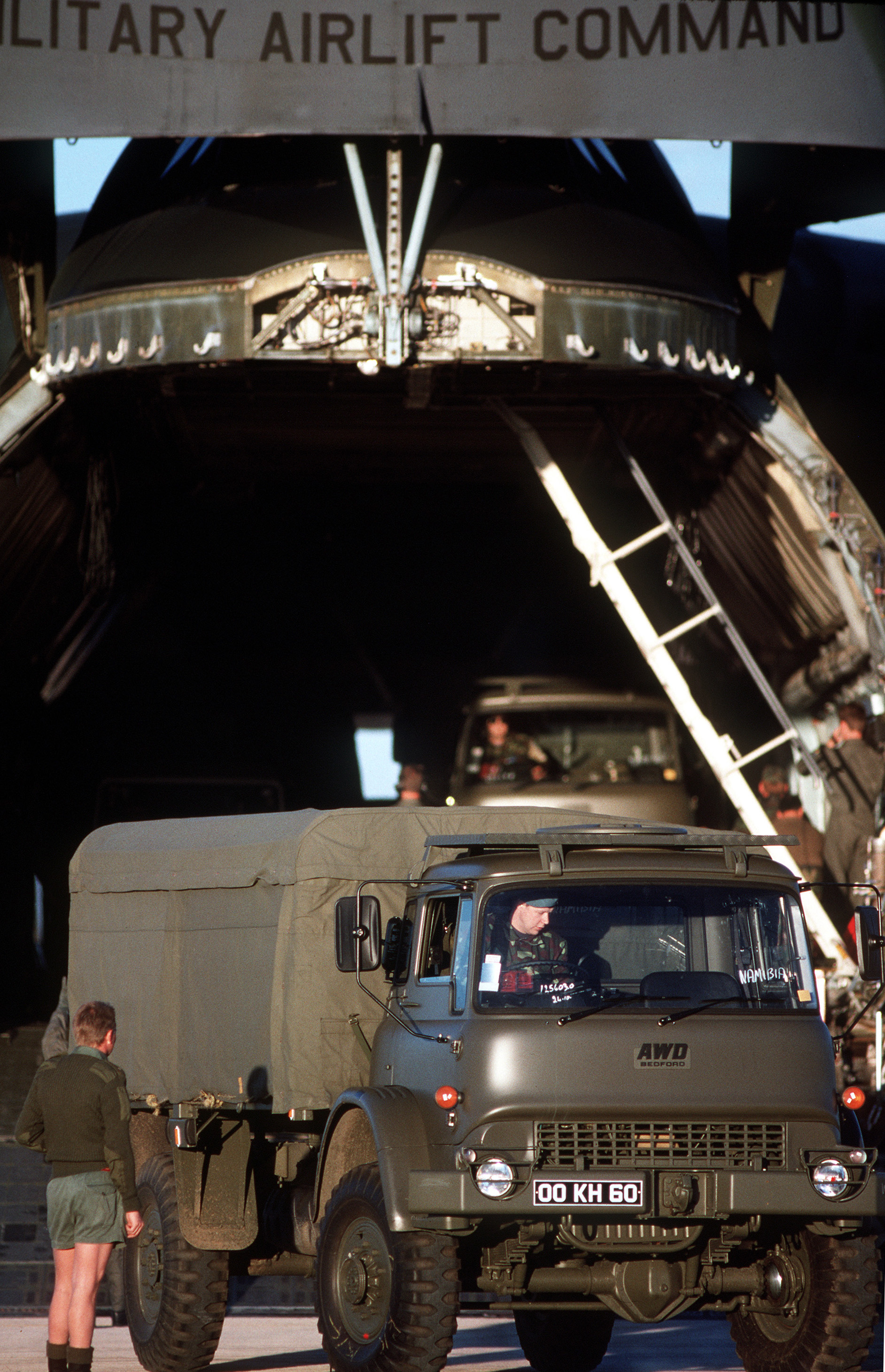
British Bedford 4x4 being loaded from a military aircraft.

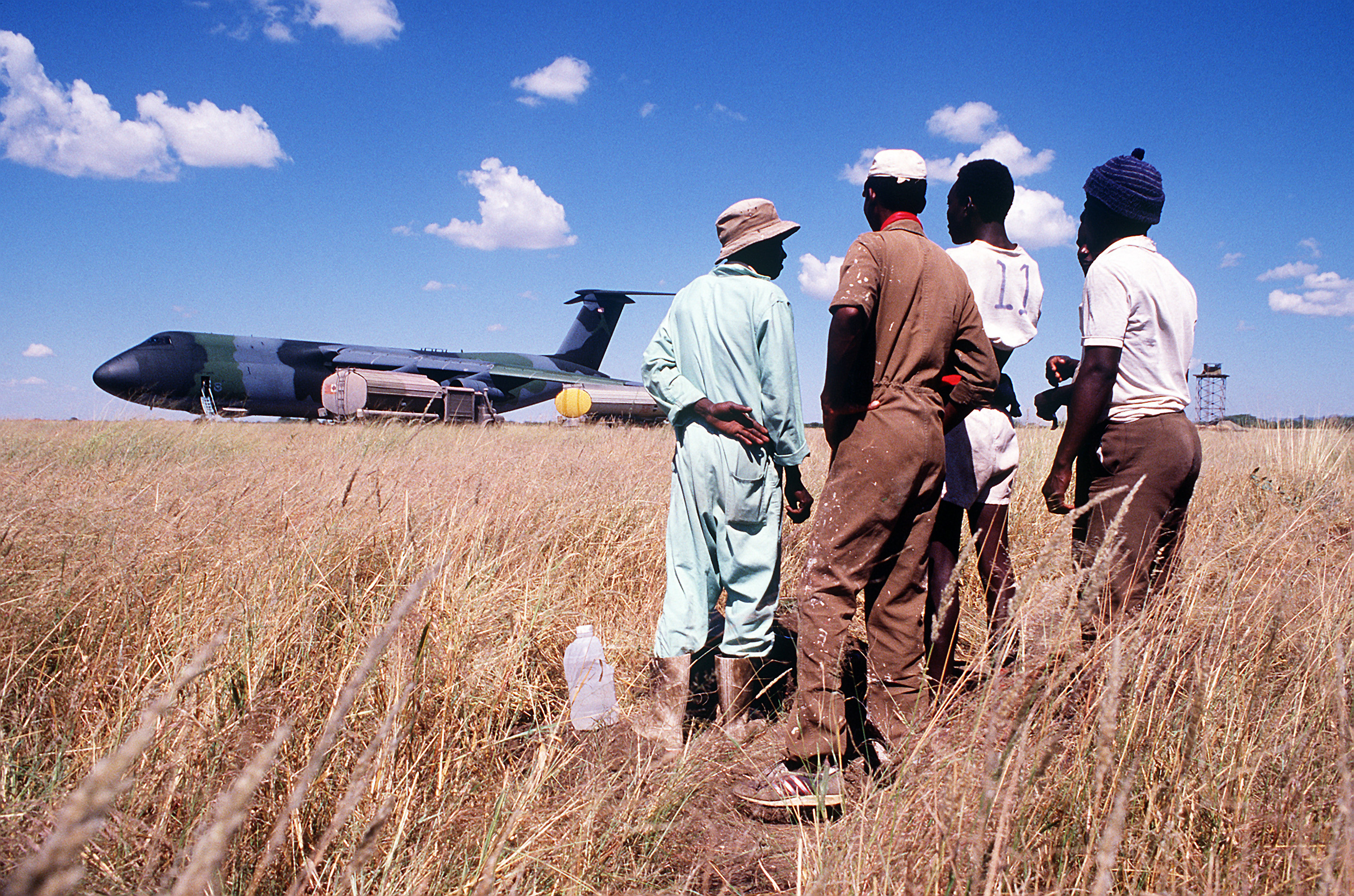
Namibian workers watch operations following the landing of a Military Airlift Command C-5B Galaxy aircraft at Grootfontein Logistics Base.

== See also ==
- Transport in Namibia
- List of airports in Namibia
