= Tsumeb railway station =

Railway station in Tsumeb, Namibia

General information
- Location: Tsumeb, Northeastern Namibia; Namibia
- Coordinates: 19°13′47″S 17°42′08″E
- Elevation: 1,281 metres (4,203 ft)
- System: Namibian Railway station
- Operator: TransNamib
- Lines: Windhoek–Tsumeb; Northern Extension
- Platforms: 2
- Tracks: 5

Construction
- Structure type: At Ground Single-track
- Parking: Available
- Accessible: yes

Other information
- Status: Functional

History
- Electrified: No.
Location

Tsumeb railway station is a station located in the mining town of Tsumeb in northeastern Namibia.

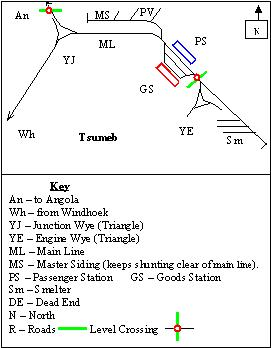

== Transport ==
It is served by a mostly freight railway. The extension of the railway towards the Angolan border in 2012 provided a bypass formed by a Triangle, and Tsumeb station now finds itself a terminal station east of the triangle.

A plant for the manufacture of concrete sleepers opened in Tsumeb in 2011.

=== Nearest airports ===
The nearest airports are Ondangwa Airport at Ondangwa, Tsumeb Airport at Tsumeb, and Otjiwarongo Airport at Otjiwarongo.

=== Adjacent station(s) ===
- North – Oshivelo, opened on the Northern Extension in 2005, Ondangwa, Oshikango
- West – Otavi, a 64km line completed in 1906, with upgrades in 1958 and 2019

== See also ==
- Railway stations in Namibia
- Transport in Namibia
- Oshikoto Region
- Etosha National Park
