= Rail transport in Namibia =

Railway network of Namibia

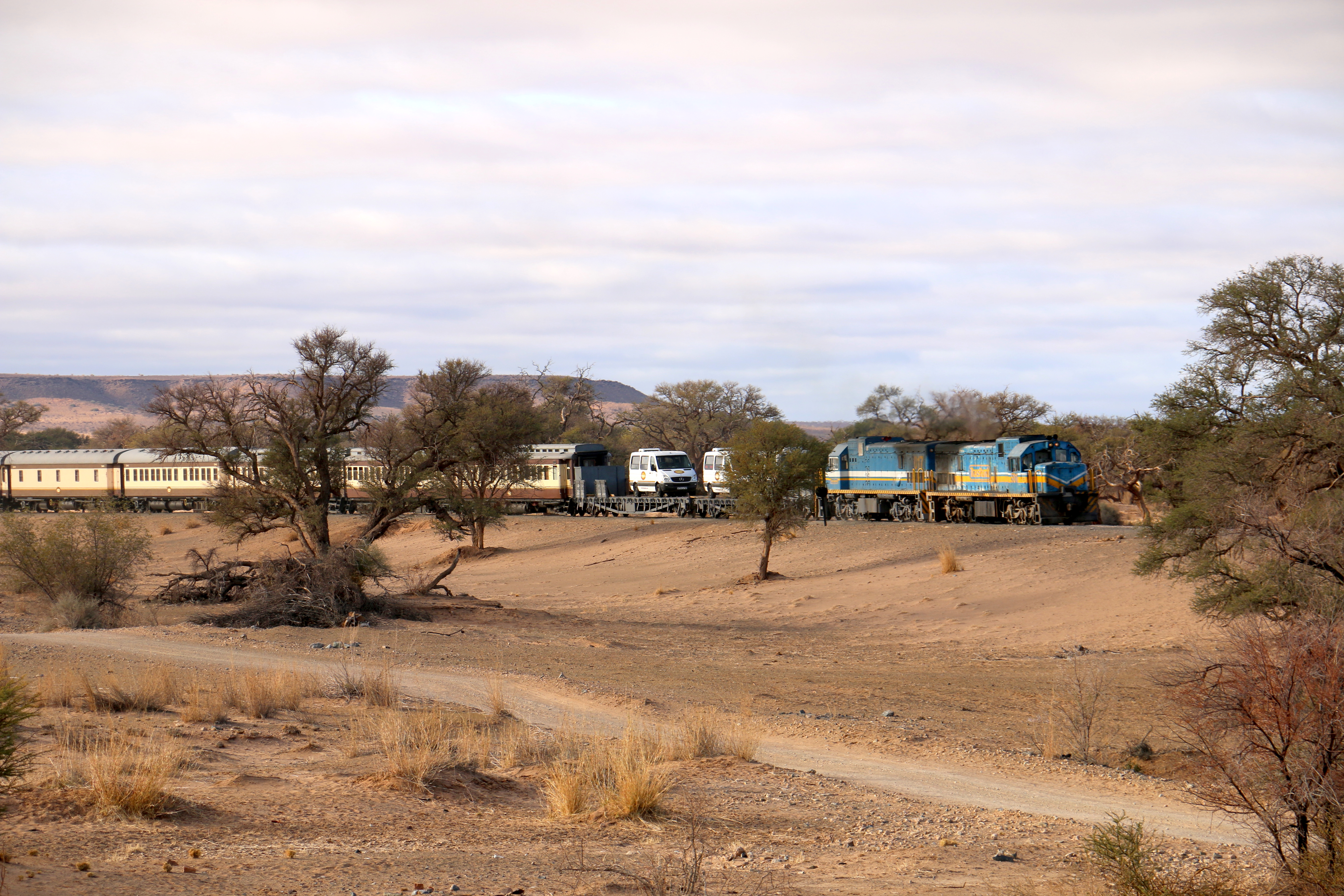
Luxury passenger train at Simplon (Between Sandverhaar and Goageb) in 2015

The rail service in Namibia is provided by TransNamib. The Namibian rail network consists of 2,687 km of tracks (2017).

Namibia has a history of more than 100 years of railway service. During the colonialisation by the German Empire between 1894 and 1915, a number of railways were built, of which some are still in service today.

== History ==
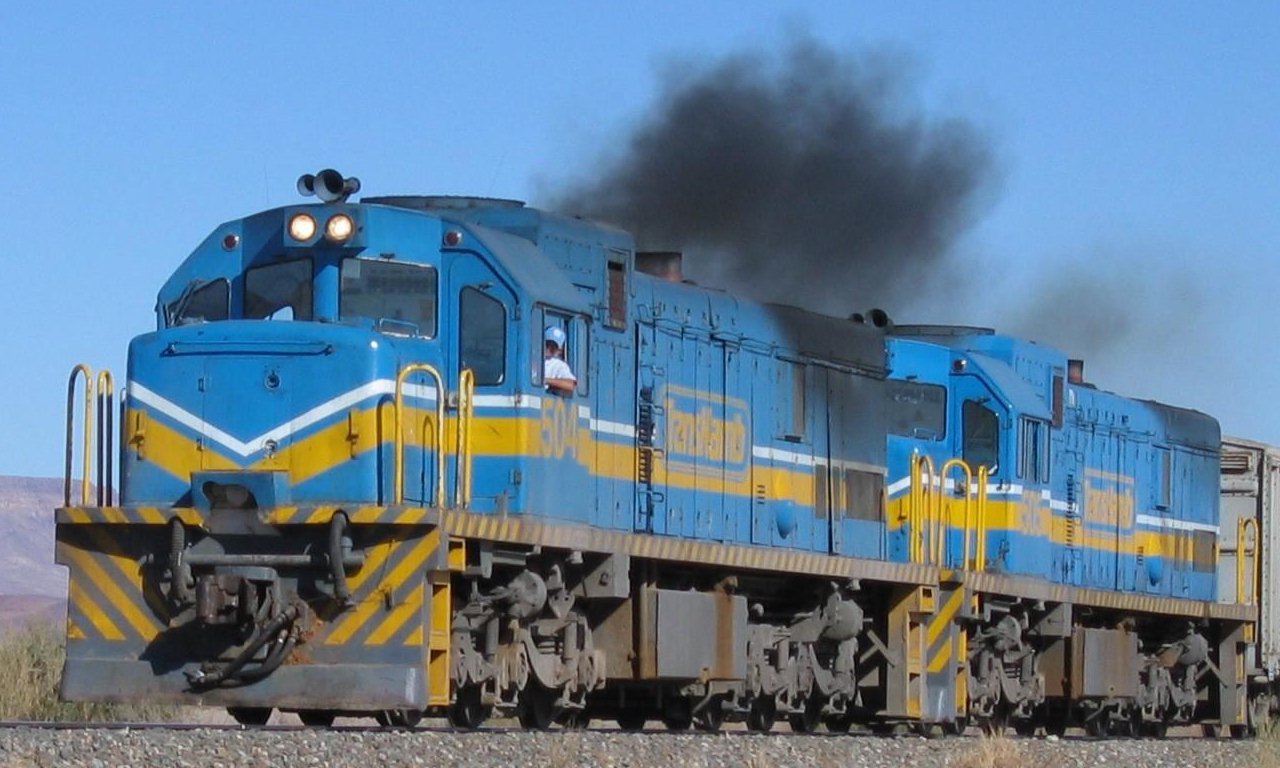
A TransNamib locomotives SAR Class 33-400 in Keetmanshoop.

=== Early development ===
The building of German South West Africa's railways began with a small mining rail line at Cape Cross in 1895. The first major railway project was started in 1897 when the German Colonial Authority built the "Staatsbahn" (state railway) from Swakopmund to Windhoek. By 1902 the line was completed. Parallel to this government initiative the Otavi Mining and Railway Company (O.M.E.G.) was established which built a line from Swakopmund to Tsumeb via Otavi between 1903 and 1906, and a branch from Otavi to Grootfontein in 1907/08.

In 1914 the following railway lines existed:

- The Cape Cross line, 762 mm (2 ft 6 in) gauge; 21 km (13 mi) long, built by George Gale, General Foreman in the Harbour Department at Durban using 10 kg per metre {18 lb per yard) rails
- The German State Railways, 1,067 mm (3 ft 6 in) gauge; 1,400 km (870 mi) long
- The German State Railways, 610 mm (2 ft) gauge; 190 km (120 mi) long
- The Otavi Railway, 762 mm (2 ft 6 in) gauge; 673 km (418 mi) long. A private railway built by the Otavi Mining and Railway Company between 1903 and 1906 to connect the mines at Tsumeb to the town of Swakopmund. In 1908 the line was extended by 91 kilometres (57 mi) to reach Grootfontein. The Otavibahn was the longest 600 mm (1 ft 11 5/8 in) gauge railway in the world at its time of construction.
- The Walvis Bay Railway, 762 mm (2 ft 6 in) gauge; about 18 km (11 mi) long. The line linked the port of Walvis Bay to Rooikop.
- 119 kilometres (74 mi) a 600 mm (1 ft 11 5/8 in) industrial line linking Kolmanskop with Bogenfels, completed 1913. This was the only rail link in Namibia ever electrified. The rail track does not exist anymore.
- Several other 610 mm (2 ft) gauge branch lines to mines at Khan, Kalkfeld and Outjo

The German colonial railway was taken over by the Railways of South Africa after World War I, and linked into the network of South Africa.

After the independence of Namibia, TransNamib took control of the national rail network that operates on 3 ft 6 in (1,067 mm).

=== African Rail Conference ===
Plans to integrate the railways of Africa to facilitate trade were discussed at the Africa Rail conference in Johannesburg, South Africa in August 2002. The move forms part of the New Partnership for Africa's Development (NEPAD), a programme aimed at economic renaissance.

The railways were built by former colonial powers, but were not built to advance African interests. Plans were put into place to link the three parallel east-west lines in Angola and to connect the Angolan network to that of Namibia and hence to South Africa.

The strategic positioning of Maputo rail and port infrastructure indicated that the network should be promoted as the primary corridor serving Zimbabwe, Zambia, Democratic Republic of Congo, Eswatini, and South Africa's Mpumalanga province.

South Africa's transport minister, Abdulah Omar, said Africa needed to integrate its railway systems to form an internationally-competitive network. Experts said this could involve leasing locomotives and wagons, becoming involved as concessionaires and consultants, and participating in joint ventures.

== Current Railway Lines ==
Namibia's national rail network operates on 3 ft 6 in (1,067 mm).

=== Windhoek-Kranzberg ===
The railway line from Windhoek to Kranzberg is 210 kilometres (130 mi) long and was completed in 1902.

- Windhoek - capital - junction
- Okahandja
- Karibib - proposed cement works
- Kranzberg - junction Tsumeb v Windhoek.

=== Kranzberg-Walvis Bay ===
The railway line from Kranzberg to Walvis Bay is 201 kilometres (125 mi) long. The section between Kranzberg and Swakopmund was completed in 1902. In 1914 an extension to Walvis Bay was commissioned; the rails were laid close to the shore of the Atlantic Ocean. In 1980 this extension was replaced by an alternative route behind the dunes that allowed for higher axle load.

- Kranzberg - junction Tsumeb v Windhoek.
- Usakos
- Arandis - crossing loop
- Swakopmund
- Walvis Bay - port
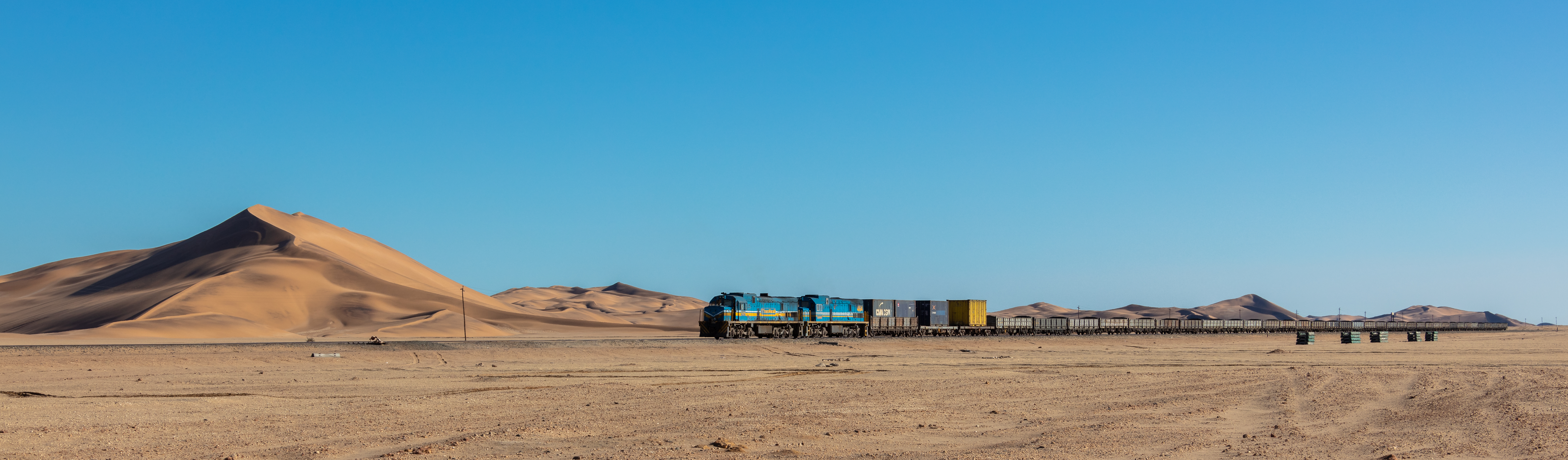
Train on the Swakopmund-Walvis Bay route

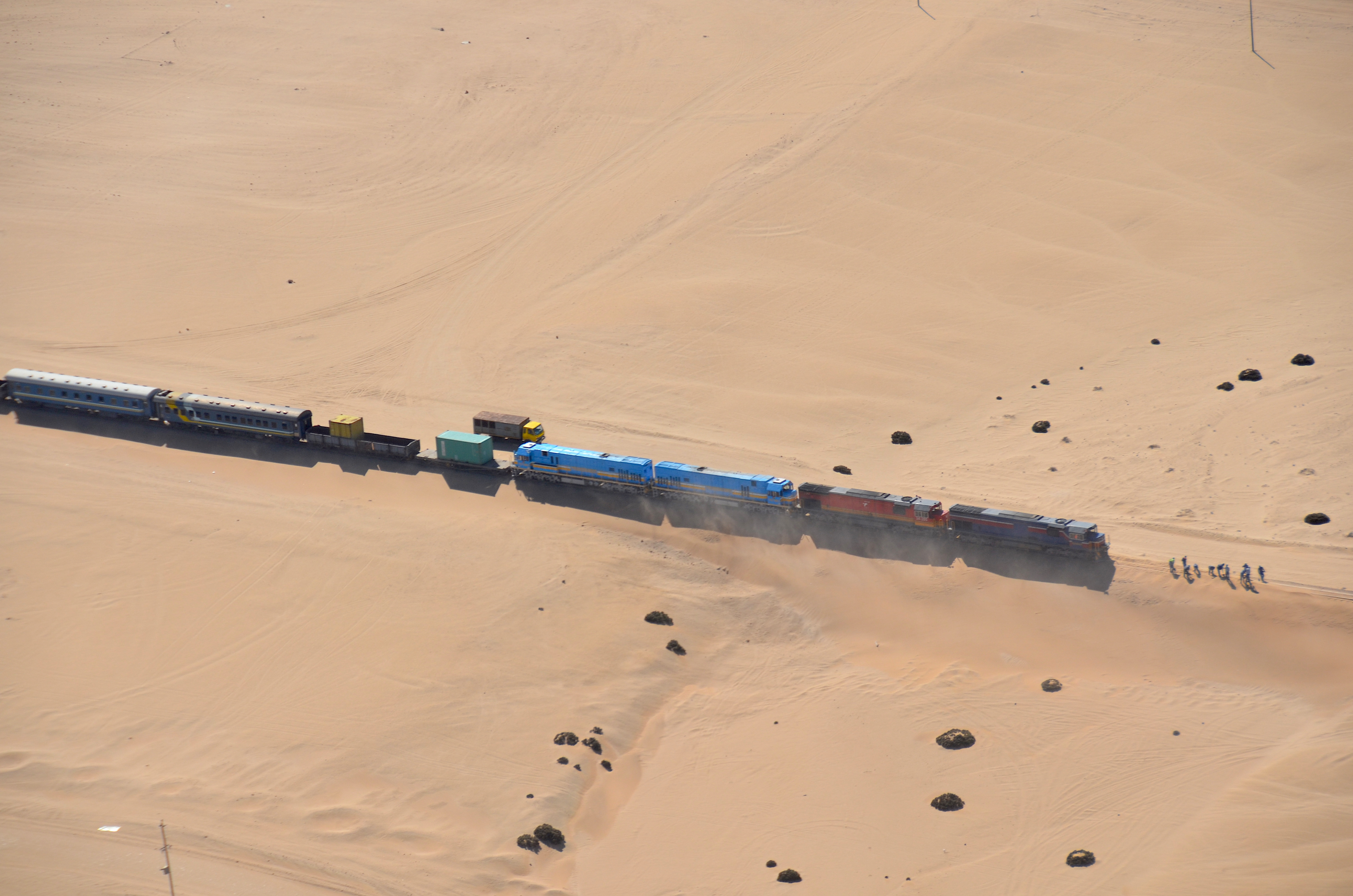
Track from Swakopmund to Walvis Bay covered by sand
22°47′17″S 014°35′20″E

=== Kranzberg-Otavi ===
The railway line from Kranzberg to Otavi is 328 kilometres (204 mi) long and was completed in 1906.

- Kranzberg - junction Tsumeb v Windhoek.
- Omaruru
- Kalkfeld - short siding
- Otjiwarongo - junction for Outjo
- Otavi

=== Otavi-Grootfontein ===
The railway line from Otavi to Grootfontein is 91 kilometres (57 mi) long and was completed in 1908.

- Otavi - junction for Grootfontein
- Grootfontein - branch terminus.

=== Keetmanshoop-Lüderitz ===
The railway line from Keetmanshoop to Lüderitz is 366 kilometres (227 mi) long. The connection between Lüderitz and Aus was completed in 1906, and the extension to Seeheim and Keetmanshoop was completed in 1908.

- Keetmanshoop
- Seeheim
- Goageb
- Aus
- Grasplatz
- Lüderitz - port

The service between Aus and Lüderitz was decommissioned in 1997 due to poor track condition. There is no regular passenger service between Seeheim and Aus. The line to Lüderitz was rehabilitated in the 2010s and was scheduled for reopening in 2017. Test trains ran to Lüderitz in 2014 and Lüderitz Harbour in 2018. It has been put into commercial use, mainly transporting manganese ore. According to the Karas Region Chancellor Jan Scholtz, Passenger service to Lüderitz will commence once it is determined that there is sufficient demand for it, but for the time being it is not being considered.

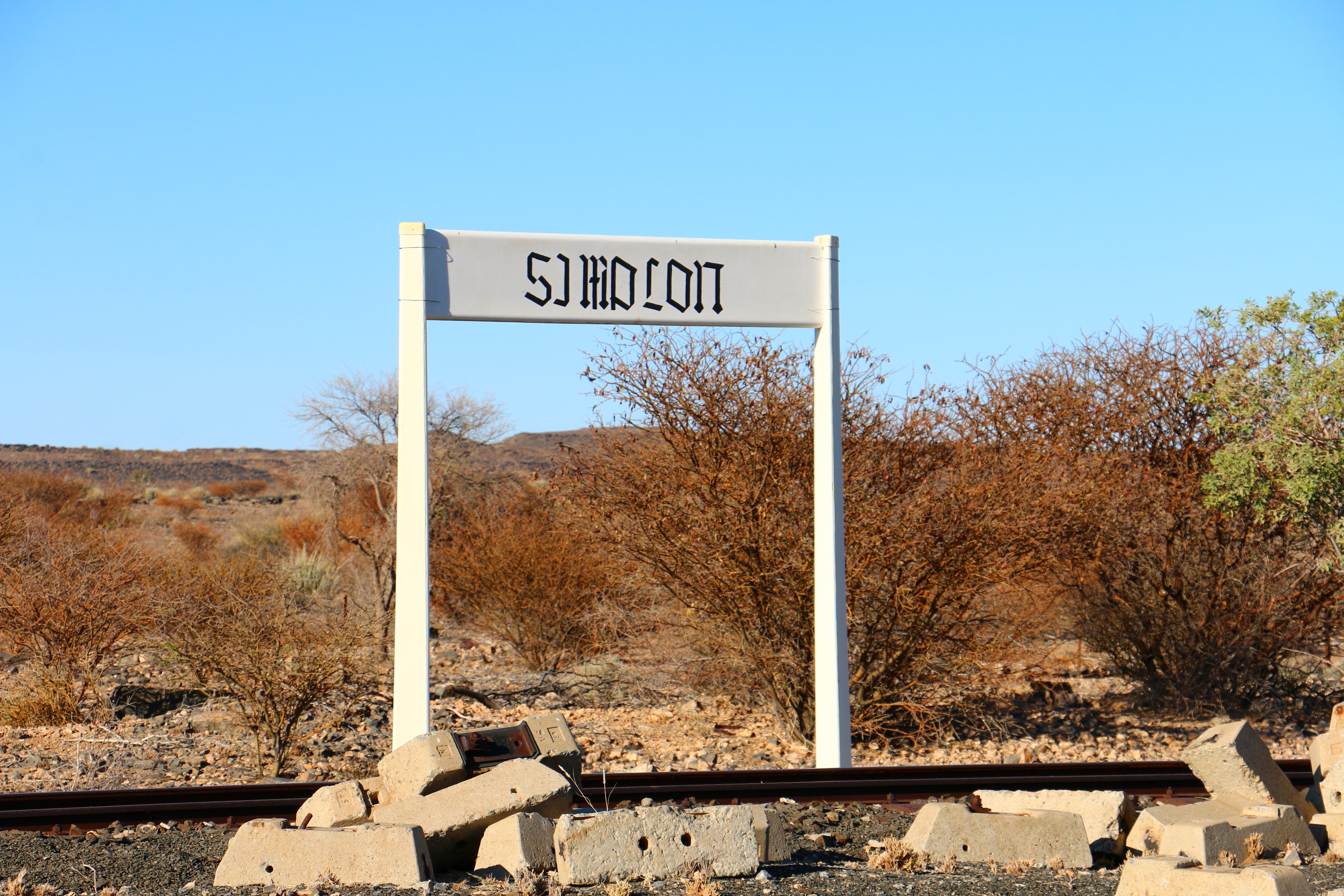
The remains of Simplon railway station, between Sandverhaar and Goageb

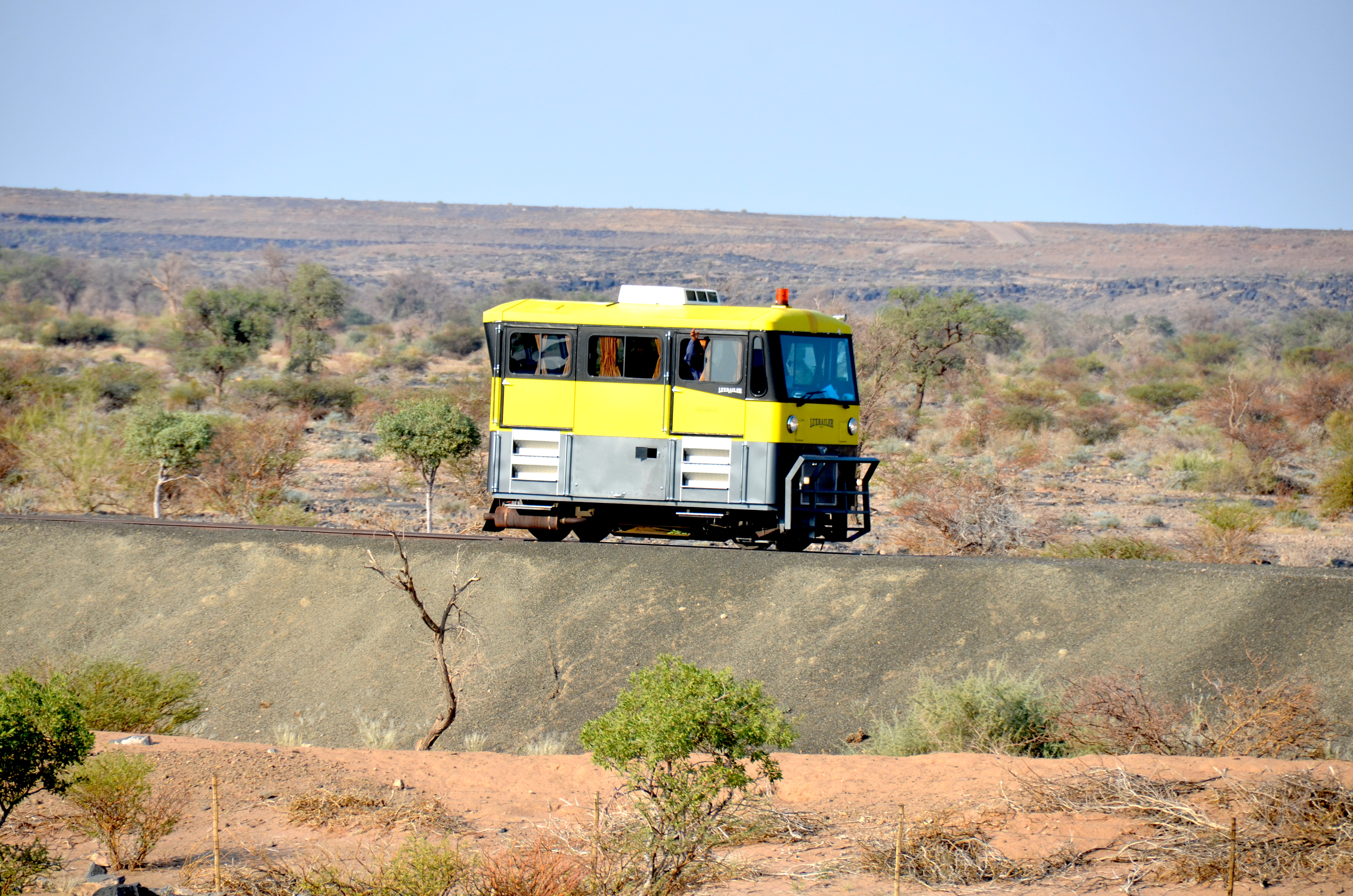
A Luxrailer inspection car passing Simplon station on its way from Seeheim to Aus (25 April 2017)

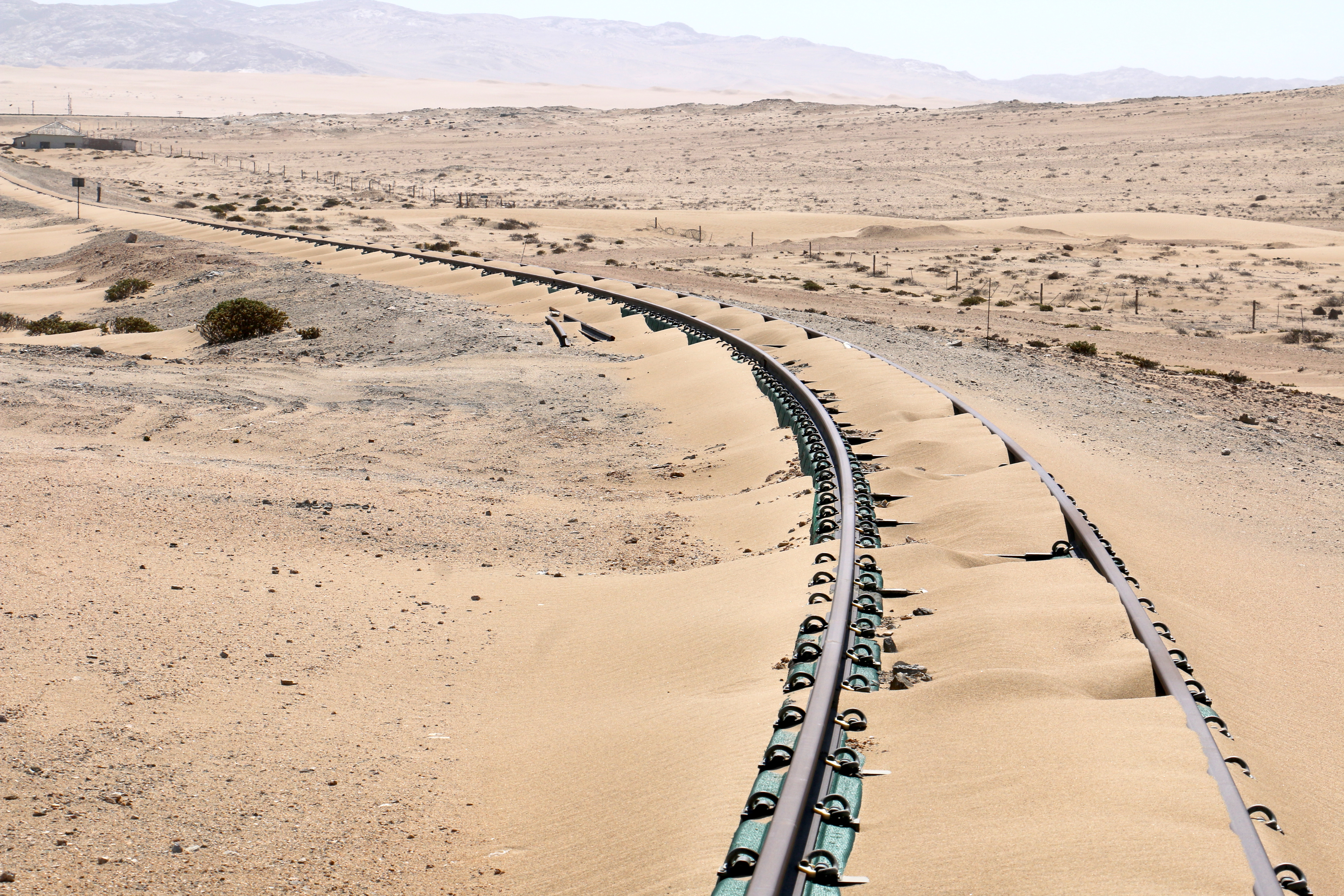
New track near Kolmanskop (October 2015)

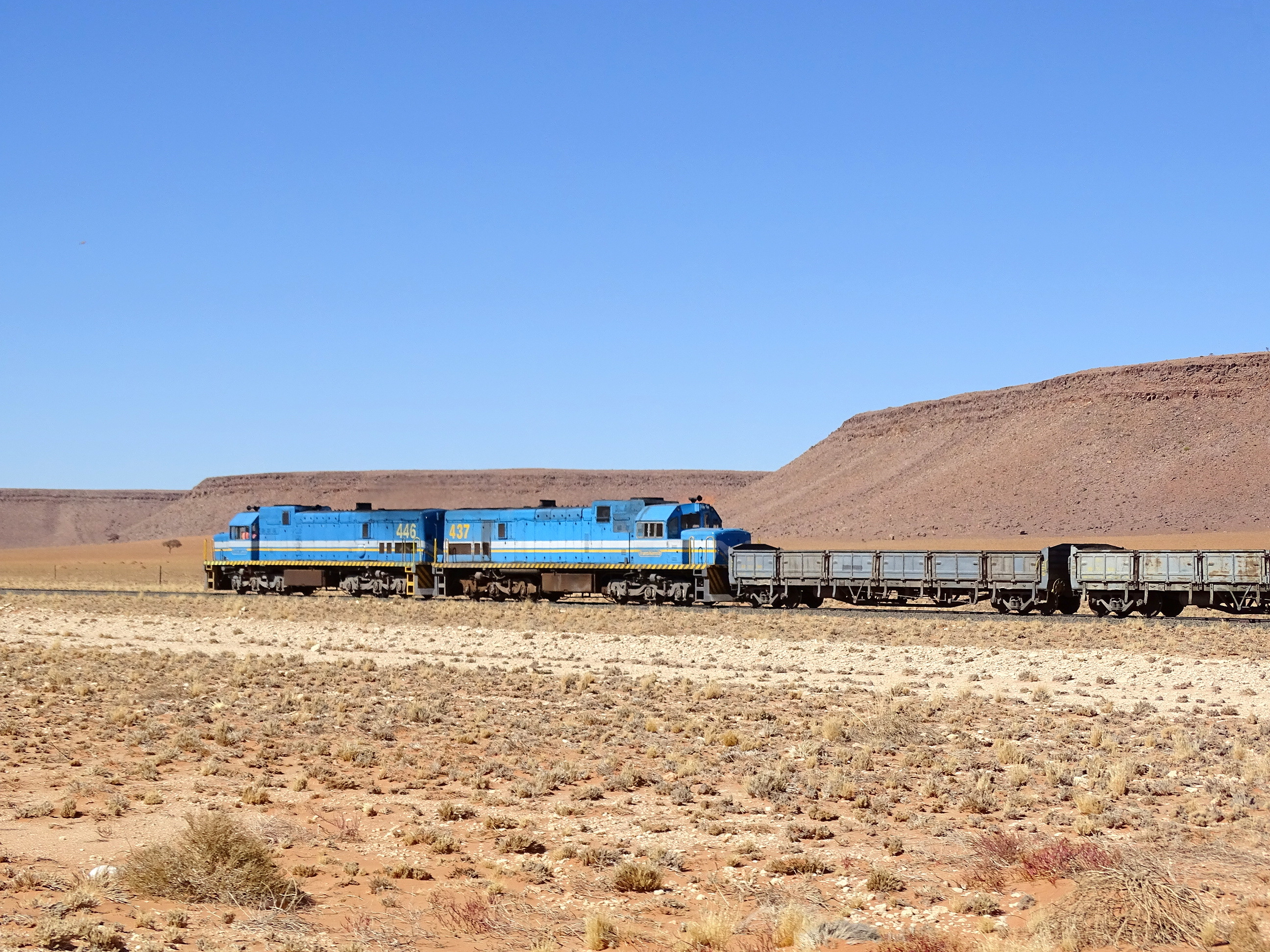
Train near Kolmanskop in 2019

=== Nakop-Windhoek ===
The railway line from Nakop to Windhoek is 869 kilometres (540 mi) long. The section between Karasburg and Keetmanshoop was completed in 1909. In 1912 the 500 kilometres (310 mi) connection between Karasburg and Windhoek was completed, and the extension to Upington (South Africa) was built in 1915.

- (South Africa) Upington
- (Namibia) (South Africa) Nakop border
- Karasburg
- Seeheim
- Keetmanshoop
- Tses
- Rehoboth
- Windhoek - capital - junction

=== Otjiwarongo-Outjo ===
The railway line from Otjiwarongo to Outjo is 69 kilometres (43 mi) long. The first 26 kilometres (16 mi) were completed under the German colonial administration in 1914/1915; the railway line was named Amboland Railway in reference to the territory of the Ovambo people. The link to Outjo was completed in 1921 under South African rule.

- Otjiwarongo - junction for Outjo
- Outjo - railhead

=== Windhoek-Gobabis ===
The railway line from Windhoek to Gobabis is 228 kilometres (142 mi) long and was completed in 1930.

- Windhoek - capital - junction
- Neudamm
- Omitara
- Gobabis - branch railhead
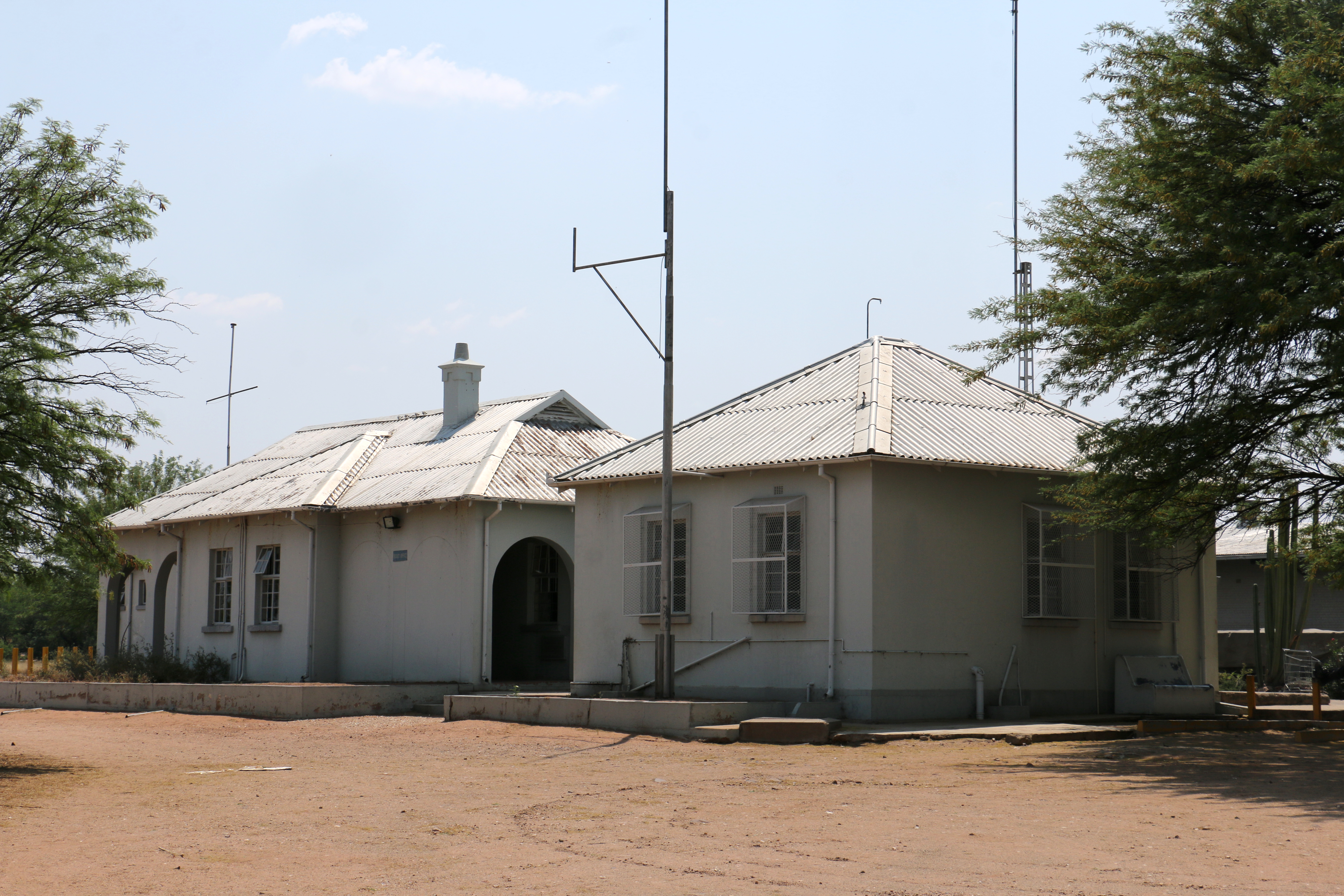
Gobabis railway station

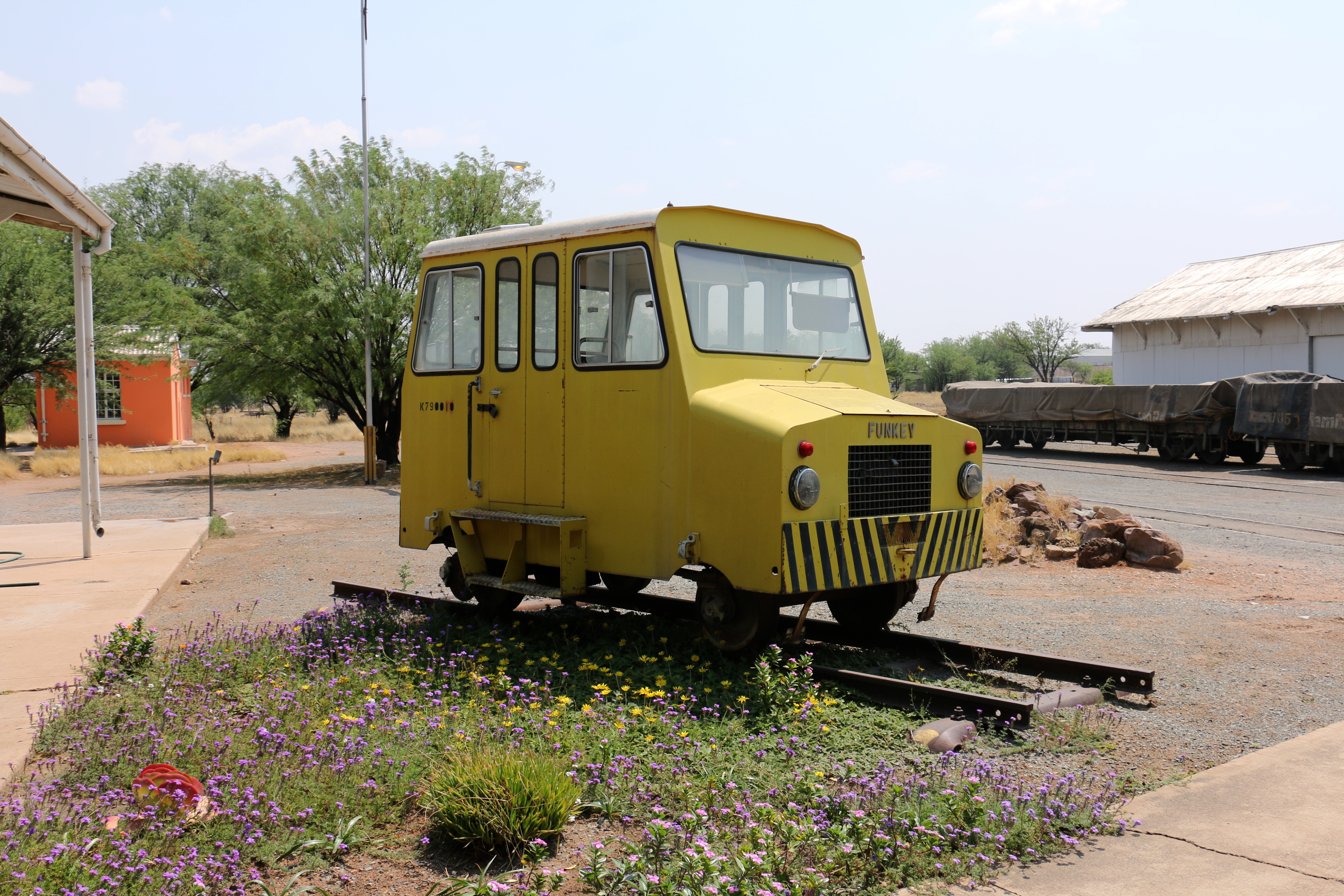
Gobabis railway station

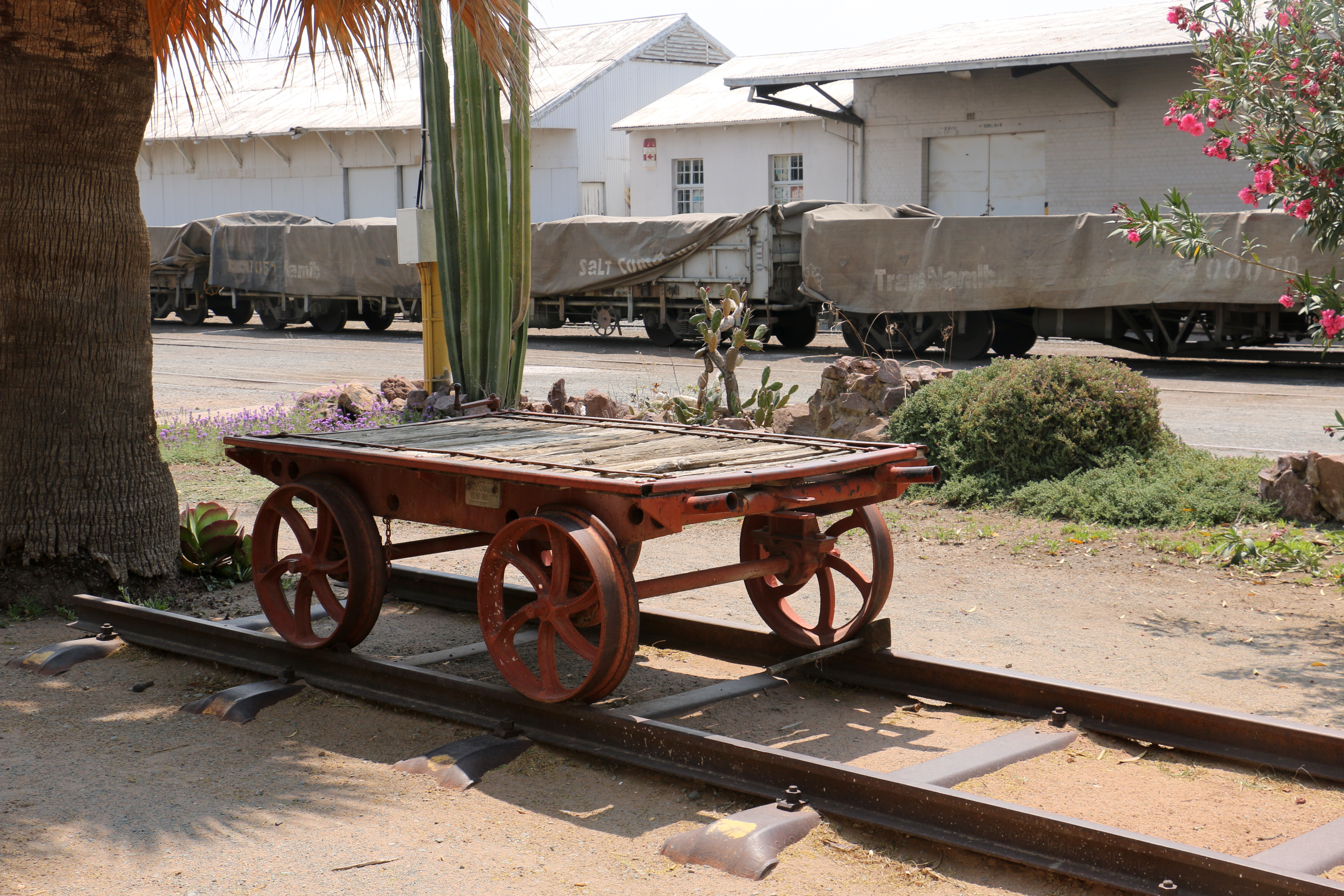
Gobabis railway station

=== Otavi-Oshikango ===
In 2005, an 89 km section of new Northern Railway from Tsumeb to Oshivelo was opened by President Sam Nujoma, as part of the "Northern Extension" of the railway link from Kranzberg to Otavi. Construction on the project's second phase, a 59 km stretch from Ondangwa to Oshikango on the Angolan border at a cost of about N$329m, was scheduled to be completed by December 2007. Ondangwa Station opened in 2006 for freight.

In phase 3, a 58 km branch from Ondangwa to Oshakati was constructed at an estimated cost of N$220m, for completion in December 2008. For the future a connection from Oshikango to a point near Cassinga is planned on Angola's southern railway system.

The Ondangwa-Oshikango line was officially opened by President Hifikepunye Pohamba in July 2012. In order to keep system operational and safe, provincial governor Usko Nghaamwa implored local residents to stop stealing railroad ties and sections of the wire fence.

- Otavi - junction for Grootfontein
- Tsumeb
- Ondangwa - junction
- Oniipa road bridge.
- Onjdiva
- Namacunde
  - Oshakati
- (Namibia) (Angola) Oshikango - border post - current railhead

== Proposed Railway Lines ==
=== Trans-Kalahari Coal Line ===
- Gobabis - current railhead
- (Namibia) (Botswana) Buitepos - border post
- (Botswana) Mamuno
- (Botswana) Mmamabula - coal deposits
- Lobatse, Botswana - current railhead

=== Zambia-Namibia link ===
- Zambia - Grootfontein

Along the Caprivi Strip, which was acquired by Germany in 1890 (the colonial power of Namibia at the time) for the very reason of building a railway to the Zambia border and the Zambezi River. However the river is not navigable from the Indian Ocean to this place, which caused the railway not to be built.

== See also ==
- Transport in Namibia
- Railway stations in Namibia
