= Otavi railway station =

Railway station in Otavi, Namibia

General information
- Location: Otavi, North central Namibia; Namibia
- Coordinates: 19.6411°S 17.3394°E
- System: Namibian Railway station
- Operator: TransNamib
- Line: Oshikango Walvis Bay line
- Platforms: 2

Construction
- Structure type: At Ground Single-track
- Parking: Available
- Accessible: yes

Other information
- Status: Functional

History
- Electrified: No.
Location

Otavi railway station is located in the mining town of Otavi in Namibia's central Otjozondjupa Region. It is served by a mostly freight railway and limited number of passenger service. The extension of the railway towards the east to Grootfontein is exclusively for freight service.

== Nearest airport ==
The nearest airports are Ondangwa Airport at Ondangwa, Tsumeb Airport at Tsumeb, and Otjiwarongo Airport at Otjiwarongo.

- List of airports in Namibia

== Adjacent station(s) ==
- (north) - Tsumeb railway station, Oshikango railway station
- (south) - Otjiwarongo railway station
- (east) - Grootfontein railway station

== See also ==
- Railway stations in Namibia
- Transport in Namibia
- Otjozondjupa Region
- Otavi
- Etosha National Park
- List of countries by rail transport network size
