= Omaruru railway station =

Railway station in Namibia

Coordinates: 21°25′8″S 15°56′57″E

Omaruru railway station is a railway station serving the town of Omaruru in Namibia. It is part of the TransNamib railway network.

Omaruru is situated on the Kranzberg—Otavi line, completed in 1906 during Imperial Germany's colonial rule of German South West Africa.

Omaruru connects via Otavi to the north of Namibia via the so-called "Northern Extension", built between 2002 and 2012 to connect Tsumeb with Oshikango. All southern and central rail connections lead via the railway junction in Kranzberg.

== See also ==
- Rail transport in Namibia
