= Windhoek railway station =

Railway station in Windhoek, Namibia

Windhoek
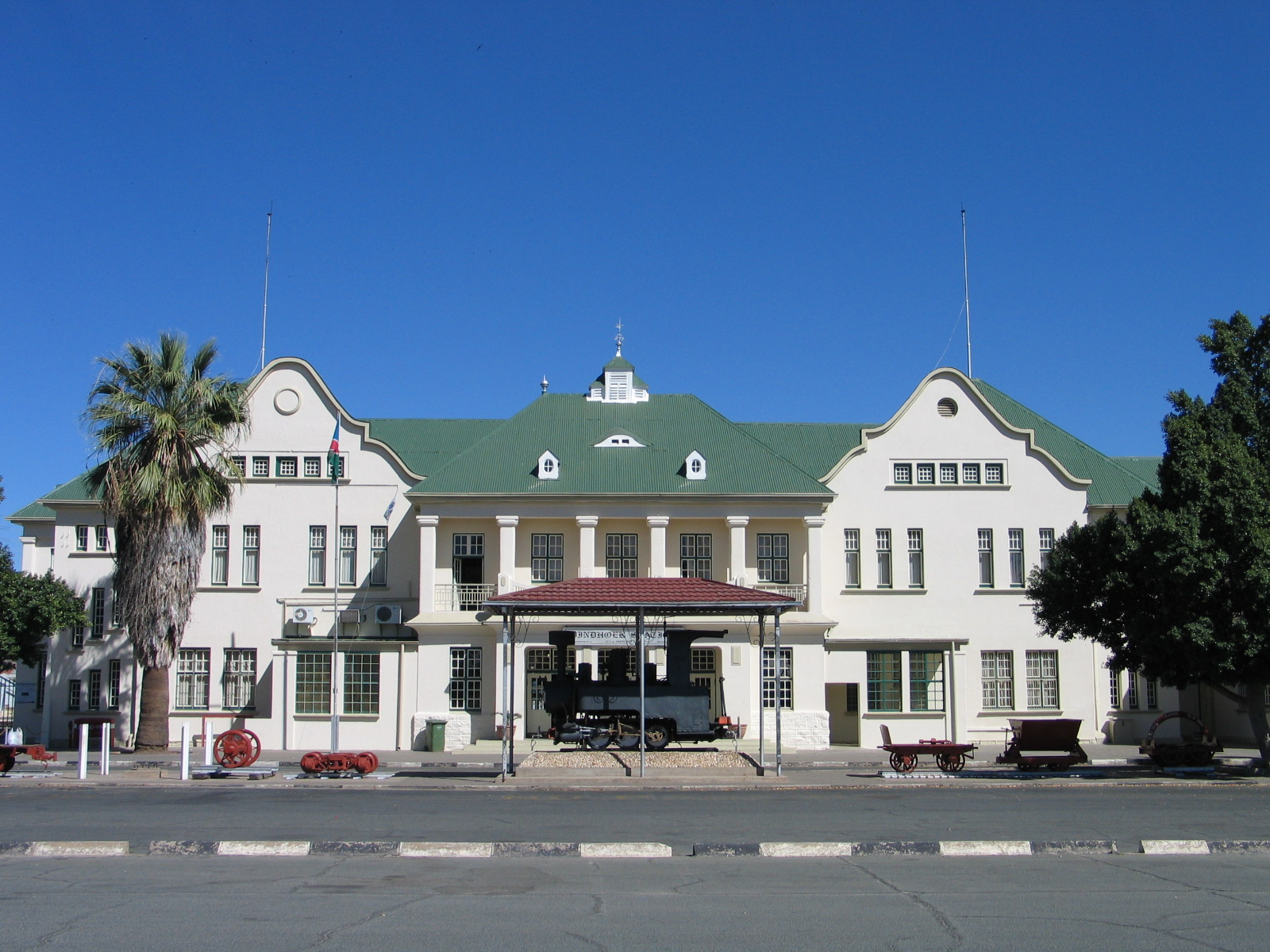
- Front view of the station building

General information
- Location: Bahnhof Street, Windhoek, Namibia
- Coordinates: 22.5594°S 17.081°E
- System: TransNamib
- Lines: Windhoek-Gobabis; Windhoek-Nakop; Windhoek-Kranzberg
- Platforms: 2 (at-grade)
- Tracks: 3

Construction
- Structure type: At-grade
- Platform levels: 1
- Parking: yes
- Accessible: yes

History
- Opened: 1912
Location

Windhoek railway station (German: Bahnhof Windhuk) is a railway station serving the city of Windhoek, the capital of Namibia. It is an important station in the Namibian rail network, and it is run by TransNamib.

== History ==
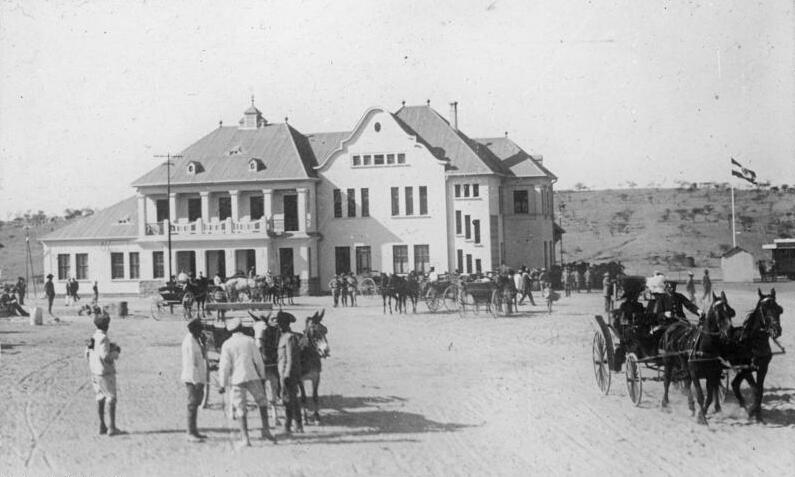
Railway station in 1914

The first railway line to reach Windhoek was the one from Swakopmund, built between 1897 and 1902 during Imperial Germany's colonial rule of German South West Africa. In 1914 this line was extended to Walvis Bay. The southern line from Lüderitz (built 1906) was connected via Keetmanshoop to Windhoek in 1912. In 1930 the eastern line to Gobabis was built.

== Building ==
The station was built in a Cape Dutch-style and is located on Bahnhof street. An additional northern wing was constructed by South African Railways in 1929 to match the existing style of the building.

The station also houses the small Trans-Namib Railroad Museum which outlines Namibian transport history, particularly that of the railway. Opened on July 1, 1993, the exhibition consists of a wide range of railway equipment, maps and related items which date back to German colonial times. Another part of the exhibition is dedicated to Namibian Airways history and Namibian Maritime history. You can also see the crockery and cutlery used in the dining cars of South African Railways in Namibia along with telecommunication and electrical equipment.

Across from the entrance stands the German locomotive Poor Ole Joe, one half of a South West African Zwillinge No 154A, the sole surviving specimen of this type of steam locomotive. It was originally shipped to Swakopmund in 1899 and reassembled for the run to Windhoek.

== Services ==
Windhoek is connected to a number of towns in the north of Namibia via the railway junction in Kranzberg, which lies on the Windhoek-Swakopmund-Walvis Bay route.

== Gallery ==
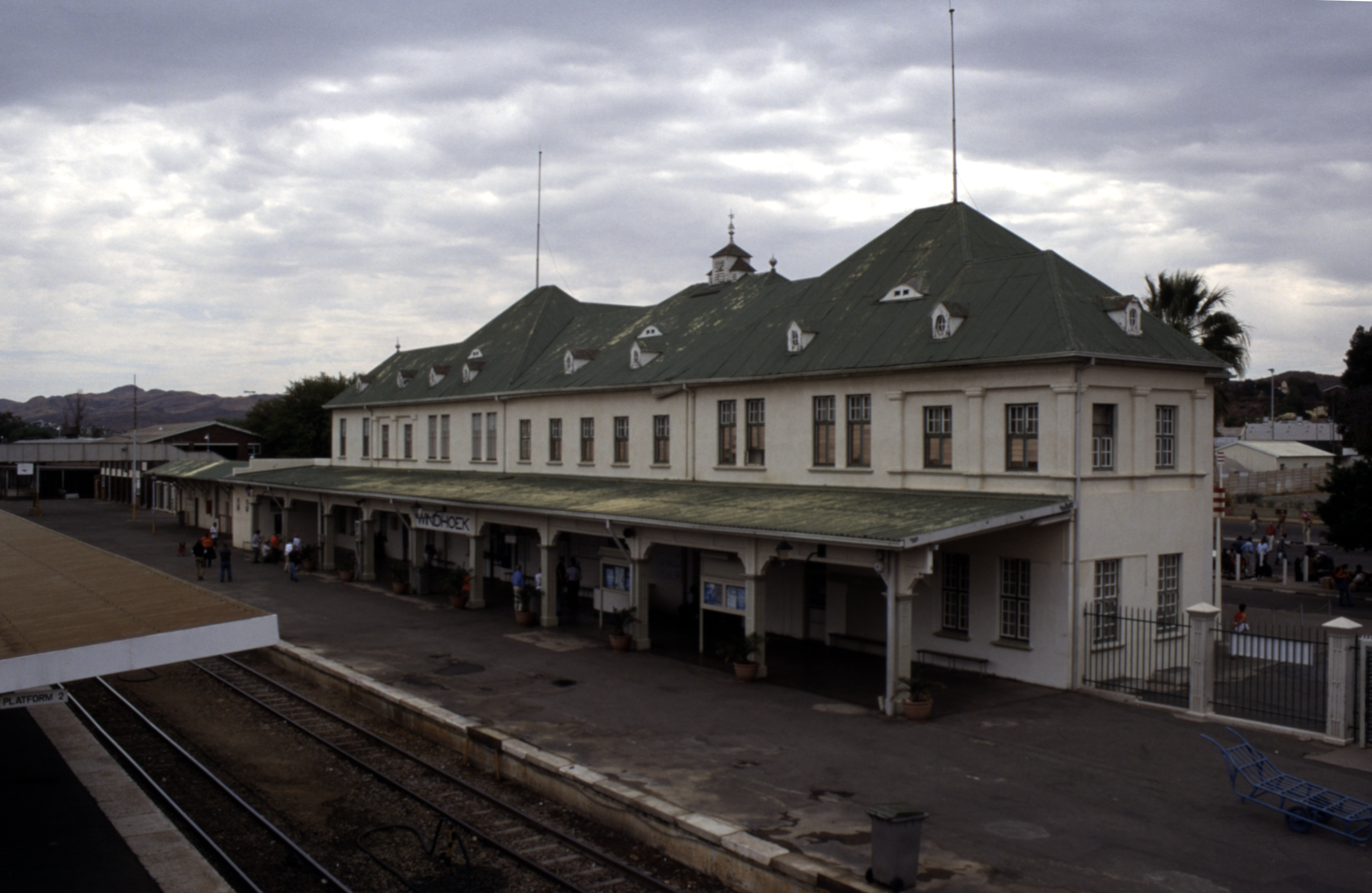
The station building and platforms

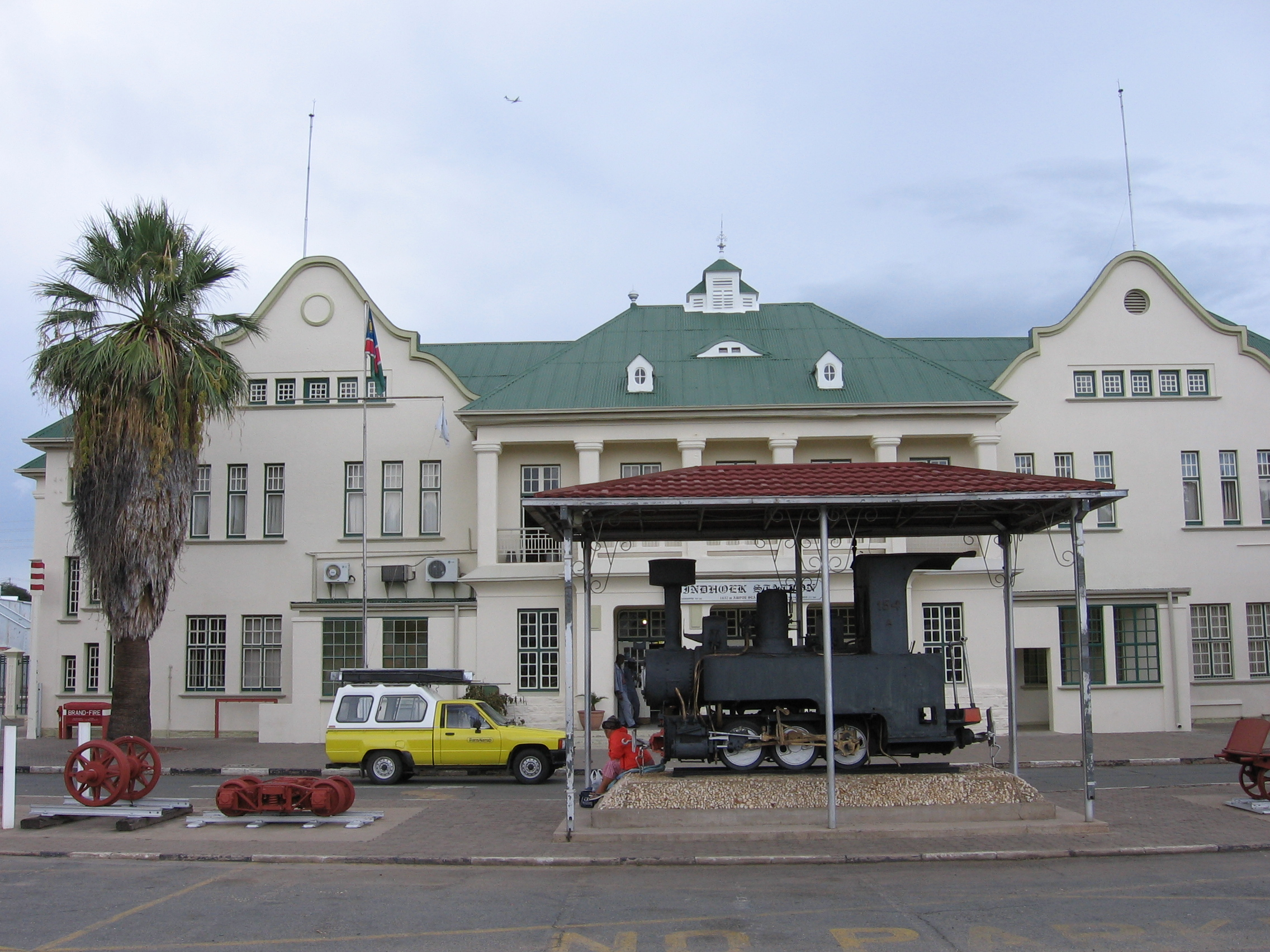
A small steam locomotive, one half of a Zwillinge No 154A., in front of Windhoek Station

== See also ==
- Rail transport in Namibia
