= Keetmanshoop railway station =

Railway station in Namibia

Coordinates: 26°35′00″S 18°08′00″E

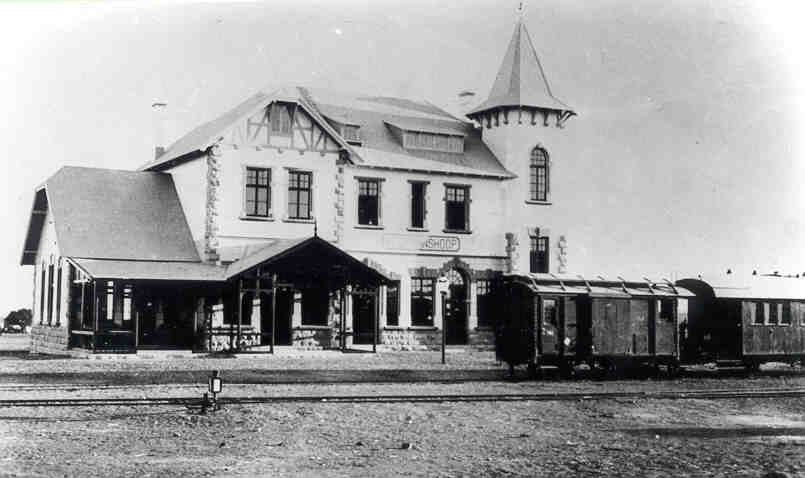
Keetmanshoop railway station in 1914

Keetmanshoop railway station is a railway station serving the town of Keetmanshoop in Namibia. It was erected in 1908 when the territory was colonised by Imperial Germany. It is part of the TransNamib Railway, and is located along the Windhoek to Upington line that was inaugurated in 1915 and connects Namibia with South Africa. Keetmanshoop also has a junction to Seeheim and Aus, completed in 1908.

== Gallery ==
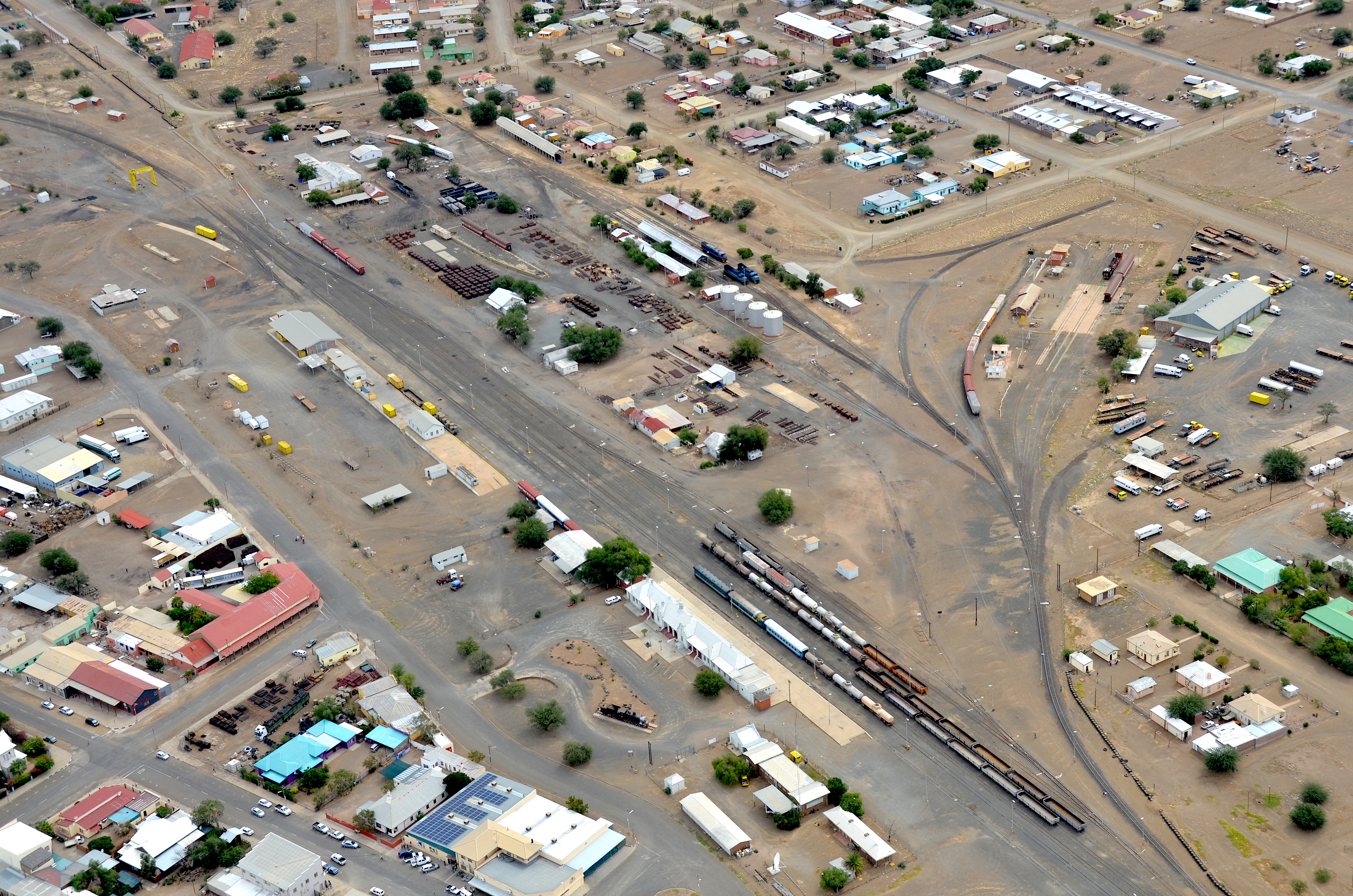
Aerial view of Keetmanshoop railway station 2017

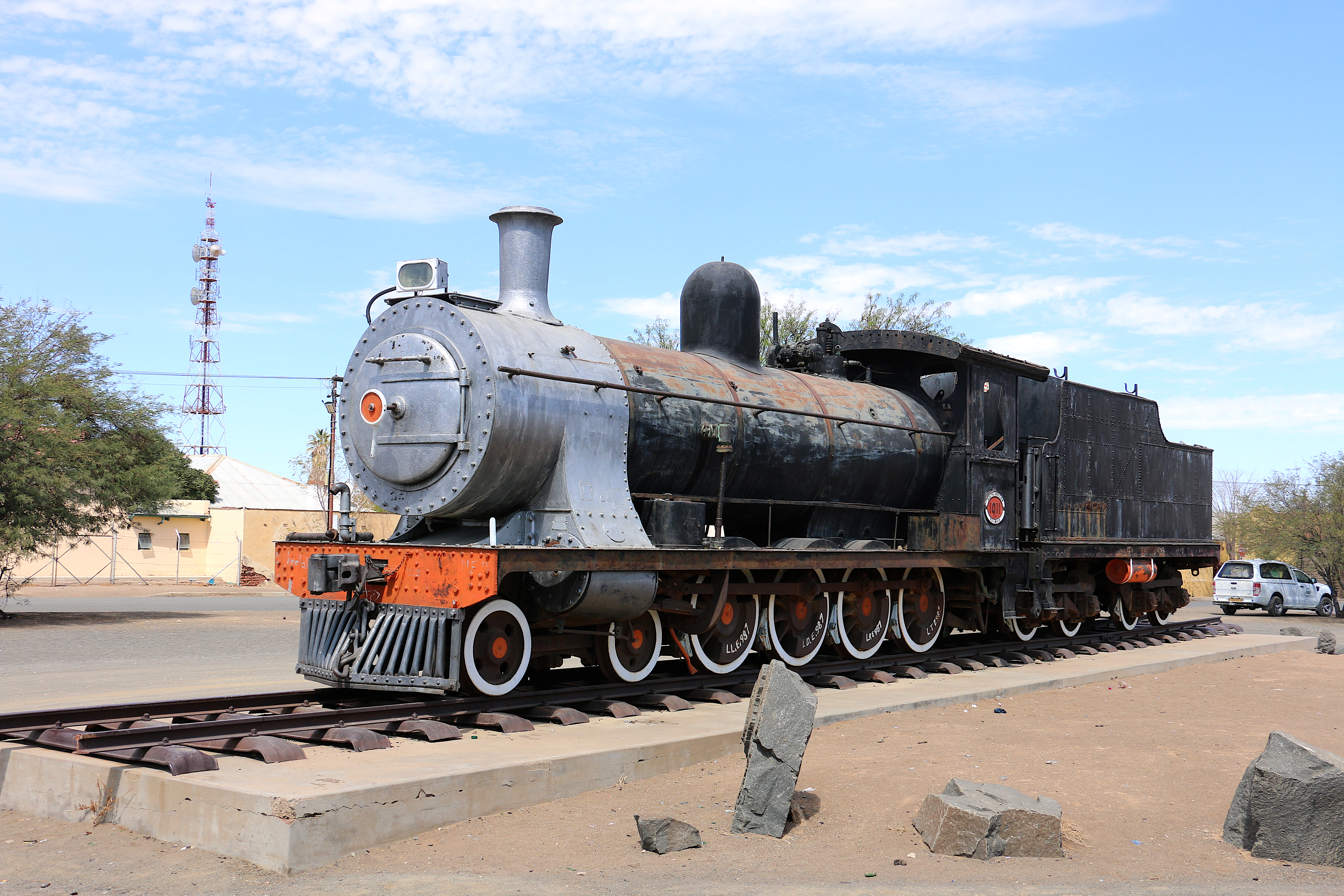
Steam locomotive of South African Railways in front of the station building

== See also ==
- Railway stations in Namibia
