= Lüderitz railway station =

Railway station in Namibia

Coordinates: 26°38′50.58″S 15°9′14.37″E

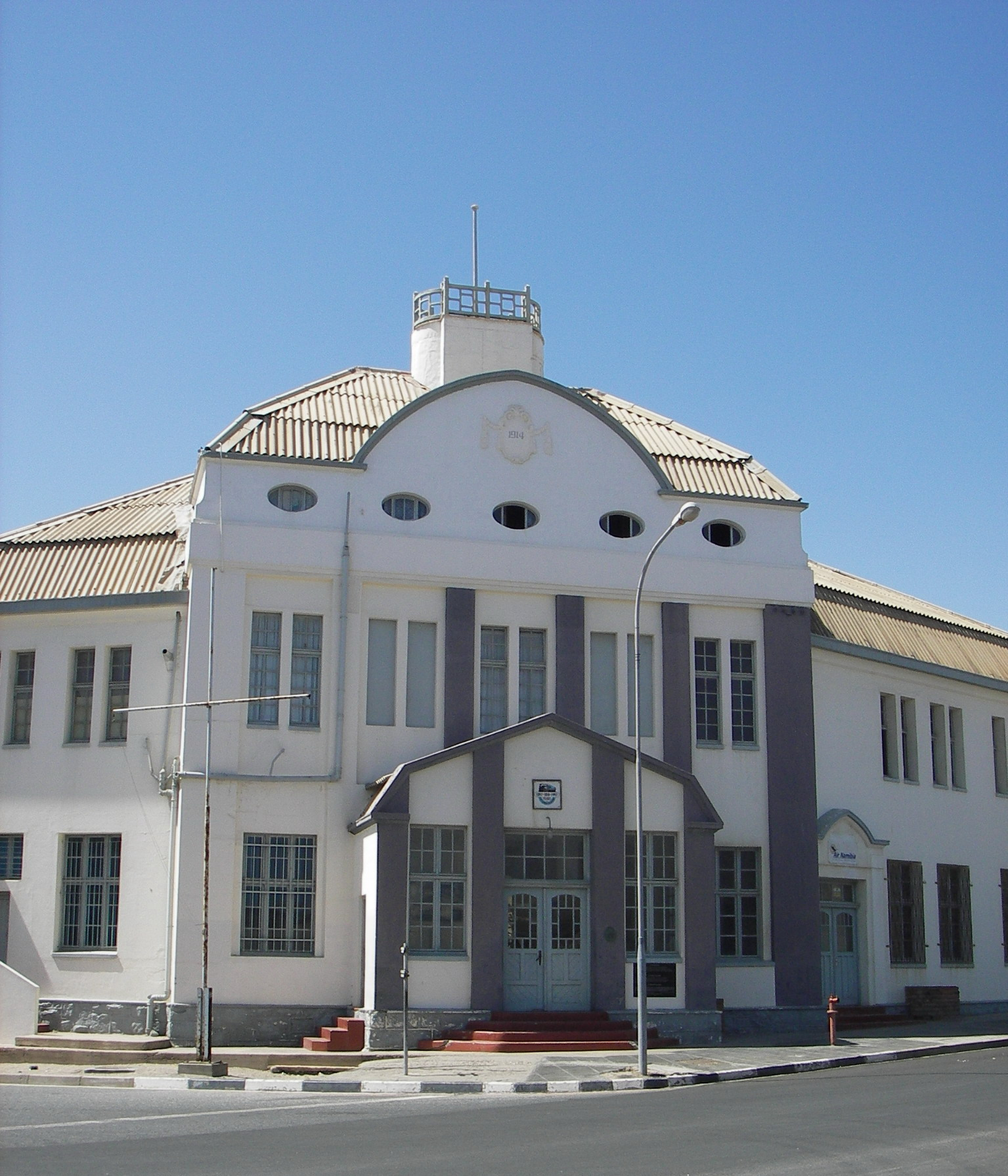
Lüderitz railway station

Lüderitz railway station (German: Bahnhof Lüderitz) is a railway station serving the town of Lüderitz in Namibia. It was erected in 1904.

== Overview ==
It is part of the TransNamib Railway, and is the terminal of the currently decommissioned line to Aus which was completed in 1906. The extension to Seeheim was completed in 1908, and the connection to Windhoek and the central-eastern railway network in 1912.

== See also ==
- Rail transport in Namibia
