= South West African Zwillinge =

Type of steam locomotive

GSWA Zwillinge 0-6-0T South West African Zwillinge 0-6-0T
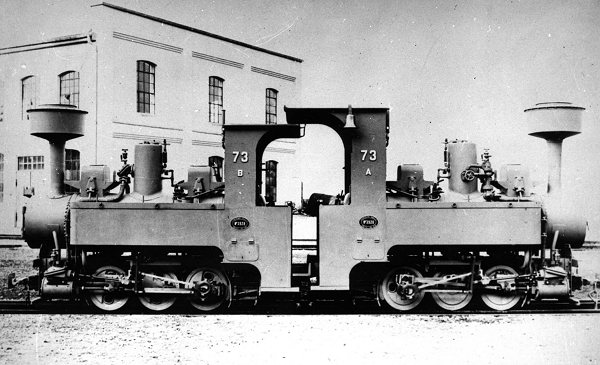
- Krauss picture of Zwillinge no. 73 B & A, c. 1899
Type and origin
- Power type: Steam
- Builder: Krauss & Company; Henschel and Son; L. Schwartzkopff; Egestorf; Maschinenbau Anstalt Humboldt; Arnold Jung
- Model: Zwillinge
- Build date: 1899–1905
- Total produced: 182 pairs
Specifications
- Configuration
  - Whyte: 0-6-0T
  - UIC: Cn2t
- Driver: 3rd coupled axle
- Gauge: 600 mm (1 ft 11 5/8 in) narrow
- Coupled dia.: 580 mm (22.8 in)
- Wheelbase: 1,300 mm (4 ft 3.2 in)
  - Coupled: 1,300 mm (4 ft 3.2 in)
- Length
  - Over couplers: 8,200 mm (26 ft 10.8 in) pair
  - Over beams: 3,510 mm (11 ft 6.2 in) unit 7,200 mm (23 ft 7.5 in) pair
- Width: 1,600 mm (5 ft 3.0 in)
- Height: 2,700 mm (8 ft 10.3 in)
- Frame type: Plate
- Adhesive weight: 16,500 lb (7,500 kg)
- Loco weight: 8,500 kg (18,700 lb)
- Fuel type: Coal
- Fuel capacity: 250 kg (550 lb)
- Water cap.: 830 L (180 imp gal)
- Firebox
  - Type: Round-top
  - Grate area: 0.3 m^{2} (3.2 sq ft)
- Boiler pressure: 220 psi (1,517 kPa)
- Heating surface
  - Tubes: 14.29 m^{2} (153.8 sq ft)
- Cylinders: Two
- Cylinder size: 180 mm (7.1 in) bore 240 mm (9.4 in) stroke
- Valve gear: Stephenson
- Valve type: Murdoch's D slide
- Couplers: Buffers-and-chain
Performance figures
- Maximum speed: 20 km/h (12 mph)
- Power output: 60 hp (45 kW)
- Tractive effort: 12.2 kN (2,700 lbf) @ 60%
Career
- Operators: Swakopmund-Windhuk Staatsbahn; South African Railways
- Number in class: 50+ pairs
- Nicknames: Zwillinge or Illinge
- Delivered: 1898–1905
- First run: 1898
- 1. Data for single engine unless indicated otherwise.; 2. The total production of 182 pairs includes those built for use in other parts of the world.

The South West African Zwillinge 0-6-0T of 1898 was a narrow gauge steam locomotive from the German South West Africa era.

Between 1898 and 1905, more than fifty pairs of Zwillinge twin 0-6-0T steam locomotives were delivered to the Swakopmund-Windhuk Staatsbahn (Swakopmund-Windhoek State Railway) in German South West Africa. By 1922, only two of these locomotives remained to be taken onto the roster of the South African Railways.

== Swakopmund-Windhuk Staatsbahn ==
The first troops of the German Feldbahn-Baukommando (field railway construction commando) arrived in Swakopmund in German South West Africa (GSWA) on 11 September 1897. They were tasked to build a narrow gauge railway across the Namib Desert from Swakopmund to Windhoek, via Jakkalswater and Karibib. The 382-kilometre-long (237-mile) Swakopmund-Windhuk Staatsbahn, later named the Northern State Railway or Nordbahn, was officially opened to traffic nearly five years later, on 1 July 1902.

The railway was initially intended for temporary military use and was to be operated using animal power, such as Argentine mules or Cape donkeys, but steam traction was soon adopted. The track was laid on steel sleepers with 19-pound-per-yard (9-kilogram-per-metre) rail and featured very sharp curves and steep gradients. Climbing out of the Khan River gorge, the gradient was 1 in 19 (5¼%) with curves of 180-foot radius (55-metre).

In 1905, a 14-kilometre-long (9-mile) branch line was constructed from Karibib on the Nordbahn to Onguati near Usakos, where it connected with the new Otavi line from Swakopmund to Tsumeb. This created an alternative line from Windhoek to the Atlantic Ocean at times when the section through the Khan River gorge suffered from the occasional flooding. The Nordbahn section between Swakopmund and Karibib was later abandoned and, between 1911 and 1913, the 119-mile-long (192-kilometre) section between Karibib and Windhoek was regauged to Cape gauge.

== Manufacturers ==
Zwillinge locomotives, the first engines to enter service on the Nordbahn, were a class of small 600 millimetres (23.6 inches) narrow gauge paired 0-6-0T steam locomotives. They were built in Germany in the late nineteenth and early twentieth century for military railways in Germany and the German Empire. The first large consignment of Zwillinge locomotives arrived in Swakopmund between 1898 and 1899. Eventually, by 1905, more than fifty new or used pairs had been delivered to the Swakopmund-Windhuk Staatsbahn.

They were built by six manufacturers, Krauss and Company, Henschel and Son, L. Schwartzkopff, Egestorf, Machinenbau Anstalt and Arnold Jung. These so-called Feldbahn locomotives, built for the military, were also used in other German colonies and several came to GSWA second-hand.

The final batch of four pairs of Zwillinge for the Swakopmund-Windhuk Staatsbahn were built by Krauss in 1903 with works numbers 4875 to 4878 and engine numbers 179 to 182 A and B.

== Characteristics ==
As indicated by their name Zwillinge (twins), they were actually two separate locomotives which were designed to be semi-permanently coupled back-to-back at the cabs, allowing a single footplate crew to fire and control both engines. Each pair of locomotives shared a common manufacturer’s works number and engine number, with the individual units designated as A and B. The A units had higher cabin roofs than the B units, allowing the roofs to overlap when coupled, providing better protection for the crew. They were designed so that they could also be used separately and each had a complete set of controls. When they were run in single mode, they were commonly referred to as Illinge.

The principle of using two tank locomotives which are semi-permanently coupled at their cab ends was patented in 1855 by the English locomotive builders Robert Stephenson and Company.

The Zwillinge could negotiate curves of 66-foot radius (20-metre) and could haul loads of 32 long tons (32.5 tonnes) up a 1 in 25 (4%) gradient. They had balloon-type spark arresters in their chimneys and were coal-fired, the coal being imported from Germany. The steam regulator was arranged outside the high steam dome and, on some, two sandboxes were arranged on top of the boiler, fore and aft of the dome, while others had two small cylindrical sandboxes attached to the smokebox. They had flat Murdoch's D slide valves which were actuated by Stephenson valve gear, arranged outside the 5/8-inch thick (16-millimetre) plate frames.

By the outbreak of the First World War, a total of 182 Zwillinge pairs had been produced for employment in several German territories. Production of new Zwillinge was terminated a few years after the adoption of the larger 0-8-0T Brigadelok as the new standard German military locomotive in 1901. At least twelve of these new Brigadeloks were also delivered to the Swakopmund-Windhuk Staatsbahn between 1901 and 1904, built by Krauss and numbered in the range from 101 to 112.

== Service ==
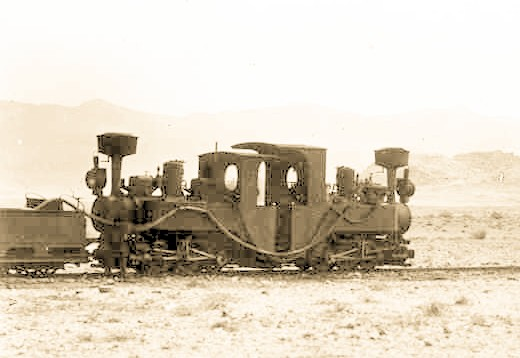
Zwillinge near Pforte in 1898

Shortly after the first Zwillinge locomotives were placed in service, it was found that the tank engine's fuel and water capacities were insufficient for the distances which had to be covered in the German colonies in Africa, especially in the harsh conditions presented by the Namib Desert which had to be crossed between Swakopmund and Windhoek. To solve this, a four-axle water tender was attached to the twin engines. It served the dual purpose of also providing seating for armed escorts. The bench atop the water tender as well as the water pipe between the locomotives and tender is visible in the picture alongside.

When the German government began to regauge the line between Windhoek and Swakopmund, most of the Zwillinge were withdrawn from GSWA. Most of them were sold to Japan and a few were purchased by the Otavi Railway for use as construction engines.

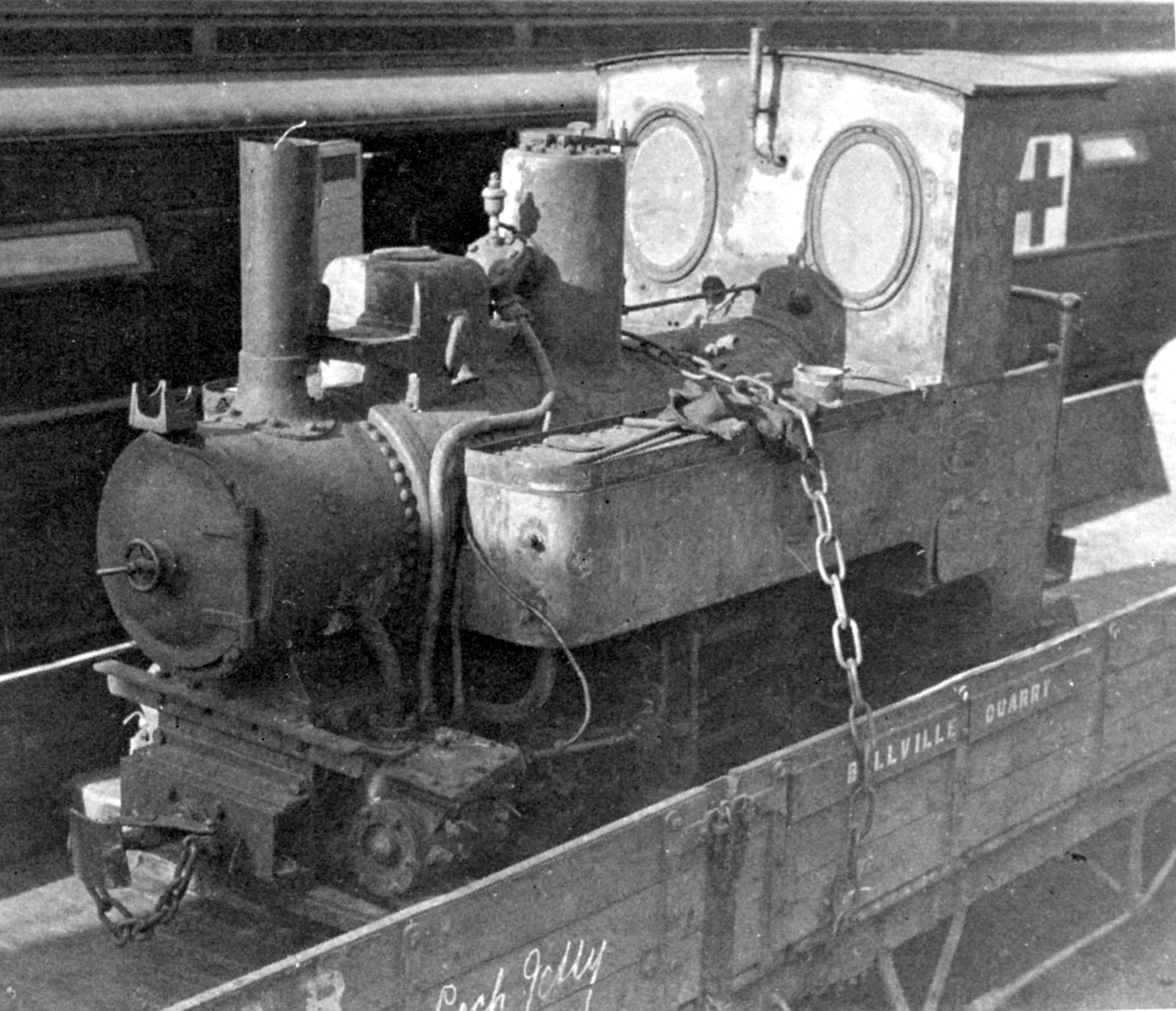
No. 169B arriving at Bellville Quarry

In 1922, the South African Railways (SAR) took control of all railway operations in South West Africa (SWA), but the SWA locomotives were never reclassified or renumbered and retained their former German identities until they were withdrawn from service. Illinge numbers 154A and 169B were the only known survivors of the Zwillinge fleet to be taken onto the SAR roster.

No. 154A was employed in Windhoek as a non-revenue departmental locomotive and was finally withdrawn from service in 1939, after logging a total mileage of about 371,000 miles (597,000 kilometres).

No. 169B, built in 1904 by Maschinenbau-Anstalt Humboldt, was shipped to Cape Town after the First World War and placed in non-revenue service at the Bellville quarry into the side of the Tygerberg.

== Preservation ==
The sole surviving Zwillinge locomotive, no. 154A, is now plinthed under a shelter outside Windhoek Station. This particular locomotive was half of a pair which was built by Henschel in 1900, works no. 5376. The engine arrived in GSWA second-hand in 1904, being shown in the Henschel works lists as originally built new for the Deutsche Feldbahnen in 1900 as one half of seven locomotive pairs with engine numbers 148A&B to 154A&B and works numbers 5364 to 5377. It is not known where it was first placed in service.

It was originally plinthed at the Railway College at Esselen Park in Kaalfontein, near Kempton Park in Transvaal. During the late 1950s, it was returned to SWA and plinthed in its present location in front of the station building in Windhoek.

== Commemoration ==
A postage stamp depicting the Zwillinge was one of a set of four SWA commemorative stamps which was issued on 2 August 1985 to commemorate the narrow gauge locomotives which pioneered railways in the territory. The stamp design was by the noted stamp designer and artist Koos van Ellinckhuijzen.

The particular locomotives depicted were the second GSWA pair, numbered 2A and 2B. The name of the station on the name board on the stamp, written in Fraktur script, is Otjimukoka. In 1903, this station was renamed to Johann Albrechtshöhe in honour of Duke John Albert of Mecklenburg, and again changed later to the shortened Albrechts. A head-on outline of an Illinge was used by the SWA postal authorities as a commemorative cancellation for Swakopmund on the date of issue. The stamp, the postmark and another painting of the Zwillinge appeared on the first day cover which marked the release of the four stamps.

== Other locomotive types ==
Other locomotive types also served on the Nordbahn, but information about them is sketchy. Apart from the twelve Brigadeloks, the first of another type of small twin locomotives known as Pugs by the enginemen and probably employed on shunting duties, were delivered in 1901 from Machinenbau Anstalt of Breslau, with boilers supplied by Krauss and Company.

The Pug twins shared a water tank which was arranged between their engine frames and had chimneys with balloon-type spark arresters. The wheel arrangement of the individual engines is not known, but the boiler pressure was set at 176 pounds per square inch (1,213 kilopascals), the total heating surface of the boiler was 154 square feet (14.3 square metres), the firegrate area was 3.65 square feet (0.339 square metres) and the tractive effort at 50% of boiler pressure was 2,150 pounds-force (9.6 kilonewtons). The boiler pitch was 3 feet 7 5/16 inches (1,100 millimetres) and the engine weight in working order was 7 long tons 0 hundredweight 3 quarters (7,150 kilograms).

A second pair of such twins was delivered by Machinenbau Anstalt, also in 1901, but with larger boilers and without the balloon type spark arresters.

== Illustration ==
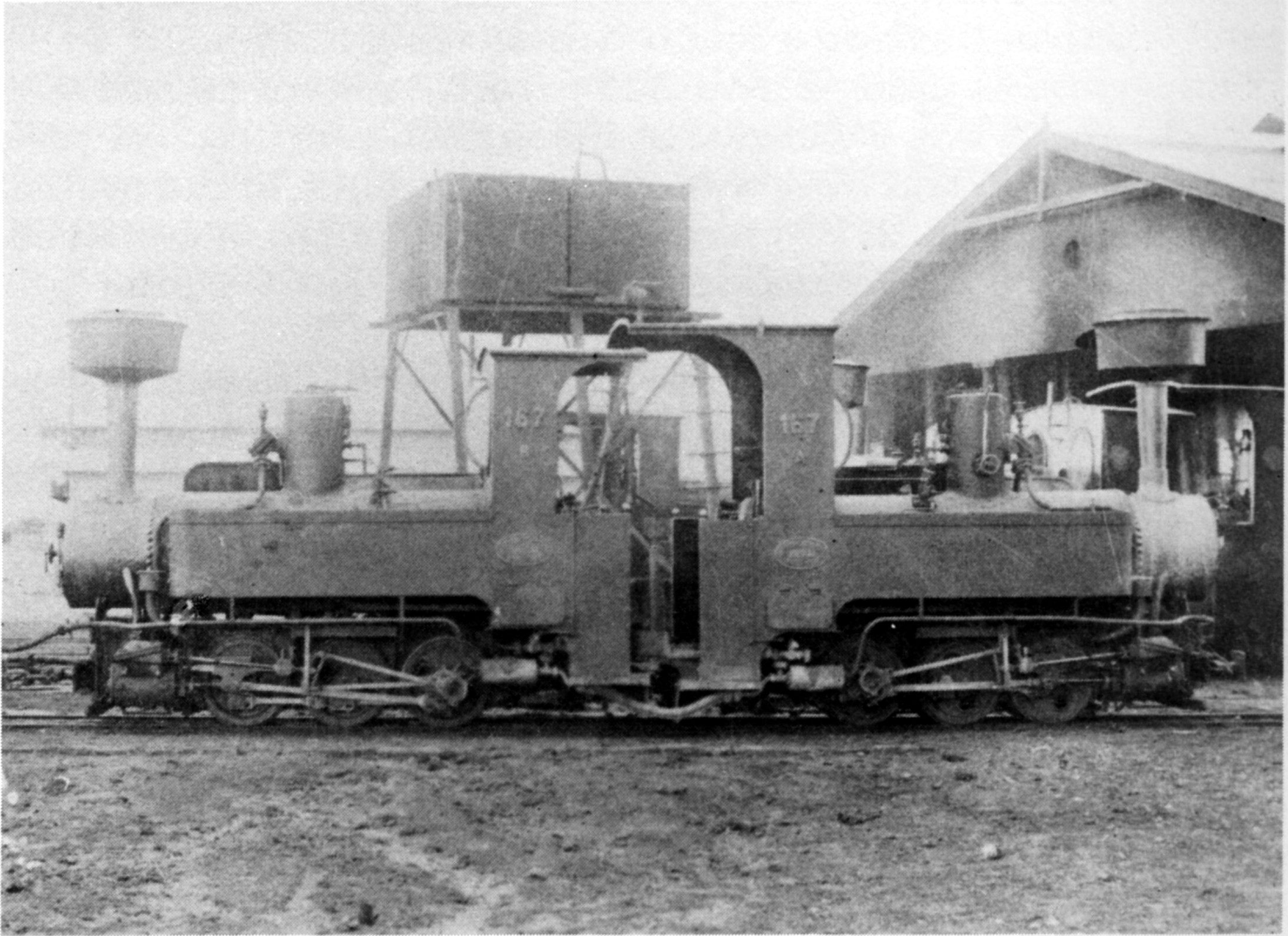
Zwillinge 0-6-0T no. 167 B & A, c. 1920

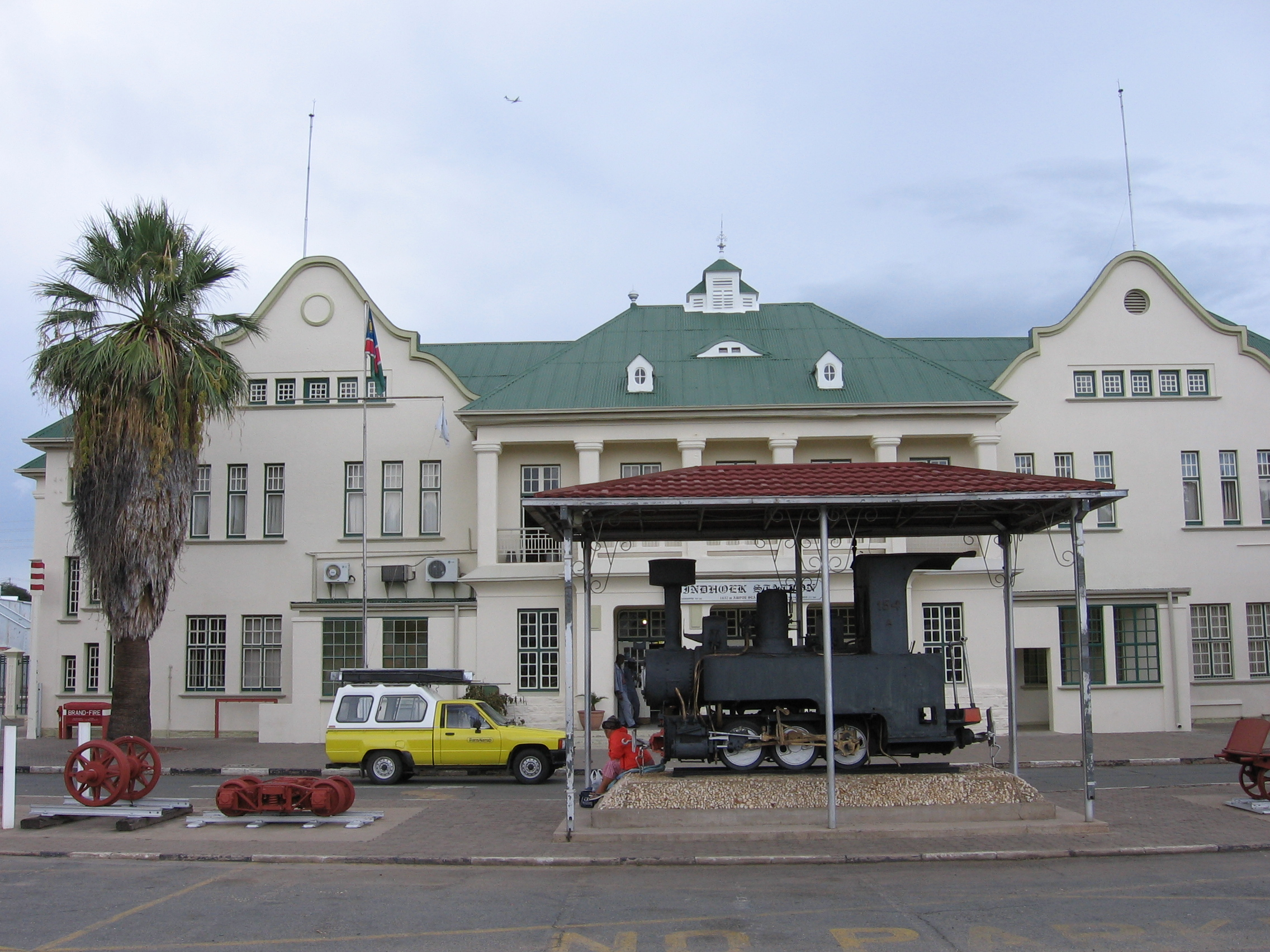
No. 154A plinthed at Windhoek Station, 2006

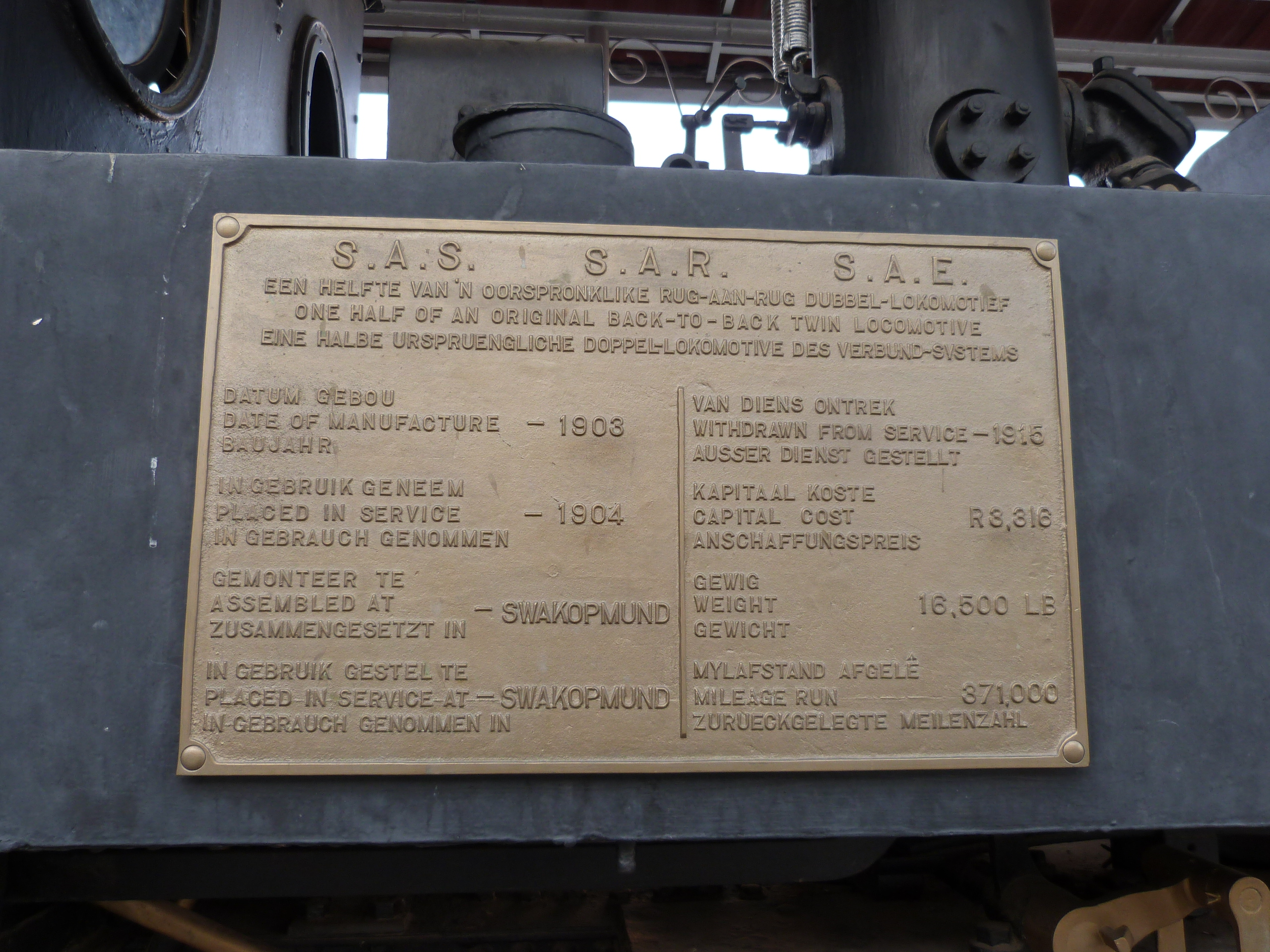
Plaque on no. 154A, 2013

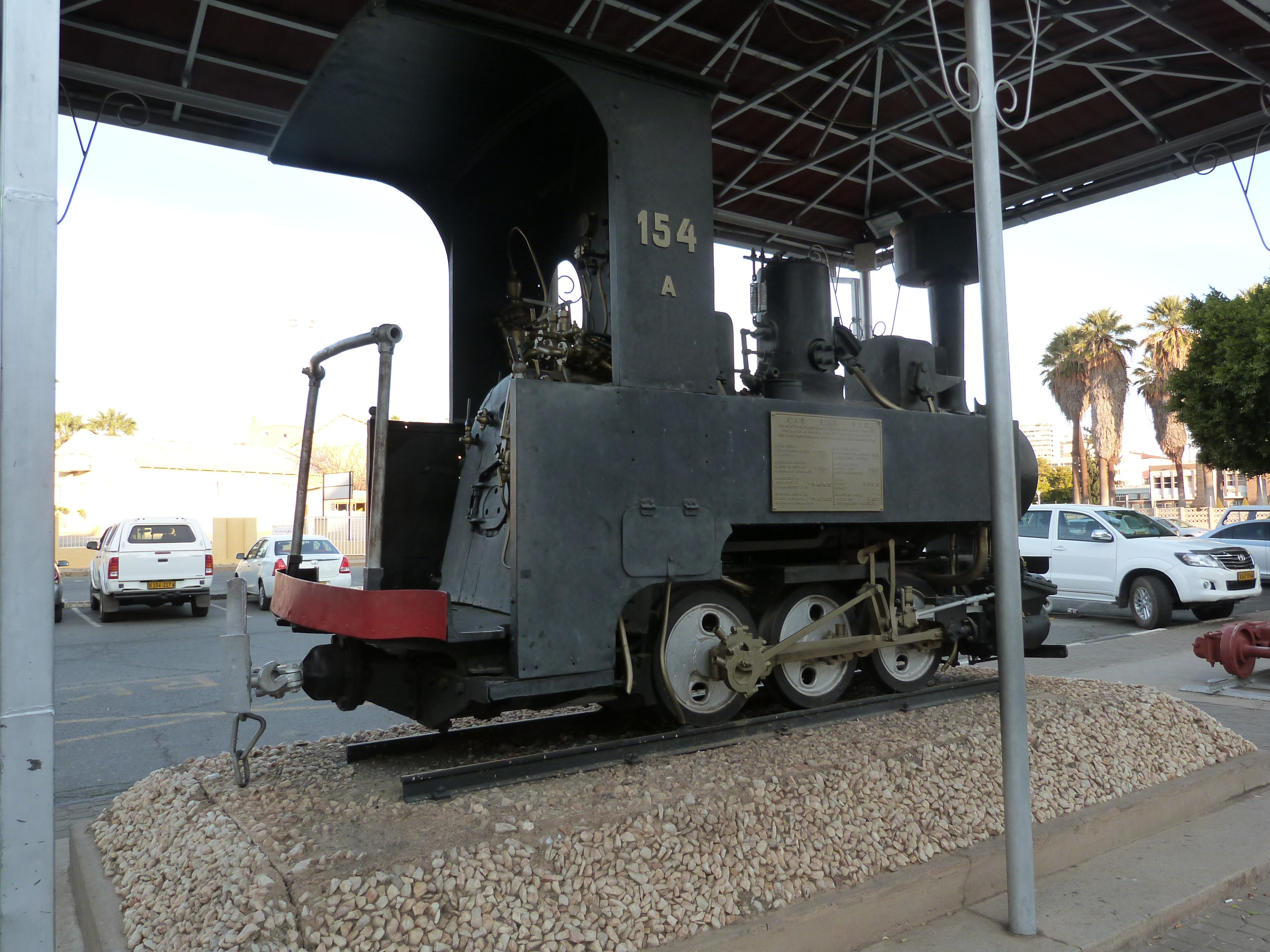
Rear end of no. 154A, 2013
