= Trans-Namib Railroad Museum =

Museum in Windhoek

Trans-Namib Railroad Museum is a museum in Windhoek. It is located in Windhoek Railway Station's building, and was established on 1 July 1993. The museum displays items such as railway equipment and maps, as well as artifacts relating to aviation and seafaring.
