= Ondangwa railway station =

Railway station in Ondangwa, Namibia

General information
- Location: Ondangwa; Namibia
- Coordinates: 17.8998°S 15.9797°E
- Elevation: 1,100 metres (3,600 ft)
- System: Namibian Railway station
- Operator: TransNamib
- Line: Oshikango Walvis Bay line
- Platforms: 2
- Tracks: 5

Construction
- Structure type: At Ground Single-track
- Parking: Available
- Accessible: yes

Other information
- Status: Functional

History
- Electrified: No.
Location

Ondangwa railway station is a railway station serving the town of Ondangwa in Namibia. It is part of the TransNamib Railway.

== Station layout ==
G	Street Level	Exit/Entrance & Ticket Counter
P1	Side platform, No-1 doors will open on the left/right
P1	Track 1
P1	Track 2
P1	Track 3
P1	Track 4
P1	Track 5
P2	Side platform, No- 2 doors will open on the left/right

== Nearest Airport ==
The nearest airports are Ondangwa Airport at Ondangwa, Otjiwarongo Airport at Otjiwarongo.

- List of airports in Namibia

== See also ==
- Rail transport in Namibia
- Transport in Namibia
- Oshana Region
- Ondangwa
- List of countries by rail transport network size
