= Rehoboth railway station =

Railway station in Namibia

Rehoboth
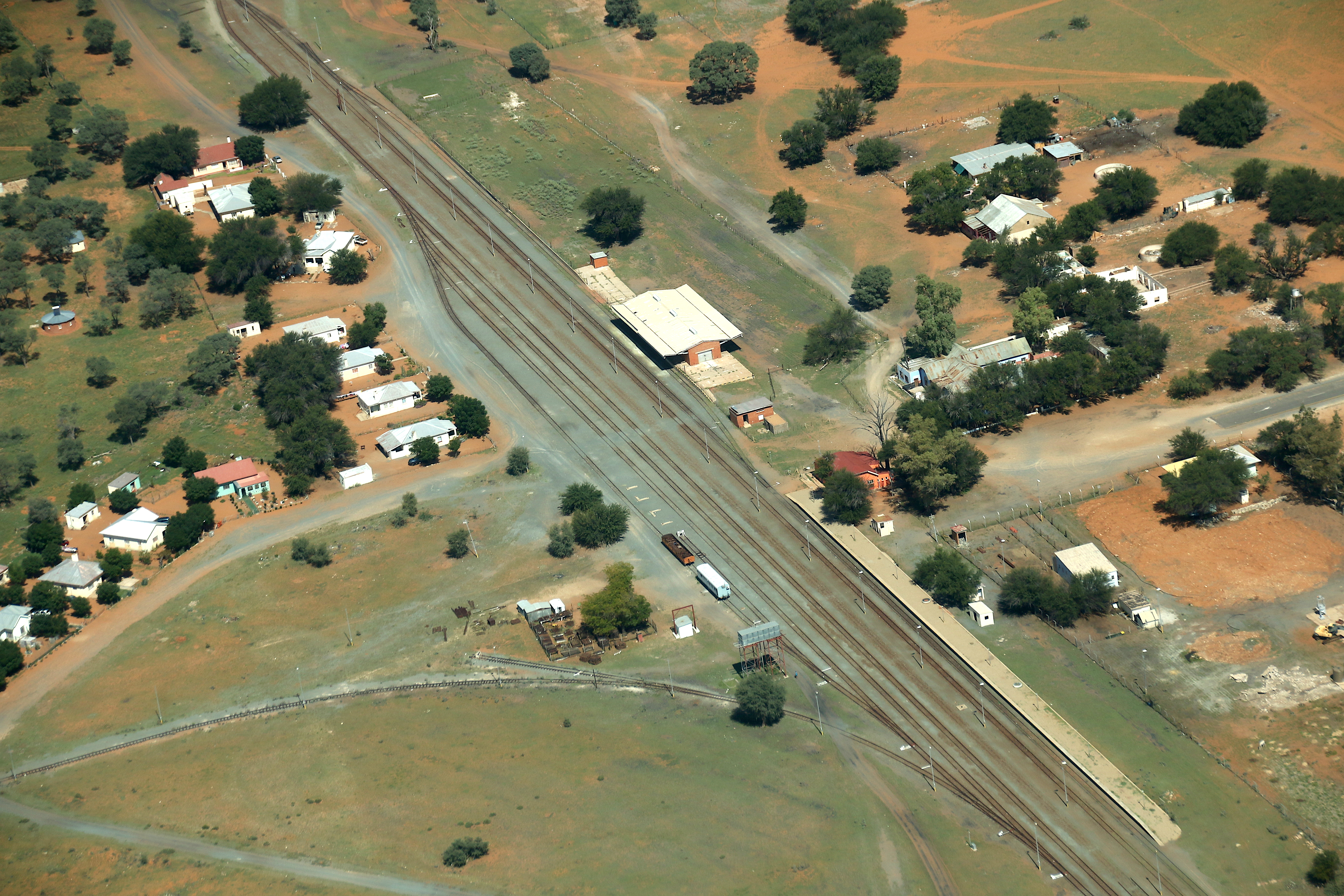
- Aerial view of the station

General information
- Other names: Bahnhoff Train Station
- Location: Vogelpan; Namibia
- Coordinates: 23.31267°S 17.18717°E
- System: TransNamib
- Line: Windhoek–Upington
Location

Rehoboth railway station is a railway station serving the town of Rehoboth in Namibia. It is part of the TransNamib Railway, and is located along the Windhoek to Upington line.

The railway station is situated approximately 12 kilometers east of the town of Rehoboth. When the railway line was constructed in 1910, cost considerations led to the decision not to extend the line directly into the town. Following protests by local authorities in 1912, the government constructed a 60-centimeter narrow-gauge tramway to link the station with the town center. The siding, whose operations began on 15 January 1913, was rented and operated by a Georg Bräuer but was abandoned in the early 1950s.

== See also ==
- Railway stations in Namibia
