= Tses railway station =

Railway station in Namibia

Coordinates: 25°53′00″S 18°00′00″E

Tses is a railway station serving the town of Tses in Namibia. It is part of the TransNamib Railway, and is located along the Windhoek to Upington line that connects Namibia with South Africa.

== See also ==
- Railway stations in Namibia
