= Oshikango railway station =

Railway station in Namibia

General information
- Location: Oshikango; Namibia
- Coordinates: 17.3968°S 15.8793°E
- Elevation: 1,110 metres (3,640 ft)
- System: Namibian Railway station
- Operator: TransNamib
- Line: Oshikango Walvis Bay line
- Platforms: 1
- Tracks: 5

Construction
- Structure type: At Ground Single-track
- Parking: Available
- Accessible: yes

Other information
- Status: Functional

History
- Opened: July 5, 2012; 14 years ago
- Electrified: No.
Location

Oshikango railway station is a terminal railway station on the Namibian-Angolan border serving the village of Oshikango and the town of Helao Nafidi. It is part of the TransNamib Railway railway network. The railway station was inaugurated on 5 July 2012 by the Namibian president Hifikepunye Pohamba.

== Nearest Airport ==
The nearest airports are Ondangwa Airport at Ondangwa, Otjiwarongo Airport at Otjiwarongo.

== See also ==
- Rail transport in Namibia
- Transport in Namibia
- Ohangwena Region
- List of countries by rail transport network size
