= Seeheim railway station =

Railway station in Namibia

Coordinates: 26°48′58″S 17°48′0″E

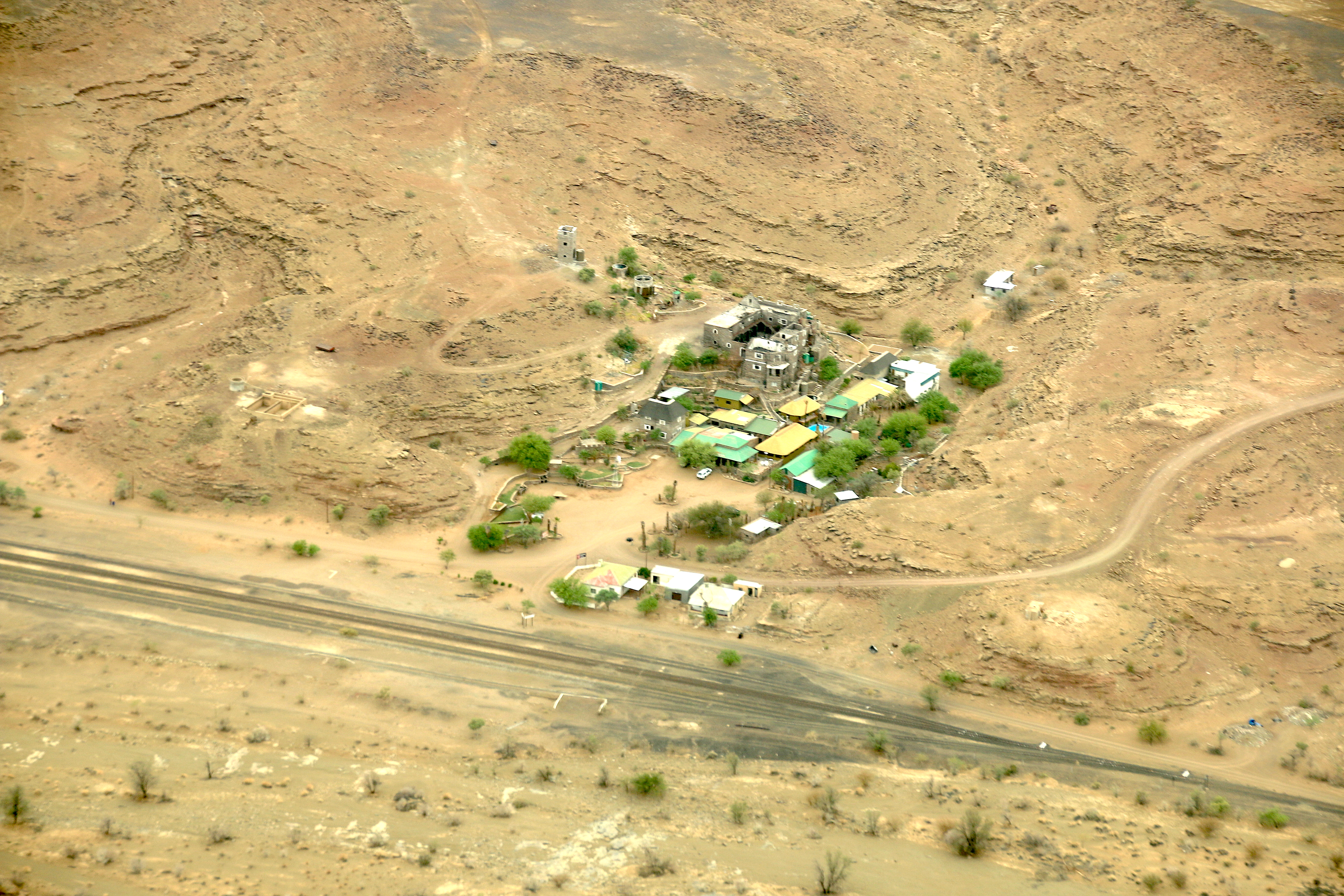
Seeheim Namibia (2018)

Seeheim railway station is a railway station serving the settlement of Seeheim in southern Namibia. It is part of the TransNamib Railway, and is located along the line that leads from Windhoek southwards.

At Seeheim the railway splits; one line continues to Upington, connecting Namibia with South Africa, the other one once led to Lüderitz. The passenger line to Lüderitz has been defunct for many years because the rails were destroyed between Aus and Lüderitz. This missing section is currently being rebuilt. Until its estimated finish in 2010, the few irregular passenger trains to the West end in Aus.

== History ==
Seeheim was founded in 1896 as a base for the German Schutztruppe. During the early 20th century, its sole purpose was that of a junction station where the lines from Keetmanshoop diverted to Lüderitz and Karasburg. The line Keetmanshoop-Lüderitz was built from 1905 to 1908, the line Keetmanshoop-Karasburg in 1909. The First World War was the reason to build these railway links through inhospitable land. Soon however, transport demand peaked due to the diamond rush that developed after a railway worker picked up a diamond near Grasplatz station, 24 kilometers east of Lüderitz. People travelling from the inland to Lüderitz had to stay overnight at Seeheim junction. This was the reason for the erection of two hotels, one of which is again in operation today after standing empty for 30 years.

== See also ==
- History of rail transport in Namibia
