= Seeheim =

- Settlement
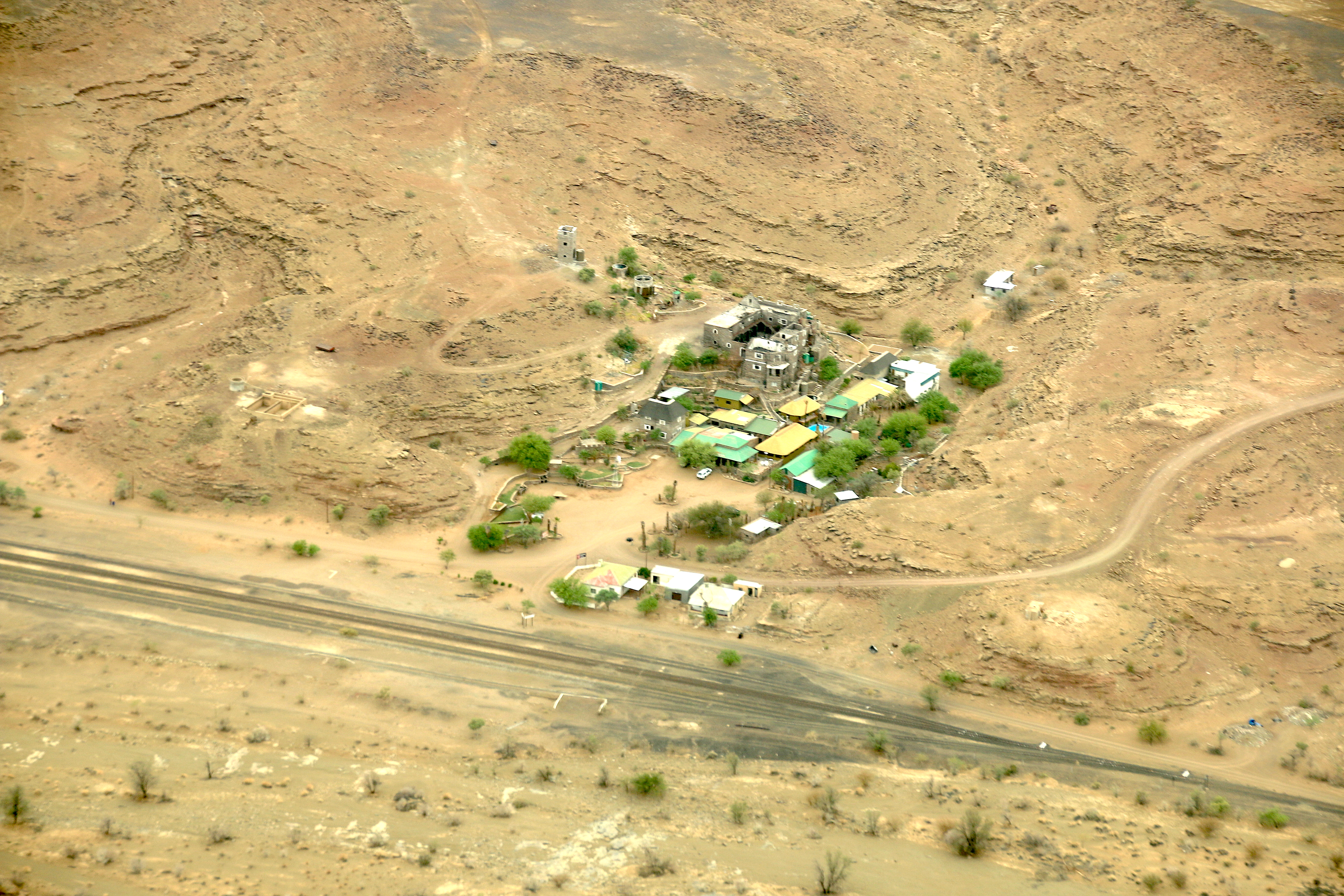
- Aerial view on Seeheim (2018)

- Location in Namibia
- Coordinates: 26°49′S 17°47′E
- Country: Namibia
- Region: ǁKaras Region
- Constituency: Keetmanshoop Rural
- Founded: 1896

Population (2010)
  - Total: 20–30
- Time zone: UTC+2 (South African Standard Time)

Seeheim is a settlement in the Keetmanshoop Rural Constituency ǁKaras Region in southern Namibia. The only notable structures in Seeheim today are the hotel and the railway station; only a handful of people live there. Seeheim belongs to the Keetmanshoop Rural electoral constituency.

== History ==
Seeheim was founded in 1896 as a base for the German Schutztruppe. Early in the 20th century its sole purpose was that of a junction station where the lines from Keetmanshoop diverted to Lüderitz and Karasburg. The line Keetmanshoop-Lüderitz was built from 1905 to 1908, the line Keetmanshoop-Karasburg in 1909. The First World War was the reason to build these railway links through inhospitable land. Soon however, transport demand peaked due to the diamond rush that developed after a railway worker picked up a diamond near Grasplatz station, 24 kilometers east of Lüderitz. People travelling from the inland to Lüderitz had to stay overnight at Seeheim junction. This was the reason for the erection of two hotels, one of which has become operational again after standing empty for 30 years.

In the 1950s, Seeheim was a settlement of considerable size. Afterwards, the town gradually fell into decline. The school closed down and the residents began to leave.

== Transport ==
In 1974 the main road B2 was re-directed, leaving Seeheim in the middle of nowhere with only a small gravel access road, and the railway access.

Seeheim station today is part of the Namibian Railways. The passenger line to Lüderitz has been defunct for many years because the rails have been exposed to the harsh desert environment and erosion - being continuously covered by sand between Aus and Lüderitz. The maintenance and repair of the railway line remains an ongoing struggle for the Namibian Government.

== Economic activities ==
Apart from Seeheim Hotel, a nostalgic stopover for tourists on their way to Fish River Canyon, there is a furniture maker.

== See also ==
- Railway stations in Namibia
