= Gobabis railway station =

Railway station in Gobabis, Namibia

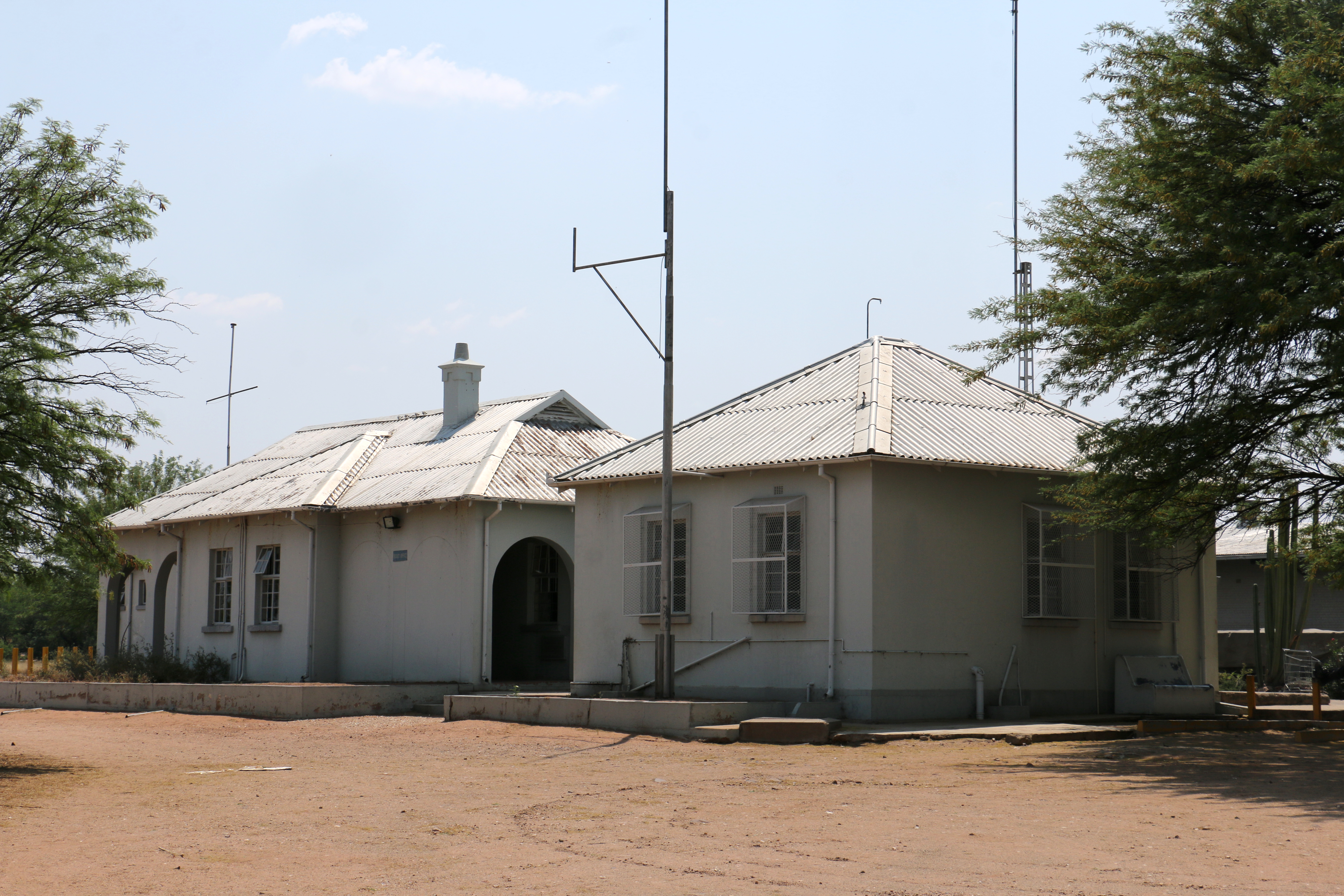
Gobabis railway station

Gobabis railway station is a railway station serving the town of Gobabis in Namibia. It is part of the TransNamib Railway that connects the town with the Namibian capital of Windhoek.

== Gallery ==
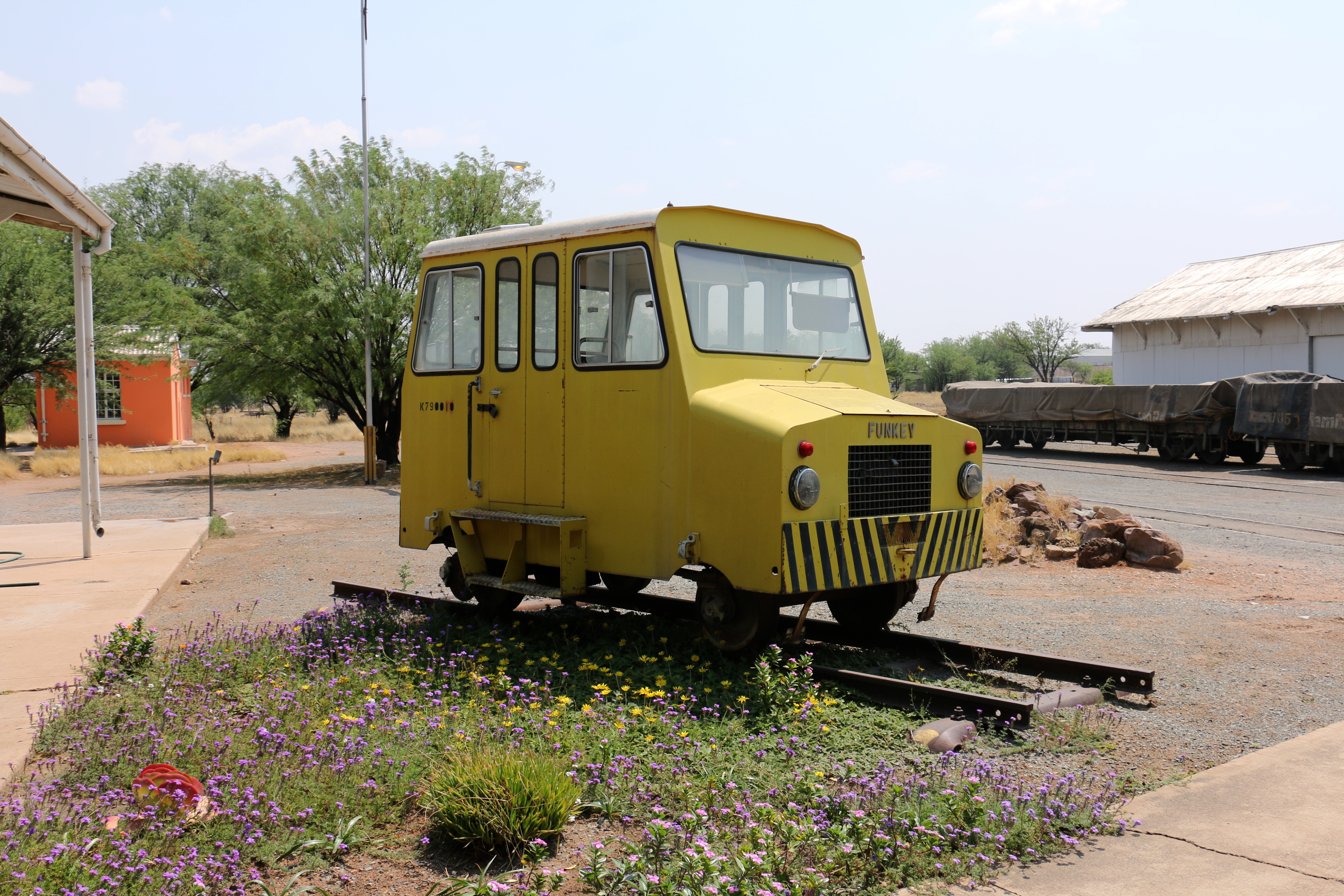
Gobabis railway station

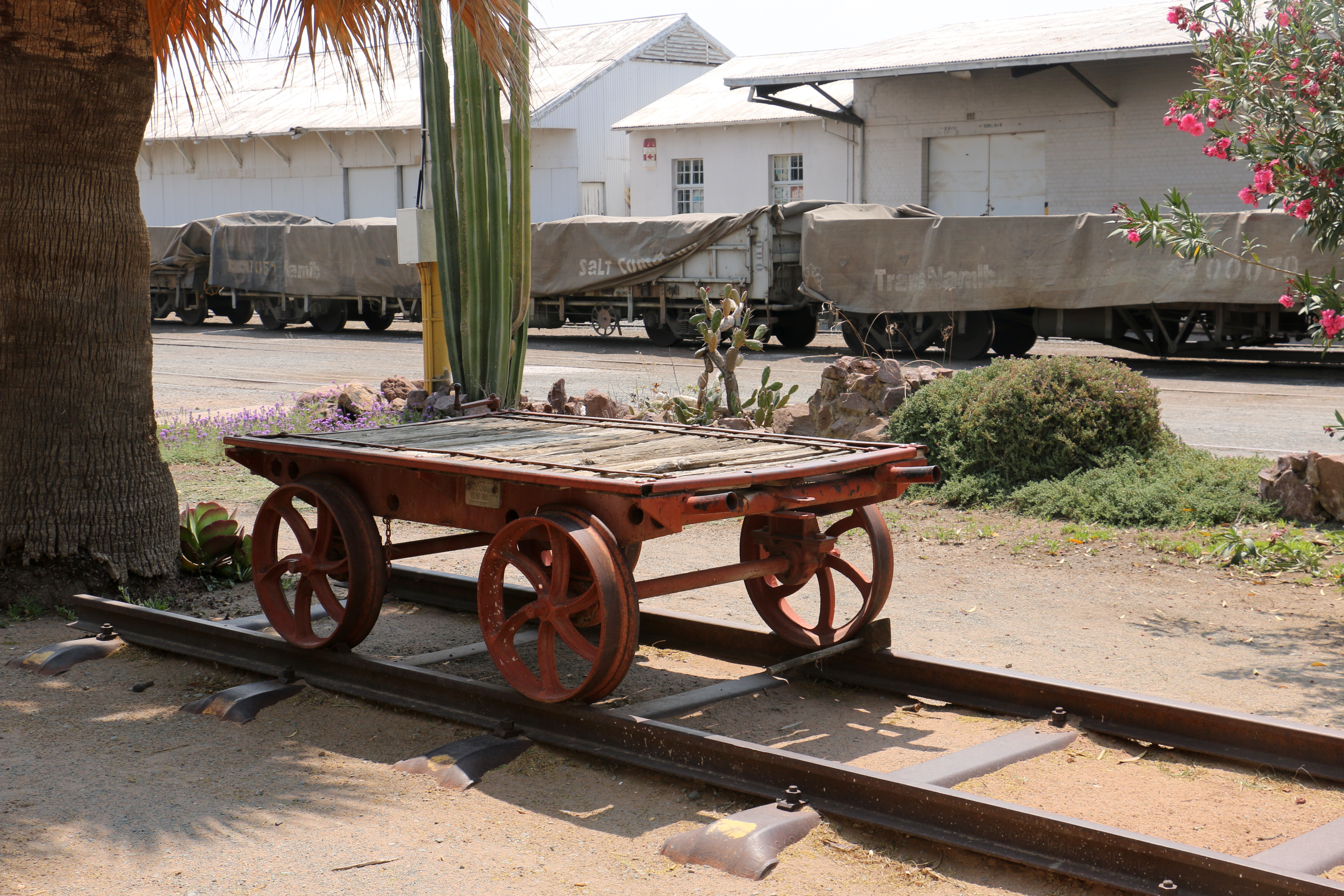
Gobabis railway station
