= Upington railway station =

Railway station in Upington, South Africa

Coordinates: 28.453232°S 21.239952°E

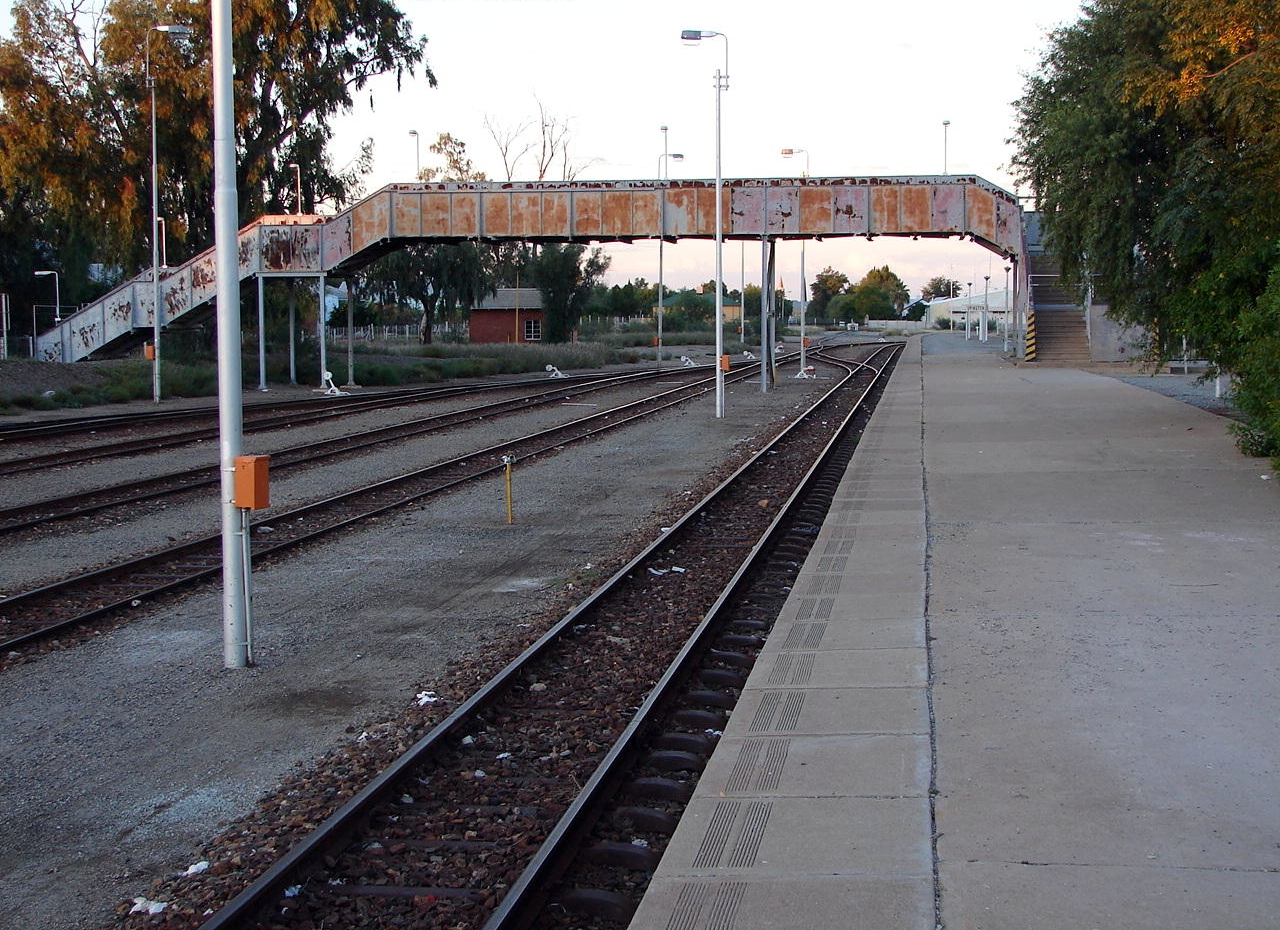
- Upington railway station looking East

General information
- Operated by: Transnet Freight Rail
- Platforms: 1 side, 2 islands
- Tracks: 4
Location

Upington railway station is a railway station serving the town of Upington in South Africa. It has been part of the TransNamib Railway that connected Windhoek with the town. The service stopped early in the 2000s.
