= Otjiwarongo railway station =

Railway station in Namibia

Otjiwarongo railway station is a railway station serving the town of Otjiwarongo in Namibia. It is part of the TransNamib Railway.

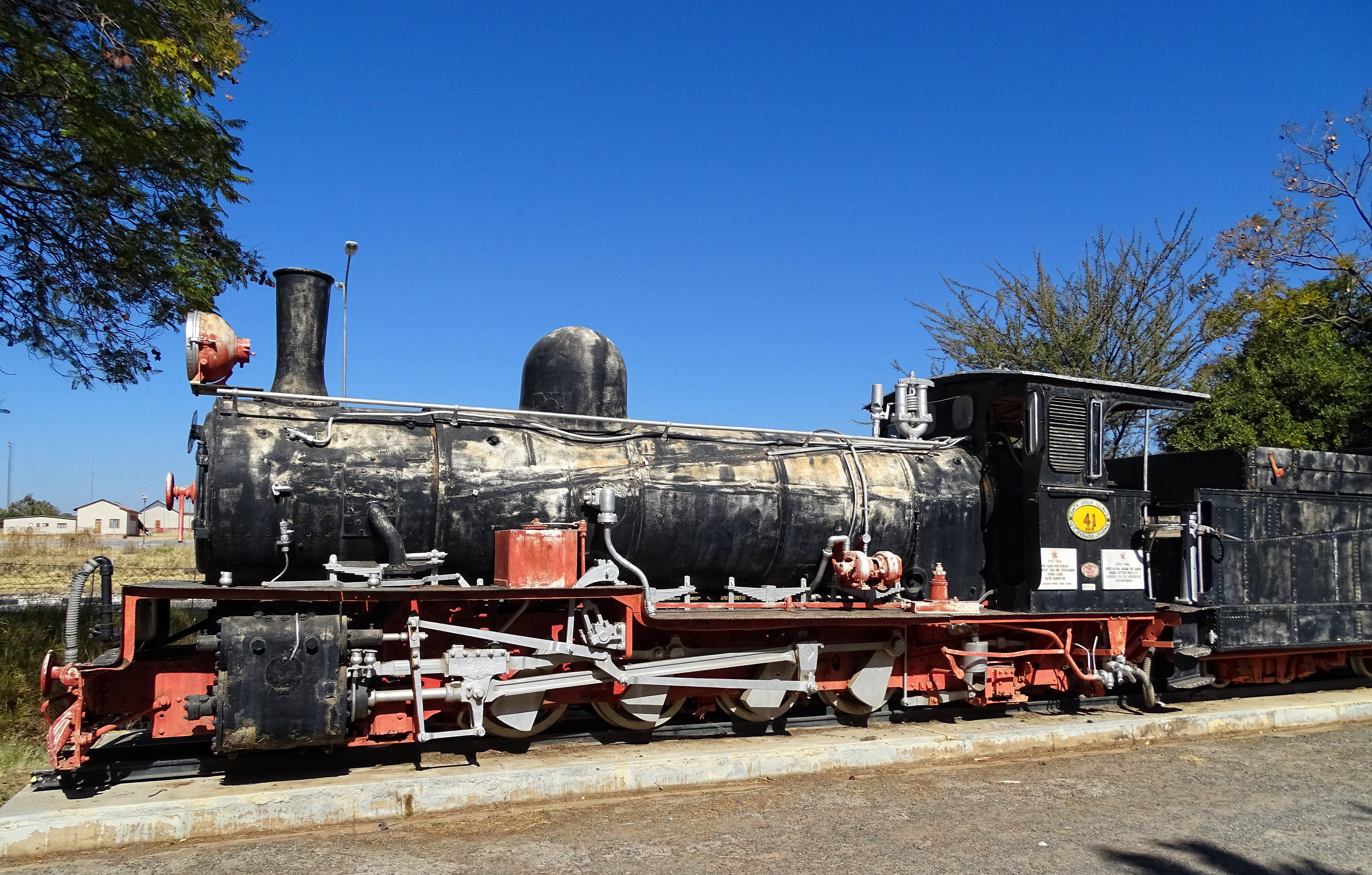
German Class Hd Locomotive no. 41 plinthed at Otjiwarongo railway station
