= Kranzberg railway station =

Railway station in Namibia between the towns of Karibib and Usakos

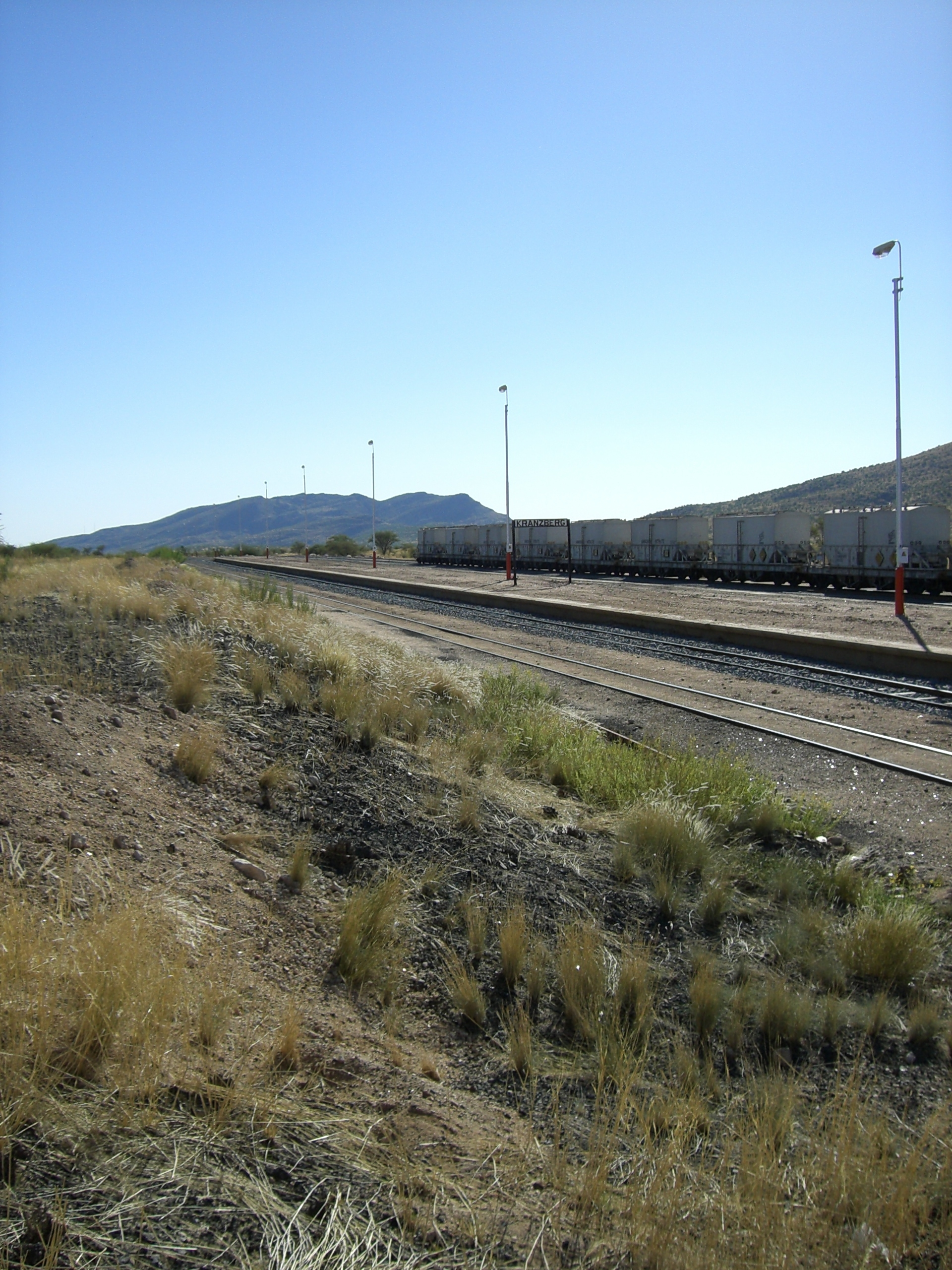

General information
- Coordinates: 21°56′7″S 15°39′57″E
- System: Railway station
- Owner: TransNamib Railway

History
- Opened: 1902
Location

Kranzberg railway station is a railway station in Namibia between the towns of Karibib and Usakos. It is part of the TransNamib Railway. At Kranzberg, the railway line from Windhoek splits; one line continues westwards to Swakopmund and Walvis Bay, the other one continues north-eastwards towards Omaruru and Tsumeb.

The Windhoek—Swakopmund line, commissioned during Imperial Germany's colonial rule of German South West Africa, reached Kranzberg in 1902. In 1914, this line was extended to Walvis Bay. In 1906, Kranzberg was connected to Otavi, a line that was later extended to Grootfontein (1908), Outjo (1921), and Oshikango (2004).

Kranzberg is connected to the south and east of Namibia via Windhoek.

== See also ==
- Rail transport in Namibia
