= Otjiwarongo Airport =

Airport in Namibia

- IATA: OTJ; ICAO: FYOW

Summary
- Airport type: Public
- Serves: Otjiwarongo
- Elevation AMSL: 4,840 ft / 1,475 m
- Coordinates: 20°25′50″S 16°39′45″E

Map
- Location of the airport in Namibia

Runways
Direction	Length		Surface
Direction	m	ft	Surface
09/27	1,800	5,906	Gravel
- Source: GCM Google Maps

Otjiwarongo Airport (IATA: OTJ, ICAO: FYOW) is an airport serving Otjiwarongo, in the Otjozondjupa Region of Namibia.

The Otjiwarongo non-directional beacon (Ident: OW) is near the in-town location of the former Otjiwarongo Center Airport (closed), 3.8 kilometres (2.4 mi) southwest of the current airport.

== See also ==
- List of airports in Namibia
- Transport in Namibia
