= Asab railway station =

Railway station in Namibia

Coordinates: 25.46414°S 17.951°E

Asab railway station is a railway station serving the town of Asab in Namibia. It is part of the TransNamib Railway, and is located along the Windhoek to Upington line that connects Namibia with South Africa.

As of 2019, the train from Windhoek to Keetmanshoop stopped twice a week in both directions. In January 2021, passenger train service was disrupted by heavy rains.
