= Mariental railway station =

Railway station in Namibia

Coordinates: 24.6237°S 17.9607°E

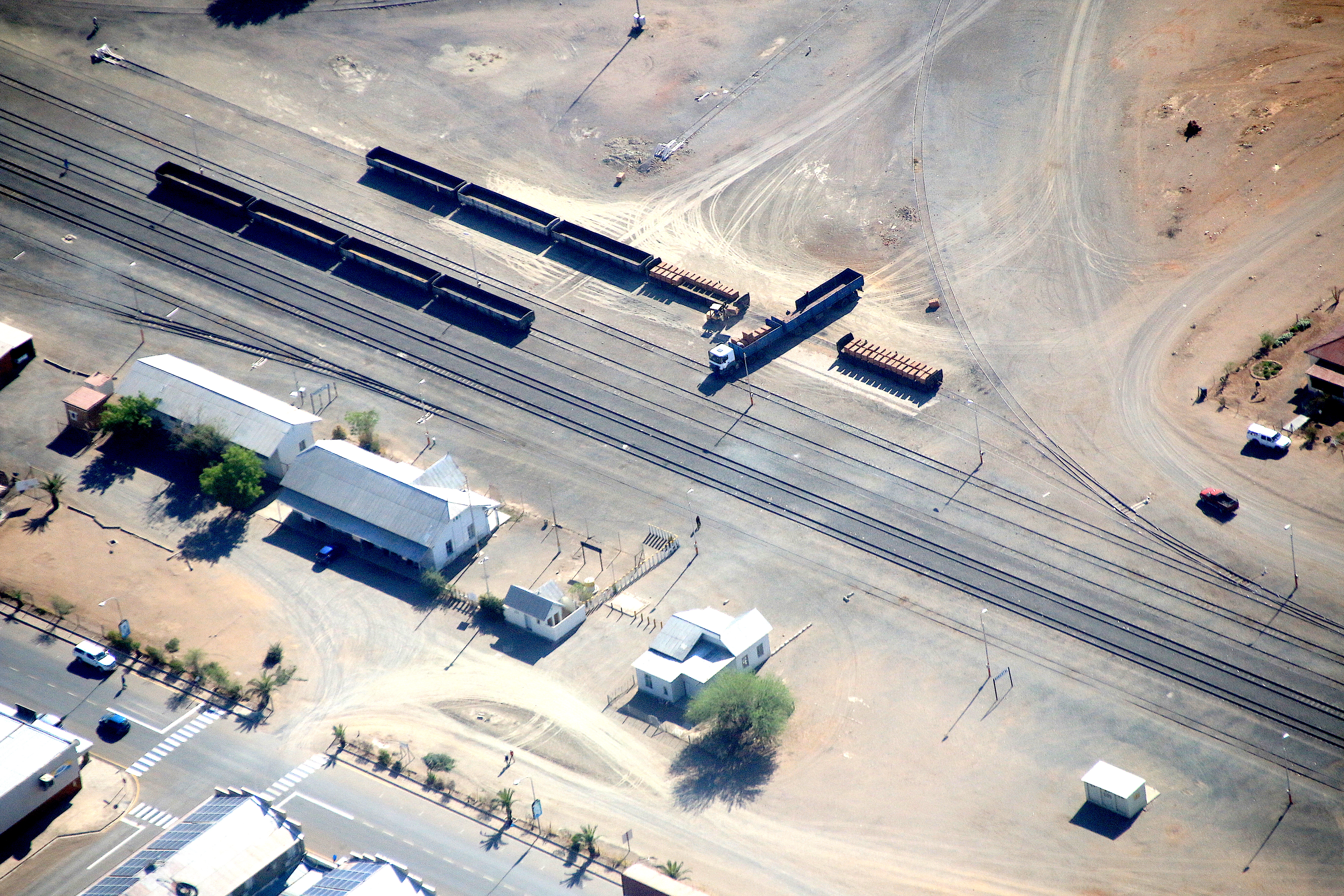
Mariental railway station 2019

Mariental railway station is a railway station serving the town of Mariental in Namibia. It is part of the TransNamib Railway, and is located along the Windhoek to Upington line that connects Namibia with South Africa.
