= ASAB =

ASAB or Asab may refer to:

- Asab, a settlement in Namibia
- Assigned Sex At Birth
- Atlanta and St. Andrews Bay Railroad, a class I railroad which operated in Alabama and Florida
