= South African Class 33-000 =

Model of 65 South African diesel-electric locomotives

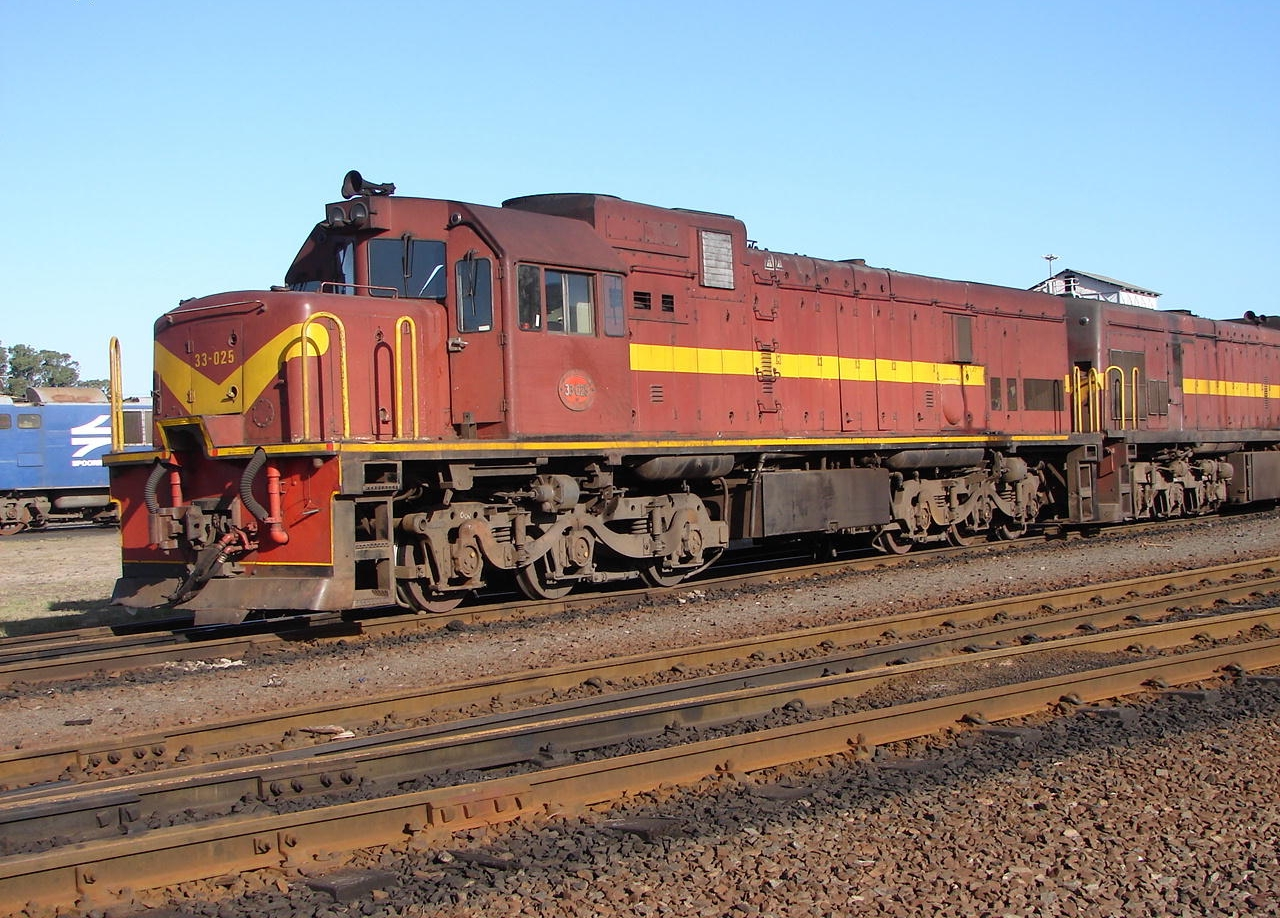
- No. 33-025 at Bellville Loco, 28 March 2009
Type and origin
- Power type: Diesel-electric
- Designer: General Electric
- Builder: General Electric
- Serial number: 35457-35521
- Model: GE U20C
- Build date: 1965-1966
- Total produced: 65
Specifications
- Configuration
  - AAR: C-C
  - UIC: Co'Co'
  - Commonwealth: Co+Co
- Gauge: 3 ft 6 in (1,067 mm) Cape gauge
- Wheel diameter: 915 mm (36.0 in)
- Wheelbase: 12,243 mm (40 ft 2.0 in)
  - Axle spacing (Asymmetrical): 1-2: 1,594 mm (5 ft 2.8 in); 2-3: 1,911 mm (6 ft 3.2 in)
  - Bogie: 3,505 mm (11 ft 6.0 in)
- Pivot centres: 9,017 mm (29 ft 7.0 in)
- Length
  - Over couplers: 16,866 mm (55 ft 4.0 in)
- Width: 2,756 mm (9 ft 0.5 in)
- Height: 3,931 mm (12 ft 10.8 in)
- Axle load: 15,749 kg (34,721 lb)
- Loco weight: 94,494 kg (208,324 lb) max
- Fuel type: Diesel
- Fuel capacity: 3,600 litres (790 imp gal)
- Prime mover: GE 7FDL-12
- RPM range: 400-1,000
  - RPM low idle: 400
  - Maximum RPM: 1000
- Engine type: 4 stroke diesel
- Aspiration: C-B ET13 turbocharger
- Generator: DC 10 pole GE 5GT-581C9
- Traction motors: Six GE 5GE-761A6 DC 4 pole
  - Rating 1 hour: 635A
  - Continuous: 620A @ 20 km/h (12 mph)
- Cylinders: V12
- Gear ratio: 92:19
- MU working: 4 maximum
- Loco brake: 28-LV-1 with vigilance control
- Train brakes: Westinghouse 6CDX4UC compressor/exhauster
- Air tank cap.: 700 litres (150 imp gal)
- Compressor: 0.029 m^{3}/s (1.0 cu ft/s)
- Exhauster: 0.116 m^{3}/s (4.1 cu ft/s)
- Couplers: AAR knuckle (SASKOP DS)
Performance figures
- Maximum speed: 100 km/h (62 mph)
- Power output
  - Starting: 1,605 kW (2,152 hp)
  - Continuous: 1,490 kW (2,000 hp)
- Tractive effort
  - Starting: 223 kN (50,000 lbf) @ 25% adhesion
  - Continuous: 178 kN (40,000 lbf) @ 24 km/h (15 mph)
- Factor of adh.
  - Starting: 25%
  - Continuous: 20%
- Brakeforce: 70% ratio @ 345 kPa (50.0 psi)
- Dynamic brake peak effort: 173 kN (39,000 lbf) @ 26 km/h (16 mph)
Career
- Operators: (South Africa) South African Railways, Transnet Freight Rail (Gabon) COMILOG; Sudan Railways; Zambia Railways (Namibia) TransNamib (Mozambique) CDN (Democratic Republic of the Congo) Company of Transportation and Ports
- Class: Class 33-000
- Number in class: 65
- Numbers: 33-001 to 33-065
- Nicknames: Bosvark
- Delivered: 1965-1966
- First run: 1965

The South African Railways Class 33-000 of 1965 was a diesel-electric locomotive.

In 1965 and 1966, the South African Railways placed sixty-five Class 33-000 General Electric type U20C diesel-electric locomotives in service.

== Manufacturer ==
The South African Class 33-000 type GE U20C diesel-electric locomotive was designed and built for the South African Railways (SAR) by General Electric (GE) and imported. Sixty-five of these locomotives were delivered between June 1965 and January 1966, numbered in the range from 33-001 to 33-065.

== Class 33 series ==
The Class 33 family consisted of three series, the GE-built Classes 33-000 and 33-400 and the General Motors Electro-Motive Division-built Class 33-200. Both manufacturers also produced locomotives for the subsequent SAR Classes 34, 35 and 36.

The two GE-built Classes were virtually identical in appearance, but could be distinguished from each other by some ventilation openings on their bodywork.

- The Class 33-000 had press-formed louvre openings in both short hood doors on the right-hand side of the nose, while the Class 33-400 had no opening in either of these doors.
- Just to the rear of the cab on both sides of the long hood and more or less in line with the cab windows, both models had panels with three ventilation openings. These had two horizontal bars in each opening on the Class 33-000 and press-formed louvre openings on the 33-400.

These doors and panels could get swapped between models and sometimes did, either as replacement for damaged items or by chance during overhauls.

== Service ==
=== In South Africa ===
The Class 33-000 was initially used to dieselise the Cape Midland region. When the Class 34-000 entered service in 1971, the Class 33-000 locomotives were relocated to Transvaal and some later to the Cape Western system.

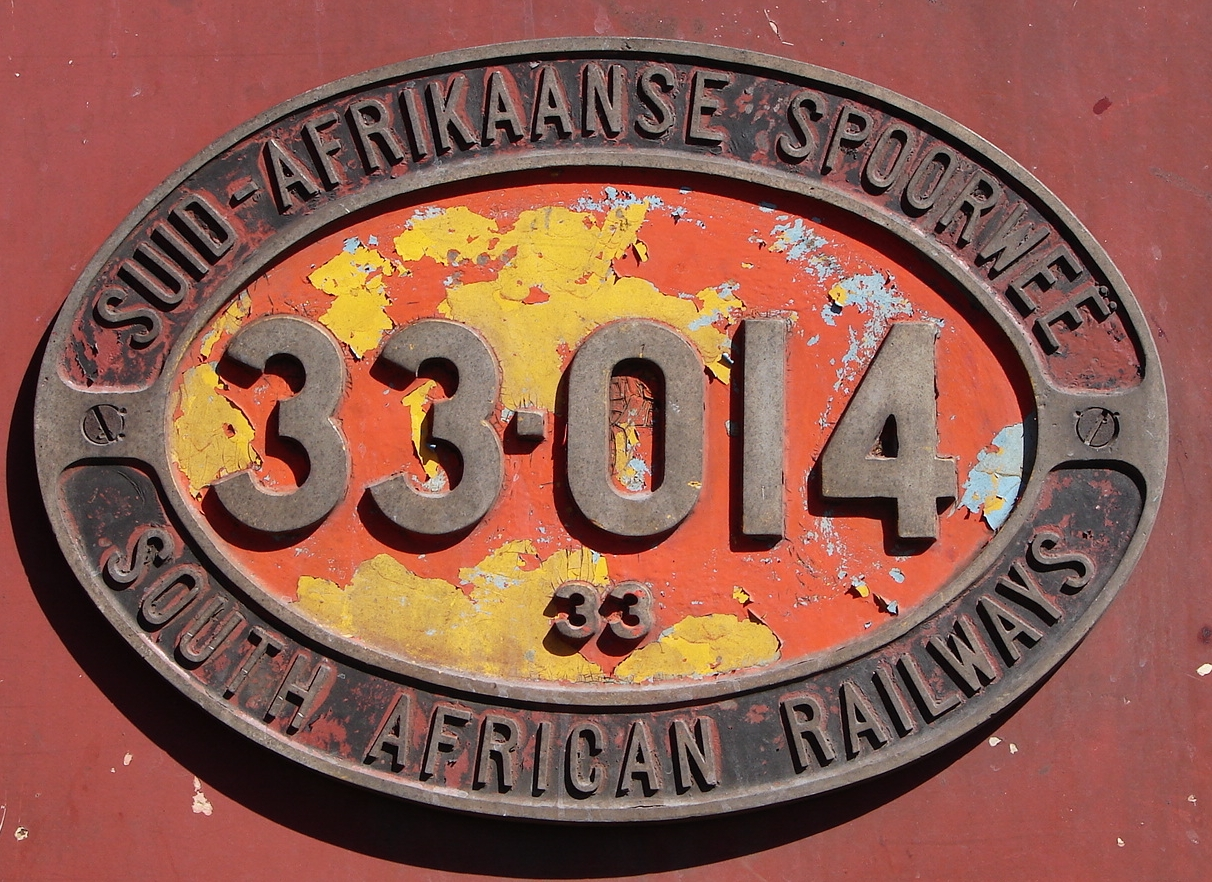

In the SAR era, the inner parts of cabside locomotive number plates were often unofficially painted in various colours to identify the depot to which the locomotive was allocated. Judging from the flaked paint on the plate in the picture alongside, no. 33-014 saw service in several regions over the years.

Most of these locomotives survived in mainline and branch line service well into the twenty-first century, for example on the lines from De Aar to Upington and on the branch line from Worcester to Voorbaai. Some were later employed as heavy shunting engines to assemble or unload iron ore trains at the Sishen-Saldanha iron ore line's terminals, until the arrival of the Class 43-000 on that line in 2011 made more GE-built Class 34 locomotives available for this task.

=== Outside South Africa ===
Between October 1978 and May 1993, Zambia Railways (ZR) hired locomotives to solve its chronic shortages in motive power, mainly from South Africa but at times also from Zaire, Zimbabwe, the TAZARA Railway and even the Zambian copper mines. In Zambia, the South African locomotives were mainly used on goods trains between Livingstone and Kitwe, sometimes in tandem with a ZR locomotive and occasionally also on passenger trains.

Locomotives were selected from a pool of engines which were allocated by the Railways for hire to Zambia. The South African fleet in Zambia was never constant since locomotives were continually exchanged as they became due back in South Africa for their three-monthly servicings.

The locomotives were initially selected from the Classes 33-400, 35-000 and 35-200, but by December 1989 some Class 33-000 locomotives also began to serve one or more tours of duty in Zambia. The pool of Class 33-000 locomotives which were allocated by the Railways for hire to Zambia from time to time included the unit numbers as shown in the table.

Until c. 2015, several still saw service with Spoornet Traction whose locomotives operate in several Southern African countries. A few were leased to Sudan Railways on a long-term contract as a result of the distance from South Africa, while others were sold to COMILOG in Gabon.

=== Mozambique ===
In 2013 some Class 33-000 locomotives were sold to Corredor de Desenvolvimento do Norte (CDN) at Nacala in northern Mozambique. CDN operates a rail link with the land-locked Malawi to the west. These locomotives were refurbished in South Africa prior to being delivered to their new owners.

=== Democratic Republic of the Congo ===
In 2015, some Class 33-000 and Class 33-400 locomotives were sold to the Congolese Company for Transportation and Ports (SCTP, formerly Onatra) in the Democratic Republic of the Congo. These locomotives were also refurbished in South Africa prior to being delivered to their new owners.

== Withdrawal ==
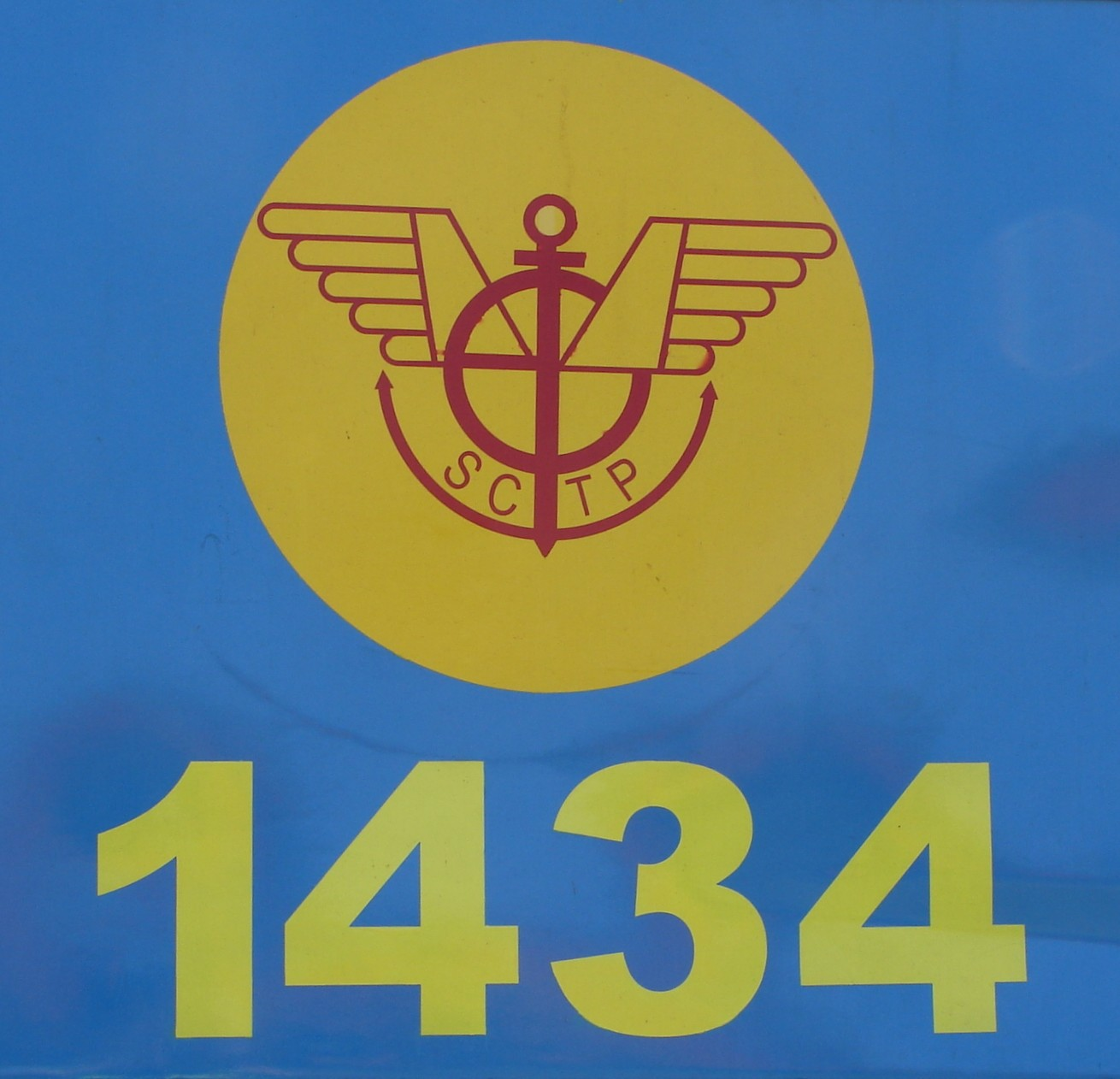
SCTP logo

Although some of the locomotives had been sold to other operators over the years, most of the class remained in South African service for more than fifty years. During 2015, when sufficient numbers of new GE-designed Class 43-000 locomotives had entered service, several of the remaining Class 33-000 units were sold to, amongst others, TransNamib in Namibia and the Congolese Company for Transportation and Ports (SCTP, formerly Onatra) in the Democratic Republic of the Congo. Most of these locomotives were refurbished in South Africa prior to being delivered to their new owners.

== Liveries ==
The class 33-000 were delivered in the new Gulf Red livery with yellow side-stripes on the long hood, a yellow V on each end, signal red buffer beams and unpainted steel cowcatchers. Most of them wore this livery throughout their SAR service life. In the Spoornet era, some of those leased to other countries were painted in a maroon livery with yellow and blue chevron buffer beams and inscribed "Spoornet Traction" on the long hood sides.

== Works numbers ==
The Class 33-000 builder's works numbers, service in the Zambia Railways leasing pool and known eventual disposition are listed in the table.

Class 33-000, type GE U20C
Loco no.	Works no.	Leased to	Post-SAR owner	Post-SAR no.
33-001	35457	Zambia		
33-002	35458		TransNamib	002
33-003	35459		Withdrawn	
33-004	35460	Sudan		3506
33-005	35461		Withdrawn	
33-006	35462	Zambia	TransNamib	006
33-007	35463			
33-008	35464		TransNamib	008
33-009	35465			
33-010	35466		Congo	
33-011	35467	Zambia		
33-012	35468	Zambia	Congo	
33-013	35469	Zambia	TransNamib	013
33-014	35470			
33-015	35471			
33-016	35472			
33-017	35473		TransNamib	017
33-018	35474			
33-019	35475	Zambia	Withdrawn	
33-020	35476	Zambia		
33-021	35477	Zambia	Withdrawn	
33-022	35478	Zambia		
33-023	35479	Zambia	Congo	
33-024	35480	Zambia	Withdrawn	
33-025	35481	Zambia		
33-026	35482	Zambia	Withdrawn	
33-027	35483		COMILOG	
33-028	35484	Zambia, Sudan		3501 to 3
33-029	35485	Zambia	Withdrawn	
33-030	35486	Zambia	TransNamib	030
33-031	35487	Zambia	Congo	
33-032	35488	Zambia		
33-033	35489	Zambia		
33-034	35490	Zambia		
33-035	35491	Zambia		
33-036	35492	Zambia		
33-037	35493		COMILOG	
33-038	35494	Zambia		
33-039	35495	Zambia	Congo	
33-040	35496	Zambia		
33-041	35497	Zambia	TransNamib	041
33-042	35498	Zambia		
33-043	35499	Zambia		
33-044	35500	Zambia		
33-045	35501	Zambia		
33-046	35502	Zambia, Sudan		3501 to 3
33-047	35503	Zambia	Withdrawn	
33-048	35504	Sudan		3501 to 3
33-049	35505			
33-050	35506	Sudan		3504
33-051	35507		TransNamib	051
33-052	35508		Scrapped	
33-053	35509		Congo	
33-054	35510	Sudan		3505
33-055	35511			
33-056	35512			
33-057	35513		Congo	
33-058	35514			
33-059	35515		TransNamib	059
33-060	35516		Congo	
33-061	35517			
33-062	35518		Congo	
33-063	35519			
33-064	35520			
33-065	35521		Congo	

== Illustration ==
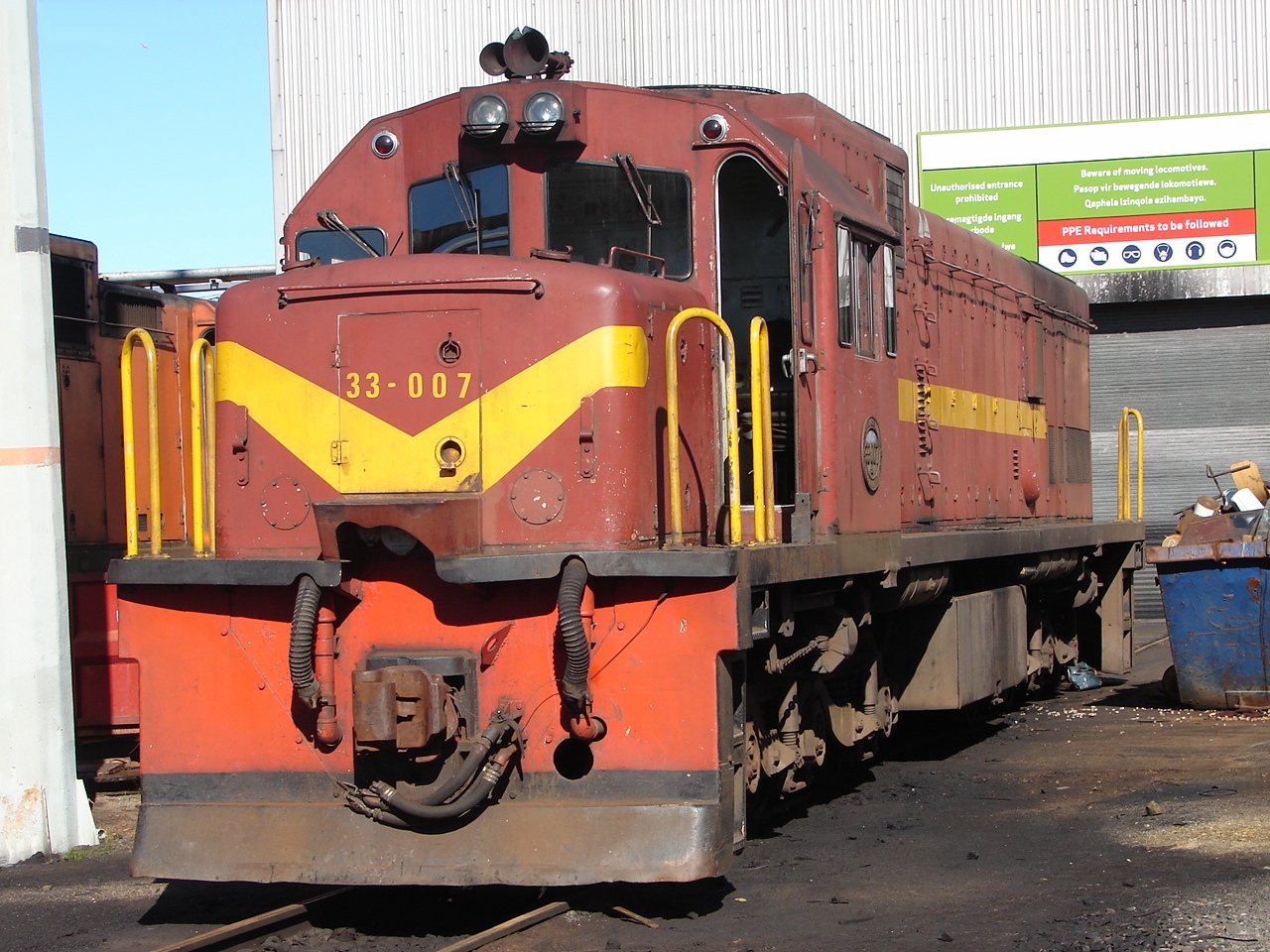
No. 33-007 in South African Railways livery at Bellville Loco Depot, Cape Town, 27 June 2009

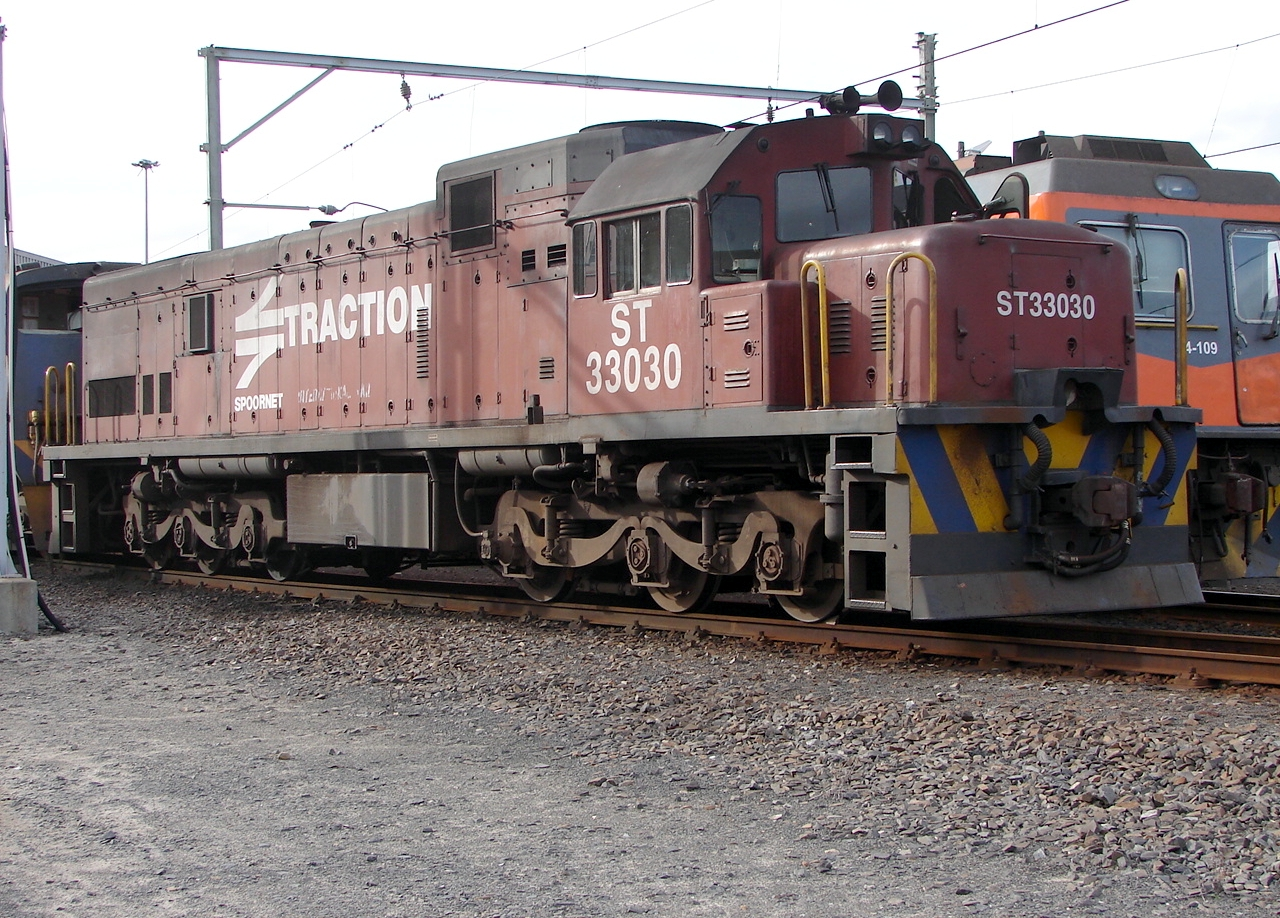
No. 33-030 in Spoornet Traction livery, Bellville Loco Depot, Cape Town, 24 May 2009

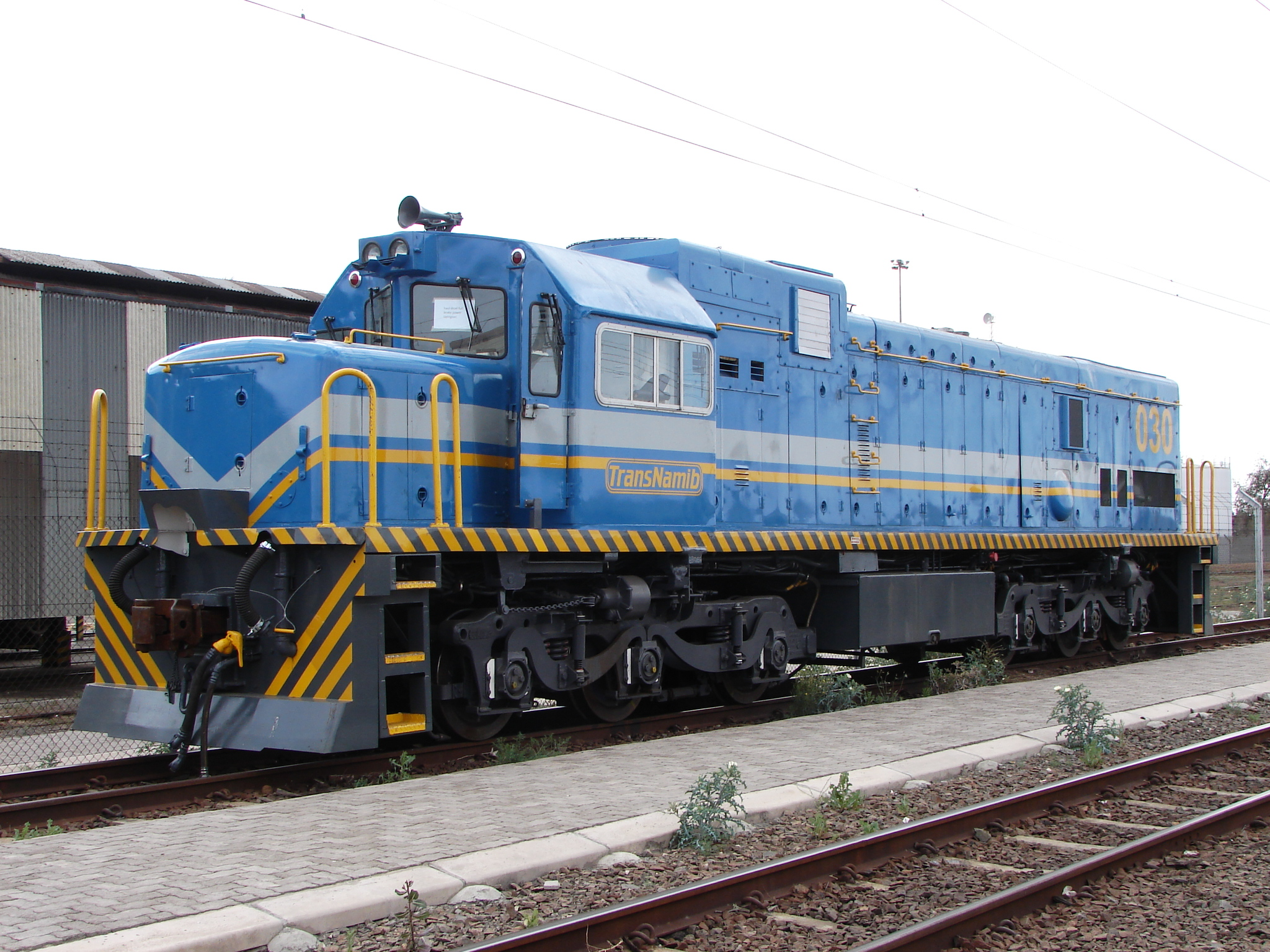
No. 33-030 in TransNamib livery and numbered 030, De Aar, Northern Cape, 9 October 2015

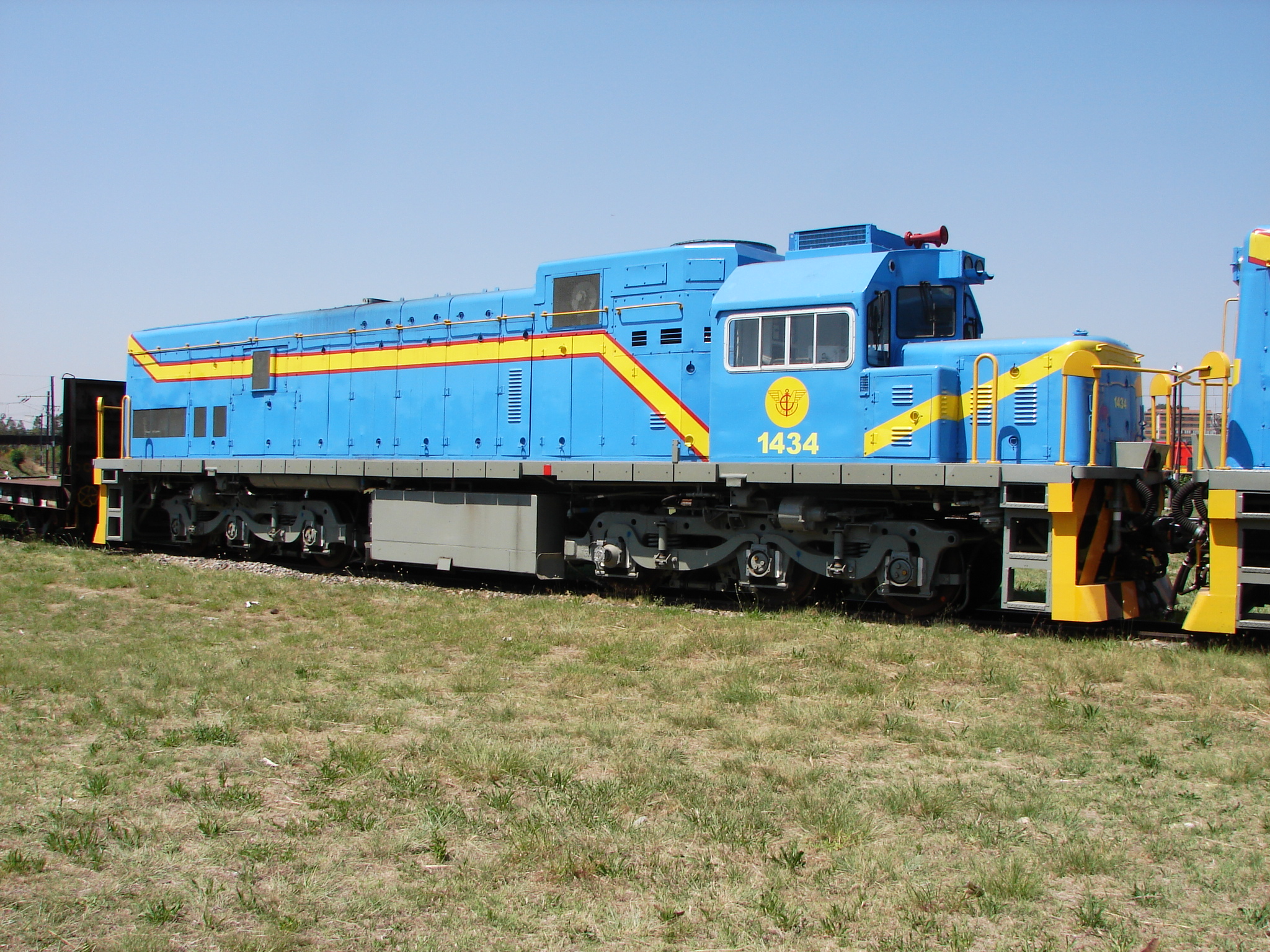
Class 33-000 no. 1434, sold to the Congolese SCTP, at Koedoespoort, 29 September 2015
