= South African Class 33-200 =

Type of diesel electric locomotive

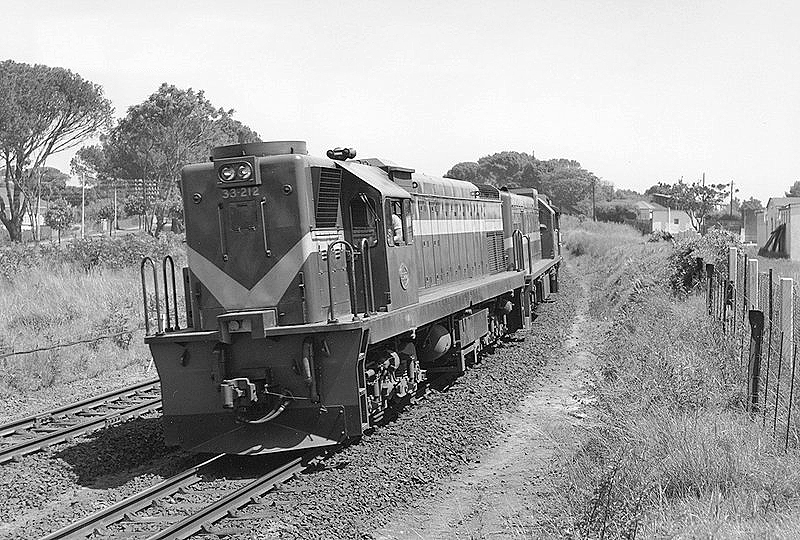
- Class 33-200 no. 33-212 and Class 33-000 no. 33-023, 8 January 1970
Type and origin
- Power type: Diesel-electric
- Designer: General Motors Electro-Motive Division
- Builder: General Motors Electro-Motive Division
- Serial number: 31191-31210
- Model: GM-EMD GL26MC
- Build date: 1966-1967
- Total produced: 20
Specifications
- Configuration
  - AAR: C-C
  - UIC: Co′Co′
  - Commonwealth: Co+Co
- Gauge: 3 ft 6 in (1,067 mm) Cape gauge
- Wheel diameter: 915 mm (36.0 in)
- Wheelbase: 13,900 mm (45 ft 7.2 in)
  - Axle spacing (Asymmetrical): 1-2: 1,600 mm (5 ft 3.0 in); 2-3: 2,007 mm (6 ft 7.0 in)
  - Bogie: 3,607 mm (11 ft 10.0 in)
- Pivot centres: 10,516 mm (34 ft 6.0 in)
- Length
  - Over couplers: 17,474 mm (57 ft 4.0 in)
- Width: 2,819 mm (9 ft 3.0 in)
- Height: 3,943 mm (12 ft 11.2 in)
- Axle load: 15,749 kg (34,721 lb)
- Adhesive weight: 94,494 kg (208,324 lb)
- Loco weight: 94,494 kg (208,324 lb)
- Fuel type: Diesel
- Fuel capacity: 4,300 litres (950 imp gal)
- Prime mover: EMD 16-645E
- RPM range: 315-900
  - RPM low idle: 315
  - RPM idle: 435
  - Maximum RPM: 900
- Engine type: 2-stroke diesel
- Displacement: 10.57 litres (645.0 cu in)
- Generator: DC 12 pole GM-EMD D-32S
- Traction motors: Six GM-EMD D-29CC-7 DC 4 pole
  - Rating 1 hour: 485A
  - Continuous: 450A @ 19 km/h (12 mph)
- Cylinders: V16
- Gear ratio: 57:16
- MU working: 4 maximum
- Loco brake: 28-LV-1 with vigilance control
- Train brakes: Gardner-Denver ADJV-8003 compressor/exhauster
- Air tank cap.: 450 litres (99 imp gal)
- Compressor: 0.029 m^{3}/s (1.0 cu ft/s)
- Exhauster: 0.116 m^{3}/s (4.1 cu ft/s)
- Couplers: AAR knuckle (SASKOP DS)
Performance figures
- Maximum speed: 100 km/h (62 mph)
- Power output
  - Starting: 1,640 kW (2,200 hp)
  - Continuous: 1,490 kW (2,000 hp)
- Tractive effort
  - Starting: 223 kN (50,000 lbf) @ 25% adh.
  - Continuous: 178 kN (40,000 lbf) @ 24 km/h (15 mph)
- Factor of adh.
  - Starting: 25%
  - Continuous: 20%
- Brakeforce: 70% ratio @ 345 kPa (50.0 psi)
- Dynamic brake peak effort: 165 kN (37,000 lbf) @ 30 km/h (19 mph)
Career
- Operators: South African Railways; Spoornet; Sheltam; SitaRail, Côte d'Ivoire; Sudan Railways; Nkana Mine
- Class: Class 33-200
- Number in class: 20
- Numbers: 33-201 to 33-220
- Nicknames: Brommer
- Delivered: 1966-1967
- First run: 1966
- Withdrawn: c. 2000

The South African Railways Class 33-200 of 1966 was a diesel-electric locomotive.

Between October 1966 and May 1967 the South African Railways placed twenty Class 33-200 General Motors Electro-Motive Division type GL26MC diesel-electric locomotives in service.

== Manufacturer ==
The Class 33-200 type GM-EMD GL26MC diesel-electric locomotive was designed and built for the South African Railways (SAR) by General Motors Electro-Motive Division (GM-EMD) and imported. They were delivered between October 1966 and May 1967 and numbered in the range from 33-201 to 33-220.

== Class 33 series ==
The Class 33-200 was the first GM-EMD diesel-electric locomotive to be placed in service by the SAR. The Class 33 consisted of three series, the General Electric (GE) Class 33-000 and 33-400 and the GM-EMD Class 33-200. Both manufacturers also produced locomotives for the subsequent SAR Classes 34, 35 and 36.

Of the three series, the Class 33-200 was the only one to be delivered with a high short hood.

== Service ==
=== South African Railways ===
The Class 33-200 locomotives spent their entire SAR working lives operating out of East London. After some of the locomotives were sold by the SAR, their dynamic braking equipment, located in the high short hood, was removed by some of the new owners and the short hoods were rebuilt to low noses. In the process their starting power output was reduced from 1,640 to 1,490 kilowatts (2,200 to 2,000 horsepower).

Between 1991 and 1992, the remaining Spoornet locomotives were similarly modified and placed in shunting service around East London. All of them were eventually withdrawn and sold by Spoornet and several are still operating in other parts of Africa.

=== Traxtion Sheltam ===
Of the original twenty locomotives, eleven were still in service with Sheltam by 2010, two having first served at Douglas Colliery as numbers D8 and D9. Sheltam is a locomotive leasing and repair company. All their serving Class 33-200 locomotives have had their short hoods modified to low noses.

Three more locomotives were bought by Sheltam for spare parts and are believed now to be scrapped. Sheltam initially numbered all their locomotives from no. 1 upwards, but have since renumbered them according to their horsepower.

=== Other operators ===
Of the remainder, four locomotives went to SitaRail in Côte d'Ivoire, one to the Sudan Railways and one to the Nkana mine of Mopani Copper Mines in Zambia.

== Works numbers ==
The Class 33-200 builder's works numbers and disposition are listed in the table.

Class 33-200, type GM-EMD GL26MC
SAR No.	GM-EMD works no.	Post-SAR owner	Post-SAR no.	Sheltam new no.
33-201	31191	Sheltam	Spare parts	
33-202	31192	SitaRail	CC 2001	
33-203	31193	Sheltam	1	2001
33-204	31194	SitaRail	CC 2003	
33-205	31195	Sheltam	14	2008
33-206	31196	Sheltam	8	2004
33-207	31197		D8	
33-208	31198	Sheltam	Spare parts	
33-209	31199	SitaRail	CC 2004	
33-210	31200	Sheltam	15	2009
33-211	31201		D9	
33-212	31202	Nkana	1	
33-213	31203	Sheltam	13	2007
33-214	31204	SitaRail	CC 2002	
33-215	31205	Sheltam	12	2006
33-216	31206	Sheltam	3	2003
33-217	31207	Sheltam	2	2002
33-218	31208	Sheltam	16	2010
33-219	31209	Sheltam	17	2011
33-220	31210	Sudan Ry		

== Illustration ==
The main picture shows Class 33-200 no. 33-212 on 8 January 1970 with its original high short hood and in the SAR Gulf Red livery, leading General Electric-built Class 33-000 no. 33-023 on a passenger train near Vincent, Eastern Cape. The following pictures show some of these locomotives with low short hoods in various liveries.

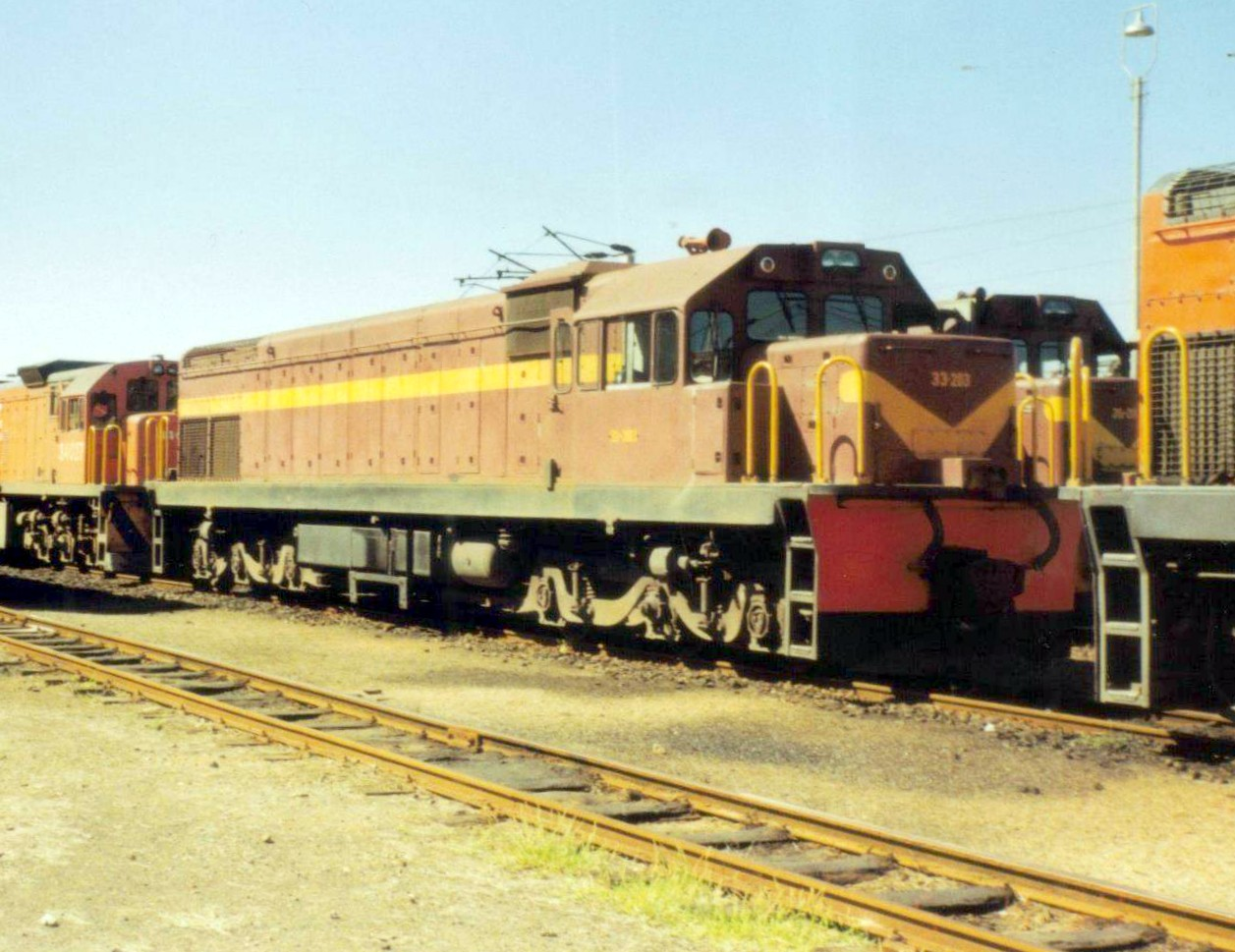
No. 33-203 in SAR Gulf Red and whiskers, Cambridge depot, East London, 26 December 1996

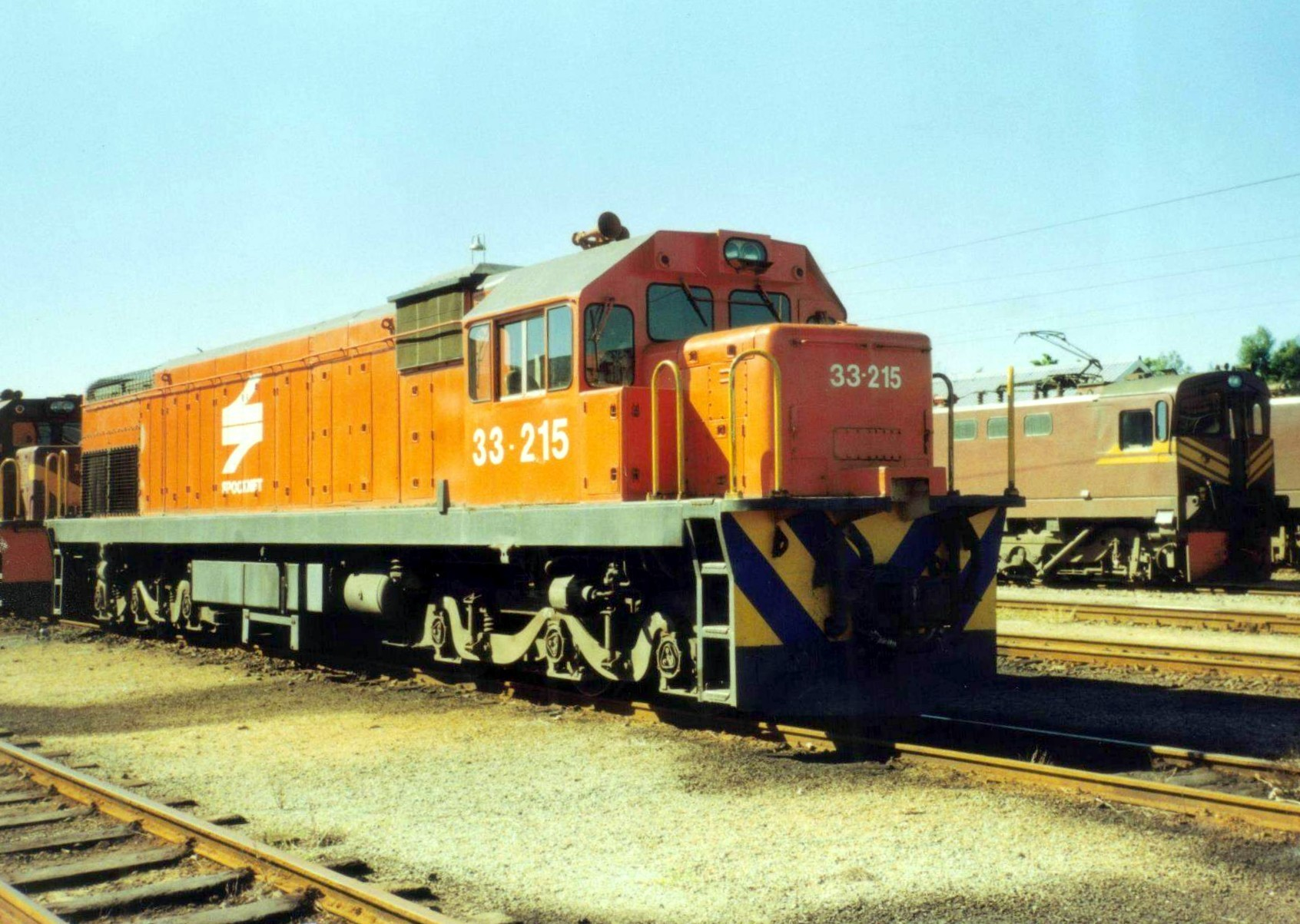
No. 33-215 in Spoornet orange livery, Cambridge depot, East London, 26 December 1996

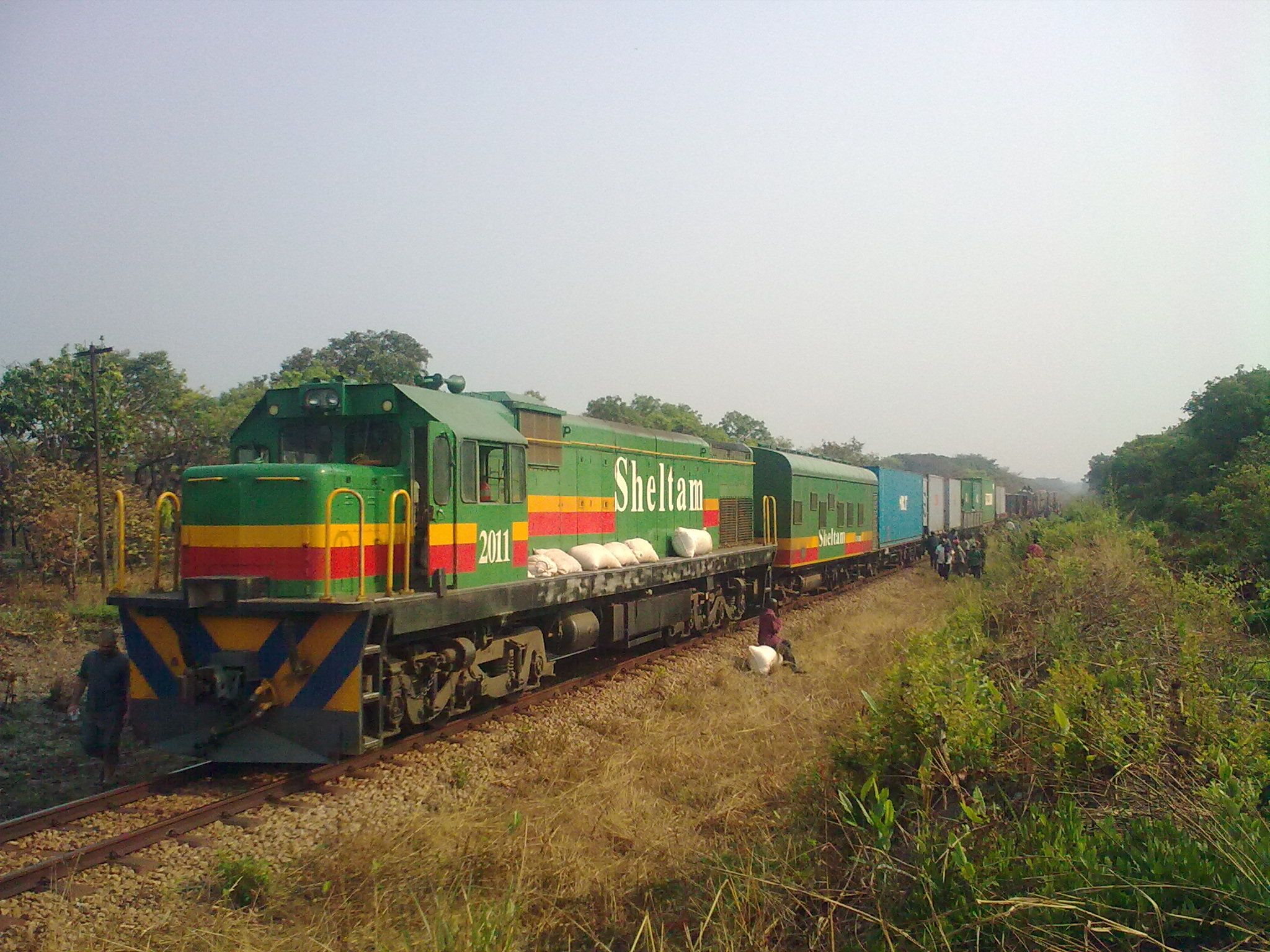
Ex SAR no. 33-219, now Sheltam no. 2011, Kamina, Democratic Republic of the Congo, 2 September 2010
