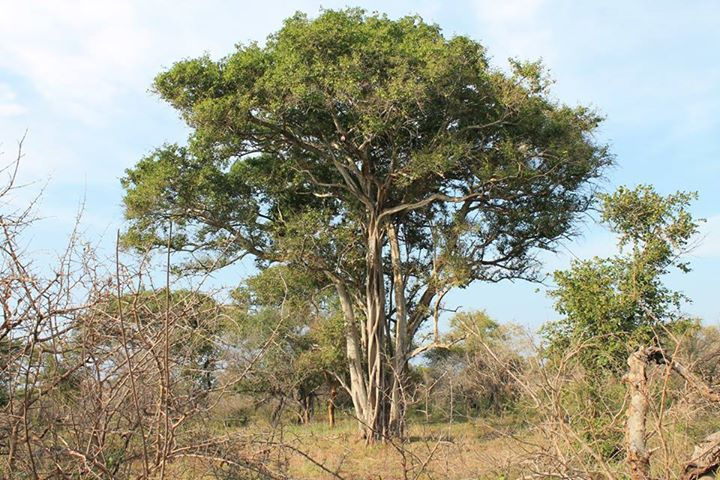

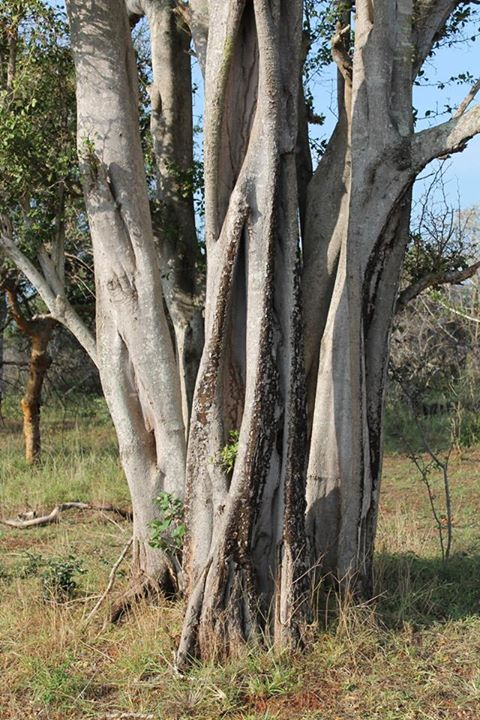

Scientific classification
- Kingdom: Plantae
- Clade: Tracheophytes
- Clade: Angiosperms
- Clade: Eudicots
- Clade: Rosids
- Order: Zygophyllales
- Family: Zygophyllaceae
- Genus: Balanites
- Species: B. maughamii

Binomial name
- Balanites maughamii Sprague

= Balanites maughamii =

Torchwood

Species of tree

Balanites maughamii (manduro, torchwood, Afrikaans: Groendoring, Zulu: Ugobandlovu) is a species of tree native to southern and eastern Africa. It ranges from Kenya through Tanzania, Malawi, Mozambique, Zambia, Zimbabwe, the Caprivi Strip of Namibia, Eswatini, and the Northern Provinces and KwaZulu-Natal in South Africa. It is deciduous or semi-deciduous, growing to 20 (–25) meters tall, with a rounded and spreading crown. It has a fluted trunk up to 1.3 m in diameter. It rarely grows as a low shrub 1.5 to 2 m tall.

It is a protected tree in South Africa.

Groendoring, a community outside Asab in Southern Namibia is named after this tree.

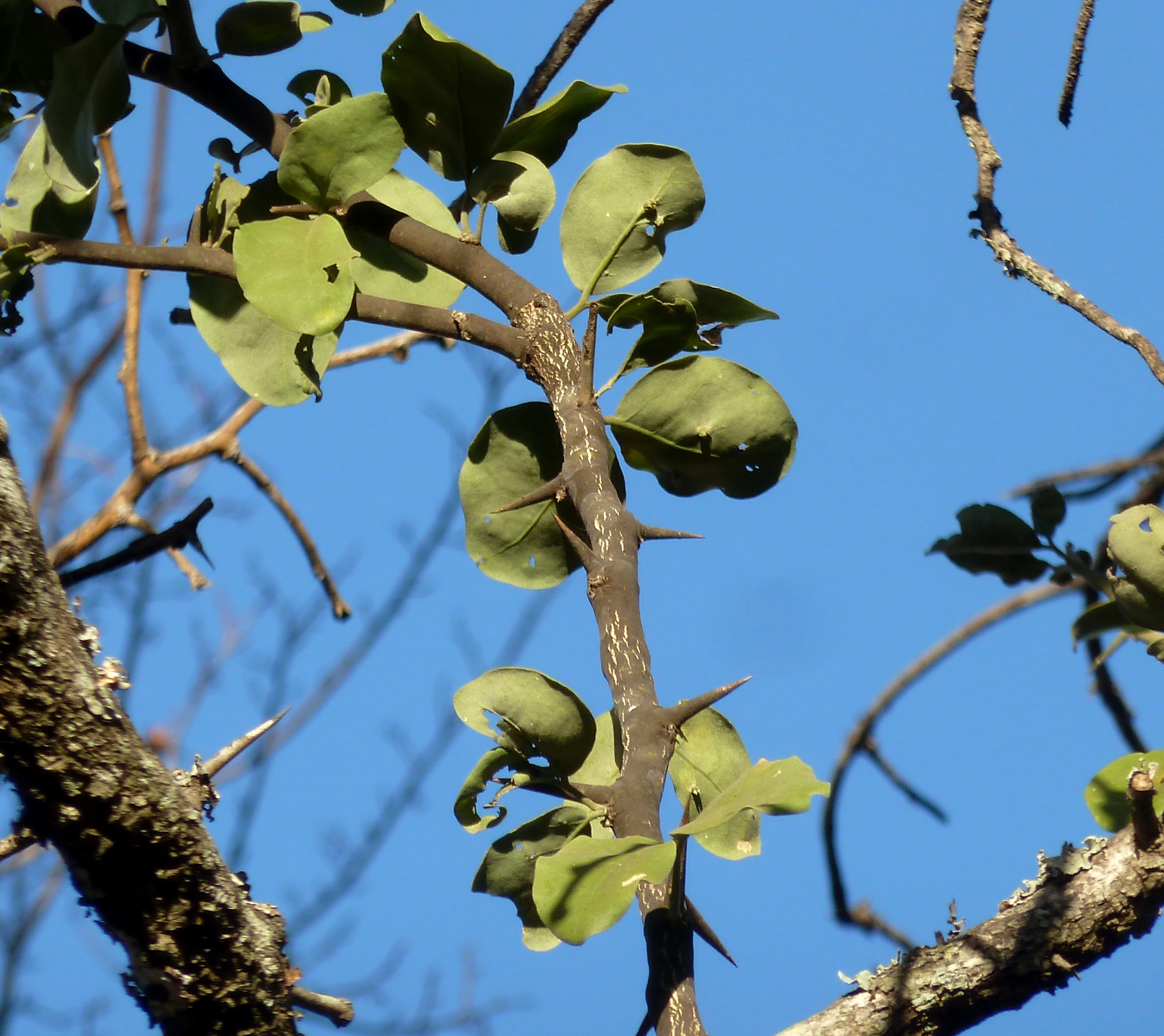
Twig with spikes and foliage
