= South African Class 33-400 =

Class of 115 South African diesel-electric locomotives

South African Class 33-400 TransNamib Class 33
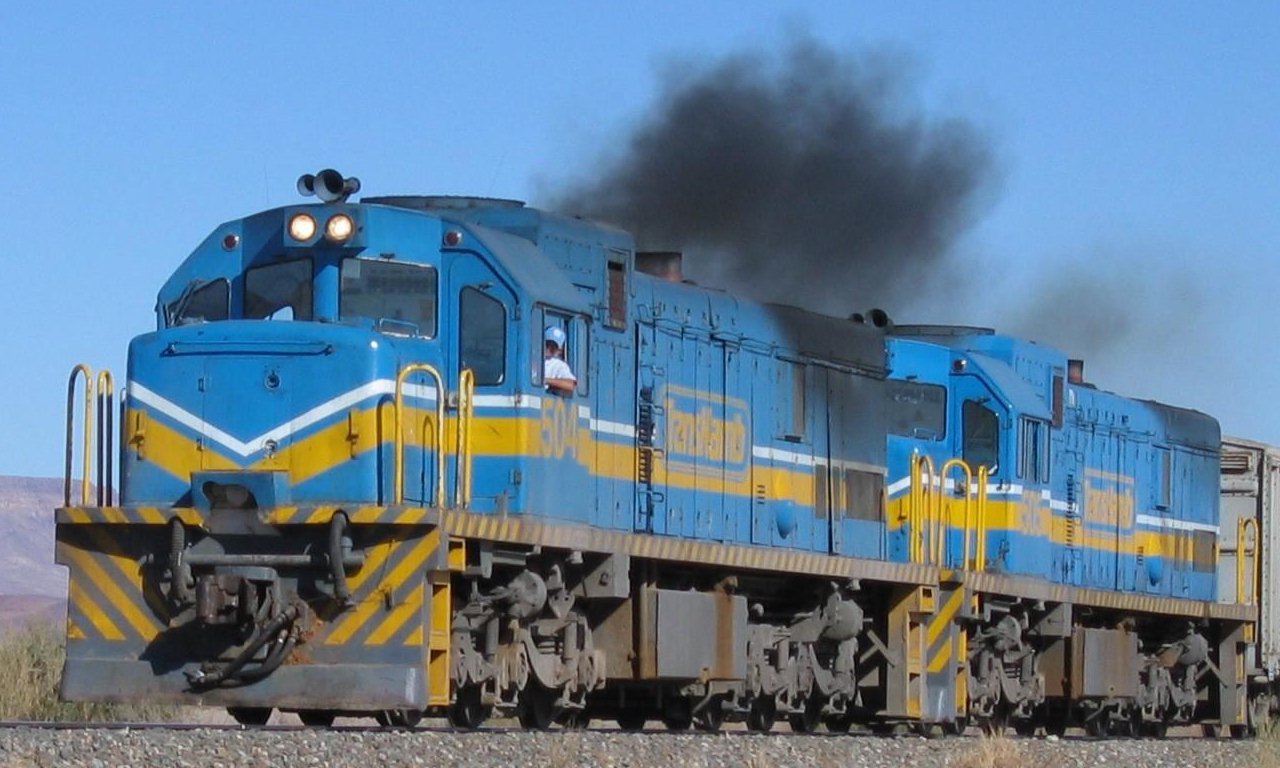
- Rebuilt TransNamib no. 504, ex no. 33-475, near Keetmanshoop, 2 September 2004
Type and origin
- Power type: Diesel-electric
- Designer: General Electric
- Builder: SA GE-DL Locomotive Group
- Serial number: 36530-36644
- Model: GE U20C
- Build date: 1968-1970
- Total produced: 115
Specifications
- Configuration
  - AAR: C-C
  - UIC: Co'Co'
  - Commonwealth: Co+Co
- Gauge: 3 ft 6 in (1,067 mm) Cape gauge
- Wheel diameter: 915 mm (36.0 in)
- Wheelbase: 12,243 mm (40 ft 2.0 in)
  - Axle spacing (Asymmetrical): 1-2: 1,594 mm (5 ft 2.8 in); 2-3: 1,911 mm (6 ft 3.2 in)
  - Bogie: 3,505 mm (11 ft 6.0 in)
- Pivot centres: 9,017 mm (29 ft 7.0 in)
- Length
  - Over couplers: 16,866 mm (55 ft 4.0 in)
- Width: 2,756 mm (9 ft 0.5 in)
- Height: 3,931 mm (12 ft 10.8 in)
- Axle load: 15,749 kg (34,721 lb)
- Adhesive weight: 94,494 kg (208,324 lb)
- Loco weight: 94,494 kg (208,324 lb) max
- Fuel type: Diesel
- Fuel capacity: 3,600 litres (790 imp gal)
- Prime mover: GE 7FDL-12
- RPM range: 400-1,000
  - RPM idle: 400
  - Maximum RPM: 1,000
- Engine type: 4 stroke diesel
- Aspiration: Elliott H-584 turbocharger
- Generator: DC 10 pole GE 5GT-581C9
- Traction motors: Six GE 5GE-761A6 DC 4 pole
  - Rating 1 hour: 635A
  - Continuous: 620A @ 20 km/h (12 mph)
- Cylinders: V12
- Gear ratio: 92:19
- MU working: 6 maximum
- Loco brake: 28L-AV-1 with vigilance control
- Train brakes: Westinghouse 6CDX4UC compressor/exhauster
- Air tank cap.: 825 litres (181 imp gal)
- Compressor: 0.029 m^{3}/s (1.0 cu ft/s)
- Exhauster: 0.116 m^{3}/s (4.1 cu ft/s)
- Couplers: AAR knuckle (SASKOP DS)
Performance figures
- Maximum speed: 100 km/h (62 mph)
- Power output
  - Starting: 1,605 kW (2,152 hp)
  - Continuous: 1,490 kW (2,000 hp)
- Tractive effort
  - Starting: 223 kN (50,000 lbf) @ 25% adhesion
  - Continuous: 178 kN (40,000 lbf) @ 24 km/h (15 mph)
- Factor of adh.
  - Starting: 25%
  - Continuous: 20%
- Brakeforce: 70% ratio @ 345 kPa (50.0 psi)
- Dynamic brake peak effort: 173 kN (39,000 lbf) @ 26 km/h (16 mph)
Career
- Operators: South African Railways; Spoornet; TransNamib; Transnet Freight Rail; Ferrovia Centro-Atlântica (Brazil); América Latina Logística (Brazil); Ferroviaria Oriental (Bolivia); Sociedad Química y Minera (Chile); Kumba Iron Ore; Sudan Railways; Zambia Railways
- Class: Class 33-400
- Number in class: 115
- Numbers: 33-401 to 33-515
- Nicknames: Bosvark
- Delivered: 1968-1970
- First run: 1968

The South African Railways Class 33-400 of 1968 was a South African and Namibian diesel-electric locomotive.

Between 1968 and 1970, the South African Railways placed 115 Class 33-400 General Electric type U20C diesel-electric locomotives in service. Many of them were transferred to TransNamib, the Namibian Railways, upon South West Africa’s independence on 21 March 1990.

== Manufacturer ==
The Class 33-400 type GE U20C diesel-electric locomotive was designed for the South African Railways (SAR) by General Electric (GE) and built by the South African General Electric-Dorman Long Locomotive Group (SA GE-DL, later Dorbyl). The 115 locomotives were delivered between July 1968 and March 1970, numbered in the range from 33-401 to 33-515.

== Class 33 series ==
The Class 33 consisted of three series, the GE Classes 33-000 and 33-400 and the General Motors Electro-Motive Division Class 33-200. Both manufacturers also produced locomotives for the subsequent SAR Classes 34, 35 and 36.

The two GE-built Classes were virtually identical in appearance, but could be distinguished from each other by some ventilation openings on their bodywork.

- The Class 33-000 had press-formed louvre openings in both short hood doors on the right hand side of the nose, while the Class 33-400 had no opening in either of these doors.
- Just to the rear of the cab on both sides of the long hood and more or less in line with the cab windows, both models had panels with three ventilation openings. These had two horizontal bars in each opening on the Class 33-000 and press-formed louvre openings on the Class 33-400.

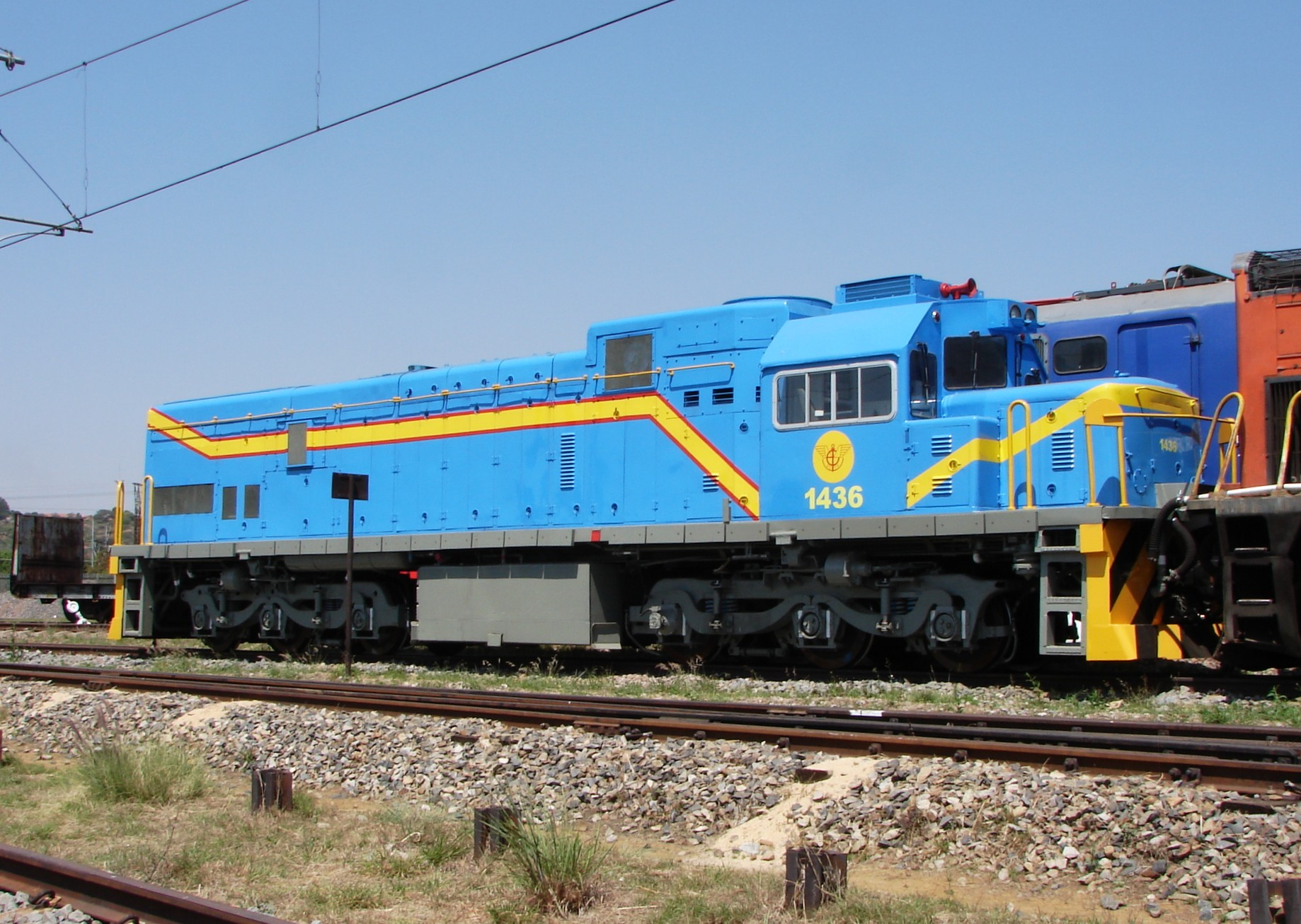
SCTP Class 33-000 no. 1436

These doors and panels could and sometimes did get swapped between models, either as replacement for damaged items or by chance during overhauls. An example is SCTP no. 1435, sold to the Congolese Company for Transportation and Ports (SCTP), illustrated below, of which the left-side door on the nose had apparently been swapped with that of their Class 33-000 no. 1436, illustrated alongside.

== Service ==
=== South African Railways ===
Upon being commissioned, many of the Class 33-400 locomotives were placed in service in South West Africa (SWA) while some went to the Mafeking line working out of Johannesburg. Forty-five of them were eventually transferred to TransNamib, the Namibian Railways, upon SWA’s independence on 21 March 1990. They retained their SAR engine numbers on the TransNamib roster, but without the "33-" prefix. Some have since been sold while others have been rebuilt with reconditioned prime movers by TransNamib's workshops in Windhoek and renumbered from no. 501 up.

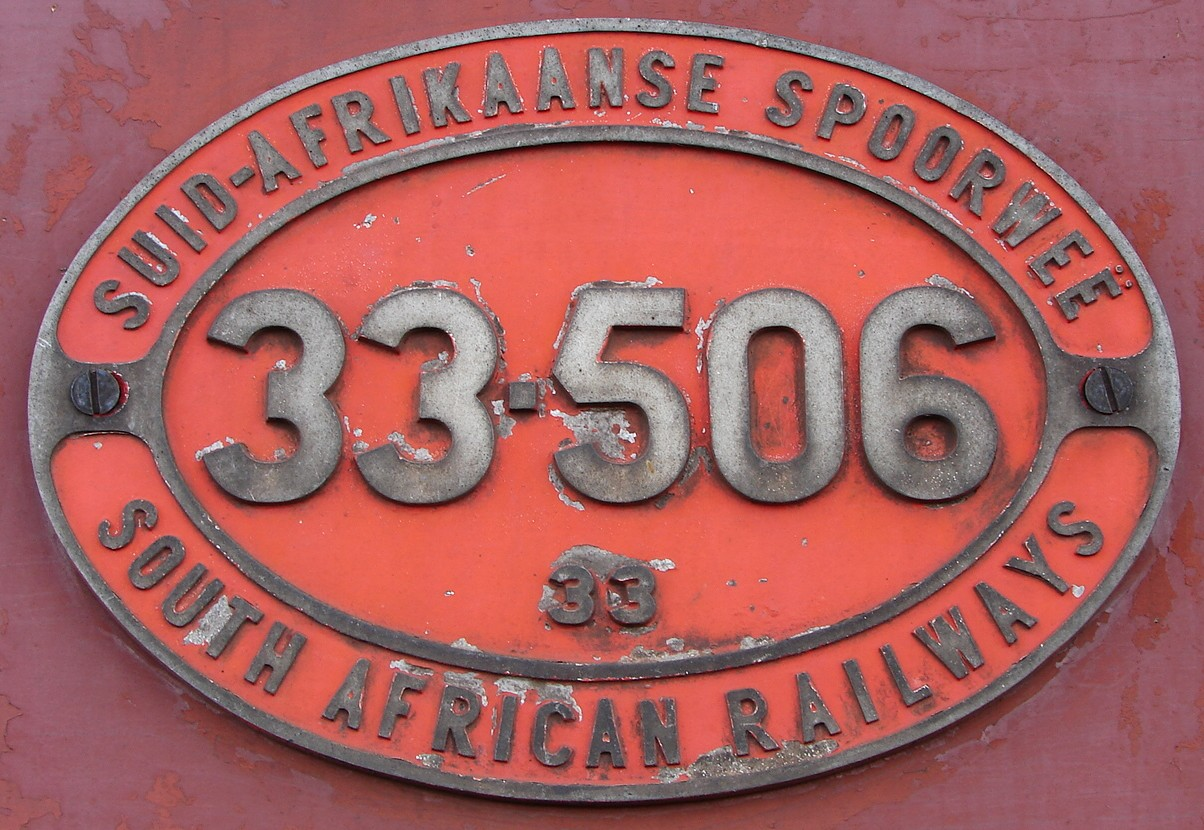

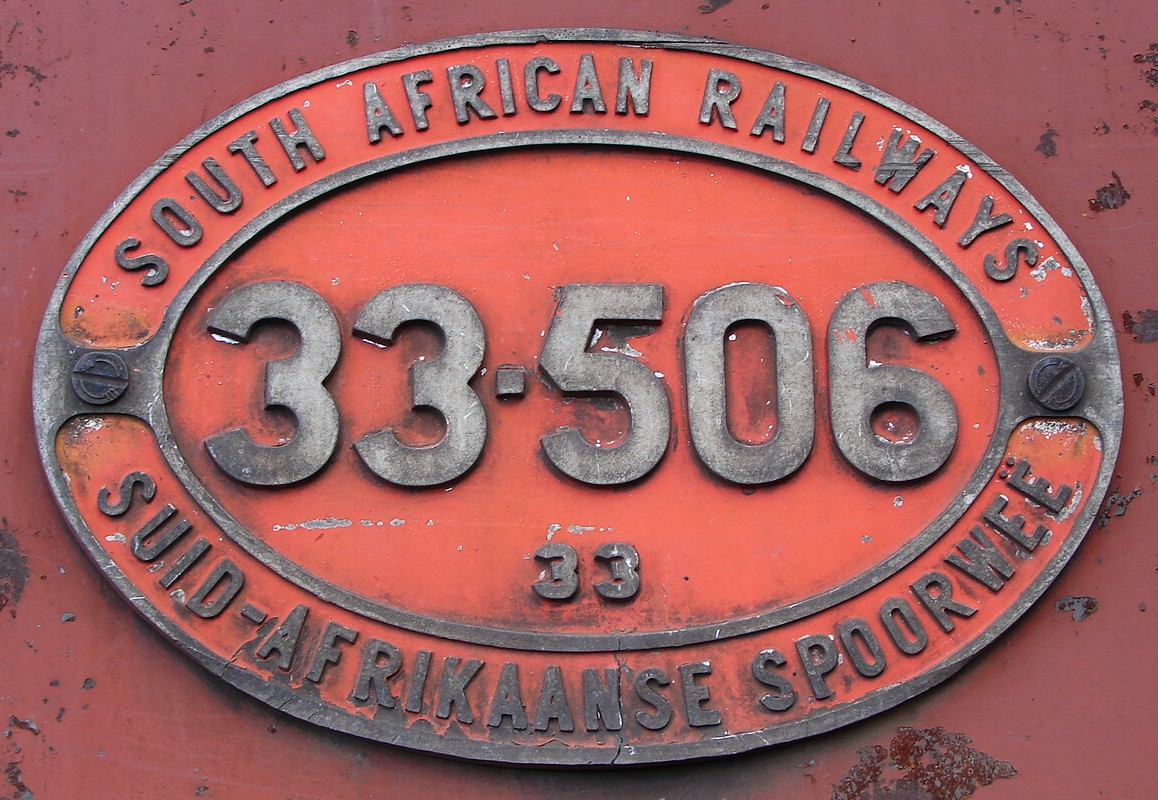

The two cabside number plates on Class 33-400 locomotives were not identical. Usually, all the locomotives in a Class would have either Afrikaans or English at the top of all their number plates. On the Class 33-400's number plates, the inscription was in Afrikaans at the top on the right hand or driver’s side, and in English at the top on the left hand or driver's assistant's side.

In South Africa, most of the Class 33-400 locomotives survived in mainline and branch line service well into the 21st century, for example on the lines from De Aar to Upington, from Worcester to Voorbaai and on suburban service out of East London. From 2009, some were also employed out of Cape Town on the Overberg line across Sir Lowry's Pass to Caledon and on the Bitterfontein line up the West Coast where they replaced several Classes 35-000 and 35-400 locomotives that were leased to private railway operators in several Southern African countries.

Some were employed for a while as heavy shunting engines to assemble or unload iron ore trains at the Sishen-Saldanha iron ore line's terminals until the arrival of the Class 43-000 in 2011 made more Classes 34-000, 34-400, 34-500 and 34-900 locomotives available for this task.

=== Zambia ===
Between October 1978 and May 1993, Zambia Railways (ZR) hired locomotives to solve its chronic shortages in motive power, mainly from South Africa but at times also from Zaire, Zimbabwe, the TAZARA Railway and even the Zambian Copper Mines. In Zambia, the South African locomotives were mainly used on goods trains between Livingstone and Kitwe, sometimes in tandem with a ZR locomotive and occasionally also on passenger trains.

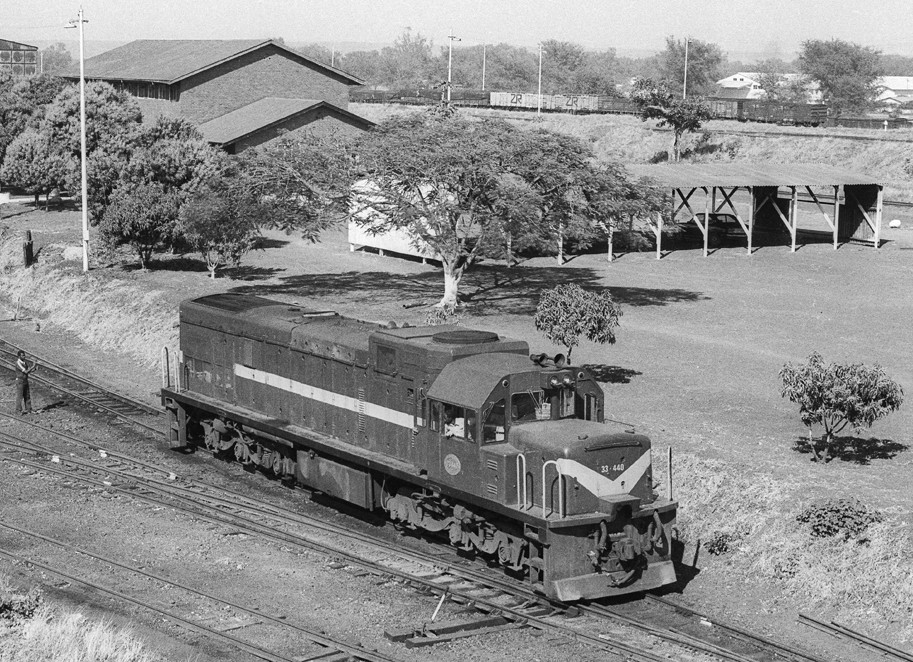
No. 33-440 on Livingstone Shed in Zambia

Locomotives were selected from a pool of engines which was allocated by the Railways for hire to Zambia. The South African fleet in Zambia was never constant since locomotives were continually exchanged as they became due back in South Africa for their three-monthly services. The locomotives were initially selected from the Classes 33-400, 35-000 and 35-200, but by December 1989 some Class 33-000 locomotives also began to serve one or more tours of duty in Zambia.

The pool of Class 33-400 locomotives allocated by the Railways for hire to ZR from time to time included the locomotives as shown in the "Leased to" column in the table. The last Class 33-400 locomotive to serve in Zambia was no. 33-491 which was returned in April 1992. By the end of May 1993, no more South African locomotives were working in Zambia.

=== South America ===
In 1997, twenty Class 33-400 locomotives were sold to Ferrovia Centro-Atlântica (FCA). They were since resold in 1999 to América Latina Logística (ALL) in Brazil where they retained their FCA engine numbers.

In 2003, three of these locomotives, ex SAR numbers 33-410 (ALL 2663), 33-452 (2668) and 33-481 (2679), were resold to the Ferroviaria Oriental (FOB) in Bolivia. Of these, two were resold again to Sociedad Química y Minera (SQM) in Chile.

Of these twenty locomotives in South America, ten still survived by July 2010. These include the three units sold to FOB and subsequently resold to EFO and SQM, five locomotives reported as non-operating and two which were returned to Rede Ferroviária Federal, Sociedade Anônima (RFFSA), the state-owned federal railroad network of Brazil.

=== Sudan Railways ===
Ten Class 33-400 locomotives were sold to the Sudan Railways.

=== Democratic Republic of the Congo ===
In 2015, some Class 33-000 and Class 33-400 locomotives were sold to the Congolese Company for Transportation and Ports (SCTP, formerly Onatra) in the Democratic Republic of the Congo. These locomotives were refurbished in South Africa prior to being delivered to their new owners.

=== Industrial service ===
Six Class 33-400 locomotives were sold to Iscor (now Kumba Iron Ore) for use at its Vanderbijlpark steel works and at Kumba’s Grootgeluk Colliery at Ellisras.

== Preservation ==
One loco Class 33-400 no. 33-487 has been marked down on TRANSnet Heritage Foundation as a historic locomotive set to be preserved in the near future it currently resides at East London - Cambridge.

== Liveries ==
The class 33-400 were all delivered in the Gulf Red livery with yellow side-stripes on the long hood, a yellow V on each end, signal red buffer beams and unpainted steel cowcatchers. Most of them wore this livery throughout their SAR service life. In the Spoornet era at least one was painted in Spoornet orange livery with yellow and blue chevron buffer beams and in the Transnet Freight Rail era at least one was painted in its red, green and yellow livery.

== Works numbers ==
The Class 33-400 builder’s works numbers and eventual disposition are listed in the table.

Class 33-400, type GE U20C
SAR no.	Works no.	Leased to	Post-SAR owner	Post-SAR no.	Rebuilt, or Resold to:	Rebuilt or Resold no.
33-401	36530		FCA & ALL	2670		
33-402	36531		TransNamib	402		
33-403	36532	Zambia	Sudan			
33-404	36533		Sudan			
33-405	36534		TransNamib	405		
33-406	36535	Zambia	Sudan			
33-407	36536	Zambia	TransNamib	407	TransNamib	508
33-408	36537		Sudan			
33-409	36538		Sudan			
33-410	36539		FCA & ALL	2663	FOB (EFO)	2009
33-411	36540		Sudan			
33-412	36541		TransNamib	412		
33-413	36542		TransNamib	413		
33-414	36543		TransNamib	414	TransNamib	503
33-415	36544		Sudan			
33-416	36545		TransNamib	416		
33-417	36546		TransNamib	417		
33-418	36547					
33-419	36548		TransNamib	419	TransNamib	507
33-420	36549					
33-421	36550	Zambia	FCA & ALL	2661		
33-422	36551	Zambia	TransNamib	422	TransNamib	505
33-423	36552	Zambia	FCA & ALL	2680		
33-424	36553		Sudan			
33-425	36554	Zambia	TransNamib	425	TransNamib	509
33-426	36555					
33-427	36556	Zambia	TransNamib	427		
33-428	36557		FCA & ALL	2666		
33-429	36558	Zambia	FCA & ALL	2665		
33-430	36559		TransNamib	430		
33-431	36560		TransNamib	431		
33-432	36561		TransNamib	432		
33-433	36562		FCA & ALL	2672		
33-434	36563		TransNamib	434	TransNamib	502
33-435	36564		TransNamib	435		
33-436	36565		Kumba E	7		
33-437	36566	Zambia	TransNamib	437		
33-438	36567		FCA & ALL	2669		
33-439	36568	Zambia	FCA & ALL	2677		
33-440	36569	Zambia	Sudan			
33-441	36570	Zambia	TransNamib	441		
33-442	36571	Zambia	TransNamib	442		
33-443	36572	Zambia	TransNamib	443		
33-444	36573		TransNamib	444		
33-445	36574	Zambia	TransNamib	445		
33-446	36575	Zambia	TransNamib	446		
33-447	36576		TransNamib	447		
33-448	36577		FCA & ALL	2664		
33-449	36578	Zambia	FCA & ALL	2678		
33-450	36579		Sudan			
33-451	36580		FCA & ALL	2671		
33-452	36581		FCA & ALL	2668	FOB & SQM	4 or 5
33-453	36582		TransNamib	453	TransNamib	501
33-454	36583		Kumba V	67		
33-455	36584	Zambia	TransNamib	455	TransNamib	506
33-456	36585		Kumba E	4		
33-457	36586	Zambia	TransNamib	457		
33-458	36587		FCA & ALL	2675		
33-459	36588		TransNamib	459		
33-460	36589	Zambia	TransNamib	460		
33-461	36590		Kumba V	68		
33-462	36591		Kumba V	69		
33-463	36592	Zambia	TransNamib	463		
33-464	36593		TransNamib	464		
33-465	36594		TransNamib	465		
33-466	36595		FCA & ALL	2676		
33-467	36596					
33-468	36597		TransNamib	468		
33-469	36598		FCA & ALL	2674		
33-470	36599		TransNamib	470		
33-471	36600		Kumba E	5		
33-472	36601		TransNamib	472		
33-473	36602		TransNamib	473		
33-474	36603		TransNamib	474		
33-475	36604		TransNamib	475	TransNamib	504
33-476	36605		TransNamib	476		
33-477	36606		FCA & ALL	2673		
33-478	36607		TransNamib	478	TransNamib	511
33-479	36608		TransNamib	479		
33-480	36609		TransNamib	480		
33-481	36610		FCA & ALL	2679	FOB & SQM	4 or 5
33-482	36611		FCA & ALL	2662		
33-483	36612		TransNamib	483		
33-484	36613		TransNamib	484	TransNamib	510
33-485	36614		FCA & ALL	2667		
33-486	36615	Zambia			TransNamib	486
33-487	36616	Zambia				
33-488	36617	Zambia				
33-489	36618	Zambia			TransNamib	489
33-490	36619	Zambia				
33-491	36620	Zambia				
33-492	36621	Zambia				
33-493	36622	Zambia			TransNamib	493
33-494	36623	Zambia			TransNamib	494
33-495	36624	Zambia				
33-496	36625	Zambia				
33-497	36626	Zambia				
33-498	36627	Zambia				
33-499	36628	Zambia				
33-500	36629	Zambia				
33-501	36630	Zambia				
33-502	36631	Zambia				
33-503	36632	Zambia				
33-504	36633	Zambia				
33-505	36634	Zambia				
33-506	36635	Zambia				
33-507	36636	Zambia				
33-508	36637	Zambia				
33-509	36638	Zambia				
33-510	36639	Zambia			TransNamib	
33-511	36640	Zambia				
33-512	36641	Zambia				
33-513	36642	Zambia				
33-514	36643	Zambia				
33-515	36644	Zambia				

== Illustration ==
The main picture and the following serve to illustrate the distinguishing features of the Class and some of the liveries that they served in.

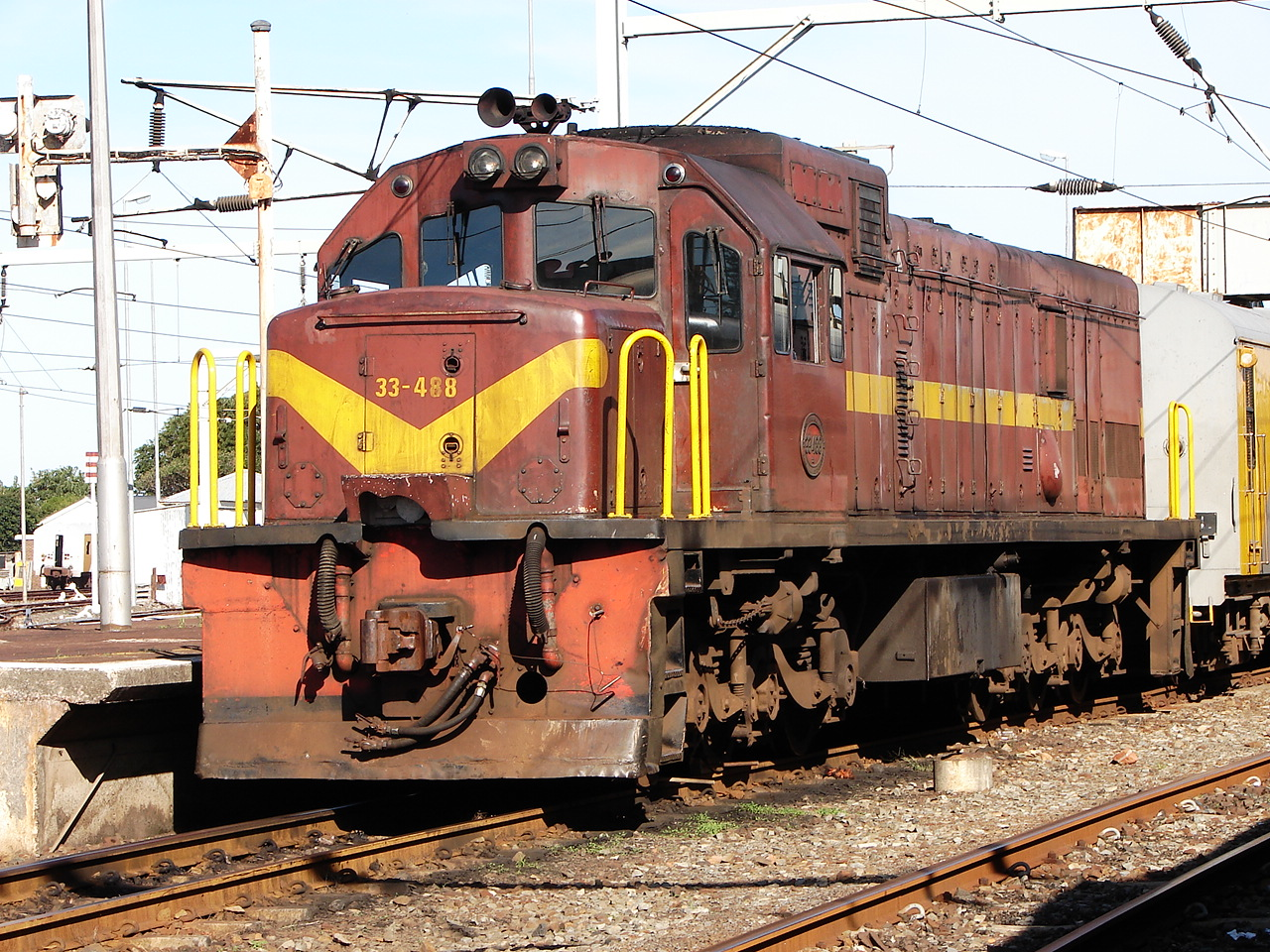
No. 33-488 in SAR Gulf Red and whiskers livery at East London, 24 April 2013

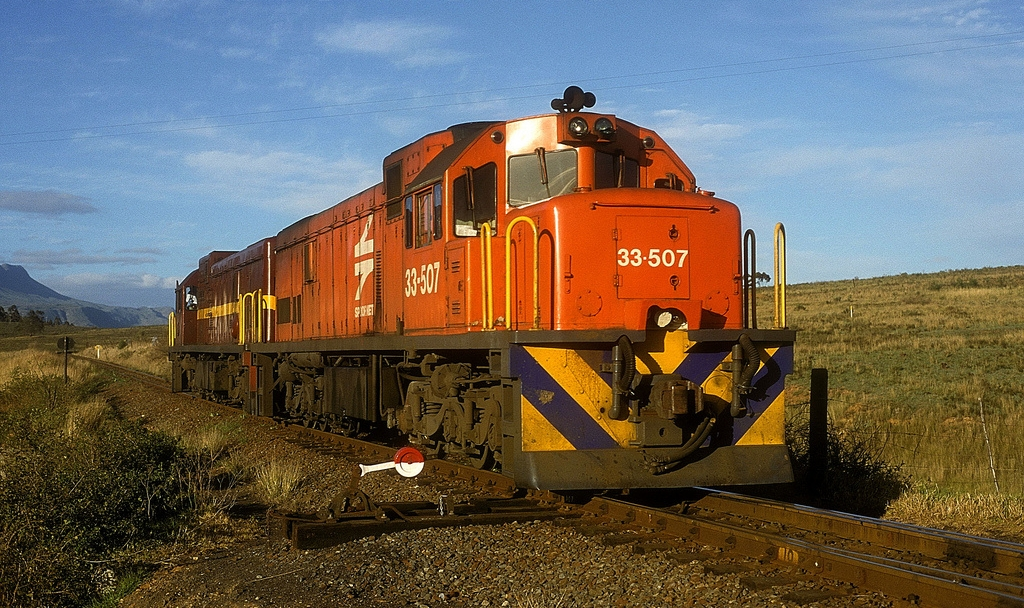
No. 33-507, the only known locomotive of the Class in Spoornet orange livery, at Swellendam, 20 August 2001

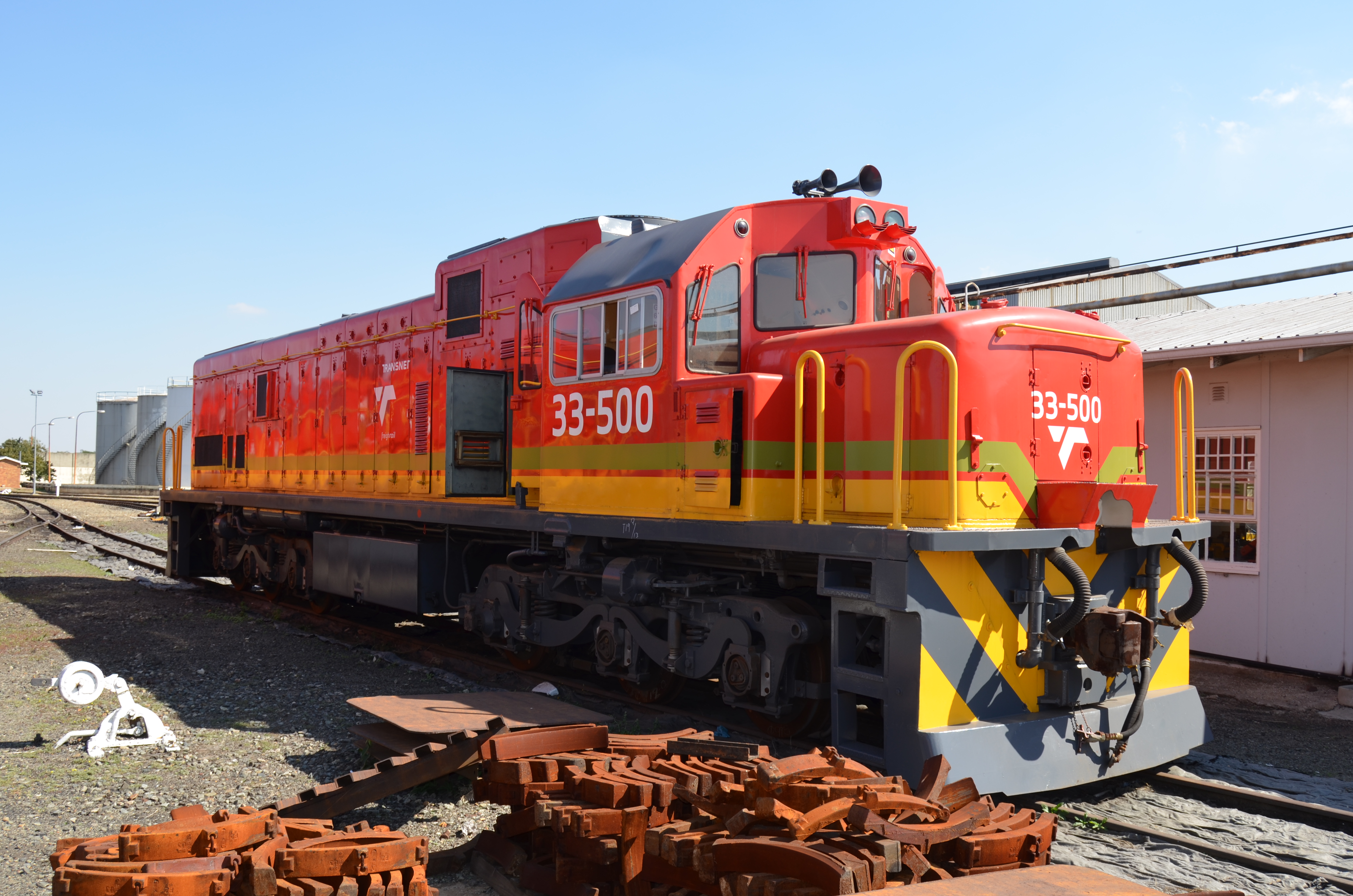
No. 33-500 in Transnet Freight Rail livery at Germiston diesel depot, Gauteng, 1 May 2013

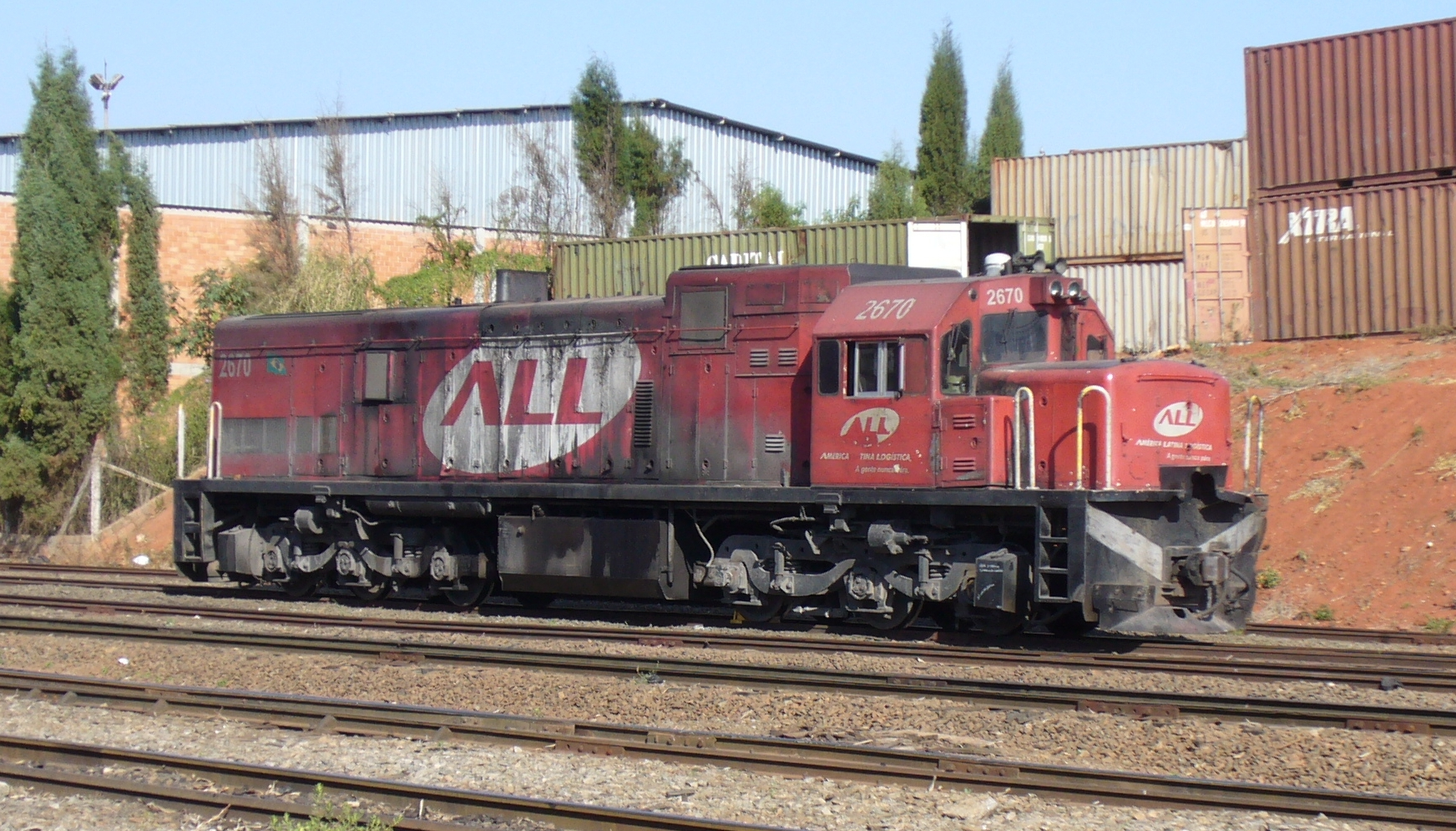
ALL no. 2670, ex SAR no. 33-401, in América Latina Logística livery at Tatuí, São Paulo, Brazil, 29 September 2011

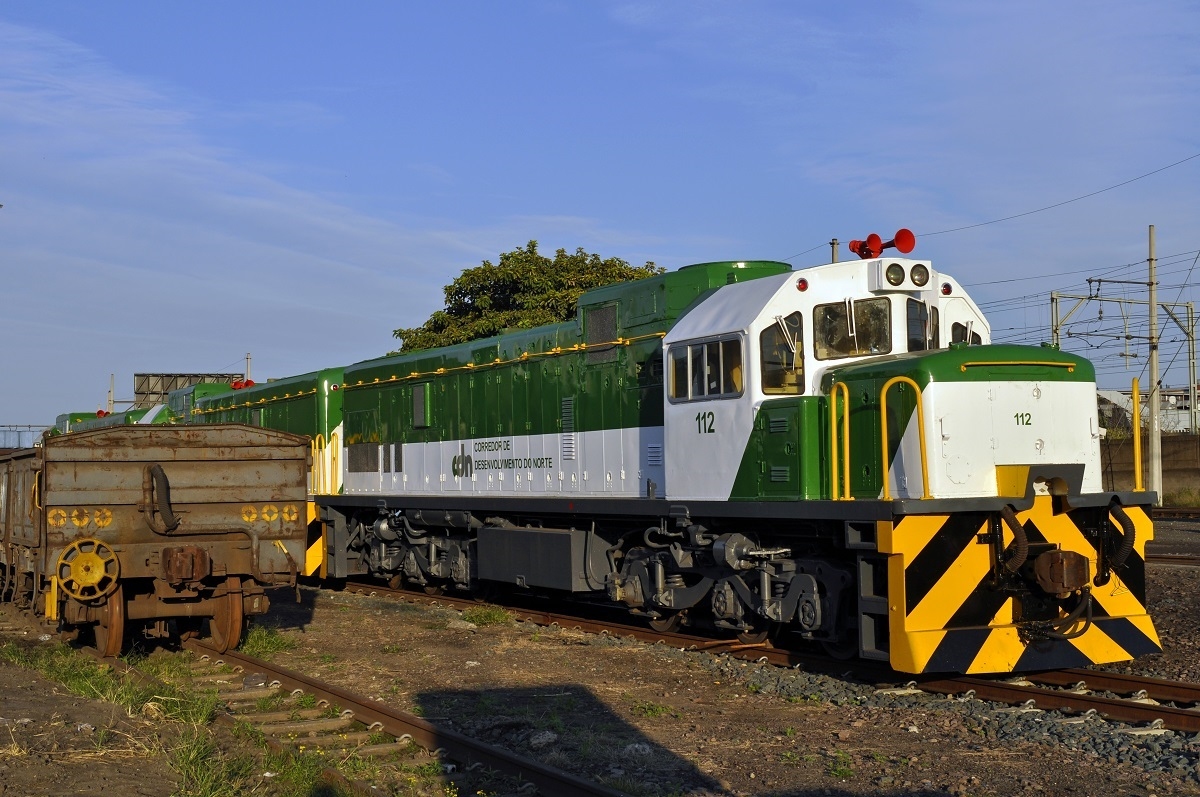
Class 33-400 no. 112, sold to the Corredor de Desenvolvimento do Norte of Nacala, Mozambique, 1 June 2013

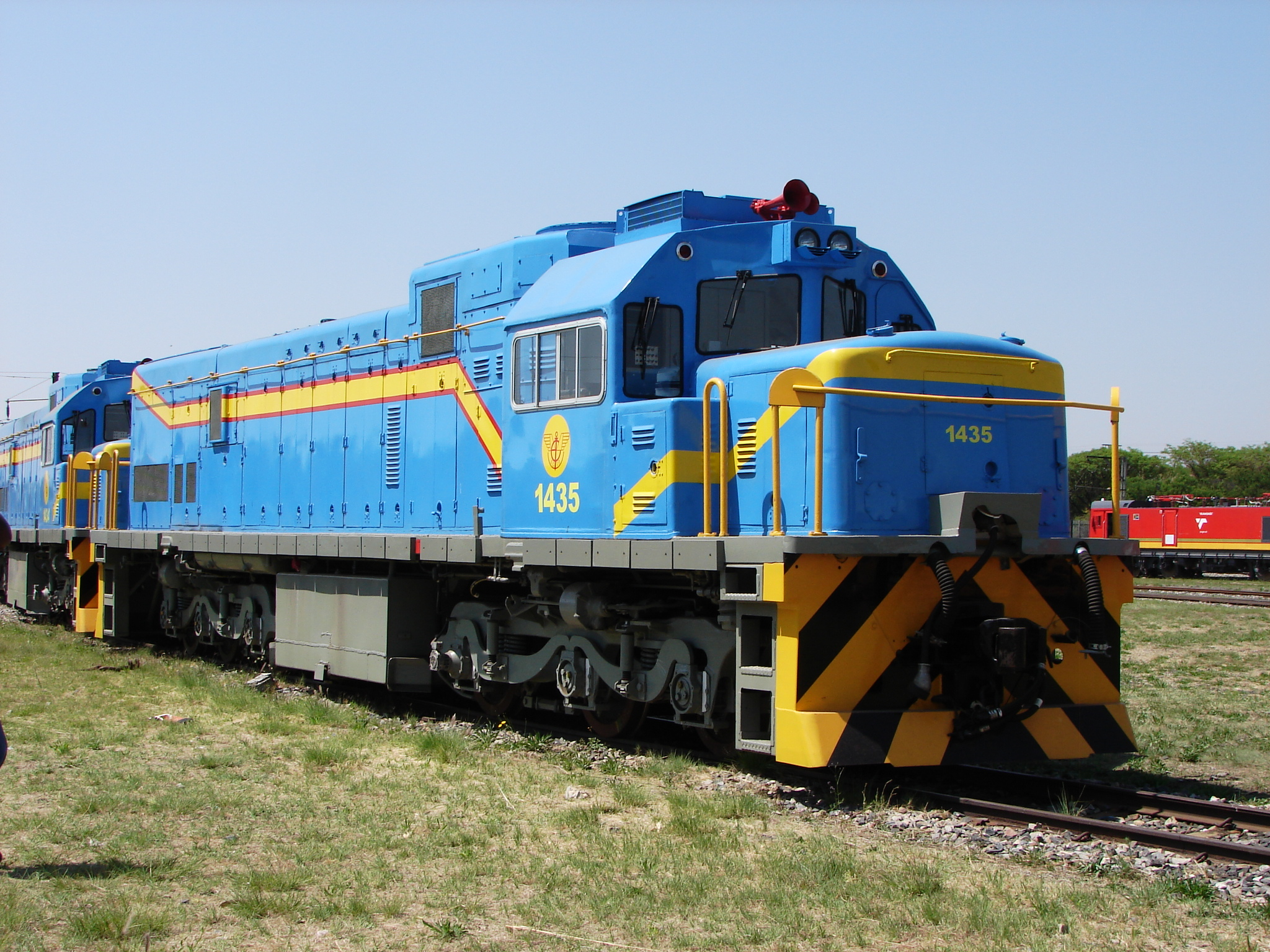
Class 33-400 no. 1435, sold to the Congolese SCTP, at Koedoespoort, 29 September 2015
