= Mukurob =

Rock formation in Namibia

Coordinates: 25°29′51.09″S 018°10′16.35″E

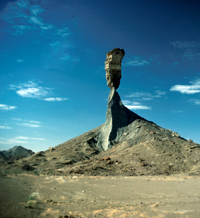
The "Finger of God" before its collapse

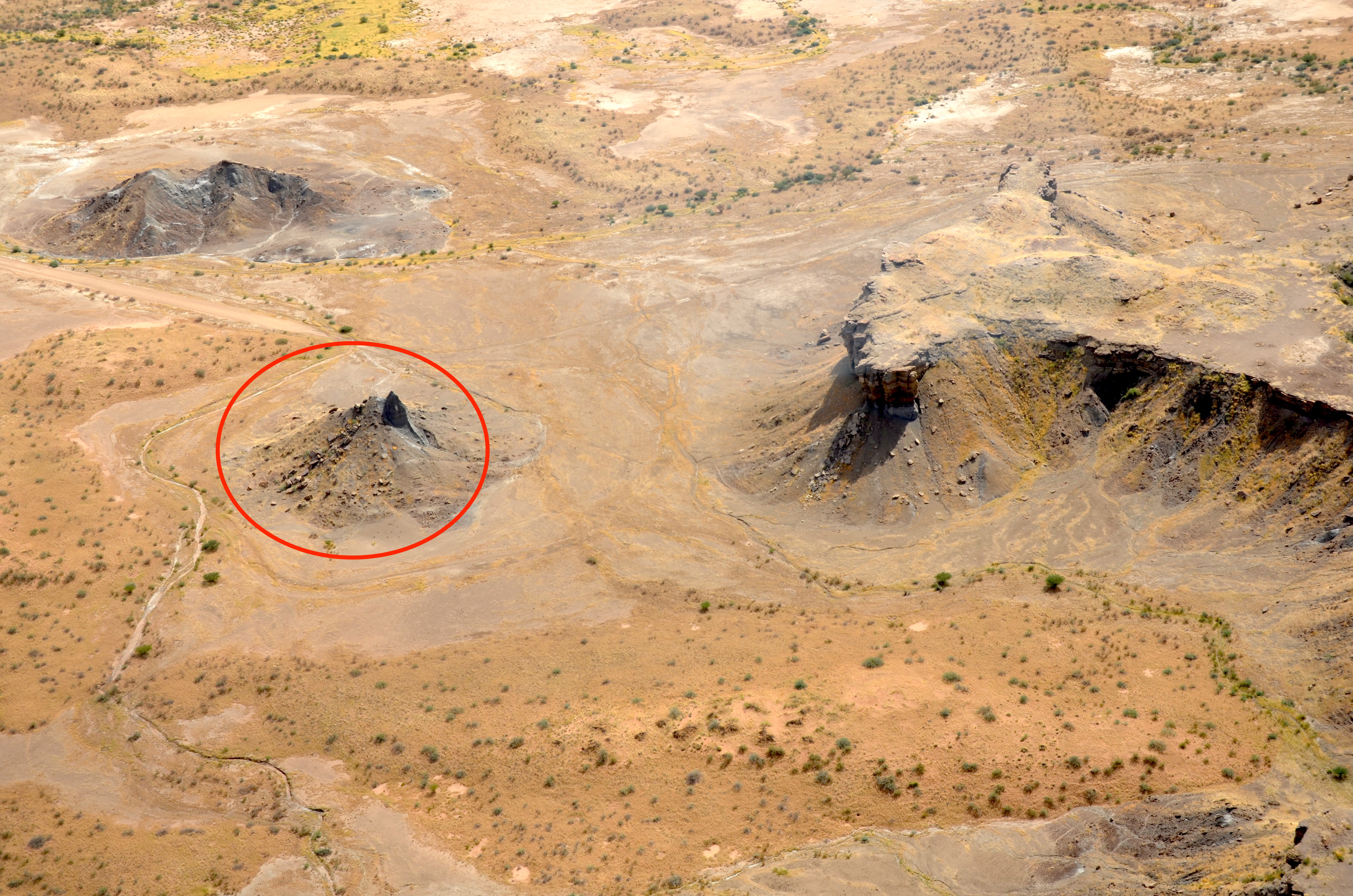
Aerial view of Mukurob after its collapse

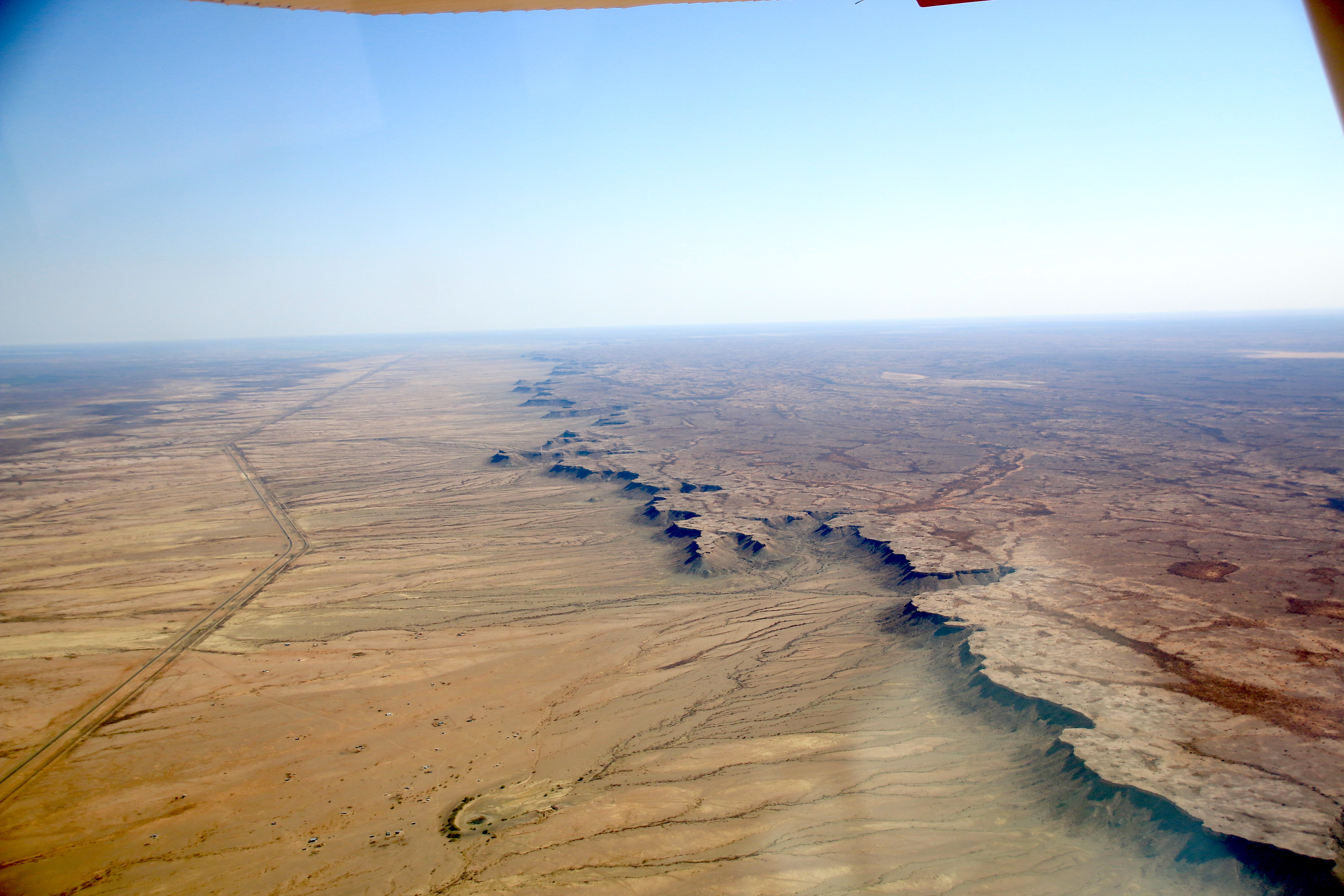
Aerial view of Weissrand (2019)

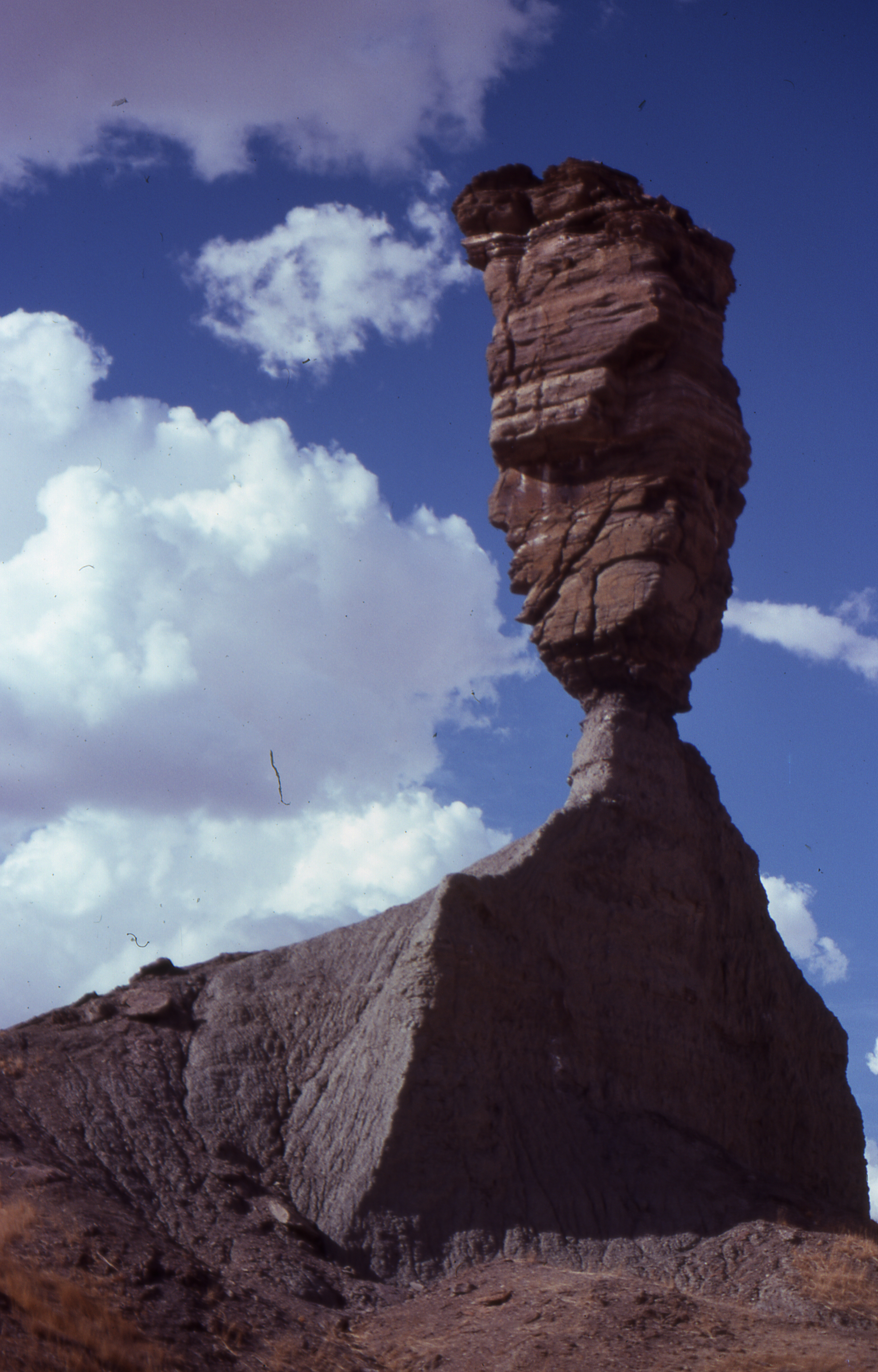
Mukurob 1976

The Mukurob, also Vingerklip in Afrikaans or "Finger of God" near Asab in Namibia, was a sandstone rock formation in the Namib desert which collapsed on 7 December 1988.

== Geology ==
Mukurob consisted mostly of sandstone. The structure was 12 m high and up to 4.5 m wide, and weighed some 450 tons. What made Mukorob so special, however, was its base. Just 3 m long and 1.5 m wide, it was much narrower than the mass of rock which it supported.

Mukurob was once part of the Weissrand Plateau before 50,000 years of erosion slowly isolated the structure from the rest of the plateau.

== History ==
=== Early history ===
Mukurob was known to the Nama people for generations and inspired many tales and legends. The legend that follows explains the structure's name and was told in many versions:
"The Herero people had been at odds with the Nama people since time immemorial. One day a large group of Herero and their well-fed cattle came from the grazing areas in central Namibia to the Nama region in the arid south. “Look here, how rich we are, with our nice fat cattle”, they boasted. “And what have you got? Nothing but rocks!” they mocked. The quick-witted Nama, however, replied: “We have this very special rock. You may own as many heads of cattle as you want – we are the lords of the country as long as this rock stands here.” This annoyed the Herero and they decided to topple the rock. They tied many thongs into a long rope, wound it around the rock and hitched up their cattle. But hard as they tried, they were not able to topple the rock. "Mû kho ro!" the Nama shouted – “There you see"!

Nama oral tradition also related that the power of the white man would end when this geological structure collapsed. South Africa finally relinquished control of (then) South West Africa a few weeks after Mukurob collapsed on the night of 7 December 1988, when South Africa, Angola and Cuba signed the "New York Treaty" (or "Tripartite Agreement") at UN Headquarters, which finalised the agreements reached earlier in Geneva. Angola and Cuba also signed a bilateral agreement on the Cuban troop withdrawal from Angola, which paved the way for Security Council Resolution 435 to be implemented on 1 April 1989. On 21 March 1990, Namibia gained independence from South Africa.

=== Recent history ===
Before it collapsed in 1988, Mukurob was one of the greatest tourist attractions in Namibia, attracting viewers from all over the world, and prompted several geological studies of the structure. Mukurob was given "National Monument" status (Category: Geology) on 1 June 1955. Its status was not revoked after the structure's collapse.

=== Collapse ===
It is still not known what truly caused Mukurob's collapse on the night of 7 December 1988. It is believed that a rainstorm the week before may have weakened the sandstone pillar and contributed to its demise. Another study showed that the 1988 Spitak earthquake in Armenia registered heavily in Namibia on the night that Mukurob collapsed.

The collapsed rock was discovered the next morning by a farmer and his three sons.
