= Asab =

- Settlement
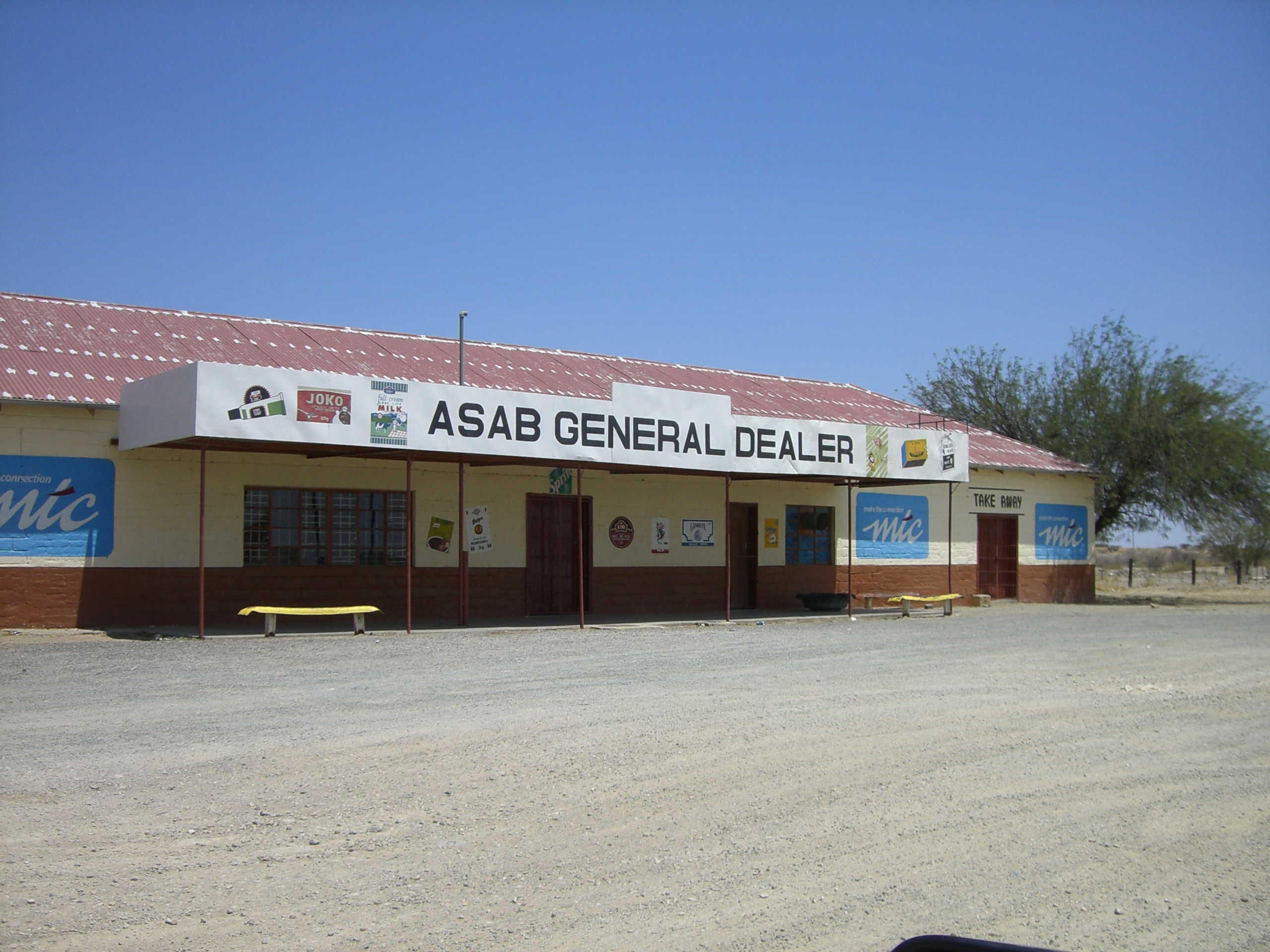
- The General dealer in Asab

- Location in Namibia
- Coordinates: 25°49′S 18°00′E
- Country: Namibia
- Region: Hardap Region
- Constituency: Berseba Constituency
- Time zone: UTC+2 (South African Standard Time)

Asab (Nama: new (male)) is a settlement in the Hardap Region of southern Namibia. It is situated on the B1 national road about halfway between Mariental and Keetmanshoop. 23 km (14 mi) east of Asab is the Mukurob rock pinnacle, a tourist attraction that collapsed on 7 December 1988.

Asab belongs to the Berseba electoral constituency. The settlement features a petrol station, a shop, and a small hotel, although none of these businesses is currently operational, to the effect that the place has been described as a "ghost village". Asab Railway Station is a stop on the TransNamib railway line from Windhoek to Keetmanshoop.

3 kilometres (1.9 mi) outside Asab there is the community of Gründoring (literally German: Green Thorn, referring to the Torchwood of the Balanites genus), with a privately built church and a now-defunct pre-primary school.
