= TransNamib =

Railway operator in Namibia

TransNamib Holdings Limited
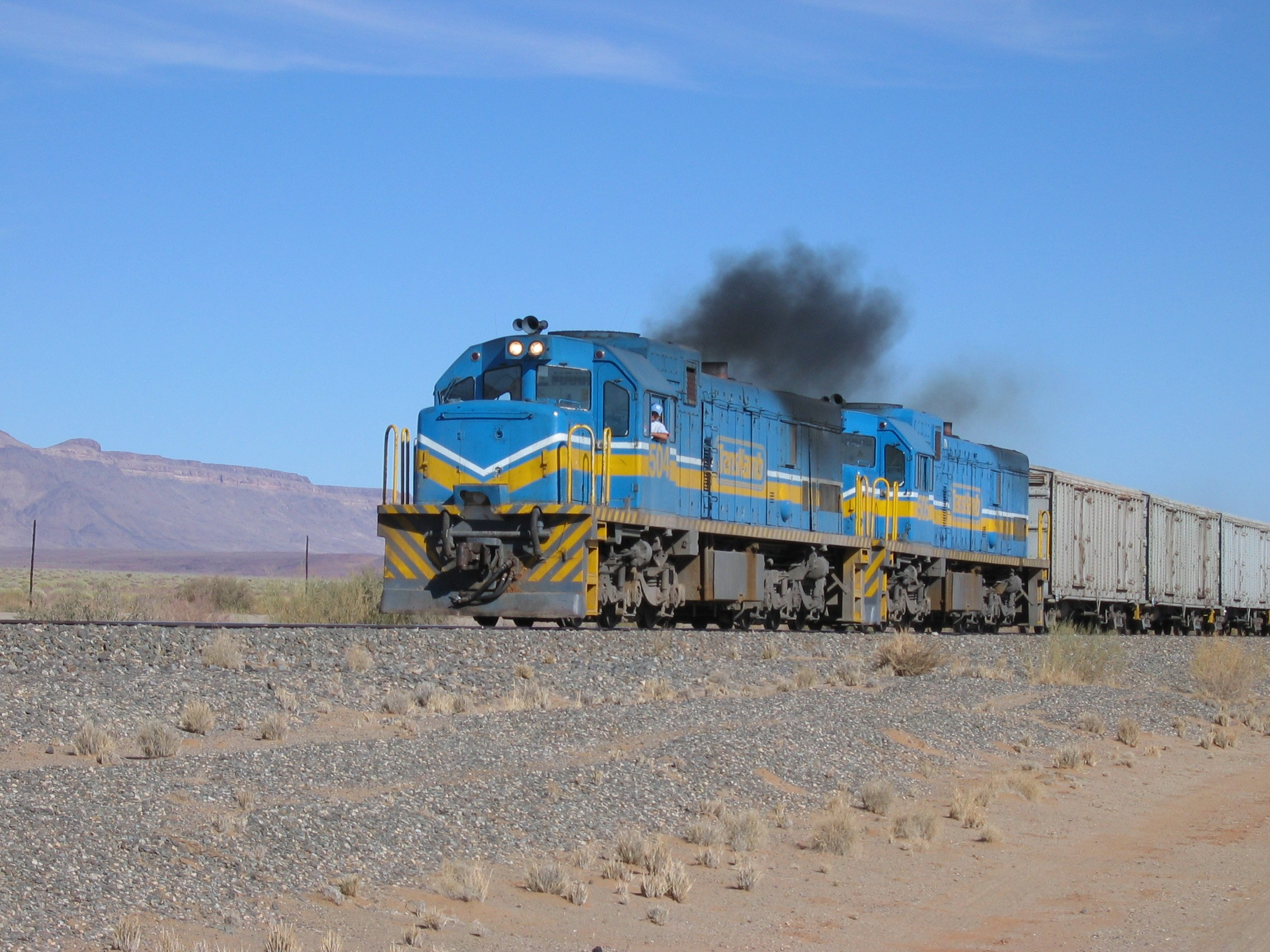
- Two TransNamib U20C (South African Class 33-400) diesel-electric locomotives haul a train south of Keetmanshoop

TransNamib Holdings Limited (TransNamib) is a state-owned railway company in Namibia. Organised as a holding company, it provides both rail and road freight services, as well as passenger rail services. Its headquarters are in the country’s capital Windhoek.

== History ==
A first local railway was constructed in 1895 by the Damaraland Guano Company for commercial purposes. The first public railway, and the core of the present system, was constructed by the German colonial government. The 383 km connection between Swakopmund and Windhoek was inaugurated on June 19, 1902. The German colonial railway was taken over by the Railways of South Africa after World War I, and linked into the network of South Africa. After the independence of Namibia, TransNamib took control of the national rail network.

== Operations ==
TransNamib operated 2,883 km of rail in 1995. Since then, further track has been added to the network through the Northern Extension. It operates on 1,067 mm (3 ft 6 in) Cape gauge. While focus has been primarily on freight services, passenger services are an important component of TransNamib and provided under the Starline logo. The “Desert Express” was a tourist train that ceased operations in 2020.

In early 2011, the Karasburg - Ariamsvlei mainline was damaged by flash floods, as was part of the Seeheim-Lüderitz line; services were suspended.

== Major lines and stations ==
Map of the rail network of Namibia

- Windhoek-Tsumeb/Walvis Bay
  - Windhoek Railway Station
  - Okahandja
  - Karibib
    - Swakopmund
    - Walvis Bay
  - Omaruru
  - Otjiwarongo
  - Tsumeb
- Northern Extension (currently unused)
  - Tsumeb
  - Ondangwa (completed 2006)
  - Oshikango (inaugurated 2012, future link to Angola proposed)
- Winhoek-Gobabis
  - Windhoek
  - Neudamm
  - Omitara
  - Gobabis
- Windhoek-Upington
  - Windhoek
  - Rehoboth
  - Mariental
    - Maltahöhe
  - Gibeon
  - Asab
  - Tses
  - Keetmanshoop
  - Seeheim
    - Lüderitz
  - Karasburg
  - Upington, South Africa

== See also ==
- Rail transport in Namibia
- Transport in Namibia
- South African Class 32-200
- South African Class 33-400
- Otavi Mining and Railway Company
