= Juliet Kavetuna =

Namibian politician

- Born: September 21, 1974 (age 51); Otjiwarongo
- Occupations: Legislator and registered nurse
- Title: Honorable
- Political party: Swapo Party of Namibia
- Website: parliament.na

Juliet Kavetuna (born 21 August 1974 at Otjiwarongo in Otjozondjupa Region) is a Namibian politician and a legislator serving since 2008 in National Assembly. She is a former deputy minister of Health and Social Services, a former minister of Youth, National Service, Sport and Culture and a former secretary general of the National Youth Council of Namibia

== Early life and education ==
Kavetuna started her early education in the 80s at Spes Bona Primary School from 1980 to1987. In 1991–1994 she matriculated at Okakarara Senior Secondary School. Kavetuna is a holder of the following qualifications; diploma in Comprehensive Nursing Science, postgraduate diploma specialising in gender and development studies as well as a master's degree in gender.

== Early career ==
At the early stage of her career from 1994 to 1995 Kavetuna worked as receptionist at Cash Trader Wholesalers. In 1996 to 2001 she was appointed to serve as regional development planner for the food for work program. Kavetuna started her nursing profession as a registered nurse at the Roman Catholic Hospital in 2005, in the same year she was also appointed as a head of community development at the Otjiwarongo Municipality. As from 2006 t0 2008 she became a secretary general of the National Youth Council of Namibia.

== Political career ==
In April 2008 Kavetuna make her first entry to parliament to replace then minister John Alphons Pandeni of the Regional, Local Government and Housing and Rural Development after his sudden death. Kavetuna was at position 65 on the list of the Swapo Party's parliamentary list that made her an immediate replacer.

In 2012 during the previous administration of president Hifikepunye Pohamba reshuffle, Kavetuna was appointed as deputy minister of Youth National Service, Sport and Culture until in 2015. In the current administration of President Hage Geingob, as from March 2015 to February 2020 Kavetuna was appointed to serve as a deputy minister of Health and Social Service. After the cabinet reshuffle in 2020, Kavetuna became an ordinary member of the National Assembly as one of the Swapo Party backbencher.
