= Agriculture in Namibia =

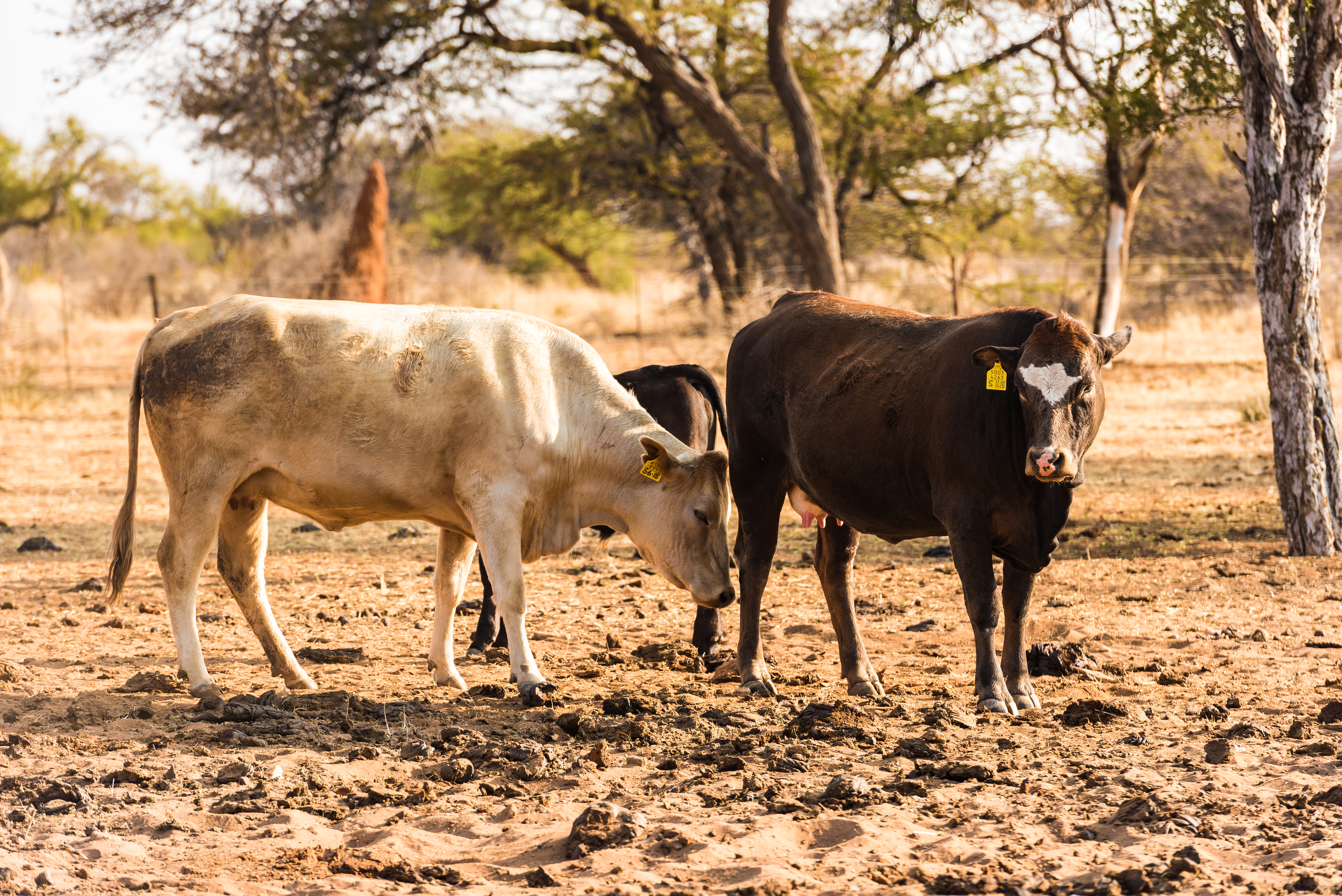
Cattle on a farm in Namibia

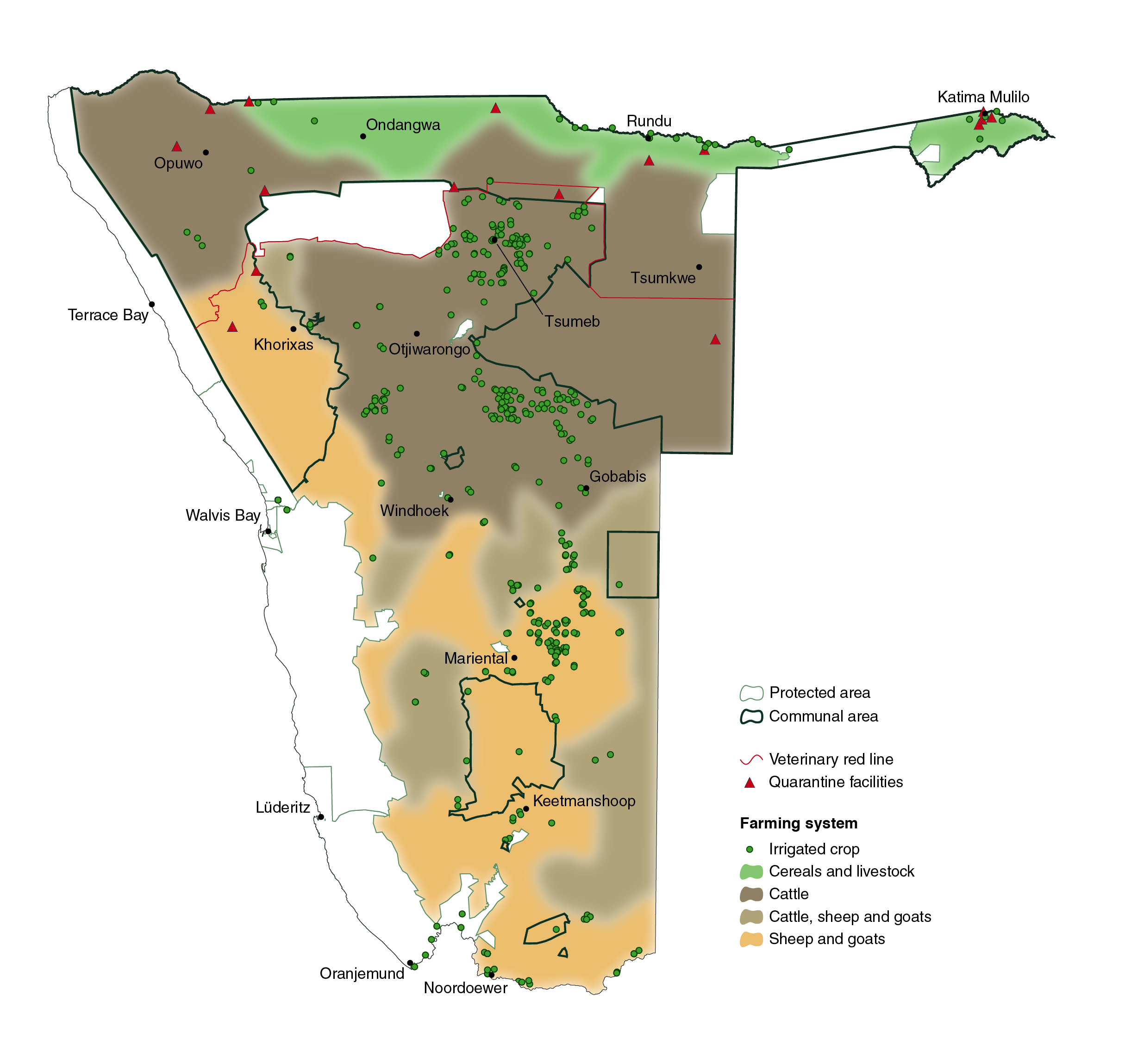
Major farm products and land uses in Namibia

Agriculture in Namibia contributes around 5% of the national Gross Domestic Product though 25% to 40% of Namibians depend on subsistence agriculture and herding. Primary products included livestock and meat products, crop farming and forestry. Only 2% of Namibia's land receives sufficient rainfall to grow crops. As all inland rivers are ephemeral, irrigation is only possible in the valleys of the border rivers Orange, Kunene, and Okavango, and also at the Hardap Irrigation Scheme.

As of 2025, the Minister of Agriculture, Water, and Land Reform (MAWLR) is Inge Zaamwani-Kamwi. The Ministry operates a number of parastatals, including NamWater.

== Economics ==
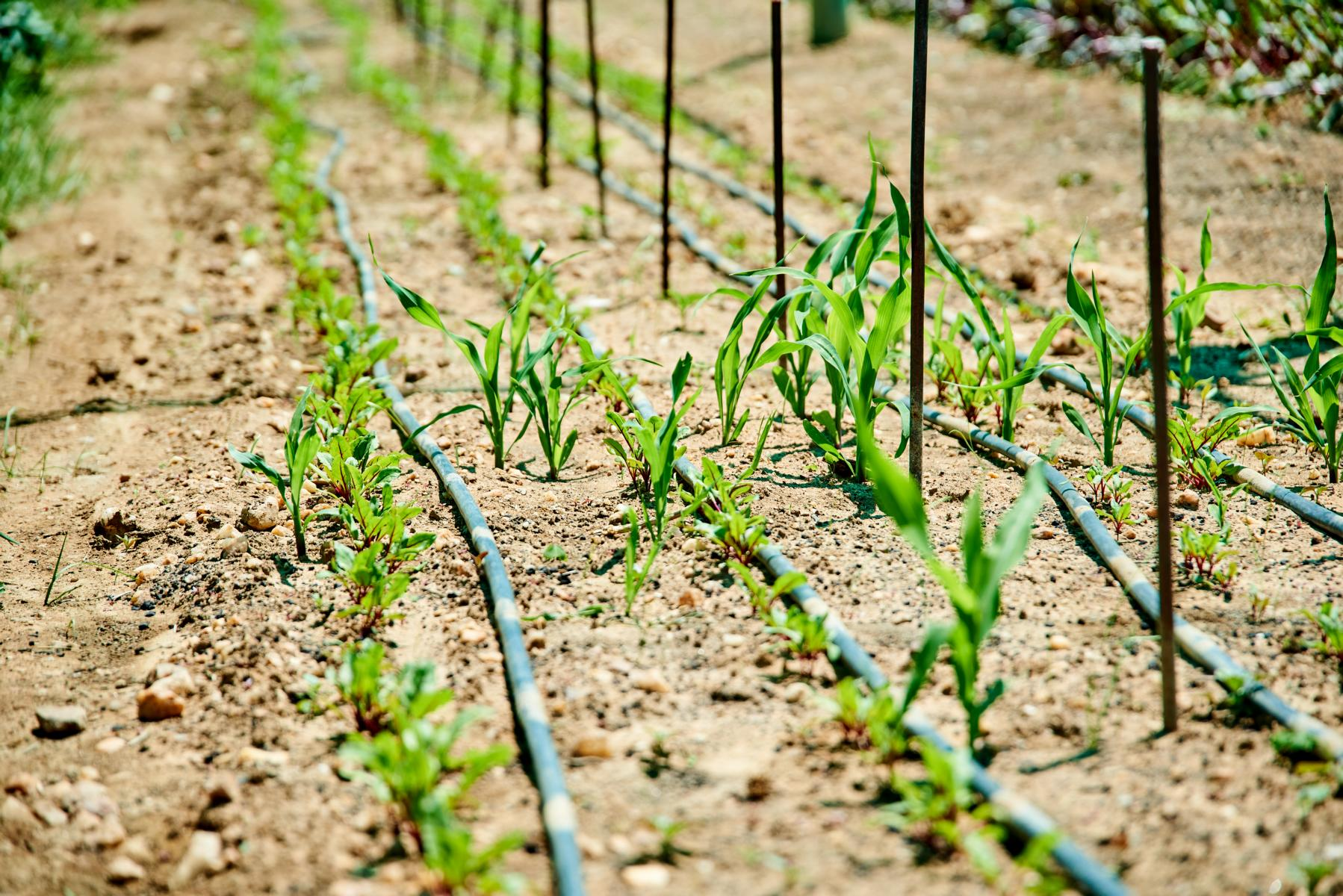
Irrigation agriculture in Namibia

Although Namibian agriculture, excluding fishing, contributed between 5% and 6% of Namibia's GDP from 2004 to 2009, a large percentage of the Namibian population depends on agricultural activities for livelihood, mostly in the subsistence sector. Animal products, live animals, and crop exports constituted roughly 10.7% of total Namibian exports. The government encourages local sourcing of agriculture products. Retailers of fruits, vegetables, and other crop products must purchase 27.5% of their stock from local farmers.The 'Agriculture and forestry' sector registered a growth of 1.6 percent in real value added during the first quarter of 2024, relative to an increase of 1.9 percent recorded in the corresponding quarter of 2023 (NSA,2024).

In the largely white-dominated commercial sector, agriculture consists primarily of livestock ranching. In 2010 there were about 4,000 commercial farms in Namibia, 3,000 of which owned by whites. Cattle raising is predominant in the central and northern regions, while sheep and goat farming are concentrated in the more arid southern regions. Subsistence farming is mainly confined to the "communal lands", of the country's populous North, where roaming cattle herds are prevalent, and the main crops are millet, sorghum, corn, and peanuts.

Table grapes, grown mostly along the Orange River in the country's arid south, are becoming an increasingly important commercial crop and a significant employer of seasonal labor. Rain-fed white maize is produced by farmers mainly in the maize triangle situated between Tsumeb, Otavi and Grootfontein.

== Challenges ==
=== Increasing aridity and droughts ===
Rising temperatures and recurrent droughts render conventional agriculture increasingly unfeasible in Namibia. A multi-year drought leading up to 2019 has been described as the worst in the last century. Due to the low annual rainfall, livestock farming becomes gradually less profitable than commercial wildlife ranching in most parts of the country. However, the existence of an extensive networks of fences, still limits this land use. There is a need to consider the effects of climate change in the management decision, e.g. animal stocking rates.

=== Woody plant encroachment ===
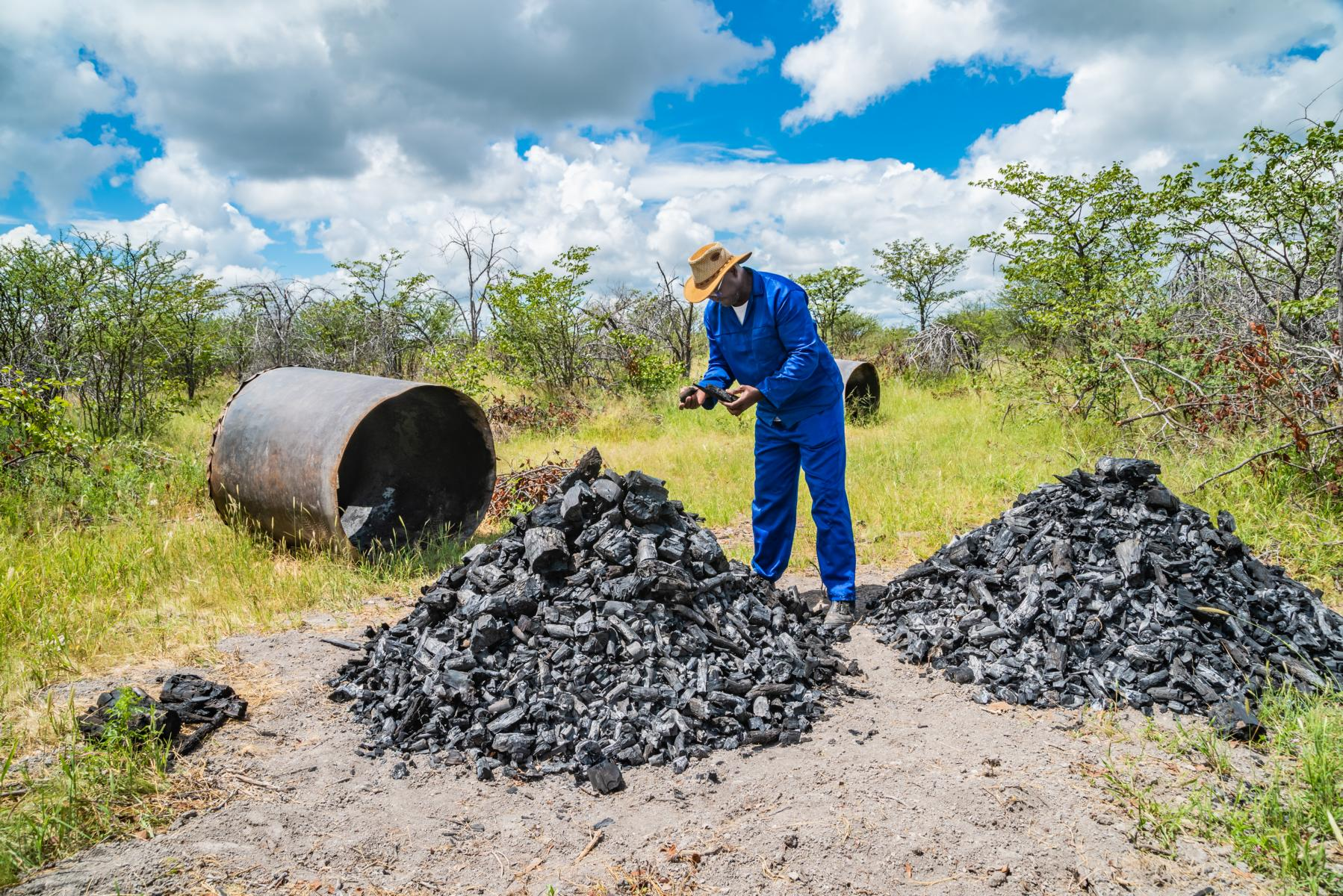
Export charcoal production from encroacher bush

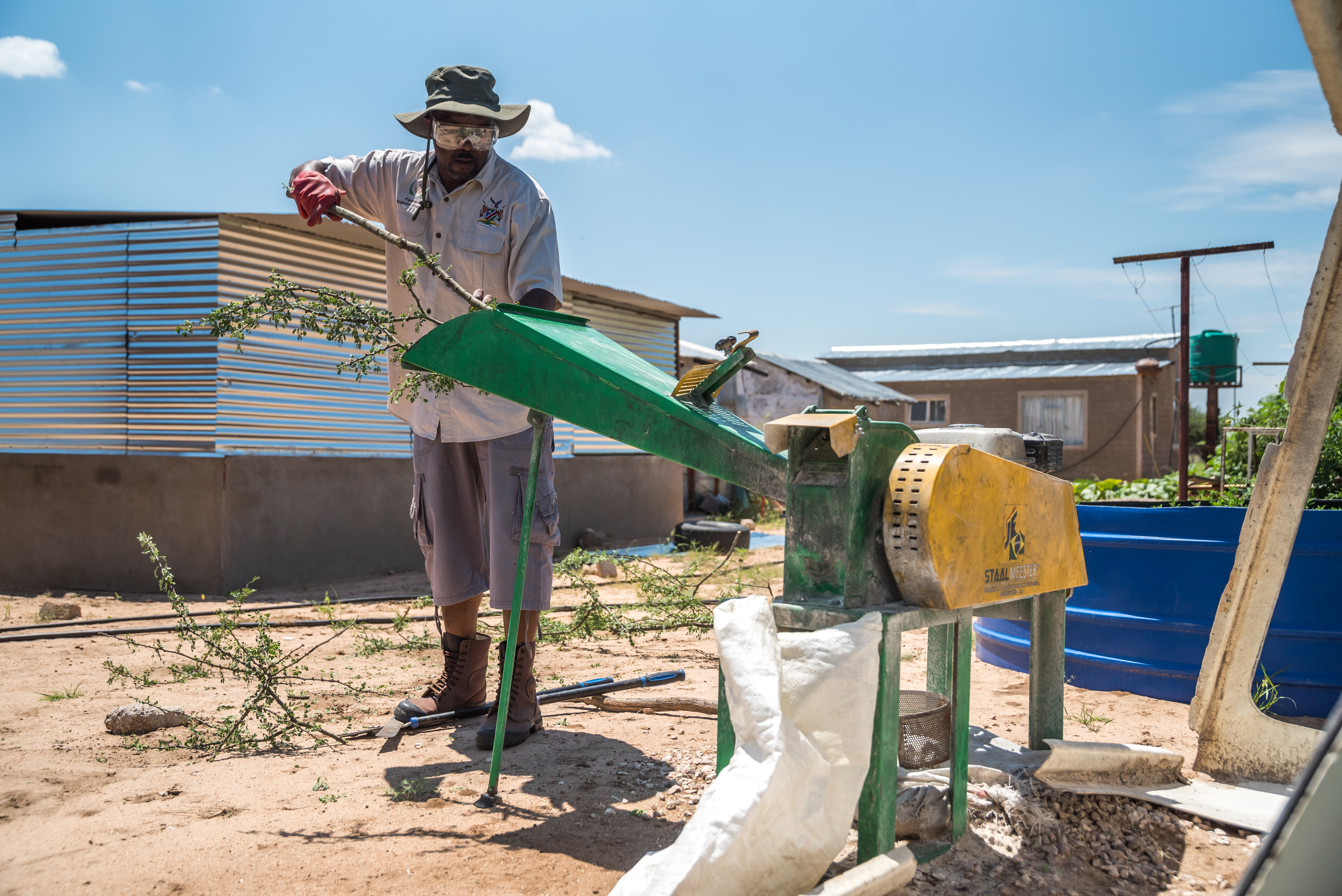
A Namibian farmer mills branches of encroacher bush for the production of animal fodder

Woody plant encroachment, locally called bush encroachment, is the thickening of indigenous bush and shrub species at the expense of grass. It has developed into a significant threat for agriculture in Namibia over the past decades. While woody encroachment is a global phenomenon, it affects up to 45 million hectares of land in Namibia and there with an unusually large area Causes for bush encroachment include both land management practices (e.g. overgrazing through high stocking rates and insufficient animal rotation, suppression of natural fires) and climate change (as increased CO_{2} in the atmosphere fosters bush growth). As a result, agricultural land productivity decreases.

Approaches to the targeted reduction of bush densities included the selective bush harvesting, so-called bush thinning, and subsequent utilisation of the resulting biomass. Value chains include export charcoal, firewood, bush-based animal fodder, furniture and thermal energy applications. The production of animal fodder from encroacher bush has the potential to strengthen drought resilience, as bush fodder can function as substitute fodder when grazing is not available.

== Land reform ==
The government's land reform policy is shaped by two key pieces of legislation: the Agricultural (Commercial) Land Reform Act 6 of 1995 and the Communal Land Reform Act 5 of 2002. The government remains committed to a "willing seller, willing buyer" approach to land reform and to providing just compensation as directed by the Namibian constitution. As the government addresses the vital land and range management questions, water use issues and availability are considered.

Government statistics show that white farmers own about 70% of the country's farmland. A total of 53,773 Namibians identified as white in the 2023 census, representing 1.8% of the country's population.

== See also ==
- Namibia Agricultural Union
- Namibian wine
- Ostrich farming in Namibia
