= Kalkfeld =

- Settlement
- Location in Namibia
- Coordinates: 20°53′S 16°11′E
- Country: Namibia
- Region: Otjozondjupa Region
- Constituency: Otjiwarongo Constituency

Population (2024)
  - Total: 5,000
- Time zone: UTC+2 (South African Standard Time)

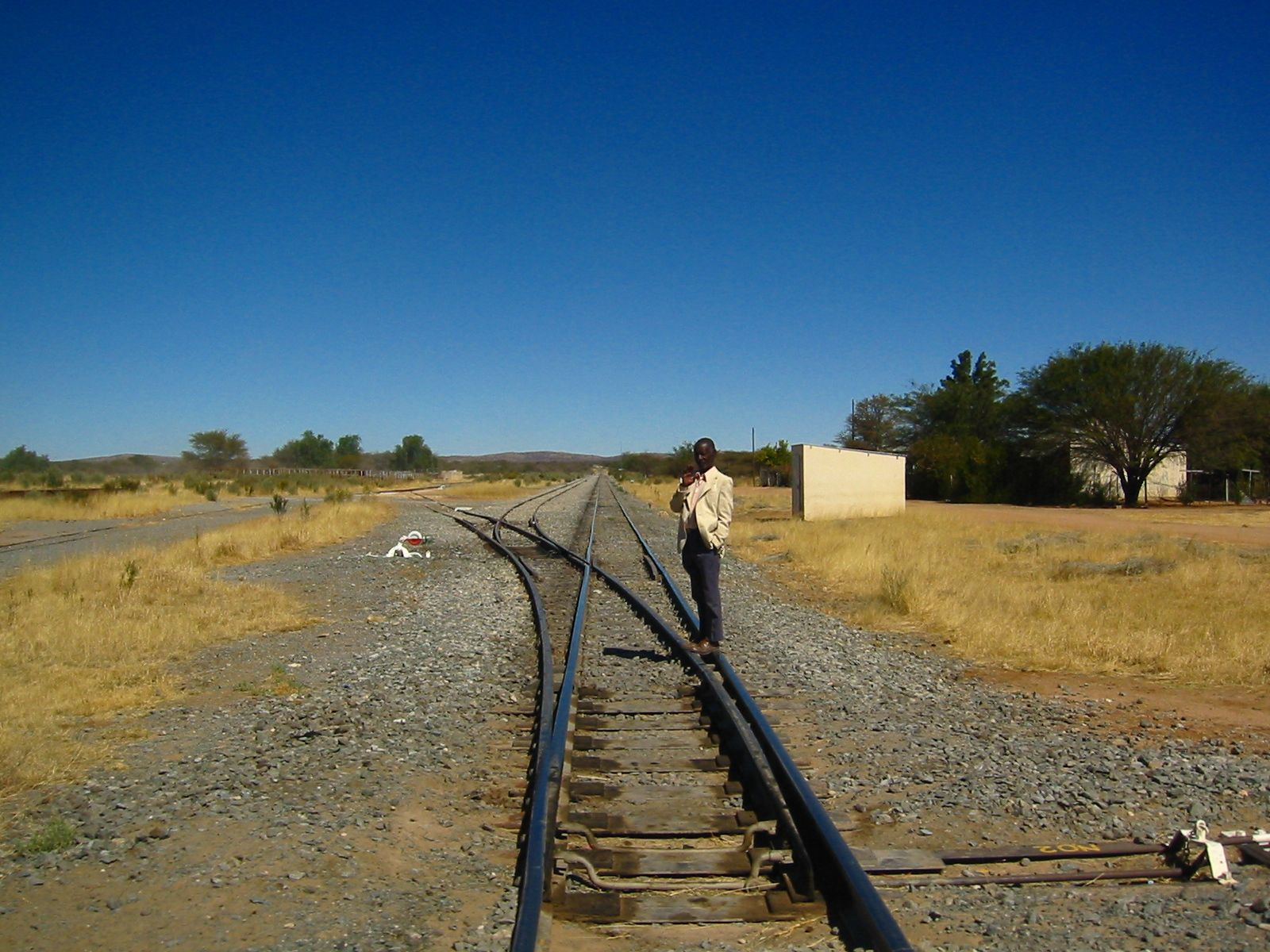
Kalkfeld railway station

Kalkfeld is a settlement in the Otjozondjupa Region of Namibia. It is situated halfway between Omaruru and Otjiwarongo on the regional road C33 and belongs to the Otjiwarongo electoral constituency.

The place normally receives an annual average rainfall of 346 millimetres (13.6 in), although in the 2010/2011 rainy season 858 millimetres (33.8 in) were measured. Due to its location in former Damaraland, the majority of the inhabitants speak Khoekhoegowab or Otjiherero.

== Economy and infrastructure ==
Kalkfeld was proclaimed a village in 1991 and governed by a seven-seat village council. In the 1992 Namibian local elections, the opposition Democratic Turnhalle Alliance (DTA) gained 245 votes and four seats, winning over SWAPO (91 votes and two seats) and the United Democratic Front (Namibia) (UDF, 43 votes, one seat).

In 1996 Kalkfeld was downgraded to settlement due to a lack of growth. It subsequently lost its governing council, and the place was thence administered by the Otjozondjupa Regional Council. The Namibian national newspaper referred to the settlement as "ghost town", situated in "the middle of nowhere". Since the downgrading living standards have further deteriorated. Of the 5,000 inhabitants (As of 2024) less than 100 are employed. The settlement is also affected by water and electricity shortages.

Construction of a business complex and a tourist centre started in 2012 but the construction never finished, and the buildings lay dormant as a result. Only the fuel station and a shop were opened in 2019.

Kalkfeld has a Police station and a clinic. It is served by a station of the Namibia Railway Network. Local residents often make use of donkey carts to get from point to point.

== Education ==
There is one primary school, Kalkfeld Primary School in the location, and one secondary school, G.K. Wahl Combined School downtown, with only one class per grade as there are not a lot of children in the town.

== Tourism ==
23 kilometres (14 mi) east of Kalkfeld lies Otjihaenamparero, a farm where 170-million-year-old dinosaur footprints can be seen.
