= Otavi Constituency =

Electoral constituency in the Otjozondjupa region of Namibia

Coordinates: 19°39′S 17°20′E

Otavi constituency (red) in the Otjozondjupa Region

Otavi Constituency is an electoral constituency in the Otjozondjupa Region of Namibia. It had 11,620 inhabitants in 2004 and 9,608 registered voters in 2020. The constituency consists of the town of Otavi and the surrounding rural area.

== Economy and infrastructure ==
Otavi Constituency is known for its above-average rainfall and its agricultural production. Together with Grootfontein and Tsumeb, Otavi forms the edges of the Otavi Triangle, an area known for its maize production and its relative prosperity. Namib Mills has a factory in Otavi, one of the major employers in town.

The Otavi Mountains after which the constituency is named have long been known to contain mineral deposits. Vanadium was discovered in 1908 and mined thereafter but the deposits were exhausted in the 1970s. The Kombat copper mine and the Otjikoto Gold mine are situated within the constituency, as is the Ohorongo Cement factory.

== Politics ==
Otavi is traditionally a stronghold of the South West Africa People's Organization (SWAPO) party. In the 2004 regional election, SWAPO candidate Barthromeus Tuhafeni Shangheta received 2,431 of the 3,578 votes cast and became councillor.

The 2015 regional election was won by Laina Mekundi of SWAPO with 1,982 votes, followed by Fred Grundeling of the Democratic Turnhalle Alliance (DTA) with 325 votes and Bella Hunibes of the All People’s Party (APP) with 191 votes. The SWAPO candidate also won the 2020 regional election. George Garab received 1,567 votes; The independent candidate Johannes Johannes came second with 769 votes.
