= Omatjenne Dam =

Dam in Namibia

- Opening date: 1933

Omatjenne Dam is a dam in Otjozondjupa Region of Namibia. Located 15 km northwest of Otjiwarongo, it dams the Omatjenne River and was built for the purpose of artificial recharge of ground water. It has a capacity of 5.063 million cubic metres and was completed in 1933, when the country was controlled by South Africa.
