= Syama Hybrid Power Station =

Hybrid power station in Mali

- Official name: Centrale électrique hybride de Syama
- Country: Mali
- Location: Syama, Kadiolo Cercle, Sikasso Region
- Coordinates: 10°47′35″N 06°03′36″W
- Status: Operational
- Construction began: 2020
- Commission date: 2021 (1st phase); 2023 (2nd phase)
- Owner: Syama Gold Mine
- Operator: Aggreko

Solar farm
- Type: Flat-panel PV

Power generation
- Nameplate capacity: 70 MW (94,000 hp)

The Syama Hybrid Power Station (French: Centrale électrique hybride de Syama) is a planned 70 megawatts hybrid power plant in Mali. The power station is being developed by Aggreko, a company that is based in Glasgow, Scotland, United Kingdom, which supplies temporary power generation equipment. The off-taker is Syama Gold Mine, owned by Resolute Mining, that is based in Perth, Western Australia. The station has thermal, battery storage and solar energy components. Aggreko signed a 16-year agreement with the owners of the gold mine to design, build, operate and maintain this hybrid power station. Under the same agreement, Syra Gold Mine will purchase the electricity generated by the new hybrid plant, as specified in the power purchase agreement.

== Location ==
The power station is located near the settlement of Mbembéré, in the Kadiolo Cercle, in Sikasso Region in southern Mali, near the border with Ivory Coast. The power station sits adjacent to the Syama Gold Mine, approximately 83 kilometres (52 mi) southwest of Sikasso, the regional headquarters. This is about 360 kilometres (224 mi) southeast of Bamako, the capital and largest city in the country.

== Overview ==
The phased development of the hybrid power station involves the installation of three Wärtsilä Modular Blocks each rated at 10 megawatts. These units use refined fuel oil (IF0 180), which is cheaper than diesel. A battery storage system rated at 10 megawatts is also installed to smoothen out power fluctuations in the system. These installations totaling 40 megawatts were installed in 2020, with commissioning in 2021.

The second phase comprises a fourth 10 megawatts Wärtsilä 32 engine, to be installed in 2022 and a solar power component with 20 megawatts capacity planned to come online in 2023.

== Benefits ==
Prior to the development of this hybrid power station, Resolute Mining Limited needed to reduce the cost of power used to operate its underground gold mine in Mali. This was occasioned by the escalating cost of diesel fuel and the need to keep the power supply on 24/7. Connection to the Malian grid was ruled out due to the cost and time it would take to build the necessary transmission infrastructure. This hybrid system, if it works as designed, is expected to reduce power acquisition costs at the mine by 40 percent.

== See also ==
- List of power stations in Mali
- Fekola Hybrid Power Station
