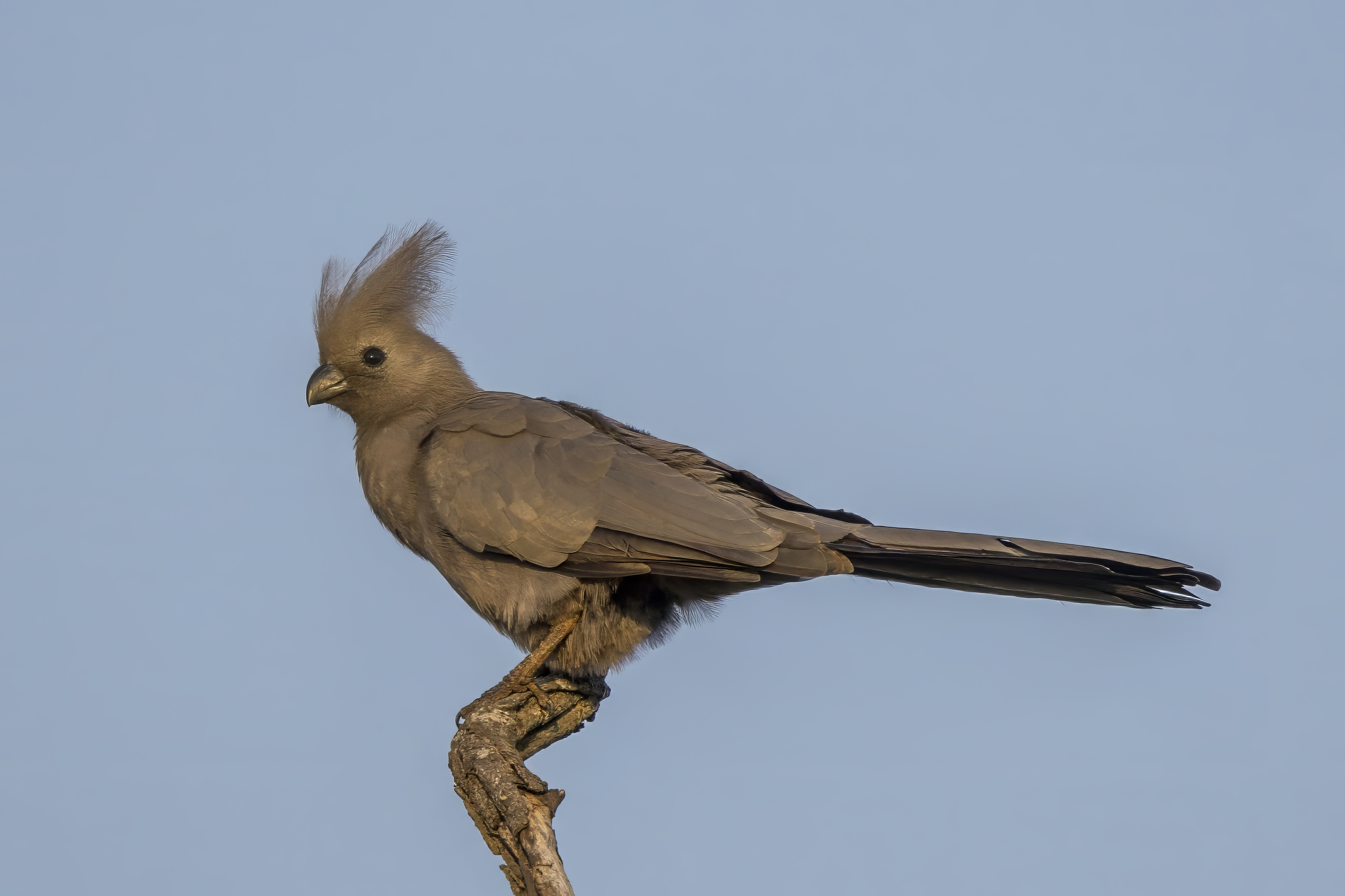
- Nominate subspecies in Kruger National Park
- C. c. bechuanae in South Africa; calls recorded at a night roost

Conservation status
- Least Concern (IUCN 3.1)

Scientific classification
- Kingdom: Animalia
- Phylum: Chordata
- Class: Aves
- Order: Musophagiformes
- Family: Musophagidae
- Genus: Crinifer
- Species: C. concolor

Binomial name
- Crinifer concolor (Smith, 1833)

= Grey go-away-bird =

Species of bird

The grey go-away-bird (Crinifer concolor), also known as grey lourie, grey loerie, or kwêvoël, is a bold and common turaco of the southern Afrotropics. They are present in arid to moist, open woodlands and thorn savanna, especially near surface water. They regularly form groups and parties that forage in tree tops, or dust bathe on the ground. Especially when disturbed, they make their presence known by their characteristically loud and nasal "kweh" or "go-way" calls, with the last syllable typically a descending drawl. Within their range, their unique appearance and habits preclude confusion with other bird species.

== Taxonomy ==
The grey go-away-bird was formally described in 1833 by the Scottish zoologist Andrew Smith from specimens collected inland from Port Natal (now Durban) in South Africa. He coined the binomial name Corythaix concolor. The specific epithet concolor is Latin meaning "uniform", "similar in colour" or "plain". The grey go-away-bird is now placed in the genus Crinifer that was introduced by the Polish zoologist Feliks Paweł Jarocki in 1821.

Four subspecies are recognised:

- C. c. molybdophanes (Clancey, 1964) – northeast Angola to south Tanzania, north Malawi and north Mozambique. Greyer chest plumage than bechuanae.
- C. c. pallidiceps (Neumann, 1899) – west Angola to central Namibia
- C. c. bechuanae (Roberts, 1932) – south Angola and northeast Namibia to Zimbabwe and north South Africa. Olive wash on chest plumage.
- C. c. concolor (Smith, A, 1833) – south Malawi and central Mozambique to east South Africa. Only faint olive wash on chest plumage, paler grey below than bechuanae.

== Description ==
The sexes are similar. They measure 47–51 cm from bill tip to tail tip, and weigh some 200 to 300 g. They have an almost uniform smoky-grey plumage with long tails and (similar to mousebirds) a wispy, back-swept crest of some 6 to 7 cm in length. The crest can be raised almost vertically when excited. The strong, decurved beak is black and the gape and tongue strikingly pink. The plumage is darkest grey on the chin and throat, and palest around the eyes and on the belly. The breast plumage is washed slightly olive like that of its near relative, the bare-faced go-away-bird.

== Distribution and habitat ==
It is native to southern Angola, southern DRC, Zambia, southern Tanzania, Malawi, Mozambique, Namibia, Botswana, Zimbabwe, South Africa and Eswatini. It occupies any arid to moist, and relatively open savanna woodlands, especially where Acacia trees are present. They frequent the edges of miombo woodland, and occur commonly along water courses, dry riparian forest and in Acacia woodland on alluvium. It also occurs commonly on farms and in suburban gardens and parks. They require water, and disperse along tributaries of desert rivers when water flows. It is absent from areas that lack suitable fruiting trees, and seems to desert areas where woody plant encroachment occurs. They have no regular migrations, but wander about irregularly in search of food and water.

== Behaviour and ecology ==
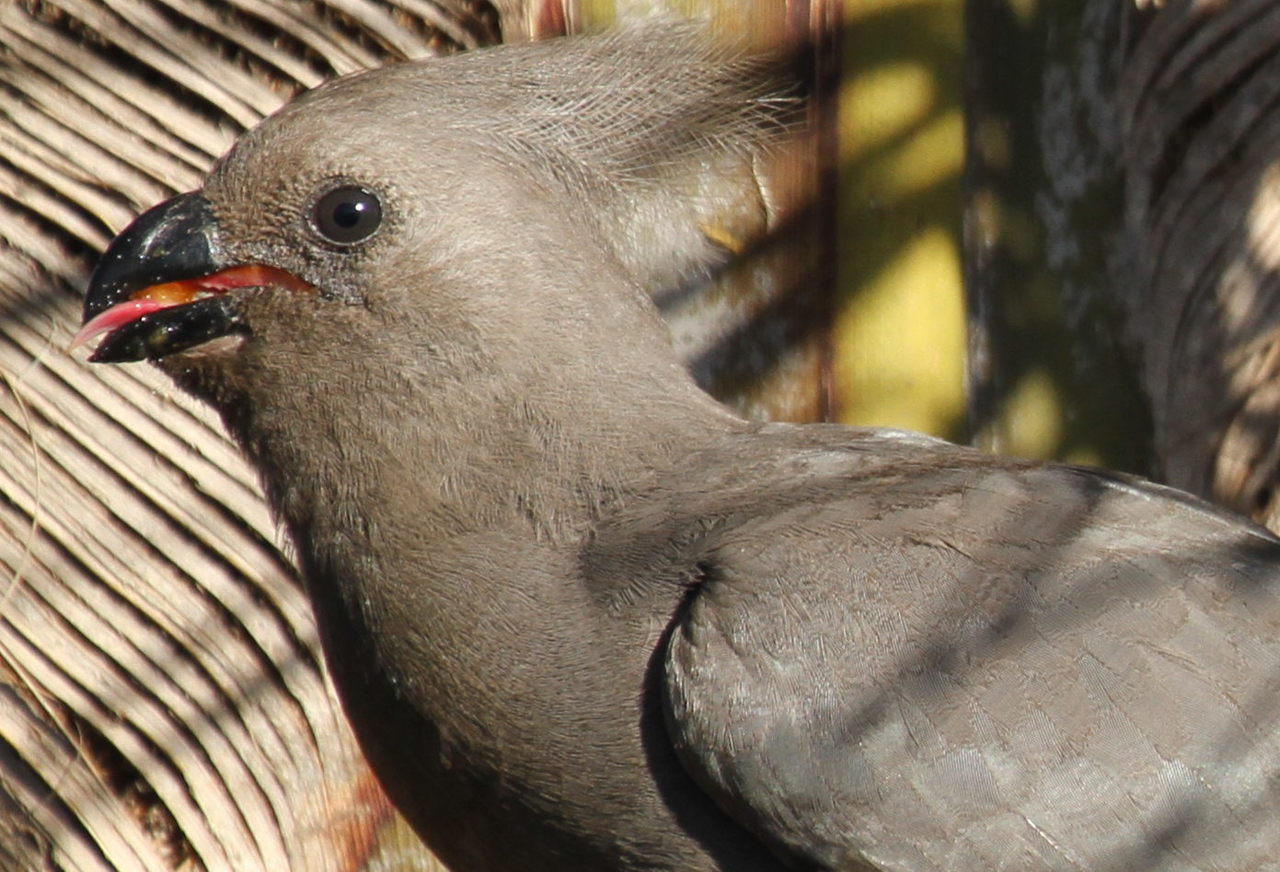

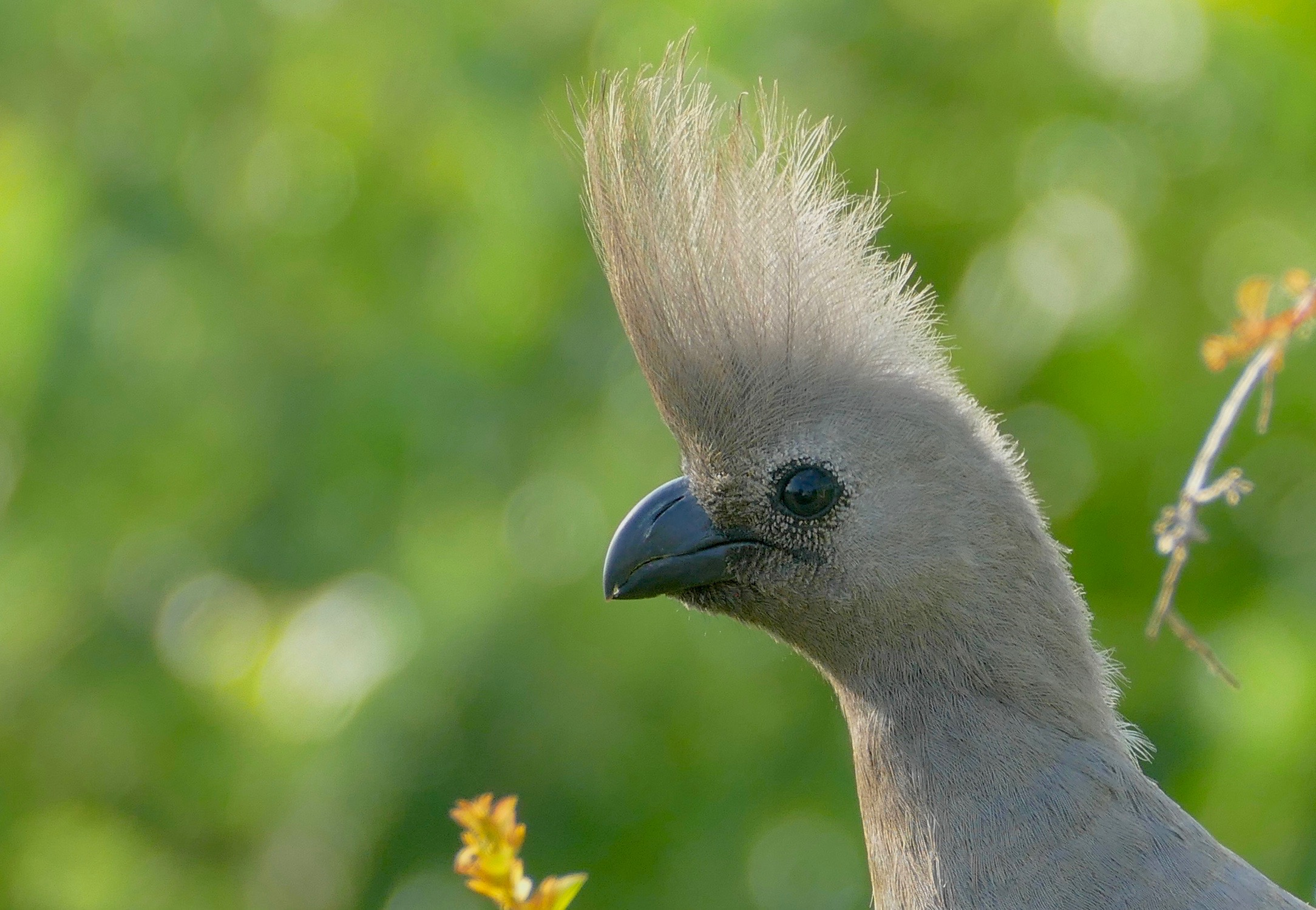
Close-up views of the pink gape and tongue, and the wispy crest

Though their flight is rather slow and laboured, they can cover long distances. Once in the open tree tops however, they can display the agility which is associated with the Musophagidae, as they run along tree limbs and jump from branch to branch. They can form groups and parties numbering even 20 to 30 that move about in search of fruit and insects near the tree tops.

=== Food and feeding ===
Its diet is mainly fruit (such as wild figs and berries), flowers, buds, leaves, termites, and snails. Fruit are obtained from plants in the genera Ficus, Viscum, Loranthus, Diospyros, Lannea, Ziziphus, Salvadora and Flueggea, among others. They also feed on fruit of exotic invasives like seringa, and disperse their seeds.

=== Breeding ===
The flimsy nest platform is built from fairly thin, and often thorny sticks. It has the appearance of a substantial dove's nest, and their almost round, white eggs can be seen from below. Usually three eggs are laid in a nest that is placed at the center of an isolated tree. The adults share all parental duties, and the chicks start clambering about before they are able to fly. The chicks are covered in dense brownish down, and are fed regurgitated food by the parents. The breeding season is July to August in Angola, April to November in Malawi, August to September in Zambia, Sept and December to April in Namibia, and all months in Zimbabwe and South Africa.

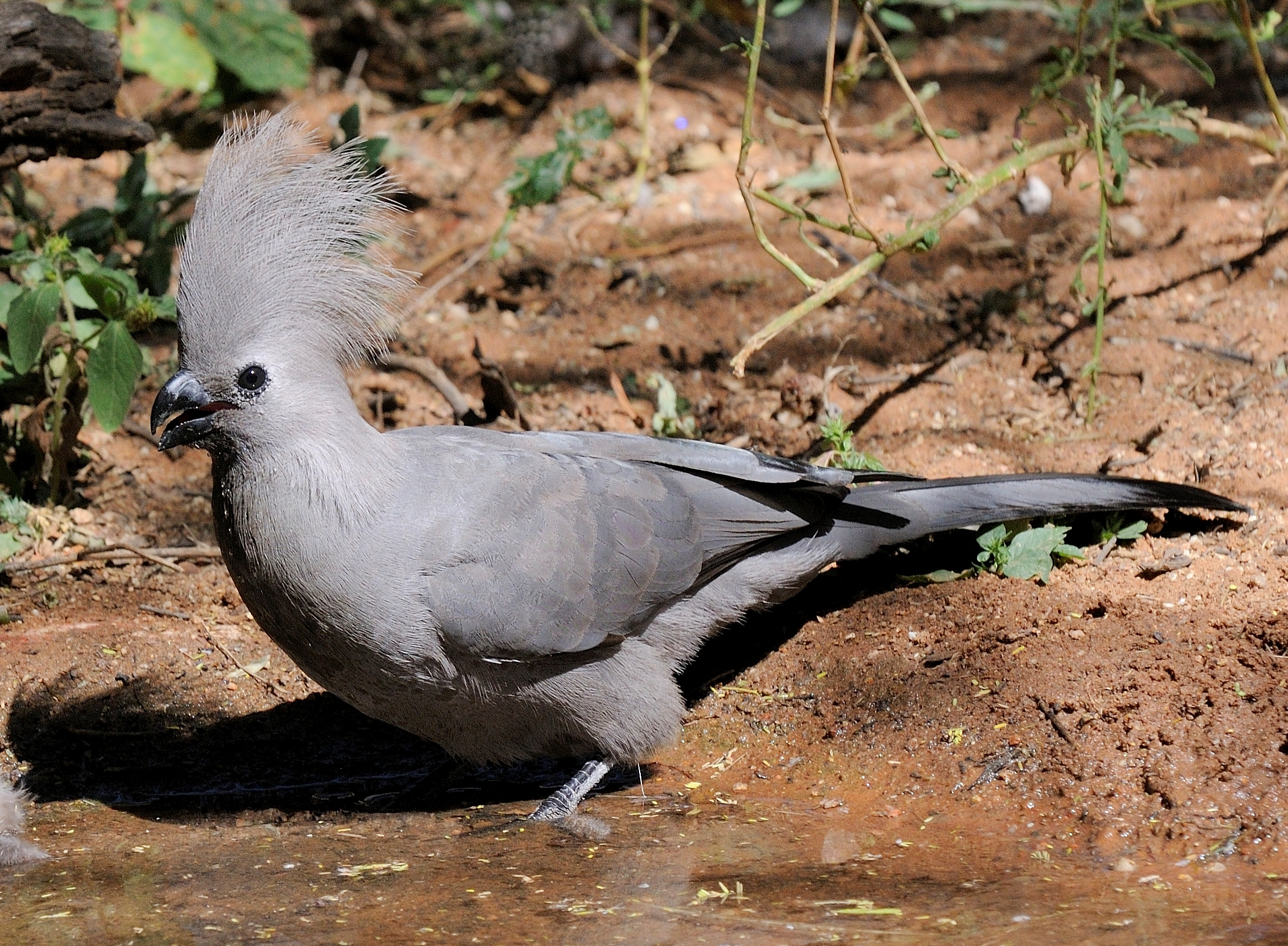
The western race, C. c. pallidiceps, at Okonjima, Namibia

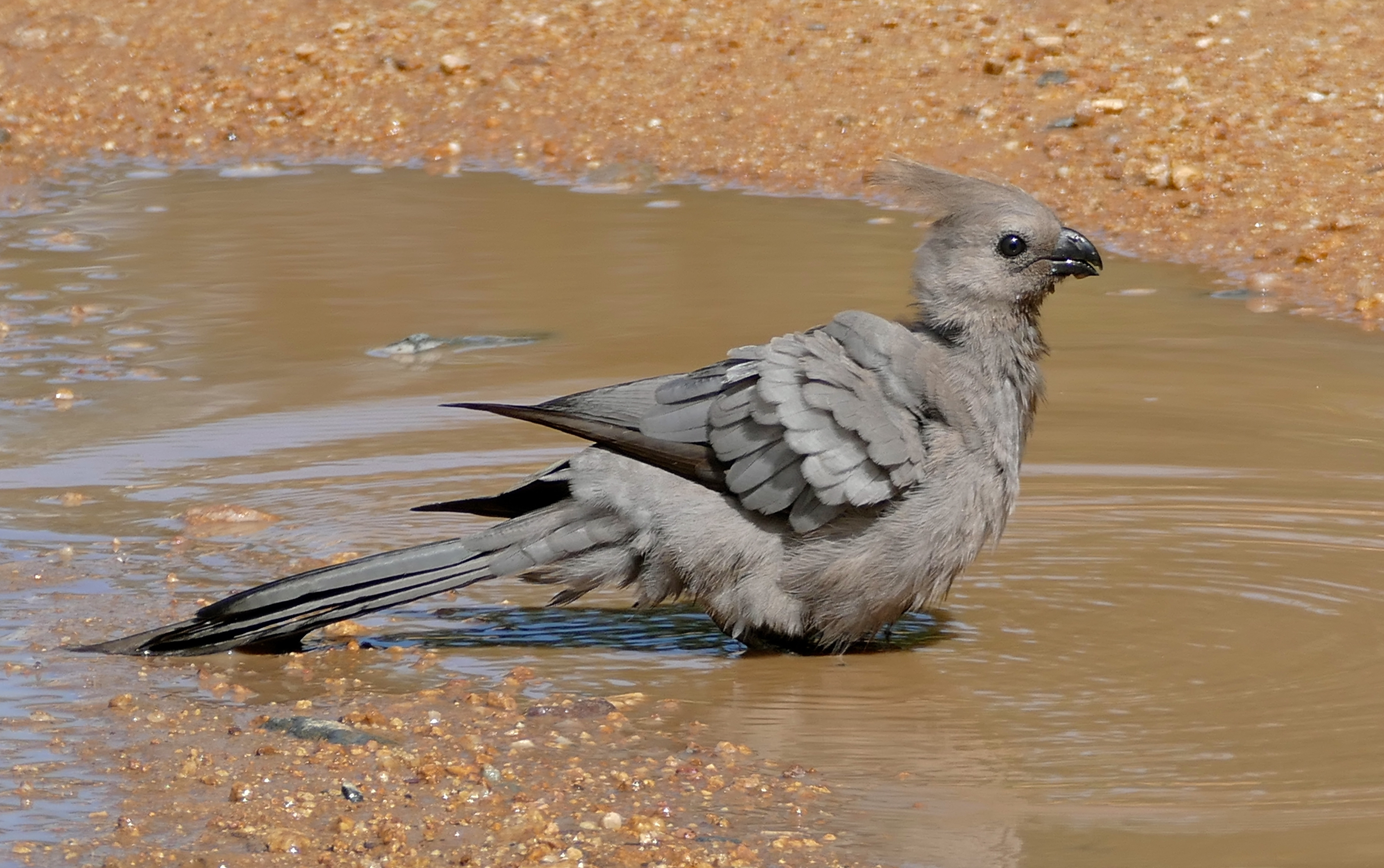
The eastern race, C. c. concolor, in South Africa
