= Fekola Hybrid Power Station =

Hybrid power station in Mali

- Official name: Centrale électrique hybride de Fekola
- Country: Mali
- Location: Fadougou, Kenieba Cercle, Kayes Region
- Coordinates: 12°32′09″N 11°21′34″W
- Status: Operational
- Construction began: 2019
- Commission date: 2021
- Owner: B2Gold Corporation

Solar farm
- Type: Flat-panel PV

Power generation
- Nameplate capacity: 115.3 MW (154,600 hp)

The Fekola Hybrid Power Station (French Centrale électrique hybride de Fekola) is a 115 MW (154,000 hp) power plant in Mali. The power system comprises 68 MW of thermal energy, 30 MW of solar power and 17.3 MW of lithium ion battery energy storage. The power station is owned by B2Gold Corporation, a Canadian mining company. Dornier Suntrace GmbH (also Suntrace) and BayWa, two German engineering consulting and construction companies were hired to advise, design, build, operate and maintain this power station. The off-taker is the Fekola Gold Mine, in southwestern Mali, that is off-grid and is owned by B2Gold.

== Location ==
The power station is located in the settlement of Fadougou, in Kenieba Cercle, in the Kayes Region in southwestern Mali, near the border with Senegal. Fekola Gold Mine is located approximately 61 kilometres (38 mi), southwest of Kenieba, the nearest large town. This is approximately 450 kilometres (280 mi) west of Bamako, the capital and largest city in the country.

== Overview ==
Before 2019, the Fekola gold mine had a legacy thermal power station with capacity of 68 megawatts. The thermal station has six units, with each unit capable of generating 11.33 MW at maximum output. These units use heavy fuel oil. On the advice of Dornier Suntrace GmbH and BayWa, B2Gold Corporation, who own the power station added a 30 MW solar power unit and a 17.3MW/15.4 MWh battery storage system to modulate power availability between the thermal units and the solar farm. The mine requires electricity supply 24/7.

The battery energy storage system was supplied by Wärtsilä of Finland. The software selected is the Greensmith Energy Management System (GEMS), also supplied by Wärtsilä. It integrates and modulates energy supply between the three types of energy sources; thermal, solar and battery storage.

== Benefits ==
The addition of the solar farm and the battery storage system allows the power station to rest three of the six thermal generators during the day. This allows the electricity demand of the gold mine during daytime to be covered up to 75 percent by renewable energy. The mine is able to avoid the burning of over 13,000,000 liters of heavy fuel oil annually. This lowers the carbon dioxide footprint of this mine by 39,000 tonnes every year.

== See also ==
- List of power stations in Mali
- Syama Hybrid Power Station
