= Marlyn Mbakera =

Namibian politician and member of parliament

Member of the National Assembly of Namibia
- Incumbent
- Assumed office 20 March 2025

Personal details
- Party: SWAPO

Marlyn Mbakera is a Namibian politician from SWAPO who has been a member of the Parliament of Namibia since 2025. She was previously a councillor for Otjiwarongo Constituency in Otjozondjupa Region. She served as chairperson of the Otjozondjupa Regional Council.

== See also ==
- List of members of the 8th National Assembly of Namibia
