= Otto Ipinge =

Namibian politician

MP Otto Ipinge

Governor of Otjozondjupa Region
- In office April 2015 – 2020
- Preceded by: Rapama Kamehozu
- Succeeded by: James Uerikua

Regional Councillor of Otjiwarongo Constituency
- In office 2010–2015

Mayor of Otjiwarongo

Personal details
- Born: Otjiwarongo, Namibia

Otto Ipinge is a Namibian politician. A member of SWAPO, Ipinge is the former mayor of Otjiwarongo. As mayor, Ipinge focused on attracting investment to the city, effective management and efficiency as well as increasing tourism, agriculture and mineral management. As of June 2009, he was the electoral coordinator for SWAPO in his native Otjozondjupa Region.

Prior to the 2009 general election, Ipinge was placed on SWAPO's electoral list at number 61. However, SWAPO only received enough votes for 54 seats and Ipinge was not elected to the National Assembly. Ipinge was subsequently elected as the regional councillor for Otjiwarongo Constituency in the 2010 regional elections. In April 2015, Ipinge was appointed governor of the Otjozondjupa Region. He served in this position until 2020.
