= James Uerikua =

Namibian politician (1982–2026)

James Unomasa Uerikua (2 August 1982 – 3 April 2026) was a Namibian politician. A member of the South West African People's Organisation (SWAPO), Uerikua served as the Governor of Otjozondjupa Region from 2020 to 2025, and served as a member of the National Assembly of Namibia from 2025 until his death in 2026.

== Career ==
Uerikua served in various capacities in the Namibian government.

- 2025–2026: Served as a member of the National Assembly of Namibia
- 2020–2025: Regional Governor: Otjozondjupa Region, Office of the President, Otjiwarongo.
- 2014–2020: Chief Development Planner, office of the Vice President, Windhoek.
- 2012–2014: Principal Development Planner at the Officer of the Office of the Prime Minister.

While serving as Member of Parliament, he was also chairing the Parliamentary committee on International Relations, Defence and Security.

== Education ==
Uerikua graduated from Immanuel Shifidi High School in Windhoek in 2002. He furthered his studies at the University of Namibia, Neudamm Campus where he obtained a National Diploma in Agricultural Science in 2005.

Uerikua also held a Master of Business Administration Degree (MBA), Management College of Southern Africa, South Africa (2017) and a Master of Law (LLM) in International Business Law, University of Cumbria, Switzerland, which he obtained in 2025.

== Death ==
Uerikua died in a car collision between Otjiwarongo and Okakarara, on 3 April 2026, at the age of 43. Uerikua, together with his son, Venturo, were laid to rest at Gam Otjiserandu in the Otjozondjupa region on 19 April 2026.
