= Namib Mills =

Grain processing company in Windhoek, Namibia

- Company type: Private
- Founded: 1982; 44 years ago
- Headquarters: Windhoek, Namibia
- Parent: NMI Group Trust
- Website: www.namibmills.com

Namib Mills Ltd is the largest milling company in Namibia. It produces flour, pasta, animal feeds and other products from raw materials including maize, much of which is imported, and local varieties of mahangu (pearl millet). Namib Mills also packages sugar and rice.

Established in 1982, it had 820 employees in 2010. Its main milling facility is located in the capital Windhoek, and it has two others in Otavi and Katima Mulilo. Namib Mills also operates collection centers around the country. It uses the brand names Pasta Polana (since 2001), Top Score, and Meme Mahangu to market some of its products. Meme Mahangu lines include Meme Mahangu (pure), Meme Mahangu (oshikundu), Meme Mahangu (mixed) and Meme Mahangu (rice).

== See also ==
- Premier FMCG
