= Golden Pride Gold Mine =

Mine in Tanzania

Golden Pride
- Location in Tanzania
- Location: Nzega District, Tabora, Tanzania; 04°21′S 033°18′E
- Production: 148,675
- Financial year: 2009-10
- Opened: 1999
- Closed: 2013
- Company: Resolute Mining
- Website: Resolute website

The Golden Pride Gold Mine was an open pit gold mine located in Nzega District of the Tabora Region in Tanzania. Operated by the Australian mining company Resolute Mining, Golden Pride was the first modern commercial gold mining project developed in Tanzania since the country's formation in 1964.

From its opening to 2010, the mine has produced 1.68 million ounces of gold. The mine also lent its name to the Golden Pride Children's Choir, which hails from local villages around the mine and has toured internationally.

The mine was closed in late 2013. In its 15 years of operation, the mine produced more than 2.2 million ounces of gold.

== History ==
Gold mining in Tanzania in modern times dates back to the German colonial period, beginning with gold discoveries near Lake Victoria in 1894. The first gold mine in what was then Tanganyika, the Sekenke Mine, began operation in 1909. Gold mining in Tanzania experienced a boom between 1930 and World War II. However, by 1967, gold production had dropped to insignificance. It was revived in the mid-1970s, when the gold price rose once more. In the late 1990s, foreign mining companies started investing in the exploration and development of gold deposits in Tanzania, leading to the opening of a number of new mines.

The history of the Golden Pride project goes back to 1989 when Samax Resources was granted a prospecting license. In 1994, Samax entered a joint venture with BHP to develop the mine. However, in 1996, BHP decided not to progress with the project. Resolute then took over from BHP and subsequently acquired Samax's interests as well. In September 1997, Resolute completed a feasibility study for the project.

Construction of the mine was completed in November 1998, for a cost of US$48 million. The mine was opened on 7 February 1999 by the President of Tanzania, Benjamin Mkapa, with an initial mine life of seven years, which was later extended.

The mine was upgraded in 2002 from a throughput of 1.6 million tonnes to 2.6 million tonnes at a cost of US$10.6 million.

The mine was the scene of a robbery in April 2009, when 3,500 ounces of gold were stolen by armed robbers.

== Production ==
Production figures of the recent past were:

Year	Production	Grade	Cost per ounce
2007-08	150,224 ounces		US$ 449
2008-09	127,047 ounces		US$ 490
2009-10	148,675 ounces		US$ 520
