= Okonjima =

Namibian wildlife reserve

- Location within Namibia
- Location: Namibia
- Coordinates: 20°51′32″S 16°38′35″E
- Website: www.okonjima.com

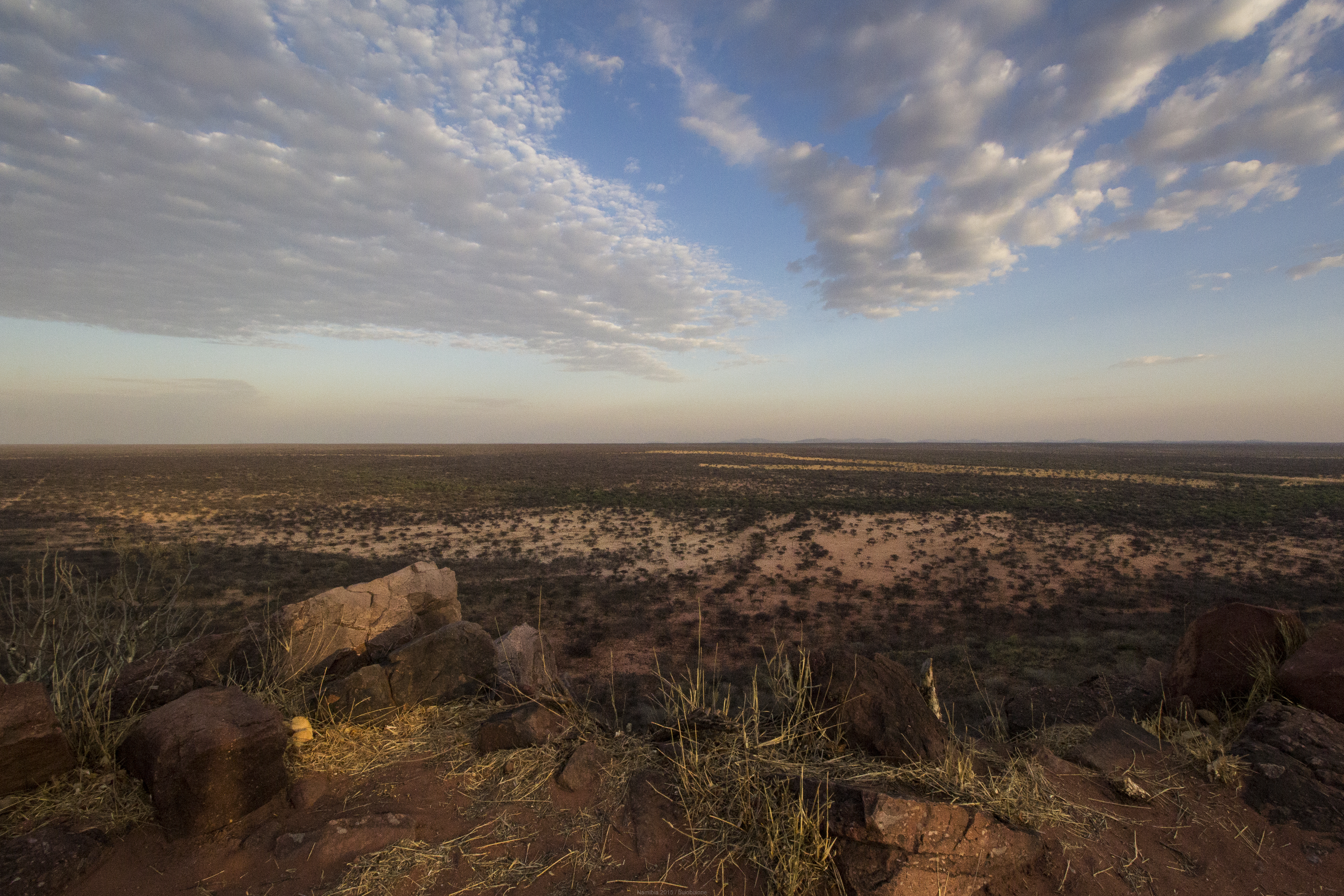
Okonjima Panorama

Okonjima (Herero: place of the baboons) is a nature reserve located 50 km (31 mi) from Otjiwarongo in the Omboroko Mountains of Namibia.

Okonjima Nature Reserve is home to the Africat Foundation, a non-profit organisation for the long-term conservation of Namibia's large carnivores and other endangered species.
