= Battle of Otavi =

Battle in 1915 during the First World War

- Part of South West Africa Campaign
Date	1 July 1915
Location	Otavi, German South West Africa 19°39′20″S 17°23′10″E
Result	South African victory

Belligerents
Germany: German Southwest Africa	South Africa

Commanders and leaders
Maj. Hermann Ritter	(Union of South Africa) Gen. Louis Botha

Strength
1,000; 10 machine guns	3,500

Casualties and losses
3 killed 8 wounded 20 captured	4 killed 7 wounded
- Location within Namibia Battle of Otavi (Africa)

The Battle of Otavi fought between the militaries of the Union of South Africa and German Southwest Africa on 1 July 1915 was the final battle of the South West Africa Campaign of World War I. The battle, fought between Otavi mountain and Otavifontein, was a delaying action led by the German Major Hermann Ritter. Ritter's forces intended to buy the main German force at Tsombe several days so as they could harden their positions there. In the end, Botha's forces were able to rout Ritter's troops, leading to an overall breakdown in the German lines that brought the campaign to an end.

== Background ==
By mid 1915 the South African advance in German Southwest Africa had gained considerable ground and efforts at negotiating a ceasefire had failed. Rather than seek a decisive battle, the German commander Victor Franke had decided to resort to keeping his army as intact as possible so as to maintain a German claim to the territory after the end of the war. Rather than resort to guerrilla warfare or attempt to break out of German Southwest Africa, Franke decided to retreat along the railway and build up defenses around Tsombe (Tsumeb). With the South African army under Louis Botha rapidly approaching, Franke decided to leave a delaying force under his second in command Major Hermann Ritter at Otavifontein. The delaying force was tasked with holding up Botha for as long as possible so that the main force at Tsombe could concentrate its forces and solidify its defenses there.

Botha began his advance on June 18, learning from intercepted communications that the Germans were retreating up the railway but would not retreat farther than Namutoni. Botha split his 13,000 troops into four columns with one on each flank and two under his personal command driving up along the railway. With a swift advance, the South Africans began to surround the German positions and Botha's central columns managed to reach Otavi by July 1. The Germans thought that Botha's advance would be hampered by a lack of water and rough terrain, and were ill-prepared for the looming South African attack. At his disposal Botha had 3,500 cavalry compared to Ritter's 1,000 infantry and ten machine guns. Although heavily outnumbered, Ritter's forces did have the advantage of the high ground, as the territory they defended was quite mountainous. Despite this advantage, Ritter feared that his force would become surrounded and spread his forces out to lengthen his line of defense.

== Battle ==
Because Ritter's line of defense was so long, his flanks were unable to support each other. That, combined with his lack of forces to man such a wide perimeter adequately, caused his left flank to falter when the South African forces advanced upon it. Fearful his lines would break, Ritter pulled back to the hills of Otavifontein and to Otavi mountain. Despite the fact that these new positions held the high ground, the Germans had not prepared any fortifications there. With no artillery and no solid defensive positions, the German force easily broke into a general retreat when pressed by Botha's troops. By 1 pm the battle had ended, with Ritter pulling back to positions near Gaub and leaving Botha with a clear path to the main German body at Tsombe.

Eugen Mansfeld, who was present at the battle as a Reserve Leutnant in the German forces, laid the blame for German defeat squarely on Franke. Mansfeld stated that Major Ritter had occupied an excellent defensive position at Otavifontein, but that on the morning of 28 June 1915 Franke arrived with his staff officer and ordered a redisposition of Ritter's forces south of the original position, separating Ritter's three artillery batteries and leaving the companies of troops widely dispersed in no logical order. Mansfeld suggested that if the Germans had kept to Ritter's original plan, the South African forces—who were unable to transport water by railway—would have been forced to retreat to the nearest water station, with severe losses to their horses as a result.

== Aftermath ==
Botha's victory was swift, with the South African advance being delayed only a day and suffering only four dead and seven wounded. The Germans had fled without putting up any committed defense, and Ritter's force fled largely intact with only three dead, eight wounded, and twenty captured. Although a delay of just two days by Ritter would have sufficed, Ritter's early withdrawal allowed Franke's unprepared forces to become nearly encircled. The German forces retreated to the farm of Khorab, where on 5 July 1915 they set up a defensive position around the farmhouse and reservoir. With no means of escaping further up the rail line and a general lack of will to pursue any other course of action, Franke had little choice but to surrender his forces to Botha on 9 July 1915, effectively ending all major German resistance in Southwest-Africa.
