= Namibian wine =

Wine making in Namibia

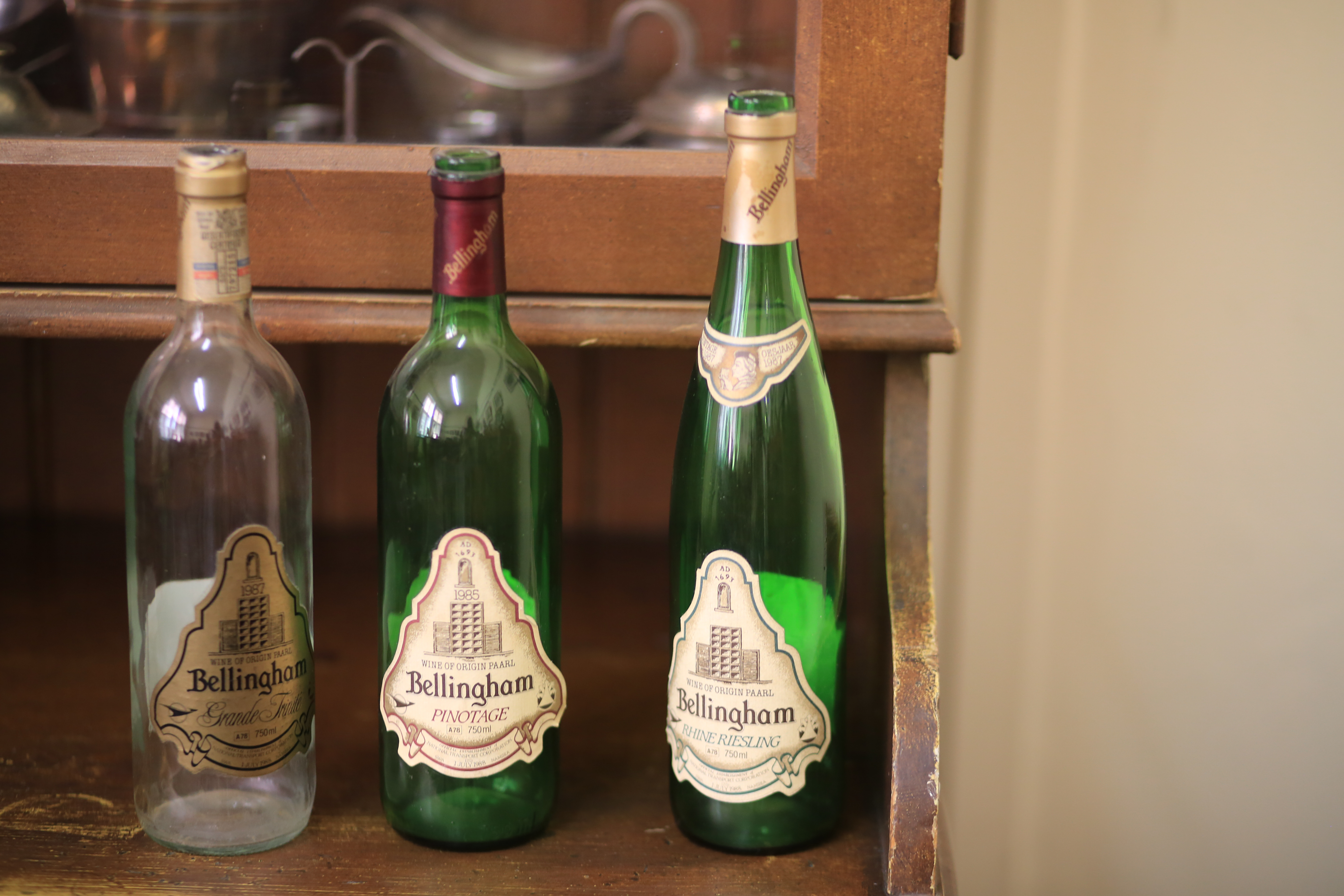
Bottles of pinotage

Namibian wine is produced in small quantities by a few wineries. Although the production of wine is expanding in Namibia, the grapes grown in the country are mostly destined for use as table grapes for export to Europe rather than for wine. One of the challenges of viticulture in Namibia is that the country is quite dry, which means that irrigation is usually necessary. Unlike its southern neighbour, South Africa, it is also situated closer to the equator than the traditional (but now challenged) "30 to 50 degrees latitude" rule of thumb of areas suitable for wine production.

== Early developments ==
Local population such as the Northern Himba tribe maintain an ancestral production of palm wine, which they call 'Otusu'.

The history of Namibian wine production began with the colonisation of Namibia by Germany in 1884. The first vineyards in Namibia were planted by German Roman Catholic priests at the end of the 19th century in the mountain valleys of the suburb of Klein Windhoek in the capital city, Windhoek. They produced a white wine and a potent schnapps named "Katholischer". Production was halted in the late 1960s, when the last wine-making priest died and the vineyards made way for building classrooms for the church school, Saint-Paul's.

== Newer developments ==
Several developments have taken place following Namibia's independence in 1990. Plantations for table grapes took place along Orange River in the southern part of the country. Small scale winemaking was pioneered in 1990 by Helmuth Kluge in the town of Omaruru. He grew Colombard and Ruby Cabernet in his plot called Kristall Kellerei, which now concentrates on brandy and fruit wines. A nearby winery Erongo Mountain Winery produces a variety of wines from European-style grapes.

Then, Allen Walken-Davis established a vineyard with Shiraz vines during the 1990s at his farm Neuras near Maltahöhe, in the south of Namibia.

In 1997, Bertus Boshoff planted his first vines at his farm, Thonninggii, in the Otavi Mountains near Otavi. He grows Shiraz, Viognier, Cabernet Sauvignon as well as small patches of Pinotage and Mourvèdre.

In 2003, the families Schulz and Evrard bought a farm 2 km away from Dr. Boshoff, and they planted Shiraz, Cabernet Sauvignon, Viognier, Mourvèdre, Tempranillo and Chardonnay in 2004.

== See also ==
- African cuisine
- West African cuisine
- Winemaking
