= Otjiwarongo Constituency =

Electoral constituency in the Otjozondjupa region of Namibia

Coordinates: 20°27′S 16°39′E

Otjiwarongo constituency (red) in the Otjozondjupa Region

Otjiwarongo Constituency is an electoral constituency in the Otjozondjupa Region of Namibia. It had 22,614 inhabitants in 2004 and 22,931 registered voters in 2020. The constituency consists of the town of Otjiwarongo and the surrounding rural area. The only other proclaimed settlement in the constituency is Kalkfeld.

== Politics ==
Otjiwarongo is traditionally a stronghold of the South West Africa People's Organization (SWAPO) party. In the 2004 regional election, SWAPO candidate Ferdinand Frederich Kavetuna received 3,767 of the 6,758 votes cast and became councillor. In the 2010 regional election, former Otjiwarongo mayor Otto Ipinge of the SWAPO Party was elected to the Otjozondjupa Regional Council. The 2015 regional election was also won by the SWAPO candidate. Julius Neumbo gained 4,565 votes, followed by Esmerelda Esme ǃAebes of the Democratic Turnhalle Alliance (DTA) with 1,254 votes and Chris Katjivive of the National Unity Democratic Organisation (NUDO) with 597 votes.

After councillor Neumbo died in 2019, a by-election was run in March 2020. Again the SWAPO candidate won. Marlyn Mbakera obtained 2,910 votes, ahead of independent candidate Erastus Mbumba (1,020 votes) and Sebeteus Guiteb of the Landless People's Movement (LPM, a new party registered in 2018, 752 votes). Councillor Mbakera was re-elected in the 2020 regional election. She received 4,173 votes, well ahead of Erastus Mbumba, now of the Independent Patriots for Change (IPC), a party formed in August 2020, who obtained 1,592 votes. Asariel Iilonga of the Popular Democratic Movement (PDM, the new name of the DTA) came third with 721 votes, followed by Lazarus Januarie (LPM, 524 votes) and Johannes Nauiseb (NUDO, 450 votes).
