= Okakarara Senior Secondary School =

School in Namibia

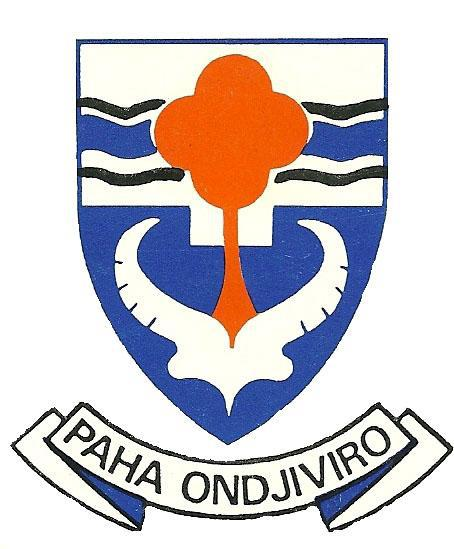
- Okakarara, Otjozondjupa Region; Namibia

Information
- Established: 1973; 52 years ago
- Enrollment: 595 (2016)

Okakarara Senior Secondary School is a secondary school located in Okakarara in the Otjozondjupa of central Namibia. The school started operating in 1973 and in 2016 had 595 learners.
