= Ohorongo Cement =

Cement factory in Namibia

Ohorongo Cement (Pty) Ltd
- Industry: cement
- Founded: 2007
- Headquarters: Windhoek, Namibia
- Key people: Gerhard Hirth, Klaus Bauer, Peter Frank Koep
- Number of employees: 300 (expected 2010/2011)
- Parent: Schwenk Zement KG
- Website: www.ohorongo-cement.com

Ohorongo Cement is a cement factory on farm Sargberg near Otavi in the Otjozondjupa Region of Namibia. It is one of two Namibian cement factories and has a production capacity of 0.7 Mt (690,000 long tons; 770,000 short tons) per annum.

The ground breaking ceremony for the construction of the plant was held in January 2009. A roof wetting celebration took place in February 2010, when the preheater tower reached its final height of 109 meters. Production started in December 2010.

Initially wholly owned by the Schwenk Zement KG, Ohorongo states that ownership is to be transferred to Namibian institutions over time. In 2019, Schwenk still owned 69.83%, with the Development Bank of Namibia the largest minority shareholder. After the 2018 production start of Cheetah Cement, a second, larger, cement factory nearby, Schwenk offered its shareholding for sale. A 2019 acquisition offer by investment company West China Cement, however, was turned down by the Namibian Competition Commission because West China already owns Cheetah Cement.
