= National Youth Council of Namibia =

- Abbreviation: NYC
- Formation: 1990; 36 years ago
- Type: Youth organisation
- Location: Windhoek, Namibia
- President: Mandela Kapere

The National Youth Council of Namibia is charged with policy formulation and implementation on issues bordering on youth development in Namibia. It is the umbrella body of the youths of Namibia and was given legal recognition in 1990 at the time of independence. It is affiliated to the Pan-African Youth Union and represents about 60 000 Namibian youths.

== Structure ==
According to the youth policy, youths are persons between the ages of 18 and 35.

The National Youth Council of Namibia has 120 local government branches, led by coordinators and youth leaders. It is led by a chairperson elected every five years. Patience Masua is the current chairperson.

== See also ==
- Panafrican Youth Union
- World Assembly of Youth
