= AfriCat Foundation =

Namibian conservation organisation

- Founded: 1991
- Founder: Wayne Hanssen, The Hanssen Family
- Type: Conservation of large carnivores
- Purpose: Education and Carnivore rehabilitation
- Location: Otjiwarongo, Namibia
- Region served: Okonjima, Otjiwarongo (Namibia)
- Method: Conservation through Education
- Owner: Hanssen Family
- Key people: Tammy Hoth (Exec. Director)
- Affiliations: Africat UK; Africat USA; Okonjima Lodge
- Website: africat.org

The AfriCat Foundation is a Namibian non-profit organisation dedicated to the long-term conservation of Namibia's large carnivores and native wildlife. Based within the 200 km^{2} (77 sq mi) Okonjima Nature Reserve near Otjiwarongo, the foundation focuses on scientific research, habitat restoration, and human–wildlife conflict mitigation.

== History ==
The AfriCat Foundation was established in 1991 and officially registered as a non-profit organisation in 1993. Initially centered on rescuing, rehabilitating, and relocating trapped or injured cheetahs and leopards, the foundation gradually transitioned from hands-on animal rescue toward broader scientific research, education, and ecosystem-level preservation.
