= Ostrich farming in Namibia =

Around 1900, ostrich farming peaked in Southern Africa. The birds were farmed for their feathers and hides. Today that has changed for people have realised that ostrich meat is lean and healthy to eat. In Namibia, farmers catch the wild birds under license or buy eggs or young birds. Ostriches are becoming more and valuable because each and every part can be used. It is however expensive to rear ostriches on a large scale.

Ostrich farming in Namibia peaked at the end of the 1990s and collapsed in 2002 after prices for ostrich hides fell. Since then, occasional efforts have been made to revive the sector, without much success.

== Background ==
Ostriches are wild birds that occur naturally in Africa. There are well adapted to the dry conditions of Namibia and can go for long periods without water. Domesticated ostriches are normally smaller than the wild ones.

Ostriches are ready to breed when they are two to three years. Females always mature faster than males. The breeding season lasts from winter to mid summer. During this period both male and females display mating dances and behaviours. The females bore and ruffle their wings and the males do complicated dances and make loud booming noises. During mating the male mounts the female and inserts his penis into her cloaca facilitating the passage of sperm into the female. A few days after mating the male digs a hole in the ground for the female to lay her eggs in. The male and female alternate to sit on the eggs with the female doing duty in the day and the male in the night. Some birds can lay up to 100 eggs during the breeding season with an egg being laid every one or two days. During this period the male ostriches become very aggressive protecting both the female and the eggs.
