= Resolute Mining =

Australian mining company

Resolute Mining Limited
- Type: Public
- Traded as: ASX: RSG; LSE: RSG
- Industry: Mining
- Founded: June 8, 2001; 25 years ago
- Headquarters: Perth, Western Australia, Australia
- Key people: Andrew Wray (Chairman); Chris Eger (CEO); Dave Jackson (CFO)
- Website: www.rml.com.au

Resolute Mining Limited is an Australian mining corporation focused on mining operations in Africa. It is currently operating two gold mines: the Syama Gold Mine in Mali and the Mako Gold Mine in Senegal.

== History ==
On June 8, 2001, Resolute Mining Limited was incorporated. It was the successor to Resolute Limited. On June 22, Resolute Limited underwent corporate reorganization via a scheme of arrangement where 100% of Resolute Limited was acquired by Resolute Mining Limited. Resolute Limited was originally incorporated on June 22, 1983, under the name Samantha Exploration NL. Samantha Exploration NL changed its name to Samantha Gold NL in January 18, 1990. In 1994, Samantha Gold took over its parent company Resolute Resources NL. The company was then renamed to Resolute Samantha Limited on July 21, 1995. Resolute Samantha merged with Associated Gold Fields NL in January 1996 after a friendly takeover, acquiring its Obotan mine. In November 1996, Resolute Samantha would rename itself to Resolute Limited.

In January 2004, Resolute Mining bought the Ravenswood Gold mine from Xstrata for US$45 million. In July 2004, Resolute bought the Syama Gold Mine in Mali from Randgold Resources for US$6 million. In December 2013, Resolute Mining bought the Bibiani gold project in Ghana from Noble Mineral Resources, taking full ownership of the project in 2014, after approval from government of Ghana. Resolute Mining divested its remaining assets and interests in Tanzania in 2015, following the closure of its Golden Pride Gold Mine in 2013. In 2019, Resolute Mining acquired Toro Gold, and its Mako Gold Mine in Senegal, for US$305 million. In 2020, Resolute sold the Ravenswood Gold mine to a private equity firm, EMR Capital Management, and Singapore-based mining company, Golden Energy and Resources. With the sale of Ravenswood, Resolute's remaining mines were now only in Africa. Resolute also attempted to sell the Bibiani Gold Mine to China-based Chifeng Jilong Gold Mining for US$105 million. However, the deal was cancelled by Chifeng Jilong after the government of Ghana cancelled Resolute's lease for the Bibiani mine in 2021. Bibiani would be sold in August of that year to Canada-based Asante Gold for US$90 million.

On November 8, 2024, the Malian government detained three executives of Resolute Mining, including its chief executive officer, Terry Holohan. The government of Mali alleged that Resolute Mining owed the government 100 billion CFA francs in back taxes. The employees had been in the Malian capital of Bamako, to meet with representatives of the Malian government to come to a resolution. Following the detention of Resolute's employees, the Australian Securities Exchange halted the trading of Resolute's shares, as requested by Resolute. On November 18, Resolute agreed to pay the military government the demanded money. On November 21, Resolute said all three employees has been released and were 'safe and well'.

== Operations ==
=== Current ===
- Syama Gold Mine, Mali
- Mako Gold Mine, Senegal

=== Former ===
- Golden Pride Gold Mine, Tanzania
- Obotan Gold Mine, Ghana
- Ravenswood Gold Mine, Australia
- Bibiani Gold Mine, Ghana
