= Otjiwarongo =

- City
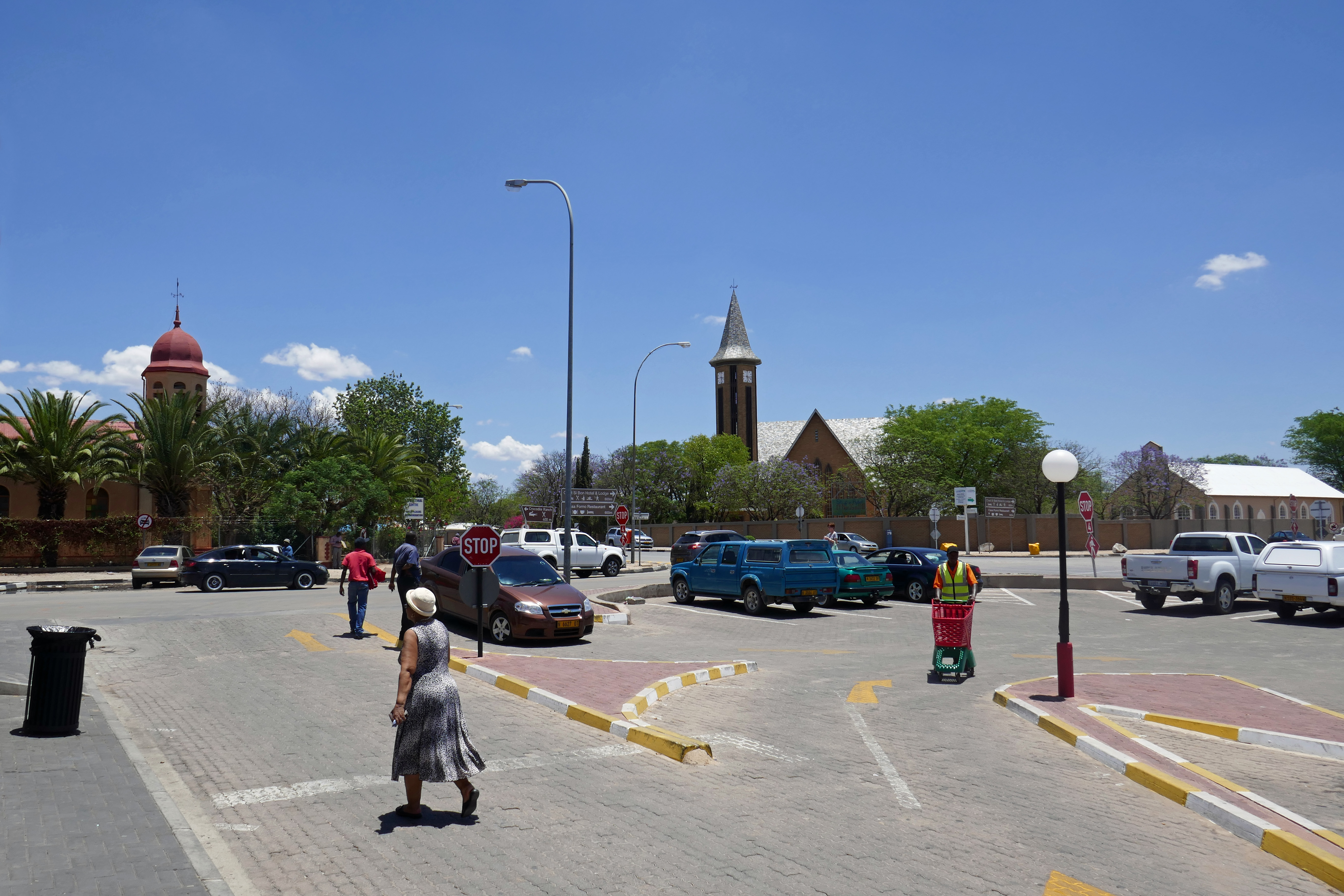
- Otjiwarongo in 2016

- Coat of arms
- Nicknames: OTT, OT
- Motto: Gradatim
- Location in Namibia
- Coordinates: 20°27′51″S 16°39′10″E
- Country: Namibia
- Region: Otjozondjupa Region
- Constituency: Otjiwarongo Constituency
- Established: 1906

Government
  - Type: Municipal
  - Mayor: Gottlieb Shivute (SWAPO)
  - Deputy Mayor: Julienda Kampungu (SWAPO)

Population (2023 census)
  - Total: 49,022
- Time zone: UTC+2 (SAST)
- Area code: 067
- Climate: BSh
- Website: www.otjimun.org.na

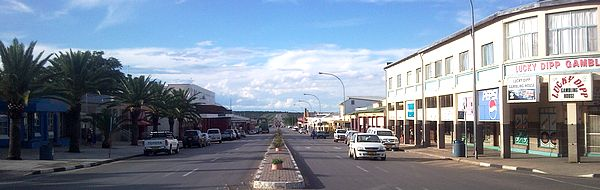
The Central Business District of Otjiwarongo

Otjiwarongo (Herero for "beautiful place") is a city of 49,000 inhabitants in Namibia. It is the capital of Otjozondjupa Region, and it also houses the constituency office of the Otjiwarongo electoral constituency.

Otjiwarongo is located in north-central Namibia on the B1 road and the TransNamib railway, serving as a transport hub connective Windhoek, the "Golden Triangle" (Otavi, Tsumeb and Grootfontein), and Etosha National Park. It is the largest commercial center in the Otjozondjupa Region. The town features commercial infrastructure, including supermarkets, financial institutions, and accommodations, and is surrounded by several private game farms and nature reserves.

Otjiwarongo is one of Namibia's towns with a large population of German-speaking people. German influence is also evident in its Germanic buildings. The school "Donatus School Otjiwarongo" (D.S.O.) was once known as "Deutsche Schule Otjiwarongo".

== History ==
The San and Damaras were the first settlers of the area, the Damaras from the Geio-Daman clan lived in the area from as early as 1390. The Damara also named the city ǂKhanubes. German Namibians first settled in Otjiwarongo in 1900. A bloody war was fought in the area between the Hereros and the Germans in 1904 where many of the Herero people died. This happened sometime before Otjiwarongo was established as an administration point for the Germans and officially became a town. A narrow-gauge railway was built from Swakopmund on the coast, to the Otavi copper mine which helped Otjiwarongo become a prosperous agricultural centre. The three tribes where separated like in many of Namibia's towns, where each lived in a separate neighbourhood: Ovambo Location, Damara Location and Herero Location respectively. The three locations together made up the suburb of Orwetoveni.

Historical population
Year	Pop.	±% p.a.
2001	19,614	—
2011	28,249	+3.72%
2023	49,022	+4.70%

== Economy and infrastructure ==
=== Mining ===
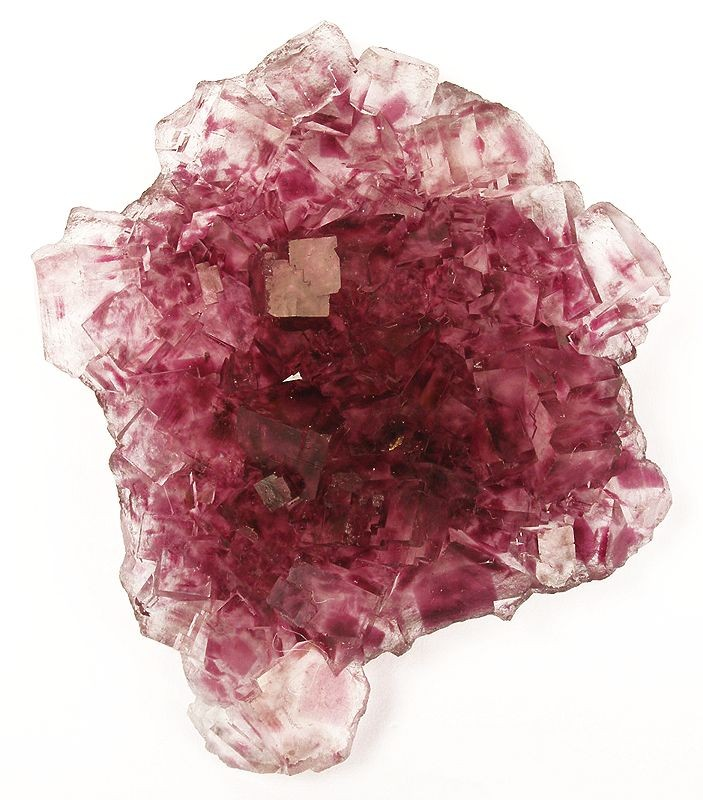
Pink fluorite specimen from the Okorusu Mine near Otjiwarongo. Size: 6.4 x 6.0 x 1.1 cm.

Otjiwarongo is one of Namibia's mining towns. Mining contributes about 20% of the town's economy. B2Gold mine, an open-pit gold mine established in 2014 and owned by B2Gold, is located approximately 70 km (43 mi) northwest of town. 48 km (30 mi) to the north there is the Okorusu fluorspar mine, a well-known source of fluorite specimens for mineral collectors. The mine is a potential resource for rare-earth elements.

=== Health facilities ===
Otjiwarongo District State Hospital is the biggest hospital in the town, it is mostly used by the middle and low income residents. The private hospital, Mediclinic Otjiwarongo, serves the local and surrounding communities, as well as international tourists.

=== Tourism ===
The main interest for tourists is Otjiwarongo's proximity to the Waterberg Plateau Park. Otjiwarongo is home to the Cheetah Conservation Fund, an internationally recognized organization dedicated to ensuring the long-term survival of the cheetah through research, conservation and education. Also about 80 km from Otjiwarongo is Okonjima, the home of the Africat Foundation, a cheetah and leopard rehabilitation centre.

On the edge of town is the Crocodile Ranch, one of the few captive breeding programmes for the Nile Crocodile that has been registered with CITES.

Built 15 km outside of town, the Omatjenne Dam provides artificial recharge of local groundwater.

=== Transport ===
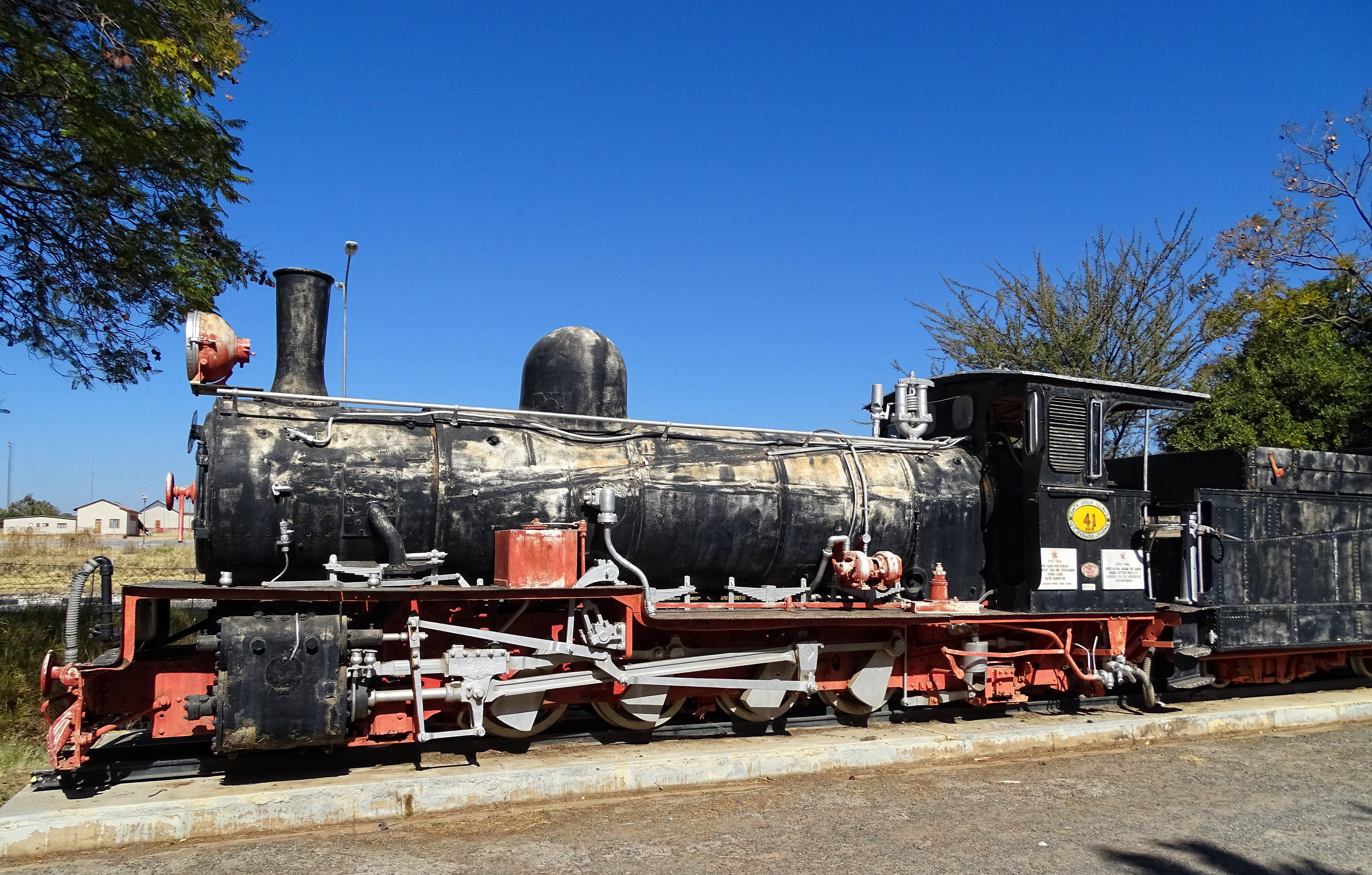
German Class Hd Locomotive no. 41 plinthed at Otjiwarongo railway station

Otjiwarongo has a well-developed road network. It is situated at the junction of the national road B1 that passes north–south through all of Namibia, the C38 to Outjo and further into Kunene Region in Namibia's north-west, and the C33 to Karibib, connecting the coastal towns of Swakopmund and Walvis Bay. Roads in town are likewise well-maintained, making Otjiwarongo one of the few Namibian towns that has tarred roads even in the townships.

Otjiwarongo is connected to the national railway grid, run by TransNamib. Otjiwarongo railway station is situated downtown, connecting Otavi and the junction at Kranzberg, and branching off to Outjo. In front of the railway station stands the historic Locomotive No 41, originally brought from Germany to haul ore between Tsumeb and the port at Swakopmund.

The town has an airstrip, Otjiwarongo Airport. There are plans to develop an international airport.

== Politics ==
Otjiwarongo is governed by a municipal council that currently has seven seats.

The 2015 local authority election was won by SWAPO which gained five seats and 3,901 votes. One seat each went to the Democratic Turnhalle Alliance (DTA, 454 votes) and the United Democratic Front (UDF, 442 votes). SWAPO also won the 2020 local authority election. It obtained 3,128 votes and gained four seats. One seat each went to Independent Patriots for Change (IPC, an opposition party formed in August 2020, 1,208 votes), Popular Democratic Movement (PDM, the new name of the DTA, 537 votes) and Landless People's Movement (LPM, an opposition party formed in 2016, 488 votes).

== Education ==
There are about 15 schools in Otjiwarongo, three private schools and twelve public schools. All schools final exams for grade 10 and 12 are regulated by the Ministry of Education, Arts & Culture. The schools of Otjiwarongo attract more and more non-resident students. The town also has a community library that caters for reading needs of the towns residents.

There are a number of institution for higher education in the town, as well as the MTI and COSDEC vocational training centres and a convent. The University of Namibia and the Namibia University of Science and Technology had plans to build satellite campuses in the town. The two institutions already have their regional centres in the town where distance students interact with the two institutions respectively.

=== Public Schools ===
- Karundu Primary School
- Karundu Junior Secondary School
- Orwetoveni Primary School
- Rogate Primary School
- Spes Bona Primary School
- Vooruit Primary School
- Donatus School Otjiwarongo (until 1995 Deutsche Schule Otjiwarongo)
- Otjiwarongo Secondary School
- Monica Geingos Secondary School
- Paresis Secondary School
- Tsaraxa-Aibes Combined School

=== Private Schools ===
- Privatschule Otjiwarongo
- Otjiwarongo Christian Primary
- Edugate Academy

Previously the German school Regierungsschule Otjiwarongo was in the city.

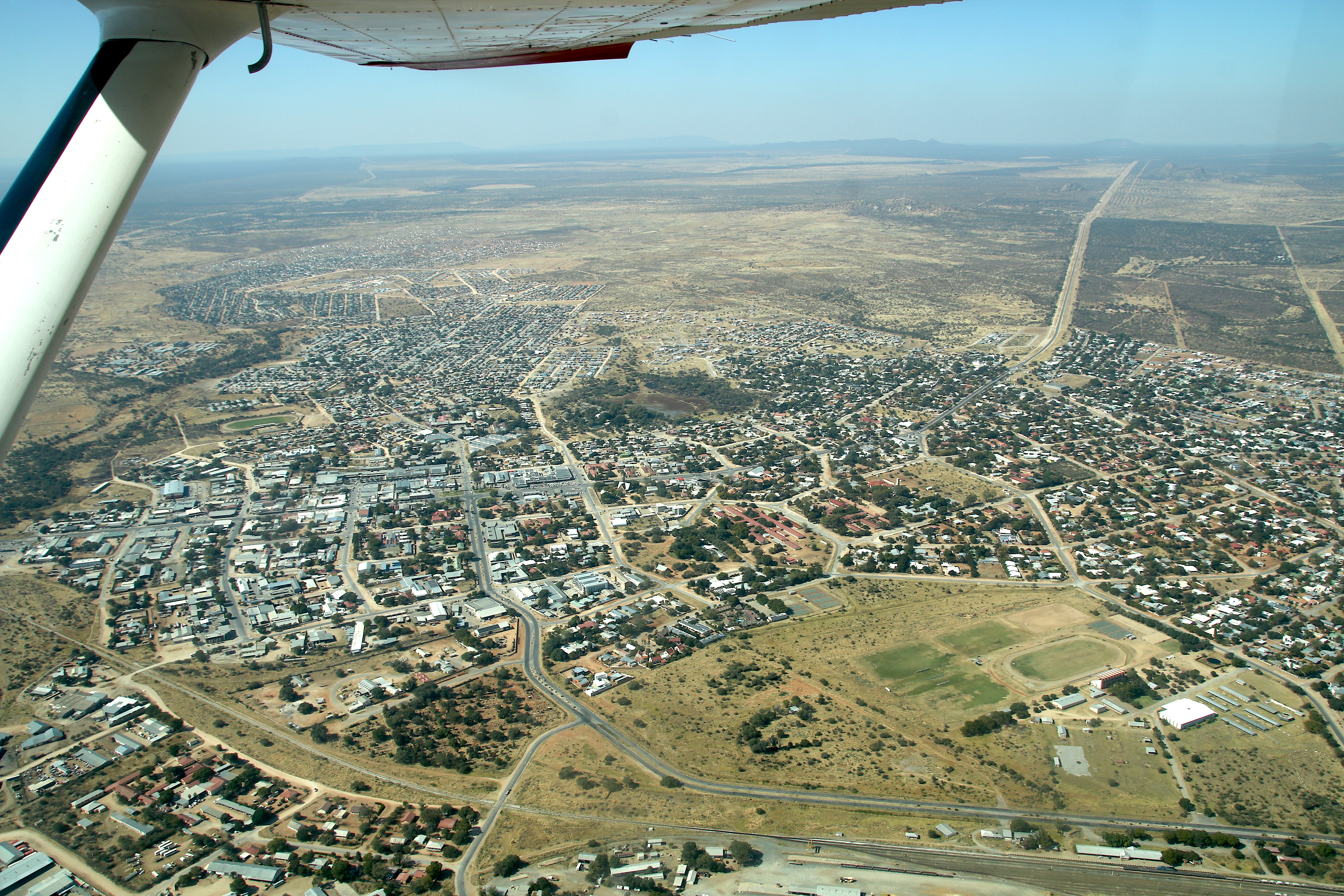
Aerial view of Otjiwarongo

== Language ==
About 90% of the town's residents speak and understand Afrikaans. About 75% speaks English and 35% German. Other languages include indigenous languages like Otjiherero, Khoe-Khoe and Oshiwambo.

== Sport ==
Mighty Gunners FC is the town's major football team. Life Fighters (Okahirona) also returned to the Namibia Premier League in 2017 after more than a decade. Mokati Stadium, the smaller of two stadia in Otjiwarongo, is located in Orwetoveni and it is the main football stadium in town. There are also grounds for basketball, netball, and tennis. The largest, Paresis Park also known as "The Show Ground", is located in the upper suburb of the town. It is the towns biggest sport ground and one of the biggest in Namibia. It has two soccer fields and two rugby fields. There are also grounds for hockey, tennis, netball, and cricket. The park is also used to host sport tournaments and business events such as the Otjiwarongo Trade Show. In 2011, it hosted the main event of the 21st Independence Celebrations of Namibia.

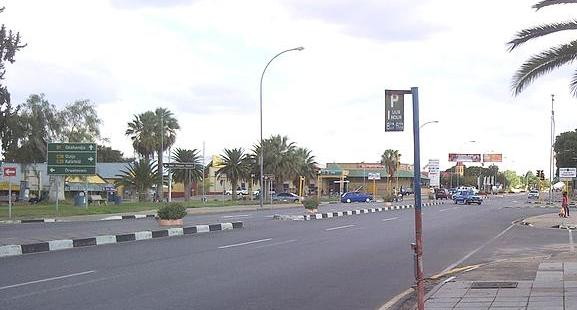
South Otjiwarongo CBD

Christian's church in central Otjiwarongo

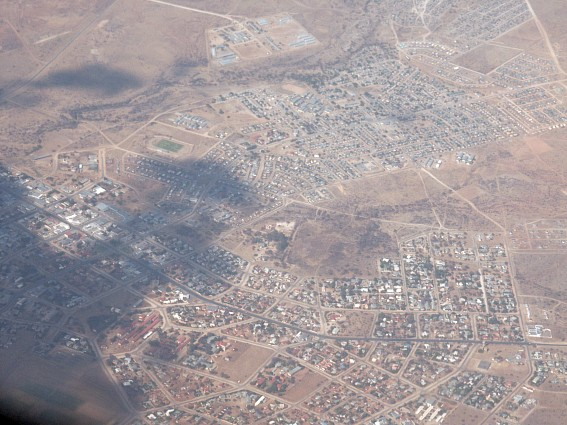
Aerial photo of Otjiwarongo showing mostly the South and Eastern part of the town

== Geography ==
=== Living conditions ===
In many of Otjiwarongo's townships residents live in shacks. In 2020 the city had a total of 6,251 of these informal housing structures, accommodating more than 50,000 inhabitants, more than the most recent (2011) census reported as total population figure.

=== Climate ===
Otjiwarongo has a semi-arid climate (BSh, according to the Köppen climate classification), with hot summers and mild winters. The average annual precipitation is 457 mm (18 in).

Climate data for Otjiwarongo
Month	Jan	Feb	Mar	Apr	May	Jun	Jul	Aug	Sep	Oct	Nov	Dec	Year
Mean daily maximum °C (°F)	32 (90)	30 (86)	29 (84)	29 (84)	27 (81)	24 (75)	24 (75)	27 (81)	31 (88)	32 (90)	33 (91)	34 (93)	29 (85)
Daily mean °C (°F)	24.5 (76.1)	23.5 (74.3)	22.5 (72.5)	21 (70)	18 (64)	15 (59)	15 (59)	17.5 (63.5)	22 (72)	23 (73)	24.5 (76.1)	25 (77)	21.0 (69.7)
Mean daily minimum °C (°F)	17 (63)	17 (63)	16 (61)	13 (55)	9 (48)	6 (43)	6 (43)	8 (46)	13 (55)	14 (57)	16 (61)	16 (61)	13 (55)
Average precipitation mm (inches)	100 (3.9)	121 (4.8)	80 (3.1)	41 (1.6)	5 (0.2)	0 (0)	0 (0)	1 (0.0)	2 (0.1)	14 (0.6)	39 (1.5)	54 (2.1)	457 (17.9)
Source: World Climate Guide.

== Twin cities ==
Dundas, Ontario, Canada Ensisheim, France Heusden, Netherlands Mochudi/Kgatleng, Botswana (Namibia) Katima Mulilo	Khorixas, Namibia Okakarara, Namibia Windhoek, Namibia Bethanie, Namibia Keetmanshoop, Namibia

== Notable residents ==
- Dan Craven (born 1983), racing cyclist
- Hage Geingob (1941-2024), first prime minister and third President of Namibia
- Otto Ipinge, politician, former mayor of the town, former regional councillor for Otjiwarongo Constituency, and current governor of Otjozondjupa Region
- Vekuii Rukoro (1954–2021), lawyer, businessman, and Paramount Chief of the Herero people
- Agnes Samaria (born 1972), middle-distance runner
- Calle Schlettwein (born 1954), politician, former government minister
