= B2Gold =

Canadian gold-mining company

B2Gold Corporation
- Type: Public
- Traded as: TSX: BTO; AMEX: BTG; S&P/TSX Composite Component
- Industry: Mining
- Founded: 2007
- Headquarters: Vancouver, British Columbia
- Key people: Michael Cinnamond (President and CEO, 2026 - current), Clive T. Johnson (Former President and CEO, 2007-2026), Kelvin Dushnisky (Executive Chair 2026 - current)
- Products: Gold
- Subsidiaries: TEAL Namibia (Barbados) Inc. Mali Mining Investments (British Virgin Islands) Limited; Central Asia Gold Limited (Bahamas)
- Website: Official Website

B2Gold Corporation is a Canadian mining company that owns and operates gold mines in Canada, Mali, Namibia and the Philippines. The company is headquartered in Vancouver, and was founded in 2007, and was then listed on the Toronto Stock Exchange, then later listed on the New York Stock Exchange and the Namibian Stock Exchange. The company was formed by several executives from Bema Gold following its acquisition by Kinross Gold. The company built itself up through mergers with several other mining companies, including Central Sun Mining, CGA Mining, Auryx Gold, Papillon Resources and Sabina Gold & Silver, to give it four operating mines and several exploration properties.

== History ==
B2Gold was founded in 2007 by Clive T. Johnson and other former executives at Bema Gold which was in the process of being acquired by Kinross Gold for $3.5 billion. The terms of the deal allowed the newly created B2Gold to take Bema Gold's exploration properties in Colombia and Russia. Their initial public offering in December 2007 on the Toronto Venture Exchange raised $100 million for exploration and valuation purposes. In 2008, the exploration company graduated to the Toronto Stock Exchange.

In 2009, the B2Gold became a gold producer with its acquisition of the TSX-listed, and financially distressed company, Central Sun Mining. This all-stock deal, estimated to be valued at $67 million, gave B2Gold its first two mines, El Limon and La Libertad both in Nicaragua. The company produced 21,200 ounces of gold in 2009 up to 157,885 ounces in 2012.

B2Gold added a third mine, in 2012, with its merger with ASX-listed CGA Mining. The deal gave B2Gold the Masbate mine in the Philippines and CGA Mining shareholders received 38% of the combined company. Around this time, in 2013, B2Gold also acquired Volta Resources in an all-stock deal worth US$63 million for its Burkina Faso exploration properties, and lost an exploration property in Rancho Grande (El Pavón), Nicaragua, due to community opposition. With three operating mines, B2Gold produced 366,000 ounces of gold in 2013 and 391,000 ounces in 2014.

B2Gold's fourth mine came from the development of the Otjikoto project, acquired in its 2011 merger with TSX-listed Auryx Gold which gave Auryx shareholders 10% of the combined company. the Otjikoto mine in Namibia achieved commercial production in February 2015. With the four mines, the company produced 493,265 ounces of gold in 2015 and 550,423 ounces in 2016.

Their fifth mine was developed from the Fekola property in Mali acquired with B2Gold's merger with ASX-listed Papillon Resources. The 2014 deal, with an estimated value of US$570 million, gave Papillon shareholders 26% of the combined company, and resulted in the Fekola mine beginning production in November 2017. The five mines resulted in the company producing approximately 960,000 ounces of gold in both 2018 and 2019. The company sold its assets in Nicaragua to Vancouver-based mineral exploration company Calibre Mining.

In May 2022, it was announced B2Gold had acquired the Australia-based gold exploration company, Oklo Resources for US$64 million.

In April 2023, B2Gold acquired all of the issued and outstanding common shares of Sabina Gold & Silver Corp., resulting in the acquisition of Sabina's 100% owned Back River Gold District located in Nunavut, Canada. The Back River Gold District consists of five mineral claims blocks along an 80-kilometre belt. Its most advanced project, Goose Mine, completed construction and achieved commercial production in October 2025. B2Gold’s management team has northern construction expertise and experience to develop the significant gold resource endowment at the Back River Gold District into a long service life mining complex.

== Operations ==
As of 2026, B2Gold has four operating mines:

- Fekola mine, located in Mali, near the Senegal border, is the second mine B2Gold developed itself, after having acquired the project from Papillon Resources. During that development phase, several B2Gold executives were taken hostage during the 2015 Bamako hotel attack but rescued by the Malian military. It is the company's largest mine as it has been producing over 400,000 ounces of gold each year.
- Masbate mine, located in Aroroy, Masbate, the Philippines, came to B2Gold in the 2012 merger with CGA Mining. The open pit mine, which produces upwards of 200,000 ounces of gold annually, was subject to several killings of security guards and an employee in 2014-15.
- Otjikoto mine in Otjozondjupa, Namibia, is a combined open pit and underground mine that produces between 150,000 and 200,000 ounces of gold annually. Beginning production in 2015, it was the first mine B2Gold developed itself, and it is powered by its own solar power plant.
- Goose Mine, located in Nunavut, Canada began commercial production in October 2025.

=== Past operations ===
- La Libertad gold mine, located in Chontales, Nicaragua, was acquired by B2Gold with its merger with Central Sun Mining in 2009 and sold to Calibre Mining in 2019. It consisted of several open pits, along with an underground operation, whose expansive reach necessitated the relocation of a neighbourhood of La Libertad.
- El Limon mine, located on the border of León and Chinandega Departments in Nicaragua, was acquired in 2009 and sold 2019 along with the La Libertad mine. It was the site of protests that resulted in one death and 31 injuries, damage to the mine and temporary closure, in 2015, following the sacking of three workers. Producing between 40,000 and 50,000 ounces of gold a year, it was B2Gold smallest mine.
