= Otavi =

Otavi Otjitavi
- Town
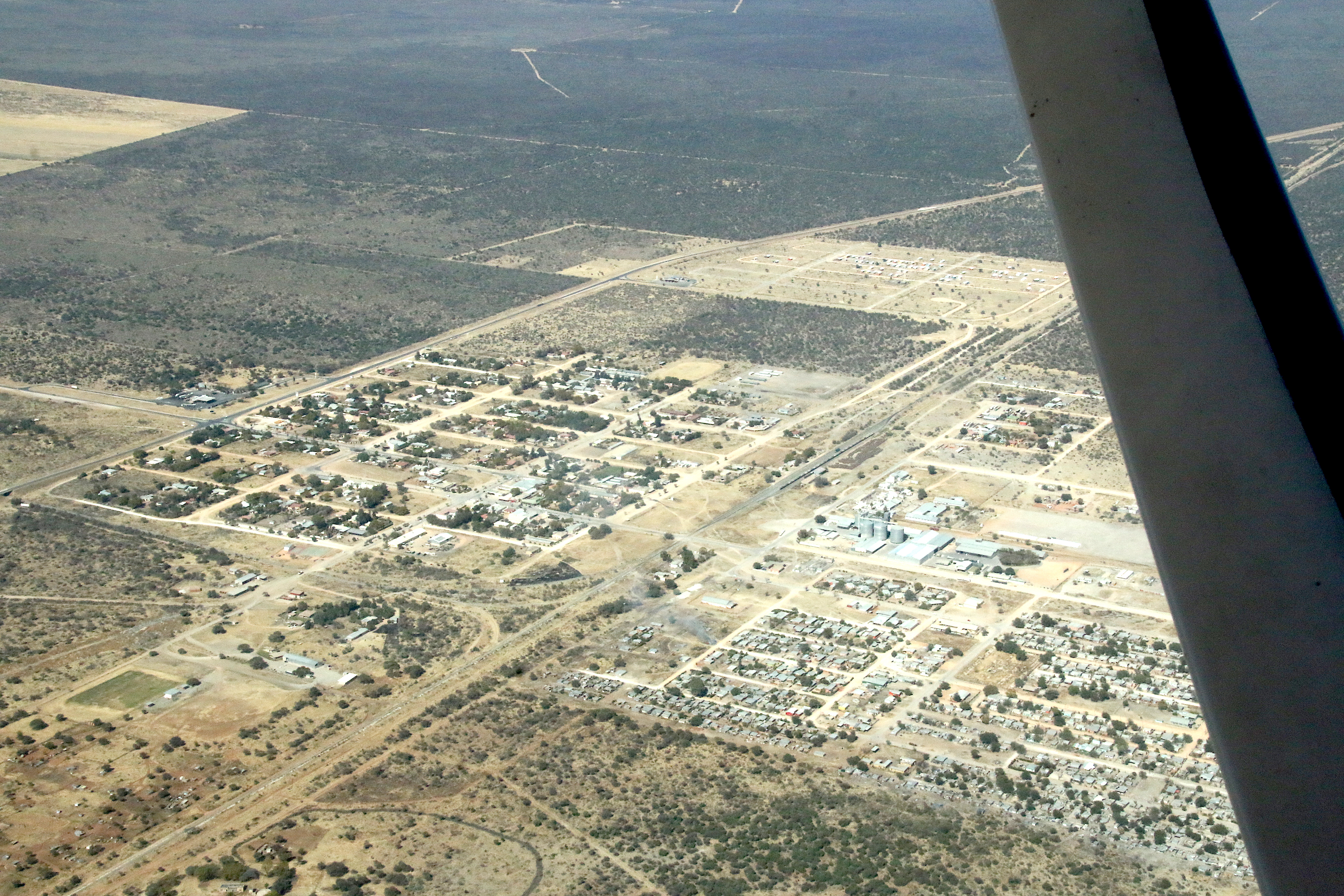
- Aerial view of Otavi (2018)

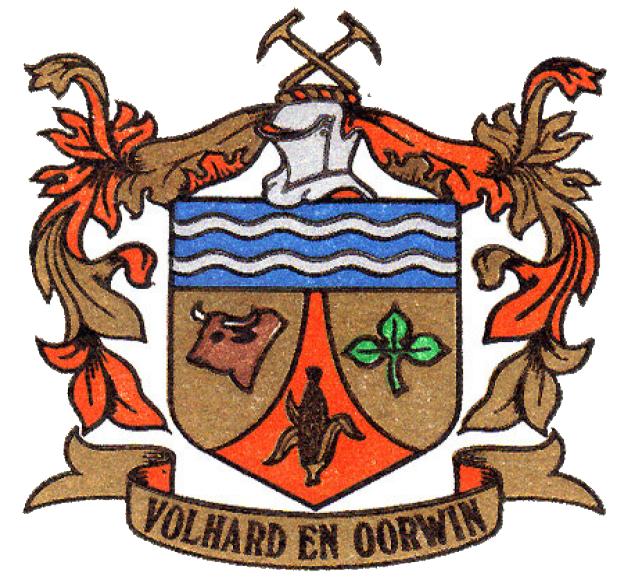
- Seal
- Nickname: otavio
- Motto: Volhard en Oorwin
- Location in Namibia
- Coordinates: 19°39′S 17°20′E
- Country: Namibia
- Region: Otjozondjupa Region
- Constituency: Otavi Constituency

Area
  - Total: 165 sq mi (428 km^{2})

Population (2023 census)
  - Total: 10,756
  - Density: 65.1/sq mi (25.1/km^{2})
- Time zone: UTC+2 (SAST)
- Climate: BSh

Otavi is a town with 10,000 inhabitants in the Otjozondjupa Region of Namibia. Situated 360 km north of Windhoek, it is the district capital of the Otavi electoral constituency.

== Geography ==
The towns of Otavi, Tsumeb (to the north) and Grootfontein (to the northeast) define an area known as the "Otavi Triangle", also known as the Otavi Mountainland. This geographical region is sometimes referred to as the "Golden Triangle", or as the "maize Triangle", owing to the cultivation of maize in the area. The three towns that define the triangle are roughly 60 km from each other.

Most of the area is dolomitic (Precambrian) and the district was renowned for its mineral wealth in the past. Most of the deposits have now been exhausted. Elefantenberg (elephant mountain), a mountain 1,624 meters above sea level, is located about 7 km south of Otavi.

== Economy and infrastructure ==
Much of the town's economy relies on the two grocery stores, a mill, two banks, two gas stations, and many surrounding game/cattle farms, as well as a handful of other small business. The owners of most of these businesses are Afrikaners (white Africans or Boer, ultimately Dutch in heritage) or Germans.

Due to financial mismanagement, Otavi lost its town status in 2004 and was downgraded to "village". After revenue picked up again, town status was reinstated in November 2010. With the foundation of the Ohorongo Cement factory and the Otjikoto mine, operated by B2Gold, business and employment rate has been recovering. A steel manufacturing plant is also being developed. The project will cost $201 million and it's expected to produce 100,000 tons of steel.

=== Transport ===
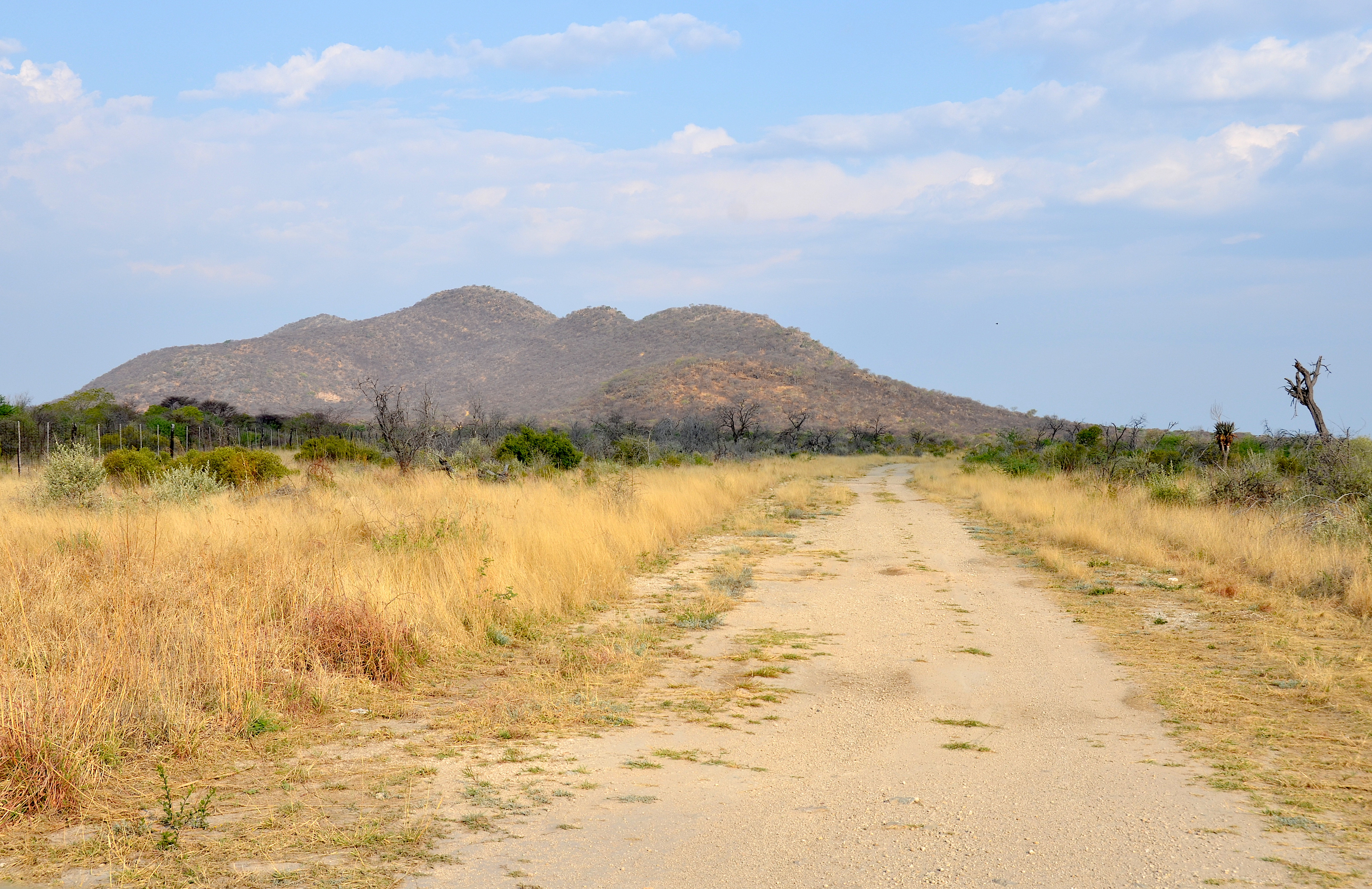
Elefantenberg south of Otavi next to the B1 (2014)

Otavi is a railway junction where the line from Windhoek to Oshikango branches off the line to Grootfontein. The town is served by the Otavi railway station.

Otavi is situated next to the B1 - the longest National Road, running the length of Namibia - about 370 km from the capital, Windhoek.

There is also a municipal pool from the Apartheid area on hertzhog avenue

== History ==
On July 1, 1915, the German Army was defeated at Otavi by South African troops; on July 9 they surrendered nearby and signed the Khorab Peace Treaty. A public monument to this event was erected in 1973 outside of Otavi.

During the South African Border War SWASpes, the 1 SWA Specialist Unit was based here, moving from Oshivelo in 1979. The unit consisted of horse mounted troops, dog trackers, human trackers and motorcycle units to hunt insurgents.

== Politics ==
Otavi was proclaimed town in 2010. Since then it is governed by a town council that currently has seven seats.

The 2015 local authority election was won by SWAPO which gained six seats and 957 votes. The remaining seat went to the Democratic Turnhalle Alliance (DTA) which gained 79 votes. SWAPO also won the 2020 local authority election. It obtained 1,092 votes and gained five seats. One seat each went to the Independent Patriots for Change (IPC, an opposition party formed in August 2020) and to the Landless People's Movement (LPM, an opposition party formed in 2016) with 260 and 167 votes, respectively.

== Education ==
Otavi has three schools, namely: Otavi Primary School, Khorab Senior Secondary School and the Deutsche Privatschule Otavi-Namibia. Previously the German Regierungsschule Otavi (Government School Otavi) was situated in Otavi.

== See also ==
- Transport in Namibia
