= Otjozondjupa Region =

Administrative region of Namibia

Coordinates: 19°15′S 17°42′E

- Region
- Location of the Otjozondjupa Region in Namibia
- Country: Namibia
- Capital: Otjiwarongo

Government
  - Governor: John Julius ǁKhamuseb

Area
  - Total: 105,460 km^{2} (40,720 sq mi)

Population (2023 census)
  - Total: 220,811
  - Density: 2.0938/km^{2} (5.4229/sq mi)
- Time zone: UTC+2 (CAT)
- HDI (2017): 0.648 medium · 6th
- Website: otjozondjuparc.gov.na

Otjozondjupa is one of the fourteen regions of Namibia. Its capital is Otjiwarongo. The region further contains the municipalities of Okahandja and Grootfontein and the towns Okakarara and Otavi. As of 2020, Otjozondjupa had 97,945 registered voters.

== Geography ==
A landmark within this region is the Waterberg Plateau Park. Twenty four kilometres west of Grootfontein lies the huge Hoba meteorite. At over 60 tons, it is the largest known meteorite on Earth, as well as the largest naturally occurring mass of iron known to exist on the planet's surface.

In the east, Otjozondjupa borders the North-West District of Botswana. Domestically, it borders more regions than any other region of Namibia:

- Omaheke – southeast
- Khomas – south
- Erongo – southwest
- Kunene – northwest
- Oshikoto – north
- Kavango – northeast

== Economy and infrastructure ==
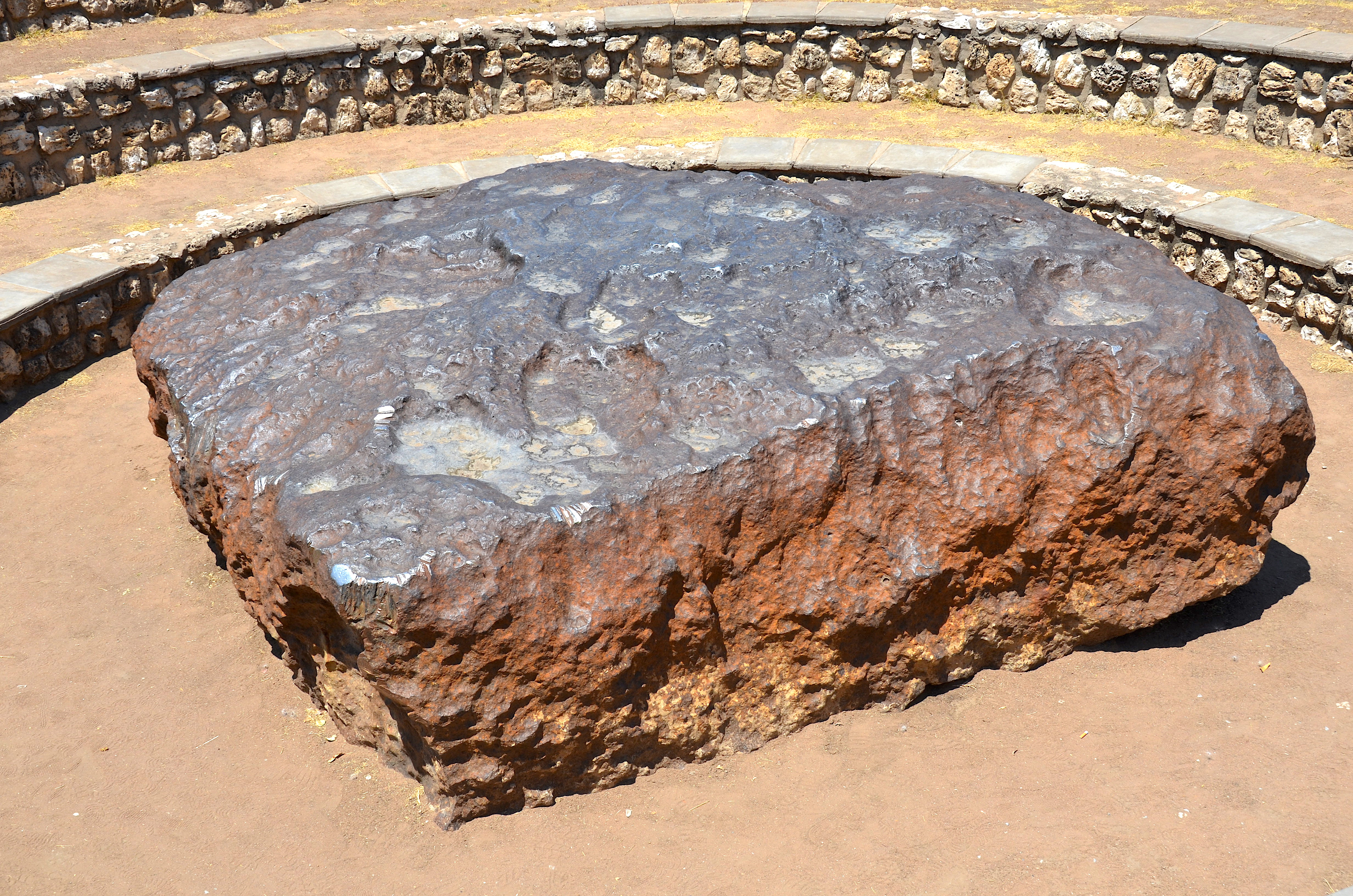
Hoba meteorite near Grootfontein (2014)

Otjiwarongo, Grootfontein, Otavi, and Okahandja are linked by rail and by the main B1 and B8 trunk roads running from south to north. Communication systems in these areas are also of a high standard.

The farming activities of Okahandja and Otjiwarongo are homogeneous as these parts are well known for cattle farming. The Otavi and Grootfontein districts, and to a lesser extent also Otjiwarongo, are the granary of Namibia. The region also has a great potential to establish industries connected with such farming activities and by-products of it. It further has the advantage of combining communal and commercial farming in the same region.

According to the 2012 Namibia Labour Force Survey, unemployment in the region is 25.3%. Otjozondjupa has 72 schools with a total of 36,284 pupils.

== Politics ==
Otjozondjupa constituencies (2014)

The region comprises seven constituencies:

- Grootfontein
- Okahandja
- Okakarara
- Omatako
- Otavi
- Otjiwarongo
- Tsumkwe

=== Regional elections ===
Otjozondjupa is one of a few Namibian regions where there is considerable opposition support. In the 2004 regional election for the National Assembly of Namibia, the South West Africa People's Organization (SWAPO) won in six of the seven constituencies, Okakarara was won by National Unity Democratic Organisation (NUDO).

The 2015 regional elections saw SWAPO obtain 58.4% of the votes cast (2010: 48.9%) and win five of the seven constituencies. NUDO won two, Okakarara and Omatako. The same two constituencies went to NUDO again in the 2020 regional election. SWAPO's support dropped to 44.3%, but it won the other five constituencies again. NUDO overall obtained 14.1% of the popular vote in this election. The upstart Independent Patriots for Change (IPC), an opposition party formed in August 2020, obtained 12.9% overall, and the Popular Democratic Movement (PDM) got 11.9%, but both did not get close to winning any single constituency.

=== Governors ===
- Rapama Kamehozu (2011–2012)
- Otto Ipinge (2015–2020)
- James Uerikua (2020–2025)
- John Julius ǁKhamuseb (2025 – current)

== Demographics ==
As of 2023, Otjozondjupa is home to 220,811 inhabitants. In the general population, men outnumber women, with 105 males per 100 females. The population is majority urban, with 62.9% living in urban settlements. The population density is 2.1 people per km^{2}. 5.6% of residents are not Namibian citizens. There are 58,237 private households, averaging 3.6 members. The population is growing at an annual rate of 3.6%, with a fertility rate of 4.1 children per woman. 13.9% is under 5, 22% 5-14, 34.9% 15-34, 23.5% 35-59, and 5.7% over 60.

=== Marriage status ===
29.9% of the adult population is married, either with certificate (14.1%), traditionally (6.4%), in a consensual union (5.5%), divorced (1.4%), or widowed (1.9%). 3.2% of the current youth population married before age 18.

=== Education and employment ===
The literacy rate has remained steady since 2011 at 83%. 15.8% percent of pre-primary youth attend Early Childhood Development (ECD) programs. The maximum level of educational attainment is mostly primary (46.5%), with only 22.7% pursuing secondary education and 10.5% pursuing tertiary education. 14.9% has no educational attainment. 57.8% of inhabitants earn a wage or salary as their primary source of income, 10.4% receive an old-age pension, 4.7% rely on farming, and 7.5% are involved in non-farming business.

=== Technology access ===
As of 2023, 93.8% of the population has access to safe drinking water, compared to 94.6% in 2011. 62.8% have access to toilet facilities, a 1.7% increase. The proportion of the population that has access to electricity for lighting has risen from 56% to 57.9% since 2011. Access to the internet has risen to 29.5%, while cellphone ownership is relatively similar at 52.2% (from 54.9% in 2011).
