= Climate change in Lesotho =

Emissions, impacts and responses of the Lesotho related to climate change

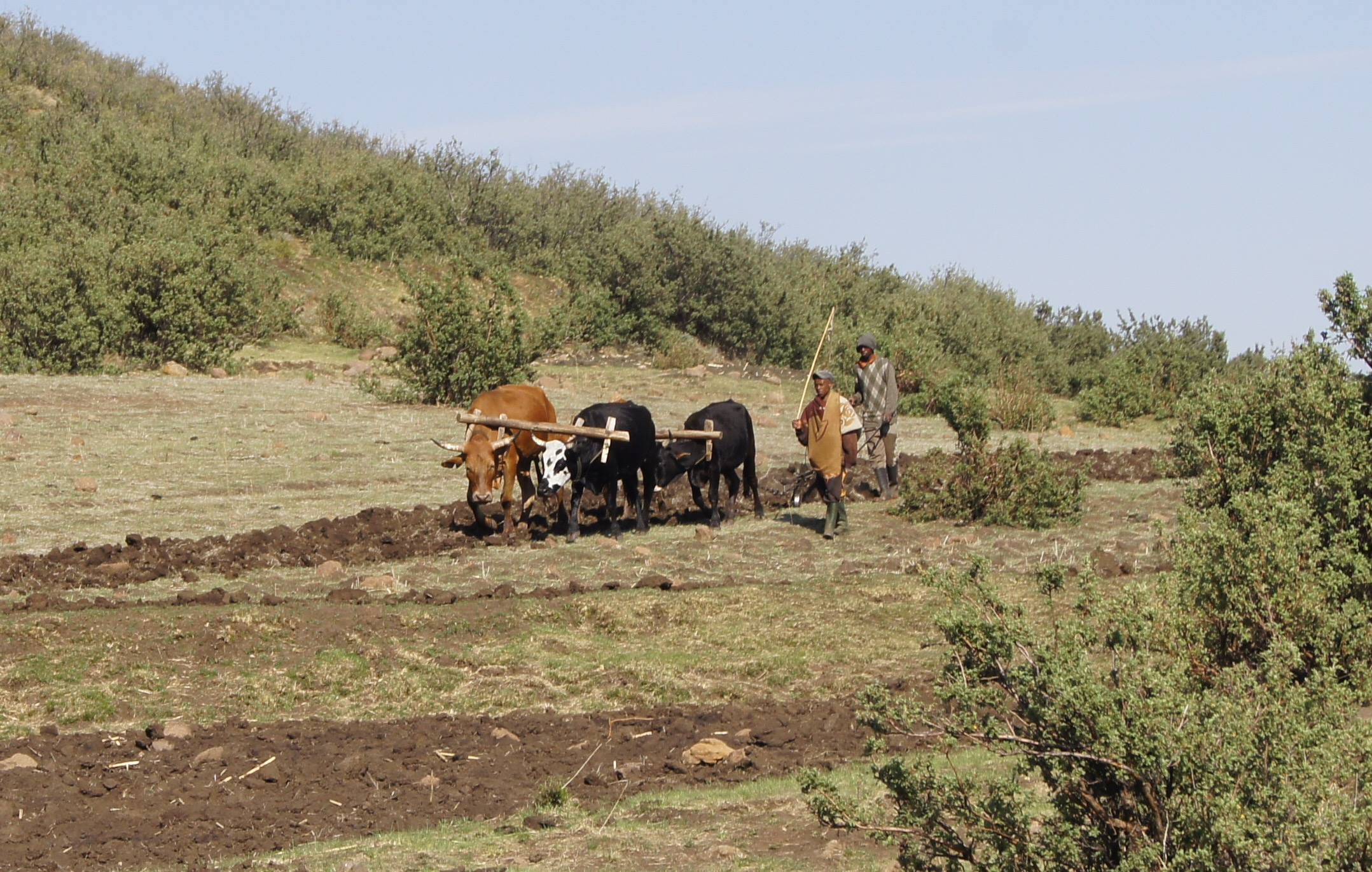
Traditional ploughing

Lesotho is a country in southern Africa that is already experiencing the negative effects of climate change, including increased frequency of extreme weather, such as droughts, increased rates of soil erosion and desertification, and reduced soil fertility. Lesotho is a landlocked country that is particularly vulnerable to the negative impacts of climate variability and changes in water and food security, as well as adverse conditions to health, human settlements, and the energy sector.

The high aridity in Lesotho, coupled with periods of severe drought, exacerbates the loss of biological diversity, degradation of rangelands, and decreased crop and animal productivity due to desertification. These challenges contribute to the country's rising vulnerability.

== Greenhouse gas emissions ==
Climate Trace has estimated greenhouse gas emissions for Lesotho in 2022 at 2.62 million tones, with about half from agriculture, As the population of Lesotho is about 2.2 million this is about 1.2 tones a year per person, which is well below the world average of about 6.5 tones. The official estimate for 2017 totaled 5.66 million tones, which is also well below the world average per person.

Fossil Carbon Dioxide (CO2) emissions of Lesotho.
Year	Fossil CO2 emissions (tons)	CO2 emissions change	CO2 emissions per capita	Population	Pop. change	Share of World's CO2 emissions
2022	779,000	9.18%	0.34	2,286,110	1.09%	0.0020%
2021	713,490	0.14%	0.32	2,261,542	1.15%	0.0019%
2020	712,480	1.46%	0.32	2,235,727	1.19%	0.0020%
2019	702,200	4.43%	0.32	2,209,405	1.18%	0.0019%
2018	672,400	−1.04%	0.31	2,183,603	1.23%	0.0018%
2017	679,470	7%	0.31	2,157,110	1.25%	0.0018%
2016	635,010	6.68%	0.3	2,130,422	1.23%	0.0018%
2015	595,220	−1.32%	0.28	2,104,611	1.18%	0.0016%
2014	603,180	4.28%	0.29	2,080,089	1.15%	0.0017%
2013	578,440	−0.03%	0.28	2,056,504	1.09%	0.0016%
2012	578,640	6.8%	0.28	2,034,354	1.01%	0.0016%
2011	541,810	2.73%	0.27	2,014,009	0.89%	0.0016%
2010	527,430	3.84%	0.26	1,996,251	0.78%	0.0016%
2009	507,910	15.04%	0.26	1,980,883	0.73%	0.0016%
2008	441,520	−18.37%	0.22	1,966,541	0.68%	0.0014%
2007	540,910	28.92%	0.28	1,953,268	0.42%	0.0017%
2006	419,560	2.2%	0.22	1,945,063	−0.41%	0.0014%
2005	410,540	−0.04%	0.21	1,953,076	−0.92%	0.0014%
2004	410,700	4.98%	0.21	1,971,129	−0.7%	0.0014%
2003	391,200	1.18%	0.2	1,985,059	−0.48%	0.0014%
2002	386,650	4.69%	0.19	1,994,679	−0.31%	0.0015%
2001	369,330	1.91%	0.18	2,000,853	−0.15%	0.0014%
2000	362,420	173.42%	0.18	2,003,913	0.03%	0.0014%
1999	132,550	1.88%	0.07	2,003,234	0.26%	0.00053%
1998	130,110	−1.98%	0.07	1,998,049	0.5%	0.00053%
1997	132,740	−0.09%	0.07	1,988,130	0.8%	0.00054%
1996	132,860	4.24%	0.07	1,972,418	1.08%	0.00055%
1995	127,460	1.66%	0.07	1,951,437	1.23%	0.00054%
1994	125,380	9.32%	0.07	1,927,707	1.36%	0.00055%
1993	114,690	−3.69%	0.06	1,901,793	1.52%	0.00051%
1992	119,080	−14.89%	0.06	1,873,274	1.68%	0.00053%
1991	139,910	26.42%	0.08	1,842,379	1.81%	0.00062%
1990	110,670	−20.8%	0.06	1,809,696	1.93%	0.00049%
1989	139,730	33.24%	0.08	1,775,436	2.05%	0.00063%
1988	104,870	−36.28%	0.06	1,739,841	2.14%	0.00048%
1987	164,590	40.18%	0.1	1,703,390	2.24%	0.00078%
1986	117,410	8.72%	0.07	1,666,138	2.57%	0.00057%
1985	107,990	9.32%	0.07	1,624,379	2.87%	0.00053%
1984	98,780	−3.3%	0.06	1,578,986	2.9%	0.00050%
1983	102,150	9.33%	0.07	1,534,413	2.93%	0.00053%
1982	93,430	−6.96%	0.06	1,490,732	2.95%	0.00049%
1981	100,420	−4.12%	0.07	1,448,069	2.95%	0.00052%
1980	104,740	−1.74%	0.07	1,406,521	2.95%	0.00053%
1979	106,600	15.14%	0.08	1,366,169	2.93%	0.00053%
1978	92,580	1.65%	0.07	1,327,240	2.89%	0.00047%
1977	91,080	3.51%	0.07	1,289,967	2.93%	0.00048%

== Climatology ==
The country has cold winters and hot summers. The average temperature ranges from 0 °C to 30 °C, depending on the altitude. Lesotho is likely to become generally hotter and drier across projected future climates.

Köppen–Geiger present climate classification map for Lesotho

Köppen–Geiger future climate classification map for Lesotho

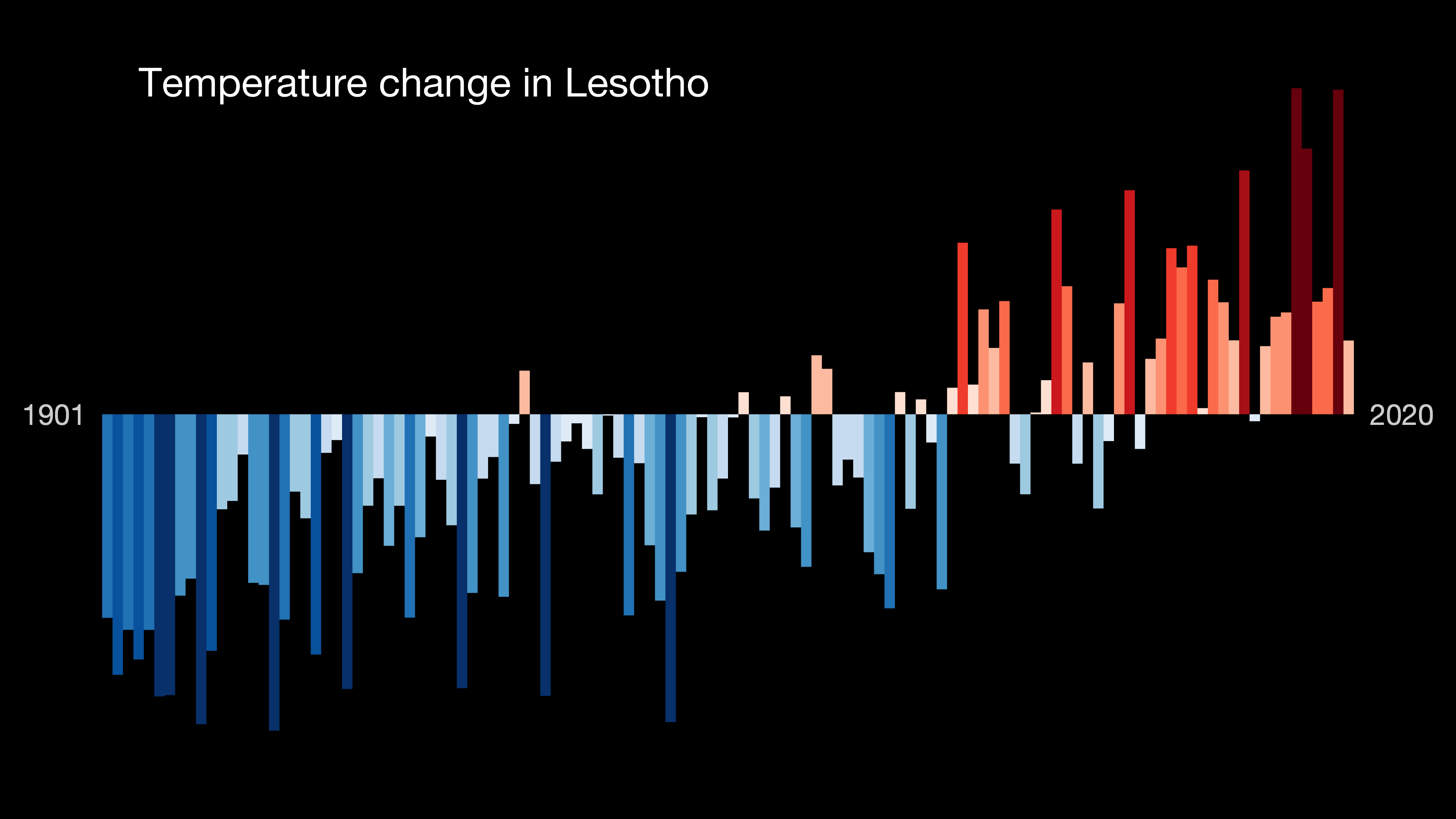
Temperature Bar Chart Africa-Lesotho--1901-2020--2021-07-13.

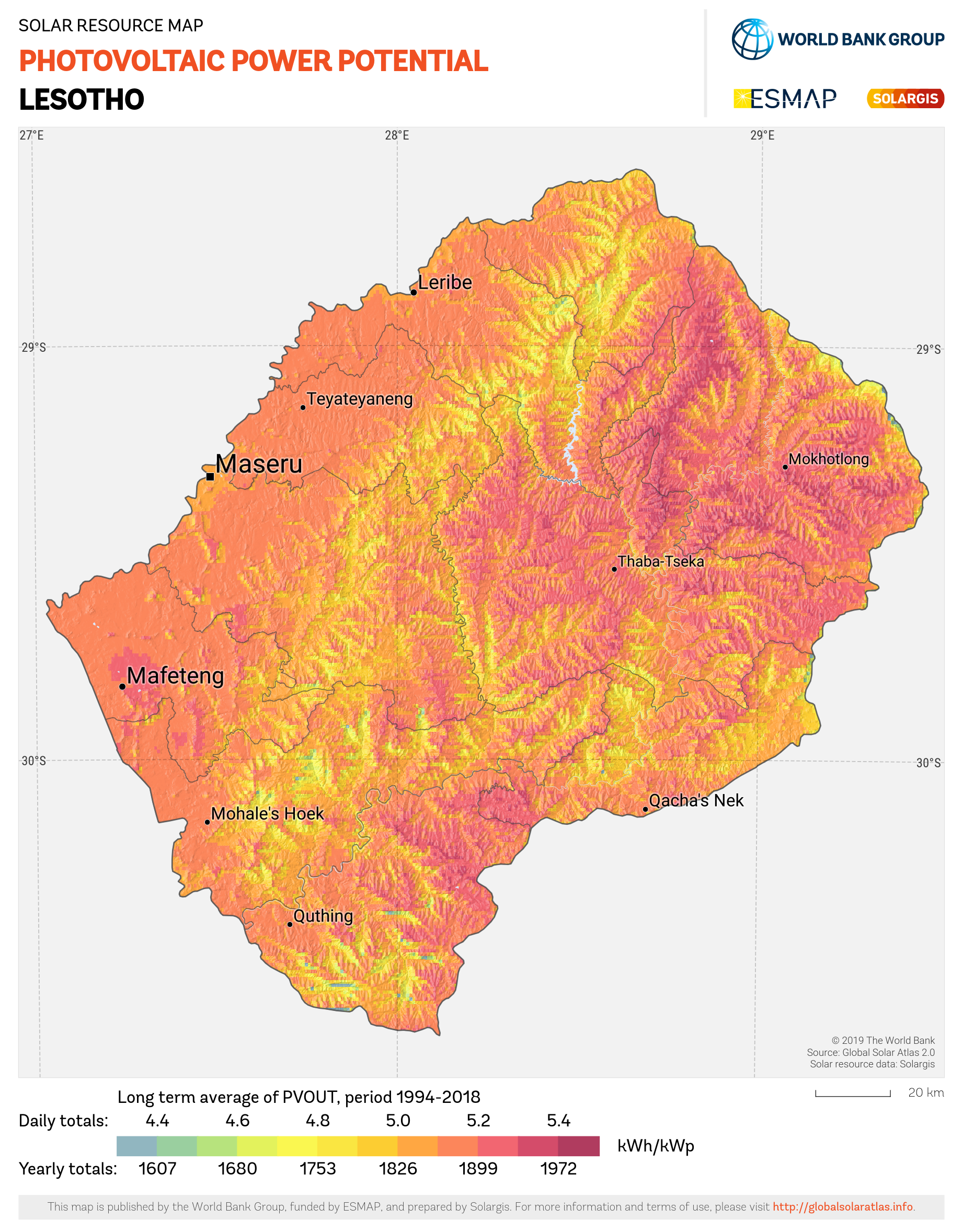
Lesotho PVOUT Photovoltaic-power-potential-map GlobalSolarAtlas World-Bank-Esmap-Solargis

== Impacts on key sectors ==
Lesotho’s key sectors such as agriculture, water, energy, and health are vulnerable to climate change.

=== Agriculture ===
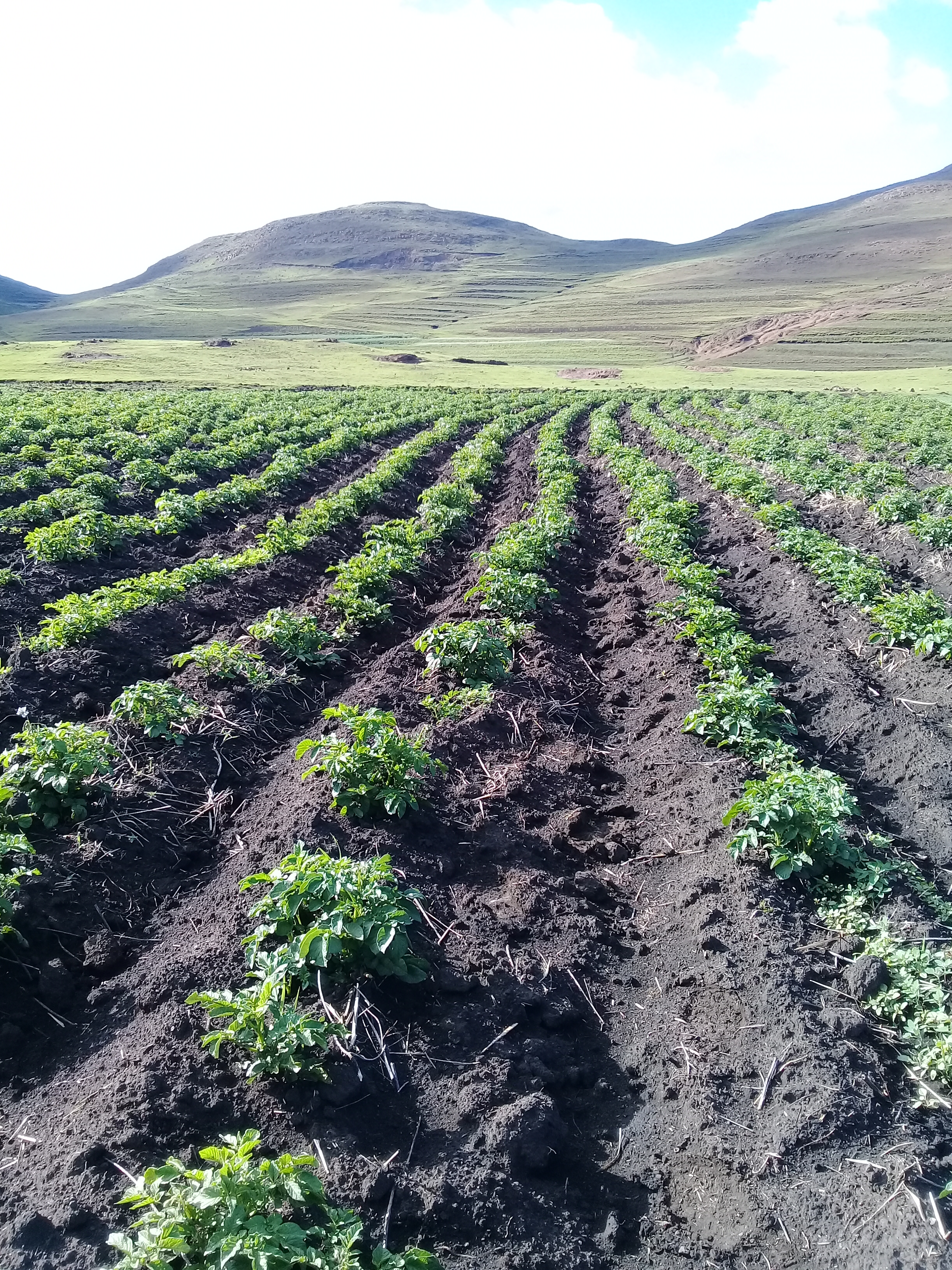
Potatoes

The agriculture sector is the backbone of Lesotho’s economy and is highly vulnerable to climate change. The sector is already facing climate vulnerabilities with drought, floods, pests, and extreme temperatures occurring more frequently. Food security in Lesotho has been called precarious. Only 30% of maize, which is the main staple food, is grown in the country. The predominantly rainfed agriculture makes Lesotho susceptible to the adverse effects of drought. To meet the domestic food demand, Lesotho relies on imports of maize from its neighboring country South Africa. The prices of maize in Lesotho are strongly influenced by the prices in South Africa. Given the proximity between the two countries, a drought affecting Lesotho is likely to have an impact on South Africa as well. This would lead to reduced production in both countries. This scenario has occurred in the past, such as in 2007 when the most severe drought ever recorded by satellites affected both Lesotho and South Africa simultaneously. Consequently, the drought resulted in crop failures in both countries, leading to a significant decline in maize exports to Lesotho.

=== Water ===
Lesotho’s water resources are highly vulnerable to climate change impacts. The country is already experiencing reduced water availability due to droughts and increased water demand due to population growth. The climate of Lesotho is characterized by the occurrence of periods of dryness and periods of rainfall over recorded history. These climatic fluctuations have had significant impacts on the environment. The impacts associated with dry periods include scarcity of food, famine, disease outbreaks, invasion by non-native plants and destructive insects, dust storms, and the initiation of erosion by rivers. The longest dry spell in the 200-year record took place between 1991 and 1995. Lesotho is projected to change in temperature and precipitation patterns, leading to drier and hotter conditions. The intensity and frequency of extreme events like floods and droughts are expected to increase, especially in the western and northern lowlands. Water resources will be negatively affected by reduced precipitation and increased temperature, resulting in higher evaporation rates, decreased runoff, and diminished groundwater replenishment. Rangeland conditions may deteriorate and ultimately be degraded by climate changes, impacting the quality of livestock and livestock products. The existing indigenous forests might transition into semi-arid types, while agricultural production will decline, leading to food shortages. Lesotho stands as the only nation in the world with all its land situated above 1000 meters. Completely enveloped by South Africa, it is located at the highest point of the Drakensberg escarpment on the eastern border of the South African plateau.

=== Energy ===
Lesotho’s energy sector is highly vulnerable to climate change impacts. The country is already experiencing reduced hydropower generation due to reduced water availability. More than 95% of electricity consumed in Lesotho is from hydro-power (MEMWA, 2013).

=== Health ===
Lesotho’s health sector is highly vulnerable to climate change impacts. The country is already experiencing an increased incidence of malaria and other vector-borne diseases due to increased temperatures and rainfall. The impacts related to periods of insufficient rainfall encompass scarcity of food, widespread famine, outbreaks of diseases, invasion by foreign plants and destructive insects, the formation of arid areas known as dust bowls, and the initiation of erosive processes by rivers.

== Adoptions ==
Lesotho has developed a National Adaptation Plan (NAP) to address climate change adaptation and mitigation. The NAPA documents the national circumstances, vulnerabilities, and expected impacts of climate change in Lesotho. Additionally, it outlines the consultations, resources, and information that were utilized to prioritize adaptation interventions. Lesotho produced its Second National Communication (SNC) to the UNFCCC in November 2013, encompassing country circumstances, greenhouse gas inventory, impacts, and vulnerability, as well as national climate policies for mitigation, adaptation, research, observations, and public education.

== See also ==
- Health in Lesotho
- Geography of Lesotho
- Climate change in Uganda
- Climate change in Namibia
- Climate change in Zimbabwe
