= Climate change in Burundi =

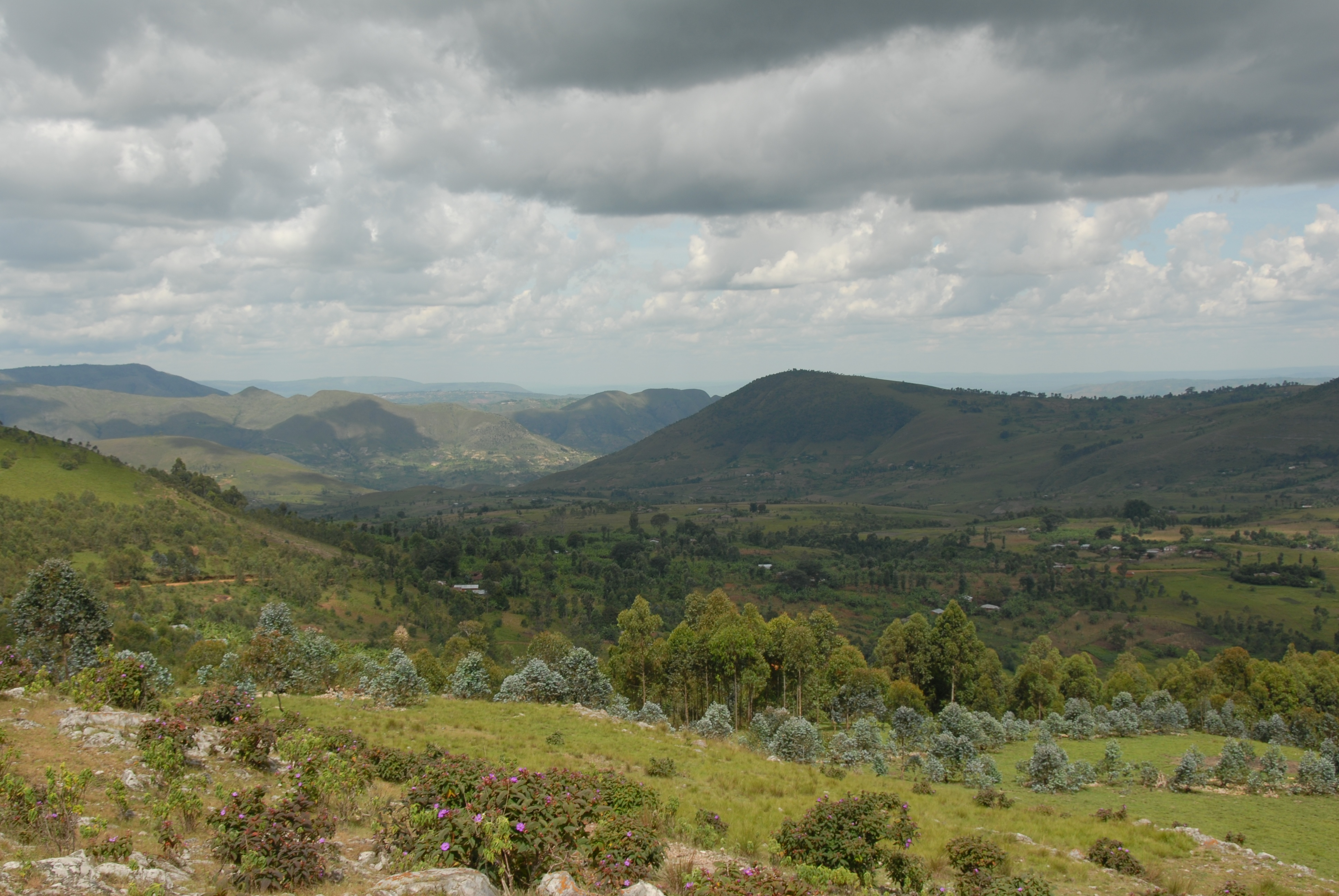
Burundi landscape

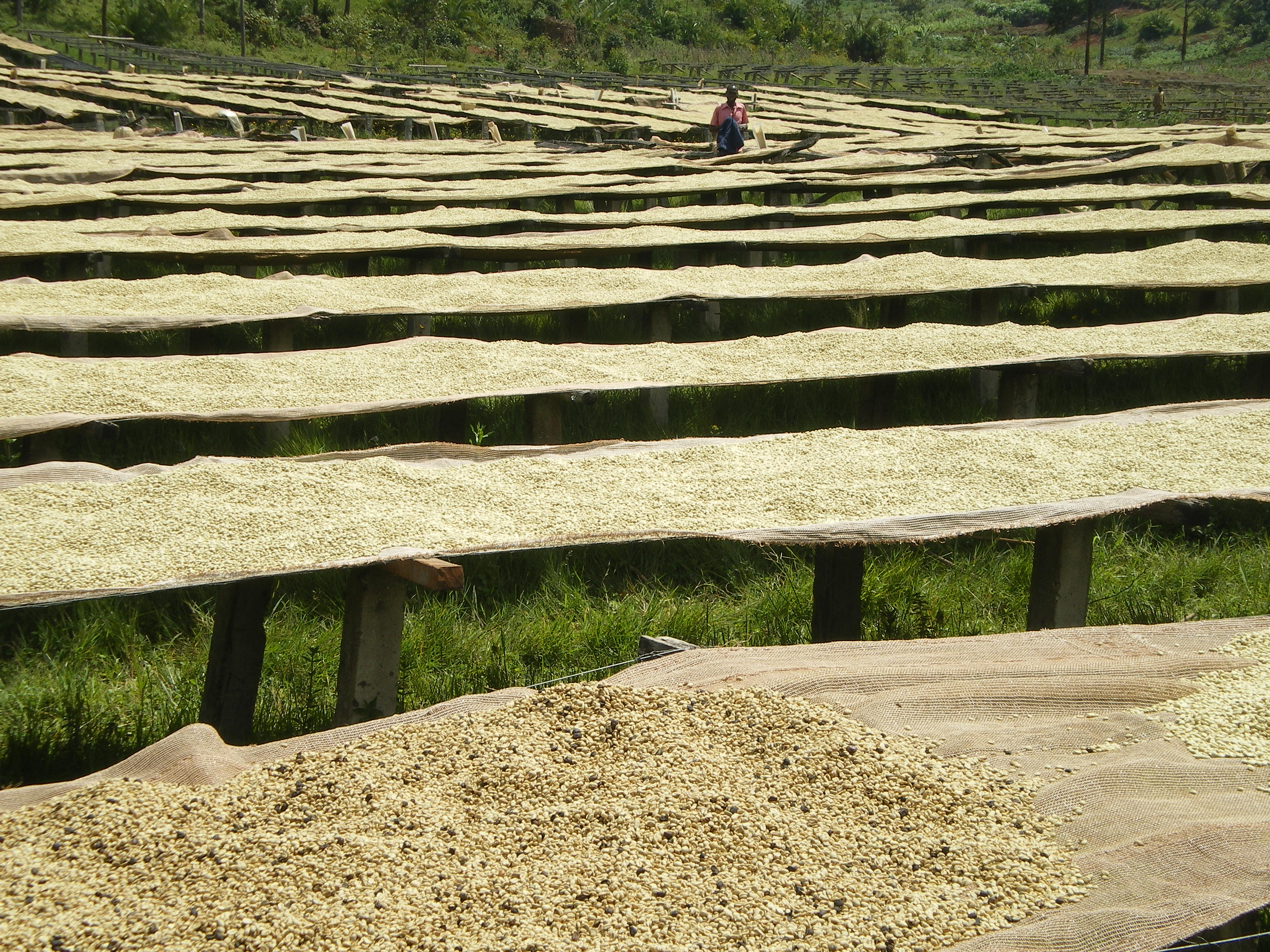
Kayanza Agriculture in Burundi

Since Climate change is now a threat, Burundi is extremely susceptible to climate change effects, whose temperature increases, whose precipitation pattern has changed, and whose occurrence of extreme climate phenomena in the form of floods and droughts is on the rise. They have considerably altered agriculture, energy, water resources, and infrastructure affecting livelihoods and development. The country has already faced an increase in average annual temperature of 0.7-0.9°C since the 1930s, and projections indicate that there will be a further rise of 1.5-2.5°C by 2050.

== Greenhouse gas emissions ==
Burundi is among the lowest GHG emitting countries in the world. Burundi released about 4,103 kilotonnes (kt) of carbon dioxide equivalent (CO₂e) in 2020, which fell from 4,215 kt in 2019 and a high of 4,519 kt in 2018. Despite the small increase in emissions over the past three decades to over 4,000 kt in 2020 from a meager 1,508 kt in 1990 the overall contribution of the nation to global emissions remains insignificantly small. Burundi has one of the world's lowest per capita emissions, standing at a mere 0.06 metric tons of CO₂e in 2023, compared to the global average per capita emission of 4.76 metric tons.

On a CO₂ intensity basis in terms of U.S. dollars of GDP (PPP), Burundi emitted approximately 0.07 kg CO₂ in 2023 per U.S. dollar of GDP (PPP), significantly lower than the world average of 0.19 kg CO₂/USD. Burundi accounts for less than 0.02% of global greenhouse gas emissions. Burundi is ranked position 22 among the world's most climate-vulnerable countries, reflecting a massive global imbalance in climate exposure and responsibility.

Fossil Carbon Dioxide (CO2) emissions of Burundi
	Fossil CO2 emissions (tons)	CO2 emissions change	CO2 emissions per capita	Population	Pop. change	Share of World's CO2 emissions
2022	924,150	2.5%	0.07	13,321,097	2.74%	0.0024%
2021	901,590	9.16%	0.07	12,965,481	2.76%	0.0024%
2020	825,970	8.86%	0.07	12,617,036	2.95%	0.0023%
2019	758,740	7.66%	0.06	12,255,336	3.34%	0.0020%
2018	704,780	35.69%	0.06	11,859,446	3.07%	0.0019%
2017	519,410	10.05%	0.05	11,506,762	2.38%	0.0014%
2016	471,980	8.74%	0.04	11,239,451	1.74%	0.0013%
2015	434,050	6.43%	0.04	11,047,580	2.29%	0.0012%
2014	407,840	−9.39%	0.04	10,799,785	3.45%	0.0011%
2013	450,100	12.41%	0.04	10,439,341	3.66%	0.0012%
2012	400,410	−3.19%	0.04	10,071,028	3.63%	0.0011%
2011	413,610	28.17%	0.04	9,717,978	3.64%	0.0012%
2010	322,710	46.33%	0.03	9,376,444	4.79%	0.00095%
2009	220,530	−1.03%	0.02	8,947,646	5.2%	0.00069%
2008	222,820	−40.73%	0.03	8,505,637	4.21%	0.00069%
2007	375,930	61.43%	0.05	8,161,874	3.77%	0.0012%
2006	232,880	26.02%	0.03	7,865,547	3.67%	0.00075%
2005	184,800	−16.17%	0.02	7,587,299	3.78%	0.00062%
2004	220,440	19.49%	0.03	7,310,656	3.8%	0.00076%
2003	184,490	−17.39%	0.03	7,043,154	3.21%	0.00067%
2002	223,330	−6.3%	0.03	6,824,132	2.86%	0.00085%
2001	238,350	−21%	0.04	6,634,365	2.54%	0.00092%
2000	301,690	0.48%	0.05	6,470,194	2.1%	0.0012%
1999	300,250	1.94%	0.05	6,337,155	2.43%	0.0012%
1998	294,540	5.68%	0.05	6,187,108	1.93%	0.0012%
1997	278,720	−0.12%	0.05	6,070,042	−0.01%	0.0011%
1996	279,060	8.02%	0.05	6,070,506	0.07%	0.0012%
1995	258,340	−2.52%	0.04	6,066,316	6.17%	0.0011%
1994	265,020	3.9%	0.05	5,713,854	0.65%	0.0012%
1993	255,080	10.86%	0.04	5,676,843	−3.1%	0.0011%
1992	230,100	−21.28%	0.04	5,858,407	2.71%	0.0010%
1991	292,290	43.15%	0.05	5,703,857	2.09%	0.0013%
1990	204,180	−16.27%	0.04	5,587,052	2.11%	0.00091%
1989	243,860	6.17%	0.04	5,471,706	1.98%	0.0011%
1988	229,680	41.62%	0.04	5,365,327	2.24%	0.0010%
1987	162,180	45.27%	0.03	5,247,787	2.31%	0.00077%
1986	111,640	4.94%	0.02	5,129,414	1.89%	0.00054%
1985	106,380	−0.04%	0.02	5,034,042	2.18%	0.00053%
1984	106,420	18.51%	0.02	4,926,465	2.45%	0.00053%
1983	89,800	21.78%	0.02	4,808,528	2.72%	0.00047%
1982	73,740	−16.56%	0.02	4,681,390	2.53%	0.00038%
1981	88,370	8.87%	0.02	4,566,014	4.16%	0.00045%
1980	81,170	−1.33%	0.02	4,383,706	4.29%	0.00041%
1979	82,260	13.79%	0.02	4,203,530	2.52%	0.00041%
1978	72,290	1.72%	0.02	4,100,338	2.93%	0.00037%
1977	71,070	3.37%	0.02	3,983,582	2.6%	0.00037%

== Climatology ==
Burundi is situated in the equatorial part of East Africa, and its climate is mostly termed as tropical highland, though a significant part is influenced by the varied terrain of the country. Altitude varies from around 775 meters in west-facing Lake Tanganyika to well above 2,600 meters in central and eastern highlands, establishing prevalent local variation in climatic conditions.

The country has four major seasons:

- A prolonged wet season between February and May
- A short dry season between June and August
- A short wet season between September and November
- A prolonged dry season between December and January

Mean annual temperatures range from 16°C to 24°C, with a variation depending on the altitude, with lower regions such as the Imbo plain being warmer, and highlands having cooler weather. Rainfall pattern is also altitudinal and geographic, ranging between 1,000–1,200 mm in the western lowlands and up to 1,500 mm or even more in the highlands.

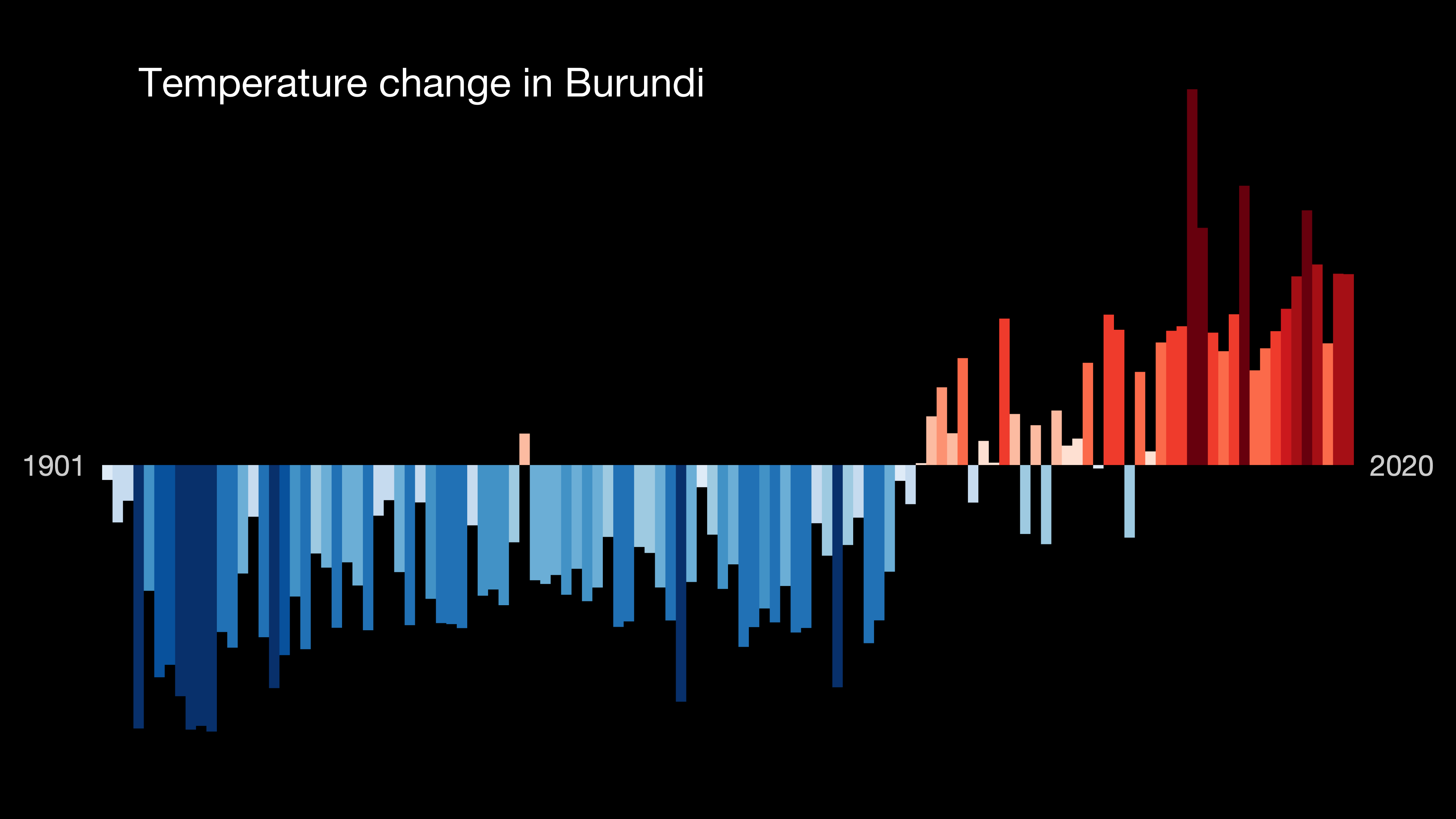
This bar chart is a visual representation of the change in temperature in the past 100+ years. Each stripe represents the temperature averaged over a year. The average temperature in 1971–2000 is set as the boundary between blue and red colors, and the color scale varies from ±2.6 standard deviations of the annual average temperatures between the years mentioned in the file name. Data source: Berkeley Earth. For more information visit https://showyourstripes.info/faq

Climate variability is increasing. In the last decades, Burundi has witnessed rising mean temperatures and unreliable rainfall, for instance, increased dry spells and intense rainfall events, predisposing to flash floods or prolonged drought. These are further exacerbated by global climate change and regional drivers such as the El Niño–Southern Oscillation (ENSO), which plays an important role in precipitation and temperature patterns of East Africa.[1] The Burundian climatology is crucial to its agrarian economy because over 90% of its population relies on rain-fed agriculture. Hence, variability in rainfall and temperature has direct consequences for food security, water availability, and ecosystem integrity.

== Impact on the natural environment ==
=== Temperature and weather changes ===
Burundi has also witnessed a general increasing tendency in mean annual temperature since 1979 at the rate of 0.31°C per decade. As a result, minimum night temperatures have fallen, and maximum day temperatures have risen.

Köppen climate classification map for Burundi for 1980–2016

2071–2100 map under the most intense climate change scenario. Mid-range scenarios are currently considered more likely

=== Water level rise ===
Despite the fact that Burundi does not have a coastline, rising lake levels, particularly in Lake Tanganyika, have caused flooding along the coast as well as affecting human settlements and infrastructure. Lake Tanganyika's overflowing water has previously filled up the port of Bujumbura, economic capital of Burundi, and caused it to be out of commission there and elsewhere in the nation relying on donations to run government programs.

=== Impact on water resources ===
Climate change has also endanger the quality and quantity of water in Burundi hence its scarcity. The risk is greater in the north and northeast, where rainfall deficiencies are already a common phenomenon, and in the western Imbo plains, which are hit by both rainfall deficiencies and floods. The transformations can decrease the availability of water and make large water sources dry up, while floods put water, sanitation, and hygiene (WASH) services under additional stress.

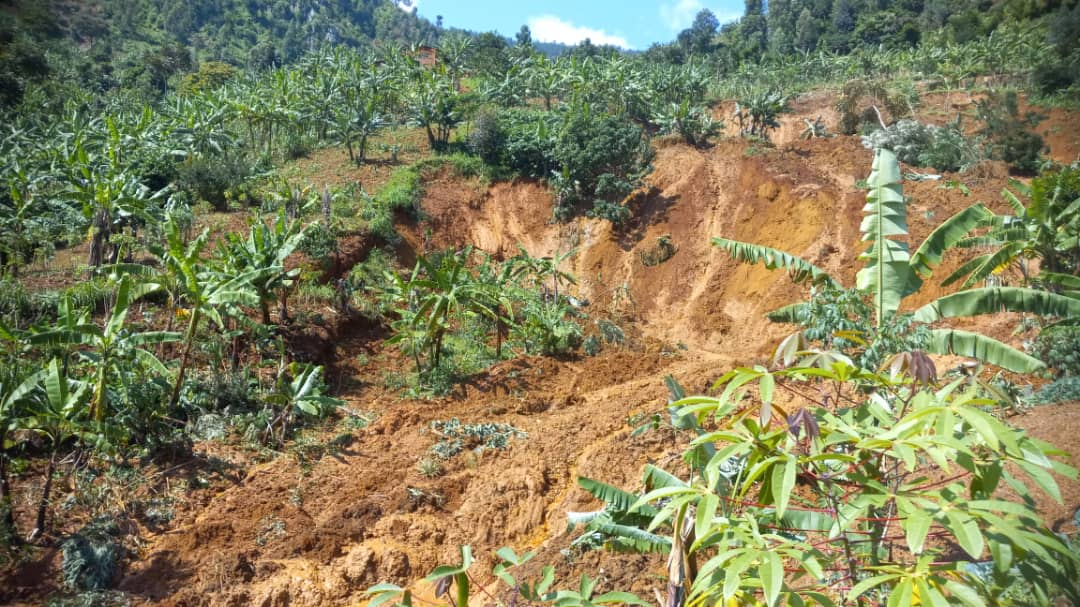
Mountain slide due to severe flooding in Burundi

== Impact on people ==
=== Economic impacts ===
The effects of climate change on the economy of Burundi are widespread, and increased exposure under climate change results in economic loss and hardship in many sectors.

=== Agriculture and livestock ===
Rain-fed agriculture is the main source of livelihood for most of Burundi’s population, especially in the northeastern part of the country. Climate change poses significant threats to food security and rural livelihoods, with increased vulnerability in the agricultural sector. Agricultural losses are substantial not just from extreme weather conditions such as flooding and drought but also through land degradation: Burundi is losing approximately 5.2% of land each year to soil erosion, and estimates suggest there could be a 200% rise in degradation rates by 2050.

=== Manufacturing sector ===
The Burundi manufacturing industry is beset by climate change, which introduces supply chain interruption and extra costs linked to the frequency of intense weather occurrences.

=== Health impacts ===
Climate change exacerbates health threats in Burundi with heightened incidents of water-related diseases such as cholera and dysentery brought on by periods of rainfall shortage and excess rainfall. These are particularly worrying for the vulnerable.

== Mitigation and adaptation ==
The Burundi Government has published important policy guidelines under Vision 2025 and sectoral strategies, such as the National Policy on Climate Change (2012), the National Water Policy (2009), the National Water Strategy (2012), the National Agricultural Strategy, the National Biodiversity Strategy and Action Plan (2013), and the National Forest Policy. The policies reduce the effects of climate change and ensure sustained development.

== Society and culture ==
Burundian culture and society are being affected by the effects of climate change, as environmental changes erode traditional social structures and tradition and require readjustment.

== See also ==
- Health in Burundi
- Geography of Burundi
- Climate change in Uganda
- Climate change in Namibia
- Climate change in Zimbabwe
