= Climate change in Eswatini =

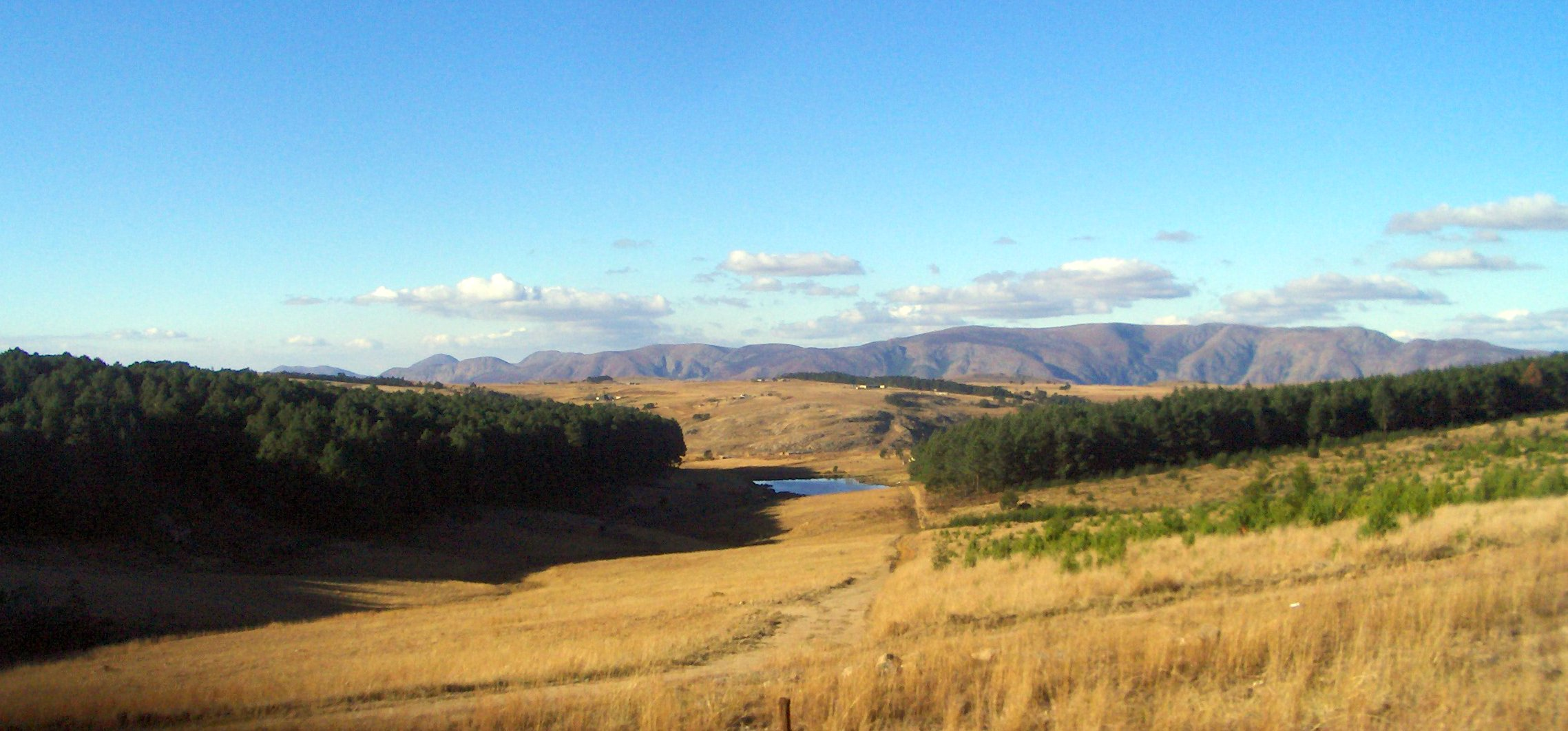
Eswatini landscape

Eswatini, a landlocked nation located in Southern Africa, is characterized by a subtropical climate that features wet and hot summers as well as cold and dry winters. The country has expressed concern regarding the impact of climate change on its existing social challenges, which include but are not limited to issues such as poverty, a high prevalence of HIV, and food insecurity. Furthermore, it is anticipated that climate change will significantly impede the country's development progress, by Vision 2022.

== Greenhouse gas emissions ==
The GHG mitigation assessment indicates that Eswatini emitted 4.5 million tonnes of greenhouse gas (GHG) emissions (equivalent to CO_{2}) in the year 2017. The primary contributors to these emissions were the energy sector, as well as agriculture, forestry, and land use, accounting for 39% and 56% of the total emissions, respectively. Industrial processes and waste were also significant contributors.

Fossil Carbon Dioxide (CO_{2}) emissions of Eswatini
Year	Fossil CO_{2} Emissions ( tons )	CO2 emissions change	CO2 emissions per capita	Population	Pop . change	Share of World's CO2 emissions
2016	657,572	2.61%	0.58	1,142,524	0.76%	0.00%
2015	640,832	0.82%	0.57	1,133,936	0.72%	0.00%
2014	635,623	3.98%	0.56	1,125,865	0.67%	0.00%
2013	611,291	0.19%	0.55	1,118,319	0.62%	0.00%
2012	610,106	0.59%	0.55	1,111,444	0.55%	0.00%
2011	606,518	4.59%	0.55	1,105,371	0.50%	0.00%
2010	579,907	6.57%	0.53	1,099,920	0.46%	0.00%
2009	544,172	1.08%	0.5	1,094,886	0.46%	0.00%
2008	538,345	3.46%	0.49	1,089,870	0.54%	0.00%
2007	520,331	5.05%	0.48	1,084,008	0.58%	0.00%
2006	495,335	7.54%	0.46	1,077,735	0.55%	0.00%
2005	460,612	4.71%	0.43	1,071,886	0.57%	0.00%
2004	439,907	1.83%	0.41	1,065,764	0.66%	0.00%
2003	431,987	3.10%	0.41	1,058,797	0.76%	0.00%
2002	418,997	0.84%	0.4	1,050,809	0.90%	0.00%
2001	415,511	11.85%	0.4	1,041,396	1.06%	0.00%
2000	371,474	55.86%	0.36	1,030,496	1.19%	0.00%
1999	238,336	27.56%	0.23	1,018,370	1.31%	0.00%
1998	186,841	0.69%	0.19	1,005,158	1.46%	0.00%
1997	185,556	13.03%	0.19	990,734	1.76%	0.00%
1996	164,161	-3.18%	0.17	973,587	2.10%	0.00%
1995	169,559	8.43%	0.18	953,573	-0.02%	0.00%
1994	156,370	-15.36%	0.16	953,737	0.03%	0.00%
1993	184,738	-5.71%	0.19	953,451	3.06%	0.00%
1992	195,934	-20.53%	0.21	925,165	3.98%	0.00%
1991	246,535	-0.70%	0.28	889,712	4.18%	0.00%
1990	248,264	-11.05%	0.29	854,011	3.40%	0.00%
1989	279,096	-13.93%	0.34	825,952	3.97%	0.00%
1988	324,267	-31.62%	0.41	794,434	4.71%	0.00%
1987	474,182	48.83%	0.63	758,669	3.91%	0.00%
1986	318,604	-3.36%	0.44	730,150	3.95%	0.00%
1985	329,670	38.99%	0.47	702,400	3.71%	0.00%
1984	237,182	-3.55%	0.35	677,303	3.33%	0.00%
1983	245,900	-35.26%	0.38	655,505	3.32%	0.00%
1982	379,828	-25.89%	0.6	634,439	2.96%	0.00%
1981	512,539	-3.37%	0.83	616,210	2.95%	0.00%
1980	530,394	-21.85%	0.89	598,564	3.36%	0.00%
1979	678,731	13.96%	1.17	579,091	3.37%	0.00%
1978	595,578	39.48%	1.06	560,236	3.30%	0.00%
1979	678,731	13.96%	1.17	579,091	3.37 %	0.00%
1980	530,394	-21.85%	0.89	598,564	3.36%	0.00%
1979	678,731	13.96%	1.17	579,091	3.37%	0.00%
1978	595,578	39.48%	1.06	560,236	3.30%	0.00%
1977	426,992	8.09%	0.79	542,328	3.21%	0.00%
1976	395,028	-19.82%	0.75	525,457	3.12%	0.00%
1975	492,688	-7.55%	0.97	509,535	3.01%	0.00%
1974	532,912	8.70%	1.08	494,624	2.90%	0.00%
1973	490,278	26.00%	1.02	480,668	2.81%	0.00%
1972	389,114	-13.54%	0.83	467,512	2.77%	0.00%
1971	450,072	0.04%	0.99	454,913	2.72%	0.00%

Köppen–Geiger present climate classification map for Eswatini

Köppen–Geiger future climate classification map for Eswatini

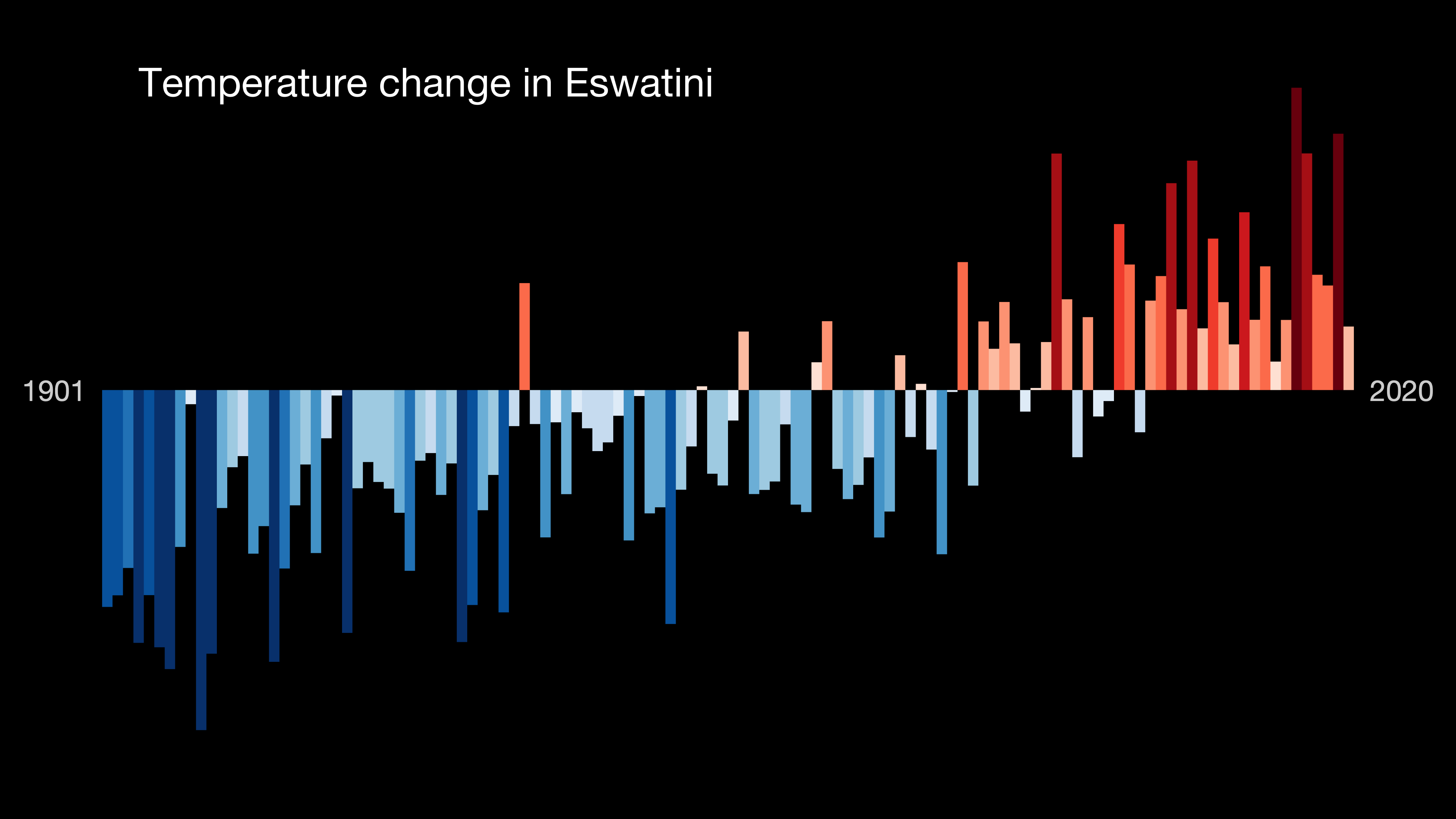

== Climatology ==
The mean annual rainfall in Swaziland varies from approximately 1,500 mm in the northern Highveld to 500 mm in the southern lowland. The rainiest periods occur from November to February, coinciding with the typically hottest time of the year. The mean monthly temperature ranges from 15 °C to 23.4 °C. During this period, the mean monthly precipitation ranges from 11.9 mm in June to 143.3 mm in January. As a result, the country experiences an average annual rainfall of over 800 mm, based on the latest climatology from 1991-2020.

== Climate change impacts ==
Swaziland is situated in the summer rainfall region of the subcontinent, where approximately 80% of the precipitation occurs during the summer months, specifically from October to March. The climate also experiences significant temperature and precipitation variations from west to east due to an altitude decrease of around 4,000 feet over a distance of about 80 kilometers.

=== Health sector ===
Climate change is expected to adversely affect Swaziland's health sector. Increased temperatures may lead to a rise in vector-borne diseases, posing a significant threat.

=== Food and water insecurity ===
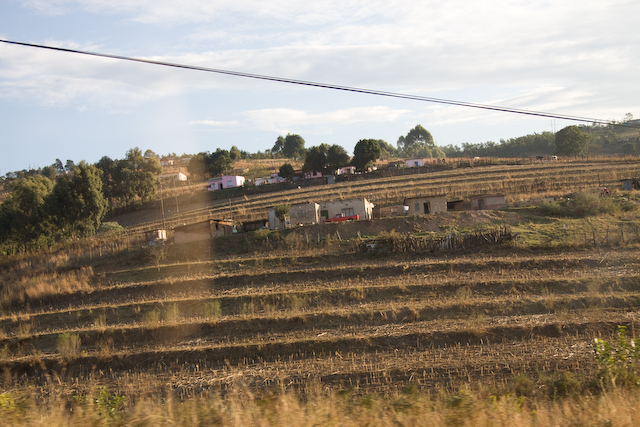
Agricultural terraces near Mbabane (Eswatini)

Severe droughts have rendered 25% of the population in Swaziland vulnerable, facing challenges of food and water insecurity. These consequences are linked to climate change impacts.

=== Water resource management ===
Climate change is anticipated to cause overall warming and drying in Swaziland, leading to more frequent and intense droughts and floods. Adaptation initiatives focus on managing water resources in response to these changes.

=== Food production ===
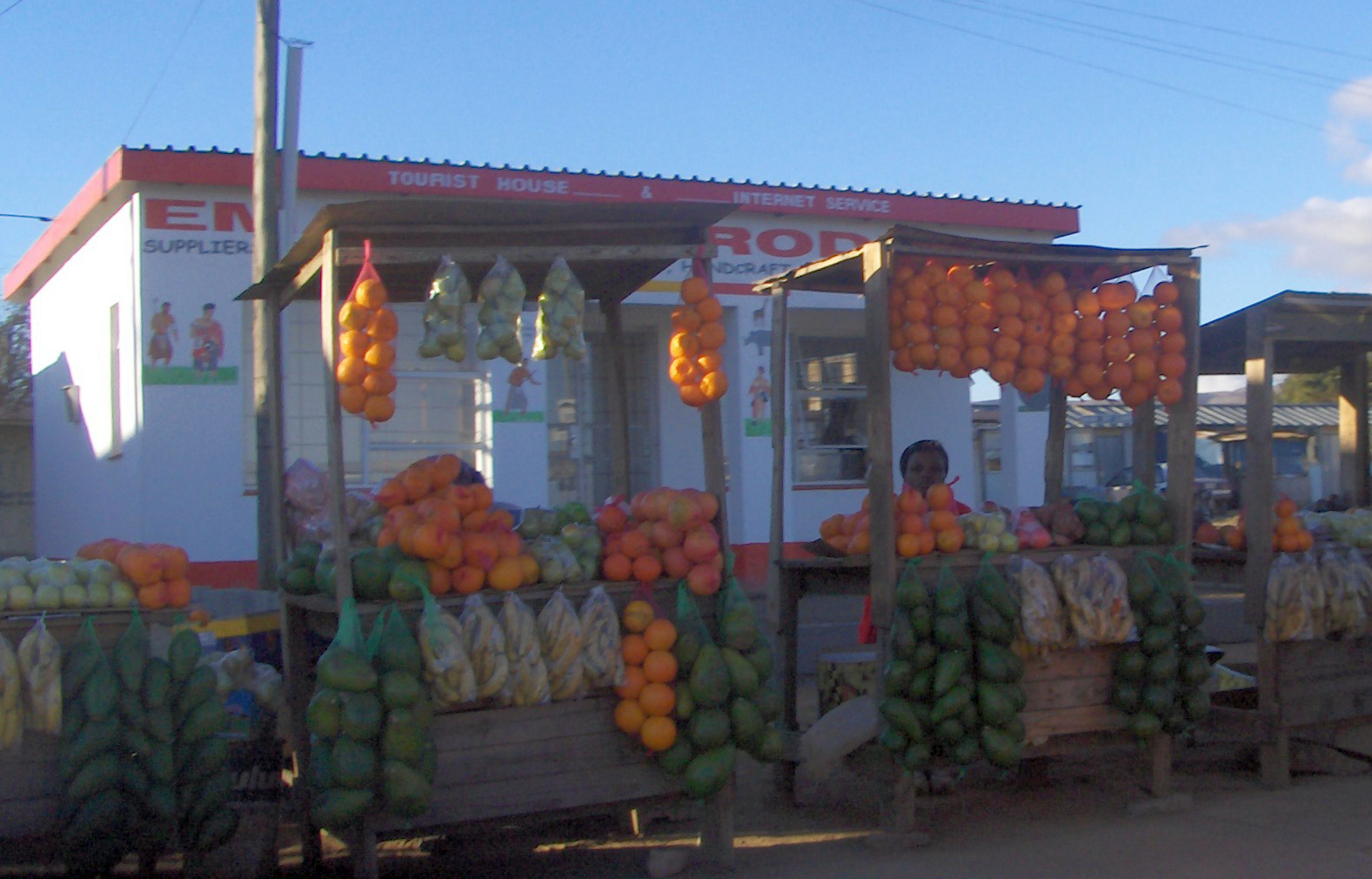
Swaziland Fruits

Climate change has been attributed to the decline in food production in Swaziland. Visible effects underscore the reality and urgency of addressing climate change impacts.

== Mitigation and adaptation strategies ==
The government of Swaziland has taken several steps to mitigate and adapt to climate change. These include the development of a National Climate Change Strategy and Action Plan, which outlines the country's vision and objectives for climate change adaptation and mitigation. The country has also implemented a number of projects aimed at reducing greenhouse gas emissions and promoting renewable energy, including the installation of solar panels on public buildings and the promotion of energy-efficient lighting.

== See also ==
- Health in Eswatini
- Geography of Eswatini
- Climate change in Uganda
- Climate change in Namibia
- Climate change in Zimbabwe
- Climate Change in Malawi
