= Climate change in Namibia =

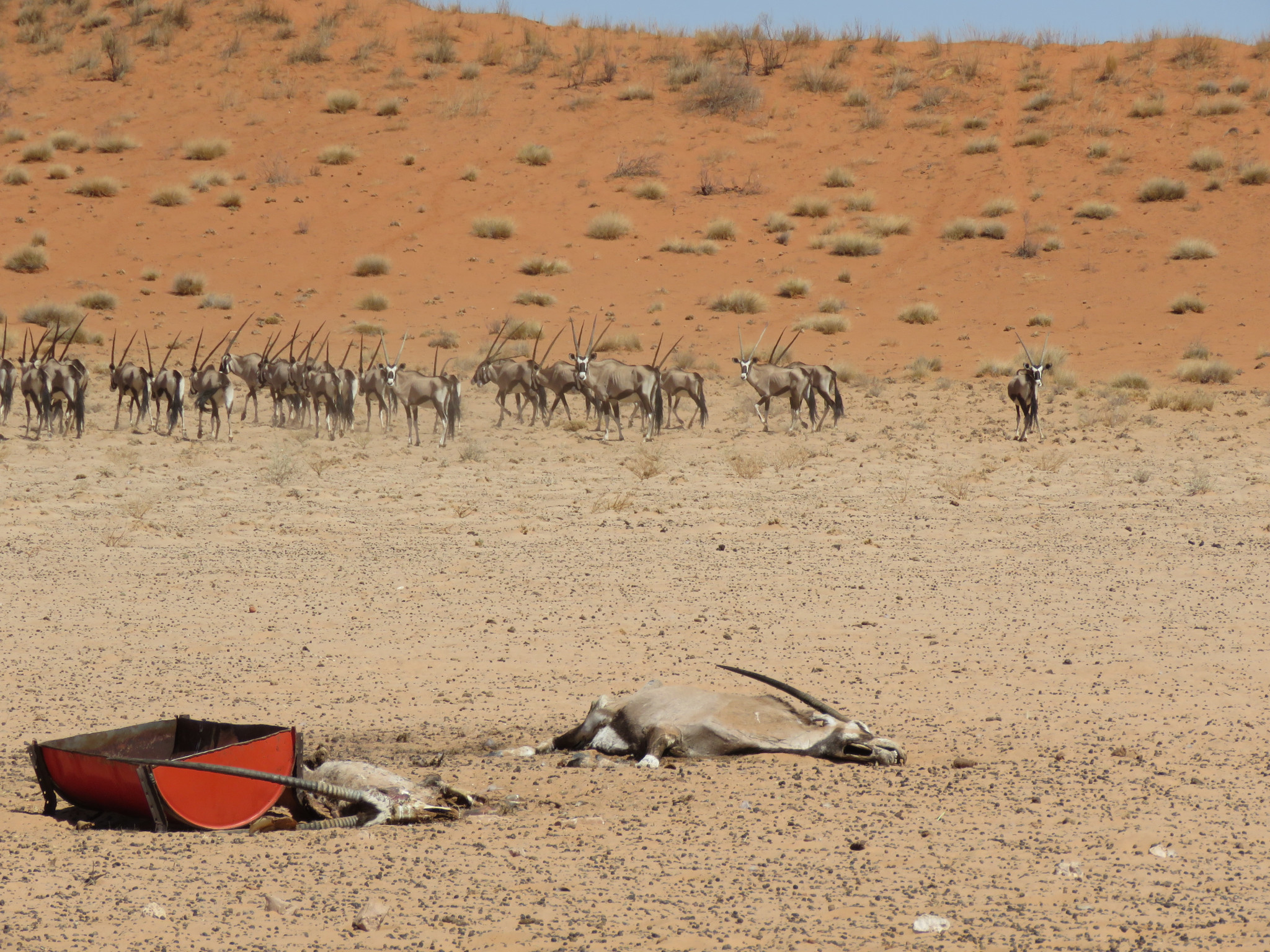
Drought conditions in Namibia are exacerbated by climate change

Climate change is the consequence of long-term alterations in the Earth's climate caused by the emission of greenhouse gases such as carbon dioxide (CO_{2}) and methane (CH_{4}). These gases can trap heat in the atmosphere, resulting in global warming and a heightened temperature on our planet. The activities carried out by humans, such as the utilization of fossil fuels (coal, oil, and natural gas), along with large-scale commercial agriculture and deforestation, are accountable for the release of these greenhouse gases. The escalating temperatures and escalating extreme heat conditions, uncertain and progressively unpredictable precipitation, and extreme weather provoke new challenges and exacerbate existing ones.

Namibia is located in the southwestern region of the African continent, lying between latitude 17°S and 29°S and longitude 11°E and 26°E. The country encompasses a land area of 825,418 km2 and boasts a coastline stretching 1,500 km along the South Atlantic Ocean. Namibia shares borders with Angola to the north, South Africa to the south, Botswana to the east, and Zambia to the northeast. The country's climate is predominantly arid, with the Namib Desert and the Kalahari Desert occupying significant portions of the eastern and western territories, respectively. Aridity diminishes as one moves toward the central plateau regions and the great escarpment situated between the central plateau and the Namib Desert. Namibia's climate is characterized by persistent droughts, unpredictable and varying rainfall patterns, substantial temperature fluctuations, and limited water resources.

== Greenhouse gas emissions ==
The African continent is responsible for 2%-3% of global greenhouse gas emissions, thereby contributing to climate change. In 2020, Namibia emitted 24.12 million tonnes of CO_{2} equivalent representing 0.05% of global emissions with a climate risk index of 107. Greenhouse gas (GHG) emissions for Namibia in 2020 were 13,560.38 kt, representing a 25.69% increase compared to 2019, 2019 was 10,788.73 kt, indicating a 7.13% decline from 2018, 2018 was 11,616.69 kt, reflecting a 6.14% decrease from 2017, 2017 were 12,376.73 kt, showing a 0.47% increase from 201.

Fossil Carbon Dioxide (CO_{2}) emissions of Namibia
Year	Fossil CO_{2} Emissions (tons)	CO2 emissions change	CO2 emissions per capita	Population	Pop. change	Share of World's CO2 emissions
2016	3,901,830	4.42%	1.68	2,323,352	1.78 %	0.01%
2015	3,736,577	0.36%	1.64	2,282,704	1.77 %	0.01%
2014	3,723,201	4.52%	1.66	2,243,001	1.75 %	0.01%
2013	3,562,114	7.55%	1.62	2,204,510	1.71 %	0.01%
2012	3,312,167	4.72%	1.53	2,167,470	1.65 %	0.01%
2011	3,162,887	5.04%	1.48	2,132,340	1.58 %	0.01%
2010	3,011,160	4.68%	1.43	2,099,271	1.52 %	0.01%
2009	2,876,601	2.35%	1.39	2,067,919	1.44 %	0.01%
2008	2,810,602	14.82%	1.38	2,038,552	1.35 %	0.01%
2007	2,447,895	3.28%	1.22	2,011,492	1.26 %	0.01%
2006	2,370,100	1.18%	1.19	1,986,558	1.21 %	0.01%
2005	2,342,441	5.22%	1.19	1,962,865	1.21 %	0.01%
2004	2,226,141	6.42%	1.15	1,939,406	1.25 %	0.01%
2003	2,091,827	6.32%	1.09	1,915,425	1.42 %	0.01%
2002	1,967,450	-13.28%	1.04	1,888,525	1.73 %	0.01%
2001	2,268,693	24.18%	1.22	1,856,402	2.05 %	0.01%
2000	1,826,996	-1.92%	1.00	1,819,141	2.30 %	0.01%
1999	1,862,734	-9.48%	1.05	1,778,277	2.44 %	0.01%
1998	2,057,847	3.21%	1.19	1,735,953	2.52 %	0.01%
1997	1,993,831	4.65%	1.18	1,693,242	2.62 %	0.01%
1996	1,905,316	7.68%	1.15	1,650,066	2.78 %	0.01%
1995	1,769,433	6.71%	1.10	1,605,370	3.01 %	0.00%
1994	1,658,125	15.25%	1.06	1,558,449	3.22 %	0.00%
1993	1,438,731	16.06%	0.95	1,509,834	3.29 %	0.00%
1992	1,239,607	8.71%	0.85	1,461,687	3.25 %	0.00%
1991	1,140,283	50.77%	0.81	1,415,617	3.40 %	0.00%
1990	756,289	-15.21%	0.55	1,369,011	6.28 %	0.00%
1989	891,949	8.82%	0.69	1,288,070	6.63 %	0.00%
1988	819,618	19.45%	0.68	1,207,949	3.65 %	0.00%
1987	686,184	20.76%	0.59	1,165,430	3.32 %	0.00%
1986	568,217	-22.10%	0.50	1,127,989	3.17 %	0.00%
1985	729,395	1.91%	0.67	1,093,311	2.95 %	0.00%
1984	715,750	-0.67%	0.67	1,061,995	2.80 %	0.00%
1983	720,581	-3.79%	0.70	1,033,085	2.74 %	0.00%
1982	748,977	-0.71%	0.74	1,005,520	1.84 %	0.00%
1981	754,340	6.79%	0.76	987,394	1.17 %	0.00%
1980	706,384	-3.32%	0.72	975,994	1.95 %	0.00%
1979	730,657	15.54%	0.76	957,334	1.63 %	0.00%
1978	632,400	-3.73%	0.67	942,023	1.72 %	0.00%
1977	656,901	10.25%	0.71	926,109	2.69 %	0.00%
1976	595,845	-5.38%	0.66	901,840	2.88 %	0.00%
1975	629,700	1.12%	0.72	876,572	3.12 %	0.00%
1974	622,753	4.68%	0.73	850,091	3.05 %	0.00%
1973	594,924	7.22%	0.72	824,918	3.04 %	0.00%
1972	554,850	1.92%	0.69	800,610	3.04 %	0.00%
1971	544,401	0.15%	0.70	776,995	2.99 %	0.00%

== Impact on the natural environment ==
=== Temperature and weather changes ===
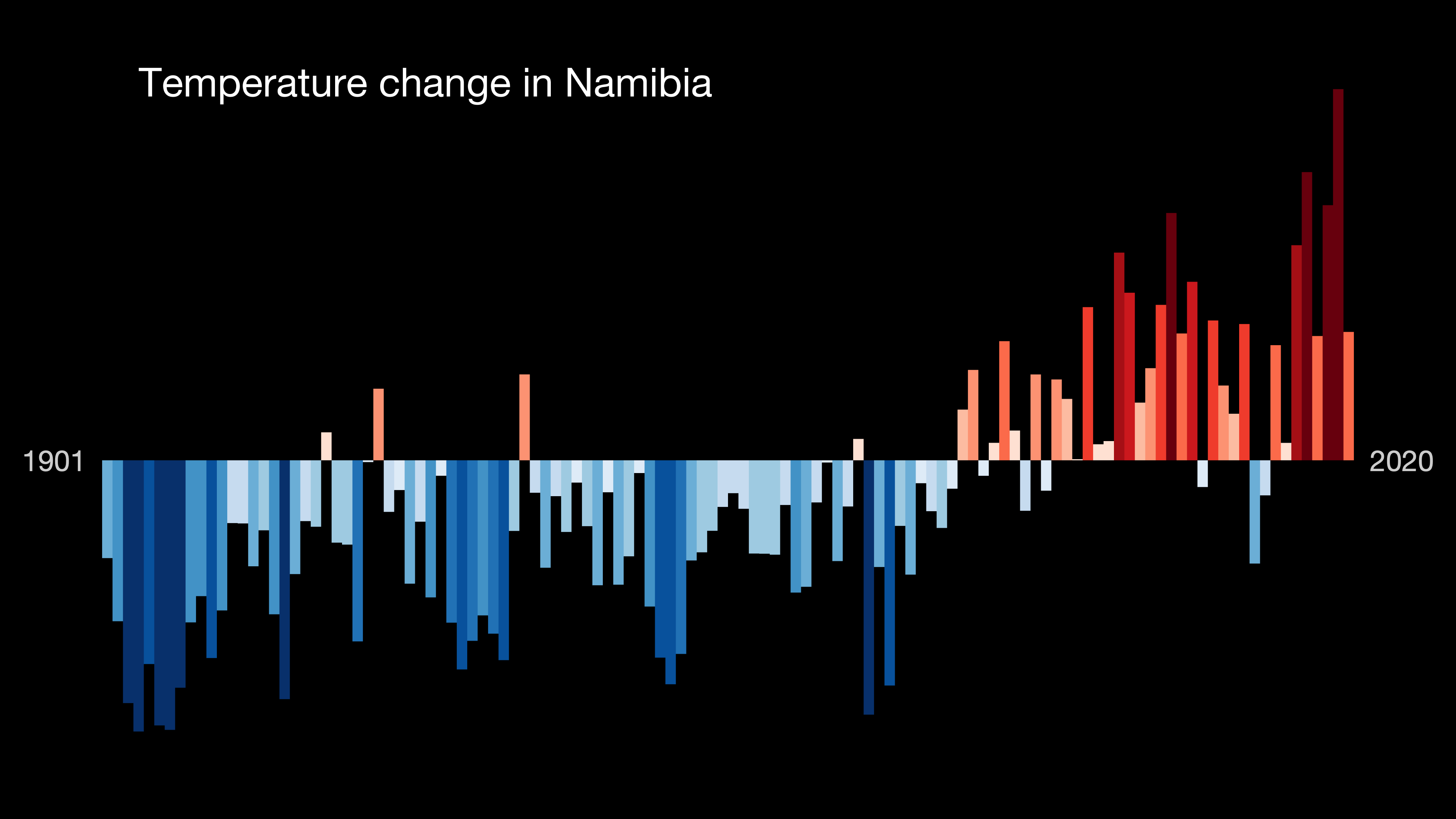
This bar chart is a visual representation of the change in temperature in the past 100+ years. Each stripe represents the temperature averaged over a year. The average temperature in 1971–2000 is set as the boundary between blue and red colors, and the color scale varies from ±2.6 standard deviations of the annual average temperatures between the years mentioned in the file name

Köppen climate classification map for Namibia for 1980–2016

2071–2100 map under the most intense climate change scenario. Mid-range scenarios are currently considered more likely

The effects of climate change, both current and future, present significant risks to human health, welfare, and the natural environment. Namibia is experiencing clear indications of increasing temperatures. Over the past century, surface temperatures in Namibia have risen by 1.2 degrees Celsius, and the frequency of extreme temperatures has increased by 10% in the last four decades. Southern Africa, including Namibia, has warmed by approximately 0.8 degrees Celsius since 1900, and recent years have witnessed the highest temperatures on record since the 19th century. Projections indicate that summer temperatures may rise between 1 °C and 3.5 °C and winter temperatures between 1 °C and 4 °C within the period of 2046-2065. There has been a noticeable increase in the number of days exceeding 35 °C, contributing to the overall trend of rising maximum temperatures. The evidence of climate change extends beyond surface temperature increases and encompasses changing precipitation patterns. However, attributing these changes to climate change in the context of Namibia's rainfall variability proves challenging. Records suggest that the frequency of both droughts and floods has risen by approximately 18% on average over the last four decades when compared to previous periods. This multifaceted evidence underscores the urgency of addressing climate change and its impacts on Namibia's climate system. The mean annual temperature for Namibia is 20.6 °C, with average monthly temperatures ranging between 24 °C (November to March) and 16 °C (June, July).

=== Impact on water resources ===
Climate change is contributing to a global increase in temperatures, and this is also true for Namibia. The rising temperatures are resulting in higher rates of evaporation, which in turn decreases the availability of surface water and worsens water scarcity within the country. Namibia heavily relies on rainfall to meet its water needs, especially in rural regions. However, climate change is modifying precipitation patterns, leading to more intense and unpredictable rainfall events. Consequently, these changes can cause flash floods, erosion, and a decrease in groundwater recharge, all of which greatly impact water resources. Additionally, Namibia has been experiencing prolonged droughts as a result of climate change. These droughts can deplete water reservoirs such as aquifers and severely affect the country's water supply and sanitation systems. The coastal areas of Namibia are particularly vulnerable to rising sea levels, which can result in the intrusion of saltwater into freshwater aquifers, further compromising the quality and availability of water resources.

=== Ecosystems ===
Climate change is causing shifts in temperature and precipitation patterns, resulting in decreased rainfall in Namibia. This decrease in rainfall affects the production of staple crops, leading to food insecurity and impacting ecosystems. Furthermore, climate change manifests in droughts and other extreme weather events, which have a significant impact on natural ecosystems. These changing conditions are causing shifts in species and habitats, thereby affecting biodiversity. Particularly, Namibia's endemic species are highly vulnerable to climate change, as they face threats to their survival due to changing environmental conditions. Additionally, the reduced rainfall and increased temperatures brought about by climate change can result in severe water shortages, affecting both human communities and ecosystems in Namibia. Therefore, water policies and practices play a crucial role in maintaining the health of ecosystems. The impacts of climate change on water resources are interconnected with biodiversity and the well-being of ecosystems. As projected, Namibia is expected to experience a more rapid increase in temperatures compared to many other countries, leading to an increasing frequency of drought conditions. This exacerbates the stress on ecosystems. Climate change has adverse effects on fish stocks and coastal livelihoods, further impacting natural ecosystems and the tourism industry in Namibia.

=== Agriculture and livestock ===
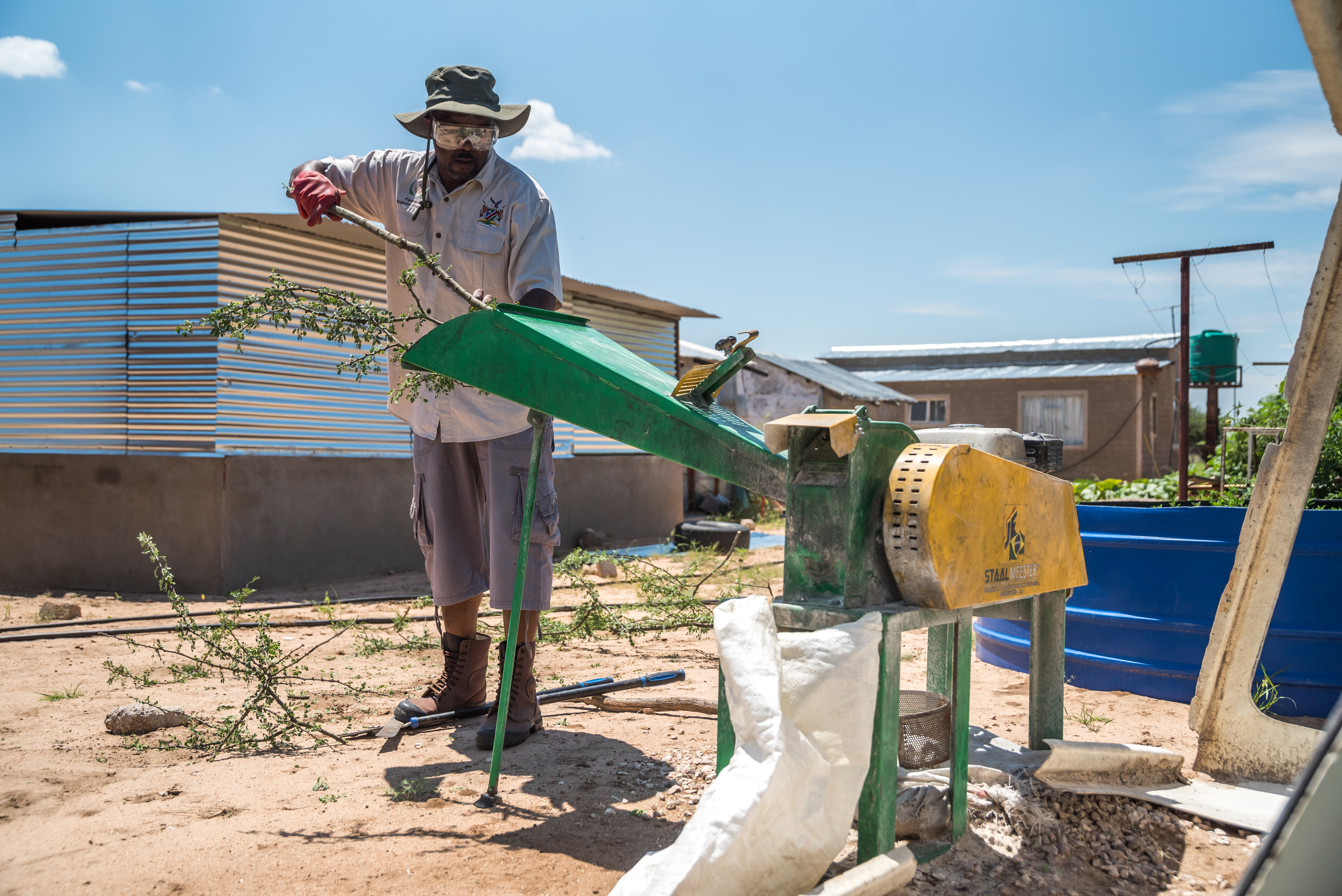
Animal fodder production that aims to counter woody plant encroachment and enhance climate resilience

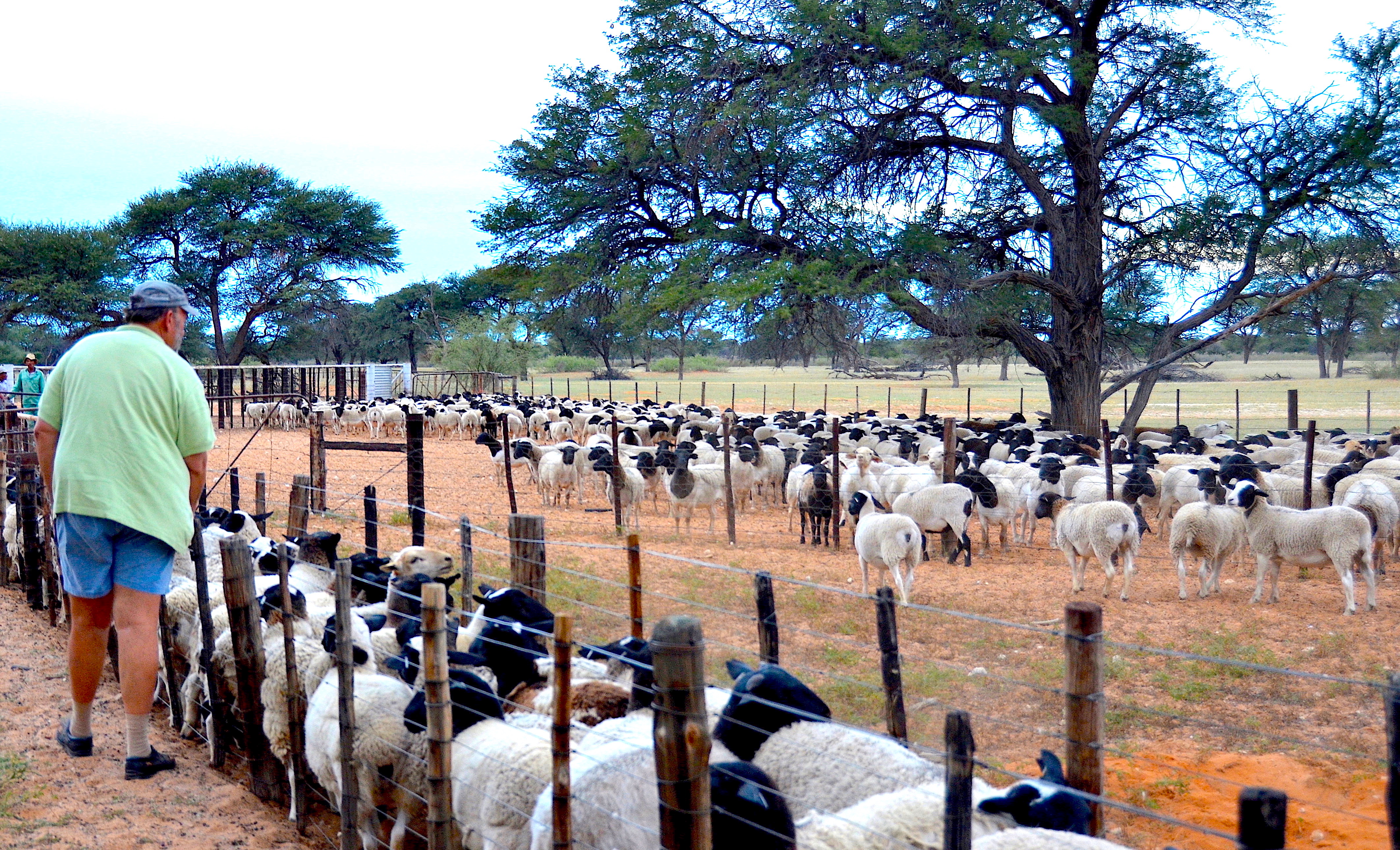
Sheep farming in Namibia

Climate change has had a significant impact on agriculture and livestock in Namibia, resulting in consequences on food security and the livelihoods of many Namibians. Due to climate change, Namibia is experiencing more frequent and severe droughts, leading to decreased availability of water for agriculture and livestock. Consequently, this directly affects crop yields and the access to water for livestock. The changing climate has also caused unpredictable rainfall patterns, making it challenging for farmers to predict the optimal times for planting and harvesting. This unpredictability can lead to lower crop yields and decreased agricultural productivity. Livestock farming plays a crucial role in Namibia's agriculture. However, climate change-related factors such as rising temperatures and the spread of diseases have a negative impact on livestock health and productivity. Therefore, livestock farmers adapt their practices to cope with these challenges. In order to mitigate the effects of climate change, Namibian farmers are increasingly adopting conservation agriculture practices. This approach involves minimizing soil disturbance, implementing cover crops, and implementing crop rotation to enhance soil health and water retention, ultimately improving resilience to climate variability. Several projects, including those supported by the World Bank and the United Nations Development Programme (UNDP), are focused on promoting climate-resilient livestock systems, as well as enhancing traditional crops and livestock farming practices in Namibia. These initiatives aim to assist farmers in adapting to the changing climate and building resilience in their agricultural and livestock operations.

Occupation by subsector for 2016
Occupation (ISCO-88)5	Livestock farming	Crop farming
Legislators, senior officers and managers	953	402
Professionals	259	186
Technicians and associate professionals	1366	263
Clerks	151	353
Service workers and sales	2205	1067
Skilled agricultural	40892	24583
Craft and related trades	905	446
Plant and machine operators	671	332
Elementary occupation	35631	18865
Armed forces		162
Total	83032	46

== Health impacts ==
Climate change in Namibia has resulted in an upsurge of water and vector-borne diseases, causing a direct impact on the public's health and overall well-being. The effect of climate change on Namibia's economy and livelihoods is projected to be substantial, subsequently influencing people's health due to economic hardship and research reveals that 3.6 billion people are already living in areas highly susceptible to climate change. Between 2030 and 2050, climate change is expected to cause approximately 250,000 additional deaths per year, from undernutrition, malaria, diarrhea, and heat stress alone. Specifically, the north-central regions of Namibia are particularly susceptible to the consequences of climate change, exacerbated by environmental degradation and social vulnerability, which further contribute to health risks. Notably, organizations such as the Namibia Nature Foundation are actively engaged in combatting the effects of climate change on both human health and the environment.

== Mitigation and adaptations ==
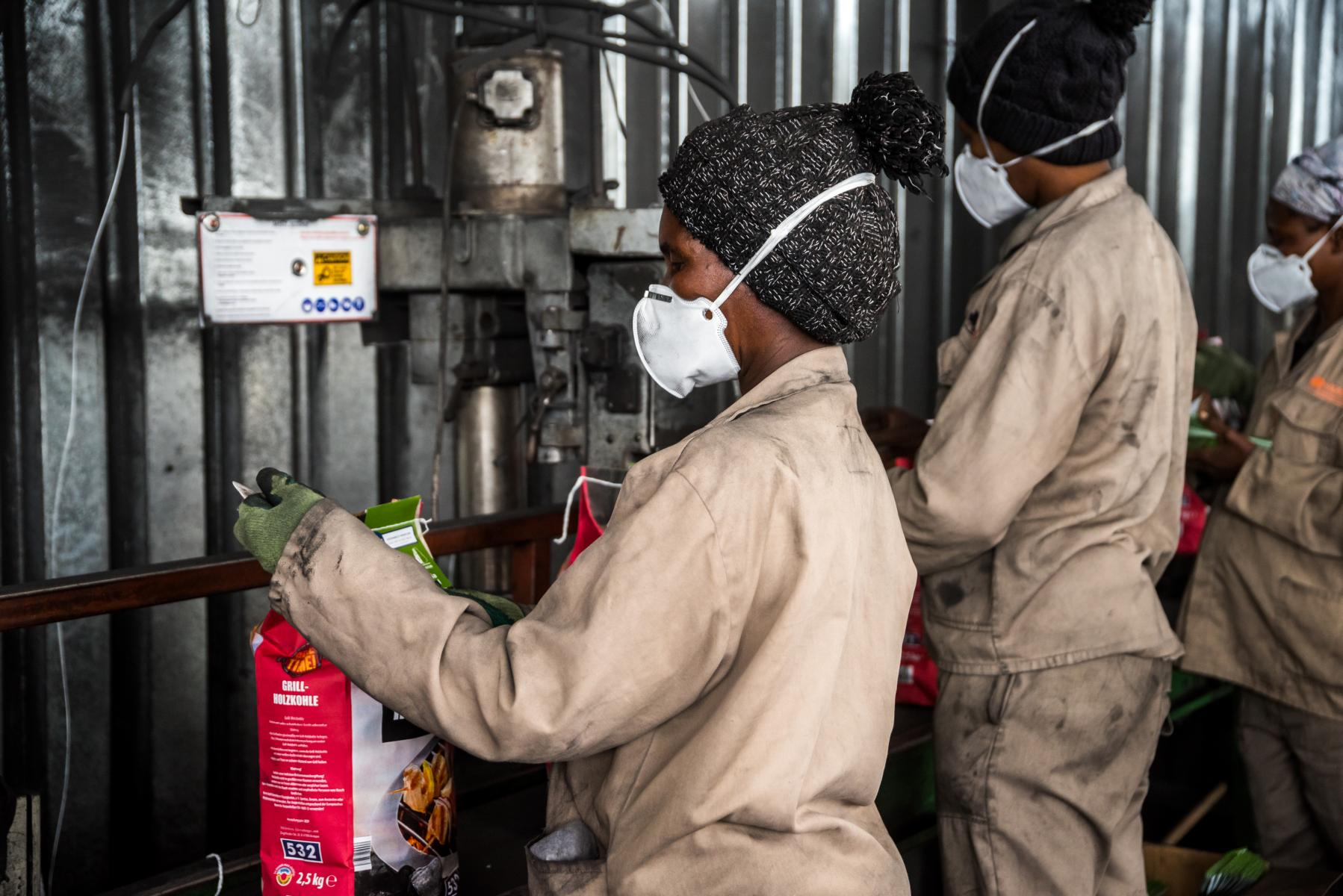
Women package locally produced charcoal, which is used to diversify rural farming income

Namibia has implemented climate change mitigation strategies through its National Climate Change Strategy and Action Plan (NCCSAP) from 2013 to 2020. These strategies encompass both adaptation and mitigation efforts, with a focus on addressing the challenges posed by climate change in the country. Namibia's NCCSAP includes policies and actions aimed at adapting to the impacts of climate change. These measures assist communities and ecosystems in coping with the changing climate, such as enhancing water resource management in Namibia's arid regions. The NCCSAP also outlines strategies to reduce greenhouse gas emissions and combat climate change. These strategies may involve transitioning to cleaner and more sustainable energy sources and improving energy efficiency. Namibia's climate change policies align with the National Development Goals and Vision 2030, ensuring that climate action is integrated into the country's broader development agenda. The government is actively working to create a conducive environment for climate change adaptation and mitigation, aiming to strengthen its policies and measures in this regard.

== See also ==
- Climate change in Africa
- Water supply and sanitation in Namibia
- Effects of climate change
- Economy of Namibia
- Agriculture in Namibia
- Geography of Namibia
- Health in Namibia
