= Climate change in Zimbabwe =

Emissions, impacts and responses of the Zimbabwe related to climate change

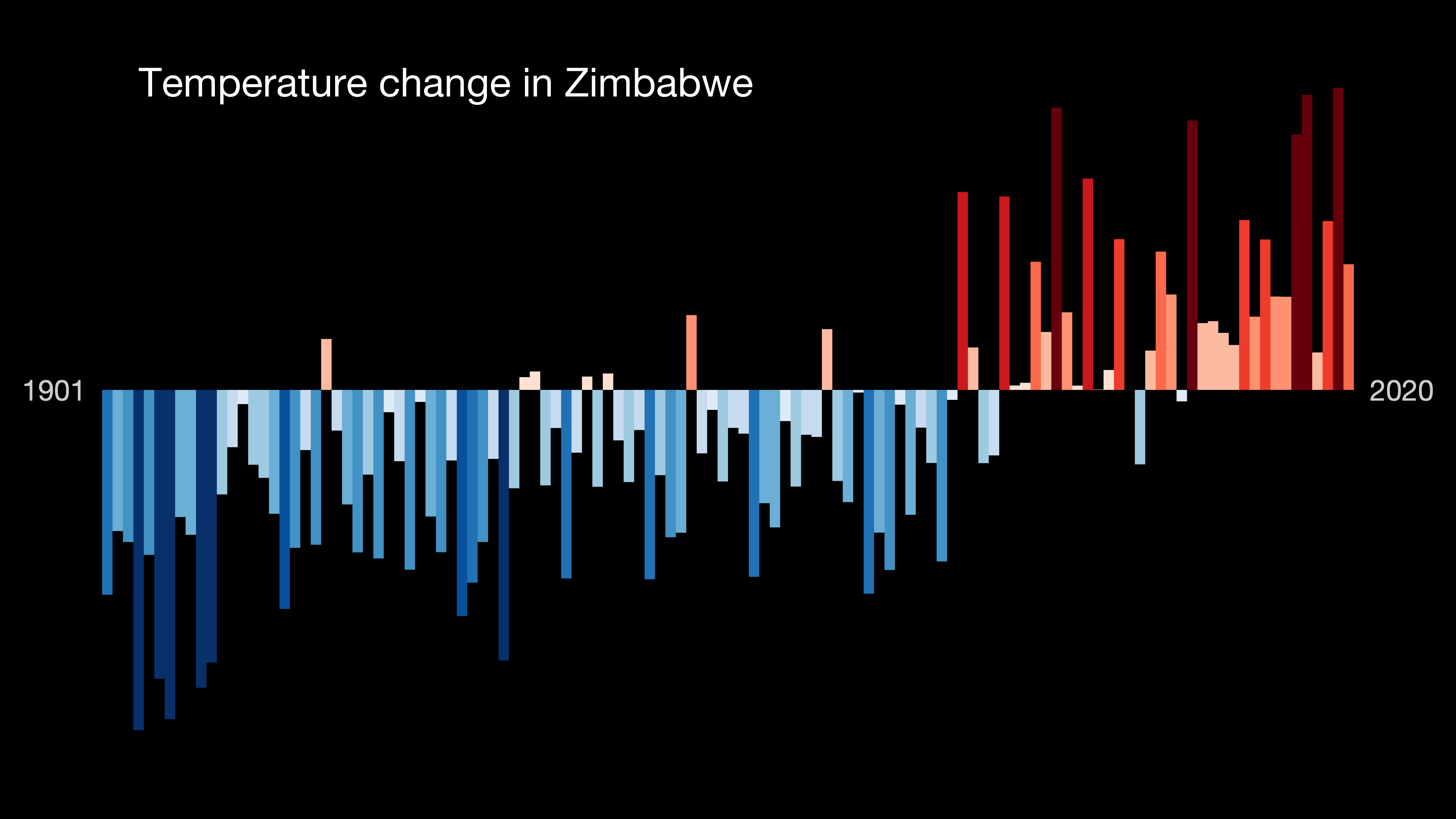
This bar chart is a visual representation of the change in temperature in the past 100+ years. Each stripe represents the temperature averaged over a year. The average temperature in 1971–2000 is set as the boundary between blue and red colors, and the color scale varies from ±2.6 standard deviations of the annual average temperatures between the years mentioned in the file name

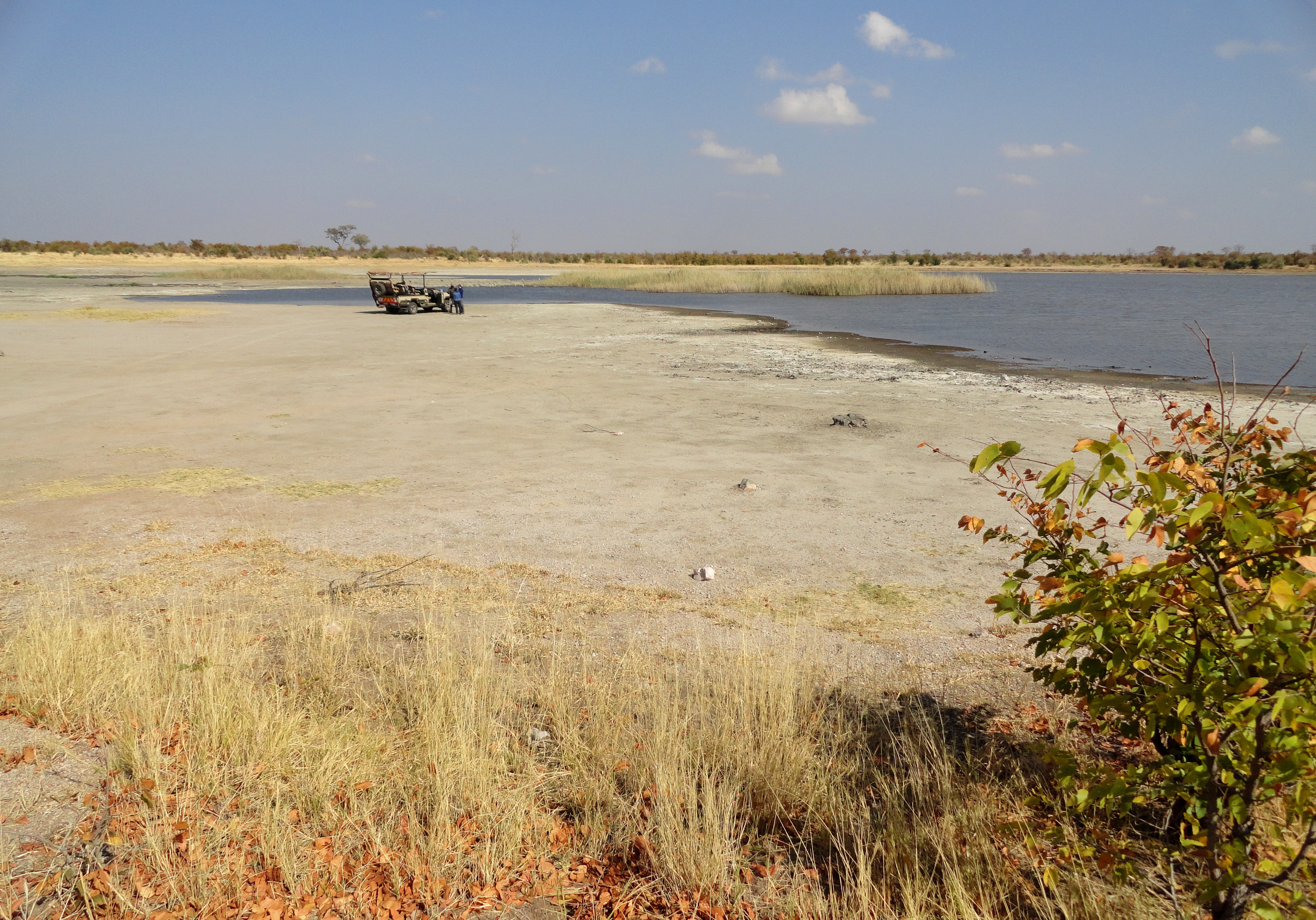
Hwange National Park, Zimbabwe

Climate change impacts are occurring in Zimbabwe. Climate change is the result of the Earth's climate undergoing long-term changes due to the release of greenhouse gases like carbon dioxide (CO_{2}) and methane (CH_{4}). These gases trap heat in the atmosphere, leading to global warming and a hotter planet. Human activities, such as the use of fossil fuels (coal, oil, and natural gas), as well as large-scale commercial agriculture and deforestation, are responsible for the release of these greenhouse gases. The country's contribution to greenhouse gas emissions is very minimal.

== Greenhouse gas emissions ==
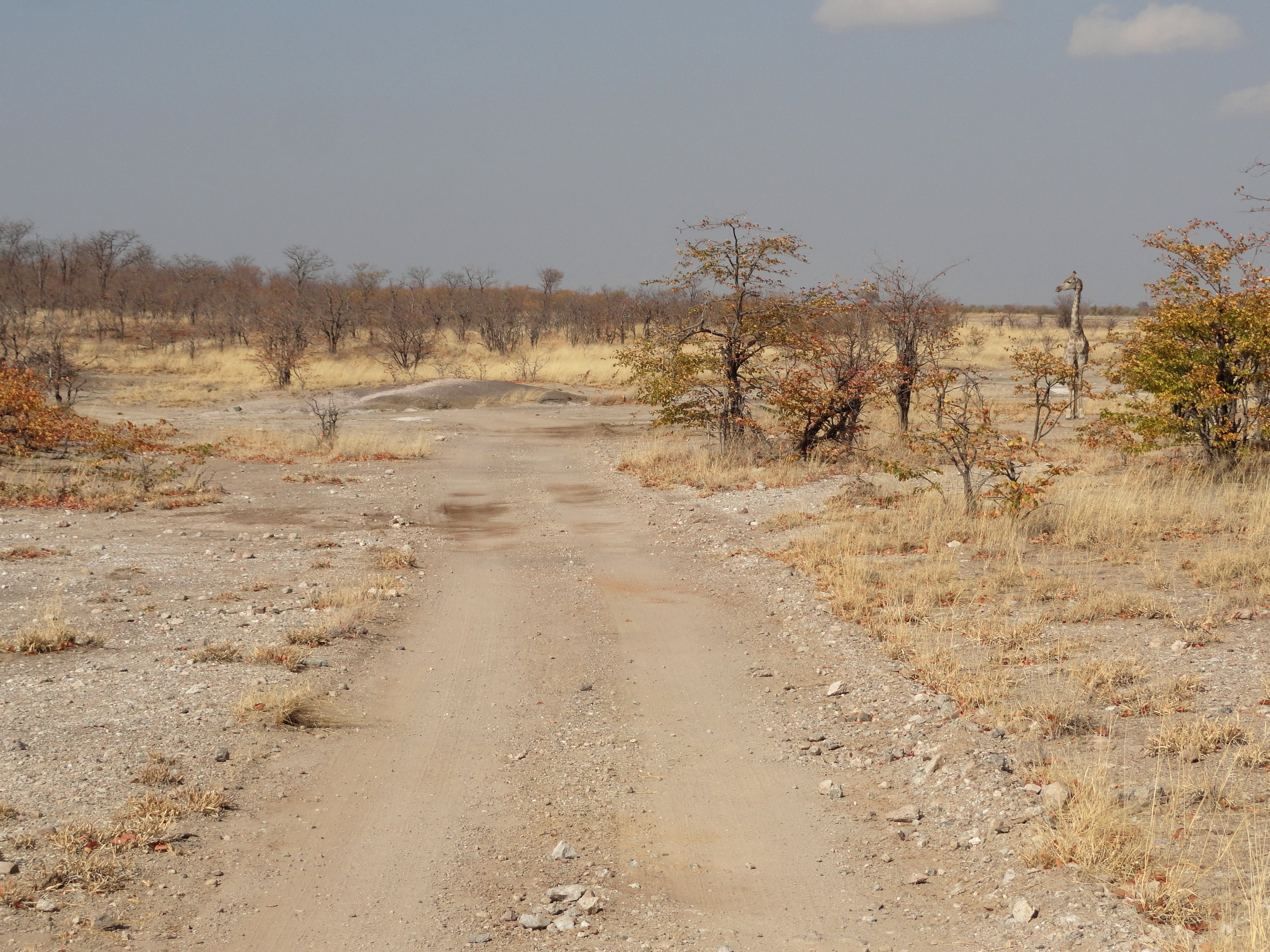
Hwange National Park, Zimbabwe

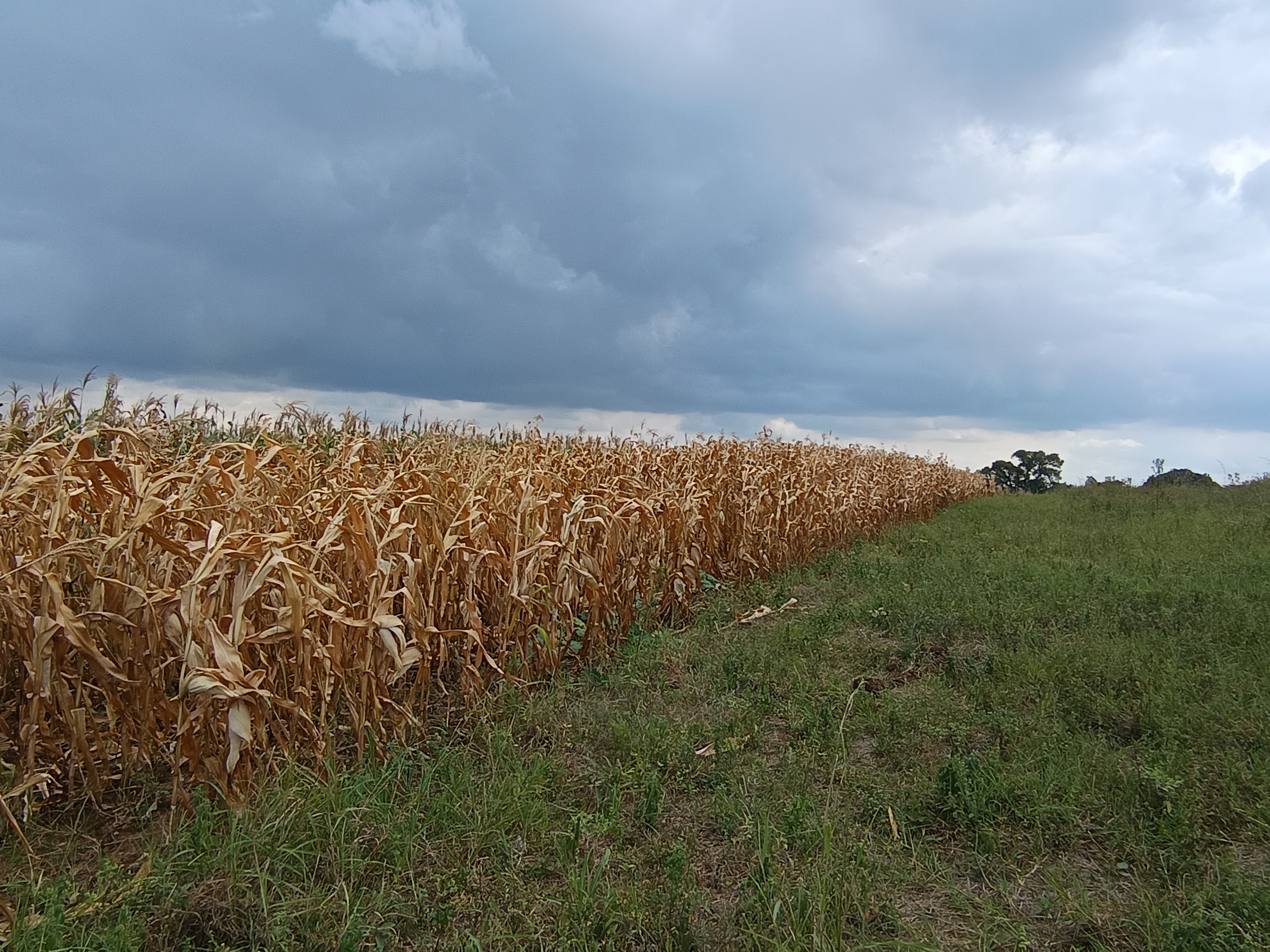
Farming Maize At Cashel Valley, Zimbabwe

The African continent contributes 2%-3% of global greenhouse gas emissions, which contribute to climate change. Zimbabwe makes up less than 0.1% of these emissions. Despite its minimal contribution, all African countries have submitted plans to reduce their emissions. In 2015, Zimbabwe committed to reducing its emissions by 33% by the year 2030. However, in 2021, it revised its target to a more ambitious 40% reduction by 2030 across all sectors. This significant improvement demonstrates Zimbabwe's dedication to reducing emissions from all emitting sectors. Fossil CO_{2} emissions in Zimbabwe totaled 10,062,628 tons in 2016. This represented a decrease of -4.17% compared to the previous year, amounting to -437,903 tons less than the 2015 emissions of 10,500,531 tons. The CO_{2} emissions per capita in Zimbabwe were 0.70 tons per person in 2016, based on a population of 14,452,704. This signifies a decrease of -0.05 from the previous year's figure of 0.74 CO_{2} tons per person, reflecting a change of -6.1% in CO_{2} emissions per capita.

Fossil Carbon Dioxide (CO_{2}) emissions of Zimbabwe
Year	Fossil CO_{2} Emissions (tons)	CO_{2} emissions change	CO_{2} emissions per capita	Population	Pop. the of World's CO_{2} emissions	Share of World's CO_{2} emissions
2016	10,062,628	-4.17%	0.70	14,452,704	2.10 %	0.03%
2015	10,500,531	-2.38%	0.74	14,154,937	2.16 %	0.03%
2014	10,756,516	-1.11%	0.78	13,855,753	2.22 %	0.03%
2013	10,877,592	1.54%	0.80	13,555,422	2.19 %	0.03%
2012	10,712,268	3.00%	0.81	13,265,331	1.84 %	0.03%
2011	10,400,034	9.11%	0.80	13,025,785	1.45 %	0.03%
2010	9,531,494	10.93%	0.74	12,839,771	1.26 %	0.03%
2009	8,592,521	8.62%	0.68	12,679,810	1.03 %	0.02%
2008	7,910,492	-22.95%	0.63	12,550,347	0.80 %	0.02%
2007	10,266,621	-2.20%	0.82	12,450,568	0.97 %	0.03%
2006	10,497,312	-7.84%	0.85	12,330,490	0.86 %	0.03%
2005	11,390,701	8.68%	0.93	12,224,753	0.53 %	0.03%
2004	10,480,912	-6.81%	0.86	12,160,881	0.70 %	0.03%
2003	11,246,961	-12.26%	0.93	12,075,828	0.76 %	0.03%
2002	12,819,236	-6.29%	1.07	11,984,644	0.62 %	0.04%
2001	13,680,092	-2.63%	1.15	11,910,978	0.64 %	0.04%
2000	14,049,334	-15.44%	1.19	11,834,676	1.01 %	0.04%
1999	16,614,928	12.83%	1.42	11,716,454	1.46 %	0.05%
1998	14,725,785	1.44%	1.28	11,548,364	1.64 %	0.04%
1997	14,516,181	-6.15%	1.28	11,362,401	1.65 %	0.04%
1996	15,468,174	-3.66%	1.38	11,178,171	1.67 %	0.04%
1995	16,055,450	-1.51%	1.46	10,994,041	1.25 %	0.04%
1994	16,300,973	-6.36%	1.50	10,858,594	0.59 %	0.05%
1993	17,407,420	-8.32%	1.61	10,794,918	1.44 %	0.05%
1992	18,988,185	0.60%	1.78	10,641,501	2.54 %	0.05%
1991	18,875,286	10.14%	1.82	10,377,815	2.61 %	0.05%
1990	17,138,197	12.24%	1.69	10,113,893	2.72 %	0.05%
1989	15,268,803	1.35%	1.55	9,846,346	2.90 %	0.04%
1988	15,065,510	-3.32%	1.57	9,568,739	3.14 %	0.04%
1987	15,582,386	27.76%	1.68	9,277,488	3.28 %	0.04%
1986	12,196,857	14.81%	1.36	8,983,044	3.37 %	0.03%
1985	10,623,667	15.65%	1.22	8,690,515	3.48 %	0.03%
1984	9,186,051	5.19%	1.09	8,398,567	3.60 %	0.03%
1983	8,732,786	-0.74%	1.08	8,106,356	3.88 %	0.02%
1982	8,798,266	-4.08%	1.13	7,803,855	3.96 %	0.02%
1981	9,172,977	-4.33%	1.22	7,506,526	6.48 %	0.03%
1980	9,588,387	6.84%	1.36	7,049,926	5.92 %	0.03%
1979	8,974,917	3.13%	1.35	6,655,833	1.63 %	0.03%
1978	8,702,623	-3.81%	1.33	6,549,349	1.49 %	0.02%
1977	9,047,336	-9.64%	1.40	6,453,044	2.62 %	0.03%
1976	10,012,682	10.64%	1.59	6,288,387	3.14 %	0.03%
1975	9,049,740	-11.82%	1.48	6,097,083	3.28 %	0.03%
1974	10,262,447	-2.93%	1.74	5,903,530	3.34 %	0.03%
1973	10,571,871	15.84%	1.85	5,712,712	3.25 %	0.03%
1972	9,125,921	-4.69%	1.65	5,532,842	3.16 %	0.03%
1971	9,575,243	-0.55%	1.79	5,363,423	3.08 %	0.03%

== Impact on the natural environment ==
=== Temperature and weather changes ===
Köppen climate classification map for Zimbabwe for 1980–2016

2071–2100 map under the most intense climate change scenario. Mid-range scenarios are currently considered more likely

The mean annual temperature has been increasing at a rate of approximately 0.01 to 0.02 degrees Celsius per year from 1950 to 2002. According to the Zimbabwe Meteorological Service, minimum daily temperatures have risen by about 2.6 degrees Celsius over the past century, while maximum daily temperatures have increased by 2 degrees Celsius during the same period. Furthermore, there has been a decrease in cold days and nights and an increase in hot days. These changes align with the overall warming trend, with more hot days and nights and fewer cold days and nights observed in recent decades.

=== Impact on water resource ===
Zimbabwe relies mostly on surface water resources, with limited availability of groundwater resources. The country has a significant number of dams, including large ones, with a total capacity of 99,930 m3. However, Zimbabwe's water resources are projected to be severely impacted by climate change. Rainfall simulations in various catchment areas have shown a decrease in precipitation and an increase in evaporation, leading to a projected 50% decrease in runoff by 2075. The Runde and Mzingwane catchments, in particular, are anticipated to face the largest decline in average rainfall. Additionally, wetlands and aquifers' recharge rates are expected to be reduced, impacting water availability for irrigation farming. Furthermore, the demand for water for various purposes is projected to grow due to population, urbanization, industry, and evaporation increases. According to the World Bank, climate change will result in a 38% decline in national per capita water availability by 2050, potentially forcing Zimbabwe's inhabitants to depend more on groundwater sources. Climate change affects water availability and quality, leading to challenges in securing a reliable water supply.

=== Ecosystems ===
Extreme Weather Events. Climate change in Zimbabwe has increased extreme weather events such as droughts, floods, and storms. These events disrupt ecosystems, harm crops, and contribute to soil erosion. Biodiversity Loss. The changes in temperature and precipitation patterns caused by climate change can impact the dispersal and survival of plant and animal species, leading to a decline in biodiversity in Zimbabwe's ecosystems. Zimbabwe's diverse ecosystems face threats from climate change, including loss of biodiversity, habitat destruction, and changes in vegetation.

=== Impact on people ===
Climate change impacts people in Zimbabwe through increased health risks, food insecurity, and displacement due to extreme weather events. Tropical storm Ana struck the country in January 2022, resulting in flash floods in eastern Zimbabwe. The storm caused significant damage to bridges, schools, and roads, affecting 812 households and 51 schools. As a result, over 3,000 households were displaced, with the Manicaland province being the hardest hit. Mashonaland Central and the Midlands experienced severe weather conditions from January 7 to January 11, 2023. There were six fatalities reported during this period. One person died due to flooding in Gwanda, Matabeleland South, while another fatality occurred in Mutasa, Manicaland Province. In Mazowe, Mashonaland Central province, strong winds caused significant damage, resulting in two casualties. Additionally, two individuals lost their lives due to lightning strikes in Chivi, Masvingo Province.

According to the Meteorological Services Department of Zimbabwe, Beitbridge, Matabeleland South Province recorded 109 mm of rainfall in 24 hours up to January 7. Similarly, Buhera, Manicaland Province experienced heavy rain, with 91 mm recorded within 24 hours up to January 11. In late January, the capital city, Harare, and its surroundings experienced heavy rainfall. The Meteorological Services Department reported that 123 mm of rain fell in 24 hours up to January 22. This intense rainfall led to flooding in several parts of Harare and its neighboring areas, resulting in the displacement of numerous households. In Budiriro, a southwestern suburb of Harare, the Marimba River burst its banks, causing damage to or destruction of 43 houses. Similarly, Chitungwiza in Mashonaland West experienced floods that damaged 57 houses and destroyed two others.

=== Economic impacts ===
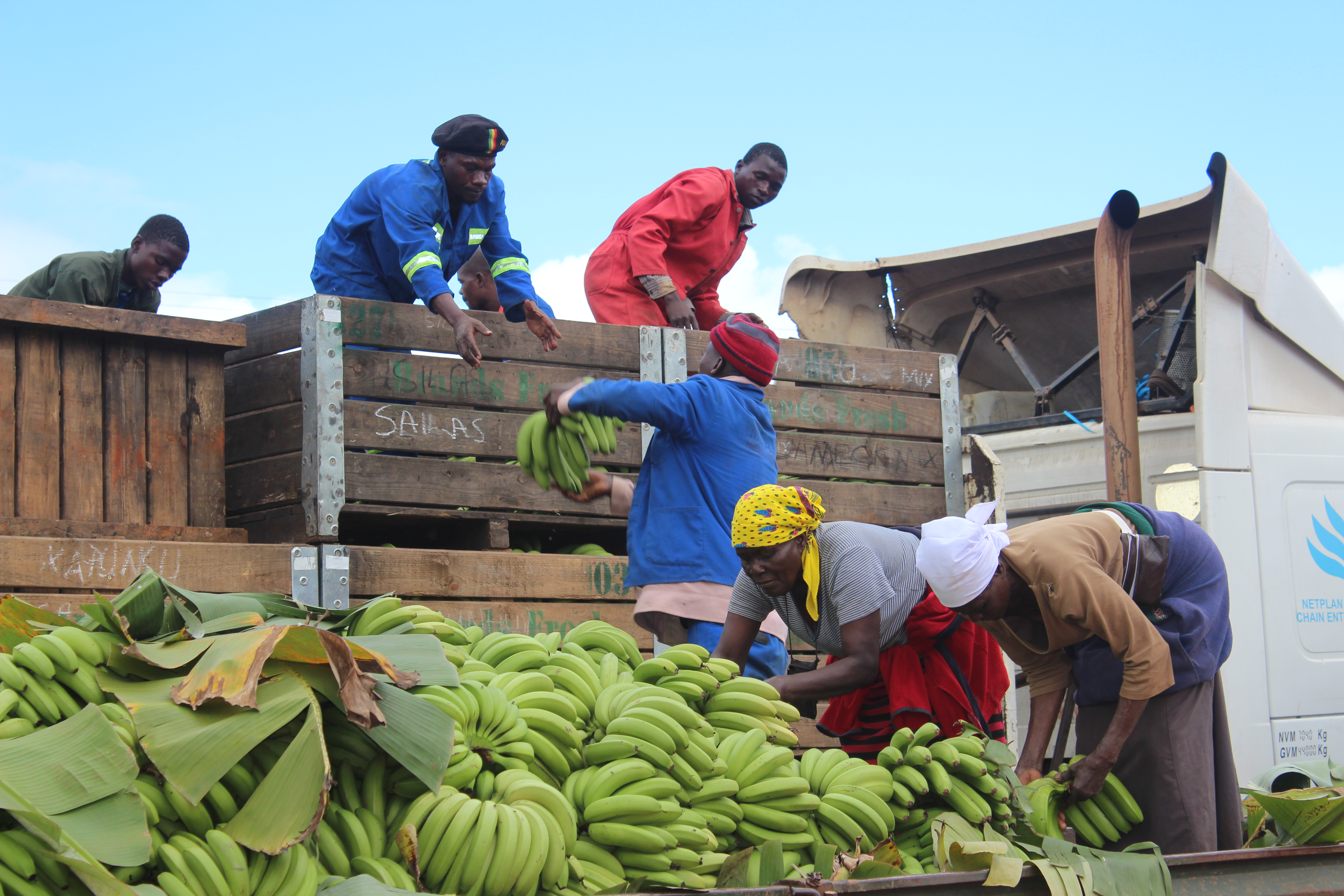
Banana farmers, Zimbabwe

The country's economy is affected by climate change, with increased costs for disaster response and reduced agricultural productivity.

=== Agriculture and livestock ===
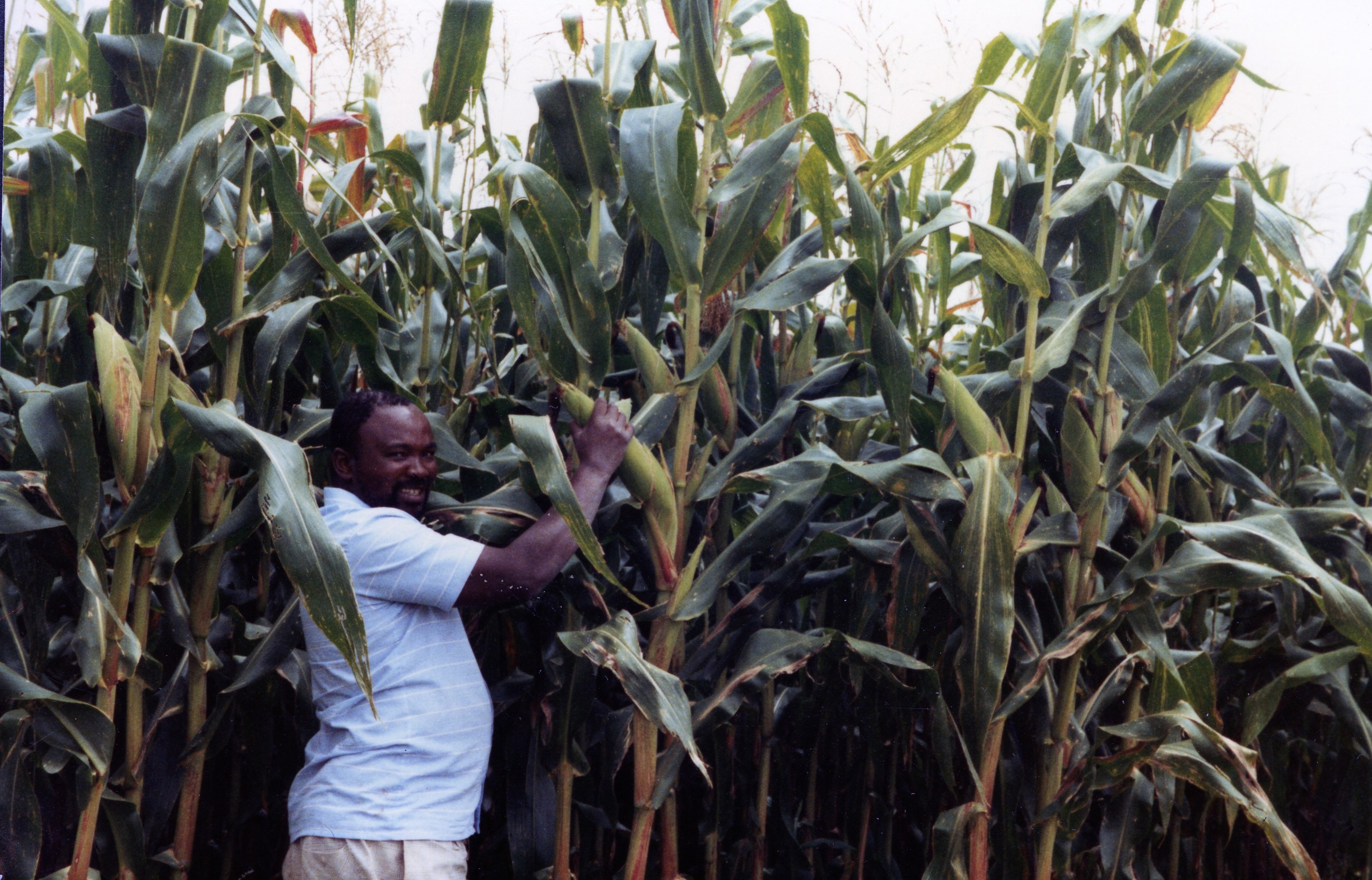
Nicholas Mukomberanwa on his farm with a typically successful maize crop

Zimbabwe's agriculture and livestock sectors face challenges from changing climate conditions, including reduced crop yields, water scarcity, and impacts on livestock production. Climate change will result in the emergence of new pests, which will have varying effects in different agricultural ecological zones (AEZs). Several climate change-related factors will contribute to increased crop loss, including reduced resistance in host plants, decreased efficacy of pesticides, and the introduction of invasive pest species. Changes in precipitation and temperature will lead to higher infestation rates of pests and more frequent disease outbreaks, consequently reducing crop and animal productivity and requiring increased expenditures on pesticides, herbicides, and veterinary drugs. A shift in pest distribution is one of the commonly observed abiotic responses to climate change. Agriculture, a critical sector of Zimbabwe's economy, is highly vulnerable to climate change. Altered climatic conditions can cause shifts in planting seasons, reduced crop yields, and water scarcity, all of which have significant effects on food security.

Area harvested, yield, and production of corn in Zimbabwe
Marketing Years	Area (1,000 Ha)	Yield (MT/Ha)	Production (1,000 MT)
2021/22	1,952	1.39	2,717
2022/23	1,901	0.76	2,717
2023/24 (estimate)	1,800	0.84	1,520

Sources: Zimbabwean Ministry of Lands, Agriculture, Water, Climate and Rural Resettlement and Post estimates.

Corn Production, Supply and Distribution
Corn Market Year Begins Zimbabwe	2021/2022		2022/2023		2023/2024	
Corn Market Year Begins Zimbabwe	May 2021		May 2022		May 2023	
Corn Market Year Begins Zimbabwe	USDA Official	New Post	USDA Official	New Post	USDA Official	New Post
Area Harvested (1000 HA)	1952	1952	1901	1901	1800	1800
Beginning Stocks(1000 MT)	94	94	711	715	414	235
Production (1000 MT)	2717	2717	1453	1453	1500	1520
MY Imports(1000 MT)	50	58	400	220	350	900
TY Imports(1000 MT)	400	400	200	200	250	500
TY Imp. from U.S. (1000 MT)	0	0	0	0	0	0
Total Supply (1000 MT)	2861	2869	2564	2388	2264	2655
MY Exports(1000 MT)	0	4	0	3	0	0
TY Exports(1000 MT)	0	0	0	0	0	0
Feed and Residual (1000 MT)	350	350	350	350	200	400
FSI Consumption (1000 MT)	1800	1800	1800	1800	1800	1800
Total Consumption (1000 MT)	2150	2150	2150	2150	2000	2200
Ending Stocks(1000 MT)	711	715	414	235	264	455
Total Distribution (1000 MT)	2861	2869	2564	2388	2264	2655
Yield (MT/HA)	1.39	1.39	0.76	0.76	0.83	0.84

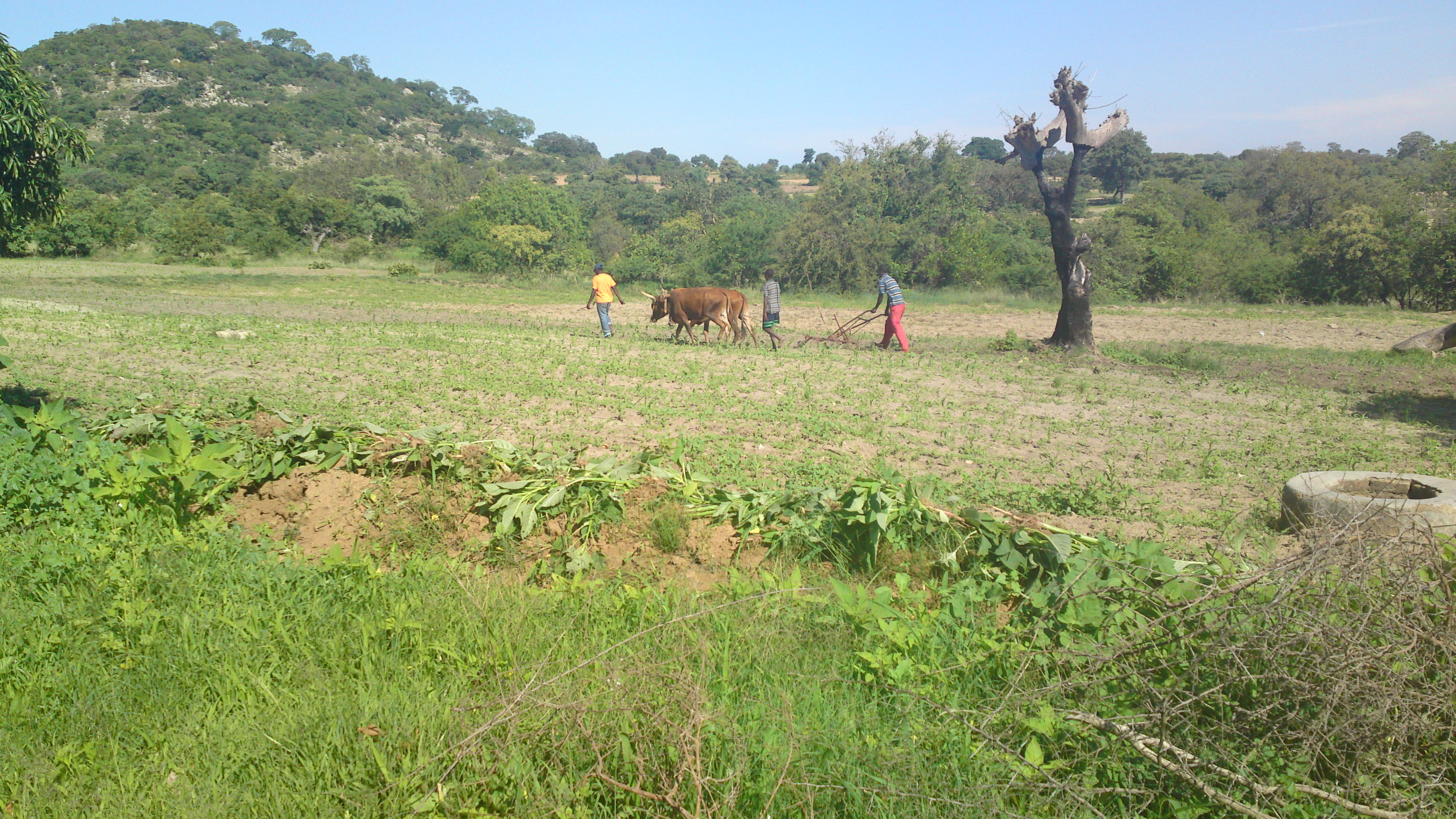
People working on the land in a village in Buhera District, Manicaland, Zimbabwe.

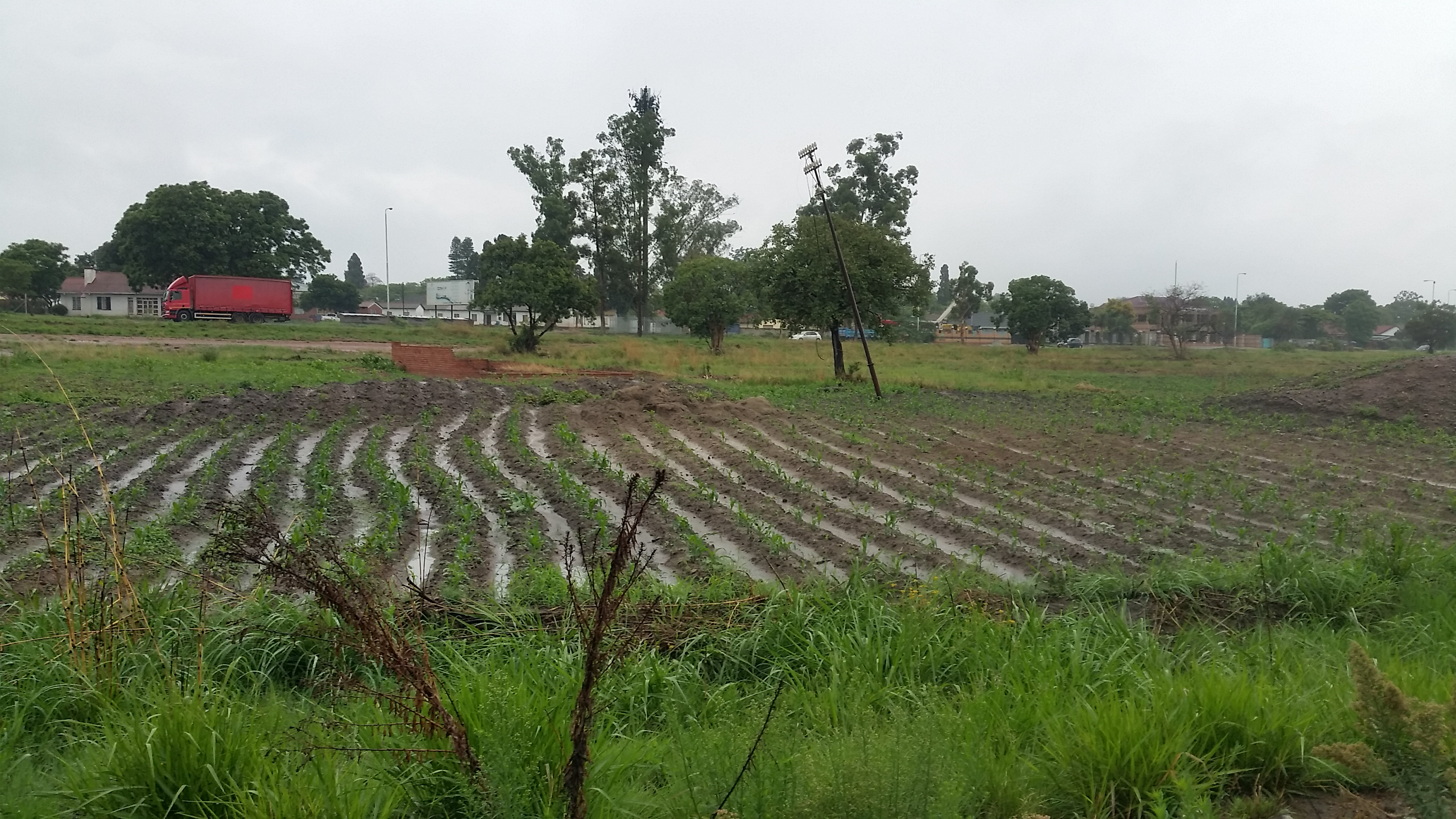
Planting season in Harare

=== Manufacturing sector ===
Extreme weather events, driven by climate change, disrupt supply chains by damaging transportation infrastructure and causing delays in the delivery of raw materials and components. This can result in production slowdowns and increased costs for manufacturers. Rising temperatures have a negative impact on worker productivity in manufacturing facilities. Heat stress and discomfort can lead to decreased efficiency and potential health issues for employees, affecting overall production.Manufacturers often rely on energy-intensive processes. Climate change mitigation efforts, such as implementing carbon pricing or regulations on greenhouse gas emissions, can result in higher energy costs, which can impact the profitability of manufacturing operations. Governments worldwide are implementing stricter environmental regulations to address climate change. Manufacturers may encounter challe nges and costs associated with complying with these new requirements.

=== Health impacts ===
Direct and indirect health impacts result from climate change, including changes in disease patterns, heat-related illnesses, and impacts on healthcare infrastructure. Rising temperatures in Zimbabwe, attributed to climate change, have led to an increased incidence of heat-related illnesses. Heat exhaustion and heatstroke are becoming more common, especially in urban areas. Climate change has expanded the range of disease vectors, such as mosquitoes, contributing to a higher prevalence of vector-borne diseases like malaria and dengue fever. These diseases pose a significant health risk. Altered precipitation patterns and reduced access to clean water sources have elevated the risk of waterborne diseases, including cholera and typhoid. Climate change-induced disruptions in agriculture and food production can result in food insecurity and malnutrition, affecting the health and nutrition of the population, particularly vulnerable groups.

== Mitigation and adaptations ==
Efforts to mitigate and adapt to climate change in Zimbabwe include the promotion of climate-smart agriculture, reducing greenhouse gas emissions, and improving water resource management.Zimbabwe is actively implementing strategies to adapt to and mitigate the impacts of climate change. Most smallholder farmers rely on food aid and utilize drought-resistant crops such as sorghum. They employ various strategies to cope with climate change, such as using short-seasoned varieties, engaging in barter trade, practicing multiple cropping, diversifying their livelihoods, implementing dry planting, and adopting early planting methods in a practice called Ethno-Science Adaptive Measures. These adaptation strategies are sustainable and preferred by smallholder farmers due to their cost-effectiveness and reliance on Indigenous Knowledge Systems (IKS).

== See also ==
- Climate change in Africa
- Effects of climate change on agriculture
- Climate change adaptation
- Agriculture in Zimbabwe
- Geography of Zimbabwe
- Health in Zimbabwe
- Ministry of Environment, Water and Climate (Zimbabwe)
