= List of constituencies of Namibia =

Politics of Namibia

The 121 Constituencies of Namibia

Each of the 14 regions of Namibia is further subdivided into electoral constituencies. The size of the constituencies varies with the size and population of each region. There are currently 121 constituencies in Namibia. The most populous constituency according to the 2011 census was Rundu Urban in the Kavango East region with 63,431 people; the least populous was Okatyali in the Oshana Region with 3,187 people.

Local councillors are directly elected through secret ballots (regional elections) by the inhabitants of their constituencies. They occupy a constituency office in the main settlement of their district. However, once elected they keep their full-time job and are expected to run their constituencies after hours. Consequently, they receive allowances rather than salaries, although the remuneration does compare to a mid-range salaried position.

Regional councillors are indirectly elected from and by the constituency councillors in each region. Each region sends three of their local councillors to represent their region in the National Council of Namibia.

== Establishment ==
The administrative division of Namibia is tabled by Boundaries Delimitation and Demarcation Commissions, short: Delimitation Commissions, and accepted or declined by the National Assembly. In 1992, the first Delimitation Commission determined the number of constituencies to be 95. Since then, every Delimitation Commission has increased this number to accommodate population growth. The fourth Delimitation Commission increased the number of constituencies to its present number in 2013. The fifth Delimitation Commission was appointed in April 2024 and is expected to submit its report in July.

Commission	Date	Members	Regions	Constituencies
1st	1992	Johan Strydom; Gerhard Tötemeyer; Martin Shipanga	13	95
2nd	1998	J.P. Karuaihe; Lazarus Hangula; Samuel Mbambo	13	102
3rd	2002	Peter Shivute; Inge Murangi; Peter Kauluma	13	107
4th	2013	Alfred Siboleka; Zedekia Ngavirue; Jonathan Steytler	14	121
5th	2024	Petrus Unengu; Prisca Anyolo; Gerhardt Gurirab; Penias Topnaar	TBD	TBD

== List of constituencies ==
Region	Constituency	Seat of the constituency office	Total Population (Namibia 2023 Census)	Notes
Erongo	Arandis	Arandis	13,545	
Erongo	Dâures	Uis	14,601	until 1998 Brandberg Constituency
Erongo	Karibib	Karibib	19,705	
Erongo	Omaruru	Omaruru	13,322	
Erongo	Swakopmund	Swakopmund	75,921	
Erongo	Walvis Bay Rural	Walvis Bay	51,497	created 1998 from a split of Walvis Bay Constituency
Erongo	Walvis Bay Urban	Walvis Bay	51,618	created 1998 from a split of Walvis Bay Constituency
Hardap	Aranos	Aranos	10,722	created 2013 from a portion of Mariental Rural
Hardap	Daweb	Maltahöhe	6,092	created 2013 from a portion of Gibeon Constituency
Hardap	Gibeon	Gibeon	8,034	
Hardap	Mariental Rural	Stampriet	12,812	
Hardap	Mariental Urban	Mariental	18,368	
Hardap	Rehoboth Rural	Schlip	9,439	
Hardap	Rehoboth Urban East	Rehoboth	29,299	
Hardap	Rehoboth Urban West	Rehoboth	11,914	
Kavango East	Mashare	Mashare	19,478	
Kavango East	Mukwe	Mukwe	39,170	
Kavango East	Ndiyona	Ndiyona	13,800	
Kavango East	Ndonga Linena	Ndonga Linena	14,936	Created 2013
Kavango East	Rundu Rural		12,405	Created 1998 as Rundu Rural from a split of Rundu Constituency. Split in 2003 into Rundu Rural East and Rundu Rural West. In 2013, when Rundu Rural West was moved to the Kavango West region and renamed Ncuncuni, Rundu Rural got its original name back.
Kavango East	Rundu Urban	Rundu	118,632	created 1998 from a split of Rundu Constituency
Kavango West	Kapako	Kapako	27,823	
Kavango West	Mankumpi	Satotwa	6,910	created 2013
Kavango West	Mpungu	Katwitwi	21,098	
Kavango West	Musese	Rupara	13,659	
Kavango West	Ncamagoro	Ncamagoro	8,449	
Kavango West	Ncuncuni		10,943	Created 2003 as Rundu Rural West from a split of Rundu Rural constituency. Renamed 2013 into Ncuncuni.
Kavango West	Nkurenkuru	Nkurenkuru	15,887	created 2013
Khomas	John Pandeni		25,457	Until 2012 Soweto
Khomas	Katutura Central		30,557	
Khomas	Katutura East		22,940	
Khomas	Khomasdal		67,211	until 2013 Khomasdal North
Khomas	Moses ǁGaroëb		68,932	Created in 2003 from a split of Hakahana Constituency
Khomas	Samora Machel		92,401	Until 2003 Wanaheda Constituency
Khomas	Tobias Hainyeko		67,067	Created in 2003 from a split of Hakahana Constituency
Khomas	Windhoek East		30,054	
Khomas	Windhoek Rural	Groot Aub	30,079	
Khomas	Windhoek West		59,907	
Kunene	Epupa		26,491	Until 1998 Ruacana Constituency. Ruacana was moved to Omusati Region, where again a Ruacana Constituency was created.
Kunene	Kamanjab	Kamanjab	11,349	
Kunene	Khorixas	Khorixas	15,506	
Kunene	Opuwo Rural	Otuani	14,894	created 2013 from a split of Opuwo Constituency
Kunene	Opuwo Urban	Opuwo	23,934	created 2013 from a split of Opuwo Constituency
Kunene	Outjo	Outjo	19,743	
Kunene	Sesfontein	Sesfontein	8,845	
Ohangwena	Eenhana	Onambutu	35,304	
Ohangwena	Endola	Oshawapala	32,698	
Ohangwena	Engela	Oshimwaku	30 004	
Ohangwena	Epembe	Epembe	16,336	
Ohangwena	Ohangwena	Helao Nafidi	31,491	
Ohangwena	Okongo	Okongo	31,746	
Ohangwena	Omulonga	Onamukulo	32,802	Created 2003
Ohangwena	Omundaungilo	Omundaungilo	15,009	
Ohangwena	Ondobe	Oshandi	32,622	
Ohangwena	Ongenga	Ongenga	27,296	
Ohangwena	Oshikango	Edundja	30,531	
Omaheke	Aminuis	Aminuis	13,801	
Omaheke	Epukiro	Epukiro Post 3	7,880	Created 2003
Omaheke	Gobabis	Gobabis	35,452	
Omaheke	Kalahari	Ben-Hur	12,021	until 1998 Buitepos Constituency
Omaheke	Otjinene	Otjinene	12,415	
Omaheke	Otjombinde	Tallismanus	9,041	until 1998 Otjozondjou Constituency
Omaheke	Okorukambe	Witvlei	12,271	until 2013 Steinhausen Constituency
Omusati	Anamulenge	Anamulenge	20,344	
Omusati	Elim	Elim	13,400	
Omusati	Etayi	Etayi	33,088	created 1998
Omusati	Ogongo	Ogongo	17,649	
Omusati	Okahao	Okahao	24,909	created 1998
Omusati	Okalongo	Okalongo	32,663	until 1998 Okalonga Constituency
Omusati	Onesi	Onesi	23,364	
Omusati	Oshikuku	Oshikuku	19,693	
Omusati	Otamanzi	Otamanzi	16,399	Created 2003
Omusati	Outapi	Outapi	53,594	until 1998 Uutapi Constituency
Omusati	Ruacana	Ruacana	27,261	Created 1998. A previous constituency with the same name was part of Kunene Region and renamed Epupa Constituency.
Omusati	Tsandi	Tsandi	34,307	
Oshana	Okaku	Okaku	21,892	
Oshana	Okatana	Okatana	19,974	
Oshana	Okatyali	Okatyali	4,502	
Oshana	Ompundja	Enguwantale	4,582	
Oshana	Ondangwa Rural	Eheke	14,959	created 2013 from a split of Ondangwa Constituency
Oshana	Ondangwa Urban	Ondangwa	31,466	created 2013 from a split of Ondangwa Constituency
Oshana	Ongwediva	Ongwediva	44,166	
Oshana	Oshakati East	Oshakati	39,915	created 1998 from a split of Oshakati Constituency
Oshana	Oshakati West	Olupumbu	30,665	created 1998 from a split of Oshakati Constituency
Oshana	Uukwiyu	Uukwiyu	13,033	
Oshana	Uuvudhiya	Engombe	5,647	
Oshikoto	Eengodi	Onamishu	24,208	
Oshikoto	Guinas	Oshivelo	8,578	
Oshikoto	Nehale lyaMpingana	Omboto	17,317	created 2013
Oshikoto	Okankolo	Onyuulaye	17,988	
Oshikoto	Olukonda	Olukonda	14,318	
Oshikoto	Omuntele	Omuntele	21,043	
Oshikoto	Omuthiyagwiipundi		39,855	
Oshikoto	Onayena	Onayena	16,669	
Oshikoto	Oniipa	Oniipa	33,727	
Oshikoto	Onyaanya	Onyaanya	25,465	until 1999 Okatope Constituency
Oshikoto	Tsumeb		38,134	until 1999 Oshikoto Constituency
Otjozondjupa	Grootfontein	Grootfontein	36,951	
Otjozondjupa	Okahandja	Okahandja	46,061	
Otjozondjupa	Okakarara	Okakarara	30,987	
Otjozondjupa	Omatako	Okandjira	18,283	
Otjozondjupa	Otavi	Otavi	18,279	
Otjozondjupa	Otjiwarongo	Otjiwarongo	54,893	
Otjozondjupa	Tsumkwe	Tsumkwe	15,357	created 1998 from the eastern part of Grootfontein Constituency
Zambezi Region	Judea Lyaboloma	Sangwali	8,738	created 2013
Zambezi Region	Kabbe North	Kabbe	12,253	created 2013 from a split of Kabbe Constituency
Zambezi Region	Kabbe South	Nakabolelwa	11,345	created 2013 from a split of Kabbe Constituency
Zambezi Region	Katima Mulilo Rural	Bukalo	24,016	created 1998 from a split of Katima Mulilo Constituency
Zambezi Region	Katima Mulilo Urban	Katima Mulilo	46,401	created 1998 from a split of Katima Mulilo Constituency
Zambezi Region	Kongola	Kongola	12,069	
Zambezi Region	Linyanti		10,425	
Zambezi Region	Sibbinda	Sibbinda	17,126	
ǁKaras	Berseba	Berseba	11,258	
ǁKaras	Karasburg East	Karasburg	13,821	created 2013 from a split of Karasburg Constituency
ǁKaras	Karasburg West	Noordoewer	17,741	created 2013 from a split of Karasburg Constituency
ǁKaras	Keetmanshoop Rural	Aroab	8,744	
ǁKaras	Keetmanshoop Urban	Keetmanshoop	27,862	
ǁKaras	ǃNamiǂNûs	Lüderitz	17,243	until 2013 Lüderitz Constituency
ǁKaras	Oranjemund	Oranjemund	13,224	
