= Rundu Rural =

Electoral constituency in the Kavango East region of north-eastern Namibia

Rundu Rural constituency (red) in the Kavango East region of Namibia

Rundu Rural (until 2013 Rundu Rural East) is an electoral constituency in the Kavango East Region of Namibia. It comprises the area east of Rundu, one of Namibia's largest cities. It had a population of 22,538 in 2011, up from 18,250 in 2001. As of 2020 the constituency had 6,060 registered voters.

The constituency contains the villages of Cuma and Kaisosi. Both villages are connected by a 60 kilometres (37 mi) gravel road which was completed in 2013.

== Establishment ==
Due to the rapid growth of Rundu, constituencies in the vicinity have undergone many changes. Rundu Rural was established in 1998 when Rundu Constituency was split into Rundu Urban and Rundu Rural. Both belonged to the Kavango Region. In 2003 this constituency was split into Rundu Rural East and Rundu Rural West.

In 2013 the Kavango Region was split into Kavango East and Kavango West. Rundu Rural East got its original name back and is now again Rundu Rural. Its former sister constituency Rundu Rural West was also renamed, to Ncuncuni Constituency. Ncuncuni now belongs to Kavango West, whereas Rundu Rural belongs to Kavango East.

== Politics ==
Rundu Rural constituency is traditionally a stronghold of the South West Africa People's Organization (SWAPO) party. In the 2004 regional election SWAPO candidate Michael Shikongo received 3,358 of the 3,759 votes cast.

In the 2015 regional elections councillor Shikongo of SWAPO was reelected with 1,284 votes. Marcellus Haivera of the All People's Party (APP) came second with 887 votes. The 2020 regional election was won by Nginga Paulus Mbangu, an independent candidate. He received 1,846 votes. The sitting councillor and SWAPO candidate Shikongo came distant second with 654 votes.

== See also ==
- Administrative divisions of Namibia
