= Rosa Kavara =

Namibian politician (1958–2018)

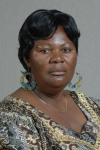
Rosa Kavara

Rosa Kunyanda Kavara (22 February 1958 – 2 January 2018) was a Namibian politician.

A member of SWAPO, she became Rundu town councillor after the 1992 local elections, the first woman to hold that post. In 2008 Kavara became councillor for Rundu Rural West in a by-election of the 2004 regional election. She was re-elected in 2010 and 2015. During her time as councillor she was elected to represent the Kavango Region, and after its split Kavango West, in the National Council of Namibia, and she served on SWAPO's central committee.

Kavara was a teacher by profession and came from the Kavango Region. Her husband died in 2016. She died on 2 January 2018 in Windhoek, age 59, from a stroke.
