= List of cities and towns in Namibia =

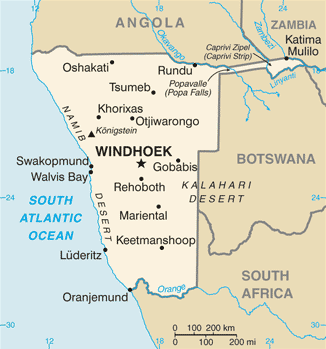
Map of Namibia

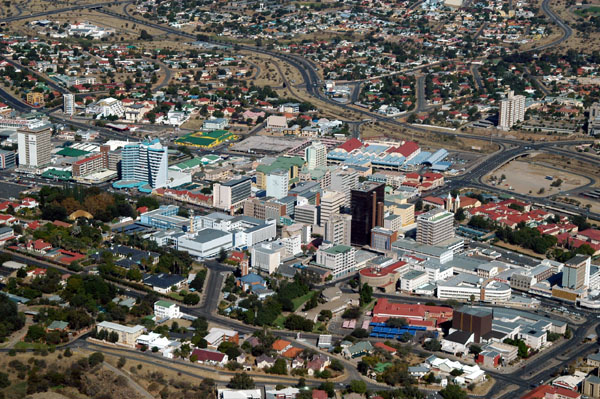
Windhoek, Capital of Namibia

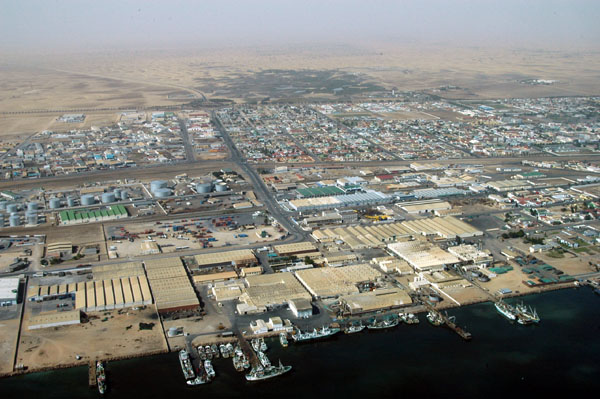
Walvis Bay

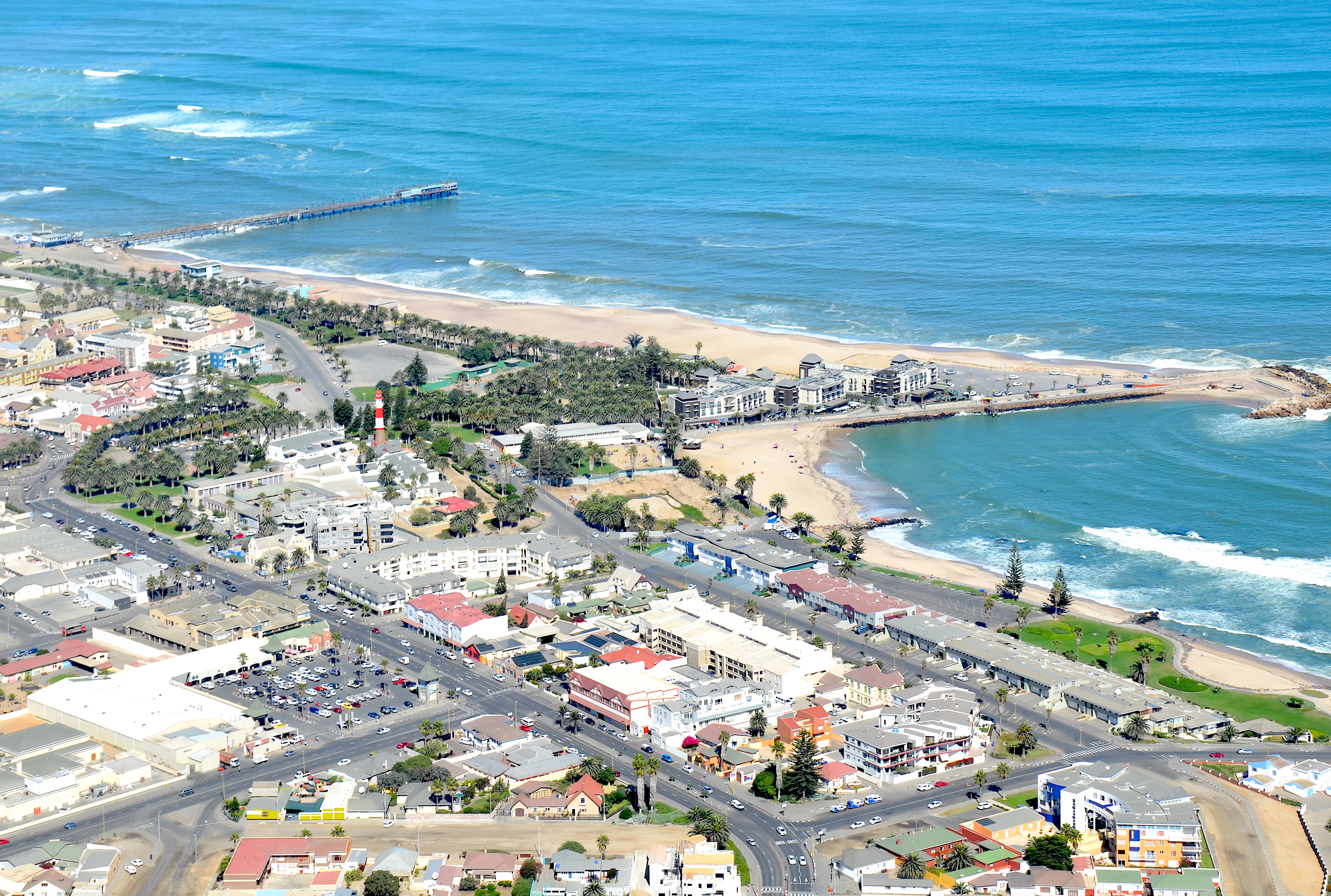
Swakopmund

Cities and towns in Namibia are distinguished by the status the Government of Namibia has vested in them: Places in Namibia that are governed by a municipality are cities, places with a town council are towns.

== Cities ==
As of 2015 Namibia has thirteen cities, each of them governed by a municipality council that has between 7 and 15 seats. Compared to towns, cities have the authority to set up facilities like public transport, housing schemes, museums, and libraries without the approval of the Minister of Urban and Rural Development. They may also decide to privatise certain services and to enter into joint ventures with the private sector without asking for explicit approval. The thirteen cities are:

Cities in Namibia
City	Region	Census 1991	Census 2001	Census 2011	Census 2023
Windhoek	Khomas	147,056	233,529	325,858	486,169
Walvis Bay	Erongo	22,999	43,611	62,096	102,704
Swakopmund	Erongo	17,681	23,808	44,725	75,921
Henties Bay	Erongo		3,285	4,720	7,569
Omaruru	Erongo		4,761	6,300	10,670
Otjiwarongo	Otjozondjupa	15,921	19,614	28,249	49,022
Okahandja	Otjozondjupa	11,040	14,039	22,639	45,159
Grootfontein	Otjozondjupa		14,249	16,632	26,839
Mariental	Hardap		9,836	12,478	15,475
Outjo	Kunene		6,013	8,445	15,063
Gobabis	Omaheke		13,856	19,101	33,404
Tsumeb	Oshikoto		14,929	19,275	34,960
Keetmanshoop	ǁKaras	15,032	15,778	20,977	27,862

== Towns ==
As of 2015 Namibia has 26 towns, each of them governed by a town council that has between 7 and 12 seats. Compared to villages, towns have the authority to set up facilities like ambulance and fire fighting services and electricity supply without the approval of the Minister of Urban and Rural Development. They are also responsible for erecting and maintaining community buildings, and they may buy and sell movable property without asking for explicit approval. The 26 towns are:

Towns in Namibia
Town	Region	Census 1991	Census 2001	Census 2011	2023 Census
Karasburg	ǁKaras		4,075	4,401	6,621
Lüderitz	ǁKaras		13,295	12,537	16,125
Oranjemund	ǁKaras		4,451	3,908	7,441
Arandis	Erongo		3,974	5,214	5,726
Karibib	Erongo		3,726	5,132	6,938
Usakos	Erongo		2,926	3,583	5,094
Aranos	Hardap			3,683	5,493
Rehoboth	Hardap	21,439	21,308	28,843	40,788
Rundu	Kavango East	19,366	36,964	63,431	118,625
Nkurenkuru	Kavango West			618	10,261
Khorixas	Kunene		5,890	6,796	9,371
Opuwo	Kunene		5,101	7,657	12,335
Eenhana	Ohangwena		2,814	5,528	16,588
Helao Nafidi	Ohangwena	---	--- (established 2004)	19,375	28,508
Okahao	Omusati			1,665	4,519
Oshikuku	Omusati			2,761	5,499
Outapi	Omusati		2,640	6,437	13,671
Ruacana	Omusati			2,985	5,939
Oshakati	Oshana	21,603	28,255	36,541	58,696
Ondangwa	Oshana	7,926	10,900	22,822	30,679
Ongwediva	Oshana	6,197	10,742	20,260	27,784
Omuthiya	Oshikoto			3,794	7,560
Oniipa	Oshikoto			---	4,740
Okakarara	Otjozondjupa		3,296	4,709	7,123
Otavi	Otjozondjupa		3,813	5,242	10,756
Katima Mulilo	Zambezi	13,377	22,134	28,362	46,401

== See also ==
- List of villages and settlements in Namibia
- Geography of Namibia
- Regions of Namibia
