= Rundu Urban =

Electoral constituency in the Kavango East region of north-eastern Namibia

Coordinates: 17°56′S 19°46′E

Rundu Urban constituency (red) in the Kavango East region of Namibia

Rundu Urban is an electoral constituency in the Kavango East region of Namibia. It covers the urban area of Rundu, the region's capital and one of Namibia's largest cities. The constituency also covers parts of the Sauyemwa, Safari, Tutungeni, Katutura, Donkerhoek and Kehemu neighborhoods. It had a population of 20,953 in 2011, up from 19,173 in 2001. As of 2020 the constituency had 35,740 registered voters.

In 2013 the Kavango Region of which Rundu was the capital, was split into Kavango East and Kavango West. Rundu became the capital of Kavango East, and Rundu Urban also belongs to this region.

== Politics ==
Rundu is traditionally a stronghold of the South West Africa People's Organization (SWAPO) party. Ambrosius Haingura, a prominent internal SWAPO organizer prior to independence, was the first councillor elected to represent Rundu Urban in the 1992 regional elections. He was re-elected in 1998 and served until his death in September 2000.

In the 2004 regional elections Nimrod Muremi (SWAPO), an agriculturalist, was elected councillor. He received 5,960 of the 6,057 votes cast. The 2010 regional elections were contested by incumbent Muremi (SWAPO), Sabine Kapango Dos Santos of All People's Party (APP), Vaino Sipete Matende of Rally for Democracy and Progress (RDP) and Thimotheus Kashindereki. Councillor Muremi was reelected with 75% of all votes. The 2015 regional elections were again a landslide win for SWAPO. Victoria Mbawo Kauma received 7,738 votes while Ladislaus Poroto Shindimba of the APP received 1,202 votes. The election was also contested by candidates of RDP and the Democratic Turnhalle Alliance (DTA). Kauma was re-elected in the 2020 regional election, winning with 4,731 votes, 70% of the total. Several other candidates contested the election, none of them obtaining 10% of the votes cast.

== See also ==
- Administrative divisions of Namibia
