= Ncuncuni Constituency =

Electoral constituency in the Kavango West region of northern Namibia

Coordinates: 17°56′S 19°46′E

Ncuncuni constituency (orange, right) in the Kavango West region of Namibia

Ncuncuni (until 2013: Rundu Rural West) is a constituency in the Kavango West region of Namibia. It is located west of Rundu, one of Namibia's largest cities. It had a population of 38,281 in 2011, up from 26,623 in 2001. As of 2020 the constituency had 4,554 registered voters.

== Establishment ==
Due to the rapid growth of Rundu, constituencies in the vicinity have undergone many changes. In 2003 this constituency was established in the Kavango Region as Rundu Rural West through a split of the Rundu Rural constituency.

In 2013 the Kavango Region was split into Kavango East and Kavango West. The constituency was renamed Ncuncuni; It belongs to Kavango West. Its former sister constituency Rundu Rural East belongs to Kavango East and was also renamed. It got its original name back and is now again Rundu Rural.

== Politics ==
Ncuncuni constituency is traditionally a stronghold of the South West Africa People's Organization (SWAPO) party. In the 2004 regional election SWAPO candidate Herbert Shixwameni received 5,134 of the 5,784 votes cast. He resigned in 2008 when he left SWAPO to form the All People's Party (APP) with his younger brother, Ignatius. In the resulting by-election in 2008, Rosa Kavara, also of SWAPO, became constituency councillor. Kavara was re-elected in the 2010 regional election, winning over Herbert Shixwameni (now APP) and Moses Nyundu of the Rally for Democracy and Progress (RDP). Kavara was subsequently elected to represent the Kavango Region in the National Council of Namibia as one of 7 women on the 24 person body.

As in all Kavango West constituencies, SWAPO won the 2015 regional election by a landslide. Incumbent Rosa Kavara received 1,159 votes, followed by Valerianus Ndango Haupindi (APP, 380 votes). Councillor Kavara died in January 2008. A by-election was held that was won by Ritha Sindjanga (SWAPO, 1097 votes), Paulus Mangundu of the APP came second with 355 votes. The 2020 regional election likewise went to SWAPO. Its candidate Leopoldine Nseu received 864 votes, far ahead of Protasius Shihwameni of the APP with 262 votes.

== See also ==
- Administrative divisions of Namibia
