= Musese Constituency =

Electoral constituency in the Kavango West region of northern Namibia

Musese constituency (centre top, in red) in the Kavango West region of Namibia

Musese is a constituency in the Kavango West region of Namibia. The administrative capital is the settlement of Rupara. As of 2020 the constituency had 6,494 registered voters.

In 2013 the Kavango Region was split into Kavango East and Kavango West. Musese was formed from the north-eastern part of the former Kahenge Constituency.

== Politics ==
As in all Kavango West constituencies, SWAPO won the 2015 regional election by a landslide. Sakeus Kudumo received 2,582 votes, followed by Raphael Kapumburu of the All People's Party (APP, 213 votes). The 2020 regional election was also won by the SWAPO candidate. Kosmas Katura gained 1,628 votes. Vilho Kangumbe of the Popular Democratic Movement (PDM) came distant second with 201 votes.

== See also ==
- Administrative divisions of Namibia
