= Nkurenkuru Constituency =

Electoral constituency in the Kavango West region of northern Namibia

Coordinates: 17.6777°S 18.5718°E

Nkurenkuru constituency (violet, top left) in the Kavango West region of Namibia

Nkurenkuru Constituency is an electoral constituency in the Kavango West Region of Namibia. It was created in August 2013, following a recommendation of the Fourth Delimitation Commission of Namibia, and in preparation of the 2014 general election. The administrative centre of Nkurenkuru Constituency is the town of Nkurenkuru. Before the administrative change in 2013 the area of this constituency, including the town of Nkurenkuru, was part of Mpungu Constituency in the Kavango Region.

== Politics ==
As in all Kavango West constituencies, SWAPO won the 2015 regional election by a landslide. Damian Haikera Nakambare received 1,936 votes, followed by Markus Hambyuka of the Rally for Democracy and Progress (RDP, 79 votes). For the 2020 regional election no opposition candidate was fielded, and Tenga Fillipus Ndara, the SWAPO candidate, was duly elected.

== See also ==
- Administrative divisions of Namibia
