= List of Namibian regions by Human Development Index =

This is a list of Namibian regions by Human Development Index as of 2023.

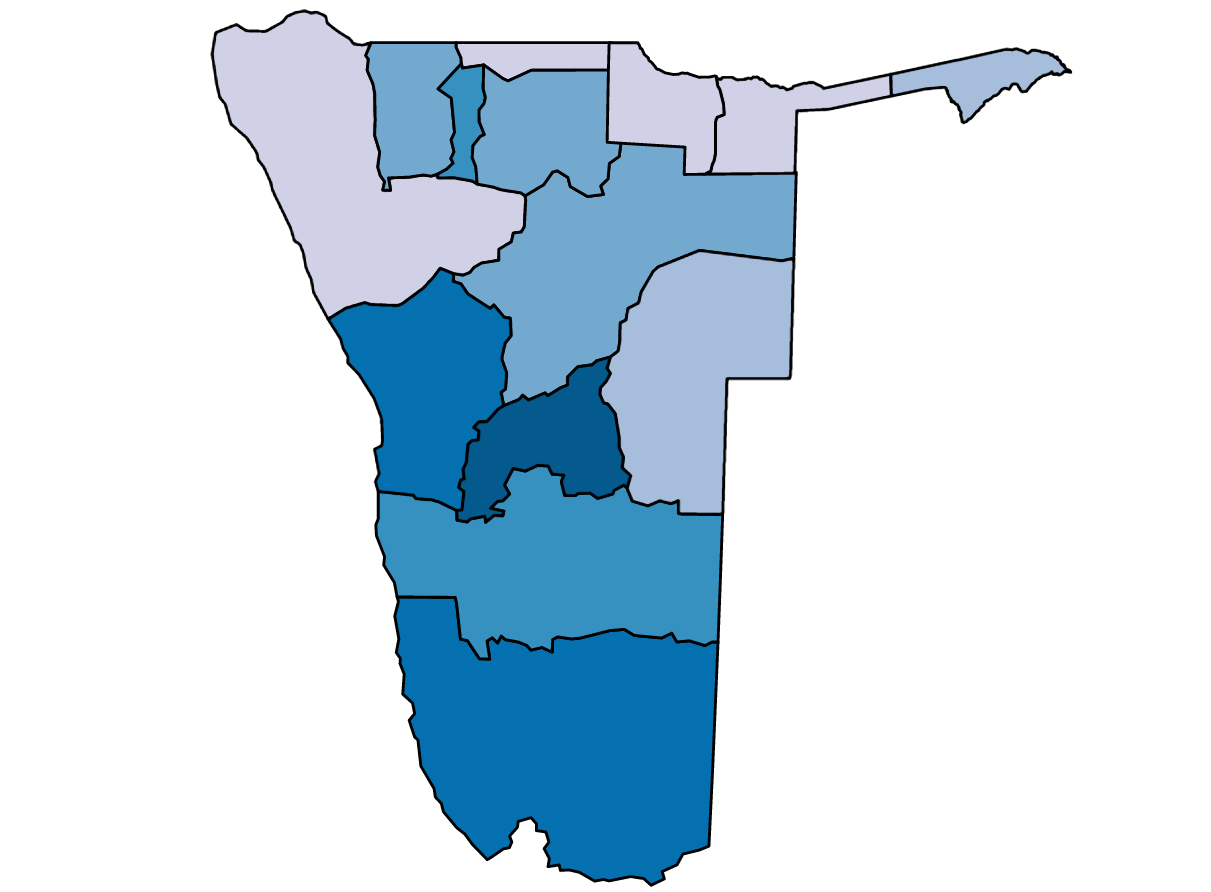
Regions of Namibia by HDI in 2018.732-.700.699-.670.669-.640.639-.610.609-.580.579-.550

Note: the HDI values are calculated using the pre-2013 regional borders, so the Kavango Region is included in the data which represents the current Kavango East and Kavango West regions.

Rank	Region	HDI (2023)
High human development
1	Khomas	0.758
2	Erongo	0.718
3	Karas	0.701
Medium human development
4	Oshana	0.684
5	Hardap	0.684
–	Namibia (average)	0.665
6	Otjozondjupa	0.655
7	Omusati	0.633
8	Oshikoto	0.632
9	Zambezi	0.626
10	Omaheke	0.610
11	Kunene	0.589
12	Ohangwena	0.587
13	Kavango	0.569
