= Ndiyona Constituency =

Electoral constituency in the Kavango East region of north-eastern Namibia

Coordinates: 18°S 20.7°E

Ndiyona constituency (red) in the Kavango East region of Namibia

Ndiyona is a constituency in the Kavango East region of Namibia. The district centre is the settlement of Ndiyona. It had a population of 20,633 in 2011, up from 19,565 in 2001. As of 2020 the constituency had 6,210 registered voters.

Ndiyona constituency until 2013 belonged to the Kavango Region. In 2013, following a recommendation of the Fourth Delimitation Commission of Namibia, and in preparation of the 2014 general election, the Kavango Region was split into Kavango East and Kavango West. The new Ndonga Linena Constituency was created from the western part of Ndiyona, so that Ndiyona is now much smaller than before. Both constituencies belong to Kavango East.

== Politics ==
Ndiyona constituency is traditionally a stronghold of the South West Africa People's Organization (SWAPO) party. In the 2004 regional election SWAPO candidate Sebastiaan Karupu received 5,870 of the 6,716 votes cast.

The 2015 regional elections were won by Swapo party candidate Eugen Likuwa with 1,859 votes. Florian Haingura of the All People's Party (APP) came second with 293 votes. The SWAPO candidate also won the 2020 regional election. Laurentius Mukoya obtained 1,874 votes, far ahead of Stefanus Likuwa (APP, 172 votes).

== See also ==
- Administrative divisions of Namibia
