= Katima Mulilo Urban =

Electoral constituency in Namibia's Zambezi Region

Coordinates: 17°30′S 24°17′E

- Constituency
- Katima Mulilo Urban constituency (red) in the Zambezi Region
- Region: Zambezi Region
- Population: 46401
- Major settlements: Katima Mulilo
- Area: 44.94 km²

Current constituency
- Created: 1998
- Created from: Katima Mulilo Constituency

Katima Mulilo Urban is a constituency in Namibia's Zambezi Region. It comprises most of the townlands of the region's capital, Katima Mulilo. The constituency has a population of 46,401 people, covers an area of 44.94 km², and has a population density of 1,033/km².

Katima Mulilo Urban Constituency was established in 1998 following the recommendation of the Second Delimitation Commission of Namibia. The former Katima Mulilo Constituency was divided into Katima Mulilo Rural and Katima Mulilo Urban Constituencies in preparation for the 1998 general election.

== Politics ==
Katima Mulilo is traditionally a stronghold of the South West Africa People's Organization (SWAPO) party. In the 2004 regional election, SWAPO candidate Bernard Sibalatani received 3,751 of the 4,847 votes cast.

Councillor Sibalatani (SWAPO) was re-elected in 2015 with 2,267 votes. His closest competitor, Robert Tariso Matongela of the Rally for Democracy and Progress (RDP), received 278 votes. Independent candidate Linus Lifasi Muchila came third with 239 votes, while Fred Waluka Mola of the Democratic Turnhalle Alliance (DTA) finished last with 154 votes.

In the 2020 regional election there were 13,860 registered voters. John Muchila Mukaya (SWAPO) was elected as Katima Mulilo Urban Constituency councillor with 1,831 votes. Mweti Marklee Matengu (PDM) came second with 557 votes, followed by independent candidate Poniso Shrunk Kubwima, who received 369 votes.

=== National elections ===
In the 2004 presidential election, Katima Mulilo Urban voted overwhelmingly for Hifikepunye Pohamba (SWAPO). With approximately 72% of the vote, Pohamba earned about the same percentage as he did nationally. However, the constituency voted strongly for Ben Ulenga of the Congress of Democrats (CoD), who received 1299 (17%) votes, which was more than 10% higher than his national vote total.
