= Uukwiyu Constituency =

Electoral constituency in the Oshana region of northern Namibia

Coordinates: 18°1′S 15°55′E

Uukwiyu constituency (red) in the Oshana Region

Uukwiyu Constituency is an electoral constituency in the Oshana Region of Namibia. It had 6,620 registered voters in 2020. Its district capital is the settlement of Uukwiyu. Uukwiyu Constituency covers an area of 300 km^{2} (120 sq mi). It had a population of 12,092 in 2011, up from 12,047 in 2001.

== Politics ==
Uukwiyu constituency is traditionally a stronghold of the South West Africa People's Organization (SWAPO) party. In the 2004 regional election SWAPO candidate Petrus Luaadhy Shiwedha received 3,829 of the 3,870 votes cast.

In the 2010 regional elections, SWAPO's Andreas Amundjindi won the constituency with 3,701 votes. His only challenger was Salmi Benjameni of the Rally for Democracy and Progress (RDP), who received 48 votes. In the 2015 local and regional elections Amundjindi won uncontested and remained councillor after no opposition party nominated a candidate. Councillor Amundjindi (SWAPO) was re-elected in the 2020 regional election. He received 2,406 votes, followed by Johannes Shigwedha of the Independent Patriots for Change (IPC), an opposition party formed in August 2020, with 914 votes.
