= Mpungu Constituency =

Electoral constituency in the Kavango West region of northern Namibia

Coordinates: 17°40′S 18°14′E

Mpungu constituency (yellow, left) in the Kavango West region of Namibia

Mpungu is a constituency in the Kavango West region of Namibia. It had a population of 20,787 in 2011, up from 18,660 in 2001, and 9,121 registered voters in 2020, up from 8,924 in 2004.

The settlements of Mpungu and Mukekete are situated in this constituency. Before August 2013 the town of Nkurenkuru belonged to Mpungu constituency, and the constituency was situated in the Kavango Region. Following a recommendation of the Fourth Delimitation Commission of Namibia, and in preparation of the 2014 general election, the Kavango Region was split into Kavango East and Kavango West. Nkurenkuru Constituency was created from the area of Mpungu. Both constituencies belong to Kavango West.

== Politics ==
Mpungu constituency is traditionally a stronghold of the South West Africa People's Organization (SWAPO) party. In the 2004 regional election SWAPO candidate David Hamutenya received 5,960 of the 6,057 votes cast.

As in all Kavango West constituencies, SWAPO won the 2015 regional election by a landslide. Titus Kandjimi Shiudifonya received 4,354 votes, followed by Elia Hambjuka of the Rally for Democracy and Progress (RDP, 163 votes) and Festus Shimuhefereni Hamukwaya of the All People's Party (APP, 78 votes). Shiudifonya was re-elected in the 2020 regional election, gaining more than 97% of the votes.

== See also ==
- Administrative divisions of Namibia
