= Kapako Constituency =

Electoral constituency in the Kavango West region of northern Namibia

Coordinates: 17°54′S 19°34′E

Kapako constituency (yellow, top right) in the Kavango West region of Namibia

Kapako is a constituency in the Kavango West region of Namibia. The district centre is the settlement of Kapako. It had a population of 26,983 in 2011, up from 26,263 in 2001.

Kapako constituency until 2013 belonged to the Kavango Region. In 2013, following a recommendation of the Fourth Delimitation Commission of Namibia, and in preparation of the 2014 general election, the Kavango Region was split into Kavango East and Kavango West. The new Ncamangoro Constituency was created from the southern part of Kapako, so that Kapako is now much smaller than before. Both constituencies belong to Kavango West.

== Politics ==
Kapako constituency is traditionally a stronghold of the South West Africa People's Organization (SWAPO) party. In the 2004 regional election SWAPO candidate Frieda Mwadina Siwombe received 6,244 of the 6,811 votes cast.

As in all Kavango West constituencies, SWAPO won the 2015 regional election by a landslide. Johannes Hamba Karondo received 4,600 votes, followed by Modestus Karupu Hamutenya of the Democratic Turnhalle Alliance (DTA, 194 votes) and Alex Siremo of the All People's Party (APP, 178 votes). For the 2020 regional election, no opposition party nominated a candidate. The sitting councillor Karondo was duly re-elected.

== See also ==
- Administrative divisions of Namibia
