= Mashare =

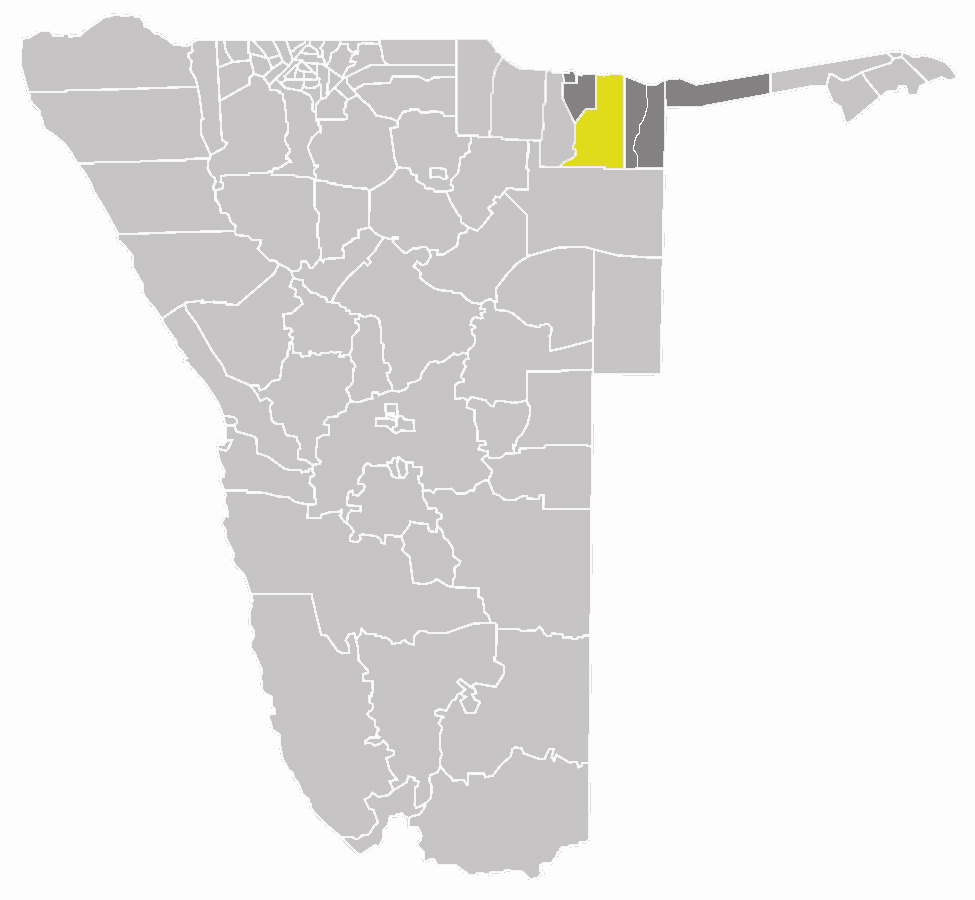
Location of Mashare constituency (yellow) in the Kavango Region (dark grey) of Namibia

Mashare is a settlement in the Kavango East Region of Namibia, just east of Rundu, the regional capital. It is the district capital of Mashare Constituency.

The settlement hosted a leprosarium until the early 1980s when the Namibian War of Independence led to its closure. The hospital accommodated thousands of patients with leprosy from Namibia, Angola, and Botswana. Until today, Mashare is home to the biggest community of leprosy patients in Namibia who live together voluntarily due to their shared experience of stigma and isolation.
