= Mankumpi Constituency =

Electoral constituency in the Kavango West region of northern Namibia

Mankumpi constituency (violet, bottom centre) in the Kavango West region of Namibia

Mankumpi Constituency is an electoral constituency in the Kavango West Region of Namibia. The administrative centre is the village of Satotwa. Mankumpi was created in August 2013, following a recommendation of the Fourth Delimitation Commission of Namibia, and in preparation of the 2014 general election. It was formed from the south-eastern part of the former Kahenge Constituency.

== Politics ==
As in all Kavango West constituencies, SWAPO won the 2015 regional election by a landslide. Lukas Sinimbo Muha received 1,335 votes, followed by Frans Kandjembo Muremi of the All People's Party (APP, 66 votes). For the 2020 regional election no opposition candidate was fielded, and the sitting SWAPO councillor was duly re-elected. Muha was subsequently elected to be one of the three councillors representing Kavango West in the National Council of Namibia, and the National Council elected him as its fifth chairperson.

== See also ==
- Administrative divisions of Namibia
