= Okakarara =

- Town
- Nickname: Erari
- Motto: Risa ukute
- Location in Namibia
- Coordinates: 20°35′9″S 17°27′28″E
- Country: Namibia
- Region: Otjozondjupa Region
- Constituencies of Namibia: Okakarara Constituency

Government
  - Mayor: Erenfriede Veundja Kamutuezu

Population (2023)
  - Total: 7,123
- Time zone: UTC+2 (SAST)
- Climate: BSh

Okakarara is a town in Otjozondjupa Region, Namibia, located 50 kilometres (31 mi) southeast of Waterberg National Park. It had a population of 7,123 in 2023, up from 3,269 in 2001.

Okakarara consists of the residential areas of Pamue, the former whites-only area, and Okakarara Proper, the former black residential area. It is the district capital of the Okakarara electoral constituency that includes surrounding settlements.

== History ==
The first house was built by Salathiel Kambamba Kambazembi and Reinard Tjerije who arrived in the area in 1923. The settlement grew over time and was proclaimed a town in 1992. Okakarara became the centre of the Herero Tribal Authority in the early 1970s.

Historical population
Year	Pop.	±% p.a.
2001	3,296	—
2011	4,709	+3.63%
2023	7,123	+3.51%

== Economy and infrastructure ==
The town further features a secondary school, a government hospital, a vocational training centre, and an abattoir.

Since 2007, Okakarara hosts the annual Okakarara trade fair, a four-day event to bring the breeders of the communal land area around the town together to showcase the animsale of cakes, a trade centre and an SME park.

To earn a living, small entrepreneurs earn their living through the selling of various items and services.

One of the higher educational services is offered at the Okakarara Senior Secondary School. Additional higher tertiary education is also offered at the Okakarara Vocational Training Center.

== Politics ==
=== Local authority elections ===
Okakarara is governed by a town council that has seven seats. Formerly part of the Apartheid-era bantustan Hereroland, the area is still mainly populated by the Herero people. Because of this, Okakarara is one of the few towns in Namibia where the otherwise dominant SWAPO party faces considerable opposition.

The first local election run after Namibian independence, the 1992 local elections, was won by the Democratic Turnhalle Alliance (DTA) which obtained 949 votes and gained five seats. SWAPO came second with 295 votes and two seats. The 1998 local authority elections saw a similar result. DTA won and gained six seats (795 votes), SWAPO gained the remaining seat with 167 votes.

In the 2004 elections, SWAPO came only second, and the Herero-dominated National Unity Democratic Organisation (NUDO) won. Due to a very unusual coalition between SWAPO and DTA the then elected town mayor Ehrnst Katjiku had SWAPO affiliation. The 2015 local authority election was again won by NUDO which gained three seats and 842 votes. SWAPO came second with 538 votes and gained two seats, and the DTA also gained two seats with 483 votes. NUDO also won the 2020 local authority election. It obtained 642 votes and gained two seats. Also at two seats each were the Popular Democratic Movement (PDM, the new name of the DTA) with 535 votes and SWAPO with 375 votes. The remaining seat went to the Landless People's Movement (LPM, an opposition party formed in 2016) with 365 votes.

=== Mayors ===
- 2010 – 2012 MZ Tjiho (DTA)
- 2013 – 2015 John Viakondo
- 2016 – 2018 Olga Tjiurutue (PDM)
- 2018 – 2020 Veundjua Kamutuezu

=== Twin towns ===
Okakarara has twinning agreements with the following Namibian towns:

- Grootfontein
- Ongwediva
- Otjiwarongo
- Outapi
- Outjo
- Rehoboth
- Tsumeb
- Windhoek

== Notable residents ==
- Zedekia Ngavirue, diplomat
- Ngarikutuke Tjiriange, former Namibian Minister of Justice

== In popular culture ==
Okakarara is named as the venue for the "ECACL conference" that Ann Taylor has the honour of attending in the 1989 film The Gods Must Be Crazy II.
