= Ndonga Linena Constituency =

Electoral constituency in the Kavango East region of north-eastern Namibia

Ndonga Linena (red) constituency in the Kavango East region of Namibia

Ndonga Linena Constituency is an electoral constituency in the Kavango East Region of Namibia. It was created in August 2013, following a recommendation of the Fourth Delimitation Commission of Namibia, and in preparation of the 2014 general election. The administrative centre of Ndonga Linena Constituency is the settlement of Ndonga Linena. Ndonga Linena was formed from the western part of the Ndiyona Constituency. As of 2020 the constituency had 6,597 registered voters.

== Politics ==
The 2015 regional elections were won by Petrus Muyenga Kavhura of SWAPO. He received 2,623 votes. Nelson Joseph Murora of the Democratic Turnhalle Alliance (DTA) came second with 225 votes. The SWAPO candidate also won the 2020 regional election. Michael Shiwana Kampota obtained 1,073 votes, narrowly ahead of Balthazar Daniel Djami of the All People's Party (APP), who obtained 1,061 votes.

== See also ==
- Administrative divisions of Namibia
