= Samuel Mbambo =

Namibian politician, theologian and academic

Rev. Samuel Kaveto Mbambo (born in Kavango Region) is a Namibian politician, diplomat, theologian, historian, and academic. He was a governor of the Kavango Region, and after its split into Kavango West and Kavango East, also of these new entities. He also served as Namibia's ambassador to the Russian Federation as well as its high commissioner to India.

Mbambo was appointed governor of Namibia's Kavango Region in April 2013, succeeding Maurus Nekaro. When the Fourth Delimitation Commission of Namibia, responsible for recommending on the country's administrative divisions suggested in August 2013 to split the Kavango Region into two, creating the new regions of Kavango East and Kavango West, Mbambo was for a few months governor of both. In April 2014 Sirkka Ausiku was appointed governor of Kavango West while Mbambo continued as governor of Kavango East. His term expired in 2020, and he was not reappointed. Mbambo is a long-term SWAPO member and was elected to its central committee in 2021.

Mbambo is a pastor in the Evangelical Reformed Church of Africa and President of the Council of Churches in Namibia.
