= Ogongo Constituency =

Electoral constituency in the Omusati region of northern Namibia

Coordinates: 17°40′S 15°17′E

Ogongo Constituency (red) in the Omusati Region

Ogongo Constituency is an electoral constituency in the Omusati Region northern part of Namibia. It had 9,140 registered voters in 2020. Its district capital is the settlement of Ogongo.

The constituency covers an area of 807 km^{2} (312 sq mi). It had a population of 19,546 in 2011, down from 19,611 in 2001. Ogongo Constituency contains the settlements of Eengolo, Eendombe, Pyamukuyu, Iipanda, Ombathi, and Omuthitu.

University of Namibia has one of its agricultural campuses near Ogongo, which specialises in crop science and forestry.

== Politics ==
Like all other constituencies in Omusati, Ogongo constituency is traditionally a stronghold of the South West Africa People's Organization (SWAPO) party. The 2004 regional election was won by SWAPO politician Sackarias Uugwanga Kayone. He received 6,571 of the 6,655 votes cast.

SWAPO also won the 2015 regional election by a landslide. Wilhelm Iiyambo gained 4,392 votes, while Josua Nghishiikoh of the Rally for Democracy and Progress (RDP) gained only 45. The SWAPO candidate won the 2020 regional election by a large margin. Daniel Iilende obtained 3,703 votes, followed by independent candidate Johannes Nakale with 245 votes and Tataati Komeya of the Independent Patriots for Change (IPC), an opposition party formed in August 2020, with 149 votes.
