= Oshana Region =

Coordinates: 18°10′S 15°45′E

- Region
- Location of the Oshana Region in Namibia
- Country: Namibia
- Capital: Oshakati

Government
  - Governor: Hofni Iipinge

Area
  - Total: 8,647 km^{2} (3,339 sq mi)

Population (2023 census)
  - Total: 230,801
  - Density: 26.69/km^{2} (69.13/sq mi)
- Time zone: UTC+2 (CAT)
- HDI (2017): 0.669 medium · 4th
- Website: oshanarc.gov.na

Oshana is one of the fourteen regions of Namibia; its capital is Oshakati. The towns of Oshakati, Ongwediva , and Ondangwa, all situated with this region, form an urban cluster with the second largest population concentration in Namibia after the capital Windhoek. As of 2020, Oshana had 113,112 registered voters.

== Geography ==
Oshana is one of only three Namibian regions without either a coastline or a foreign border. It borders the following regions:

- Ohangwena - north
- Oshikoto - east
- Kunene - south
- Omusati - west

The name Oshana refers to the most prominent landscape feature in the area: shallow, seasonally inundated depressions that underpin the local agroecological system. Although communications are hindered during the rainy season, the fish that breed in the Oshana provide an important source of dietary protein.

== Economy and infrastructure ==
The Oshakati-Ongwediva-Ondangwa complex has experienced dramatic urban growth in recent years and forms an important commercial and potential industrial focus. As a whole, it forms the second largest population concentration in Namibia after Windhoek, but it still lacks basic infrastructure and most of the services and facilities normally found in urban areas of this size. The majority of businesses in northern Namibia are located here, providing a significant amount of employment. However, urbanisation is continuing within the region.

The area is far more densely populated in the north, which is linked to Tsumeb and other regions by the high-quality trunk road; this also facilitates the transport of freight. However, a significant improvement in the rest of the road network and other forms of telecommunications is required. Oshakati and Ondangwa have airstrips that handle medium-sized airplanes in daylight only, and provisions can be made for both passengers and air freight. The establishment of a control tower may contribute to the improvement of all-weather air and transport. Oshakati has a state hospital that supports a number of clinics. Although both primary and secondary schools are spread across the region, there are few relative to the number of inhabitants of the region.

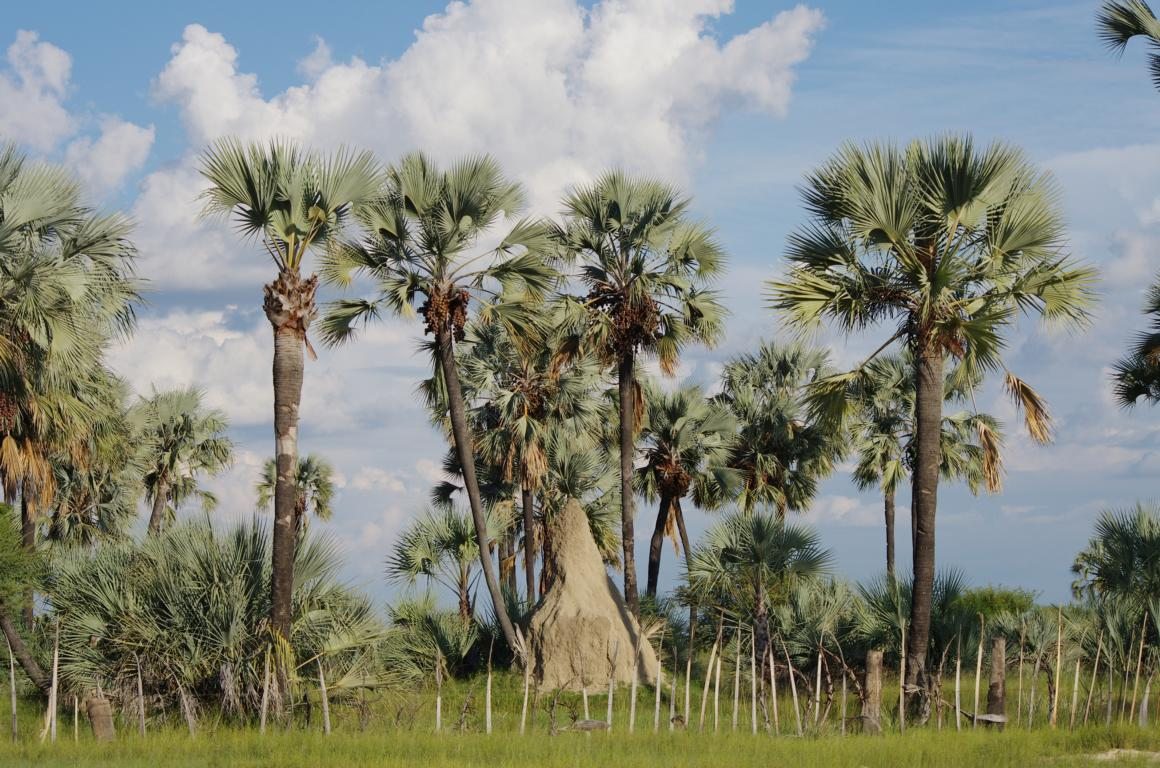
Typical landscape of the Oshana Region

Omahangu is the principal staple crop grown in Oshana, which is suitable for agriculture. However, the soil is exhausted over much of the central area and requires substantial fertilization to maintain reasonable productivity. Cattle also do well here, and herds are extensive. The southern portion of Oshana is an extensive savannah plain stretching as far as the Etosha Pan, but the generally high salinity of soil and water render it unsuitable for grazing or cultivation.

According to the 2012 Namibia Labour Force Survey, unemployment in the Oshana Region is 24.5%. Oshana has 137 schools with a total of 50,740 pupils.

== Politics ==
Oshana constituencies (2014)

The region comprises eleven constituencies:

- Okaku
- Okatana
- Okatyali
- Ompundja
- Ondangwa Rural
- Ondangwa Urban
- Ongwediva
- Oshakati East
- Oshakati West
- Uukwiyu
- Uuvudhiya

Electorally, the Oshana region is consistently dominated by the South West Africa People's Organization (SWAPO).

=== Regional elections ===
In the 2004 regional election for the National Assembly of Namibia, SWAPO won in all constituencies by a landslide.

The 2015 local and regional elections saw SWAPO obtain 92% of the total votes (2010: 91.0) and win uncontested in seven of the eleven Oshana constituencies. The remaining four constituencies SWAPO won by a landslide, with results well over 90%. Although SWAPO's support dropped to 65.4% of the total votes in the 2020 regional election, it again won in all constituencies. Only in Ondangwa Urban did the upstart Independent Patriots for Change (IPC), an opposition party formed in August 2020, come close to a council seat.

=== Governors ===
Clemens Kashuupulwa was appointed governor of Oshana in 1998. He was reappointed in 2015 following the 2014 election and served in this position until November 2018. In March 2019, Elia Irimari was appointed as governor. When his term ended in June 2025, Hofni Iipinge was appointed in July 2025.

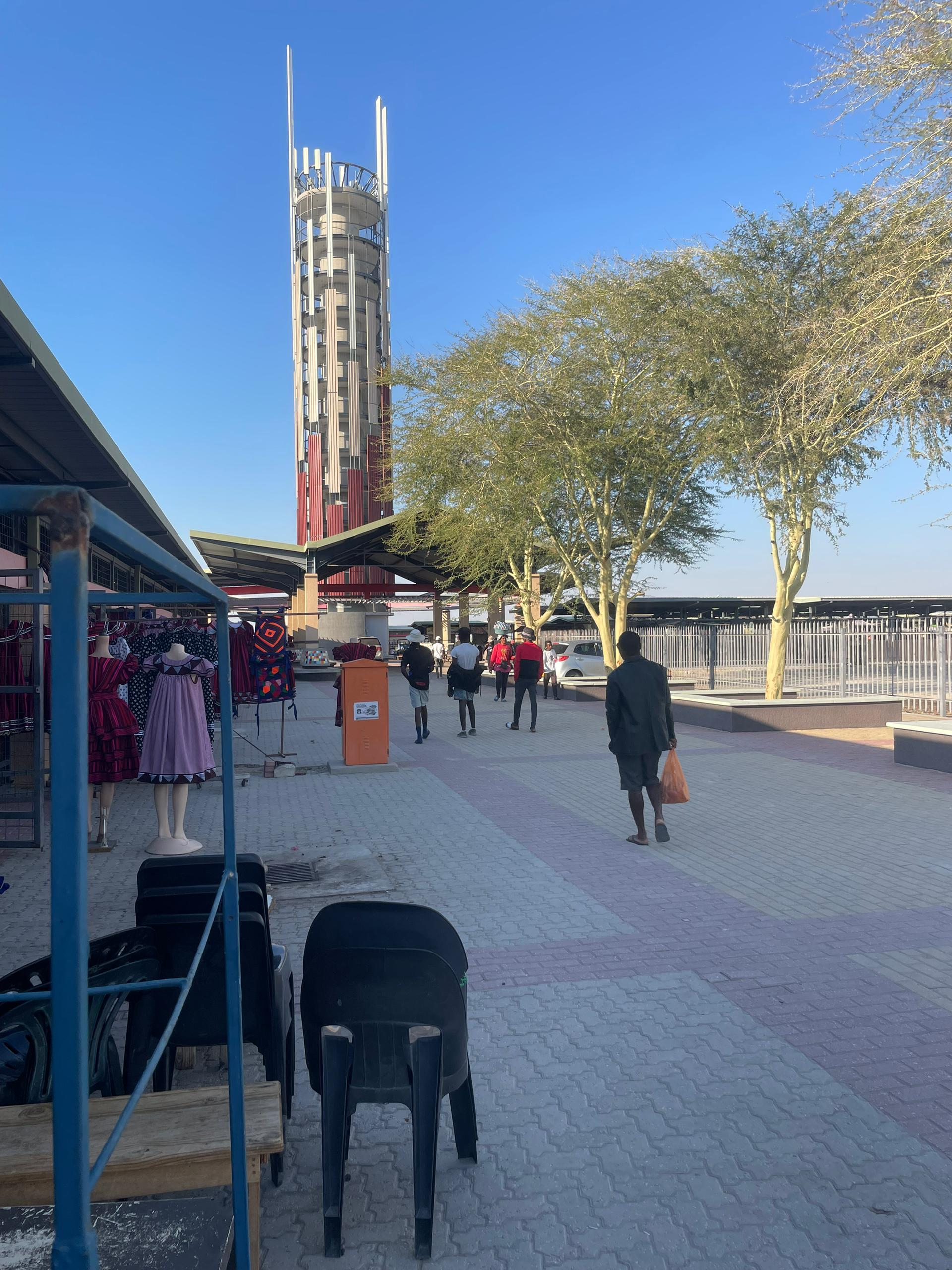
Side view of Observation Tower ‘OSHUNGO YA SHAKATI

== Demographics ==
As of 2023, Oshana has a population of 230,801. In the general population, women outnumber men, with only 86 males per 100 females. The population is roughly evenly split, with 53.2% living in urban settlements as opposed to 46.8% in rural settlements. The population density is 26.7 people per km². 4.3% of residents are not Namibian citizens. There are 60,412 private households, averaging 3.7 members.

The population is growing at an annual rate of 2.2%, with a fertility rate of 3.1 children per woman. 12.7% is under 5, 22.1% 5-14, 35.5% 15-34, 22.3% 35-59, and 7.3% over 60.

=== Marital status ===
24.2% of the adult population is married, either with a certificate (17.6%), traditionally (1%), in a consensual union (1.3%), divorced (0.7%), or widowed (3.2%). The population generally marries older, with only 0.2% of the current youth population married before age 18.

=== Education and employment ===
The literacy rate has decreased from 2011 to 92%. 30.8% percent of pre-primary youth attend Early Childhood Development (ECD) programs. The maximum level of educational attainment is mostly primary (40.8%), with only 27.5% pursuing secondary education and 15.1% pursuing tertiary education. 5.7% have no educational attainment. 39.3% of inhabitants earn a wage or salary as their primary source of income, 17% receive an old-age pension, 14% rely on farming, and 8.2% are involved in non-farming business.

=== Technology access ===
From 2011 to 2023, technology access largely improved. As of 2023, 98% of the population has access to safe drinking water, compared to 84.1% in 2011. 76.5% have access to toilet facilities, a 22.4% increase. The proportion of the population that has access to electricity for lighting has risen from 31% to 51.3% since 2011. Access to the internet has risen to 32.6%, while cellphone ownership is relatively stable at 59.4% (from 57.2% in 2011).
