= Ncamagoro Constituency =

Electoral constituency in the Kavango West region of northern Namibia

Ncamagoro constituency (light green, right) in the Kavango West region of Namibia

Ncamagoro Constituency is an electoral constituency in the Kavango West Region of Namibia. As of 2020 the constituency had 6,494 registered voters.

Ncamagoro was created in August 2013, following a recommendation of the Fourth Delimitation Commission of Namibia, and in preparation of the 2014 general election. The administrative centre of Ncamagoro Constituency is the village of Ncamagoro, also known as Mile 30. Ncamagoro was formed from the southern part of the Kapako Constituency.

== Politics ==
As in all Kavango West constituencies, SWAPO won the 2015 regional election by a landslide. Johannes Sikondo received 1,504 votes, followed by Faustinus Kauma Mangundu of the All People's Party (APP, 77 votes). Sikondo was re-elected in the 2020 regional election, winning with 902 votes, 89% of the total. Londrike Erastus of the Independent Patriots for Change (IPC) came distant second with 110 votes.

== See also ==
- Administrative divisions of Namibia
