= Haingura =

Haingura is a surname. Notable people with the surname include:

- Ambrosius Haingura (1957–2000), Namibian activist and politician
- Petrina Haingura (born 1959), Namibian politician
