= Okatyali Constituency =

Electoral constituency in the Oshana region of northern Namibia

Coordinates: 18°3′S 15°57′E

Okatyali Constituency (red) in the Oshana Region

Okatyali Constituency (also: Okatjali) is an electoral constituency in the Oshana Region of Namibia. It had 2,051 registered voters in 2020. Its district capital is the settlement of Okatyali. Okatyali Constituency covers an area of 558 km^{2} (215 sq mi). It had a population of 3,187 in 2011, up from 2,812 in 2001.

== Politics and governance ==
Okatyali constituency is traditionally a stronghold of the South West Africa People's Organization (SWAPO) party. The first regional councillor for this constituency was Paulus Kapia. He served until 1998. In the 2004 regional election SWAPO candidate Joseph Mupetami received 1,105 of the 1,109 votes cast.

In the 2015 local and regional elections the SWAPO candidate won uncontested and became councillor after no opposition party nominated a candidate. The SWAPO candidate won the 2020 regional election by a landslide. Josef Mupetami obtained 992 votes, followed by Aveli Nambili of the Independent Patriots for Change (IPC), an opposition party formed in August 2020, with 80 votes, and Silvanus Nakale of the Popular Democratic Movement with 33 votes.
