= Rupara =

- Settlement
- Location in Namibia
- Coordinates: 17°50′43″S 19°4′19″E
- Country: Namibia
- Region: Kavango West
- Established: 1929
- Time zone: UTC+2 (South African Standard Time)
- Climate: BSh

Rupara (in older print media and maps also known as Lupala, as it is pronounced by the Ovambo people) is a settlement and a former mission station of the Finnish Missionary Society in the Kahenge Constituency in the Kavango West Region in Northern Namibia. It is located 76 km west of Rundu, and 57 km south-east of Nkurenkuru.

== History of the mission station ==
The Finnish Missionary Society established its first mission station in Kavango in Nkurenkuru in the beginning of 1929. Its first permanent missionary there, pastor Aatu Järvinen (later Järvineva) founded a small station in Rupara in 1931, and built there a residence for the local missionary, consisting of two rooms, along with four round huts for the new clinic. The first missionary there was Anna Rautaheimo, a nurse.

In 1935, the clinic had more than 100 inpatients, and it was reported that the outpatients numbered “several thousand”.

The same year also teacher Maija Länsiö arrived there. She was given the task of developing an education system for the eastern parts of the tribe of Uukwangali.

== Rupara today ==
There is a community school known as Rupara Combined School, it goes up to grade 10, and it has a dormitory which accommodates learners from other villages. In addition there is also a clinic.
