= Mariental Urban =

Electoral constituency in Namibia

Coordinates: 24.6251°S 17.9614°E

Mariental Urban constituency (red) in the Hardap Region

Mariental Urban is a constituency in the Hardap region of Namibia. It comprises the town of Mariental and the surrounding area, covering an area of 4,916 km^{2} (1,898 sq mi) . It had a population of 6,092 in 2023. As of 2020 the constituency had 10,480 registered voters.

Historical population
Year	Pop.	±% p.a.
2001	13,109	—
2011	15,557	+1.73%
2023	18,368	+1.39%

== Politics ==
Mariental is traditionally a stronghold of the South West Africa People's Organization (SWAPO) party. In the 2004 regional election, SWAPO candidate Barakias Namwandi received 2,729 of the 4,037 votes cast and became councillor.

The 2015 regional elections were won by Nico Herman Mungenga of SWAPO with 2,251 votes. Regina Kuhlman of the Democratic Turnhalle Alliance (DTA) came second with 247 votes, followed by Reginald Poulton of the Rally for Democracy and Progress (RDP, 151 votes). The 2020 regional election was won by Petrus Esterhuizen of the Landless People's Movement (LPM, a new party registered in 2018). He obtained 2,015 votes. Fransina Fredrika Basson (SWAPO) came second with 1,409 votes.
