= Kaisosi =

- Settlement
- Location within Namibia
- Coordinates: 17.90367°S 19.81371°E
- Country: Namibia
- Region: Kavango East
- Time zone: UTC+2 (SAST)

Kaisosi is a settlement in the Kavango East region of north-eastern Namibia, situated about 5 kilometres (3.1 mi) outside Rundu. It is located between the Trans-Caprivi highway and the Maria Mwengere gravel road. Kaisosi is divided into two parts, Kaisosi the first which is about 1 km from Rundu university campus and Kaisosi the second which is about 1.5 km from Rundu campus. There are two schools in Kaisosi, Sarusungu Combined School and Kaisosi Primary School. Kaisosi clinic and police station are located next to each other in the Kaisosi the second along the gravel road few meters from Sarusungu Combined School.

Kaisosi features an irrigation farm along the Maria Mwengere road. Many inhabitants grow their own food there. There is also a low-cost housing project.
