= Katutura East =

Electoral constituency in the Khomas region of central Namibia

Coordinates: 22.523°S 17.060°E

Katutura East constituency (red) in the Khomas Region

Katutura East is a constituency in the Khomas Region of Namibia. It consists of the extensions 1, 6, and 19 of the suburb Katutura, a township within Windhoek that was founded by the then Apartheid government of Namibia for black people in the 1950s. It had a population of 18,501 in 2011, up from 17,745 in 2001. As of 2020, it has 15,878 registered voters.

== Politics ==
Katutura Central is traditionally a stronghold of the South West Africa People's Organization (SWAPO) party. The first councillor of Katutura East was Gabriel Ithete (SWAPO). He served until 2004. In the 2004 regional election, he was replaced by Elina Ndapuka (also SWAPO) who received 2,453 of the 3,936 votes cast.

The 2015 regional elections were again won by SWAPO; Ruben Sheehama won the constituency with 2,912 votes. Ina Gouws of the Democratic Turnhalle Alliance (DTA) came distant second with 386 votes, followed by Telwin Dennis Owoseb of the Rally for Democracy and Progress (RDP, 295 votes). The SWAPO candidate also won the 2020 regional election, albeit by a much smaller margin. Richard Gaoseb received 1,772 votes, followed by Michael Mulunga of the Independent Patriots for Change (IPC, an opposition party formed in August 2020) with 992 votes, Olsen Kahiri of the Landless People's Movement (LPM, also a new party, registered in 2018) with 594 votes, and independent candidates Mervin Claasen and Claudia Namises with 540 and 461 votes, respectively.
