= Mashare Constituency =

Electoral constituency in the Kavango East region of north-eastern Namibia

Coordinates: 17°54′S 20°08′E

Mashare constituency (red) in the Kavango East region of Namibia

Mashare is a constituency in the Kavango East region of northern Namibia. The district centre is the settlement of Mashare. It had a population of 15,688 in 2011, down from 16,007 in 2001. As of 2020 the constituency had 9,165 registered voters.

The constituency contains the settlements of Dwasa, Tceha, Kondja, Namagadi, and Rudjadja.

There is a bilateral agreement with Angola to allow mutual near-border immigration without travel documents. This applies to a maximum distance of 30 km, and it is not valid for tourists.

== Politics ==
Mashare constituency is traditionally a stronghold of the South West Africa People's Organization (SWAPO) party. In the 2004 regional election SWAPO candidate Bonifatius Wakudumo received 3,972 of the 4,928 votes cast.

The 2015 regional elections were won by SWAPO candidate Mavara Fillipus Nkore with 2,707 votes. Paulus Sikongo of the All People's Party (APP) came second with 1,487 votes, and Nankema Shirongo of the Democratic Turnhalle Alliance (DTA) came third with 110 votes. Nkore was re-elected in the 2020 regional election after obtaining 1,716 votes. Engelbert Hamutenya Namufinda (APP) came second with 692 votes.

== See also ==
- Constituencies of Namibia
