= Maurus Nekaro =

Maurus Nekaro (August 25, 1955 – March 4, 2013) was a Namibian politician and member of the SWAPO political party. Nekaro served as former governor Smith the governor of Kavango Region, one of Namibia's thirteen regions, from December 2010 until his death on March 4, 2013.

Nekaro graduated from Rundu Secondary School in Rundu, South-West Africa (present-day Namibia), in 1977. He received both his Bachelor of Commerce and Masters of Philosophy degrees from the University of Western Cape in South Africa. He also attended the University of Fort Hare.

Nekaro served as the mayor of Rundu, the capital of Kavango Region, from 1997 until 2003. He then served as the deputy director of finance for the Ohangwena Regional Council prior from 2004 to 2010.

In December 2010, Nekaro was appointed as the Governor of the northern Kavango Region by Namibian President Hifikepunye Pohamba.

Governor Maurus Nekaro became ill after attending the Mandume Day ceremony held at the Omhedi Palace in the Ohangwena Region, Namibia, on March 2, 2013. He was discovered unresponsive at the Monte Carlos Bed & Breakfast in Eenhana, where he was staying. He was driven to an Eenhana District Hospital by his driver, where he was pronounced dead early on March 4, 2013, at the age of 58. An autopsy conducted at Oshakati State Hospital preliminarily determined that he died from chronic high blood pressure. He was survived by his wife and seven children.
