= Nkurenkuru =

- Town
- Location in Namibia
- Coordinates: 17°37′S 18°36′E
- Country: Namibia
- Region: Kavango West
- Constituency: Mpungu Constituency
- Established: 1820

Government
  - Mayor: Erastus Kandjimi (SWAPO)

Area
  - Total: 49.3 km^{2} (19.0 sq mi)
- Elevation: 1,093 m (3,586 ft)

Population (2023 census)
  - Total: 10,463
  - Density: 212/km^{2} (550/sq mi)
- Time zone: UTC+2 (SAST)
- Area code: +66
- Climate: BSh

Nkurenkuru (1.093 m above sea level) is a town on the south-western banks of the Kavango River. It is the capital of the Kavango West region of northern Namibia, located 140 kilometres (87 mi) west of Rundu. It is also a former mission station of the Finnish Missionary Society.

Nkurenkuru had 10,463 inhabitants in 2023. It is homestead of the local Uukwangali kings. Until 1936 it has been the capital of the region, after which the seat of the regional government was moved to Rundu, due to its strategically more central location. In 2013 it became a regional capital again, of the newly created Region of Kavango West. Nkurenkuru was the smallest town in Namibia at that time. It is the only self-governed settlement in Kavango West. On the opposite, north-eastern banks of the river lies Cuangar in Angola, and the two towns are linked via the Katwitwi border post.

== History ==
The history of Nkurenkuru (formerly also Kuring Kuru), Kwangali language: „the old place”, is closely linked with the history of the Kwangali people, the westernmost of the five kingdoms of the Kavango people.

The currently oldest deliverances date around the middle of the 18th century, when Uukwangali queen (hompa) Mate I. and her people left their former area of settlement on the Kwando River near Mashi and moved about 500 km to the west into an area near Makuzu 17°29′0″S 18°28′0″E, around 20 km to the northwest of Nkurenkuru. Successor of Queen Mate I. became hompa Nankali (1750–1775). During her reign tensions arose with neighboring people and the Kwangali moved from Mazuku first to Sihangu near Mukukuta and then further to Karai (nearby today's Cuangar). Likely during the reign of hompa Siremo, Nkurenkuru was founded in 1820 and became homestead of the kings under King Mpande in 1880.

On December 30, 1886, Portugal and Germany signed a bilateral agreement, in which the borders between Angola and South West Africa were defined along the Okavango River. The tribes of the Kavango people, who at this time settled on both sides of the river, were informed about this new territorial setting only afterwards. On the north side of the river, the Portuguese started with the construction of a number of forts; among others Fort Cuangar, directly opposite of the residence of the Kwangali kings. On the south side, a number of military and missionary expeditions were carried out along the river. On August 17, 1909, Berengar von Zastrow, for the German administration, and King Himarua (1886–1910), for the Uukwangali hompas, signed a protection agreement (Schutzvertrag) with general authority for the government in Windhuk and land ownership of the kings. In response to those forts on the northern side of the river, the German administration opened a police station in Nkurenkuru on June 17, 1910, which over the following years mainly assumed representative tasks. With the outbreak of World War I and a murdered German delegation at Naulila, the police station was used to launch an attack on Fort Cuangar on October 31, 1914, in which all present 30 Portuguese and Angolan soldiers were killed. With the end of the war the station was closed and first replaced by a temporary British occupation and from April 1921 onwards by a permanent governor for the newly established Kavango district. The new local government resulted in an extended political presence of the new League of Nations mandate government of South West Africa, but already in 1936 the administration was moved to Rundu, which was also chosen as the new district capital. Consequently, during the following 50 years Nkurenkuru fell into increasing insignificance.

Compared to many other towns in Namibia, Nkurenkuru was underdeveloped at independence. The town suffered from bad infrastructure and the political unrest in neighboring Angola. The economy of Nkurenkuru was characterized by small farmers with only few general services: a post office, two schools, a small hospital and a petrol station. Nkurenkuru had only a few other shops.

=== Finnish mission station ===
The Finnish Missionary Society began its work in Kavango at Nkurenkuru from the beginning of 1929. Nkurenkuru had been chosen as the first Finnish mission station by the local mission chief of Ovamboland, Isak Alho, along with Eetu Järvinen, who had visited the place the previous year. The mission station was established near the local government station.

The first missionary in Nkurenkuru was Eetu Järvinen, who arrived there on New Year's Day, 1929, in order to build the main building of the mission station. The first permanent missionary, Aatu Järvinen (later Järvineva), arrived on the scene on 8 June 1929, together with his wife Alma. In 1931 they were joined by Anna Rautaheimo, who was a nurse, and Kyllikki Alava.

In 1990 the Evangelical Lutheran Church in Namibia (ELCIN) founded a secondary school in Nkurenkuru with the aid of the Finnish Missionary Society. For a number of years the school has had some Finnish teachers teaching e.g. the natural sciences. During the Angolan Civil War (1975–2002) Nkurenkuru became home for a base of the South African Defence Force.

=== Since independence ===
Since independence of Namibia in 1990 and in particularly since an ongoing decentralisation policy, Nkurenkuru has gained some investments. In 2006 Nkurenkuru was declared a town and was the second urban centre of the Kavango Region. When in August 2013 the Kavango Region was split into two, Nkurenkuru became the capital of the newly created Kavango West Region. Since then it has been the only self-governed settlement of that region.

Historical population
Year	Pop.	±% p.a.
2011	618	—
2023	10,436	+26.56%

== Economy and infrastructure ==
Since independence in 1990, Nkurenkuru gained little from national infrastructure improvements. Only with an ongoing decentralisation policy of the government, which is to counterbalance rural migration, Nkurenkuru gained more economic prosperity. With the proclamation as a town, Nkurenkuru received means for the establishment of a municipal administration and additional means for infrastructure and public services, which also led to more workplaces. Among the largest projects currently under way are the asphaltation of the river road to Rundu as well as an irrigation project for a more efficient agricultural use of the surrounding farmland. Since then, additional private investments have also followed — like the opening of additional shops and banks as well as lodges and guest houses along the river.

Nkurenkuru has a health centre. In 2020 a small COVID-19 isolation facility was added.

Nepara Airfield (ICAO Code: FYNP), a former base of the South African Air Force, lies around 20 km southwest of Nkurenkuru and is used as a commercial airport for Nkurenkuru. About 35 km to the northwest lies the Katwitwi border post, from which a road leads further to Menongue in Angola.

== Politics ==
Nkurenkuru is governed by a town council that currently has seven seats.

SWAPO won the 2015 local authority election in Nkurenkuru by a landslide, gaining all seven municipal council seats with 1,303 votes. The Democratic Turnhalle Alliance (DTA) and the Republican Party (RP) also ran and gained 35 and 32 votes, respectively. The 2020 local authority election saw the same result. SWAPO gained 1,050 votes and won all seven seats.

== Tertiary Institutions ==
- Welwitchia Health Training Center- Nkurenkuru campus (Zangata complex and Olunho Campus)
- International University of Management (IUM)

== Schools ==
- ELCIN Nkurenkuru High School
- Nkurenkuru Combined School
- Nkurenkuru Junior School
- Nkurenkuru Junior Primary School
- Kanuni Haruwodi Combined School
- Kamina Junior Primary School
- Kahenge Combined School

== Famous people ==
- Hompa Daniel Sitentu Mpasi, King of Vakwangali
- Sirkka Ausiku, State Secretary, Ministry of Gender Equality and Child Welfare
- Rosalia Nghidinwa, Minister of Immigration and Home Affairs
- Heikki Hausiku Ausiku, first mayor of Nkurenkuru (2006–2010)
- Matias Shikondomboro, Lutheran evangelist
- Elijah Ngurare, Prime Minister of Namibia (2025)
