= ReconAfrica =

Canadian oil & gas exploration company

Reconnaissance Energy Africa Ltd.
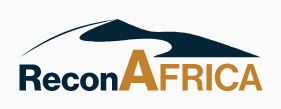
- Trade name: ReconAfrica
- Type: Public
- Traded as: TSX-V: RECO; OTCQX: RECAF; FWB: 0XD
- ISIN: CA75624R1082
- Industry: Oil and gas exploration
- Founded: 2014
- Founder: Craig Steinke
- Headquarters: Calgary, Alberta
- Key people: Brian Reinsborough (CEO)
- Website: reconafrica.com

Reconnaissance Energy Africa Ltd., operating as ReconAfrica, is a Canadian oil and gas company engaged in the exploration of the Damara Fold Belt and Kavango Rift Basin in northeastern Namibia, southeastern Angola and northwestern Botswana. The company also operates the Ngulu block in the shallow waters offshore central Gabon. Headquartered in Calgary, it was founded by Craig Steinke in Vancouver. Brian Reinsborough is the president and CEO. ReconAfrica is publicly traded on the TSX Venture Exchange, the OTCQX, and the Frankfurt Stock Exchange.

== Operations and history ==
ReconAfrica originally acquired a high-resolution aeromagnetic survey of the exploration license area in Namibia and conducted an analysis of the resulting data and other available data, including reprocessing and reinterpretation of all existing geological and geophysical data. The survey and analysis confirmed that the Kavango sedimentary basin reaches depths of up to 9,000 metres (30,000 feet).

ReconAfrica drilled two exploration wells in 2021, with the results confirming a working conventional petroleum system.

In July 2024, ReconAfrica entered into a farm down agreement with BW Energy Limited, a company majority owned by BW Group, for 20% working interest in Petroleum Exploration Licence 73, in northeast Namibia.

In December 2025, ReconAfrica announced a hydrocarbon discovery on its fifth well drilled in Namibia. The production test on the discovery well (named Kavango West 1X) in the summer of 2026 demonstrated that natural gas and potential liquid hydrocarbons successfully flowed to the surface from the upper zones of the Hüttenberg Formation. Operations have advanced toward open-hole horizontal sidetrack testing to establish sustained commercial flow rates and further analyze liquid yields.

== Community outreach ==
In 2022, ReconAfrica provided N$1.2 million (68,000 USD) worth of scholarships to ten Namibian students from the Kavango East and Kavango West regions.

As of October 2023, ReconAfrica had drilled and installed 36 solar-powered water wells in the Kavango East and Kavango West regions, bringing potable water to the inhabitants. The water wells have enabled access to clean water, thereby eliminating the challenges and serious risks associated with the manual collection of water from the rivers in the region.

== Criticism ==
The region, in northwestern Botswana and northeastern Namibia, is adjacent to two national parks and two UNESCO World Heritage Sites and UNESCO has expressed concern about the proximity of ReconAfrica's exploration activities. The impact of the exploration work on water quality in the region, and also it's potential contribution to climate change, was also stated as a concern.

A May 2021 National Geographic article alleged that the company was estimating future revenues based on fracking.

In 2021, U.S. Senator Patrick Leahy (D-VT) and Congressman Jeff Fortenberry (R-NE) called for a scrutiny of ReconAfrica's activities in Namibia by the U.S. Securities and Exchanges Commission. Prince Harry and Reinhold Mangundu also co-wrote an opinion article in the Washington Post that condemned ReconAfrica's exploratory activities.

In February 2022, ReconAfrica was accused of cutting through a virgin forest within environmental conservancy boundaries.

A class-action lawsuit was filed against ReconAfrica in 2021 alleging the company misled investors about its oil and gas drilling prospects in the Kavango Basin. The lawsuit was settled in 2024 with the company paying $10.8 million USD to eligible shareholders. The settlement was reached via mediation without any admission of liability by the company.
