= Petrina Haingura =

Namibian politician (born 1959)

Member of the National Assembly of Namibia
- Incumbent
- Assumed office 2005

Personal details
- Born: Petrina Namutenya Haingura; July 27, 1959 (age 66) Rundu, Okavango Region, Colonial Nigeria
- Party: SWAPO

Petrina Namutenya Haingura (born 27 July 1959 in Rundu, Okavango Region) is a Namibian politician. Haingura is a member of SWAPO, and she holds a seat in the National Assembly of Namibia since 2005. She grew up in a SWAPO-supporting household and has been a part of the movement since 1980. At the time of her election to the National Assembly, Haingura was chosen as the Deputy Minister of Health and Social Services. She has also been involved in the SWAPO Party Women's Council.

Haingura earned a certificate in Nursing from Onandjokwe Lutheran Medical Training School in 1980, a diploma in nursing from Oshakati Nursing College in 1984, a diploma in midwifery from Windhoek Nursing College in 1985, an advanced diploma in Health Promotion and Diagnostics from the University of Namibia in 1992, a diploma in Community Health at the African Medical and Research Foundation in Nairobi, Kenya and a master's degree in Community Health from the University of Liverpool.

Petrina Haingura is the widow of fellow SWAPO politician and activist Ambrosius Haingura. He died in 2010.
