= Sirkka Ausiku =

Namibian administrator and politician

Sirkka Namutenya Anneli Mwahafa Ausiku
- Born: 16 April 1964 (age 62)
- Education: University of the Western Cape (BA); University of Namibia (MA)
- Occupation: Politician

Sirrka Namutenya Anneli Mwahafa Ausiku (born 1964) is a Namibian administrator and politician, currently serving as a legislator in the 8th National Assembly. She was the governor of Kavango West from 2014 to 2025.

Ausiku was born on 9 April 1964 in Nkurenkuru in the Kavango (today Kavango West) Region. She holds a diploma in Higher Education as well as a BA degree from the University of the Western Cape, and a Master's degree in Public Policy and Administration from the University of Namibia. She has worked as teacher at Kandjimi Murangi Secondary School, as an education administrator, and as a permanent secretary in the Namibian government.

Ausiku holds the Most Excellent Order of the Eagle, Second Class.

== Governor ==
President Pohamba announced Ausiku's nomination as governor of the newly created Kavango West region at a SWAPO Party Central Committee meeting. Prior to her appointment, she was the Permanent Secretary in the Namibian Ministry of Gender Equality and later the Ministry of Regional and Local Government, Housing and Rural Development. She kept her position in 2015 in president Hage Geingob's first and second government. In 2025, Netumbo Nandi-Ndaitwah replaced her with Verna Sinimbo.

During her tenure, Kavango's council completed constituency offices at Mpungu and Ncamagoro and established a regional government office complex in Nkurenkuru.
