= Gerhard Tötemeyer =

Namibian academic and politician (1935–2024)

Deputy minister of Regional and Local Government, Housing and Rural Development
- In office 2000–2004

Personal details
- Born: 21 May 1935 Gibeon, South West Africa (now Namibia)
- Died: c. 31 January 2024 (aged 88) Swakopmund, Namibia
- Party: SWAPO
- Education: University of Stellenbosch

Gerhard Karl Hans Tötemeyer (21 May 1935 – c. 31 January 2024) was a Namibian academic and politician who served as deputy minister of local government from 2000 to 2004.

== Life and career ==
Gerhard Karl Hans Tötemeyer was born in Gibeon, and spent the first four years of his life in Keetmanshoop, where his father worked as a missionary. When World War II broke out in September 1939, his family was on vacation in Germany, where they remained until 1950. At that time Tötemeyer spoke neither English nor Afrikaans, the official languages of South West Africa. He did not continue school owing to his language difficulties; the principal would have "placed him in so low a grade that [he] would have been frustrated".

Tötemeyer took up vocational training as a merchant at his uncle's general dealership and caught up with school after hours. When he finished his training in 1953, he entered Paul Roos Gymnasium in Stellenbosch, and matriculated in 1955. He then studied history at the University of Stellenbosch on a stipend awarded by the Administration of South West Africa. He graduated with a B Hons in 1959 and acquired the Secondary School teacher's diploma in 1960.

Tötemeyer returned to South West Africa and taught at Windhoek High School in 1961 and 1962. Afterwards he took up a research post at Freiburg, Germany, and obtained a D Phil from the University of Stellenbosch in 1974. Before entering politics he held several academic and administrative positions at the universities of Stellenbosch, the Transkei, and Cape Town. In 1987, shortly before Namibian Independence, he moved to Windhoek and became Dean of the Faculty of Economics and Management Science at the University of Namibia.

After independence in 1990, Tötemeyer was a member of the first Delimitation Commission of Namibia, a body that infrequently decides on the administrative division of the country. He was director of elections between 1992 and 1998, became a member of Parliament in 2000 and was appointed deputy minister of Regional and Local Government, Housing and Rural Development. He retired in 2004 due to health concerns. Tötemeyer frequently published on politics and education in South Africa and Namibia. From 2005 Tötemeyer was chairman of National Housing Enterprise, a state-owned company providing housing for the poor.

On 31 January 2024, Tötemeyer's body was discovered at his home. It is suspected that he died from a heart attack. He was 88.
