= Zedekia Ngavirue =

Namibian academic (1933–2021)

- Born: Zedekia Josef Ngavirue; 4 March 1933; Okakarara, South West Africa
- Died: 24 June 2021 (aged 88); Windhoek, Namibia
- Education: Uppsala University; Oxford University
- Occupations: Diplomat, academic
- Political party: SWANU

Zedekia Josef Ngavirue (Zed Ngavirue) (4 March 1933 – 24 June 2021) was a Namibian academic and long-serving Namibian ambassador to the European Union as well as to Belgium, the Netherlands and Luxembourg.

== Education and career ==
Ngavirue was educated at Augustineum Secondary School, Waterberg and Stofberg. He received a B.Phil. degree from the Uppsala University in Sweden and a Doctor of Philosophy from Oxford University in the United Kingdom. He was a member of SWANU. Ngavirue founded The South West News a newspaper in English, Afrikaans, Otjiherero and Oshiwambo, and edited with Emil Appolus who later played a prominent role in the South West African National Union (SWANU).

Ngavirue left Namibia in 1960, serving as a lecturer at the University of Papua New Guinea between 1972 and 1978 before returning to his native country in 1981. He worked in various managerial positions at the Rössing uranium mine from 1983 to 1989.

Following Namibia's independence, Ngavirue became director-general of the National Planning Commission from 1990 to 1995. He was the Namibian Ambassador to the EU and Belgium in Brussels between 1995 and 2003.

Although he retired in 2003, Ngavirue occasionally received government appointments. Most prominent among them was his role as special envoy on matters relating to the 1904 – 1908 Herero and Namaqua genocide. He deliberated with his German counterpart, Ruprecht Polenz and was spearheading discussions with the German government on the 1904-1908 genocide, appointed by President Hage Geingob. Ngavirue also served in the 4th Delimitation Commission, advising on Namibia's administrative division.

Ngavirue died from Covid-19 in 2021.
