= Ambrosius Haingura =

Namibian activist and politician

Ambrosius Hamutenya Haingura (30 June 1957 – 21 September 2000) was a Namibian activist and politician. A member of the South West Africa People's Organization (SWAPO), he was an internal activist during the Namibian War of Independence. Following independence, he served as Regional Councillor for Rundu Urban constituency from 1992 until his death. From 1993 to 1995, he served as the first Regional Governor of the Kavango Region, and from 1996 to his death he represented the Kavango Region in the National Council of Namibia.

Ambrosius Haingura was the husband of fellow SWAPO politician Petrina Haingura.
