= Kavango Region =

- Former Region
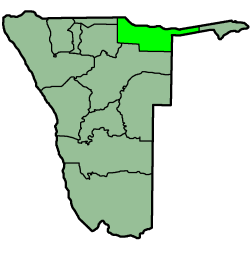
- Location of the Kavango Region in Namibia
- Coordinates: 17°55′S 19°45′E
- Country: Namibia
- Capital: Rundu

Area
  - Total: 48,742 km^{2} (18,819 sq mi)

Population (2011)
  - Total: 223,352
  - Density: 4.5823/km^{2} (11.868/sq mi)
- Time zone: UTC+2 (CAT)

Kavango (before 1998: Okavango) was one of the thirteen regions of Namibia until it was split into the Kavango East and Kavango West Regions in 2013. Its capital was Rundu.

In the north, Kavango bordered the Cuando Cubango Province of Angola, and in the southeast the North-West District of Botswana. Domestically, it bordered the following regions:

- Zambezi – east
- Otjozondjupa – south
- Oshikoto – west
- Ohangwena – northwest

Because of its rather higher rainfall than most other parts of Namibia, this region had agricultural potential for the cultivation of a variety of crops, as well as for organised forestry and agro-forestry, which stimulated furniture making and related industries.

Khaudum National Park and Mahango Game Park were located in the region.

== Constituencies ==
Kavango comprised nine constituencies:

- Kahenge
- Kapako
- Mashare
- Mpungu
- Mukwe.
- Ndiyona
- Rundu Rural East
- Rundu Rural West
- Rundu Urban

== Regional elections ==
Electorally, Kavango was consistently dominated by the South West Africa People's Organization (SWAPO). In the 2004 regional election for the National Assembly of Namibia, SWAPO won all constituencies by a large margin.

== Governors ==
Ambrosius Haingura, a prominent SWAPO organizer during the Namibian War of Independence, served as the region's first regional governor from 1993 to 1995. Maurus Nekaro, the governor of the Kavango Region from December 2010, died in office on March 4, 2013. Samuel Mbambo was appointed as Kavango's last governor in April 2013.

== Dissolution ==
The Fourth Delimitation Commission of Namibia, responsible for recommending on the country's administrative divisions suggested in August 2013 to split the Kavango Region into two. The president Hifikepunye Pohamba enacted the recommendations. As a result, the new regions of Kavango East and Kavango West were created.

== Population ==
The region was characterised by an extremely uneven population distribution. The interior is very sparsely inhabited, while the northernmost strip, especially along the Kavango River, has a high population concentration. Largest urban settlements were the capital Rundu and the towns of Nkurenkuru and Divundu.

== Economy and infrastructure ==
Kavango was the region with the highest poverty level in Namibia, more than 50% of the population were classified as poor. According to the 2012 Namibia Labour Force Survey, unemployment in the Kavango Region was 29.8% at the time. Economic activities included farming and tourism. Subsistence fishing also played a role in the nutrition of the people residing near the Kavango River.

Kavango had 323 schools with a total of 77,314 pupils.

=== Transport ===
There was a particular dearth of north-south roads in the Region, apart from the Rundu-Grootfontein main road. Rundu has a small airstrip to accommodate medium-sized tourist or cargo aircraft in daylight only. The poor condition of the roads and the long distances had a negative effect on tourism; this situation was improved by the completion of the Trans–Caprivi Highway. A major highway connecting Rundu to western Kavango and the Ohangwena Region is under construction.
