= Okavango River =

Major river in southern Africa

Okavango
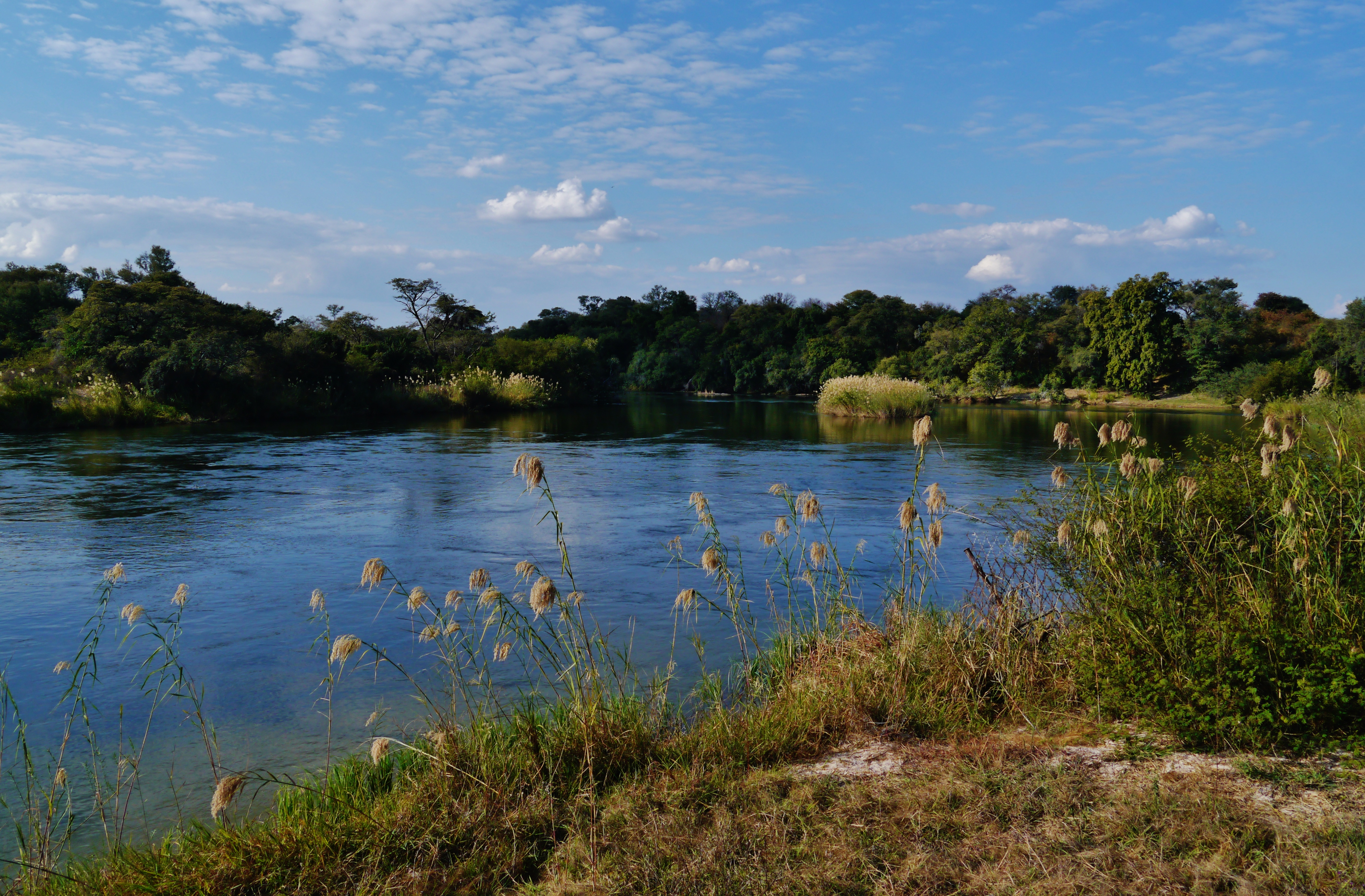
- Okavango in Kavango, Namibia

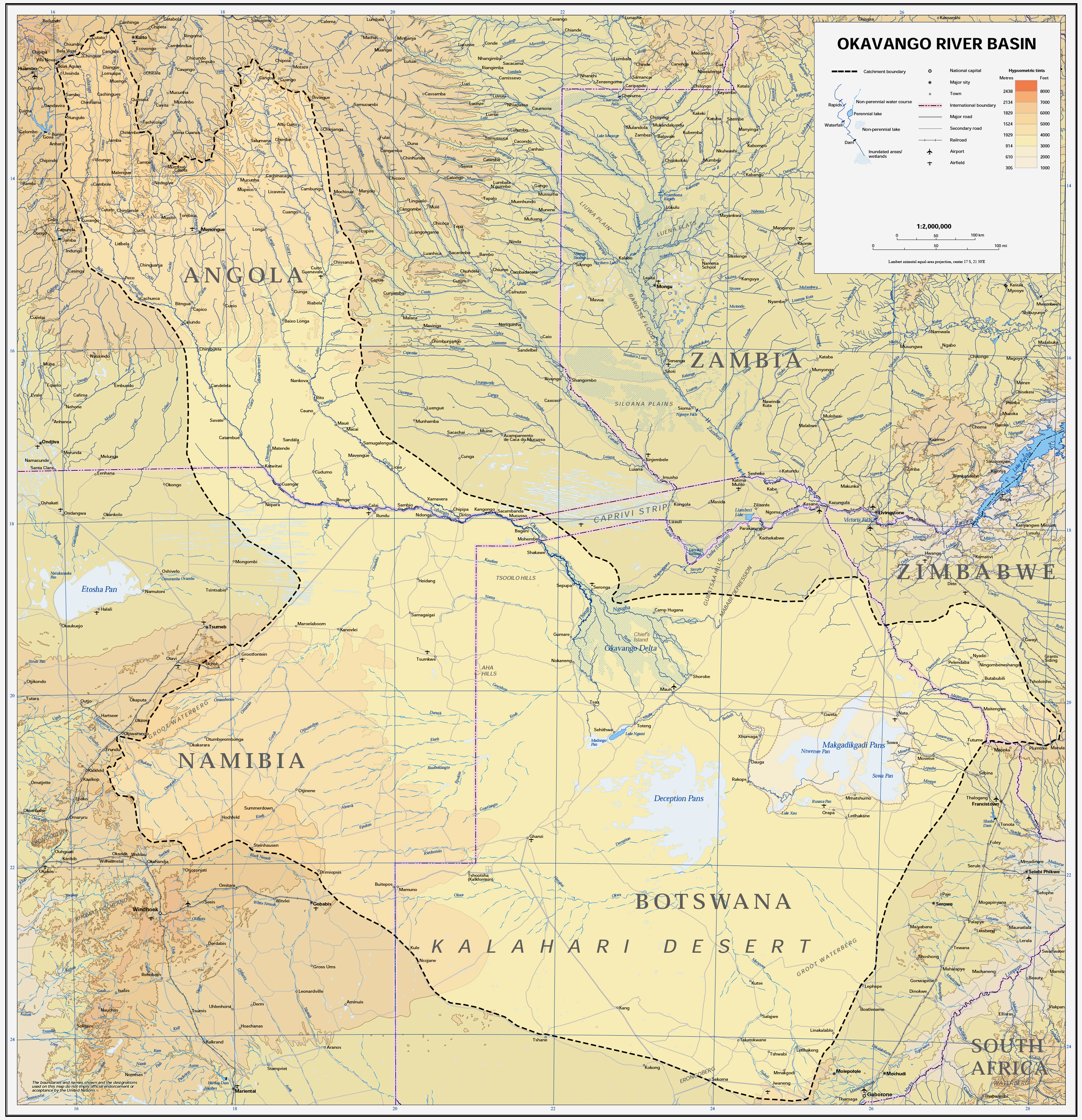
- Okavango river basin map

Location
- Countries: Angola; Namibia; Botswana

Physical characteristics
- Source
  - location: Cachiungo, Angola
  - coordinates: 12°42′22″S 16°04′52″E
  - elevation: 1,788 m (5,866 ft)
- Mouth: Okavango Delta
  - location: Moremi Game Reserve, Botswana
  - coordinates: 18°59′17″S 22°34′34″E
  - elevation: 978 m (3,209 ft)
- Length: 1,700 km (1,100 mi)
- Basin size: 530,000 km^{2} (200,000 sq mi)
- Discharge
  - average: 475 m^{3}/s (16,800 cu ft/s)
  - minimum: 350 m^{3}/s (12,000 cu ft/s)
  - maximum: 1,000 m^{3}/s (35,000 cu ft/s)

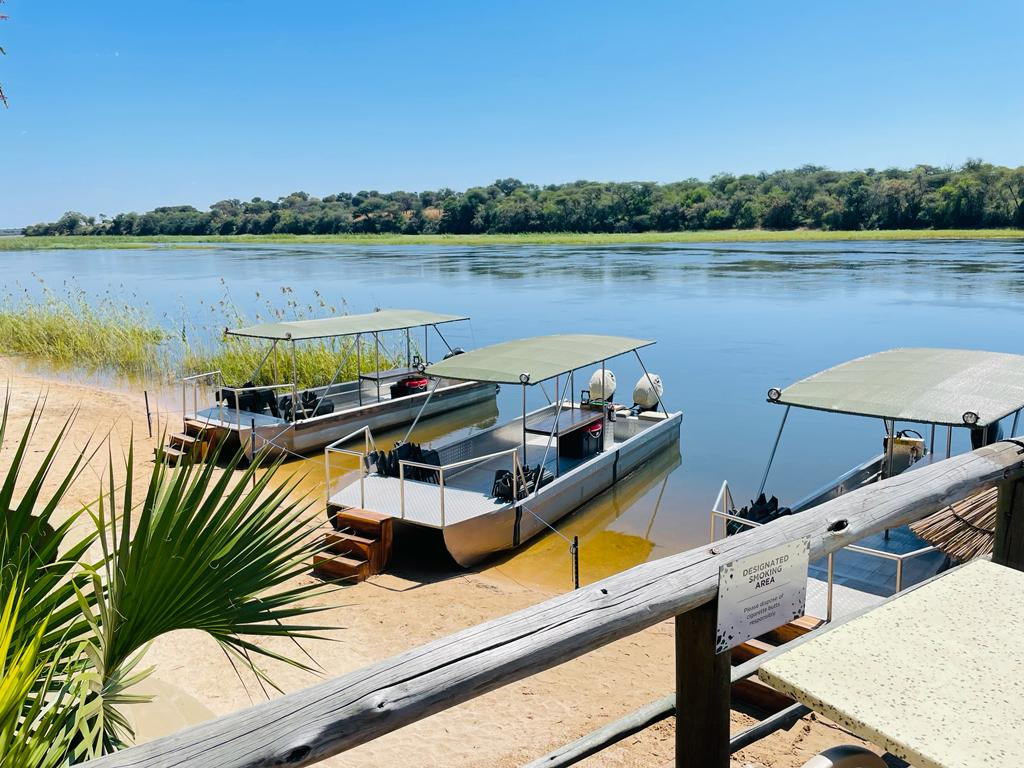
Kavango river view at Hakusembe river lodge

The Okavango River (formerly spelt Okovango or Okovanggo) is a river in southwestern Africa. It is known by this name in Botswana, as Cubango in Angola, and Kavango in Namibia. It is the fourth-longest river system in southern Africa, running southeastward for 1,600 km (1,000 mi). It begins at an elevation of 1,300 metres (4,300 ft) in the sandy highlands of Angola. Farther south, it forms part of the border between Angola and Namibia, and then flows into Botswana. The Okavango does not have an outlet to the sea. Instead, it discharges into the Okavango Delta or Okavango Alluvial Fan, in an endorheic basin in the Kalahari Desert. The Cuito River is a major tributary.

== Name ==
The name Okavango is derived from the Kavango, which refers to the Kavango people of northern Namibia.

Older English spellings included Okovango, while some Namibian scholarship prefers Kavango when referring to the Namibian river and region. Historian Andreas Eckl notes that German colonial reports used Okavango, but that the initial O- is not common in local Kavango languages, and has instead been attributed to Herero influence.

== Flow ==
The Cubango and Cuito Rivers are the principal tributaries of the Okavango Delta, and affect its health. In Angola, seasonal controlled burns of the vegetation clog the upper reaches of the Cuito and reduce water flow downstream as the accumulated water instead flows into the sand.

In 2015, National Geographic launched the Okavango Wilderness Project (NGOWP) to extensively survey the Okavango/Cubango Basin . In 2023, the NGOWP published their findings which included the discovery of the original source. The source was found to be dense peatland in the Angola Highlands, aptly called the "Angola Highlands Water Tower" (AHWT) or Lisima Iya Mwono - meaning "Source of Life" - in the Luchaze language. Over 12 feet deep in some areas, the AHWT is estimated to hold 423km^{3} (or over 100 trillion gallons) of water, supplying over 95% of the water in the Okavanga Basin . In 2026, the AHWT has been designated as Angola's first "Wetland of International Importance" by the Ramsar Convention on Wetlands and the Angolan government .

Before it enters Botswana, the river drops 4 m (13 ft) in a series of rapids known as Popa Falls, visible when the river is low, as during the dry season.

In the rainy season, an outflow to the Boteti River in turn seasonally discharges to the Makgadikgadi Pans, which features an expansive area of rainy-season wetland where tens of thousands of flamingos congregate each summer. Part of the river's flow fills Lake Ngami.

== Flood ==
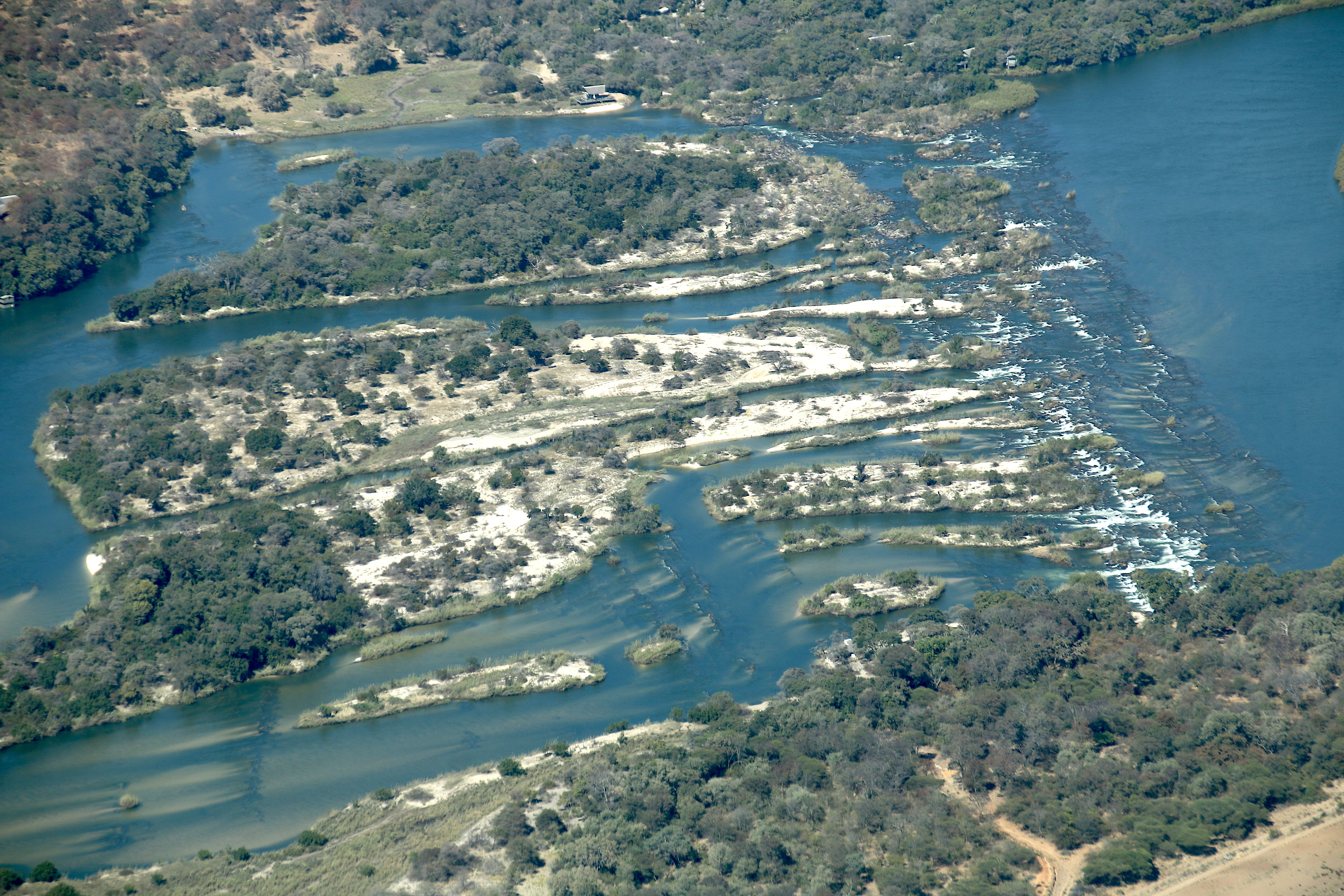
Popa Falls (2018)

Every wet season, Angola receives three times more rainfall than Botswana, discharging a higher than usual flow into the Okavango, turning swathes of outlying desert into a huge wetland.

Although the summer rains fall in Angola in January, they take a whole month to travel the first 1,000 km of the Okavango River, and then they take a further four months to filter through the plants and numerous channels of the final 250 km of the delta. As a result, the flood is at its biggest sometime between June and August, during Botswana's dry winter months. The delta then swells to three times its permanent size, attracting animals from kilometres around and creating one of Africa's greatest concentrations of wildlife.

At its widest point in a big flood year, the seasonal swamp stretches to 150 km across from east to west; one of the factors that leads to the ever-changing nature of the delta is the flatness of the area. If one were to take a cross section of the delta at its widest point, one would find that the height variation from the mean over that 150 km is less than 2 m, which means that a minor sand deposition can cause major changes.

In very wet years, a part of the river's flow may extend along the Magweggana River (actually a northeastern distributary of the Okavango Delta) and enter the Zambezi River, bypassing the Kalahari.

== Sediment transport ==
The river carries annually 28,000 tonnes of suspended sediment and a similar amount of bedload to the terminal swamps. Most of the particulate sediment carried by the river is fine sand, with some silt and mud, thanks to the geological makeup of the Okavango River catchment which is largely underlain by Kalahari sand. There is low concentration of dissolved solids in the river water - around 40 mg/L, made up mostly of silica, calcium and magnesium bicarbonates - but these dissolved solids form the largest component of sediment carried into the delta because the annual water volume is so large.

== History ==
During colder periods in Earth's history, a part of the Kalahari was a massive lake, known as Lake Makgadikgadi. In this time, the Okavango would have been one of its largest tributaries.

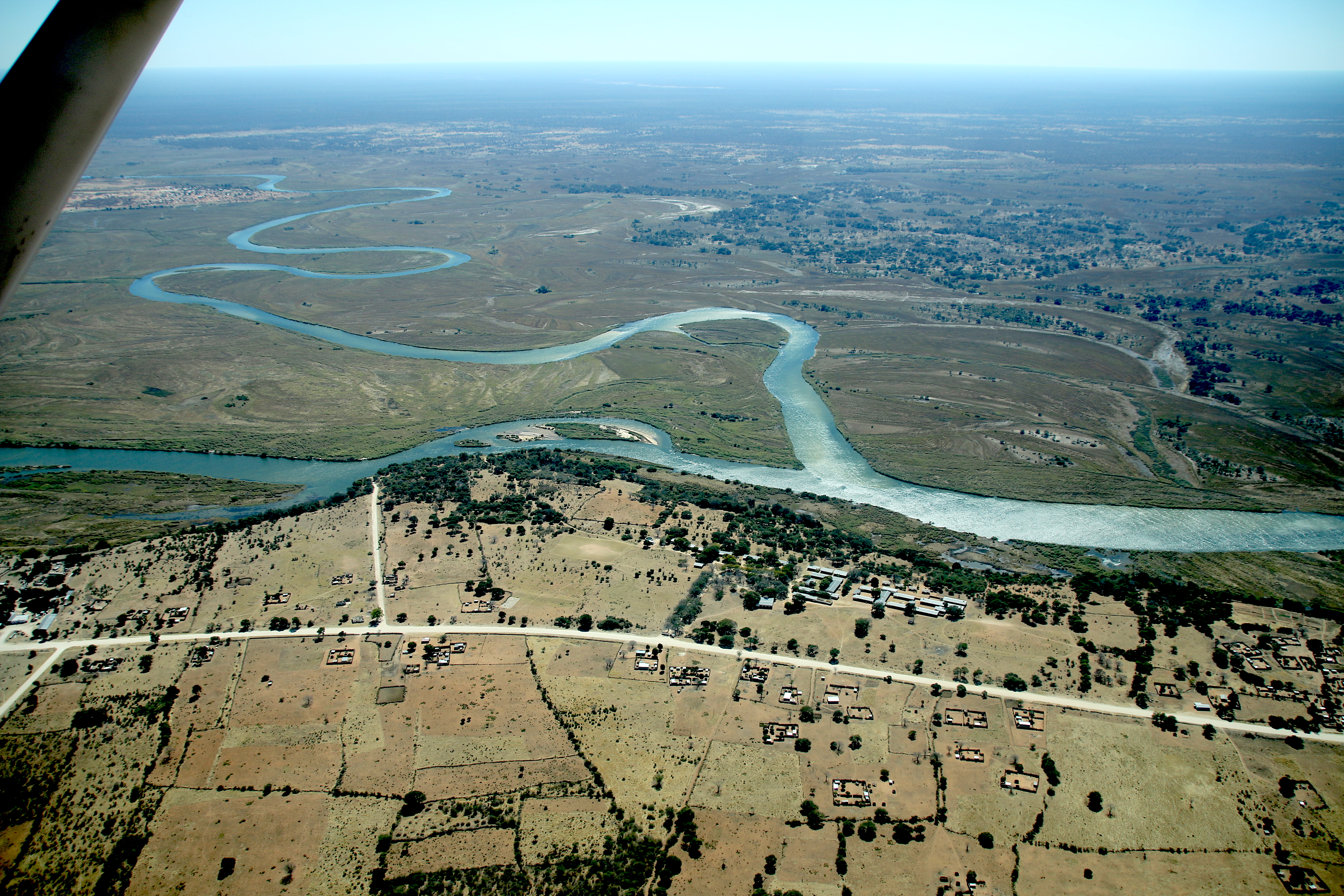
Confluence of Cuito (from top) and Okavango (flowing from left to right) (2018) 18°01′40″S 020°47′31″E

== Water conflict ==
Both Namibia and Botswana experience drought, and as a result, concerns have been expressed about possible conflict over use of the river's water. Namibia has built a water canal, measuring about 300 km long, and has proposed a project to build a 250 km pipeline to divert water from the river into Namibia to help relieve the drought.

Botswana, however, uses the Okavango Delta for both tourism income and a water source. The Department of Water Affairs in Botswana has submitted that 97% of the water in the river is lost through evaporation, so the country cannot afford to lose any extra water.

Namibia, in turn, has argued that it will only divert half of one percent of the river's flow, and that it is entitled to any water that flows through its territory. To deal with such issues, in September 1994, Angola, Namibia, and Botswana signed a multilateral agreement to form the Permanent Okavango River Basin Water Commission, to provide advice to the three countries about the best ways to share the Okavango River's resources.

=== Oil exploration ===
ReconAfrica, a petroleum exploration company headquartered in Canada, has obtained exploration licenses for more than 13,600 square miles of land in the former Kavango Region of Namibia and in Botswana. In January 2021 ReconAfrica announced the start of drilling operations on the first exploration well. Environmental activists have expressed concern that ReconAfrica's plans for its test wells have not been properly vetted through Namibia's environmental review process, however ReconAfrica and both the governments of Namibia and Botswana have stated that the company's activities have followed due process and that no fracking will occur. ReconAfrica's drilling area is in the Kavango West region which contains a multicountry conservation park, six locally managed wildlife reserves, and one UNESCO World Heritage site, however the drilling license does not include any of these protected areas.
