= Kavango East =

Region of Namibia

Coordinates: 18°20′S 20°35′E

- Region
- The Kavango East Region (red) in Namibia
- Country: Namibia
- Seat: Rundu

Government
  - Governor: Bonifatius Wakudumo (SWAPO)

Area
  - Total: 23,988 km^{2} (9,262 sq mi)

Population (2023 census)
  - Total: 218,421
  - Density: 9.1054/km^{2} (23.583/sq mi)
- Time zone: UTC+2 (CAT)
- Website: kavangoeastrc.gov.na

Kavango East is one of the fourteen regions of Namibia. Its capital is Rundu, its governor is Bonifatius Wakudumo. The region was created in 2013 when the Kavango Region was split into Kavango East and Kavango West. The only self-governing settlements in Kavango East are the capital Rundu and the village of Divundu.

The region contains the western half of the Caprivi Strip. In the north, Kavango East borders the Cuando Cubango Province of Angola, and in the south and southeast the North-West District of Botswana. Domestically, it borders the following regions:

- Zambezi – east
- Otjozondjupa – southwest
- Kavango West – west

Because of its rather high rainfall compared to most other parts of Namibia and its location on the Kavango River after which it is named, this region has agricultural potential for the cultivation of a variety of crops, as well as for organised forestry and agro-forestry, which stimulate furniture making and related industries. Kavango East and its sister region Kavango West are nevertheless the poorest regions in Namibia.

== Politics ==
The Fourth Delimitation Commission of Namibia, responsible for recommending on the country's administrative divisions suggested in August 2013 to split the Kavango Region into two. Then-president Hifikepunye Pohamba enacted the recommendations. As a result, two new regions of Kavango East and Kavango West were created. As of 2020, Kavango East had 80,450 registered voters.

=== Administrative division ===
Kavango East constituencies (2014)

The region is subdivided into six electoral constituencies:

- Mashare
- Mukwe
- Ndiyona
- Ndonga Linena
- Rundu Rural
- Rundu Urban

In the 2015 regional elections SWAPO won in all six constituencies and obtained 79% (2010: 73%) of all votes. In the 2020 regional election SWAPO was still the strongest party but its support dropped to 62% of the popular vote, and it lost Rundu Rural to an independent candidate.

=== Governors ===
1. Samuel Mbambo (2013–2020)
2. Bonifatius Wakudumo (2020–present)

== Transport ==
There is a particular dearth of north-south roads in the Region, apart from the Rundu-Grootfontein main road. Rundu has a small airstrip to accommodate medium-sized tourist or cargo aircraft in daylight only. The poor condition of the roads and the long distances had a negative effect on tourism; this situation was improved by the completion of the Trans–Caprivi Highway. A major highway connecting Rundu to western Kavango and the Ohangwena Region is under construction.

== Demographics ==
As of 2023, Kavango East has a population of 218,421 residents, of which 102,310 (47%) are male and 116,111 (53%) are female, with an annual growth rate of 3.9%. On average, a woman has 4.3 children. 56.9% of the population live in urban areas, and the other 43.1% live rural areas. The average population density is 9.1 people per km^{2}. Only 19.4% of the population has access to the internet, although 38.3% own a cellphone. The literacy rate is 82.0% in those older than 15 years. 14.1% of the population has never attended school, while 46.9% has at least some primary school, 18.8% has at least some secondary school, and 9.7% has at least some tertiary education. 84.7% of the population has access to safe drinking water, and 49.5% have access to a toilet facility. 42.6% have electricity sufficient for lighting in their homes. In terms of income, 32.5% make a living off of wages or a salary, 16.4% receive a pension, 14.8% work on farms, and 10.1% are employed in non-farming business.

Within the region, 46% of the population speaks Rukwangali natively, primarily in the Vakwangali and Mbunza tribes. 21% speak Bantu languages like Luchazi, 18% speak Rumanyo, 8% speak Thimbukushu, 5% speak other Namibian languages such as Oshiwambo, and 2% speak European languages.
