= Kavango West =

Region of Namibia

Coordinates: 18°15′S 18°55′E

- Region
- The Kavango West Region (red) in Namibia
- Country: Namibia
- Seat: Nkurenkuru

Government
  - Governor: Verna Sinimbo (SWAPO)

Area
  - Total: 24,591 km^{2} (9,495 sq mi)

Population (2023 census)
  - Total: 123,266
  - Density: 5.0126/km^{2} (12.983/sq mi)
- Time zone: UTC+2 (CAT)
- Website: kavangowestrc.gov.na

Kavango West is one of the fourteen regions of Namibia. Its capital and only self-governed settlement is Nkurenkuru, its governor is Verna Sinimbo. The Region was created in 2013 when the Kavango Region was split into Kavango East and Kavango West. In the north, Kavango West borders the Cuando Cubango Province of Angola. Domestically, it borders the regions of Kavango East to the east, Otjozondjupa to the south, Oshikoto to the west and Ohangwena to the northwest.

Because of its rather high rainfall compared to most other parts of Namibia and its location on the Kavango River after which it was named, this region has agricultural potential for the cultivation of a variety of crops, as well as for organised forestry and agro-forestry, which stimulates furniture making and related industries. Kavango West and its sister region Kavango East are nevertheless the poorest regions in Namibia.

== Politics ==
Kavango West constituencies (2014)

The Fourth Delimitation Commission of Namibia, responsible for recommending on the country's administrative divisions suggested in August 2013 to split the Kavango Region into two. The president Hifikepunye Pohamba enacted the recommendations. As a result, the new Regions of Kavango East and Kavango West have been created. As of 2020, Kavango West had 23,804 registered voters.

=== Administrative division ===
The region is subdivided into eight electoral constituencies:

- Kapako
- Mankumpi
- Mpungu
- Musese
- Ncamangoro
- Ncuncuni
- Nkurenkuru
- Tondoro

In the 2015 regional elections SWAPO won in all eight constituencies. SWAPO also won all constituencies in the 2020 regional election, all of them by a landslide, and with overall more than 90% of the votes.

=== Governors ===
The first governor of Kavango West was Samuel Mbambo, former governor of the Kavango Region and sitting governor of Kavango East. On 27 April 2014 Sirkka Ausiku, formerly permanent secretary of the Ministry of Regional and Local Government, Housing and Rural Development, was appointed. She kept her position in 2015 in president Hage Geingob's first and second government. In 2025, Verna Sinimbo was appointed governor.

== Population ==
The region is characterised by an extremely uneven population distribution. The interior is very sparsely inhabited, while the northernmost strip, especially along the Kavango River, has a high population concentration.

== Economy and infrastructure ==
Kavango, prior to the split, was the region with the highest poverty level in Namibia, more than 50% of the population were classified as poor. According to the 2012 Namibia Labour Force Survey, unemployment in the Kavango Region was 29.8% at the time. Economic activities included farming and tourism.

=== Transport ===
There is a particular dearth of north-south roads in the Region, apart from the Rundu-Grootfontein main road. The poor condition of the roads and the long distances have a negative effect on tourism; this situation was improved by the completion of the Trans–Caprivi Highway. A major highway connecting Rundu to western Kavango and the Ohangwena Region is under construction.

=== Oil exploration ===
Oil exploration in the Kavango West region, east of the Owambo Basin, is ongoing in 2026. ReconAfrica, a petroleum exploration company headquartered in Canada, has exploration licenses for more than 13,600 square miles of land in the Kavango West region of Namibia and in Botswana. In January 2021, ReconAfrica started drilling operations on the first exploration well. Environmental activists expressed concern that ReconAfrica's plans for its test wells had not been properly vetted through Namibia's environmental review process. However, ReconAfrica, and both the governments of Namibia and Botswana, have stated that the company's activities have followed due process and that no fracking will occur. The drilling license does not include any of the protected areas.

== Demographics ==
As of 2023, Kavango West has a population of 123,266 inhabitants, with an annual growth rate of 2.9%. Women outnumber men, with a population of 93 men for every 100 women. The fertility rate is 5.2 and the average household size is 5.5. 16.7% of the population is under 5, 28.8% 5 - 14, 30.9% 15 - 34, 16.4% 35 - 59, and 7.2% over 60. The region is majority rural, with only 8.5% of inhabitants living in urban areas compared to 91.5% in rural areas. The average population density is 5.0 people per km^{2}. Only 30.5% own cellphones, and only 10.1% has access to internet. The literacy rate is 77.9%. 17.6% of the population has never attended school. 80.4% of the population has access to clean drinking water, 21.8% toilet facilities, and 20.4% electricity. To receive income, 18.7% earn wages, 17.3% receive an old-age pension, 36.5% farm, and 5.7% work in non-farming business.
