= 2010 Namibian local and regional elections =

Namibia held elections for its local and regional councils on 26 and 27 November 2010. The terms of regional councillors and local authority representatives were originally set to expire in 2009. As a local and regional election in 2009 would have meant organising four different elections in one year, this part of the election was postponed and terms of office extended by one year.

== Regional election ==
Regional elections were contested on 101 seats in 13 regional councils.

== Local election ==
Local elections determine the population of the village, town, and city councils and have a direct influence on who will become mayor, as this position is elected among all councillors. Contrary to the regional elections, local elections in Namibia are determined by party, not by individual. There were 50 local authorities in Namibia with a total of 327 seats.

The ruling SWAPO Party obtained representation in all local councils and won 226 seats. Rally for Democracy and Progress (RDP), the official opposition, managed to get into 36 local councils with a total of 48 seats.

Party	Seats	+/–
SWAPO	226	+39
Rally for Democracy and Progress	48	+48
United Democratic Front	23	–3
Democratic Turnhalle Alliance	16	–16
National Unity Democratic Organisation	9	0
United People's Movement	3	+3
All People's Party	2	+2
Total	327	+24
