= Rundu =

Town in Namibia

- Town
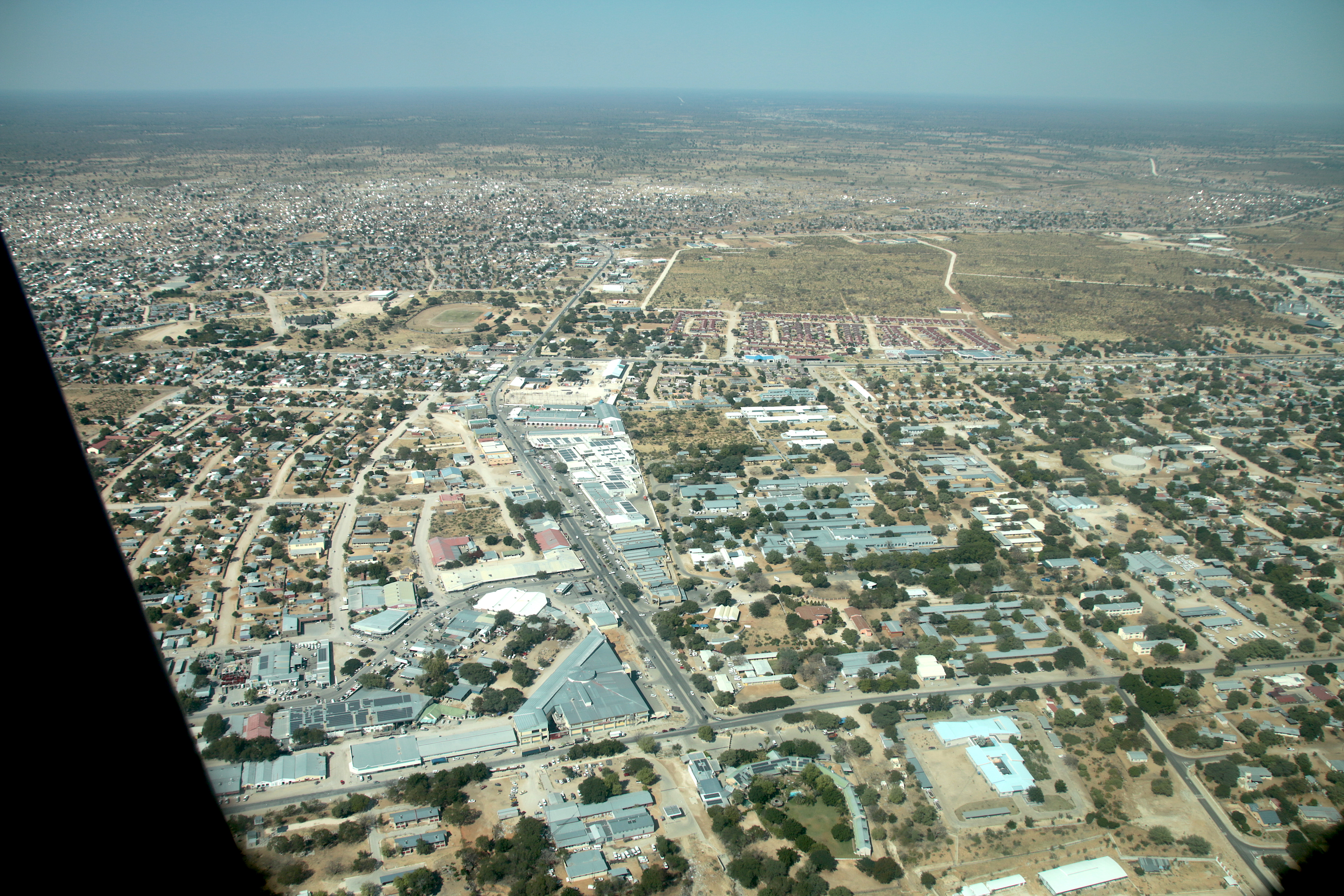
- Aerial view of Rundu, 2019

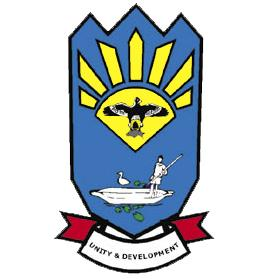
- Seal
- Nickname: Ru-town
- Motto(s): Unity & Development
- Location in Namibia
- Coordinates: 17°55′S 19°46′E
- Country: Namibia
- Region: Kavango-East Region
- Constituency: Rundu Urban constituency
- Established: 1936

Government
  - Type: Mayor-council government
  - Mayor: Andreas Jikerwa (SWAPO)

Area
  - Total: 156 km^{2} (60 sq mi)
- Elevation: 1,095 m (3,593 ft)

Population (2023 census)
  - Total: 118,632
  - Density: 760/km^{2} (1,970/sq mi)
- Time zone: UTC+2 (SAST)
- Area code: 066
- Climate: BSh
- Website: runducity.iway.na

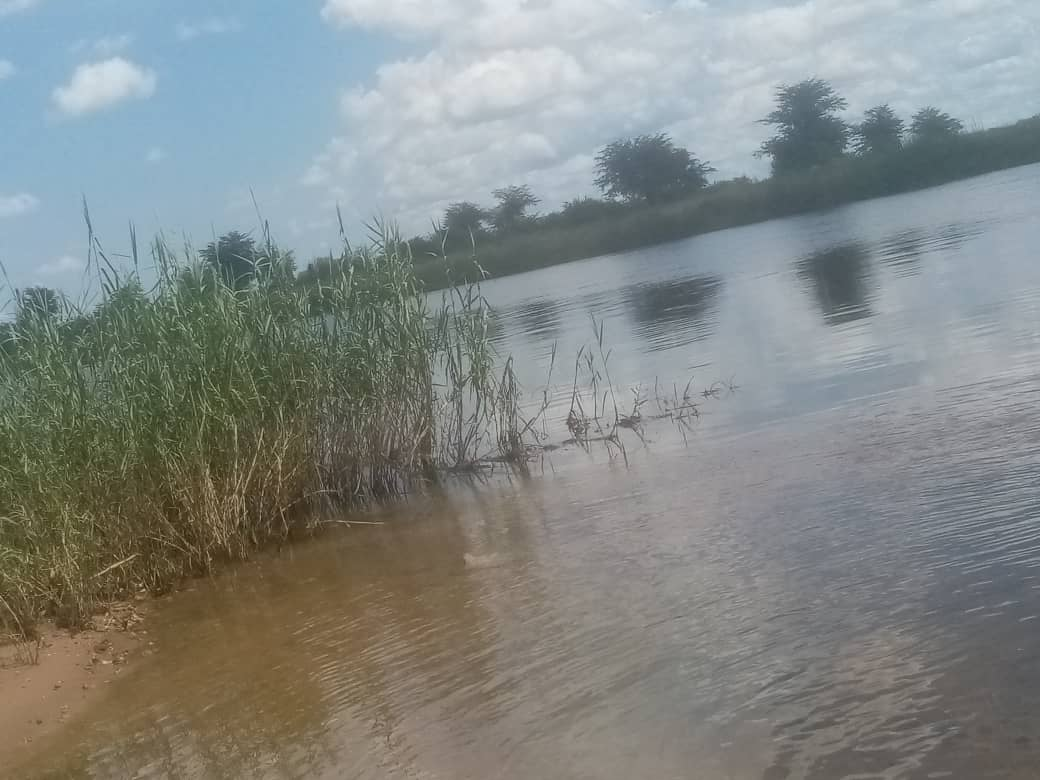
Kavango River, April 2023

Rundu is the capital and the largest city of the Kavango-East Region in northern Namibia. It lies on the border with Angola on the banks of the Kavango River, about 1,000 metres (3,300 feet) above sea level. Rundu's population is growing rapidly. The 2001 census counted 36,964 inhabitants; for the 2023 census it climbed to 118,632.

== History ==
In 1936, it became the seat of the local governor, replacing Nkurenkuru as the capital of the Kavango district. Since then, it has grown into a multilingual city of the Kavango region. Its official status was changed to that of a town.

Historical population
Year	Pop.	±% p.a.
2001	36,964	—
2011	63,431	+5.55%
2023	118,632	+5.36%

Since 1993, St. Mary's Cathedral has been the episcopal seat of the Roman Catholic Apostolic Vicariate of Rundu.

== Politics ==
Rundu is governed by a town council with seven seats. The 2015 local authority election was won by SWAPO, which gained five seats (6,973 votes). One seat each went to the local Rundu Concerned Citizens Association (1,043 votes) and the All People's Party (APP, 973 votes). SWAPO also won the 2020 local authority election, obtaining 3,548 votes and gaining four seats. One seat each went to the Rundu Concerned Citizens Association (863 votes), the Rundu Urban Community Commission (386 votes), and the Independent Patriots for Change (IPC), an opposition party formed in August 2020, that gained 321 votes.

== Geography ==
=== Localities ===
Many of Rundu's residents live in shacks. In 2020, the town had 18,219 informal housing structures, accommodating more than 76,000 inhabitants more than the most recent (2011) census reported as the total population figure.

The oldest houses in Rundu are in the Katutura area. The houses are mainly two-bedroom homes with large backyards, even though they are situated next to the central business district.

On the west is Tutungeni, which means "let's build". This area was previously occupied by executives of the white-dominated business place, but now it is open for any willing buyer in need of a quiet neighbourhood. On the East is Safari. There are the middle-priced houses built in the 1970s. The three main localities dominated Rundu residential life until the turn of the millennium in 2000, when new housing projects by O'B Davids Properties built a new residential area called Millennium Park. After that, two others were constructed by the NHE, Queens and Kings Parks, respectively. Recently, a new formal location was added, named Rainbow.

Outside the formal suburbs, shanty towns symbolise the rapid urbanisation of the town and high unemployment rates. Kehemu (Ghetto), Kaisosi (also known by the locals as Cali), Sauyemwa (SA), and Ndama are the most informal areas, while a fourth, Donkerhoek (Dark Corner), is rapidly becoming formal since the Build Together Campaign was begun in 1992.

=== Climate ===
Rundu

Climate chart (precipitation, max. and min. temperature)
J	F	M	A	M	J	J	A	S	O	N	D
151 31 19	134 30 19	91 30 18	32 29 15	4 29 10	0 26 6	0 26 6	0 30 9	2 33 14	19 35 18	59 33 19	79 32 19
- █ Average max. and min. temperatures in °C
- █ Precipitation totals in mm
- Source: World Climate Guide
Imperial conversion
J	F	M	A	M	J	J	A	S	O	N	D
5.9 88 66	5.3 86 66	3.6 86 64	1.3 84 59	0.2 84 50	0 79 43	0 79 43	0 86 48	0.1 91 57	0.7 95 64	2.3 91 66	3.1 90 66
- █ Average max. and min. temperatures in °F
- █ Precipitation totals in inches

Rundu has a hot semi-arid climate (Köppen: BSh), with hot summers and relatively mild winters (with warm days and chilly to cool nights). Even though it has a hot semi-arid climate, the area experiences high diurnal temperature variation during the winter with average high temperatures at roughly 26 °C (79 °F) and average low temperatures at 6 °C (43 °F). The large swing in daily temperature is more commonplace among areas with cold semi-arid climates. During the summer, the diurnal temperature variation is less pronounced. The average annual precipitation is 568 mm (22 in), although in the 2010/2011 rainy season 757 millimetres (29.8 in) were measured.

== Economy and infrastructure ==
=== Rundu Open Market ===
Rundu Open Market is the most well-known and the biggest open market in the town. It was founded in 1996 through cooperation between the government of Namibia and the government of Luxembourg.

=== Transport ===
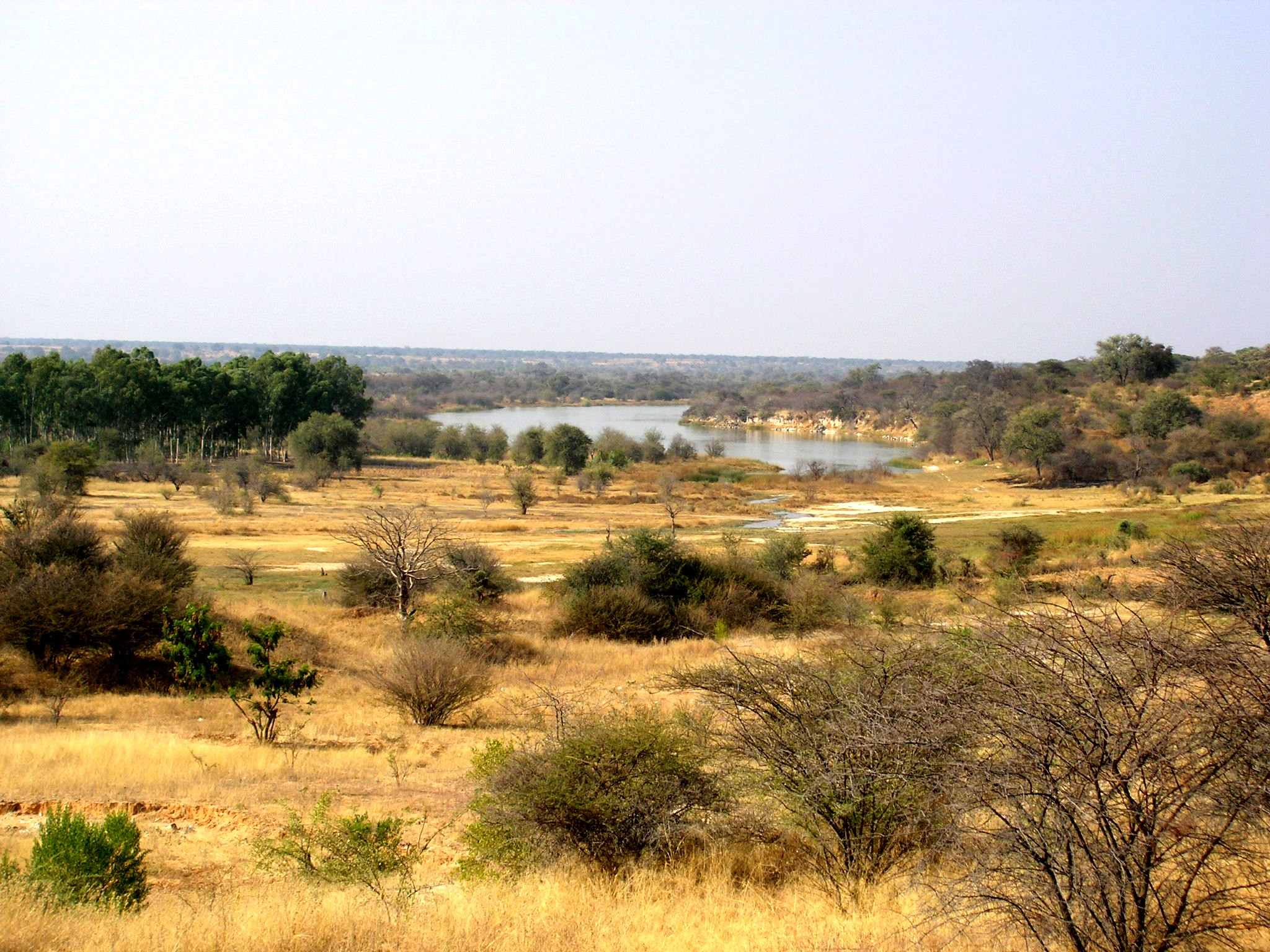
River Okavango near Rundu, August 2006

Rundu Airport, mostly used for tourism and cargo, is 5 kilometres (3.1 miles) southwest of the town.

The Rundu State Hospital is in the center of the town, off Markus Siwarongo street. It's the largest hospital in the Kavango East region of the country

=== Military ===
The Namibian Defence Force is in Rundu. Built in 1972, it was expanded in 1976, while South West Africa was under South African occupation. It houses 1,600 soldiers. The base was named Voito Jason Kondjeleni Military Base, after People's Liberation Army of Namibia (PLAN) fighter Voito Jason Kondjeleni, who died in 1983.

== Education and Culture ==
Rundu is home to many woodcarvers and features a woodcarver's market near the open market. Several local restaurants serve traditional food, including mahangu, ground nuts, stewed meats, and fish from the Okavango River.

=== Schools ===
There are five tertiary Institutions in Rundu, namely the University of Namibia, the Institute of Open Learning (IOL), the Rundu Vocational Training Centre, the Namibia College of Open Learning (NAMCOL), and Triumphant College. The Namibia University of Sciences and Technology has a centre which provides support for students who are studying at a distance. There are six secondary schools in the town: Rundu Secondary School, Dr. Alpo Mbamba Secondary School, Dr. Romanus Kampungu Secondary School, Elias Neromba Senior Secondary School, Noordgrens, and Kamunoko Secondary School.

== Twin towns – sister cities ==
Rundu is twinned with:

- Cheboksary, Chuvash Republic, Russia
- Nieuwegein, Netherlands
