= Regions of Namibia =

Namibian Regions
- Category: Unitary state
- Location: Republic of Namibia
- Number: 14
- Populations: 102,762 (Omaheke) – 494,605 (Khomas)
- Areas: 8,650 km^{2} (3,339 sq mi) (Oshana) – 161,510 km^{2} (62,361 sq mi) (ǁKaras Region)
- Government: Region Government, National government
- Subdivisions: Constituencies

Namibia uses regions as its first-level subnational administrative divisions. Since 2013, it has 14 regions which in turn are subdivided into 121 constituencies.

Upon Namibian independence, the pre-existing subdivisions from the South African administration were taken over. Since then, demarcations and numbers of regions and constituencies of Namibia are tabled by delimitation commissions and accepted or declined by the National Assembly.

In 1992, the 1st Delimitation Commission, chaired by Judge President Johan Strydom, proposed that Namibia should be divided into 13 regions. The suggestion was approved in the lower house, The National Assembly. In 2014, the 4th Delimitation Commission amended the number of regions to fourteen.

The most urbanised and economically active regions are the Khomas and Erongo region, with Khomas home to the capital, Windhoek, and Erongo home to Walvis Bay and Swakopmund.

The table below shows statistics from the 2023 Population and Housing Census:

Region	Area (km²)	Population	People per km^{2}	Average Household Size	Population growth %
Erongo	63,539	240,206	3.8	3.1	53
Hardap	109,781	106,680	1.0	3.6	34.2
Kavango East	23,988	218,421	9.1	5.3	59.6
Kavango West	24,591	123,266	5.0	5.5	42.5
Khomas	36,964	494,605	13.4	3.6	44.6
Kunene	115,260	120,762	1.0	3.8	39.0
Ohangwena	10,706	337,729	31.5	4.8	37.6
Omaheke	84,981	102,881	1.2	3.3	44.4
Omusati	26,551	316,671	11.9	4.2	30.2
Oshana	8,647	230,801	26.7	3.7	30.6
Oshikoto	38,685	257,302	6.7	4.1	41.4
Otjozondjupa	105,460	220,811	2.1	3.6	53.4
Zambezi	14,785	142,373	9.7	3.7	57.2
ǁKaras	161,514	109,893	0.7	3.1	41.9

== See also ==
- Constituencies of Namibia
- ISO 3166-2:NA
