= Administrative divisions of Namibia =

Namibia is divided into 14 regions subdivided, which are further subdivided into 121 constituencies. The administrative divisions of Namibia are tabled by Delimitation Commissions and accepted or declined by the National Assembly.

== History ==
Before the independence of Namibia, the territory was known as South-West Africa (before 1885 and between 1915 and 1989) and as German South-West Africa during the time of colonialisation by the German Empire (1885-1915).

During the South African administration it was considered the de facto fifth province of South Africa, although a formal request for annexation to the United Nations was turned down. The territory that became the independent state of Namibia on 21 March 1990 inherited the administrative division of this "province" which consisted of 26 districts. These districts remained until the First Delimitation Commission of Namibia tabled its recommendations in the National Assembly, and the latter approved and implemented them in 1992. Since then, Namibia is divided into regions which in turn are divided into constituencies.

== Delimitation Commissions ==
Delimitation Commissions are three-member bodies appointed by the president that make suggestions as to how Namibia should be administratively divided, considering only geographical changes like population grow and migration but not discriminating by ethnic factors. They are mentioned in articles 102-104 of the constitution, and they are to sit approximately once every ten years, although they sat more frequently before 2002.

The chairman of the Delimitation Commission must be a judge at either a High Court or the Supreme Court. This judge and the other two commission members are appointed by the president, subject to the approval of Parliament.

The five Delimitation Commissions of Namibia so far are:

Commission	Formed	Members	Decisions
1st	1990	Judge President Johan Strydom; Martin Shipanga; Gerhard Tötemeyer	Namibia divided into 13 Regions and 95 constituencies; Regions formally enacted by the Regional Councils Act of 1992
2nd	1998	Judge JP Karuaihe; Samuel Mbambo; Lazarus Hangula	Okavango Region renamed to Kavango Region; Number of constituencies raised to 102; Several boundary changes
3rd	2002	Judge Peter Shivute; Inge Murangi; Peter Kauluma	Number of constituencies raised to 107
4th	2013	Judge Alfred Siboleka; Zedekia Ngavirue; Jonathan Steytler	Kavango Region split into Kavango East and Kavango West; Number of constituencies raised to 121; Caprivi Region renamed to Zambezi Region; Karas Region renamed to ǁKaras Region; Several boundary changes; Several constituency name changes
5th	2024	Judge President Petrus Unengu; Prisca Anyolo; Gerhardt Gurirab; Penias Topnaar	Consultations ongoing

== Current administrative division ==
The 14 regions of Namibia

The current administrative division of Namibia is the result of the work of the Fourth Delimitation Commission, tabled in 2013. Namibia is divided into 14 regions and 121 constituencies.
