= 2004 Namibian local and regional elections =

Namibia held two subnational elections in 2004. Local Authority Council elections were held on 14 May 2004 and Regional Council elections on 29–30 November 2004.

== Results ==
=== Local Authority Councils ===
In the regions of Helao Nafidi and Outapi, only the South West Africa People's Organization (SWAPO) fielded any candidates, so no elections were held there and all SWAPO candidates were declared elected unopposed.

Party	Seats	+/–
SWAPO	187	0
Congress of Democrats	34	+34
Democratic Turnhalle Alliance	32	–7
United Democratic Front	26	0
National Unity Democratic Organisation	9	+9
Local Associations	9	–7
Republican Party	6	+6
Total	303	–27

=== Regional Councils ===
Party	Seats	+/–
SWAPO	96	+14
United Democratic Front	5	+2
National Unity Democratic Organisation	3	+3
Democratic Turnhalle Alliance	2	–14
SWANU	1	–1
Congress of Democrats	0	0
Republican Party	0	0
Namibian Democratic Movement for Change	0	0
Total	107	+5
