= 2015 Namibian local and regional elections =

Elections in Namibia

Namibia held elections for its local and regional councils on 27 November 2015. Ballots were cast using electronic voting.

== Electoral system ==
Elections to regional councils in Namibia are held using the first-past-the-post electoral system. Voters in each constituency elect one councillor to represent them on their regional council. Local authority councillors are elected by a system of proportional representation.

== Results ==
Regional and local elections taken together elected 199 women out of the 499 available seats, partly because affirmative action for women is required by law in local authority elections.

=== Regional elections ===
There were 121 constituency councillors to be elected. Each of them represented their constituency in the respective regional council. The regional councils in turn selected 3 representatives each to serve in the National Council.

In 28 constituencies, SWAPO was announced as the winner in October because no other party nominated a candidate.

Party	Seats	Change
South West Africa People's Organization	112	
National Unity Democratic Organisation	4	
Popular Democratic Movement	2	
United Democratic Front	1	
United People's Movement	1	
Independent politicians	1	
Total	121	

=== Local election ===
Local elections determine the population of the village, town, and city councils and have a direct influence on who will become mayor, as this position is elected among all councillors. Contrary to the regional elections, local elections in Namibia are determined by party, not by individual. There are 57 local authorities to be elected. In five of them (Okahao, Omuthiyagwiipundi, Oniipa, Outapi and Tsandi) SWAPO was announced as winner in October because no opposition party nominated a candidate.

Party	Seats	Change
South West Africa People's Organization	277	
Popular Democratic Movement	41	
United Democratic Front	21	
Rally for Democracy and Progress	16	
National Unity Democratic Organisation	11	
All People's Party	4	
United People's Movement	3	
Civic Association of Henties Bay	1	
Karibib Ratepayers Association	1	
Swakopmund Residents Association	1	
Congress of Democrats	1	
Rundu Concerned Citizens Association	1	
Total	378	
