= List of villages and settlements in Namibia =

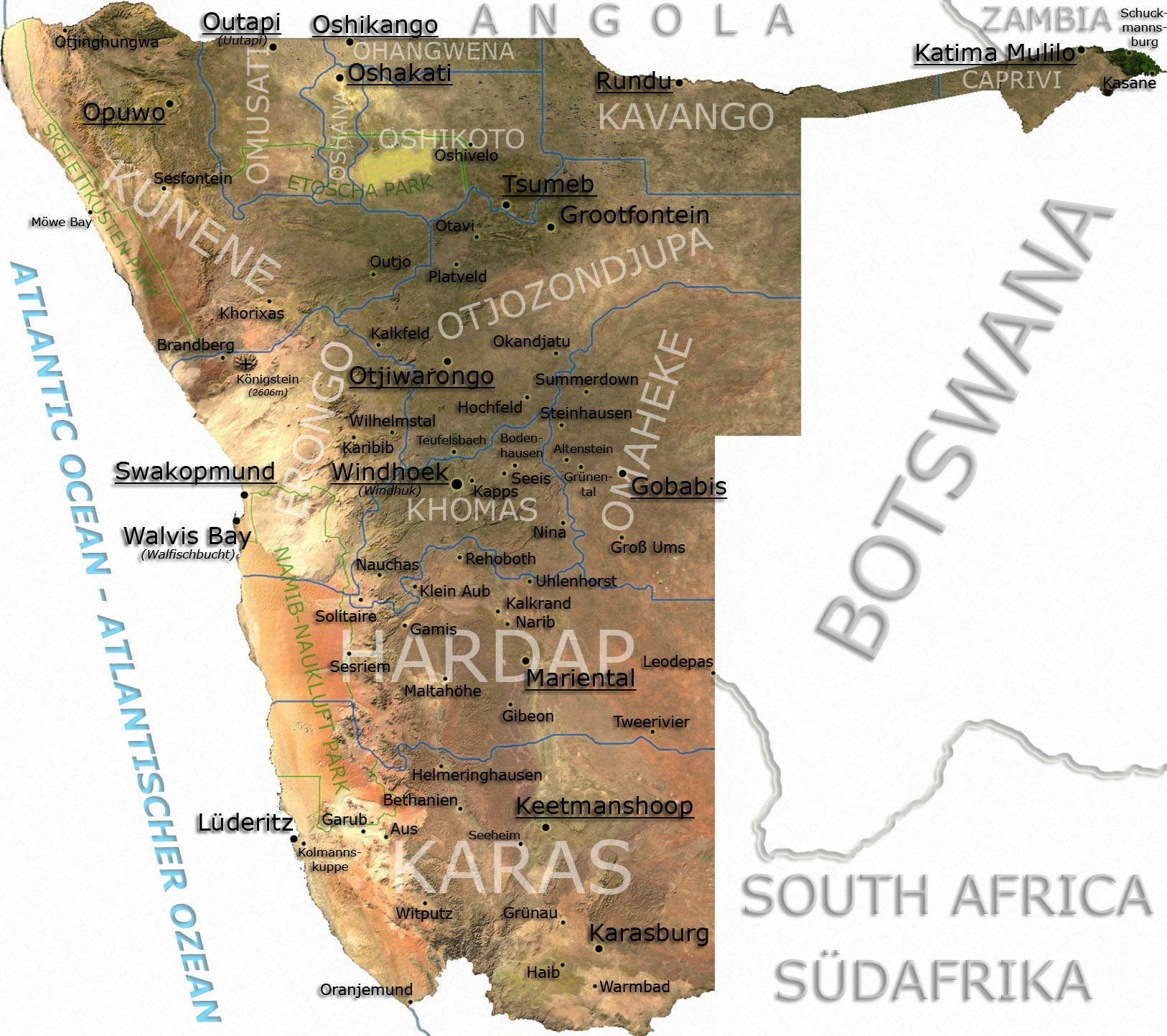
Namibia

Villages and settlements in Namibia are distinguished by the status the Government of Namibia has vested in them: Places in Namibia that are governed by a village council are villages, they are the smallest entities of local government. All other places except cities and towns are not self-governed, they are called settlements.

== Villages ==
As of 2015 Namibia has 18 villages, each of them governed by a village council of up to five seats. Village councils are elected locally and have the authority to set up facilities like water, sewerage and cemeteries without the approval of the Minister of Urban and Rural Development. They may also declare streets and public places, collect fees for the services they provide, and buy immovable property without asking for explicit approval. The eighteen villages are:

Villages in Namibia
Village	Region	Population	Notes
Aroab	ǁKaras	1,660	
Berseba	ǁKaras	784	
Bethanie	ǁKaras	1,748	
Koës	ǁKaras	1,530	
Tses	ǁKaras	1,365	
Gibeon	Hardap	2,631	
Gochas	Hardap	1,163	
Kalkrand	Hardap	1,238	
Stampriet	Hardap	1,947	
Maltahöhe	Hardap	2,379	
Divundu	Kavango East	746	
Kamanjab	Kunene	1,795	
Okongo	Ohangwena	2,236	
Leonardville	Omaheke	1,191	
Witvlei	Omaheke	1,768	
Otjinene	Omaheke	2,102	
Tsandi	Omusati	891	
Bukalo	Zambezi	600	

== Settlements ==
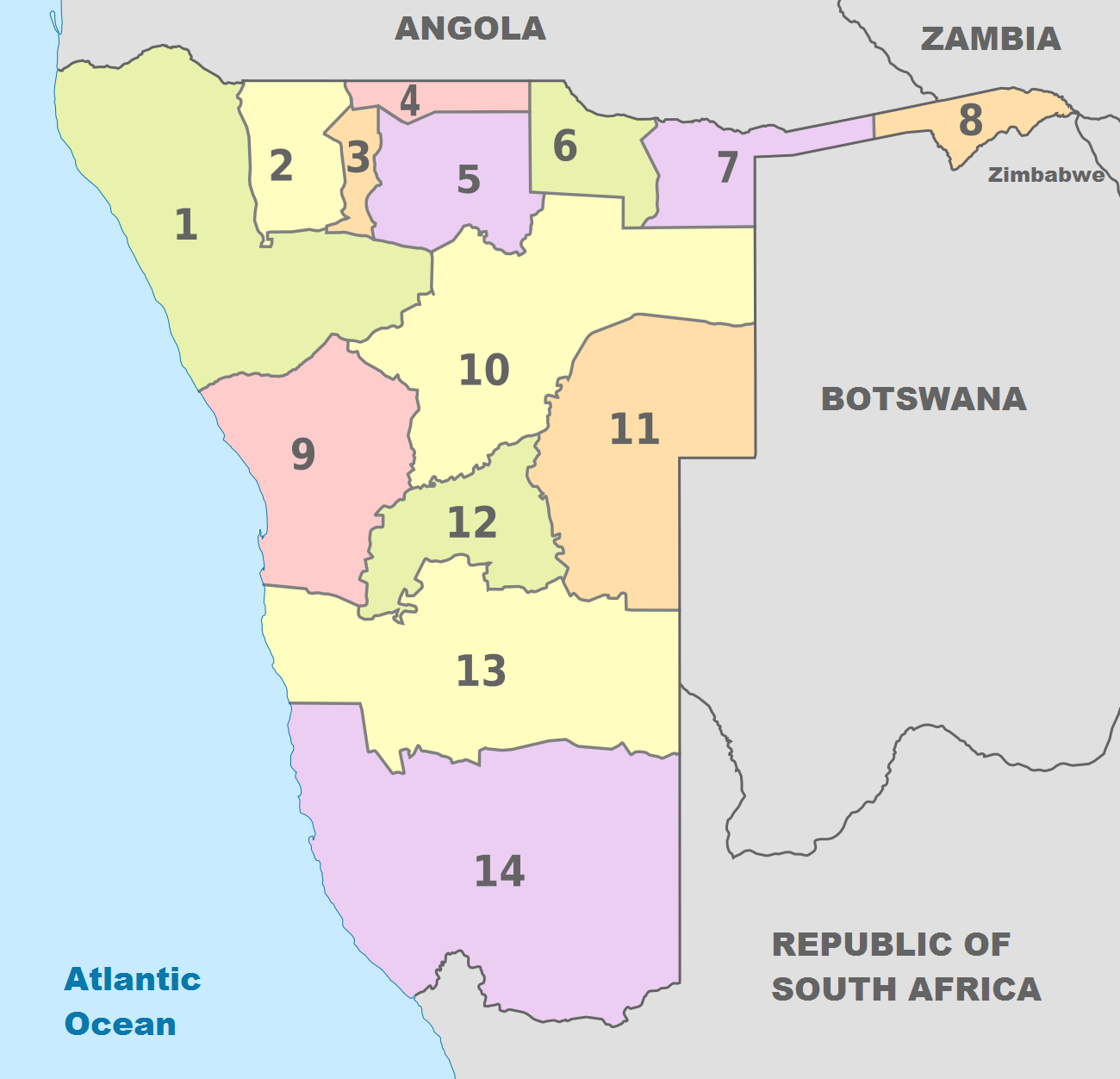
1. Kunene; 2. Omusati; 3. Oshana; 4. Ohangwena; 5. Oshikoto / 6. Kavango West; 7. Kavango East; 8. Zambezi; 9. Erongo; 10. Otjozondjupa / 11. Omaheke; 12. Khomas; 13. Hardap; 14. ǁKaras

Settlements in Namibia are non-self-governed populated places. While they may have a dedicated person responsible for their administration, this person is not elected but an employee of the respective regional administration. Some of the settlements in Namibia per Region are:

=== Kunene Region ===
- Fransfontein
- Ohamaremba, Epupa Constituency
- Okangwati, Epupa Constituency
- Otjomuru, Epupa Constituency
- Ovinjange
- Sesfontein

=== Omusati Region ===
- Anamulenge
- Elim
- Nakayale
- Ogongo
- Okakundu
- Okalongo
- Olupandu
- Ompakoya
- Omugulugwombashe
- Onawa
- Ongandjera
- Onhokolo
- Otindi

=== Oshana Region ===
- Eheke, administrative centre of the Ondangwa Rural constituency.
- Ekuku
- Oikango
- Okamule
- Omagongati
- Omashekediva
- Oniimwandi
- Otshaandja

=== Ohangwena Region ===
- Edundja
- Ekango Lomuve
- Epinga
- Epuku
- Etomba
- Okongo
- Oshikango
- Odibo, archdeaconry in northern Namibia
- Okanghudi
- Okatana, administrative centre of Okatana Constituency
- Okauva
- Omungwelume
- Onamunhama
- Onandova
- Ondeihaluka
- Ondeikela
- Ondobe Yomunghudi
- Onekwaya West
- Ongha
- Oshakati
- Oshandi
- Oshindobe

=== Oshikoto Region ===
- Iihongo
- King Kauluma Village
- Okambonde
- Olukonda
- Onamungundo
- Onayena, district capital of the Onayena Constituency
- Oniiwe
- Onkumbula
- Oshigambo
- Oshivelo
- Tsintsabis
- Uuyoka

=== Kavango West Region ===
- Bunya
- Kahenge
- Mpungu
- Ncamangoro, administrative centre of Ncamangoro Constituency
- Rupara
- Tondoro

=== Kavango East Region ===
- Andara
- Bagani
- Diyogha
- Kaisosi
- Kangongo
- Mashare
- Mile 30, 30 miles (48 km) south of Rundu
- Mupini
- Ndonga Linena, administrative centre of Ndonga Linena Constituency
- Nyangana
- Shinyungwe

=== Zambezi Region ===
- Chinchimane
- Ibbu
- Kabbe
- Kongola
- Lisikili
- Luhonono
- Nakabolelwa
- Ngoma
- Sangwali
- Sibbinda

=== Erongo Region ===
- Dolfynstrand
- Langstrand
- Okombahe
- Omatjette
- Otjimbingwe
- Uis
- Utuseb
- Wlotzkasbaken

=== Otjozondjupa Region ===
- Abenab
- Hochfeld
- Kalkfeld
- Kombat
- Okamatapati
- Osire
- Tsumkwe
- Vyf Rand

=== Omaheke Region ===
- Aminuis
- Buitepos
- Donkerbos
- Drimiopsis
- Eiseb
- Epukiro Post 3
- Ezorongondo
- Omitara
- Onderombapa
- Ovituua
- Sonneblom
- Tallismanus
- Tsjaka

=== Khomas Region ===
- Baumgartsbrunn
- Brakwater
- Döbra
- Dordabis
- Mix camp
- Neudamm
- Seeis
- Solitaire

=== Hardap Region ===
- Groot Aub
- Hoachanas
- Khauxas
- Klein Aub
- Uibis
- Rietoog
- Schlip

=== ǁKaras Region ===
- Ariamsvlei
- Asab
- Aus
- Aussenkehr - in the process of gaining town status
- Blouwes, north-east of Keetmanshoop
- Grünau
- Helmeringhausen
- Kosis
- Narubis
- Noordoewer
- Rosh Pinah
- Seeheim
- Snyfontein
- Warmbad

== See also ==
- List of cities and towns in Namibia
- Geography of Namibia
- Regions of Namibia
