= Okambonde =

- Location within Namibia
- Country: Namibia
- Region: Kunene
- Time zone: UTC+2 (SAST)

Okambonde is a village in the northern part of Namibia. It is situated just east of Oniipa and is one of the villages used as entrance into some of the Uukwanyama villages such as Oshaango, Onamukulo, Okongo, and Eenhana.

Okambonde village is divided into two parts that are separated by the main road from Ondangwa to Oshigambo. Okambonde A is on the right side of the road and Okambond B is on the left side of the road. Both parts are administered by one headman, Thomas Amuthenu. There are approximately 75 homesteads with an average of 6 people per homestead.

Homes are made of tree poles cut from the surrounding forest. Due to the high growth rate, suitable trees are becoming scarce and the forest is slowly disappearing. Alternative building materials such as bricks, mud, thatch, and mesh wire are now being used to construct homes.

Okambonde has rich fertile soil, and the economy is based on agriculture. Farming activities include mahangu cultivation, and herding cattle, goats, and donkeys. Poor rainfall means raising sheep or horses is difficult, but they are found in very low quantities. The community has one kindergarten, one primary school, one combined school and no high school. They have one soccer field, one volleyball field, and one netball court.

Currently, the power supply only reaches the schools and cuca shops but plans are underway to extend it to each homestead, and more development is to be started.
