= Okamatapati =

- Settlement
- Location in Namibia
- Coordinates: 20°24′S 18°13′E
- Country: Namibia
- Region: Otjozondjupa Region
- Constituency: Okakarara Constituency
- Established: 1960s

Area
  - Total: 3,096 km^{2} (1,195 sq mi)

Population (2016)
  - Total: 1,900
- Time zone: UTC+2 (South African Standard Time)

Okamatapati is a settlement in the Otjozondjupa Region of Namibia, situated 100 kilometres (62 mi) south of Grootfontein and 127 kilometres (79 mi) north of Otjinene. The name Okamatapati is derived from Omutapati, the Otjiherero name for the Mouse-eared combretum, a shrub that is common in the area.

Herero people were resettled to this area, then known as Hereroland, in the 1960s. The Odendaal Plan declared several bantustans, one for each tribe, and forced Blacks to vacate all other areas of then-South-West Africa. Okamatapati was situated at the western edge of the Herero area. An affluent community developed who soon elected their own tribal chiefs.

The Okamatapati Farmers Association was founded in 1983. It ran the first Okamatapati Show, an agricultural show for cattle farmers, in 1986. The show has been run for the 28th time in 2016 but is no longer conducted in Okamatapati. In 2012 it moved to Windhoek and became part of the Windhoek Show. Except a one-time stint at the Grootfontein Show in 2014 it is now held annually in Windhoek.

Today the area around Okamatapati is a conservancy of 3,096 square kilometres (1,195 sq mi) that has been established in 2005. In 2016 it had a population of 1,899 people. The conservancy consists of flat, sandy thornveld savannah and has an average annual rainfall of 350–400 millimetres (14–16 in). The main economic activity is cattle farming, particularly weaner production, which is supported by the occurrence of Terminalia sericea, a deciduous tree that the animals feed on during the dry season. Devil's claw is also harvested here.

The road from Otjinene to Grootfontein, an extension of the Trans-Kalahari Highway which passes Okamatapati, is currently being tarred. The work is expected to be completed in 2017.
