= Oshandi =

- Settlement
- Location within Namibia
- Coordinates: 17°27′S 16°12′E
- Country: Namibia
- Region: Ohangwena Region
- Constituency: Ondobe
- Time zone: UTC+2 (SAST)

Oshandi is a village in the Ohangwena Region of northern Namibia. It is the administrative centre Ondobe Constituency. Oshandi has a clinic and Anglican church that were established in 1947 by Canadian citizen Mark Dirnardo, who was a carpenter who came up with the idea of creating the hospital and church. The first headman of Oshandi village was Haufuku Kanyanye, who was Oshivambo speaking and the current headman is Paulus Hashoongo who is the native of Oshandi village. Oshandi village is situated on the very edge of Ovamboland.

In 1967, Oshandi hospital was destroyed by the Namibian War of Independence because at that time it was the only hospital that had medicine. The South African fighters destroyed the hospital because they wanted to take in the medication. After Namibian independence, Oshandi clinic was rebuilt while the hospital was transferred to Eenhana.

Today, Oshandi is one of the developing villages with health facility such as clinic and clean water. Since this clinic is close to the Angola border, most of the Angolan patients are also treated in Oshandi clinic.

The village is divided into 2 parts, the naturally untouched forest where herder mostly take their livestock for grazing and there are also some different types of wild animals such as lion, hyena and springbok. On the other side of the village is the town area where there are the clinic, church, electricity, open market or shopping area and the councilor's office.

It is 30 km from Eenhana, approximately 45 km, driving west of Oshikango and about 25 km from the Angolan-Namibia border. The village falls under the Uukwanyama Traditional Authority in Etomba. Constituency councillor is Hilaria Ndjuluwa (SWAPO) since 2020.

The village has approximately 3,500 inhabitants. Oshandi Combined School and Okaati (Ndonga: small tree) Combined School.

Oshandi village is surrounded by other villages such as Omungholyo, Okanghudi, Onhamunama, Etomba and Ohainengena.
