= Kahenge Constituency =

Former constituency in the former Kavango Region of Northern Namibia

Coordinates: 17.6889°S 18.6839°E

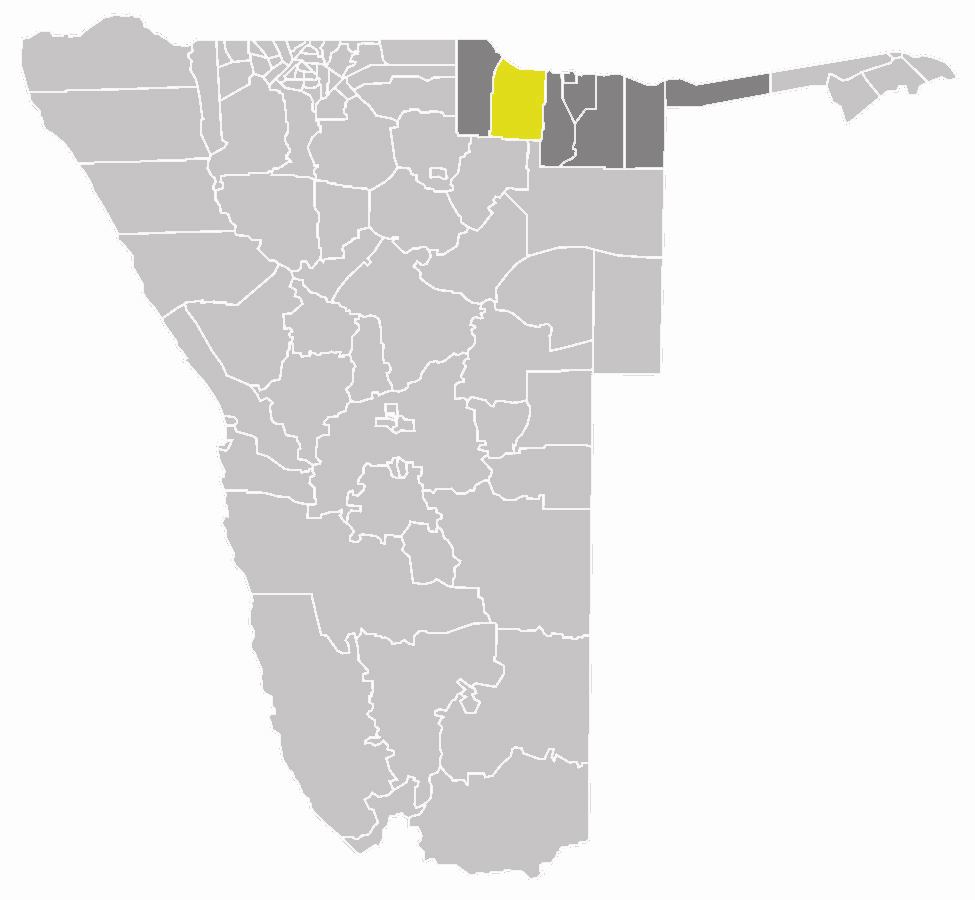
Location of Kahenge constituency (yellow) in the Kavango Region (dark grey)

Kahenge was a constituency in the Kavango Region of Namibia. The district centre was the settlement of Kahenge. It had a population of 29,799 in 2011, down from 30,903 in 2001.

The constituency contained the Okavango River settlements of Tondoro, Rupara, and Sambusu as well as the inland settlements of Mpanda and Mpuku.

Kahenge was a stronghold of the South West Africa People's Organization (SWAPO) party. In the 2004 regional election SWAPO candidate Sivaku Joseph Sikongo received 8,541 of the 8,908 votes cast.

In 2013 the Kavango Region was split into Kavango East and Kavango West. Kahenge Constituency was split into three constituencies. The western part became Tondoro (capital Kahenge), the north-eastern part became Musese (capital Rupara), and the south-eastern part formed the constituency Mankumpi (capital Satotwa).
