= Lydia Katjita =

Namibian politician

Personal details
- Born: 15 October 1953 (age 72) Omatjete, Erongo Region, Namibia

Lydia Katjita (born 15 October 1953 in Omatjete, Erongo Region, Namibia) is a former member of the National Assembly of Namibia and the Pan-African Parliament.

== Biography ==
Lydia Katjita was born 15 October 1953 in Omatjete in the Erongo Region of central Namibia. In 1989, she received a Higher Primary Education Certificate (HPEC) from the University of Namibia. She acquired a B.A. from the University of South Africa in 1996 and enrolled in the Master of Educational Management and Administration program at the University of Namibia the next year.

From 1980 to the start of her national political career in 1999, Katjita was a teacher. During this time, she held multiple other positions, including head of department for Sciences, Mathematics, English, and Afrikaans at the Ministry of Education in Grootfontein (1993–1999), member of the school board and management committee at Kalenga English Primary School (1993–1999), treasurer of the Evangelical Lutheran church in Grootfontein (1994–recent), chairperson of the Grootfontein Town Council (1995–1996), part-time teacher at the Namibian College of Open Learning (NAMCOL) in Grootfontein (1995–1999), and assistant researcher at the University of Namibia (1997).

== Political career ==
Katjita became a member of the third National Assembly of Namibia in 2000 (representing SWAPO) and remained in office until after the November 2004 Namibian parliamentary election. She focused especially on legislation affecting rural areas and was a member of the standing committees on Human Resources and Gender Development and on Privileges and Reports of the Ombudsperson. In 2002, she was appointed chairman of a parliamentary sub-committee to accept nominations for the Nobel Peace Prize in Namibia. Katjita was also a member of the Namibia branch of the Commonwealth Parliamentary Association and the Pan-African Parliament, where she was on the Justice and Human Rights Committee and the Pan-African Parliamentary Women Caucus. In July 2005, she was appointed secretary for administration and finance of the Pan African Women’s organization.
