= Abenab =

- Settlement
- Location within Namibia
- Coordinates: 19.294°S 18.094°E
- Country: Namibia
- Region: Otjozondjupa
- Constituency: Grootfontein
- Founded: 1921
- Time zone: UTC+2 (SAST)
- Climate: BSh

Abenab (Khoekhoe: climbing river) is a settlement in the Otjozondjupa Region of central Namibia, situated 32 kilometres (20 mi) north of Grootfontein. It was founded in 1921 as a mining settlement for a nearby lead, vanadium and zinc mine. The mine closed down in 1958.
