= Iyambo =

Iyambo is a surname. Notable people with the name include:

- Abraham Iyambo (1961–2013), Namibian politician
- Nickey Iyambo (born 1936), Namibian politician and physician
- Patrick Iyambo (1939–1991), Namibian politician

== See also ==
- Dr Abraham Iyambo Senior Secondary School, is a school in the Ohangwena Region of northern Namibia
