= Onawa =

Onawa may refer to:

== Places ==
- Onawa, Iowa, a city in Monona County, Iowa
- Onawa, Maine, a populated place in Piscataquis County, Maine
- Onawa, Namibia, a settlement in the Omusati Region, Namibia

== Other uses ==
- Onawa IOOF Opera House, an opera house in Onawa, Iowa
- Onawa train wreck, a 1919 railroad accident near Onawa, Maine
