= Tsumkwe Constituency =

Electoral constituency in the Otjozondjupa region of Namibia

Coordinates: 19°36′S 20°30′E

Tsumkwe constituency (red) in the Otjozondjupa Region

Tsumkwe Constituency is an electoral constituency in the Otjozondjupa Region of Namibia. It had 8,823 inhabitants in 2004 and 7,075 registered voters in 2020. The constituency consists of the settlement of Tsumkwe and the surrounding rural area.

Following a recommendation of the Second Delimitation Commission of Namibia, and in preparation of the 1998 general election, Tsumkwe Constituency was created in 1998 from the eastern part of Grootfontein Constituency.

Tsumkwe is referred to as a capital city of San people. About 2,400 San live in this constituency. It is a small town with about 500 inhabitants, located about 60 kilometres (37 mi) west of the Botswana border and 300 kilometres (190 mi) east of Grootfontein.

== Election results ==
=== Regional elections ===
Tsumkwe is traditionally a stronghold of the South West Africa People's Organization (SWAPO) party. In the 2004 regional election, SWAPO candidate Moses Coma received 1,920 of the 3,227 votes cast and became councillor.

The 2015 regional election was won by SWAPO's Fransina Ghauzz with 1,554 votes, followed by Ioma Gcao (NUDO) with 720 votes and Samuel R. Maharero (DTA) with 340 votes. The SWAPO candidate also won the 2020 regional election. Johannes Hausiku received 1,249 votes, Samson Ngombe (NUDO) came second with 981 votes.

=== Presidential elections ===
In the 2004 presidential election, Tsumkwe helped vote Hifikepunye Pohamba (SWAPO) to power who received 2,372 of the 4,015 votes cast. However, Kuaima Riruako of NUDO received over 21% of the constituency vote, well above his 4.23% nationally.

Summary of the 15 and 16 November 2004 Namibian presidential election results in Tsumkwe Constituency
Candidates - Parties	Votes	%
Hifikepunye Lucas Pohamba - Swapo party	2,372	59.07
Kuaima Riruako - National Unity Democratic Organization	846	21.07
Katuutire Kaura - Democratic Turnhalle Alliance	484	12.05
Ben Ulenga - Congress of Democrats	184	4.58
Kosie Pretorius - Monitor Action Group	69	1.71
Justus ǁGaroëb - United Democratic Front	44	1.09
Henk Mudge - Republican Party	16	.03
Total (turnout 90.47%)	4015	100.0
Source: Electoral Commission of Namibia
