= Omulonga Constituency =

Electoral constituency in the Ohangwena region of northern Namibia

Coordinates: 17°28′S 16°51′E

Omulonga constituency (red) in the Ohangwena Region of Namibia

Omulonga is a constituency in the Ohangwena Region of northern Namibia. It had 13,585 registered voters in 2020. The constituency office is located at Onamukulo, along the Ondobe-Oshigambo district road. Omulonga constituency covers an area of 597 km^{2} (231 sq mi). It had a population of 32,581 in 2011.

Omulonga Constituency was created in 2003 at the recommendation of the Third Delimitation Commission of Namibia, and in preparation of the 2004 general election. Its territory previously belonged to four different constituencies: Oshikango, Ondobe, Eenhana, and Endola. It contains the settlements of Onandova, Okaonde, Onaihenda, Ombalamumbwenge, Esaati, Onangwe, Oshali, Ohaukelo, Onashali, Omakondo, Omokolo, Ohepa, Onailonga, and Onamukulo.

== Politics ==
As is common in all constituencies of former Ovamboland, Namibia's ruling SWAPO Party has dominated elections since independence. In the 2004 regional election SWAPO candidate Anna Kufu received 8,759 of the 8,835 votes cast.

It won the 2015 regional election by a landslide. Its candidate Erickson Ndawanifa gathered 5,785 votes, while the only opposition candidate, Jona Thomas of the Rally for Democracy and Progress (RDP), received 140 votes. Councillor Ndawanifa of SWAPO was reelected in the 2020 regional election. He received 5,102 votes, far ahead of Lazarus Nangolo of the Independent Patriots for Change (IPC), an opposition party formed in August 2020, who obtained 833 votes.
