= Khauxas =

Khauxas is a small settlement in the Hardap Region of central Namibia. It is situated 45 km from Rehoboth and belongs to the Rehoboth Rural electoral constituency. Khauxas consists of 30 households with about 80 inhabitants. The village was electrified in 2011. It is home to a church and a school, the Petrus Vries Primary School.
