= Kosis =

- Settlement
- Location within Namibia
- Coordinates: 26°42′S 17°18′E
- Country: Namibia
- Region: ǁKaras Region
- Time zone: UTC+2 (South African Standard Time)

Kosis is a settlement in the ǁKaras Region of southern Namibia, situated approximately 120 km west of Keetmanshoop, not far from Bethanie.
