= Narubis =

- Settlement
- Location within Namibia
- Coordinates: 26.919°S 18.590°E
- Country: Namibia
- Region: ǁKaras
- Constituency: Keetmanshoop Rural
- Time zone: UTC+2 (South African Standard Time)

Narubis is a settlement in the ǁKaras Region of southern Namibia with post office, hotel and shops, situated off the national road B1 68 kilometres (42 mi) south-east of Keetmanshoop and 100 kilometres (62 mi) north-north-east of Karasburg. The name is of Khoekhoen origin and means 'place of Inaru trees', after the Euclea pseudebenus.
