= Neudamm, Namibia =

Settlement in Namibia

Coordinates: 22°30′17″S 17°22′09″E

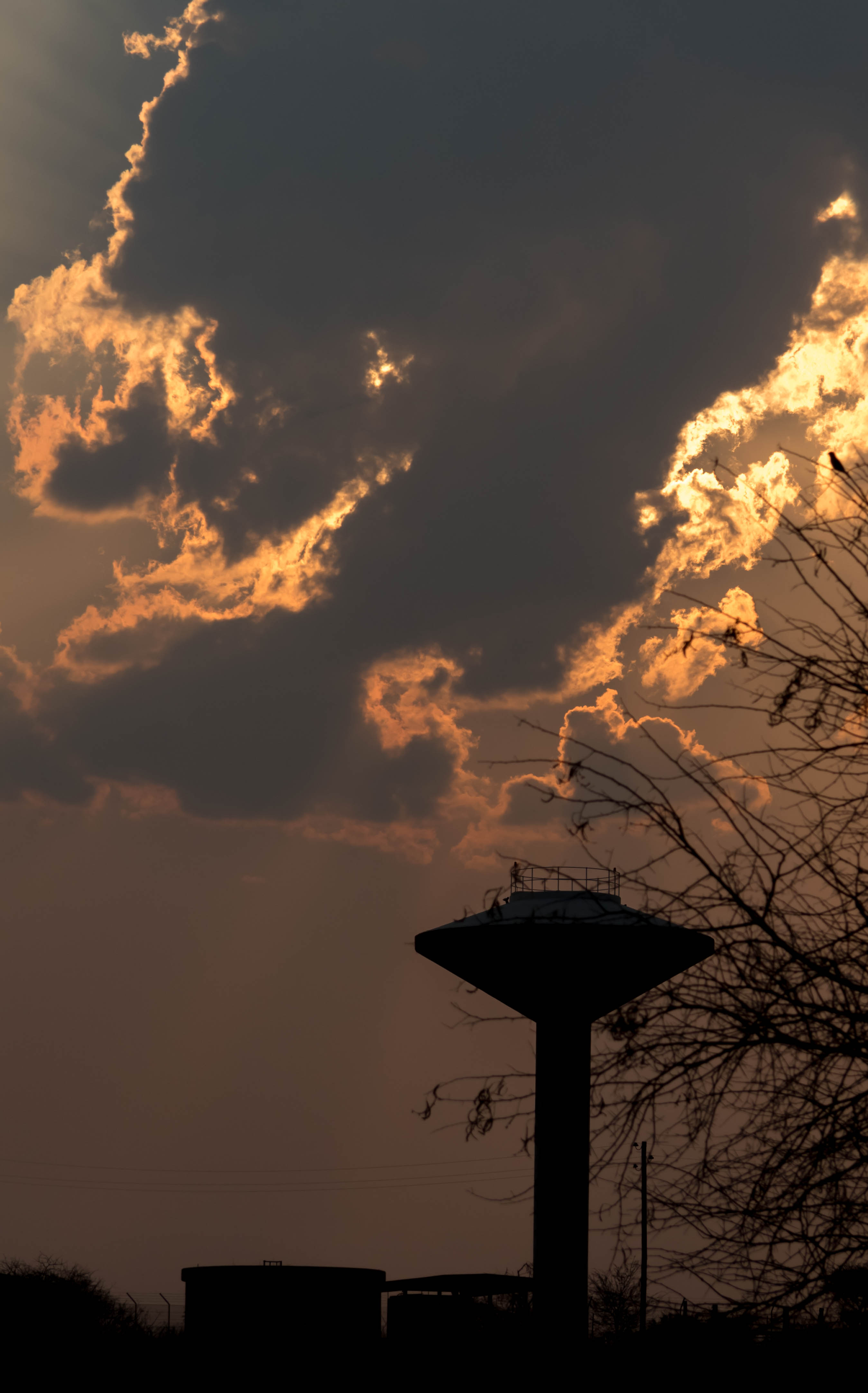
A sunset by the farm in 2015.

Neudamm is a farm and settlement in the Khomas Region of central Namibia, situated c. 30 kilometres (19 mi) east of Windhoek on the B6 to Gobabis, close to Windhoek's international airport. The entire area is today a campus of the University of Namibia for agricultural education and experimental farming.

The first mention of a farm in this area is recorded from 1897 when a grazing license was returned to the German South West African authorities due to the lack of water in this area. During the Herero and Nama War 1904–1907, livestock confiscated by the Imperial German troops was held here, and the first large dam in the territory was built. The dam gave the settlement and the farm its name (German: Neudamm: New dam).

An experimental farm was established at Neudamm in 1907, a post office was opened in the same year and was operational until World War I. The farm was upgraded to an agricultural research station in 1911. At this time, research was carried out at the station on practical questions of arable farming, in particular comparative cultivation trials with cereals and fodder plants, and trials with the dryland farming method. The results were published in Landwirtschaft!, a supplement to the official gazette for German South West Africa.

Agricultural education at Neudamm was established in 1928. In 1938 a hostel and a classrom was built, and Gammams Agricultural School was relocated from Windhoek to Neudamm. At that time, a karakul breeding programme was running at Neudamm.

The railway line from Windhoek to Gobabis was commissioned in 1930. Neudamm Railway Station is situated on this line.

The Agricultural School was closed in 1941 due to World War II. In 1955 Neudamm Agriculture College was established. The old installations from the 1930s are since called "Old Neudamm" and house Neudamm Experimental Farm. In 1996 the agricultural college was incorporated into the University of Namibia. It since forms the Neudamm Campus of the university.
