= Samuel Ankama =

Namibian politician (1957–2021)

The Honourable Chief Samuel Ankama MP

Personal details
- Born: 27 October 1957 Otshaandja, Oshana Region, South West Africa (now Namibia)
- Died: 4 July 2021 (aged 63) Ongwediva, Namibia
- Party: SWAPO
- Education: University of Maryland, Baltimore County; University of Warwick; University of Edinburgh
- Occupation: Politician
- Profession: Academic

Chief Samuel Ankama (27 October 1957 – 4 July 2021) was a Namibian politician, chieftain, and educator. A member of SWAPO, Ankama was a member of the National Assembly of Namibia from 2005 till 2021.

== Career ==
Ankama was an internal SWAPO activist beginning in the early 1980s. He was an Information Officer in various organisations, including the Council of Churches in Namibia and the SWAPO-affiliated National Union of Namibian Workers. In 1989, as Namibia's independence became closer, Ankama earned a bachelor's in education from the University of Edinburgh in Scotland. In 1992, Ankama became the first mayor of Oshakati. Ankama left that position in 1995 when he received a scholarship to study at the University of Warwick in England, where he graduated from in 1996 with an MA in language studies. In 2001, he received a Fulbright scholarship to study in the United States towards his Ph.D., which he earned in 2003 from the University of Maryland, Baltimore County in literacy and culture. His Ph.D. dissertation was in indigenous Namibian languages in the national education system. From 2003 to 2005, Ankama worked in several senior positions at the University of Namibia's northern campus in Oshakati. In 2005, he was selected for the SWAPO's list for the National Assembly at the 54th slot and was elected to the 4th National Assembly.

Prior to the 2009 elections, Ankama moved up to the 37th spot on SWAPO's electoral list. He was re-elected and appointed Deputy Minister of Works and Transport. In the Cabinet reshuffle following the fifth SWAPO congress in 2012, Chief Ankama swapped positions with Chief Kilus Nguvauva and was the Deputy Minister of Fisheries and Marine Resources.

He died of post COVID-19 related complications in Ongwediva, Oshana Region on 4 July 2021.
