= Anamulenge =

- Settlement
- Location in Namibia
- Coordinates: 17°29′40″S 15°00′52″E
- Country: Namibia
- Region: Omusati Region
- Constituency: Anamulenge Constituency
- Founded: 1927
- Time zone: UTC+2 (SAST)
- Languages: English, Afrikaans, German, Ovambo, local languages

Anamulenge is a settlement and former Catholic mission station in the Omusati Region in the north of Namibia in the Ombalantu tribal area. It is the centre of the Anamulenge Constituency.

Anamulenge was founded in 1927, 4 kilometres (2.5 mi) from the Nakayale mission station which the Finnish Missionary Society had founded in 1925.
