= Tondoro Constituency =

Electoral constituency in the Kavango West region of northern Namibia

Tondoro constituency (orange, centre left) in the Kavango West region of Namibia

Tondoro Constituency is an electoral constituency in the Kavango West Region of Namibia. Tondoro Constituency was named after the town and mission station Tondoro.

In 2013 the Kavango Region was split into Kavango East and Kavango West. Tondoro was formed from the western half of the former Kahenge Constituency.

== Politics ==
As in all Kavango West constituencies, SWAPO won the 2015 regional election by a landslide. Joseph Sivaku Sikongo received 3,528 votes, followed by Peter Mutuku of the All People's Party (APP, 173 votes). For the 2020 regional election no opposition candidate was fielded, and the sitting SWAPO councillor was duly re-elected.

== See also ==
- Administrative divisions of Namibia
