= Oikango =

Settlement in Oshana, Namibia

Coordinates: 17°51′22″S 15°47′37″E

Oikango is a settlement in the Oshana Region of northern Namibia, situated 10 kilometres (6.2 mi) from Ongwediva, and next to the settlement of Omashekediva. It belongs to the Ongwediva electoral constituency. The headman of this village is Gabriel Shaduka Shilongo.

The population is approximately 2087 people.. People in this village speak the Oshikwanyama and Oshindonga dialects of the Oshiwambo language. Many homesteads practice subsistence farming which serves as the main sources of food and income. The main soccer team is Bitter-star.

Oikango Combined School is situated in the settlement.
