= Tsumkwe =

Tsumkwe Tjumǃkui
- Settlement
- Location within Namibia
- Coordinates: 19.59°S 20.50°E
- Country: Namibia
- Region: Otjozondjupa Region
- Constituency: Tsumkwe Constituency

Population (2012)
  - Total: 500
- Time zone: UTC+2 (SAST)
- Climate: BSh

Tsumkwe (Juǀʼhoan: Tjumǃkui) is a settlement in the Otjozondjupa Region of northeastern Namibia and the district capital of the Tsumkwe electoral constituency. It had about 500 inhabitants in 2012.

== People ==
Tsumkwe is known as the capital of the San people in Namibia.

- Nǃxau ǂToma

== Nature and wildlife ==
The area associated with Tsumkwe exhibits notable vegetation and wildlife. Particularly within the Khaudum National Park (Tswana: Kaudwane), lions, cheetahs, hyenas and other large mammals can be found. The African wild dog has notable packs within the area.
