= Kahenge =

- Settlement
- Location within Namibia
- Coordinates: 17°41′S 18°41′E
- Country: Namibia
- Region: Kavango West
- Constituency: Kahenge Constituency
- Time zone: UTC+2 (SAST)
- Climate: BSh

Kahenge is a village in the Kavango West Region of northern Namibia. It is located 130 kilometres (81 mi) west of Rundu and is the administrative centre of the Kahenge Constituency.
