= Rehoboth Rural =

Electoral constituency in Hardap region, Namibia

Coordinates: 23°19′S 17°5′E

Rehoboth Rural constituency (red) in the Hardap Region

Rehoboth Rural is an electoral constituency in the Hardap region of Namibia. It had a population of 7,288 in 2011, down from 7,524 in 2001. Rehoboth Rural covers an area of 10,959 km^{2} (4,231 sq mi). The constituency office is in Schlip. Other settlements in Rehoboth Rural are Klein Aub, Khauxas and Rietoog. As of 2020, the constituency had 4,701 registered voters.

== Politics ==
Rehoboth Rural is traditionally a stronghold of the South West Africa People's Organization (SWAPO) party.

=== Regional elections ===
In the 2004 regional election, SWAPO candidate Trougott Claassen received 1,035 of the 2,217 votes cast and became councillor.

The 2015 regional elections were won by Riaan Charles McNab of SWAPO with 1,113 votes. Petrus Johannes Mouton of the United People's Movement (UPM) came second with 389 votes, followed by Norbet Ralph Ludwig (RDP, 202 votes) and Samuel Benjamin de Groot (DTA, 141 votes). The 2020 regional election was narrowly won by Gershon Dausab of the Landless People's Movement (LPM, a new party registered in 2018). He obtained 935 votes. The sitting councillor McNab (SWAPO) came second with 745 votes.

=== Presidential elections ===
In the 2009 presidential elections, 2,512 residents cast a ballot. Katuutire Kaura of the Democratic Turnhalle Alliance (DTA) won the constituency with 1,114 total votes (44.3%). Behind Kaura were Frans Migub ǀGoagoseb of the Namibian Democratic Movement for Change (674 votes or 26.8%) and Hidipo Hamutenya of the Rally for Democracy and Progress (RDP) placed 3rd with 332 votes (13.2%). Incumbent President, SWAPO candidate and winner of 75.1% of all votes nationally Hifikepunye Pohamba received only 19 votes for less than 1% of the total vote in the constituency; it was the only constituency in the country which gave Pohamba less than 900 votes.
