= Onamukulo =

Coordinates: 17°41′03″S 16°03′36″E

Onamukulo is a village in the Ohangwena Region of northern Namibia. It is the administrative centre of Omulonga Constituency.

Onamukulo village is divided into two parts and is separated by the main road running through from Ondangwa to Oshigambo. The two parts of the village are known as Omiye (the cuca shops side, on the right side of the road) and the true village (on the left side of the road) but run and administered by one headman, Tom Nakathingo. It has 80 homesteads with an average of 5 people per homestead. The inhabitants in this village have homesteads made of tree poles cut in the forest found in Okaonde area. But due to the high growth rate, suitable trees are now becoming scarce, and the forest is slowly but surely being destroyed, which has led the new generation planning to build houses to use alternative materials, such as bricks, mud, thatch, mesh-wires, etc. Onamukulo is rich in fertile soils, thus they depend on farming for survival. Their farming activities include mahangu cultivation, herding cattle, goats and donkeys, but the village usually receives poor rainfall, and thus they have difficulties in keeping sheep and horses, although they are found in very low quantities. Currently, the power supply reaches the combined school and cucashops, but plans to extend it to each homestead are in progress, and more development is to be started after this.

The Onamukulu Combined School is situated in the village. It is reasonably well equipped, including computer equipment to science equipment. The principal is Naftal Haimene. The school was refurbished with the help of Millennium Challenge Account Namibia (MCAN) along with 9 other schools in the Ohangwena Region of Namibia.
