= Cuca shop =

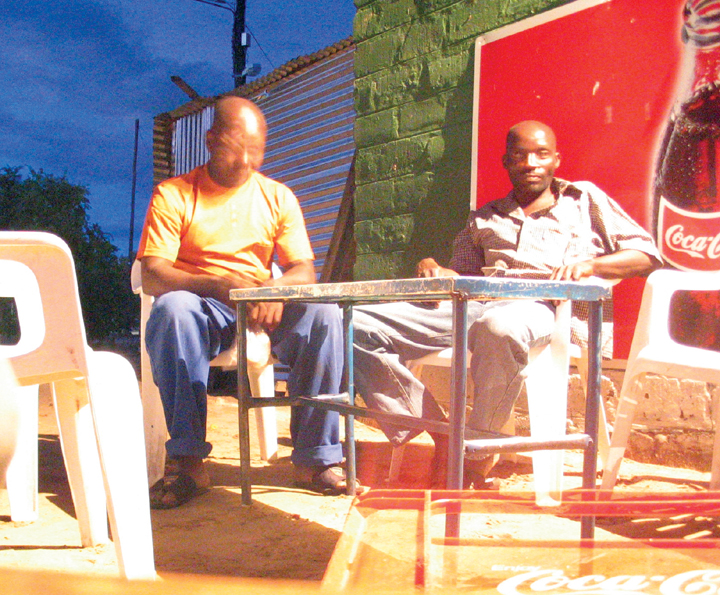
A cuca Shop Okankolo, Namibia

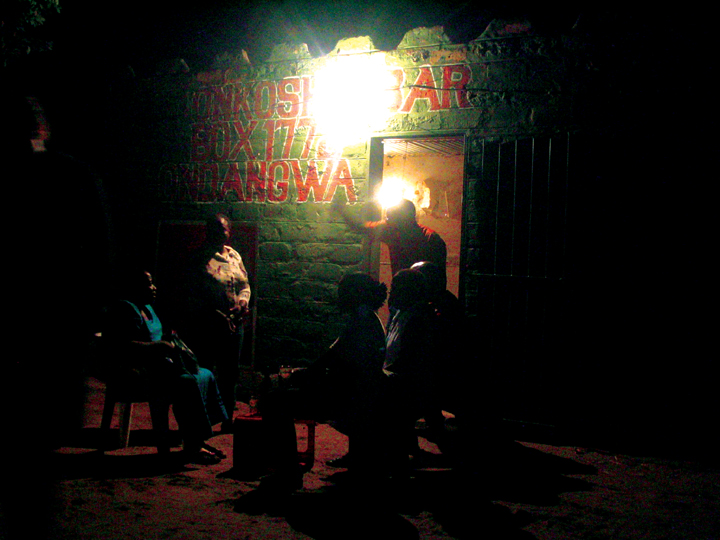
A cuca Shop Okankolo, Namibia

A Cuca shop is a Southern African term for a "Shebeen"—an unlicensed house selling alcoholic liquor.

The term is used in Namibia and Angola, and is derived from a Portuguese make of Cuca beer, which was available in Angola (then a Portuguese colony) during the 1960s and the 1970s. South African Defence Force troops, who patrolled the northern area during the bush war, frequently purchased mahango beer and Owambo liquor at these tin shack shebeens.

== In popular culture ==
The term "Cuca shop" featured prominently in the launch edition of Hai Ti!, a Creative-Commons released comic strip that spread the word about the ways that computers and the internet can transform learners' and teachers' lives. Hai Ti! was created by School Net Namibia, a nonprofit provider of internet service, hardware and training to the schools of Namibia.
