= Tsjaka =

Coordinates: 22.7619°S 19.2025°E

- Settlement
- Interactive map of Tsjaka
- Region: Omaheke Region
- Constituency: Kalahari Constituency
- Time zone: UTC+2 (South African Standard Time)

Tsjaka is a settlement in the Omaheke Region in eastern Namibia. Located approximately 50 kilometres (31 mi) south of the regional capital Gobabis, it is inhabited primarily by the Tswana and San people. The village can only be reached by a gravel road via the C22 regional road.

Tsjaka belongs to the Kalahari Constituency of Omaheke Region. The settlement features a centre of the Komeho Development Agency, a non-governmental organisation that also provides accommodation facilities for visitors, several farms in the radius of 50 kilometres and a primary school. The Mphe Thuto Primary School serves 440 learners from the settlement and the neighbouring farms and location. The main economic activity is subsistence farming with goats and sheep.
