= Omashekediva =

Settlement in Namibia

Coordinates: 17°47′S 15°50′E

Omashekediva is a settlement near Oikango village in the Oshana Region of northern Namibia. It belongs to the Ongwediva electoral constituency and has an estimated population of about 2,000 people.

There are two schools in Omashekediva, Omashekediva Primary School, established in 1976, and Omashekediva Combined School, constructed in 1988.
