= Ibbu, Namibia =

Ibbu
- Settlement
- Location within Namibia
- Coordinates: 17.94983°S 24.516478°E
- Country: Namibia
- Region: Zambezi Region
- Constituency: Katima Mulilo Rural
- Elevation: 933 m (3,061 ft)
- Time zone: UTC+2 (SAST)

Ibbu is a settlement in Namibia's Zambezi Region, located 80 kilometres southeast of the region's capital, Katima Mulilo. It falls under the Katima Rural Constituency and has its own medical facility, Ibbu Clinic.
