= Ondeikela =

Coordinates: 17°28′S 16°51′E

Ondeikela is a village in Ohangwena Region, Namibia, in Omulonga Constituency.

Ondeikela was established in 1900 by Kakili kaHelenge (brother to Shapange shaHelenge). Ondeikela had 50 houses in the beginning, but has grown. Villagers are leaving to Okavango Region to find land for grazing.
