= Okauva =

- Settlement
- Location within Namibia
- Coordinates: 17°32′S 17°01′E
- Country: Namibia
- Region: Ohangwena
- Constituency: Ondobe
- Time zone: UTC+2 (SAST)

Okauva is a village in Ohangwena Region, in Namibia. The village is home to around 8000 people and belongs to the Ondobe electoral constituency. It has a school which offers grade 1 to 10. Most students completed secondary education and some are pursuing certain professions at tertiary institutions. The main economic activity in this village is farming and livestock. It neighbours Okanghudi, Etomba and Onamunama villages.
