= Etayi Constituency =

Electoral constituency in the Omusati region of northern Namibia

Coordinates: 17°33′S 15°31′E

Etayi Constituency (red) in the Omusati Region

Etayi Constituency is an electoral constituency in the Omusati Region of Namibia. It had 16,716 registered voters in 2020. Its district capital is the settlement of Etayi. Etayi Constituency was created in 1998 from existing constituencies of Omusati, following a recommendation of the Second Delimitation Commission of Namibia, and in preparation of the 1998 general election.

The constituency covers an area of 644 km^{2} (249 sq mi). It had a population of 35,101 in 2011, down from 35,130 in 2001. It contains the settlements of Iipandayamiti, Oneheke, Onheleiwa, Otindi, Ekangolinene, Oshivanda, Onamhindi, Omutundungu, Olupandu, Onampira, Otshikuyu, Okaleke, Oshipya, and Oikokola.

== Politics ==
Like all other constituencies in Omusati, Etayi constituency is traditionally a stronghold of the South West Africa People's Organization (SWAPO) party. The 2004 regional election was won by SWAPO politician Bernardius Petrus Shekutamba. He received 11,099 of the 11,204 votes cast.

SWAPO also won the 2015 regional election by a landslide. Elisa Johannes gained 7,890 votes, while Sisilia Andreas of the Rally for Democracy and Progress (RDP) gained only 160. The SWAPO candidate also won the 2020 regional election by a large margin. Hans Haikali obtained 6,296 votes, followed by Apollos Haipindi of the Independent Patriots for Change (IPC), an opposition party formed in August 2020, with 877 votes.
