= Mupini =

- Settlement
- Location in Namibia
- Coordinates: 17°51′52.37″S 19°37′27.56″E
- Country: Namibia
- Region: Kavango East
- Established: 1932
- Time zone: UTC+2 (South African Standard Time)

Mupini (pronunciation: [mˈpini]) is a settlement and former mission station of the Finnish Missionary Society in Kavango West, Namibia. It is located along the Kavango River about 18 km to the northwest of Rundu and 62 km east of Rupara.

== History ==
In 1932 the Finns were planning to found a new mission station within the tribe of Mbundža, and Pastor Aatu Järvinen (later Järvineva) had chosen a site called Ruuga for this purpose and bought it for the Finnish Mission. Ms. Kyllikki Alava (1899–1941) was sent there, but she found out that the Catholics had occupied the site and were already building the foundations for their houses. However, Järvinen had prepared himself for this eventuality, and he had agreed with a local English administrator that the Finns could instead have a place called Mupini, which was conveniently located on a small plateau some distance from the Kavango River. Thus in 1932, Kyllikki Alava became the first Finnish missionary in Mupini.

In 1934 she married Albinus (Alpo) Ojonen (1898–1942), and after that they worked at Mupini together, until both fell ill and died in South West Africa.
