= Ompakoya =

Coordinates: 17°34′S 14°54′E

Ompakoya is a settlement in the Omusati Region of northern Namibia. It is situated around 8 kilometres (5.0 mi) from the town of Outapi, on the main road MR123 to the district capital Tsandi.
