= Oshindobe =

- Village
- Interactive map of Oshindobe
- Coordinates: 17.433364°S 15.584271°E

Population
  - Estimate (2015): 4,500

Oshindobe is a village located in the northern part of Namibia, within the Ohangwena Region. The village is named after Lake Ondobe, as revealed by an elder. It is situated on the edge of the Owambo region, also known as the "4 Os region," and lies within the Cuvelai-Etosha basin, a transboundary catchment area shared by Angola and Namibia. The village experiences a semi-arid climate characterized by high rainfall variability, resulting in frequent droughts and floods.

The two primary sources of water for Oshindobe originate from Angola: the upper Cuvelai Basin and the Epumbu-Omadenga water pipeline, which occasionally provides drinking water. Residents often rely on hand-dug wells, known locally as 'omifimas,' and seasonal shallow water flows (Efundja) in the Oshana (Oshana sha shaNguulu) between Oshindobe and Eengwena. In 1992, the communities of Oshindobe and Eengwena collaborated to dig a lake between the villages to store water for the dry season, despite high evaporation rates.

Oshindobe faces challenges such as soil degradation, loss of grazing areas, and unequal land distribution.

A notable characteristic of Oshindobe village is its high population density compared to other areas of the country. The village features a significant presence of people, livestock, shebeens (bars), and markets, all coexisting in a seemingly informal arrangement.

== Location ==
Oshindobe village is surrounded by the neighboring villages of Oshali, Okaku, Oikokola-North, Eengwena, Okambebe, and Ondobe Yomunghudi. It is located 45 km north of Oshakati (approximately a 43-minute drive), 36.6 km west of Oshikango (approximately a 39-minute drive), and about 9 km from the Angola-Namibia border (approximately a 9-minute drive). The village of Oshindobe falls under the Oukwanyama traditional authority in the Ohaingu section and is part of the Ongenga constituency. Leonard Shimutwikeni (SWAPO) served as the constituency councilor from the 1990s until he was succeeded by Sackaria Haimunghudi in November 2016. The current headman of Oshindobe village is Lucas Shilumbu Vaendwanawa, who inherited the position from his grandfather Komeya.

== Description ==
Oshindobe has a population of approximately 4,500 inhabitants, who primarily rely on agriculture and the informal sector for subsistence. Societal issues in the village are largely due to disparities in income distribution, unemployment, and poverty, with 80% of the population living below the poverty threshold. The Namibian government has faced challenges in enhancing communal subsistence, integrating the Oshindobe community into the national cash economy, and improving living standards.

Children in Oshindobe attend Immanuel-Uahengo Combined School (formerly Okamukwa Primary School, located 4 km southeast of Oshindobe) and Oikokola Combined School (4 km west of Oshindobe). These schools serve most of the lower primary and junior secondary students in the area. Onashinge Kindergarten is the only educational institution in Oshindobe and operates under the Omutaku tree. Entrepreneurs in Oshindobe have established businesses such as open markets, bottle stores, and minor developments like pounding machines. Essential services, including clinics and church services (ELCIN), are available in the nearby settlement of Okambebe, 8 km away. Several houses in Oshindobe have access to electricity provided by NORED and a rural water scheme.
