= Otindi =

Coordinates: 17°32′S 15°34′E

Otindi is a settlement in Etayi Constituency, Omusati Region, Namibia. In 2011, 44 homesteads in the village were evacuated after heavy rain flooded the area. A police officer in Oshakati who lived in Otindi said of the flooding, "The whole area is under water, making it difficult for the people to prepare food. Our property has been destroyed, including our food. We have nothing left; we look upon our government to help us".

Otindi shares borders with villages such as Omukondobolo, Enoleu, Onelombo, Etayi village as well as Oinikanika village. Makanda Junior Primary school, offering grades 1-7 is on the border between Otindi village and Omukondobolo village.
