= Neudamm railway station =

Railway station in Namibia

Coordinates: 22°30′17″S 17°22′09″E

Neudamm railway station is a railway station serving the settlement of Neudamm, today a campus of the University of Namibia and an experimental farm. It is part of the TransNamib Railway, located c. 30 kilometres (19 mi) east of Windhoek along the 228 kilometres (142 mi) Windhoek to Gobabis line. This line was built in 1929/1930.

== See also ==
- Railway stations in Namibia
