= Bunya, Namibia =

Coordinates: 17.865°S 19.360°E

Bunya is a settlement in the north of Namibia. It is situated 45 kilometres (28 mi) west of Rundu and belongs to the Kapako Constituency.

Major employers in the village include a Catholic mission and a hospital, while other residents derive their income from farming. The village school, Bunya Combined School, provides places for children in grades one to ten. A bakery supplies bread; other produce is bought from larger nearby towns.
