= Nangula Nelulu Uaandja =

Namibian chartered accountant and businesswoman

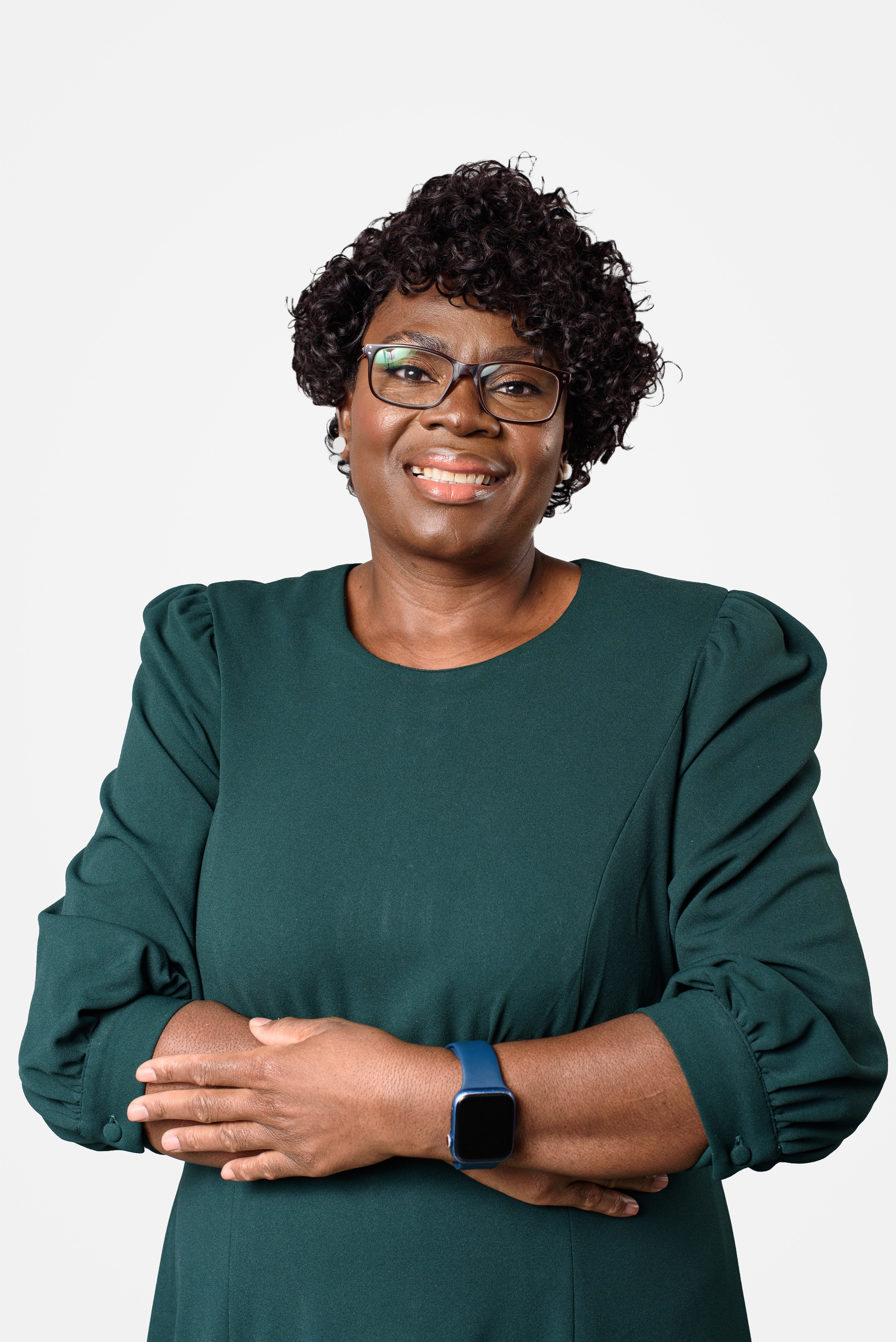
Nangula Nelulu Uaandja in 2024

Nangula Nelulu Uaandja is a Namibian chartered accountant. She was the Chief Executive Director for the Namibia Investment Promotion and Development Board (NIPDB) before it was integrated into the Ministry of International Relations and Trade (MIRT) in 2025. Uaandja became Namibia's first black female chartered accountant in 1998. In 2022, she has been named one the 100 most influential African Women by Avance Media.

== Education ==
Uaandja was born in Etomba in the Ohangwena region. From 1988 to 1992 Uaandja attended high school in Sierra Leone. Upon her return to Namibia in the early 1990s, Nangula enrolled at the University of Namibia (UNAM) to do a Bachelor of Commerce. She graduated from UNAM in 1996 and enrolled for an honours degree with the University of South Africa (Unisa) in 1997. In 1998 she completed her final chartered accounting qualifying exams.

== Work ==
Uaandja was appointed Chief Executive Director of the Namibia Investment Promotion and Development Board (NIPDB) by president Hage Geingob. She has also been involved in non-audit work such as consulting, fraud investigation, and budgetary processes. Uaandja served in various roles on accounting and auditing professional bodies such as the Institute of Chartered Accountants and the Public Accountants and Auditors Board. She also served as a member of the Tax Court Appeal and was appointed as a member of the first Public Office Bearers’ Remuneration and Benefits Committee by president Hifikepunye Pohamba from 2006 to 2009.
