= Otjombinde Constituency =

Electoral constituency in the Omaheke region of eastern Namibia

Coordinates: 21°50′S 20°45′E

Otjombinde constituency (red) in the Omaheke Region of Namibia

Otjombinde Constituency (until 1998 Otjozondjou Constituency) is an electoral constituency in the Omaheke Region of Namibia. It had 4,879 registered voters in 2020. The district capital of the constituency as well as its main economic hub is the settlement Tallismanus. Otjombinde Constituency had a population of 6,851 in 2011, up from 6,560 in 2001.

The constituency covers an area of 18,925 km^{2} (7,307 sq mi). It forms part of the border between Namibia and Botswana but does not have a border post. Otjombinde Constituency contains the settlements of Eiseb, Helena,Rietfontein,Sterrewag,and Otjiyere. The constituency is inhabited by Ovambanderu and San people. San settlements include Donkerbos and Sonneblom.

== Politics ==
Otjombinde is one of the few Namibian constituencies not dominated by the SWAPO Party. In the 2004 regional elections, Jeremiah Ndjoze of the South West Africa National Union (SWANU) was elected with 709 of the 2,453 votes cast.

The 2015 regional election was won by Katjanna Kaurivi, an independent candidate, with 1,396 votes. Karri Marenga (SWAPO) finished second with 681 votes, followed by Jeremiah Ndjoze (SWANU) with 267 votes and Lukas Katjiremba of the Democratic Turnhalle Alliance (DTA) with 134 votes. The 2020 regional election was won by Wenzel Kavaka (SWAPO) who obtained 911 votes. Bethuel Mbuende (SWANU) came second with 685 votes, followed by Edwardt Hiangoro of the Landless People's Movement (LPM, a new party registered in 2018, 390 votes) and Werner Kambato of the National Unity Democratic Organisation (NUDO, 326 votes).
