= Ondobe Constituency =

Electoral constituency in the Ohangwena region of northern Namibia

Coordinates: 17°31′S 16°3′E

Ondobe constituency (red) in the Ohangwena Region of Namibia

Ondobe is a constituency in the Ohangwena Region of Namibia. It had 16,286 registered voters in 2020.

Ondobe Constituency covers an area of 1,810 km^{2} (700 sq mi). It contains the village of Okanghudi, the birthplace of Hifikepunye Pohamba, the second President of Namibia. The constituency office is located at Oshandi. It had a population of 23,954 in 2011, up from 22,253 in 2001. When in 2003 Omulonga Constituency was created at the recommendation of the Third Delimitation Commission of Namibia, and in preparation of the 2004 general election, Ondobe lost part of its territory and its inhabitants to the new constituency.

The constituency is sharing boundaries with Cunene Province in southern Angola in the North, Omulonga Constituency in the South, Omundaungilo Constituency in the North-East part, Eenhana in the South-East and Oshikango in the West.

== Politics ==
As is common in all constituencies of former Owamboland, Namibia's ruling SWAPO Party has dominated elections since independence. In the 2004 regional election SWAPO candidate Mandume Natangwe Pohamba received 7,079 of the 7,108 votes cast.

SWAPO also won the 2015 regional election by a landslide. Councillor Pohamba was reelected with 6,498 votes, while the only opposition candidate, Levi Shifoleni of the Rally for Democracy and Progress (RDP), received 225 votes. SWAPO also won the 2020 regional election. Its candidate Hilaria Ndjuluwa received 5,753 votes, far ahead of Salom Hedimbi of the Independent Patriots for Change (IPC), an opposition party formed in August 2020, who obtained 866 votes.
