= Sonneblom =

- Settlement
- Location in Namibia
- Coordinates: 21°36′S 20°28′E
- Country: Namibia
- Region: Omaheke Region
- Constituency: Otjombinde Constituency
- Elevation: 4,124 ft (1,257 m)
- Time zone: UTC+2 (South African Standard Time)

Sonneblom (Afrikaans: sunflower) is a settlement in the remote East of Namibia in the Omaheke Region, situated 260 kilometres (160 mi) from the regional capital Gobabis.

It belongs to the Otjombinde electoral constituency in the Kalahari Desert, near hunting grounds of the San people, who moved here long before the village was established. They still form the majority population of Donkerbos. Donkerbos Primary School serves 200 learners of both Sonneblom and the neighboring hamlet of Donkerbos.

== Development and infrastructure ==
Sonneblom is outside the coverage of all mobile communication networks. It does not have electricity or landline telephone service and is not connected to Namibia's water and sewerage system. School and village share one borehole. The access road off D1692 is a bumpy 30 km (19 mi) sand track only accessible by 4x4.
