= Schlip =

- Settlement
- Location within Namibia
- Coordinates: 24°02′S 17°10′E
- Country: Namibia
- Region: Hardap
- Constituency: Rehoboth Rural

Population (2016)
  - Total: 1,500
- Time zone: UTC+2 (South African Standard Time)

Schlip is a settlement of about 1,500 inhabitants in the Hardap Region of central Namibia. It is situated on the unpaved road D1254 about 40 miles south of Rehoboth and has two primary schools and a junior secondary school.

Schlip is the administrative centre of the Rehoboth Rural constituency. It is also the main settlement of the ǁOgain (Groot Doden) clan of the Nama people.
