= Ekango Lomuve =

Village in northern Namibia

Ekango Lomuve is a village in the Ohangwena Region of northern Namibia. It belongs to Okongo Constituency. This village was founded in 1961 by Joseph Shinyongo, who built the first house here and subsequently served as village head. When Joseph Shinyongo died 27/10/ 2000, his son Temus Shinyongo succeeded him as headman.

Ekango Lomuve (Ndonga: Pan of Omuve Tree) is an Oshiwambo reference to its location in a pan with one distinguished Omuve tree.
