= Ovituua =

Settlement in Omaheke Region, Namibia

Ovituua is a settlement in the Epukiro Constituency of the Omaheke Region in Namibia.
