= Oshikunde Constituency =

Electoral constituency in the Ohangwena region of northern Namibia

Oshikunde constituency (red) in the Ohangwena Region of Namibia

Oshikunde Constituency is an electoral constituency in the Ohangwena Region of Namibia. As of 2020, it has 8,062 registered voters.

Oshikunde Constituency was created in August 2013 from the western part of Okongo Constituency, following a recommendation of the Fourth Delimitation Commission of Namibia, and in preparation of the 2014 general election. The administrative centre of Oshikunde Constituency is the settlement of Omutwewomunu.

The constituency is sharing boundaries with Cunene Province in Southern Angola in the North, Oshikoto Region in the South, Okongo Constituency in the East, and Omundaungilo and Epembe in the North-West and North-East respectively.

== Politics ==
As is common in all constituencies of former Owamboland, Namibia's ruling SWAPO Party has dominated elections since independence.

It won the 2015 regional election by a landslide. Its candidate Lonia Kaishungu-Shinana gathered 4,049 votes, while the only opposition candidate, Martin Hailonga of the Rally for Democracy and Progress (RDP), received 72 votes. Councillor Kaishungu was reelected in the 2020 regional election with 3,796 votes. Distant runner-up was Joshua Haunawa of the Independent Patriots for Change (IPC), an opposition party formed in August 2020, who obtained 344 votes.

== Education ==
The Dr Abraham Iyambo Senior Secondary School is located in the constituency.

== See also ==
- Administrative divisions of Namibia
