= Onandova =

Human settlement in Namibia

Coordinates: 17°37′S 15°57′E

Onandova is a settlement in the Ohangwena Region of northern Namibia. The village is situated at the east side of the Ondangwa–Oshikango Road between Ongha and Okakwa. It belongs to the Omulonga Constituency. St Francis church of the Anglican Church of Southern Africa, Diocese of Namibia, is situated here.

Onandova is an important seat of the Oukwanyama Traditional Authority. Traditional court is held here.
