= Rietoog =

Settlement in the Hardap region of Namibia

- Settlement
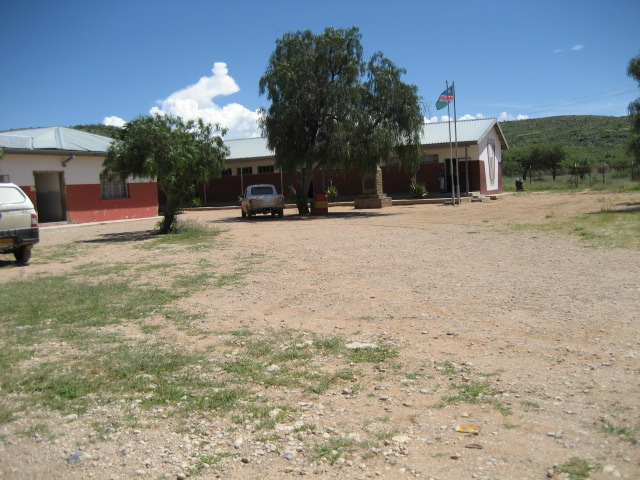
- WJD Cloete Junior Secondary School

- Location in Namibia
- Coordinates: 23°58′S 16°33′E
- Country: Namibia
- Region: Hardap Region
- Constituency: Rehoboth Rural
- Time zone: UTC+2 (South African Standard Time)
- Climate: BWk

Rietoog is a settlement in the Hardap Region of Namibia. It is situated 112 kilometres (70 mi) southwest of Rehoboth and 130 kilometres (81 mi) north of Maltahöhe along the M47 gravel road and belongs to the Rehoboth Rural electoral constituency. The name Rietoog means Cane-eye in Afrikaans, named after a spring that looks like an eye, surrounded by canes, near the town.

== History ==
The Basters, a group from South Africa, moved to the area in the 1890s.

== Geography ==
Rietoog has a very dry climate and is surrounded by mountains. Little rainfall has led to a low water supply. Most of the water is supplied from the water tank in the school playground.

Many of its residents keep domestic animals such as horses, dogs, cats, and donkeys. Local plants include the camelthorn tree. A geological feature in the area is the Rietoog Nappe which is said to be "separated from the 4 upper, allochthonous units by a major sole thrust."

== Economy, education and transport ==
Rietoog has a school and two small shops. The school, WJD Cloete Junior Secondary School, opened in 1949, and currently has about 250 learners in grades 1-10. To travel locally people ride in donkey carts, which are carts pulled by 2-4 donkeys. A minibus transports people to the nearest, larger town of Rehoboth.

Cars are used by a few residents, but there are settlements off the main road and behind the school, which are inaccessible by any form of transport. The M47 gravel road is used as a thoroughfare between Rehoboth and Naukluft.
