= Okongo =

- Village
- Location within Namibia
- Coordinates: 17°34′S 17°13′E
- Country: Namibia
- Region: Ohangwena Region
- Constituency: Okongo Constituency
- Settled: 1900s
- Declared settlement area: 1999
- Proclaimed village: 2015

Population (2023)
  - Total: 3,564
- Time zone: UTC+2 (SAST)
- Number plate: KO
- Climate: BSh

Okongo is a village in the Ohangwena Region of northern Namibia. It had a population of 3,564 people in 2023. It is the district capital of Okongo Constituency.

== History ==
Okongo was first settled by the San people in the 1900s, who, as a hunter-gatherer community, found the local abundance of wildlife and fruit attractive in the village. The name Okongo derives from the Oshiwambo word meaning: a place or a forest for hunting.

The San were eventually displaced in Okongo by the immigration of Bantu people. Today the commonly spoken language in the area is Oshiwambo and Christianity is the predominant religion.

Netumbo Nandi-Ndaitwah, the current president of Namibia, hails from Okongo.

== Geography ==
Okongo is situated about 120 kilometres (75 mi) east of Eenhana on the tarred road to Nkurenkuru.

Historical population
Year	Pop.	±% p.a.
2011	2,236	—
2023	3,564	+3.96%

== Economy and infrastructure ==
Okongo has basic amenities: electricity, water and sanitation, a post office, basic supermarkets, and clothing outlets, as well as banking facilities. Okongo District Hospital, a 62-bed public hospital that serves the surrounding settlements, is situated in the village. Despite the water in the villages, it was unable to provide free water to the residents during Covid 19.

There are two pre-primary schools, one primary school (Okongo Primary School), a combined school (Elia Weyulu Combined School) and a secondary school (Oshela Senior Secondary School). There is a NaTIS office, registering cars, drivers, and licenses, which was initiated in 2020. Okongo's number plate is KO.

There is also the Okongo Community Library, which offers educational resources, internet access and research facilities to community members.

The village is accessible via a tarred road. There is also a landing strip for small aircraft.

== Politics ==
Okongo was declared a settlement area in 1999. In 2015 its status was upgraded to a village. Since then, it is governed by a village council that has five seats.

The 2015 local authority election was won by SWAPO which gained 881 votes and all five seats. The Rally for Democracy and Progress (RDP) and the Democratic Turnhalle Alliance (DTA) also ran and gained 60 and 29 votes, respectively. SWAPO also won the 2020 local authority election. It obtained 521 votes and gained four seats. The Independent Patriots for Change (IPC), an opposition party formed in August 2020, obtained 208 votes and the remaining seat.
