= Ekuku =

Village in Namibia

Ekuku is a village located nearly 3 kilometres (1.9 mi) north of Oshakati in Okatana Constituency, Oshana Region, Namibia. The mayor of the village is Leevi Shipepe ya Shipepe, and its population is about 3,000.

The village contains two schools: a junior primary school and a senior primary school. Okatana Senior Primary School is a Catholic school established by Finnish missionaries in 1932.

The village has been identified as a suitable site for permanent relocation for three of the 10 informal settlements at the Oshakati town. About 800 households from the three informal settlements are scheduled to be relocated to higher lying areas of Ekuku because of flood damage.
