= Ondobe Yomunghudi =

Ondobe yOmunghudi
- Settlement
- Location within Namibia
- Coordinates: 17.433364°S 15.584271°E
- Country: Namibia
- Region: Ohangwena
- Time zone: UTC+2 (SAST)

Ondobe Yomunghudi is a village situated in northern Namibia in the Ohangwena Region. The village is named after tree species called Omunghudi that was in pan nearby during its discovery, an elderly revealed. Situated on the very edge of the Owambo region (sometimes called/previously the 4 O's region). The first thing that unique about this village is the abundance of people, unlike the rest of the country. People, livestock, shebeens (bars) and markets are everywhere, seemingly all existing harmoniously in unplanned order.

It is 42.4 km, 43 minutes driving north of Oshakati, approximately 36.6 km, 39 minutes driving west of Oshikango and approximately 9 km from the Angolan-Namibia border (9 minutes driving). The village falls under Oukwanyama Traditional Authority in Ohaingu section and it is part of the Ongenga constituency.

The village hosts about 1,000 inhabitants. There is one school: Okamukwa Primary School which serves most of the lower primary and junior secondary students. Entrepreneurs established businesses such as sheebens, bottle Stores and other minor developments like pounding machines. Essential services like clinic and church services ELCIN are found at Okambebe and Omungwelume a nearby 8 km Settlement.

Several houses in Ondobe Yomunghudi are electrified with NORED electricity and Namwater rural water.

This area was also affected by the South African War 1966 to 1989 between South Africa and Plan and later UNITA (with the Angolan government)

The village is surrounded by the neighboring villages of Oshali, Ohadiwa, Eengwena, Okambebe and Oshindobe.
