= Otshaandja =

Human settlement in Oshana Region, Namibia

Otshaandja is a village in Oshana Region, Namibia. It is the home village of Chief Samuel Ankama and Aram Martin, prominent politicians in SWAPO.
