= Okongo Constituency =

Electoral constituency in the Ohangwena region of northern Namibia

Coordinates: 17°34′S 17°13′E

Okongo constituency (red) in the Ohangwena Region of Namibia

Okongo is a constituency in the Ohangwena Region of Namibia, on the border with Angola. It had a population of 25,698 in 2011, up from 21,551 in 2001. In 2020, it had 12,562 registered voters.

The main settlement and district capital is Okongo. The constituency shares boundaries with Angola to the North, the Oshikoto region to the South, Kavango West on the Eastern part, and Oshikunde on the West.

The constituency originally covered an area of 4,693 km^{2} (1,812 sq mi). In August 2013, following a recommendation of the Fourth Delimitation Commission of Namibia, and in preparation for the 2014 general election, Okongo constituency lost its western part, which since then forms a constituency on its own, Oshikunde Constituency.

== Politics ==
As is common in all constituencies of former Owamboland, Namibia's ruling SWAPO Party has dominated elections since independence. In the 2004 regional election, SWAPO candidate Paulus Mwahanyekange received 6,679 of the 6,709 votes cast.

It won the 2015 regional election by a landslide. Its candidate Fanuel Ndadi gathered 5,766 votes, while the only opposition candidate, Waldeheim Kanalelo of the Rally for Democracy and Progress (RDP), received 241 votes. The 2020 regional election was also won by the SWAPO candidate. Efraim Lebeus received 5,072 votes, far ahead of Tobias Shingo of the Independent Patriots for Change (IPC), an opposition party formed in August 2020, who obtained 469 votes.
