= Langstrand =

- Holiday resort
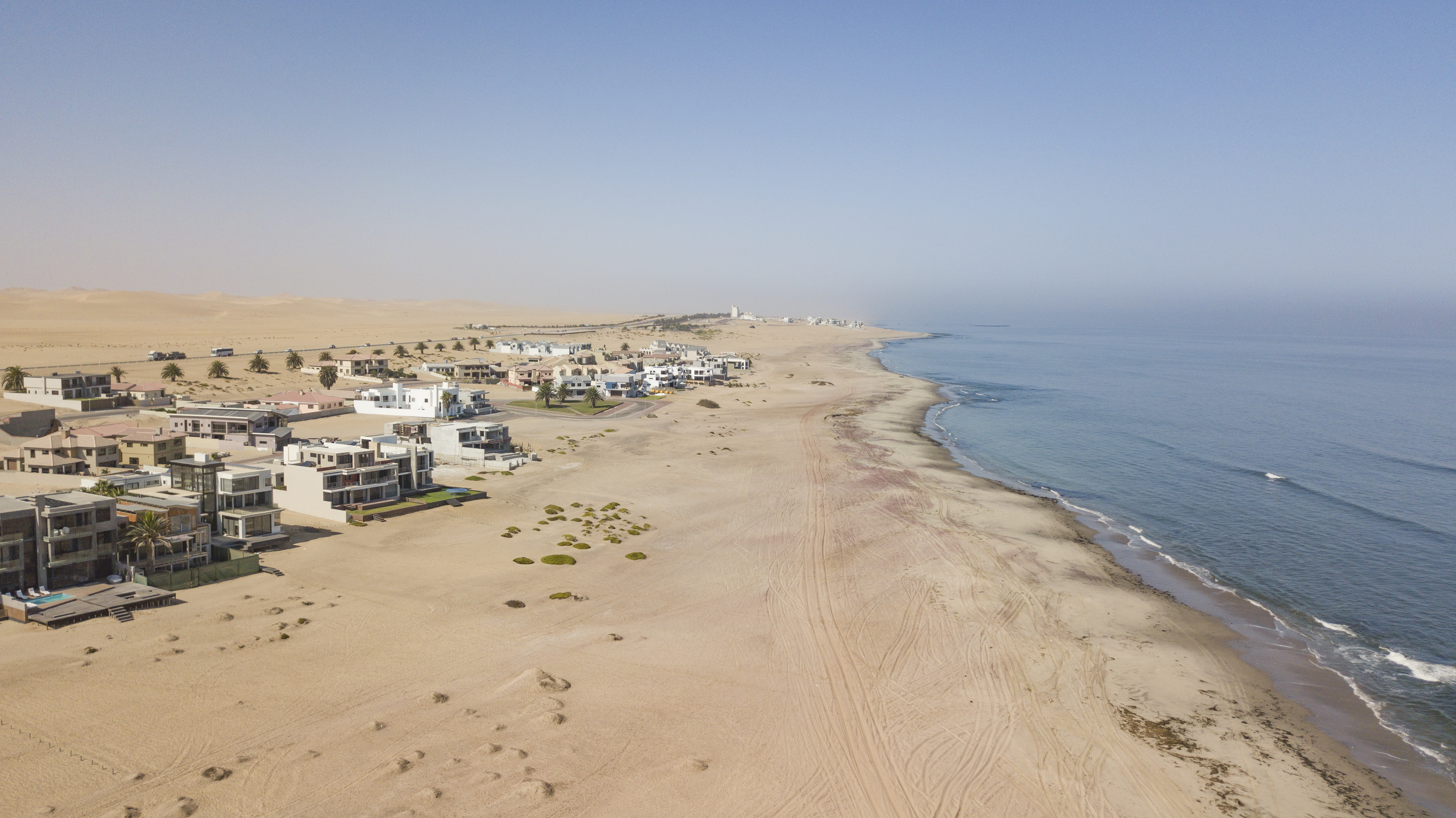
- Aerial view of Langstrand

- Location in Namibia
- Coordinates: 22°50′08″S 14°32′26″E
- Country: Namibia
- Region: Erongo Region
- Time zone: UTC+2 (South African Standard Time)

Langstrand (Afrikaans and German for "Long Beach", which the residential area is often called by English-speaking tourists) is a small beach resort on the Atlantic coast in western Namibia. Langstrand and its neighboring sister resort Dolfynstrand lie between Walvis Bay and Swakopmund on the national road B2.

The fact that these towns are sandwiched between the high sand dunes of the Namib Desert and the Atlantic Ocean makes them quite unique. Tourists are often drawn here for activities like quad biking in the dunes and paragliding, as well as sandboarding and to experience the small and great wonders of the desert and the ocean.

Langstrand is governed by the municipality of Walvis Bay. It is popular for escaping the interior summer heat in Namibia. The area came into fame in 2006 because the Burning Shore Hotel, where Angelina Jolie and Brad Pitt stayed during the end of her pregnancy with Shiloh, is located in Langstrand.

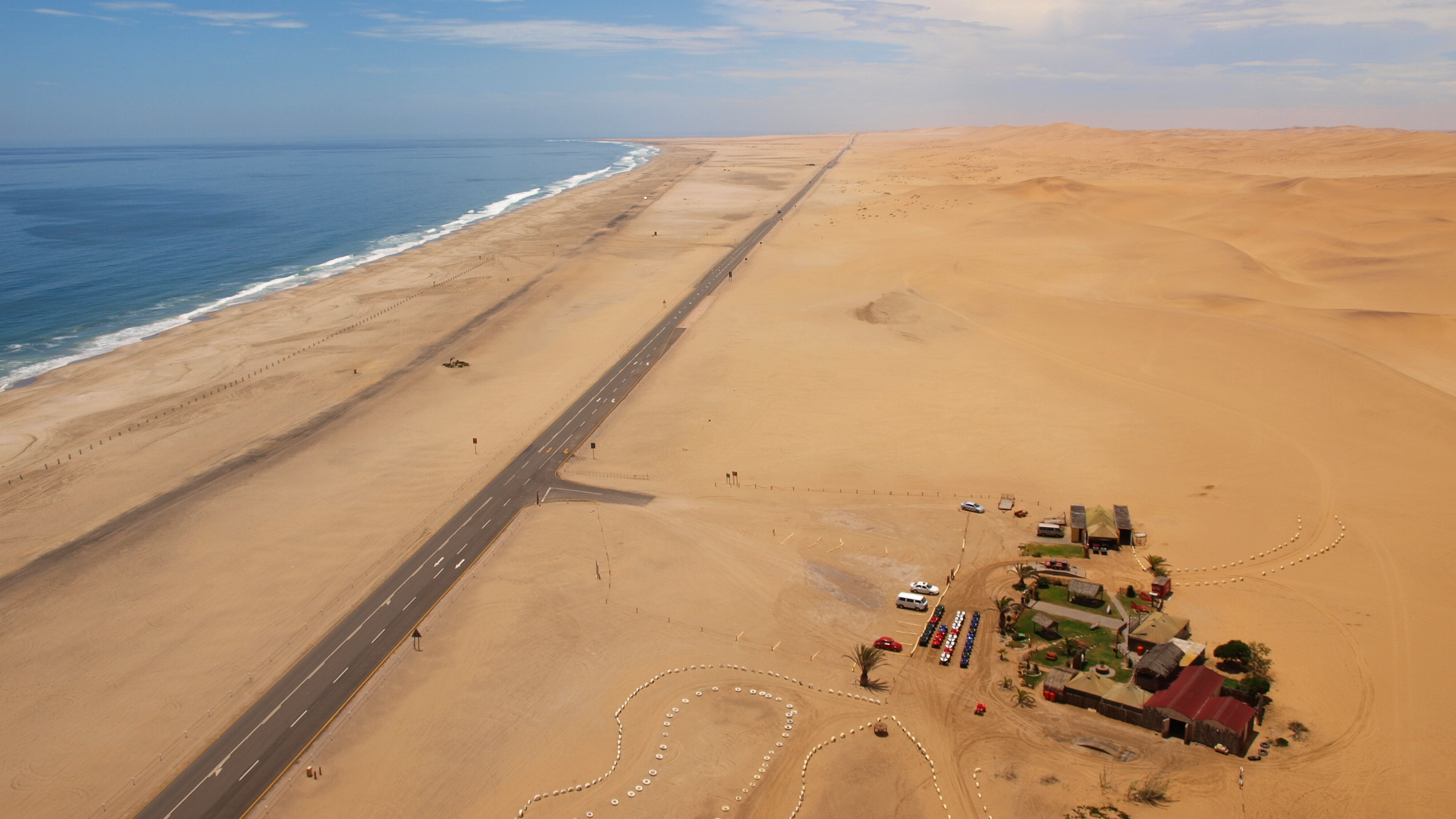
Namibia, Langstrand

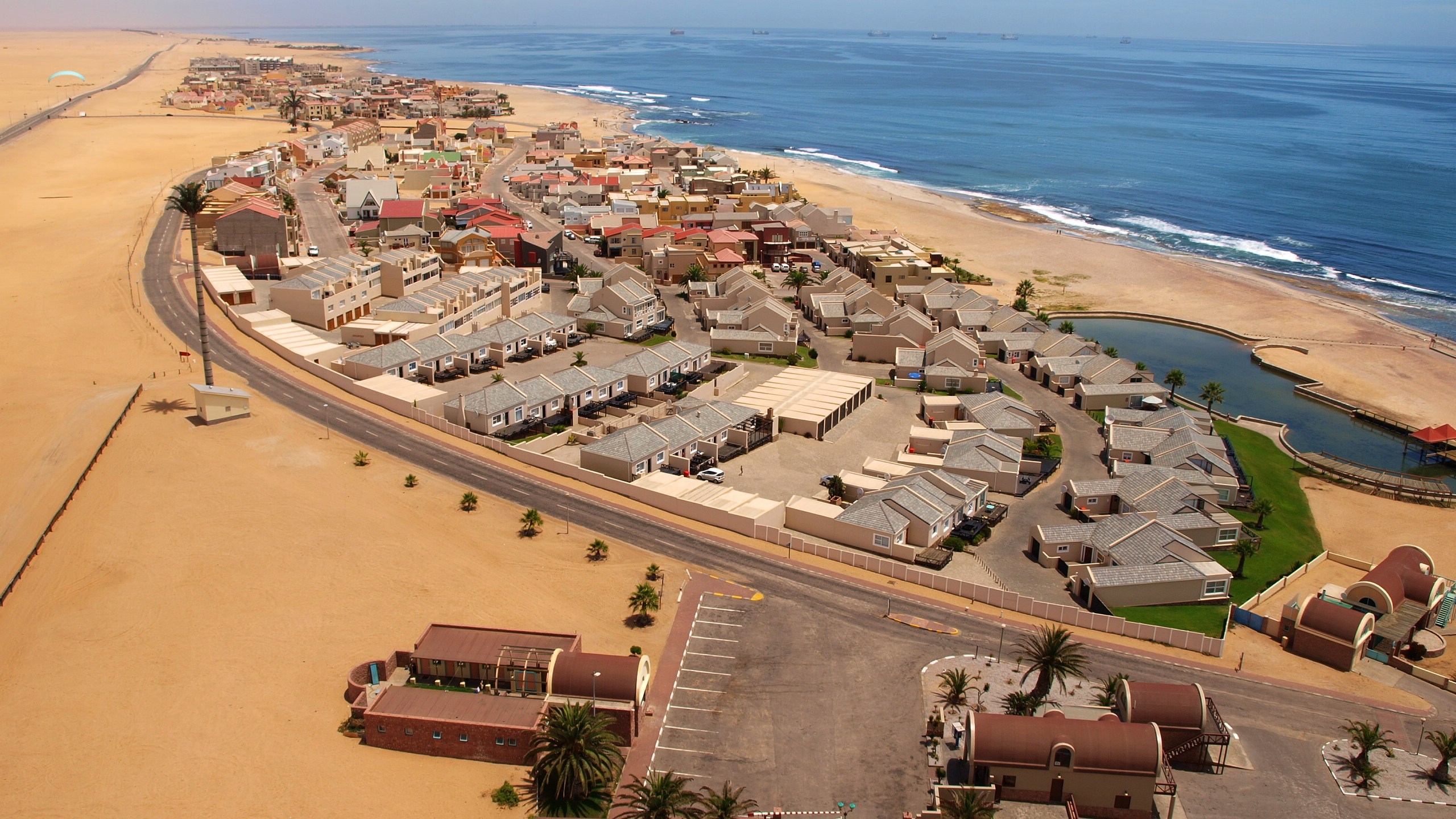
Namibia - Long Beach Leisure Park
