= Dolfynstrand =

- Holiday resort
- Location in Namibia
- Coordinates: 22°50′07″S 14°32′25″E
- Country: Namibia
- Region: Erongo Region
- Time zone: UTC+2 (South African Standard Time)

Dolfynstrand (Afrikaans for "dolphin beach") is a seaside resort on the South Atlantic coast of Namibia. The residential compound is located in the Walvis Bay constituency and just north of Langstrand, another beach resort located about 20 km north of Walvis Bay on the B2 Road towards Swakopmund. It is a popular destination for sport fishing in Namibia.

Dolfynstrand was founded in the 1970s and has only a few hundred full-time residents, but during the holiday season its population increases to thousands of visitors. The Bay View Resort in Dolfynstrand, a 4-star hotel, is a popular venue for hosting events and conferences. Dolfynstrand also boasts a small water park.
