= Grootfontein Constituency =

Electoral constituency in the Otjozondjupa region of Namibia

Coordinates: 19°34′S 18°07′E

Grootfontein constituency (red) in the Otjozondjupa Region

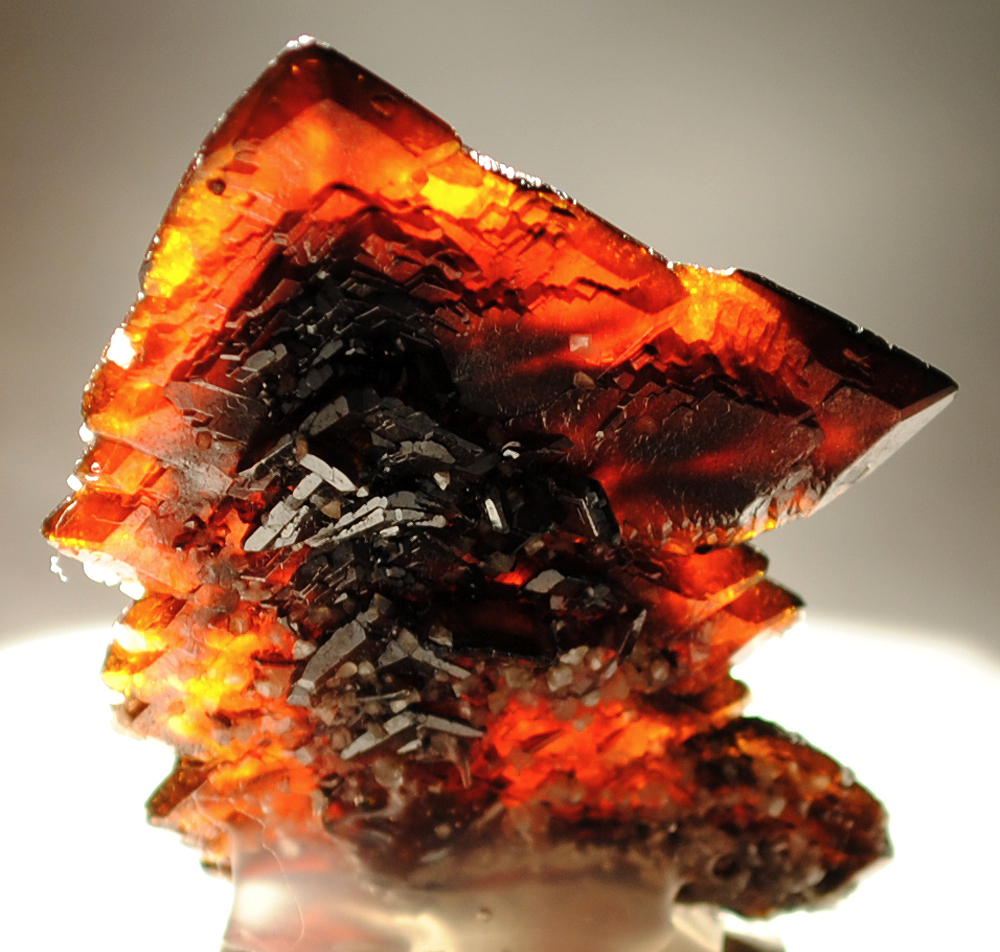
Exceptional Descloizite mineral specimen, Berg Aukas mine in the Grootfontein Constituency

Grootfontein Constituency is an electoral constituency in the Otjozondjupa Region of Namibia. It had 21,595 inhabitants in 2004 and 16,629 registered voters in 2020. The constituency consists of the town of Grootfontein and the surrounding rural area. Until 1998 it also contained the area that today is Tsumkwe Constituency. It was split off following a recommendation of the Second Delimitation Commission of Namibia, and in preparation of the 1998 general election.

== Politics ==
Grootfontein is traditionally a stronghold of the South West Africa People's Organization (SWAPO) party. In the 2004 regional election, SWAPO candidate Peter Kanana received 4,664 of the 6,140 votes cast and became councillor.

The 2015 regional election was won by Nelao Delemine Amagulu of SWAPO with 3,521 votes, followed by Paulus Bernardt Wimmerth of the Democratic Turnhalle Alliance (DTA) with 1,149 votes and Wendelinus Kweruje Limbu of the All People’s Party (APP) with 267 votes. The SWAPO candidate also won the 2020 regional election. Elder Fernando Filipe received 2,829 votes, while Matias Joseph of the Independent Patriots for Change (IPC), a party formed in August 2020, obtained 1,044 votes. Wimmerth of the Popular Democratic Movement (PDM, the new name of the DTA) came third with 790 votes.
