= Shebeen =

Bar or pub, originally unlicensed

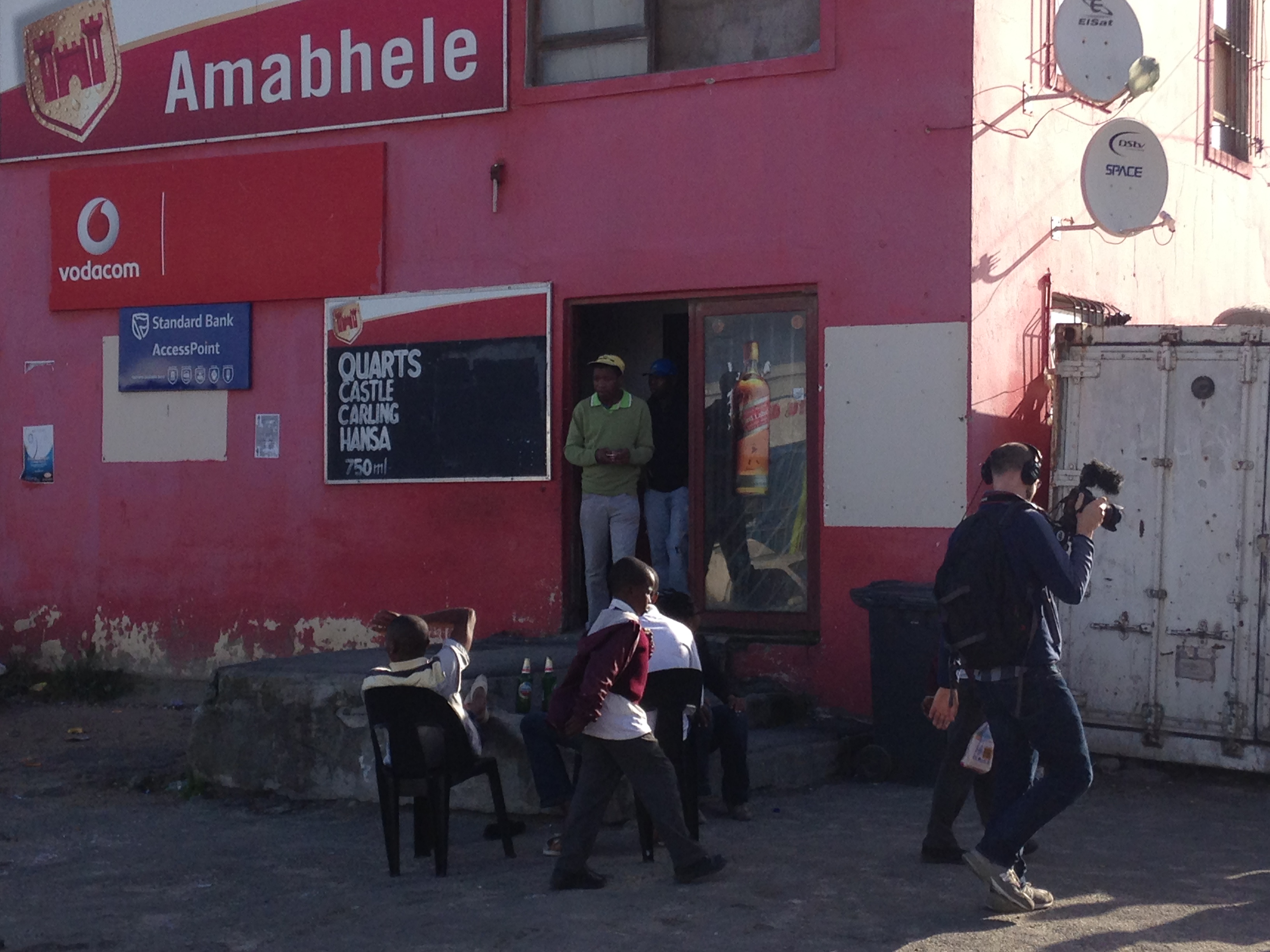
Shebeen in Joe Slovo Park, Cape Town

A shebeen (Irish: síbín, "home-made whiskey") was originally an illicit bar or club where accessible alcoholic beverages were sold without a licence. The term has spread far from its origins in Ireland, and is particularly common in South Africa. It has also been used in Canada, the United States, the United Kingdom, Zambia, Namibia, Malawi, Zimbabwe, and the English-speaking Caribbean, including Jamaica. In modern South Africa, many shebeens are now fully legal.

== Ireland ==
The word shebeen derives from the Irish síbín, meaning 'illicit whiskey' and was first used as far back as the late 1700s. Shebeens began popping up around Ireland during the COVID-19 pandemic due to hospitality shutdowns and social distancing. Gardaí subsequently began conducting searches and raids to shut them down in late 2020.

== South Africa ==
Originally shebeens were operated illegally by women who were called Shebeen Queens and were themselves a revival of the African tradition that assigned the role of women in brewing. The Shebeen Queens would sell homebrewed and home-distilled alcohol and provided patrons with a place to meet and discuss political and social issues. Often, patrons and owners were arrested by the police, though the shebeens were frequently reopened because of their importance in unifying the community and providing a safe place for discussion. During the apartheid era, shebeens became a crucial meeting place for activists, some attracting working-class activists and community members, while others attracted lawyers, doctors and musicians.

Shebeens also provided music and dancing, allowing patrons to express themselves culturally, which helped give rise to and support the musical genre kwaito. Currently, shebeens are legal in South Africa and have become an integral part of South African urban culture, serving diverse commercial beer, cider and whisky brands, as well as umqombothi, a traditional African beer made from maize and sorghum. Shebeens still form an important part of today's social scene. In contemporary South Africa, they serve a function similar to juke joints for African Americans in the rural Deep South of the US. They represent a sense of community, identity, and belonging.

Today, most alcoholic beverages' target market is the affluent black African class (particularly male), whose persona is perceived to be educated, tied to the high end job market and a step up in the social ladder. As well as appealing to South Africa's youth, most shebeens are owned by black men. Shebeens are bouncing back as South Africans try to aspire to better economic conditions in order to preserve some of their cultural and economic affairs.

== United States ==
In the United States, the word shebeen saw general use by Irish immigrants who worked in the anthracite patches of Pennsylvania.

== Newfoundland ==
Like many traditional Irish words, shebeen has persisted in Newfoundland, Canada. The Dictionary of Newfoundland English defines shebeen, also sheebeen and sheveen, as an "unlicensed place where illicit liquor is sold." In the 1880s, the proliferation of shebeens was a hot topic, pitting temperance advocates against those who considered the shebeens harmless fun.

On 5 January 1888, the Twillingate Sun reported: "A policeman entered a shebeen and found a number of persons drinking. A panic ensued, and there was a general stampede. The transgressor of the law, on being brought before the magistrate, pleaded that he was merely entertaining a few friends. The Judge duly remarked he thought it a strange way to entertain friends, when the said friends tried to hide themselves and their drinking utensils away, on the approach of a constable."

In April 1898, the Chief Steward of the S.S. Bruce raged in response to a St. John's Evening Telegram story querying whether his ship was "a floating shebeen".

== See also ==
- Bothy
- Cuca shop – a similar establishment in Namibia
- List of public house topics
- Speakeasy
- Sly-grog shop (or shanty)
- Tea house
- Third place
