= Hai Ti! =

Hai Ti! was a comic strip that spread the word about the ways that computers and the Internet can transform learners' and teachers' lives. It was created by SchoolNet Namibia. It was unique in being the first publication of its kind to be published under international Creative Commons rules in Namibia. The strip won third place at the World Summit Awards in 2005.

The comic ceased publication in 2009 after SchoolNet fell out of favour with the Namibian government.
