= Grootfontein =

City in the Otjozondjupa Region of central Namibia

Grootfontein Otjiherero: Otjivanda
- City
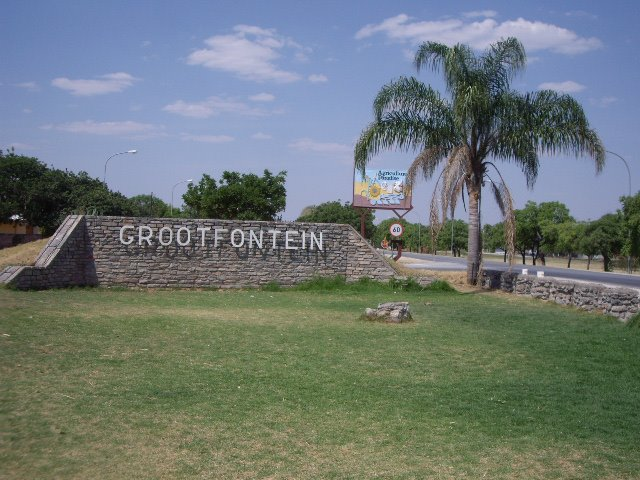

- Coat of arms
- Motto: Fons Vitæ
- Location in Namibia
- Coordinates: 19°34′22″S 18°06′26″E
- Country: Namibia
- Region: Otjozondjupa Region
- Constituency: Grootfontein constituency
- Established: 1885

Government
  - Mayor: Haimene

Area
  - Total: 23.8 sq mi (61.7 km^{2})
- Elevation: 4,728 ft (1,441 m)

Population (2023)
  - Total: 26,839
  - Density: 1,130/sq mi (435/km^{2})
- Time zone: UTC+02:00 (CAT)
- Area code: 067
- Climate: BSh
- Website: http://www.grootfonteinmun.com.na/

Grootfontein (lit. 'large fountain') is a city with 26,839 inhabitants in the Otjozondjupa Region of central Namibia. It is one of the three towns in the Otavi Triangle, situated on the B8 national road that leads from Otavi to the Caprivi Strip.

== History ==
The place was known to the Herero under the name Otjivanda. In 1885, 40 Boer families from the north-west of South Africa settled at Grootfontein. Part of the Dorsland trekkers, they were heading towards Angola. When that territory fell under Portuguese control, they turned back and established the Republic of Upingtonia at Grootfontein. Abandoned by 1887, it became the headquarters of the South West Africa Company in 1893.

In 1908, the Roman Catholic Church established a mission in Grootfontein as the basis of their eventually successful attempt to establish missions in Kavango.

Historical population
| Year | Pop. | ±% p.a. |
|---|---|---|
| 2001 | 14,249 | — |
| 2011 | 16,632 | +1.56% |
| 2023 | 26,839 | +4.07% |

== Economy and infrastructure ==
The economic mainspring of the area were for many decades the Berg Aukas and Abenab mines to the north east of the town. These produced zinc and vanadium but have since closed.

=== Transport ===
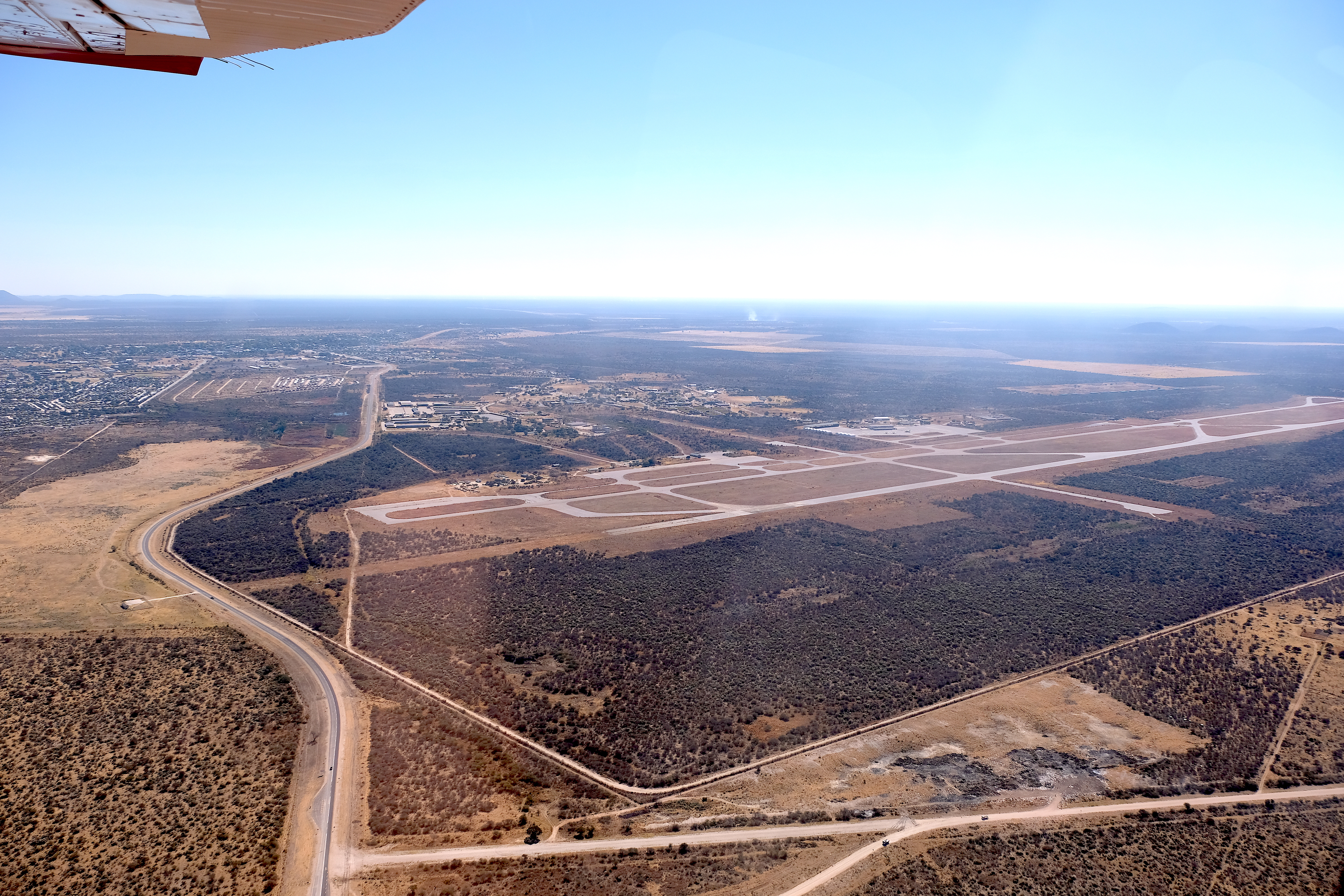
Military Airport and the town beyond

Grootfontein is a railhead on TransNamib, the national railway and transport system. The next station to the west is Otavi. Grootfontein is also home of Namibia's main military base which housed several units of the now departed South African Defence Force.

It has an airfield that can handle large transport carriers such as the Hercules C130, as well as commercial passenger aircraft.

=== Agriculture ===
The Grootfontein Show, an annual agricultural exhibition that has taken place since 1911, is the second largest annual entrepreneurial exhibition in the country, after the Windhoek Show.

== Geography ==
Like all the towns in the Otavi Triangle, Grootfontein is green in summer but drier in winter. In spring, jacaranda and flamboyant trees bloom in profusion. The town has an old German Schutztruppe fortress from the year 1896, which today houses a museum that expounds on the local history. Namibia is a dolomite country and the carbonate deposits in the upper parts of the mine have yielded interesting fossils of simian or pongoid creatures that lived millions of years before modern humans evolved.

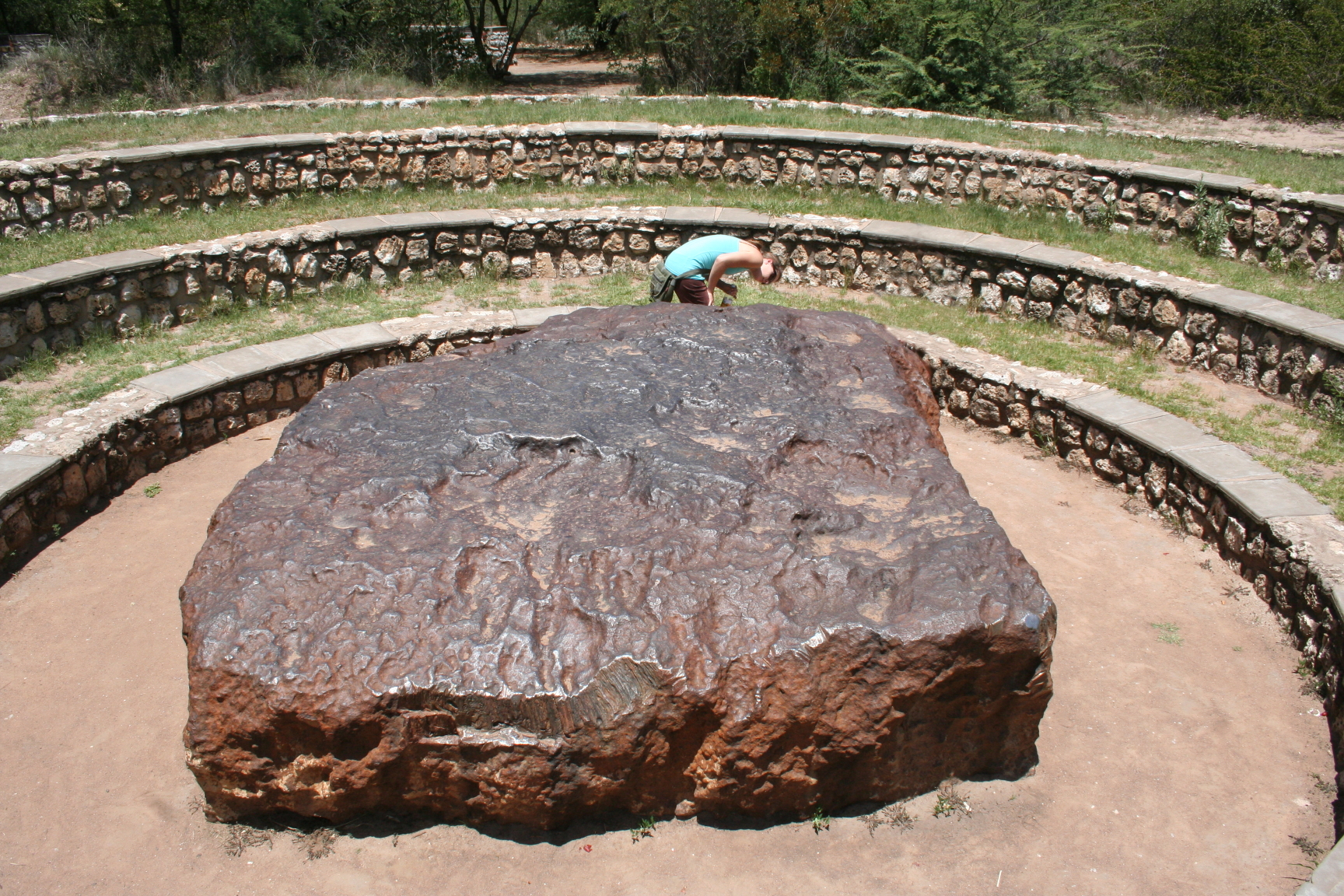
Hoba Meteorite 2007

Twenty-four kilometres west of Grootfontein lies the huge Hoba meteorite. At more than 60 tons, it is the largest known meteorite on Earth, as well as the largest naturally occurring mass of iron known to exist on the planet's surface.

=== Climate ===
Grootfontein receives an annual average rainfall of 557 millimetres (21.9 in), with a high of 956 mm (37.6 in) in the 2010/2011 rainy season, and a low of 230 mm (9.1 in) during the 2010s drought in 2018/19.

The town has a hot semi arid climate (Koppen:BSh).

Climate data for Grootfontein, Namibia
| Month | Jan | Feb | Mar | Apr | May | Jun | Jul | Aug | Sep | Oct | Nov | Dec | Year |
|---|---|---|---|---|---|---|---|---|---|---|---|---|---|
| Mean daily maximum °C (°F) | 30.9 (87.6) | 29.8 (85.6) | 29.4 (84.9) | 28.5 (83.3) | 26.5 (79.7) | 24.0 (75.2) | 23.8 (74.8) | 26.8 (80.2) | 30.6 (87.1) | 32.1 (89.8) | 31.9 (89.4) | 31.3 (88.3) | 28.8 (83.8) |
| Mean daily minimum °C (°F) | 18.5 (65.3) | 18.0 (64.4) | 17.1 (62.8) | 14.4 (57.9) | 10.4 (50.7) | 7.1 (44.8) | 6.8 (44.2) | 9.6 (49.3) | 13.8 (56.8) | 16.9 (62.4) | 18.0 (64.4) | 18.4 (65.1) | 14.1 (57.4) |
| Average precipitation mm (inches) | 141.7 (5.58) | 127.0 (5.00) | 99.6 (3.92) | 30.1 (1.19) | 4.3 (0.17) | 0.4 (0.02) | 0 (0) | 1.3 (0.05) | 4.9 (0.19) | 21.5 (0.85) | 51.6 (2.03) | 70.7 (2.78) | 553.1 (21.78) |
| Average relative humidity (%) | 58 | 66 | 66 | 70 | 51 | 48 | 43 | 34 | 28 | 33 | 42 | 46 | 49 |
Source: Ministry of Works and Transport (Meteorological Service Division) "Ministry of Works & Transport: Tabulation of Climate Statistics for Selected Stations in Namibia" (PDF). 2012.

== Politics ==
Grootfontein is governed by a municipal council that has seven seats.

The first local election run after independence of Namibia, the 1992 local elections, was won by SWAPO which obtained 2,732 votes and gained five seats. The Democratic Turnhalle Alliance (DTA) came second with 1,392 votes and two seats. The 1998 local authority elections saw a similar result, albeit with a much lower voter turnout. SWAPO obtained five seats with 870 votes, and the DTA got two seats with 389 votes.

The 2015 local authority election was won by SWAPO which gained five seats and 2,019 votes. One seat each went to the DTA (546 votes) and to the All People's Party (APP, 154 votes). SWAPO also won the 2020 local authority election, obtaining 1,727 votes and gaining four seats. The Independent Patriots for Change (IPC), an opposition party formed in August 2020, obtained 653 votes and gained two seats. The remaining seat went to the Popular Democratic Movement (PDM, the new name of the DTA) with 309 votes.

== Education ==
Previously, the German school Regierungsschule Grootfontein had been in Grootfontein. In 1965, it had four teachers and 117 learners and was supported by the German government.

Nowadays, Grootfontein is home to four high schools, Grootfontein Secondary School, Otjiwanda High School Friedrich Awaseb Senior Secondary School, and a private school named Karstveld Academy. Further the primary schools Luiperdheuwel, Kalenga, Makalani, Omulunga and Wilhelm Nortier are located here. The city also hosts a private German medium primary school (Deutsche Privatschule Grootfontein – DPG).

== Notable people ==
- Behati Prinsloo – model, best known for working with Victoria's Secret and wife of the band Maroon 5's lead vocalist, Adam Levine
- Leon Jooste – SWAPO politician and businessman
- Hage Geingob – former president of the Republic of Namibia
- Lydia Katjita – SWAPO politician and member of the Pan-African Parliament
- Hannes Smith – journalist
- Inge Zaamwani – businesswoman
