= Etomba =

- Settlement
- Location within Namibia
- Coordinates: 17°26′S 16°04′E
- Country: Namibia
- Region: Ohangwena Region
- Time zone: UTC+2 (SAST)

Etomba is a settlement in Ohangwena Region, Namibia. It is 25 km (16 mi) from Ondobe and 37 km (23 mi) away from Eenhana. It is the largest village in the area. Its full name is Etomba laNghifesho, which differentiates it from two other villages known as Etomba.

The educational institution in this rural area is known as Etomba Combined School, which provides education from grades 1 to 10. The village itself comprises 150 households, with an average of approximately 6 individuals living in each household.

The village has a reliable source of clean drinking water facilitated by a rural water supply pipeline, which supplies water through communal taps. Some households also have individual water taps and access to underground water for their livestock.

For healthcare services, residents rely on the Hamukoto Wakapa clinic, located in the nearby Onamunama village, approximately 4 kilometers (2.5 miles) away.

Some of the notable people that were born at Etomba includes Nangula Nelulu Uaandja. In 2016, a gruesome incident happened in Etomba which resulted in the woman death due to fear of rituals.
