= Dr Abraham Iyambo Senior Secondary School =

School in northern Namibia

Information
- Former name: Oshikunde Senior Secondary School (until 2014)
- Grades: 11-12
- Enrollment: 404 (2014)

Dr Abraham Iyambo Senior Secondary School is a school in the Ohangwena Region of northern Namibia, situated c. 35 kilometres (22 mi) east of Eenhana. The school's original name was Oshikunde Senior Secondary School after the Oshikunde Constituency in which it is situated. After a major renovation in September 2014, it was renamed after the former Minister of Higher Education Abraham Iyambo. Dr Abraham Iyambo SSS is a government boarding school catering for grades 11 and 12. In 2014 it had 404 learners.

== See also ==
- Education in Namibia
- List of schools in Namibia
