= Tondoro =

- Settlement
- Location within Namibia
- Coordinates: 17°46′05″S 18°47′23″E
- Country: Namibia
- Region: Kavango West
- Constituency: Tondoro Constituency
- Time zone: UTC+2 (SAST)
- Climate: BSh

Tondoro is a small town in the Kavango West region of northern Namibia, and the administrative centre of the Tondoro Constituency. It is located 15 kilometres (9.3 mi) south-east of Nkurenkuru, and it is inhabited primarily by the Uukwangali people.

There is a Catholic mission in the town, called the St. Laurence Mission. It was founded in 1927 by Father Weilhöfer of the Missionary Oblates of Mary Immaculate and it is still staffed by them.

The staff of the mission consists of five sisters of the Order of Saint Benedict of Tutzing, and they staff a girl's hostel and a clinic. The Mission serves 35 communities spread along the Kavango River. They use two deacons to assist them in serving this vast number of people. The Deacons are Dc. Moses Kandjimi Murangi, and Dc. Erwin Masambo Musunga.

The outstation communities are: Canchana, Desi, Ekuli, Gcarhuwa, Kahenge, Kukuwa, Kamupupu, Kaparara, Katara, Katope Island, K.M. Sekondere, Makambu, Matava, Mbambamusi, Mbome, Mburu-uru, Mpengu, Mukekete, Musese, Nambi, Namutuntu, Nepara, Ngandu, Nkurenkuru, Nzinze, Simanya, Sitopogo, Tjara, Tuguva, Yinsu.
