= Olupandu =

- Location within Namibia
- Coordinates: 17°34′S 15°35′E
- Country: Namibia
- Region: Omusati
- Constituency: Etayi
- Time zone: UTC+2 (SAST)

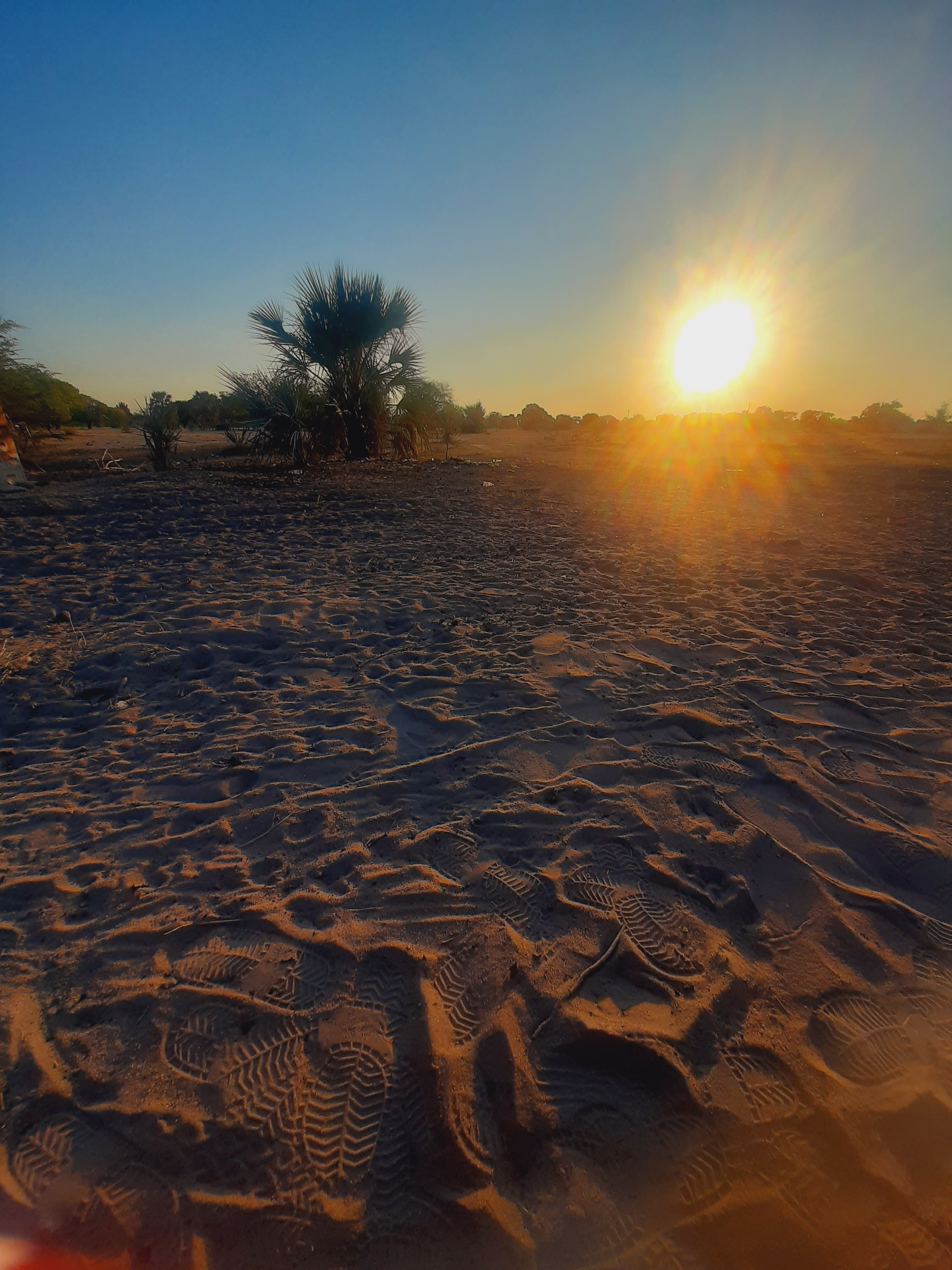
Sunset at Olupandu village

Olupandu is a village situated at the southern side of northern Namibia, in the Etayi Constituency of the Omusati Region. It is 200 kilometres (120 mi) from the border between Angola and Namibia. According to the 2001 census, it has a population of 50,000 people, and it covers up to 55 square kilometres (21 sq mi).

Olupandu features a secondary school, Onyika Junior Secondary School, and a hospital, Olupandu clinic. Olupandu is home to Olupandu primary school, Olupandu clinic and Olupandu Elcin Church. Its neighbouring villages are Ohembe, Okamwandi and Omafa.
