= Drimiopsis, Namibia =

Coordinates: 22°05′S 19°03′E

Drimiopsis is a village in the Omaheke Region in Namibia, about 40 km north of Gobabis. The local population includes mainly San, Khoekhoe-speakers, Herero, and Tswana.

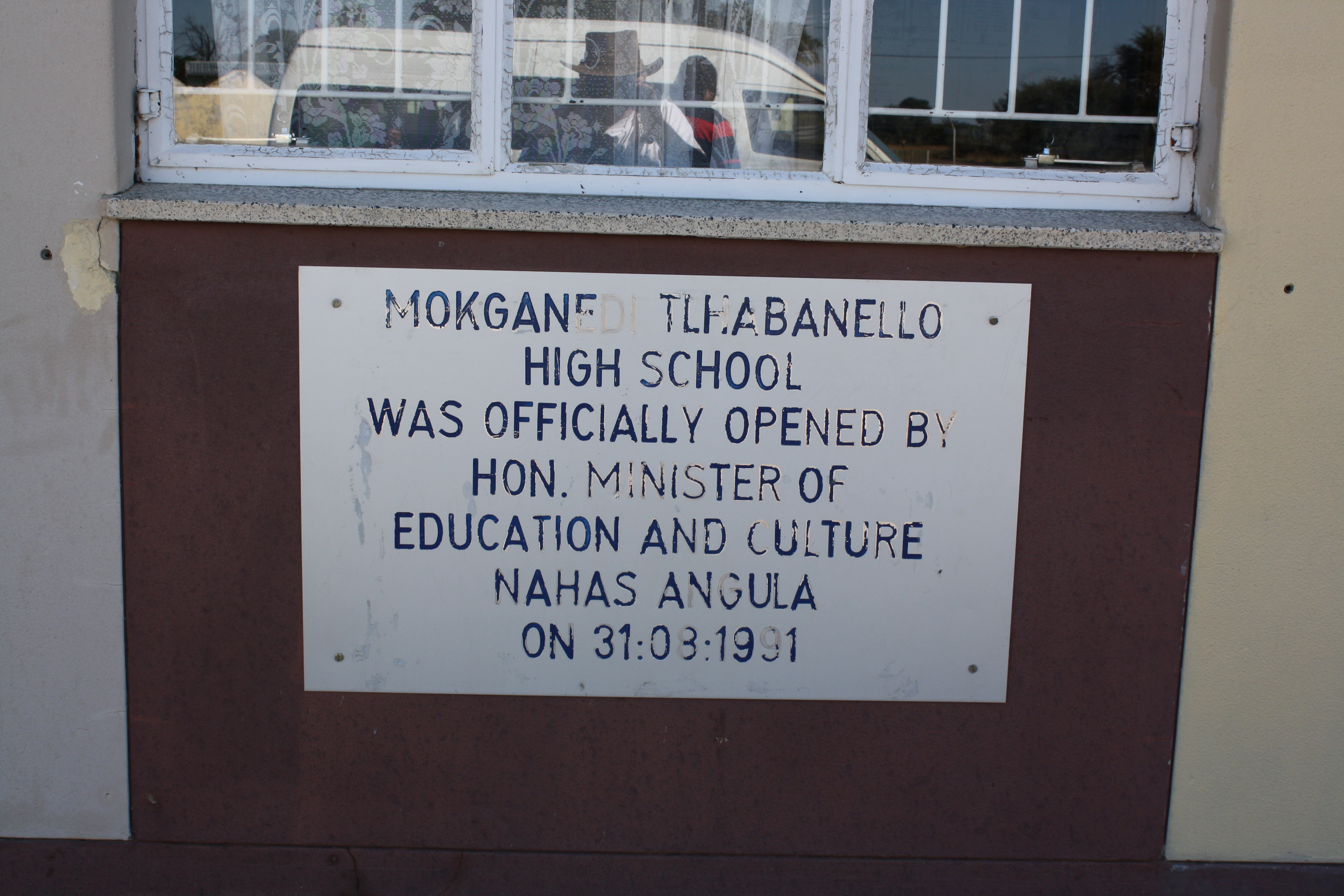
Memorial plaque at the local high school

The town features two schools, Drimiopsis Primary School and Mokganedi Tlhabanello High School, serving 489 and 590 pupils respectively in 2008. In 2012, the high school had 453 students.

Drimiopsis lies on the C22 regional road which runs from Aranos through Gobabis south to Otjiwarongo, where it ends at the intersection with the B1 road.
