= Klein Aub =

Village in the Hardap Region of central Namibia

Klein Aub is a village in the Rehoboth Rural constituency in the Hardap Region of central Namibia. Situated on the junction of the unpaved roads M47 and D1290 it contains a store and two schools.

Klein Aub used to be the place of a copper mine from 1964 to 1987, also gold and silver have been found in the area. In early 2010 one of the mining tunnels collapsed, leaving a 50m deep hole.

== Climate ==
Climate data for Klein Aub
Month	Jan	Feb	Mar	Apr	May	Jun	Jul	Aug	Sep	Oct	Nov	Dec	Year
Mean daily maximum °C (°F)	30 (86)	29 (84)	27 (80)	25 (77)	23 (73)	20 (68)	21 (69)	23 (73)	27 (80)	29 (84)	30 (86)	31 (87)	26 (78)
Mean daily minimum °C (°F)	17 (62)	16 (60)	15 (59)	12 (53)	9 (48)	6 (42)	6 (42)	9 (48)	12 (53)	14 (57)	16 (60)	17 (62)	12 (53)
Average precipitation mm (inches)	79 (3.1)	79 (3.1)	79 (3.1)	38 (1.5)	7.6 (0.3)	0 (0)	0 (0)	0 (0)	2.5 (0.1)	13 (0.5)	28 (1.1)	41 (1.6)	360 (14.3)
Source: Weatherbase
