= King Kauluma Village =

- Location within Namibia
- Coordinates: 18°29′S 17°03′E
- Country: Namibia
- Time zone: UTC+2 (SAST)

King Kauluma Village is a village situated in the Oshikoto Region in the northern part of Namibia with a population of about 4800 residents. King Kauluma is located about 12 km from Oshivelo (Onamutoni). King Kauluma village is sandy and forested. All residents are Oshiwambo speaking.

== History ==
King Kauluma village was established in 1990 shortly after the Namibian independence. Most of the first residents were returnees. The returnees were initially based at the former army base used by the South African Soldiers. Due to unemployment, the returnees were assisted with small projects to help themselves such as a bakery and agriculture (Field Crops) which did not last very long. The King of Ondonga, King Immanuel Kauluma then decided to give them land to farm. The village was then named after the king.

Initially, King Kauluma was one big village with a surface area of 84 km² (32.4 mi²). Between 2016 and 2019 the village was sub-divided into several smaller villages. They were named King Kauluma A, B, C, D, E and F each with its own headman or headwoman.

== Education ==
Most of the residents are not educated as they were PLAN fighters and did not get access to education. Currently there are two schools. One of the schools is in King Kauluma A while the other is in King Kauluma F. School children still walk vast distances (in excess of 5 km one way) to reach either school.

== Health services ==
There is not a health clinic at King Kauluma village but residents get medical assistance at the nearest clinic in Oshivelo.

== Development ==
An agricultural extension office is operational providing extension work and advisory services. Services range from information sharing, seed distribution, project site visits, coaching, etc.

No pipelines pass by or close to the village meaning there is a need of clean water in these villages. Currently there are some but boreholes. The government of Namibia has started with plans to extend a pipeline from Omutsegonime to King Kauluma. In 2022 some field work was started to conduct surveys of household units, inhabitants, livestock and horticultural activities in the area to serve as input into the project.
