= Vyf Rand =

- Location within Namibia
- Coordinates: 22°00′S 16°55′E
- Country: Namibia
- Time zone: UTC+2 (SAST)

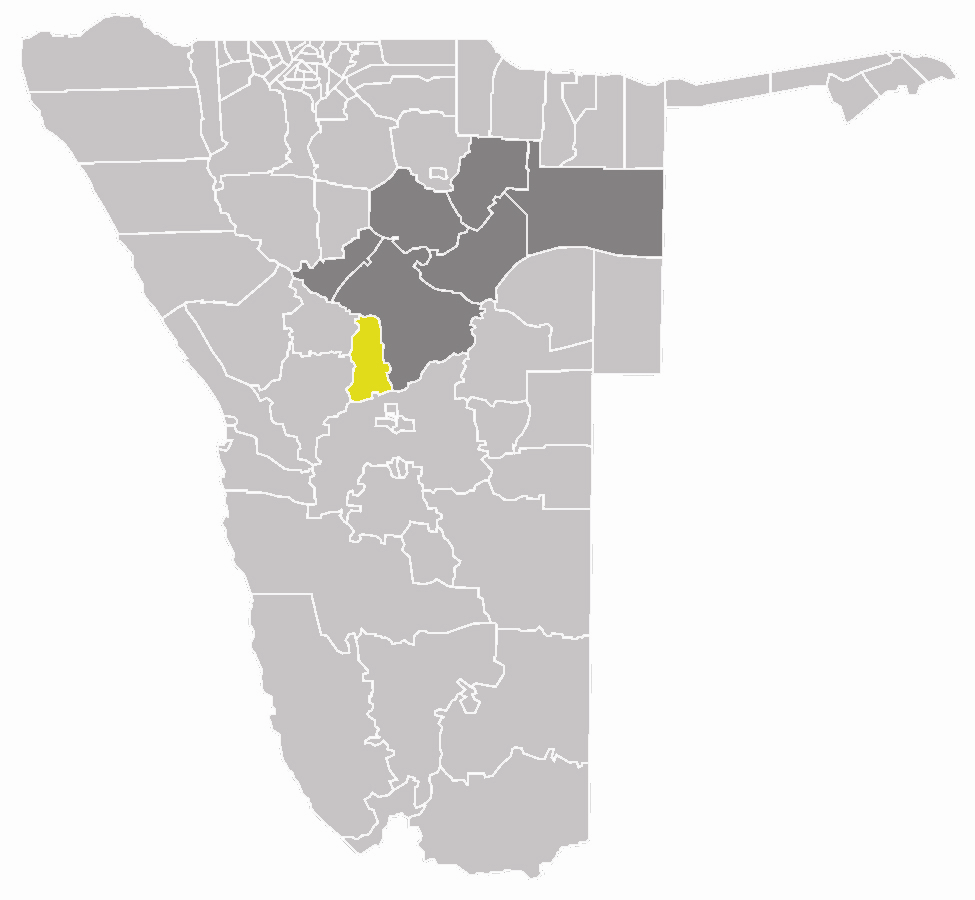
Okahandja constituency in Namibia, highlighted in yellow

Vyf Rand is an informal settlement outside of Okahandja, located north of Windhoek in the Okahandja constituency of the Otjozondjupa region of Namibia. "Vyf rand" is an Afrikaans phrase that translates to "five rand". The name originates from the initial rental fee of five rand per month tenant farmers paid for a small plot of land on large farms in Namibia.

Home of one of the poorest communities in Namibia, Vyf Rand camp has been the focus of various social projects: a primary school, a soup kitchen, and HIV/AIDS awareness programs.

The settlement was a filming location for Where Others Wavered, a film about the life of Sam Nujoma – Namibia's first president – touted as "one of the country's most ambitious film projects".

== See also ==
- List of cities and towns in Namibia
- Squatting
