= Omatjette =

- Settlement
- Location in Namibia
- Coordinates: 21°3′S 15°30′E
- Country: Namibia
- Region: Erongo Region
- Constituency: Dâures Constituency

Population
  - Total: 12,000
- Time zone: UTC+1 (South African Standard Time)

Omatjette (also: Omatjete) is a village in the Erongo Region of Namibia, situated on the road D2344 from Omaruru to Khorixas. It belongs to the Dâures electoral constituency but there are plans to split from it to become a constituency on its own. Omatjette has approximately 12,000 residents, many of them living there only temporarily.

The village name was originally Omatjate (Otjiherero: tasty water), referring to a fountain that today is on the western edge of the settlement. The water-related name of the settlement and surrounding geographical features stems from the scarcity and value of water in this semi-arid terrain; the Omatjette area only receives about 400mm of annual rain. The village is not connected to Namibia's water network.
