= Onawa, Namibia =

Onawa
- Village
- Country: Namibia
- Region: Omusati
- Time zone: UTC+2 (SAST)

Onawa is a small settlement in the north of Namibia in the Omusati Region near the border with Angola. Its neighboring villages are Olukekete, Oluvango, Ouhwaala, and Oshiputu.

== Economy ==
This village can support very few livestock like cattle, goats, sheep and donkeys due to its limited grazing and browsing capacity. The reason capacity is limited is the increasing population, the need for houses and land reclamation. Residents of this village rely on cultivated crops for their survival, mainly mahangu. Beans, maize, sorghum, watermelon and nuts are also grown.

== Geography ==
Onawa is situated within a forested area with Mopane as the dominating tree. Mopane trees are used to construct houses and fencing. These trees are also used to create storage receptacles such as baskets. Many other trees, such as Camelthorn, Makalani palms. Acacias, are present.

=== Weather ===
Normally the village is very hot during the months of end-August to December and becomes cold in the months of April to July

Onawa is vulnerable to annual floods due to heavy rains. These floods caused damage, especially from 2008 to 2012.
