= SchoolNet Namibia =

- Founded: 2000
- Founder: Joris Komen
- Dissolved: 2009
- Type: Not for gain
- Purpose: FLOSS in Education
- Location: Windhoek, Namibia
- Region served: Namibia
- Method: Hands on deployment, experience-based advocacy, affordable internet
- Key people: Joris Komen
- Website: The Case of SchoolNet Namibia (free software case study) previously schoolnet.edunet-namibia.org/ schoolnet.edunet-namibia.org (and previously schoolnet.na)]

SchoolNet Namibia was a non-profit provider of Internet service, hardware and training to Namibia's schools.

From February 2000, close to 450 schools received free hardware, free training on the OpenLab and Edubuntu operating systems and subsidised Internet connectivity, as part of the plan to empower youth through Internet access.

It published the Creative Commons-licensed comic, Hai Ti!.

In 2009, SchoolNet fell out of favour with the Namibian government and was dissolved by its trustees and membership on 17 July 2009.

As of July 2012, the original domain of SchoolNet Namibia was discontinued. An archive of the SchoolNet Namibia website could be found at http://schoolnet.edunet-namibia.org/ until the death of Gerard Jensen in December 2014; the SchoolNet story is covered by http://wikieducator.org/The_Case_of_SchoolNet_Namibia The Case of SchoolNet Namibia] (free software case study)
