= Okamule =

Village in Oshana, Namibia

Coordinates: 17°51′S 15°39′E

Okamule is a village in Oshakati West constituency, in the Oshana region of northern Namibia. It was named after the death of the comrade Mr Kamule, a long time ago. Its headman is Mr Abner Shilenga. It is located in the remote areas and it is approximately 20 km north of Oshakati. There are many houses, and about 45% of the houses are built up with sticks and mahangu straws.

The population of the village is about 1500 people. The residents survive by growing crops especially mahangu and sorghum, and by utilising domestic animals such as cattle, goats, sheep and donkeys that they use to plough their fields. They mostly depend on rainfall and during the rainy season they go to oshanas and pans for fishing. They dig wells and store the rain water in them and mostly use them in the spring season whereby the oshanas and pans are dry, for drinking by their animals.

The village was electrified in 2008.
