= Okanghudi =

Coordinates: 17.432°S 16.144°E

Okanghudi is a small settlement in the Ohangwena Region in Namibia, which is noted for being the birthplace of Namibian former president Hifikepunye Pohamba. The village has one school which comprises grades 1 to 10. The economy is based on substance farming.
