= Windhoek Show =

Annual trade fair in Windhoek, Namibia

Coordinates: 22°34′57″S 17°05′22″E

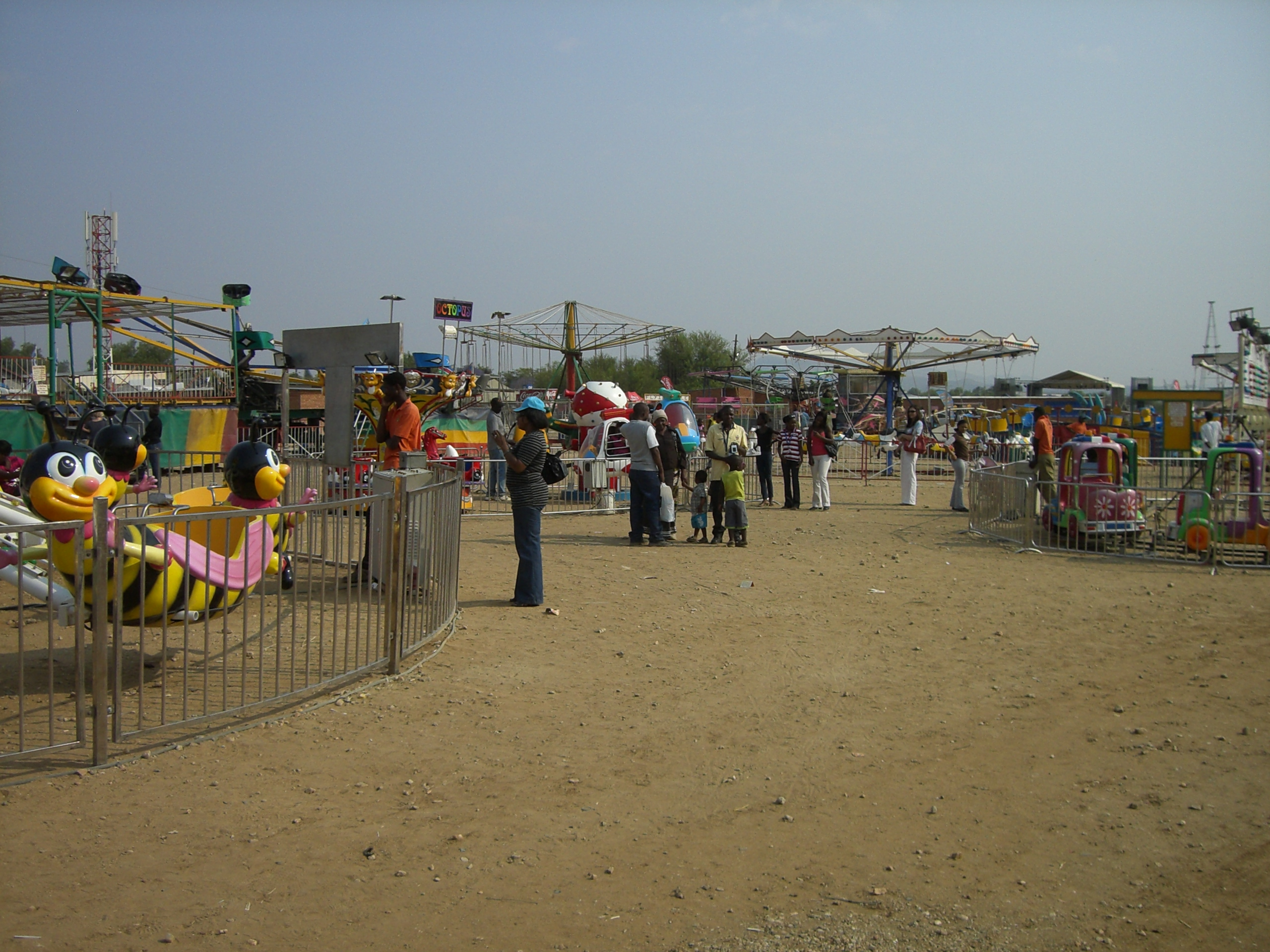
Entertainment section of the 2010 Windhoek Show

The Windhoek Industrial and Agricultural Show (WIAS, short: the Windhoek Show) is an annual trade fair in Windhoek, the capital of Namibia. It combines an agricultural exhibition, several industrial and retail offerings, and a range of entertainment facilities. The Windhoek Show was first held in 1899 and has been conducted annually since 1966. Held during the first week of October, the Windhoek Show is the biggest industrial and agricultural exhibition in Namibia. It attracts close to 100,000 visitors per year.

== History ==
The first Windhoek Show was held in 1899 when the country, then known as German South-West Africa, was still a colony of Imperial Germany. At that time, it was exclusively an agricultural exhibition. Subsequent fairs were held in 1902, 1910, 1913, and 1914. After the end of World War I, South-West Africa came under South African administration which organised its first post-war Windhoek Show in 1930.

In 1934 the Windhoek Show Grounds were laid out, an area between Windhoek's city centre and the Suiderhof suburb, next to today's Maerua Mall. These show grounds were designed primarily to house the Windhoek Industrial and Agricultural Show but the next fair was only held in 1954, and one more show in 1964. A 1961 fair was scheduled but had to be canceled due to a Foot-and-mouth disease outbreak. During that time the industrial sector was incorporated; originally only through businesses that supplied the agricultural sector but subsequently including a larger portfolio.

From 1966 onwards the Windhoek Show became an annual event. Further expansion attempts through splitting several smaller thematic shows from the main event did not become economically viable and were soon discontinued.
