= Oshigambo =

- Settlement
- Location within Namibia
- Coordinates: 17°47′S 16°04′E
- Country: Namibia
- Region: Oshikoto
- Time zone: UTC+2 (SAST)

Oshigambo is a settlement in the Oshikoto Region of northern Namibia. It is situated on the banks of Oshigambo River east of the Etosha pan.

The village has both a secondary school, Oshigambo High School, and as a primary school.

== See also ==
- Onamukulo
