= Fillemon Shuumbwa Nangolo =

Namibian traditional ruler

- Omukwaniilwa of the Ondonga

King of the Ondonga
- Reign: 2019–present
- Predecessor: Immanuel Kauluma Elifas
- Born: 4 June 1974 (age 52); Enkono, South West Africa
- Spouse: Adelheid Gustaf (m. 2007)
- House: Ondonga royal family
- Father: Namupala Nangolo
- Mother: Maria Josef

Fillemon Shuumbwa Nangolo (born 4 June 1974) is the reigning omukwaniilwa (king) of the Ondonga, an Ovambo community in northern Namibia. He succeeded his uncle Immanuel Kauluma Elifas after Elifas died on 26 March 2019. Elifas had named him deputy and heir in 2002. A rival faction crowned Konisa Kalenga on the same day in April 2019. The government recognised Nangolo under the Traditional Authorities Act on 10 June 2019, and he was installed at Onambango on 29 June 2019.

The Ondonga area lies around Namutoni on the eastern edge of the Etosha pan in the Oshikoto Region, adjoining Etosha National Park. The royal seat is the palace at Onambango, near Ondangwa in the Olukonda Constituency, on the road toward Uukwiyuushona.

== Early life and military career ==
Nangolo was born at Enkono, near Andimba Toivo ya Toivo Airport at Ondangwa. His father was Namupala gwaNangolo; his mother, Maria Josef (also given as Maria Manene Josef), was a niece of King Elifas. He was raised at Elifas's palace at Onamungundo.

He attended primary school at Okahandja in the Otjozondjupa Region and at Olukonda, then matriculated at Oshakati Senior Secondary School in Oshakati, Oshana Region. In 1999 he joined the Namibian Defence Force, completed basic training at Osona near Okahandja, and served in the air wing. In 2000–01 he trained in aircraft instruments, mechanics and flying at the Denel Technical Academy in Gauteng, South Africa, and took part in Operation Atlantic in the Democratic Republic of the Congo during the Second Congo War. Press profiles later described him as a wing commander and as an aviation auditor still called on by the Namibian Air Force after he became king. He also received instruction in common and customary law and sat on the Law Reform and Development Commission when it was chaired by Sacky Shanghala.

In June 2002 Elifas appointed him assistant and successor; the designation was restated in writing in 2012.

== Succession dispute ==
Elifas died at Onandjokwe Lutheran Hospital in Oniipa on 26 March 2019 and was buried at Olukonda on 13 April. On 14 April a faction of gazetted councillors of the Ondonga Traditional Authority crowned Nangolo at Onambango. Hours later royal elders at Onamungundo named Konisa Eino Kalenga, Nangolo's maternal uncle and Elifas's eldest surviving sister's son, arguing that custom favoured the late king's sister's line before a grand-nephew.

Nangolo's campaign operated in part from Onethindi in Oniipa; Kalenga's from the traditional-authority office at Oluno near Ondangwa. Kalenga's supporters went to the High Court of Namibia in Windhoek to block Nangolo's recognition. The urgent applications failed. On 10 June 2019 the minister of urban and rural development, Peya Mushelenga, approved Nangolo's designation under section 5(2) of the Traditional Authorities Act, 2000. Kalenga then sought to have that decision set aside, listing the minister, the governor of Oshana Region and President Hage Geingob among the respondents. A further urgent bid to stop the June installation was taken off the roll.

== Installation ==
Nangolo was installed on 29 June 2019 at Onambango. Newspapers called him the 18th or 19th king of the Aandonga. Vice-president Nangolo Mbumba, a kinsman, attended for the head of state. Mushelenga officiated as required by statute and asked the community to settle its split.

Senior councillors Vilho Kamanya and Annely (Anneli) Mbumba handed him a gavel, copies of the Constitution of Namibia and Ondonga customary law, a spear, and a hat and scarf of spotted-cat skin. George Nelulu, chair of the Oukwanyama Traditional Authority, swore him in for Queen Martha Nelumbu of Oukwanyama in the Ohangwena Region. Elder Shali Kamati and Martha GwaNamupala performed other rites.

I treat all people equally regardless of who supported which faction during the bitter internal infighting of the past years.

— Fillemon Shuumbwa Nangolo, Onambango, 29 June 2019.

== Reign ==
The homestead at Onambango became the Ondonga palace. In September 2024 the Ministry of Urban and Rural Development recorded his election as vice-chairperson of the Council of Traditional Leaders in Windhoek. In January 2026 the governor of Oshikoto Region, Sacky Kathindi, led constituency councillors and mayors from Omuthiya on a courtesy visit to the palace. On Genocide Remembrance Day in May 2026 he spoke at Olukonda against tribalism and for a shared national history linked to the Herero and Namaqua genocide.

In 2024 communal herders at Okashana in Kuukongo waNehale alleged that well-connected people had received plots under the authority. Names reported in New Era included former minister Pendukeni Iivula-Ithana, then Oshikoto governor Penda Ya Ndakolo, businessman Ben Hauwanga, SWAPO Oshikoto coordinator Armas Amukwiyu, Affirmative Repositioning leader Job Amupanda, and lawyers Sisa Namandje and Kadhila Amoomo. The king's office said allocations were for cultivation and that some fences the herders objected to were lawful grants. A primary school in the Onkumbula circuit of Oshikoto has been named after him.

== Personal life ==
He married Adelheid Gustaf at Oniihwa in the Onayena Constituency on 7 April 2007. They live at Onambango, near Ondangwa.

== See also ==
- List of Ondonga kings
- Ondonga royal family
- Immanuel Kauluma Elifas
- Nehale lya Mpingana
- Fillemon Elifas
- Ovambo people
- Ndonga dialect
- Traditional authorities in Namibia
- Heroes' Acre (Namibia)
- Nehale Senior Secondary School
- Namutoni
- Etosha National Park
- Onayena
- Olukonda
