= List of Ondonga kings =

This is a list of the kings of the Ondonga people, a Namibian subtribe of the Owambo. The kingdom was founded in 1650. Since then there have been 18 kings. The kings reside at a Royal Homestead in a village of their choice with Onamungundo having been a royal seat for more than 2 kings.

Kings of Ondonga
| No. | Name | In power | Location of court | Note, reference |
| 1. | Nembulungo lyaNgwedha | ±1650–1690 | | |
| 2. | Shindongo shaNamutenya gwa Nguti | 1690–1700 | | |
| 3. | Nangombe yaMvula | 1700–1750 | Oshamba | |
| 4. | Nembungu lyAmutundu | 1750– ca. 1820 | Iinenge | |
| 5. | Nangolo dhaAmutenya | ca. 1820–1857 | Ondonga | |
| 6. | Shipanga shaAmukwiita | 1857–1859 | | |
| 7. | Shikongo Kalulu | 1859–1874 | Omandongo | |
| 8. | Kambonde I kaNankwaya | 1874–1883 | Onamungundo | |
| 9. | Iitana yaNekwiyu | 1883–1884 | | |
| 10. | Kambonde II kaMpingana (Western Ondonga) | 1884–1909 | Onamayongo Olukonda | |
| 10. | Nehale lyaMpingana (Eastern Ondonga) | 1885–1908 | Oshitambi (Okaloko) | |
| 11. | Kambonde III (Eino Johannes) kaNgula | 1909–1912 | | |
| 12. | Nambala (Martin Elifas) yaKadhikwa | 1912–1942 | Ondjumba | |
| 13. | Eino Johannes Kambonde kaNamene | 1942–1960 | Okaloko | |
| 14. | Martin Ambala Ashikoto | 1960–1967 | Ontananga | (deposed) |
| 15. | Paulus Elifas | 1967–1970 | Omwandi | |
| 16. | Filemon yElifas lyaShindondola | 1970–1975 | Onamungundo | |
| 17. | Immanuel Kauluma Elifas | 1975–2019 | Onamungundo | |
| 18. | Fillemon Shuumbwa Nangolo | 2019– | Onambango | |
