= Ondonga royal family =

Royal family of the Ondonga people of Ovamboland, Namibia

- Country: Ovamboland, Namibia
- Current head: Fillemon Shuumbwa Nangolo
- Titles: King, natively: Omukwaniilwa

The Ondonga royal family consists of monarch of Ondonga of Namibia, the late King Immanuel Kauluma Elifas, his consorts, legitimate descendants, near relatives and female-line descendants of his great-great-grandmothers. As paramount chief within the Republic of Namibia and pursuant to the preservation of African traditional leadership, the hereditary head of the Ondonga dynasty retains kingly dignity, ethnic leadership, ritual authority and a civil list, reigning and ruling in Ondonga in conjunction with the Traditional Authority Act.

== Incumbent and family ==
The head of the Ondonga royal family was the late Immanuel Kauluma Elifas who had designated Fillemon Shuumbwa Nangolo to be King of the Ondonga nation of Namibia after his death. He was born on 9 June 1978, in Ondonga and approved by the Namibian government to be king of the Ondonga people on 10 June 2019.

Consorts

- Adelheid Gustaf - Nangolo (Queen)

Children

== Predecessors ==
- Nembulungo lyNgwedha, ±1650-1690
- Shindongo shaNamutenya gwa Nguti, 1690-1700
- Nangombe yaMvula, 1700-1750 (Oshamba)
- Nembungu lyAmutundu, 1750- ca. 1820 (Iinenge)
- Nangolo dAmutenya, ca. 1820-1857 (Ondonga)
- Shipanga shAmukwiita, 1857-1859
- Shikongo shaKalulu, 1859-1874 (Omandongo)
- Kambonde kaNankwaya, 1874-1883 (Onamungundo)
- Iitana yaNekwiyu, 1883-1884
- Kambonde kaMpingana, 26 September 1884–22 June 1909 (Western Ondonga, Olukonda)
- Nehale lyaMpingana, 26 September 1884–28 April 1908 (Eastern Ondonga, Okaloko)
- Kambonde kaNgula, 22 June 1909–1912
- Martin Nambala yaKadhikwa, 1912–1942 (Ondjumba)
- Kambonde kaNamene, 1942–1960 (Okaloko)
- Martin Ambala Ashikoto, 1960–1967 (Ontananga), deposed
- Paulus Elifas, (1967–1970) (Omwandi)
- Fillemon Elifas Shuumbwa, 1972–16 August 1975 (Onamungundo)
- Immanuel Kauluma Elifas, 16 August 1975–26 March 2019 (Onamungundo)
- Fillemon Shuumbwa Nangolo, 26 March 2019–present day
