= Traditional leadership of Namibia =

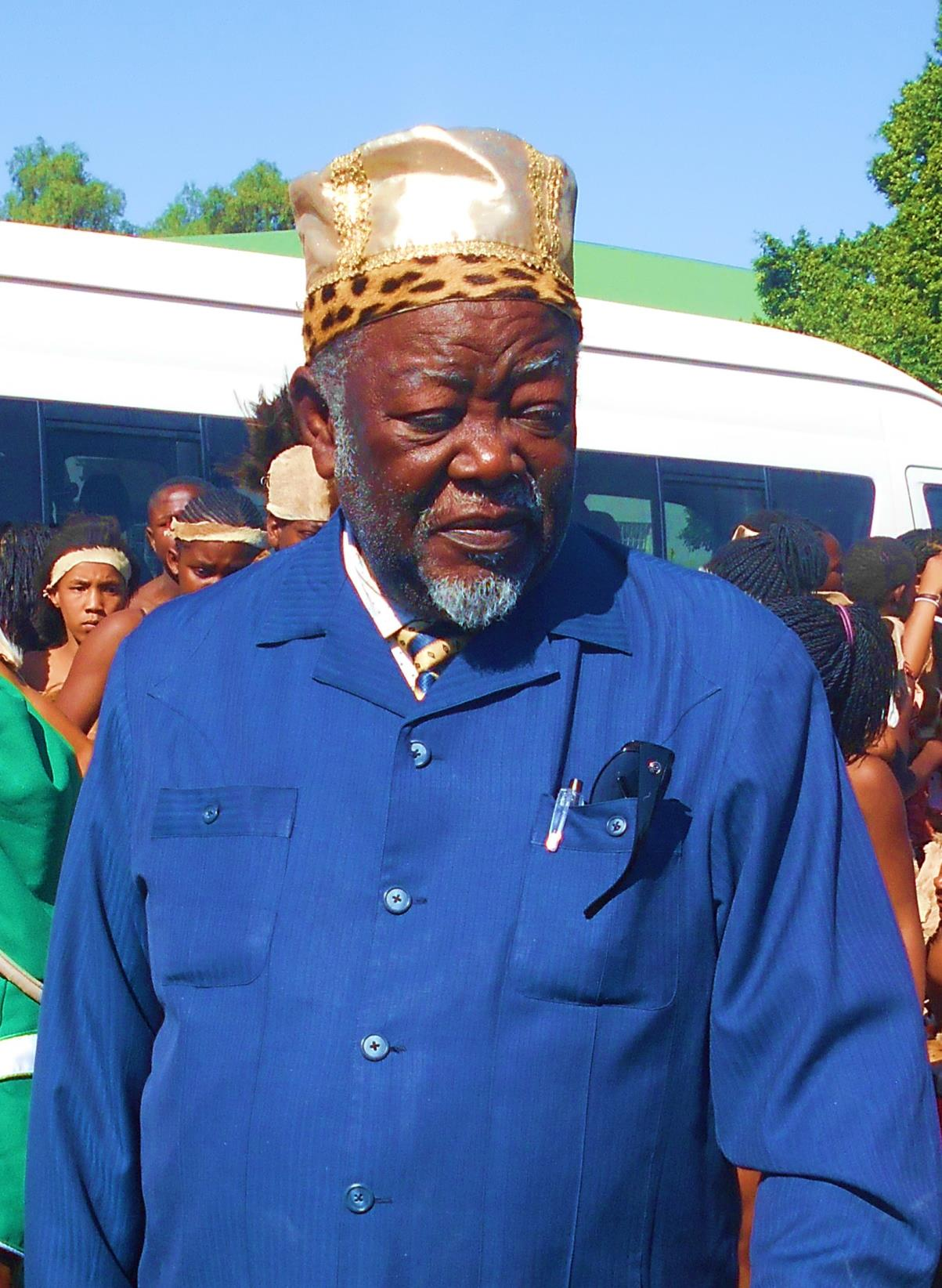
Justus ǁGaroëb, Gaob (king) of the Damara people, in 2016

Traditional leadership of Namibia is a governing structure in Namibia based on the ethnicity of the indigenous people of the territory. Acceptance of a traditional authority is vested in the Government of Namibia, executed by the minister of Urban and Rural Development. There are 51 recognised traditional authorities and a further 40 pending applications.

Traditional authorities cover the entire Namibian territory. For a traditional authority to be recognised by government it must have a sole area of jurisdiction; although virtually all places in Namibia are inhabited by members of different clans and tribes, the area of the settlements are deemed to belong to only one traditional authority. For a traditional leader to be accepted by government, they must be appointed according to the customary law of their clan, without major disputes about their current reign.

Leaders and their administrative staff are not paid by the state. Instead the traditional group's members are expected to sustain their leadership. Government did, however, give one car each to the recognised authorities, and awards allowances for fuel and administrative work. The parallel existence of traditional authorities and the Namibian government in Namibia is controversial. The traditional rulers and leaders are represented through the Council of Traditional Leaders, established by Act 13 of 1997 (GG 1706) and amended by Act 31 of 2000 (GG 2462).

== Functions ==
Traditional leaders are entrusted with the allocation of communal land and the formulation of the traditional group's customary laws.

They also take over judicial work through traditional courts, offering a way to access compensation through civil law that does not require fees or lawyers. Crime in Namibia is treated by the classical courts solely as a criminal procedure, and ends in punishment of the offender; To seek material compensation a civil case has to be opened after the criminal verdict. Traditional fines are thus, in the words of justice minister Yvonne Dausab, meant "to wipe off tears", and not to replace criminal proceedings.

Typical punishments are in money or in livestock. For instance, the traditional courts of the Ovambo people in Namibia's north fine ten cows or 15,000N$ for murder, two cows or 3,000N$ for impregnating a child, and up to six cows for theft, depending on severity. The traditional court of the Oorlam people at Vaalgras in Namibia's south, where there are few communal cattle farmers, fines three goats for theft.

In the traditional Lozi system, the king and judges appointed by him heard cases of murder. A person found guilty of killing another without just cause was sentenced to death by the king and subsequently executed. However, if the convict sought refuge in the house of Katamoyo (Mother of Life), a challenging feat, the sentence was not carried out.

== Recognised traditional authorities ==
Traditional authority	Locale	Current leader and title
Mbunza		Hompa Alfons Kaundu
Sambyu		Angelina Matumbo Ribebe
Gciriku	Ndiyona Constituency of the Kavango Region	Hompa Felix Mashika
Uukwangali	Nkurenkuru	Hompa Eugene Kudumo Siwombe
Mbukushu		Erwin Mbambo Munika
Ondonga	Onamungundo Ondangwa	Elifas Shuumbwa Nangolo
Uukwaluudhi	Tsandi	Josia Shikongo Taapopi
Ongandjera	Okahao	Johannes Mupiya (since 2012)
Uukwambi	Elim	Iipumbu Herman Iipumbu
Ombalantu	Outapi	Oswin Mukulu
Uukolonkadhi	Onesi	Daniel Shooya
Oukwanyama	Ehole	Martha Nelumbu
Ombandja	Okalongo	Matias Walaula
Subia	Bukalo, Zambezi Region	Kisco Liswani III
Mafwe	Chinchimane, Zambezi Region	Gerge Simasiku Mamili
Mayeyi		Boniface Lutibezi Shufu
Mashi		Joseph Tembwe Mayuni
ǀGowanîn	across the Kalahari Desert	Gariseb Stefanus
ǀKhomanin	in the Khomas Highland	vacant
ǃOeǂGan	of the Erongo Mountains, Usakos, and Ameib	Immanuel ǂNu-axa
Tsoaxudaman	along the Swakop River	Betuel Haraseb
ǀGaiodaman	along the Omuramba Omatako between Outjo and the Waterberg	J M Haraseb
ǂAodaman	between Kamanjab, Outjo and Otavi	Ukongo Petrus
Dâuredaman	Brandberg and vicinity	Elias Taniseb
ǀKhowesin (Witbooi Nama)	Gibeon	Christian Rooi (acting)
Bondelswarts		vacant
Soromaas		David Fredericks
Khaiǁkhaun (Red Nation)	Hoachanas	Petrus Simon Moses Kooper
ǂAonin (Southern Topnaars)	Rooibank and other settlements along the lower Kuiseb River	Seth Kooitjie
Afrikaner		vacant
ǁKhauǀgoan (Swartbooi Nama)	Rehoboth, Salem, Ameib, and Fransfontein	Gaob Charles Otto William ǀUirab
ǁHawoben	Blouwes	vacant
Vaalgras	Vaalgras	Joel Stephanus
ǃKharakhoen (Fransman Nama)	Amper-Bo	vacant
ǀNukhoen	Kunene Region	vacant
Goliath traditional authority	Berseba	vacant
ǀHai-ǀHaua	Berseba	vacant
Zeraua traditional authority	Omatjete	vacant
