= Emil Liljeblad =

Finnish pastor and missionary (1876–1937)

Karl Emil Liljeblad (27 February 1876 – 27 July 1937) was a Finnish pastor, vicar, missionary and educator, and during his final years, a researcher in Folkloristics.

== Early life and education ==
Liljeblad was born in Oulu, Finland. His parents were surveyor Gustav Wilhelm Liljeblad and Margareta Elisabeth Leiviskä. He completed the study programme in the Mission School of the Finnish Missionary Society and was ordained a missionary in 1900.

== First term in Ovamboland ==
Liljeblad arrived in Ovamboland, then German South-West Africa, together with Rev. Jooseppi Mustakallio, the Director of the Finnish Missionary Society, who came to South-West Africa for an inspection trip. This was the first visit of its kind in the oldest mission field of the FMS. They left Finland on 31 January 1900 and arrived in Ovamboland on 22 June the same year.

During his first term in Ovamboland, Liljeblad founded the Onayena mission station in Eastern Ondonga and 1903 the Nakeke mission station in Ongandjera, together with Heikki Saari. Liljeblad arrived in Ongandjera in 1903. King Shaanika was glad to have teachers in his kingdom, but Liljeblad did not get along with the king and was forced to leave the kingdom already in 1904. During his first term, Liljeblad also taught school in Ondangwa and Ontananga.

== Furlough in Finland ==
During his furlough in Finland, he studied theology, completing his studies in 1910, and in 1911 he was ordained a minister.

== Second term in Ovamboland ==
At the beginning of his second term, Liljeblad first visited the Cape, in order to acquaint himself with the educational system there. He visited institutions run by various missionary societies.

Liljeblad had been stressing the necessity of training teachers in Ovamboland for years, and now, in spite of opposition from the head of the mission field, Rev. Martti Rautanen, he was able to found a teachers' training seminary in Oniipa, and subsequently worked as its principal.

The seminary began to function in 1913, when it had six applicants. There was a classroom for it, but the students had to build a dormitory for themselves. In 1916, 7 unmarried men and 6 married men studied at the seminary. The terms ran from June to September, and from February to April. In this way, the men were able to participate in the work on their own fields outside the terms, and also they could avoid having to sit in the classroom during November and December, which were the hottest months.

Liljeblad wrote that the students were very excited about their studies. Even during the rainy season they wanted to come to the seminary once or twice a week, so they would not forget what they had learned. In 1916, the first students, four men, graduated. One student had died and one had had to abandon his studies. However, the number of students grew so that beginning in 1918, the seminary had two sections. In 1921, 30 new students were admitted.

At the end of 1918, Liljebald offered his resignation to the Board of the FMS, stating he was dissatisfied with the numbers of applicants to the seminary, and with the fact that the need for teachers in Ovamboland could not be met.

In 1918 Liljeblad was called to perform a special task in Oukwanyama. Up to that time German missionaries had been conducting missionary work there, but in 1916 the last of them had had to leave this mission field. An English border guard, Major Fairlie had built a modest church building in a place called Omafo. In 1918, a strange pastor appeared there, wanting to baptize local people. He demanded one pound per person, and when he turned out to be Catholic, Fairlie sent him away and asked Liljeblad to come and pay a visit to Oukwanyama. Liljeblad came to Omafo, consecrated the church and baptized 55 pagans. In addition, he baptized children of those who already were Christians, married several couples and confirmed youngsters in the Lutheran faith.

Just before he left for Finland, Liljeblad participated in a new administrational body, the board of the mission field in 1919. The other members were Rautanen, treasurer Kalle Petäjä and secretary Reinhold Rautanen.

== Pastoral work in Finland ==
Having returned to Finland, Liljebald worked as a pastor in Kirvu in 1920–1922 and in Simpele in 1922–1924. His last position was that of vicar of Ruskeala, near Sortavala, in 1924–1937.

== Collecting folklore in Ovamboland ==
During 1930–1932 Liljeblad travelled once more to Ovamboland, having received a grant from the Finnish Academy of Science and Letters. The Ovambo folklore materials he collected a during this journey are kept by the Division of Manuscripts of the National Library of Finland in Helsinki. These materials consist of ca. 150 handwritten notebooks, mostly in Oshiwambo. Liljeblad translated these texts into Finnish until his death, managing to translated about one half of these texts. The rest were translated during the following three decades by Mrs. Anna Glad (née Woutilainen), the second wife and widow of the missionary Aksel Glad. Mrs. Glad had worked in Ovamboland in 1901–1919 and 1926–1936, and had acted there as the first inspector of schools.

The translations have been typed up, and they contain 2016 folio sized pages, which in word processor format will yield about 1 000 pages.

Some of the notebooks contain Finnish text in Liljeblad's own hand, and it is not known if correspondent Oshiwambo texts were ever recorded. It is presumed that these Finnish texts have also been typed up.

Several scientific works published in Europe are based on these materials. One dissertation (by Märta Salokoski) is completely based on this material, and another one (by Minna Saarelma-Maunumaa) is partly based on it.

Liljeblad is also said to have published religious booklets, and he also wrote hymns for the Oshindonga hymn book.

Liljeblad also collected ethnographic and scientific collections, which were later donated by his last surviving daughter to Oulu University. The university is preparing to put these collections on permanent display.

== Personal life ==
In 1904, Liljeblad married teacher Alma Helena Kestilä. Kestilä had arrived in Ovamboland in 1902.

It seems that Liljeblad was a quick-tempered person, and he was often at odds with the head of the mission field, Rev. Martti Rautanen. Together with e.g. Anna Glad he represented a younger generation of missionaries, which considered it important to provide not only spiritual but also secular instruction to the Ovambos. It was said that during World War I his sympathies lie with the English and not with the Germans, as was the case with many other Finnish missionaries, including Rautanen.

== Finnish language publications ==
- Ruskealan 100-vuotias kirkko vuonna 1934. ('The centenary of the Ruskeala church in 1934') Sortavala, [s.n.], 1934. 17, [1] p.

== Works based on the Liljeblad folklore collection ==
- Aarni, Teddy (1982): The Kalunga Concept in Ovambo Religion from 1870 onwards. Stockholm: Stockholm University.
- Hiltunen, Maija (1986): Witchcraft and Sorcery in Ovambo. Helsinki: The Finnish Anthropological Society.
- Hiltunen, Maija (1993): Good Magic in Ovamboland. Helsinki: The Finnish Anthropological Society.
- Kuusi, Matti (1970): Ovambo proverbs with African parallels. Translated by Anja Miller, Matt T. Salo, Eugene Holman. FF communications, no. 208. Finnish Academy of Science and Letters.
- Kuusi, Matti (1974): Ovambo riddles. Translated by Eugene Holman. FF communications, no. 215. Finnish Academy of Science and Letters.
- Saarelma-Maunumaa, Minna (2003): Edhina Ekogidho: Names As Links: The Encounter Between African And European Anthroponymic Systems Among The Ambo People in Namibia. Electronic doctoral thesis, Department of Finnish, University of Helsinki.
- Salokoski, Märta (2002): Ritual regicide versus succession strife: on divine kingship as an order creating element in the political life of two Owambo kingdom. Helsinki: Helsinki University.
- Salokoski, Märta (2006): How Kings are Made, How Kingship Changes: A Study of Ritual and Ritual Change in Pre-colonial and Colonial Owamboland. Helsinki: Helsinki University.

== Bibliography ==
- Lehtonen, Lahja: Schools in Ovamboland from 1870 to 1970. The Finnish Evangelical Lutheran Mission, 1999. ISBN 951-624-257-X
- Peltola, Matti (1958). Sata vuotta suomalaista lähetystyötä 1859–1959. II: Suomen Lähetysseuran Afrikan työn historia [A hundred years of Finnish missionary work 1859–1959. II: The history of the Finnish Missionary Society in Africa]. Helsinki: Suomen Lähetysseura (The Finnish Missionary Society).
- Peltola, Matti (1994). Martti Rautanen: Mies ja kaksi isänmaata [Martti Rautanen: A Man with Two Native Countries] (in Finnish). Helsinki: Kirjapaja. ISBN 951-625-283-4.
