= Shuumbwa =

Shuumbwa is a surname. Notable people with the name include:

- Erastus Shuumbwa (born 1974), Namibian businessman
- Fillemon Elifas Shuumbwa (1932–1975), chief of Ondonga
- Fillemon Shuumbwa Nangolo (born 1974), king of Ondonga
