= Iihongo =

Village in Namibia

Coordinates: 18°03′S 16°10′E

Iihongo is a settlement in the northern part of Namibia, 25 kilometres (16 mi) east of Ondangwa. It was founded in 1889. Iihongo was a theater of operations in the Herero Wars, when Nehale ya Mpingana attacked the Germans in 1904 in the Battle of Namutoni.
