= Okahao =

Town in northern Namibia

- Location within Namibia
- Coordinates: 17°53′S 15°6′E
- Country: Namibia
- Region: Omusati Region
- Constituency: Okahao Constituency

Population (2023)
  - Total: 7,486
- Time zone: UTC+2 (SAST)
- Climate: BSh

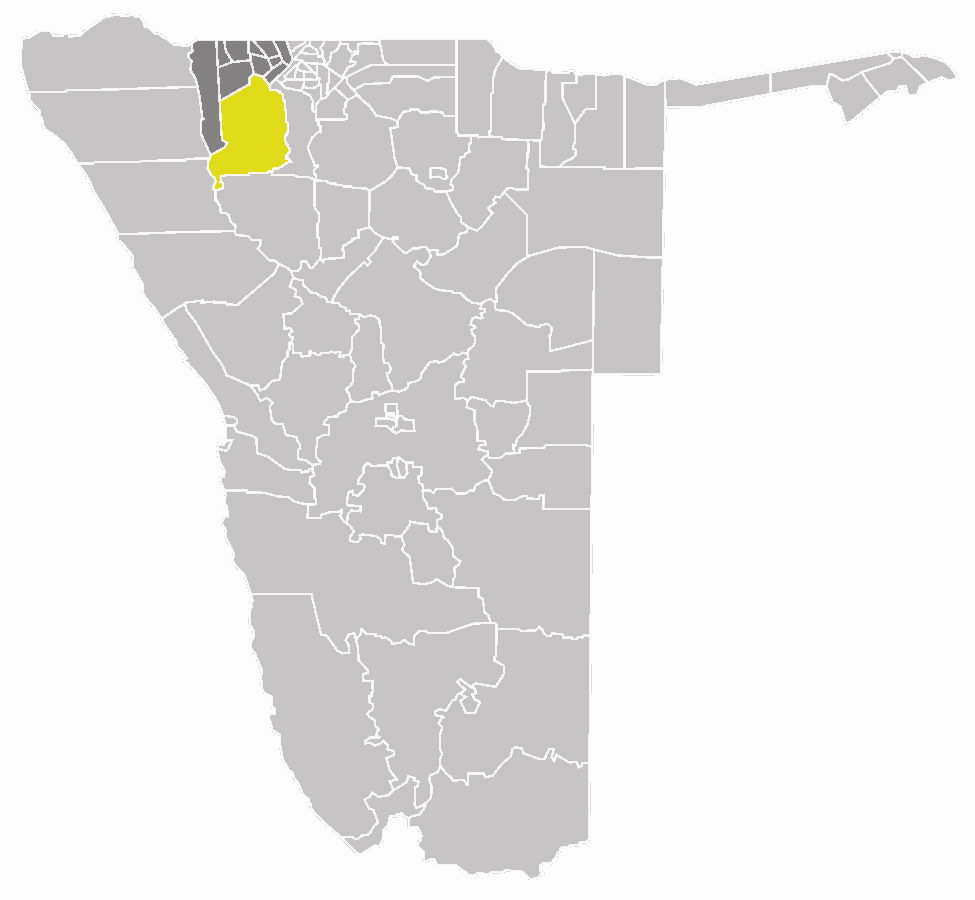
map of the Okahao constituency within the Omusati region, Namibia

Okahao is a town in the Omusati Region of northern Namibia and the district capital of the Okahao electoral constituency which is the largest constituency in Omusati region in terms of area. It is a former mission station of the Finnish Missionary Society. Okahao had a population of 7,486 people in 2023.

== Geography ==
It is situated in the Ongandjera tribal area 73 kilometres (45 mi) west of Oshakati on the main road MR123 (Outapi — Tsandi — Okahao).

The area around Okahao is flat, arable land which is mainly used for subsistence farming. Okahao is the largest town in the Ongandjera tribal area, the birthplace of Namibia's founding president Sam Nujoma. The language spoken there is mainly the Oshiwambo dialect Oshingadjera.

Historical population
Year	Pop.	±% p.a.
2011	1,833	—
2023	7,486	+12.44%

== History ==
=== The first visit of Martti Rautanen to Ongandjera ===
When the first Finnish missionaries had arrived to Omandongo in Ovamboland on 9 July 1870, they immediately took measures aiming at establishing a missionary presence in two other tribal areas also, that is, in Uukwambi and Ongandjera. Already four days later, Pietari Kurvinen, Martti Rautanen, Karl August Weikkolin and Antti Piirainen, left for Uukwambi, to the court of King Nayuma, where they arrived on July 16. And still within the same month, Rautanen rode on an ox to visit King Tsheya of Ongandjera.

=== The founding of the first mission station ===
The Finns wanted to establish a mission station in Ongandjera, but Carl Hugo Hahn of the Rhenish Mission wanted to have a permission for this undertaking from the board of directors of the Finnish Missionary Society. The matter was put off until the following year, when Rautanen was able to visit Ongandjera in the month of May, with the king receiving him in a friendly manner.

Rautanen gave the new mission station the name Rehoboth. Heinrich Kleinschmidt, the father of Rautanen's fiancée Frieda Kleinschmidtin had earlier given the same name to a mission station he had founded in Namaland. By the end of July, Rautanen had built a house for the mission station, and Tobias Reijonen, a new arrival that year, joined him there at the time.

Flag of Okahao

The daily life in Ongandjera was difficult for them, since they had few European provisions, and few goods with which to exchange grain from the local people.

The rainy season of 1871–72 was difficult for Rautanen and Reijonen, as they both fell ill with typhoid fever. Their servant boy, who was superstitious, ran away, but finally they were able to convince another boy to take a letter to Uukwambi, and Pietari Kurvinen, accompanied with his wife, came to help them. They took with them Reijonen, who was more seriously ill, and left Rautanen in Ongandjera. When he had recovered sufficiently, he left the mission station in the care of Reijonen and Karl August Weikkolin and went to Hereroland, where he married Frieda Kleinschmid, before going to Walvis Bay, where he convalesced from his illness.

While Rautanen was gone, Reijonen and Weikkolin had a conflict with the king. The latter had borrowed a ladder from the Finns, and when Reijonen demanded to have it back, the king ordered the Finns the leave his kingdom. Peltola says that the Owambo concept of king's powers and the European concept of private ownership were at odds here, but it is also likely that the Finns were lacking skills in diplomacy as well.

Rautanen heard about this incident already in Hereroland, and he therefore travelled directly to Ongandjera. A short note on the table at the mission station house told him what the situation was. Now Rautanen's chances of working in this tribe were limited to what he could do with his servants. Furthermore, Frieda Rautanen fell ill with malaria, and Martti was afraid she would die of this disease. However, she recovered, and they subsequently left for Ondonga.

King Tsheya would have wanted Rautanen back, and even together with another Finnish brother, but issued such conditions for the latter that he would in practice have been the king's servant. The missionaries discussed this situation amongst themselves in May 1873, but the result was that they decided to give up work in Ongandjera. In August, Rautanen went there to collect his belongings.

=== Preparing for a new start in the 1890s ===
In the 1890s, both the Rhenish Mission and the Catholic Church wanted to begin missionary work in Ongandjera, but the Finns were opposed to this, and nothing came of the Germans’ plans. However, the Rhenish Mission wanted to make sure that the Catholics would not come to Ongandjera, and they therefore asked the Finns to begin work there again. After some negotiations between the Finns and the Germans, it was decided to establish a joint Finnish-German station in Ongandjera, but the board of directors of the Finnish Missionary Society did not agree to this. Furthermore, the raids of the King Nebumbo of Uukwambi to the other tribes would have made it very difficult for Europeans to work in Ongandjera. Thus, nothing came of these plans at this time.

=== A new mission station is founded in 1903 ===
In July 1903, Emil Liljeblad was sent to Ongandjera, and in September the same year Heikki Saari was sent to accompany him there. The new station was built four kilometres from the old one, in a place called Nakeke, which was about half a kilometre from the court of King Tshaanika.

However, Nakeke soon turned out to be a bad place, as during the dry season it was not possible to obtain water anywhere near it. Thus in 1908, Saari build a new station very close to the old site of Rehoboth, and this name was used for the new mission station.

=== The Finns get competitors ===
In 1924, the Roman Catholics were given a permission to start work in Ongandjera, but for a long time they did not even meet them. The South West African Administrator's Office had declared that in the future, the Finns would be allowed to work in Ondonga only, while Oukwanyama would be given the Anglicans, and Uukwambi and Ongandjera would be given to the Catholics. However, in practice the Finns went on to work among all these tribes.

=== Later developments ===
In 1947, the Finns founded the first women's seminary of Ovamboland in Ongandjera. Women had earlier been trained together with men at the Oniipa seminary, but due disciplinary problems there, the Finns had decided to establish a women's institution in Ongandjera.

By the 1960s the mission station was called Okahao.

== Infrastructure ==
Okahao has an east/west, unpaved, undeveloped airstrip of 1,020 metres (3,346 ft) length (ICAO code: FYOH, IATA code: none), a clinic, and two hospitals.

Okahao has two secondary schools namely Shaanika Nashilongo SS and Niilo Taapopi SS (Etalaleko SS), one combined school (Nangombe Combined School), one primary school (Okahao Primary School), and more than three private school. There is also the Okahao community library, a police station and a prison. Several ministries have representation in the town such as the Ministry of Youth, Ministry of Agriculture, Ministry of Works & Transport etc. It has two malls currently being built as of 2023 the Okahao Town Mall and King Jafet Munkundi Mall. The Ongozi Lodge and Elago Guesthouse caters for tourists. The town of Okahao has two churches, Emmanuel Church Okahao of the pentecostal denomination and ELCIN Okahao Parish of the Lutheran denomination. It has two open markets.

As of November 2009, the mayor of Okahao was David Uuzombala Isai.

== Politics ==
Okahao is governed by a town council that has seven seats. Omusati Region, to which Okahao belongs, is a stronghold of Namibia's ruling SWAPO party. In the run up to the 2009 general election, campaigners for the Rally for Democracy and Progress were driven out of the town by school children. For the 2015 local authority election no opposition party nominated a candidate, and SWAPO won uncontested.

SWAPO also won the 2020 local authority election. It obtained 391 votes and gained five seats. The Independent Patriots for Change (IPC), an opposition party formed in August 2020, obtained 141 votes and gained the remaining two seats.

Okahao local elections 2020
Party	Votes	Percentage	Seats
SWAPO	391	73,5%	5
Independent Patriots for Change	141	26,5%	2
Total	532	100%	7

== Literature ==
- Peltola, Matti (1958). Sata vuotta suomalaista lähetystyötä 1859–1959. II: Suomen Lähetysseuran Afrikan työn historia [‘One Hundred Years of Finnish Missionary Work 1859–1959. II: The History of FMS’s Missionary Work in Africa’]. Helsinki: The Finnish Missionary Society.
- Pentti, Elias (1958). Ambomaa [‘Ovamboland’]. Helsinki: The Finnish Missionary Society.
