= Fillemon =

Fillemon is a given name. Notable people with the name include:

- Fillemon Kanalelo (born 1971), Namibian footballer
- Fillemon Shuumbwa Nangolo (born 1974), king of Ondonga
- Fillemon Elifas Shuumbwa (1932–1975), chief of Ondonga
