= Jooseppi Mustakallio =

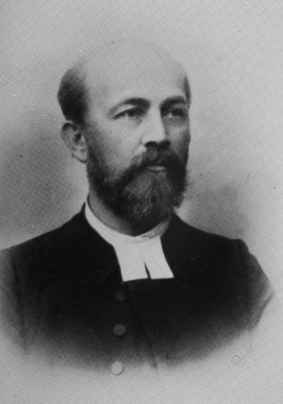
- Born: Josef Schwartzberg; 18 July 1857; Säräisniemi, Finland
- Died: 20 April 1923 (aged 65); Parikkala, Finland
- Movement: Lutheran

Jooseppi Mustakallio (June 18, 1857 – April 20, 1923), originally Josef Schwartzberg, was a Finnish minister and the fourth mission director of the Finnish Missionary Society, after Akseli Hirn. He was also a poet and a lyricist. His best known poem is called "Evening Song".

== Background ==
Mustakallio's parents were chaplain Henrik Schwartzberg ja Laura Katariina Stenbäck. He was born in Säräisniemi. Mustakallio graduated from the Kuopio Lyceum in 1878 and obtained a bachelor's degree in philosophy in 1883.

Mustakallio first worked as teacher in Pori, teaching religion and the Finnish language. In 1889 he was ordained a minister. After that he taught religion in Savonlinna and Kuopio.

Mustakallio became an employee of the FMS in 1897, first as a teacher of the FMS Mission School. During the summer of 1898 he travelled to Germany, in order to acquaint himself with the work of the various German missionary societies.

== Tenure as the mission director 1898–1913 ==
Mustakallio was elected mission director in 1898.

=== Inspection trip to Ovamboland in 1900 ===
The FMS had long been planning an inspection of the mission field in Ovamboland in South West Africa, which was at the time the only mission field of this organization. The Finns had worked there for 30 years, without a single visit from Finland.

During the last few years, the Finnish missionaries had been criticized heavily in Finland, for an apparent lack of results. For this reason the missionaries had been hoping for a visit from by the director of the FMS. At that time there were four missionaries in the field with their families, along with two unmarried female missionaries.

Mustakallio left for Africa on 31 January 1900, and he arrived there on 22 June the same year, together with Emil Liljeblad, who now began his first term in Ovamboland. Mustakallio stayed on the field for six weeks. He first visited the mission station of Olukonda. The 30th anniversary of Finnish mission work was held there, and there were 600 persons present at the festivities. Mustakallio inspected all the schools and the mission stations of Olukonda, Ondangwa and Oniipa as well as the auxiliary mission station of Omulonga. He was due to stay for four months on the field, but the visit was shortened to six weeks, one of the reasons for this was that he fell ill with malaria.

Before the visit, the livelihood of the missionaries had been a big problem, the allocated monies having been insufficient, but as a result of this inspection trip, the wages of the missionaries were raised.

=== Mission work is begun in China ===
The experiences of other mission societies had shown, that the work benefited from having more than one mission field. For this reason, the board of trustees of the FMS began to contemplate the opening of another mission field, preferably somewhere closer to Finland than the mission field in SW Africa. In the annual convention of 1899, Mustakallio suggested that another mission field be opened somewhere in Northern China. The convention approved of this idea.

One of the ideas behind this decision was that interaction between missionaries of different mission fields would be fruitful for the work of the mission society as a whole. It was also surmised that with a new mission field, support for mission work would grow in Finland. The third argument went as follows: if the mission society only had one mission field, and for some unforeseen reasons the work there would have to be abandoned, then the mission society would have nowhere to pursue its goals. In Ovamboland the society was already in a difficult situation, as its work was confined to the kingdom of Ondonga with a population of only some 21000 persons. For these reasons it was considered wise to open a second mission field.

At first the FMS considered work in Manchuria, or at least somewhere in Northern China, but in the end Hunan was chosen, because it had been inaccessible for foreigners for a long time and had only recently been opened for mission work. When the Boxer Rebellion and its aftermath were over, the first Finnish missionaries to China were sent along, and they stepped ashore in Shanghai in October 1901. It seems that Hannes Sjöblom made the final choice of the location of the new mission field, after he had consulted a number of mission societies that worked in China.

=== Moving to parish work ===
The post as the mission director had been a demanding one for Mustakallio, and his tenure had been marked by restlessness. This was due to his intensive approach towards his duties, along with his impatient nature, as he wanted to make quick decisions and achieve more or less instant closures. It seems that in 1910 he was beginning to contemplate moving to a post in some parish of the Finnish church. He stated that his nervous system had been overburdened and his energy was insufficient for the work as the mission director, and in February 1911 he informed the board of trustees that he had sought a job as the dean of Porvoo. However, he was not elected to this post.

Around this time, a new inspection trip to Ovamboland was planned, and due to Mustakallio's situation, the vice director Hannu Haahti was sent there. Mustakallio now felt that he had been excluded from some of his most important duties and protested, but the board did not change their decision.

In 1913 Mustakallio applied for the post of the vicar of Viipuri Rural Parish. He received the majority of the votes, and then moved to his new post later during the same year. Matti Tarkkanen was elected as his successor in the mission society, but he only assumed this post in February 1914.

== After the mission society ==
Mustakallio worked as the vicar of the Viipuri Rural Parish from 1913 to 1919. He was granted the title of a provost in 1915. He moved to Parikkala in 1919, becoming the local vicar there. He was appointed the rural dean of the area in 1920. He worked as the assessor of the Savonlinna cathedral chapter from 1918 to 1912. He died in 1923 in Parikkala, Finland.

== Private life ==
Mustakallio married Agnes Selma Helena Lampén in 1886.

== Works ==
- Ihmisen aistin-elimistä eli aistimista. Kansantajuisia luennoita Kuopiossa 12. ('On human sensory perception. Lectures in a popular manner.') Kuopio 1879 (under the name Jooseppi Schwartzberg).
- Virolaisia satuja viron kielen oppivaisten hyödyksi, selityksillä varustanut J. Mustakallio. ('Estonian folk tales.') Helsinki 1881.
- Pulmusparvi, runokokoelma. ('A flock of snow buntings') WSOY 1886.
- Muutamia piirteitä Ilmestyskirjan ymmärtämiseksi ('Some features that enable one to understand the Apocalypse'), In: Kuopion klassillinen lysee. Kertomus lukuvuodesta 1895–1896 ('The classical lyceum of Kuopio in 1895–1896'). Kuopio 1896.
- Pakanain paatumisesta ja pelastuksesta eli Roomalaisepistolan ensimmäinen luku: hartaushetkiä varten. ('On the hardened nature and salvation of pagans, or the first chapter of the Epistle to the Romans') Suomen Lähetysseura 1899.
- Pakanalähetyksen vaikutus hengelliseen elämään kotimaassa, Pakanalähetyksen kirjasia 12. ('The effect of missionary work among pagans on the spiritual life in the home country. Booklets of the Missionary Society 12') Suomen Lähetysseura 1900.
- Käyntini kuningas Kambonden luona, Pakanalähetyksen kirjasia 13. ('My visit to Kambonde. Booklets of the Missionary Society 12.') Suomen Lähetysseura 1901.
- Kuningas Nehalen pyyntö, Pakanalähetyksen kirjasia 15. ('The request of King Nehale. Booklets of the Missionary Society 15.') Suomen Lähetysseura 1901.
- Pienoiskuva Ondongasta. ('A miniature view of Ondonga.') Suomen Lähetysseura 1903.
- Israelin tulevaisuus: Room. 11: 25–27 mukaan. ('The future of Israel, according to Romans 11: 25–27.') Suomen Lähetysseura 1904.
- Herran tulemisen tunnusmerkit. ('Signs of the coming of the Lord.') Suomen Lähetysseura 1906.
- Madagaskarin herätys v. 1899–1909. ('The Madagascar revival.') Suomen Lähetysseura 1909.
- Suomen lähetysseura 1859–1909: Suomen lähetyssanomia: riemujuhlanumero, ('The Finnish Missionary Society 1859–1909'). Ed. by Uno Paunu and Joos. Mustakallio. Suomen Lähetysseura 1909.

== Sources ==
- Hirvonen, Maija (toim.) 1993: Suomen kirjailijat 1809–1916. SKS:n Toimituksia 570. SKS, Helsinki.
- Suomen kirjailijat -tietokanta.
- Paasio, K. A., et al.: Kansallinen elämänkerrasto 4, WSOY, 1932.
- Peltola, Matti; Saarilahti, Toivo & Savolainen, Paavo (1959). Mestarin käskystä. Suomalaisen pakanalähetystyön historiaa ['On the order of the master. History of Finnish missionary work among the heathen']. Helsinki: Agricola-seura. p. 73.
- Peltola, Matti (1958). Sata vuotta suomalaista lähetystyötä 1859–1959. II: Suomen Lähetysseuran Afrikan työn historia ['A Hundred Years of Finnish Missionary Work. 1859–1959. II: The FMS in Africa']. Helsinki: Agricola-seura.
- Lehtonen, Ensio, ym.: Pohjoismaiden lähetyshistoria, Kuva ja Sana, 1948.
- "Helsingin yliopiston ylioppilasmatrikkeli 1853–1899, Schwartzberg (→ Mustakallio) Jooseppi". 2003–2015.
