= Elifas =

Elifas may refer to:

- Elifas Andreato (1946–2022), Brazilian graphic designer
- Elifas Bisanda (born 1956), Tanzanian academic
- Elifas Dingara (born 1964), Namibian politician
- Immanuel Kauluma Elifas (c. 1934–2019), Namibian traditional ruler
- Fillemon Elifas Shuumbwa (1932–1975), Namibian traditional ruler

== See also ==
- Elias
