= Omandongo =

- Location within Namibia
- Coordinates: 17°58′59.99″S 16°12′0″E
- Country: Namibia
- Region: Oshikoto Region

Omandongo is a populated place in the Onayena Constituency in the Oshikoto Region in northern Namibia, and the region which used to be called Ovamboland.

The Finnish Missionary Society began its missionary work in Omandongo in 1870. This was the first mission station for Finnish missionaries in the whole world. It was occupied by Finnish missionaries during 1870–88.

== History ==
The first missionaries of the Finnish Missionary Society arrived in Omandongo on 9 July 1870 from Otjimbingwe in the Hereroland via Omaruru. Omandongo was part of the kingdom of the King Shikongo of Ondonga.

When the Finns arrived there, there was one structure at Omandongo, a house that had been built by Frederick Green, assistant to the merchant Andersson. It had been donated to Carl Hugo Hahn of the Rhenish Mission, and he in turn gave it to the Finns.

The Finns who arrived in Omandongo were the following:

Name	Profession	First term^{a}	Second term	Third term
Botolf Bernhard Björklund	missionary	1870–82		
Karl Emanuel Jurvelin	missionary	1870–73		
Pietari Kurvinen	missionary	1870–74		
Alexander Malmström	missionary	1870–73		
Martti Rautanen	missionary	1870–91	1892–1903	1904–26 (†)
Karl Leonhard Tolonen	missionary	1870–76		
Karl August Weikkolin	missionary	1870–78	1880–87	1890–91 (†)
Juho Heinonen	craftsman	1870–78		
Antti Piirainen	craftsman	1870–74	^{b}	

Notes:

^{a} Note: In official works of history the first term of these missionaries is given as having begun in 1868, because they arrived on 30 December that year in Cape Town and on to Stellenbosch on the same day.

^{b} Piirainen acted during 1874–1910 as the FMS representative in Omaruru in Hereroland.

The Omandongo mission station had to be abandoned in late September or early October 1888, because of the despotic behaviour of Prince Nehale of Ondonga. His men murdered a South African merchant named William Jordan practically in the yard of the mission station. Nehale’s men also tried to “purchase” an ox cart from the Finns, apparently offering nothing as compensation. The Finns then fled to King Kambonde in Olukonda.

In Ondonga, the work of the missionaries soon expanded so that several new mission stations were founded. These were Olukonda (1871–), Oniipa (1872–76, 1888–), Ondjumba (1872–76) and Omulonga (1874–1888).

Later also the following mission stations were founded in Ondonga: Ondangwa (1890–1913, from 1915 on a government station) and Ontananga (1900–), Onayena (1902–06, 1907–), Oshigambo (1908–) and Onandjokwe (1910–).

Oniipa, Onandjokwe and Oshigambo had the longest life as mission stations. (The end of this history is not given here, since the sources used do not extend to the end of this the time period. These former mission stations continue as important centres of the activities of the ELCIN church.)

== Festive occasions ==
=== 30 year celebrations ===
The 30th anniversary of the arrival of the Finnish missionaries was celebrated at Olukonda, since Omandongo had been abandoned already years earlier. The festivities were conducted on 7 July 1900. Among those present was the director of the Finnish Missionary Society, the Rev. Jooseppi Mustakallio. The festivities were conducted out of doors, and there were 600 people present.

=== Centennial celebrations ===
The centennial celebrations of missionary work in Ovamboland were held at Omandongo in July 1970. There was a large wooden cross at the site, and the first number was a re-enactment of the arrival of the missionaries 100 years earlier. Several male missionaries, with their safari helmets on, acted the roles of the original arrivals on ox carts. Students of the Engela Parish Institute acted the part of the indigenes.

It was estimated that at least 5500 persons participated, since there was a special badge on sale and this was the number of badges sold. But many people also were present without badges, according to various estimates 1000 persons or even 2000 persons.

The liturgy of the festive service was conducted by Mikko Ihamäki and Bishop Leonard Auala, and the sermon was held by Kleopas Dumeni. The festivities were led by the Rev. Matias Ngipandula.

28 speeches were held at the festivities, 15 of which were interpreted to other languages. Seven choirs performed, and they sand altogether 18 songs. Among the performers was also the brass band of the Rhenish Mission youth. Five plays were also performed during the festivities.

The festivities had an ecumenical aspect, as several Christian denominations were represented, among the not only Lutheran Ovambos but also Lutheran Hereros, belonging to a different church, as well as the Reformed Christian, Anglicans and Roman Catholics. The government of South Africa was represented by Chief Commissar J. M. de Wet, who emphasised that the Ovambos, the Boers and the Finns must work together in order to improve the situation of the Ovambos

Everything went peacefully, and the biggest problem was caused by a couple of scorpion stings.

The wooden cross at the site has since been burned, apparently as a wanton act.

== Finns buried in Omandongo ==
- Henrik Rautanen (d. 1880).

== Bibliography ==
- Peltola, Matti (1958). Sata vuotta suomalaista lähetystyötä 1859–1959. II: Suomen Lähetysseuran Afrikan työn historia [‘One Hundred Years of Finnish Missionary Work 1859–1959. II: The History of FMS’s Missionary Work in Africa’]. Helsinki: The Finnish Missionary Society.
- Peltola, Matti; Saarilahti, Toivo & Savolainen, Paavo (1959). Mestarin käskystä. Suomalaisen pakanalähetystyön historiaa [‘By the Order of the Master. History of Finnish Missionary Work Among Pagans.’]. Helsinki: The Agricola Society.
