= Sirelius =

Sirelius is a surname. Notable people with the surname include:

- K. J. G. Sirelius (1818–1888), Finnish missionary
- Ian Sirelius (born 1987), Swedish footballer
