= Marx Nekongo =

Namibian politician

Marx Nekongo is a Namibian politician and member of SWAPO. He was councillor of Onayena Constituency from 1998 to 2015 and regional councillor for Oshikoto Region in the National Council of Namibia from 2010 to 2015. Nekongo is an Oshiwambo speaker and was born and raised in Ondonga.

In 2014, he was awarded The Excellent Order of the Eagle: Third Class by President Hifikepunye Pohamba.
