= Martha Nelumbu =

Namibian traditional ruler

Ohamba of the Oukwanyama
- Reign: November 2005 – present
- Predecessor: Kornelius Mwetupunga Shelungu
- Born: 7 August 1931 (age 95); Oifidi, Portuguese Angola
Names
- Martha Mwadinomho yaKristian Nelumbu

Martha Mwadinomho yaKristian Nelumbu (born 7 August 1931) is the Ohamba (queen) of the Oukwanyama, a dynasty of the Ovambo people in northern Namibia. She was crowned in November 2005, succeeding her cousin Kornelius Mwetupunga Shelungu. She is the first woman leader to head this traditional authority.

Queen Mwadinomho lives at the royal residence in Omhedi. Over the years she has given shelter to vulnerable children; As of 2023 there were over 60 of them in her homestead.

== Honors ==
Mwadinomho Combined School in Ondeihaluka is named after her.

The Namibia University of Science and Technology (Nust) on 3 May 2024 gave her an honorary doctorate degree. This was done during the first ever graduation at NUST Eenhana Satellite Campus. She was conferred an Honorary Doctor of Philosophy (Honoris Causa) in Leadership and Change Management which was awarded due to her accomplishments.

== See also ==
- Traditional leadership of Namibia
- List of current constituent monarchs
