= Onathinge =

- Village
- Location in Namibia
- Coordinates: 18°00′22″S 16°15′52″E
- Country: Namibia
- Region: Oshikoto Region

Government
  - Type: Local Traditional Authority
- Elevation: 3,560 ft (1,085 m)
- Time zone: UTC+1 (South African Standard Time)
- Climate: BSh

Onathinge is a settlement in northern Namibia, Onayena Constituency situated in Oshikoto Region in the Ondonga area, the village has schools including Onathinge Primary and Secondary Schools. The economy is based on substance farming. It is one of the biggest villages in Onayena with infrastructures such as a clinic, and a tarred road, it is also electrified.
