= Oniiwe =

- Settlement
- Location in Namibia
- Coordinates: 17°55′00″S 16°13′00″E
- Country: Namibia
- Region: Oshikoto Region

Government
  - Type: Local Traditional Authority
  - Senior Headman: Tk. Joseph Simaneka Asino
- Elevation: 3,560 ft (1,085 m)
- Time zone: UTC+2 (South African Standard Time)
- Climate: BSh

Oniiwe is a small settlement in northern Namibia, Onayena Constituency situated in Oshikoto Region in the Ondonga area, the village has schools including Oniiwe Primary School, Uuyoka Junior Primary School also known as Mateus Namwiha Primary School, Ambunda Primary School which comprises grades 1 to 7. The economy is based on substance farming. It is one of the biggest villages in Onayena, neighboring settlements are Uuyoka, Uukete, Oniimwandi, Ompugulu among others. The village is without infrastructures such as a clinic, or a road but was electrified in 2007.
