= Uuyoka =

Small settlement in Onayena Constituency

Uuyoka is a small settlement in Onayena Constituency, Oshikoto Region in Namibia, the village has schools including Uuyoka Combined School which comprises grades 1 to 9. The economy is based on subsistence farming. It is one of the biggest villages in Onayena. Neighbouring settlements are Oniiwe, Uukete, Oniimwandi, Oniiwe, Ompugulu, Oniimwandi, Omandongo, Onambeke, Uukete, Ethindi, Enkolo, Iikokola, Oniihwa, Okakwiyu, Omadhiya, Okambogo, Okakololo Village, Iihongo Uushinga, Onamutene, Shimbobela, Okaliveva among others. The village has bad network coverage and without critical road infrastructure and a clinic, but the school was electrified in 2007.
