= Shilongo Uukule =

Head of a clan

Shilongo Filippus Uukule (1919 at Onyaanya – 2010) was senior headman of the Uukwanambwa, a clan of the Ovambo people in Namibia. His residence is located in the Onyaanya Constituency of the Oshikoto Region. He led the Uukwanambwa for 31 years after his father's death and was the senior advisor of King Immanuel Elifas Kauluma of the Ondonga.

== Recognition ==
Shilongo Uukule is named after Uukule Senior Secondary School a secondary school situated in the northern part of Namibia in the Onyaanya Constituency of Oshikoto Region. Uukule was established and officially opened in 1990 after the independence of Namibia.
