= Kambonde kaMpingana =

Omukwaniilwa of the Ondonga (1865–1909)

Kambonde II kaMpingana
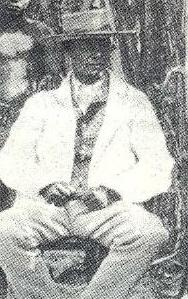
- Kambonde kaMpingana in 1900

King of the Ondonga
- Reign: 26 September 1884 – 22 June 1909 (Disputed with Nehale lyaMpingana until 1908)
- Predecessor: Iitana yaNekwiyu
- Successor: Kambonde III kaNgula
- Born: 1865
- Died: 22 June 1909 (aged 43–44)

Kambonde II kaMpingana (1865 – 22 June 1909) was the omukwaniilwa of Ondonga from 1884 until his death in 1909. He was the brother of Nehale lyaMpingana, with whom he shared a prolonged power struggle over control of the Ondonga. His reign was marked by political divisions within the Ondonga and increasing European influence in the region.

== Division of Ondonga ==
Following the death of King Iitana yaNekwiyu on 26 September 1884, Kambonde became the king of Ondonga. However, his younger brother, Nehale, refused to acknowledge his authority. This led to the division of Ondonga into two separate territories: western Ondonga, ruled by Kambonde, and eastern Ondonga, ruled by Nehale. Kambonde maintained diplomatic relations with missionaries and European settlers, in contrast to Nehale’s resistance to foreign influence. The Finnish Missionary Society, viewing Nehale as an obstacle to their work, supported Kambonde with weapons and ammunition to strengthen his position.

== The Upingtonia Agreement (1885) ==
In 1885, Kambonde entered into an agreement with South African explorer William Worthington Jordan, selling 2,500 km² of Ondonga land, including Grootfontein and the Tsumeb copper mines. The transaction, which included £300 in cash, 25 guns, a salted horse, and a barrel of brandy, resulted in the establishment of the Republic of Upingtonia. The deal angered many people of Ondonga and Ovambo community and increased tensions between Kambonde and Nehale. In 1886, Nehale led an attack on Upingtonia, killing Jordan and ending the settlement.

== Relations with Germany ==
As German influence in Ovamboland increased, Kambonde maintained a diplomatic stance. By 1898, he was in favor of Ovamboland becoming part of the German protectorate. Finnish missionary Martti Rautanen, a key advisor, played a role in influencing Kambonde's decision. During the Herero Wars (1904–1908), Samuel Maharero attempted to rally Ovambo kings to fight against the Germans. An Ovaherero envoy sought Kambonde's assistance, but Finnish missionaries advised him to remain neutral. The only major act of resistance from Ondonga came from Nehale's attack on Fort Namutoni in January 1904.

=== Reunification of Ondonga and death ===
After Nehale's death on 14 April 1908, Kambonde reunified Ondonga, bringing the divided kingdom back under one rule. However, his reign lasted only one more year, as he died on 22 June 1909. He was succeeded by Kambonde III kaNgula.

Preceded by Iitana yaNekwiyu	Omukwaniilwa of Ondonga; 26 September 1884 – 22 June 1909	Succeeded by Kambonde III kaNgula
