= Onayena Constituency =

Electoral constituency in the Oshikoto region of northern Namibia

Onayena constituency (red) in the Oshikoto Region

Onayena Constituency is an electoral constituency in the Oshikoto Region of Namibia. The district capital is the settlement of Onayena.

The constituency's population has grown significantly over recent years, dominated by the Ovambo language speaking people and a small group of San people. It had 15,684 inhabitants in 2004 and 8,550 registered voters in 2020.

== Economy and infrastructure ==
The main economic activities in the constituency are agriculture and cattle rearing. Omahangu is the principal crop in Onayena, while cattle, goats and donkeys are the farming animals in the area. The constituency has important cultural and historical links. Onayena has a settlement prominent for investment opportunities and has a lot of large virgin land available housing and business investment.

== History ==
The Ondonga kings Shikongo shaKalulu and Nehale Mpingana lived and are buried here. The village of Omandongo where the first Finnish missionaries arrived in 1870, including Nakambale Martti Rautanen, is situated in Onayena.

== Politics ==
Onayena constituency is traditionally a stronghold of the South West Africa People's Organization (SWAPO) party. In the 2004 regional election SWAPO councillor Marx Nekongo was reelected with 5,481 of the 5,580 votes cast.

In the 2015 local and regional elections Mateus Nelumbu Kamati, a former SWAPO coordinator, won uncontested and became councillor after no opposition party nominated a candidate. Councillor Kamati was re-elected in the 2020 regional election. He received 2,987 votes, well ahead of Hileni Shinyamba of the Independent Patriots for Change (IPC), a party formed in August 2020, who obtained 651 votes.

== People from Onayena Constituency ==
Onayena is the hometown of many prominent people in Namibia, such as kwaito musician and producer The Dogg, and home to the first vice-president of Namibia, Nickey Iyambo.

== Schools in Onayena Constituency ==
- Nehale Senior Secondary School
- Joseph Simaneka Asino Secondary School
- Uuyoka Combined School
- Oniihwa Combined School
- Iikokola Combined School
- Matheus Nashandi Combined School
- Matheus Namwiha Primary School
- Ekaha Primary School
- Ambunda Primary School
- Onayena Primary School
- Onuuya Primary School
- Lucas Primary School
- Lano Primary School (private school)
- Ondumetana Primary School
- Oniiwe Primary School
- Nakambale Primary School
- Okakonda Primary School
- Elombe Combined School

New Beginning Private School LEMS Private School

== Churches in Onayena Constituency ==
- Onayena ELCIN Church
- Omulondo ELCIN Church
- Elombe ELCIN Church

== Villages in Onayena Constituency ==
- Oniiwe
- Ompugulu
- Oniimwandi
- Omandongo
- Uuyoka
- Onambeke
- Uukete
- Ethindi
- Enkolo
- Iikokola
- Oniihwa
- Okakwiyu
- Omadhiya
- Okambogo
- Okakololo Village
- Iihongo Village
- Uushinga
- Onamutene
- Onathinge
- Shimbobela
- Okaliveva
- Elombe

== See also ==
- Administrative divisions of Namibia
