= Phillemon Ndjambula =

Namibian politician

Phillemon Ndjambula born (5 September 1960) is a Namibian former Member of the National Council (Namibia) for Oshikoto Region in 1998 to 2010, he was also the first Regional Councillor for the Olukonda Constituency in 1992. Ndjambula attended Primary education at Onezizi Combined School and later on completed grade 12 at Andimba Toivo ya Toivo Senior Secondary School formerly (Oluno Secondary School) in 1975.

A member of SWAPO since 1975, Ndjambula received military trained at Tobias Hainyeko Training Centre in Angola around the year 1976. He was sent to study political science in the former Soviet Union (USSR) in 1981. He also completed a Diploma in Administration and Development Studies from the United Nations Institute for Namibia in Zambia from 1983–1986. He also studied political science at John Scher Party School in the German Democratic Republic (GDR) in 1986–1987) after independence in 1989 he was for a while the SWAPO Party Chief of Information and Mobilization Officer in Ondangwa.

== Recognition ==
Phillemon Ndjambula was conferred the Excellent Order of the Eagle, fifth Class on Heroes' Day 2014.
