= Upingtonia =

Former Boer republic in Namibia

Coordinates: 19°34′S 18°7′E

Republic of Lijdensrust Republiek Lydensrust
- 1885–1887
- Flag
- Status: Boer Republic
- Capital: Grootfontein
- Common languages: Dutch (written); Afrikaans (spoken); German
- Religion: Dutch Reformed
- President
  - 1885–1887: George Diederik P. Prinsloo
- History
  - Founding of Upingtonia: October 20 1885
  - Name change to Lijdensrust: 1886
  - William Worthington Jordan killed by Nehale Mpingana: 1886
  - Republic collapses: 1886
  - Merged into German South-West Africa: June 1887
- Currency: Pound sterling (£)
Preceded by	Succeeded by
Ovamboland	German South-West Africa
- Today part of: Namibia

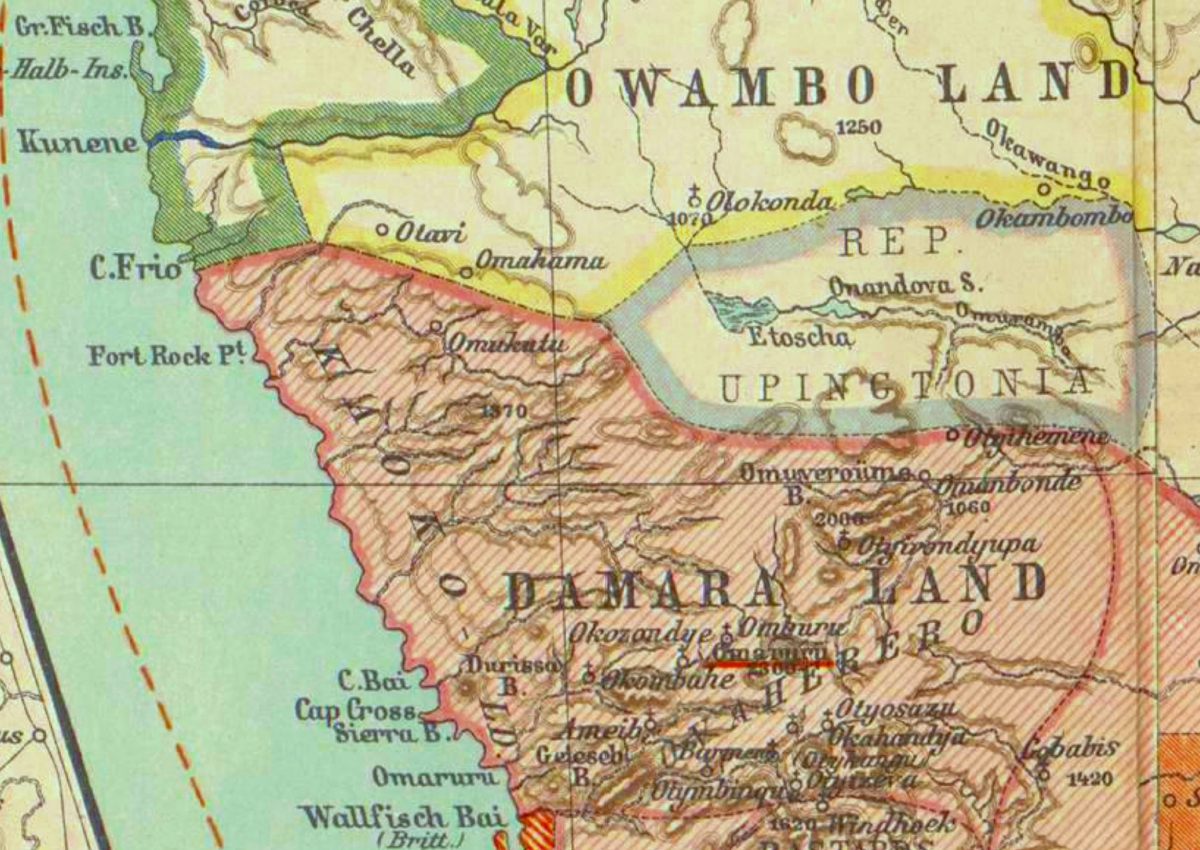
Map showing Lijdensrust edged grey

Lijdensrust, officially the Republic of Lijdensrust, was a short-lived Boer republic in the area of present-day Namibia. Declared on 20 October 1885, it was originally named Upingtonia, but changed its name soon after as the reason for its original name proved worthless. In 1887, it was merged into German South-West Africa.

== History ==
Between the years 1874 and 1880, farmers migrated from the Transvaal to what was then southern Angola. There, they came into conflict with the Portuguese colonial authorities, and some of their number decided to return to the Transvaal, while others migrated further south.

In 1885, William Worthington Jordan bought a tract (fifty thousand square kilometers) of land from the Ondonga chief Kambonde ka Mpingana for three hundred pounds, paid as twenty-five firearms, one salted horse, and a cask of brandy. This land stretched almost 170 kilometres (110 mi) from Okaukuejo in the west to Fischer's Pan in the east. Chief Kambonde relied on the help of Jordan to defeat his rival for power and brother, Nehale lya Mpingana.

Between 1876 and 1879, at the time of the Dorsland Trek, Boers had crossed the area, heading for Angola. In 1885 some of these trekkers returned and settled at Grootfontein on land given to them free of charge by Jordan. The Republic of Upingtonia was declared on 20 October 1885. At that time, the population of Upingtonia was around five hundred settlers. The state was named after Thomas Upington, prime minister of the Cape Colony, from whom the new state was hoping for support. However, little was forthcoming. In 1886, under the influence of the Boers returning to the Transvaal from southern Angola, the name was changed from Upingtonia to Lijdensrust or Lydensrust.

The short-lived republic's capital was Grootfontein, and its head of state was President George Diederik P. Prinsloo. The new state fought the Herero and became dependent on German protection. In 1886 Jordan was killed by Nehale ly Mpingana, and the republic collapsed. The next year the area it had covered was incorporated into German South-West Africa.
