= National House of Traditional Leaders =

Advisory Body

National House of Traditional and Khoi-San Leaders
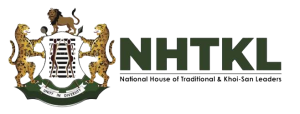

History
- Preceded by: National Council of Traditional Leaders

Structure
- Seats: 3 Eastern Cape; 3 Free State; 2 Gauteng; 3 Kwa-Zulu Natal; 3 Limpopo; 3 Mpumalanga; 3 Northern Cape; 3 North West
- Graph of the party split among 23 seats.
- Committees: List: Executive Committee; Committee of Chairpersons; Justice, Crime Prevention and Security Committee; Gender, Youth, Children, Aged, People with disabilities and LGBTQI communities, and Social Development committee; Internal Arrangements, Planning and Cooperative Governance Committee; Economic Development, Tourism and Minerals Resources Committee; Land, Agriculture and Rural Development Committee; Tradition, Heritage and Culture Committee

Constitution
- Constitution of South Africa, Chapter 12

Footnotes
- Source: DTA

The National House of Traditional Leaders is a statutory body of traditional leaders in South Africa, representing each of the eight Provincial Houses of Traditional Leaders. Until 1998 it was called the National Council of Traditional Leaders.

Its role includes advising the National government on matters relating to customary law.

== See also ==
- Ntlo ya Dikgosi of Botswana
- Council of Traditional Leaders of Namibia
- Senate of Lesotho
- Traditional leaders in South Africa
