= Shilongo =

Shilongo is a name of Namibian origin that may refer to:

- Shilongo Uukule (1919–2010), senior headman of the Uukwanambwa, a clan of the Ovambo people in Namibia
- Julius Shaambeni Shilongo Mnyika (1938–2003), Namibian guerrilla with the South West African Liberation Army (SWALA)
- Benson Shilongo (born 1992), Namibian footballer

A Nation or the People Shilongo origin from the Pride say. "EGONGA LYO SHILONGO" In oshiwambo. Spear of the Nation.

The Name Shilongo in owambo is the same as Sizwe is Zulu.

Spear or the Nation "Umkoto we Sizwe" Egonga lyo Shilongo.

Although the whole name should've been a statement saying the child is a Spear or the Nation. The child is called Shilongo in short.

Shilongo is masculine name given to boys
