= Andimba Toivo ya Toivo Senior Secondary School =

School in northern Namibia

Coordinates: 17.9259°S 15.992°E

- Ondangwa, Oshana Region; Namibia

Information
- Former name: Oluno Senior Secondary School (until 2004)
- Established: 1970s
- Teaching staff: c.40
- Grades: 8-12
- Enrollment: c.850

Andimba Toivo ya Toivo Senior Secondary School is a school in the Oshana Region of Namibia, in the suburb Oluno in Ondangwa town. It was established in the 1970s during South African occupation. The school's original name was Oluno Senior Secondary School. In 2004 it was renamed after Andimba Toivo ya Toivo, founder of SWAPO.

Its first principal was Mr Shilondelo, who was later succeeded by Mr Iita in the 1990s, Mr Mbeeli Wilbard in 2006 and Mr Shapaka Warde in 2011.

The school has grades from 8 to 12, with different fields of study in grade 12. The school has about 40 teachers and 850 learners.

== Alumni ==
- Phillemon Ndjambula, first regional councillor for the Olukonda Constituency, former member of the National Council
- Peya Mushelenga, member of cabinet since 2010

== See also ==
- Education in Namibia
- List of schools in Namibia
