= Blouwes =

- Settlement
- Location in Namibia
- Coordinates: 26°8′S 18°16′E
- Country: Namibia
- Region: ǁKaras Region

Population (2017)
  - Total: c. 300
- Time zone: UTC+2 (South African Standard Time)

Blouwes is a settlement of about 300 people in the ǁKaras Region of southern Namibia, located about 48 kilometres (30 mi) north-east of Keetmanshoop on the D3911 district road.

Blouwes is home to the Blouwes Traditional Authority, one of the 51 recognised traditional authorities in Namibia. The settlement is riddled with poverty and unemployment.
