= Okahao Constituency =

Electoral constituency in the Omusati region of northern Namibia

Coordinates: 17°53′S 15°6′E

Okahao Constituency (red) in the Omusati Region

Okahao Constituency is an electoral constituency in the Omusati Region of Namibia. It had 12,390 registered voters in 2020. Its district capital is the town of Okahao, the birth place of Namibia's founding president Sam Nujoma.

Okahao Constituency was created in 1998 from existing constituencies of Omusati, following a recommendation of the Second Delimitation Commission of Namibia, and in preparation of the 1998 general election. It covers an area of 9,910 km^{2} (3,830 sq mi). Okahao Constituency had a population of 17,548 in 2011, down from 17,751 in 2001.

== Villages ==
- Uutsathima, 80 kilometres (50 mi) away from Okahao. It is home to Uutsathima Combined School, a school predominantly for San people with 12 teachers and more than 300 pupils.

== Politics ==
Like all other constituencies in Omusati, Okahao constituency is traditionally a stronghold of the South West Africa People's Organization (SWAPO) party. The 2004 regional election was won by SWAPO politician Isai Paulus Kapenambili. He received 6,039 of the 6,104 votes cast.

In the 2015 local and regional elections SWAPO candidate Leonard Shikulo won uncontested and became councillor after no opposition party nominated a candidate. Councillor Shikulo (SWAPO) was reelected in the 2020 regional election. He obtained 4,694 votes, far ahead of the only opposition candidate, Erastus Shipopyeni of the Independent Patriots for Change (IPC, an opposition party formed in August 2020), who obtained 396 votes.
