= C. G. Tötterman =

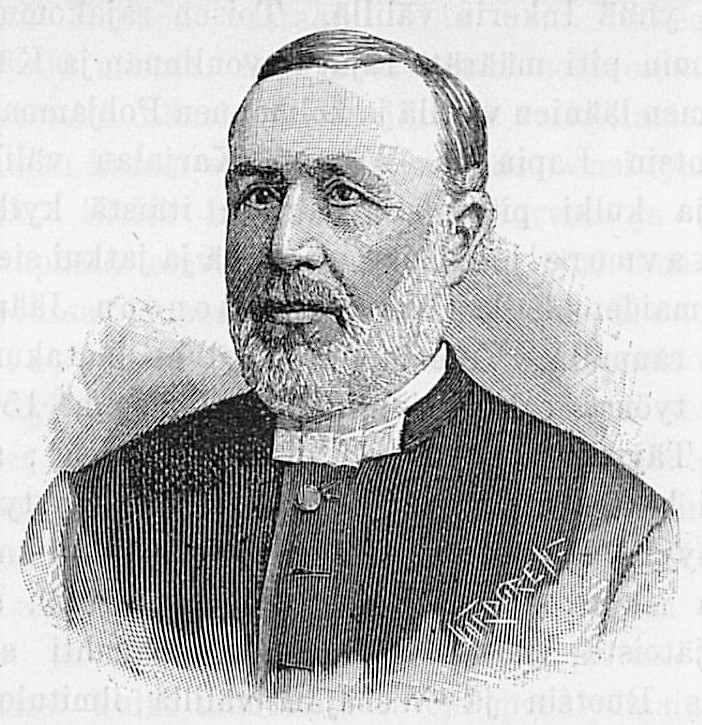
- Born: June 21, 1836; Pyhäjärvi Vpl., Finland
- Died: May 20, 1895 (aged 58); Helsinki
- Movement: Lutheran
- Spouse: Ida Lovisa Rancken

Carl Gustaf Tötterman (b. June 21, 1836 Pyhäjärvi Vpl., now Otradnoye, Priozersky District, Leningrad Oblast – May 20, 1895 Helsinki) was the second director of the Finnish Missionary Society, occupying this position from 1877 until his death in 1895.

== Background ==
C. G. Tötterman came from a family of clerics. His father was chaplain Claes Kristian Albert Tötterman, who worked as the acting vicar and chaplain of Pyhäjärvi (Viipuri Province) and later as chaplain of Joutsa. His mother was Gustava Fredrika Stenroth. He graduated from the Porvoo Gymnasium, and he was ordained a minister in 1860. In 1861 he married Ida Lovisa Rancken. They do not seem to have had children.

== Tenure in the Finnish Missionary Society ==
Tötterman was a member of board of the mission society from 1866 on. When K. J. G. Sirelius stepped down as the director, Tötterman was elected to this position, and Remes characterises him as "a true pioneer" in this work. However, in matters dealing with activities abroad, he was rather passive. The focus of his activities was improving the financial state of the mission society, which was necessary so that the mission society could carry on missionary work in Ovamboland in the same scale as before. The mission work in Ovamboland was initiated in 1870.

During the last decade of his life Tötterman was constantly ill. From the description given by Remes, it appears that he suffered from Parkinson's disease. He was also plagued by debts. In addition to being the mission director, he also filled a vacancy as chaplain of the railroads, so he actually had two full-time jobs. On May 14, 1895, he fell ill with pneumonia, of which he died six days later. Akseli Hirn was elected mission director after him.

== Sources ==
- Remes, Viljo (1993). Siemen kasvaa puuksi 1859–95 (Sata vuotta suomalaista lähetystyötä I:2). Helsinki: Suomen Lähetysseura.
- "Helsingin yliopiston ylioppilasmatrikkeli 1853–1899" (in Finnish). Helsinki University. 2003–2013.
