= Battle of Namutoni =

- Part of the Herero uprising
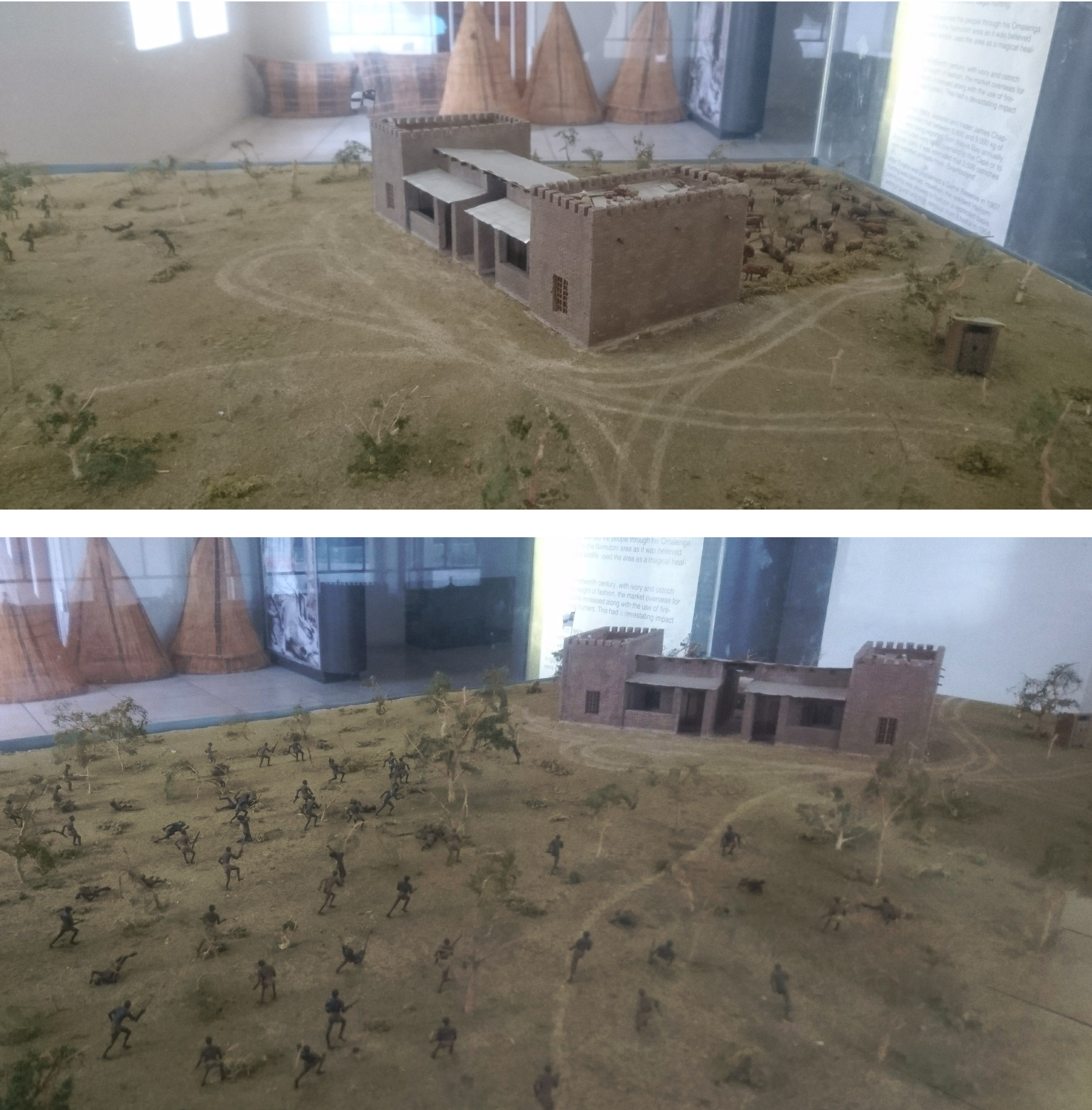
- A diorama of the fort during the battle at the Fort Namutoni museum.
Date	28 January 1904
Location	Namutoni, German South West Africa
Result	Fort Namutoni destroyed

Belligerents
Germany: German Southwest Africa	Odonga kingdom

Commanders and leaders
	King Nehale lyaMpingana

Strength
4 Schutztruppe regulars 3 colonial reservists	~500

Casualties and losses
None	68 killed 48 missing 20 wounded

The Battle of Namutoni fought between the Ondonga kingdoms and German South West Africa on 28 January 1904 was part of an uprising against German colonial expansion catalysed by the Herero uprising to the south that started a few weeks earlier. It was fought at the site of Fort Namutoni in northern Namibia.

The fort was held by four regular soldiers of the German Schutztruppe and three colonial reservists: Fritz Grossman NCO, Jakob Basendowski (NCO), Health Sergeant Bruno Lassmann and soldiers 1st Class Richard Lemke, Albert Lier, Franz Becker and Karl Hartmann. The fort was stocked with 1,500 rounds of ammunition. Chief Nehale Mpingana of the Ondonga people led the attack on the fort. Mpingana was noted for his strongly anti-colonial stance having successfully attacked the Dorsland Trek-Boers in 1886.

Continuous attacks on the fort by 500 Ondonga warriors lasted all day until slowing down in frequency as the day went on and eventually stopped in the afternoon. With only 150 rounds of ammunition remaining the defending Germans decided to retreat to the farm Sandhup 40 kilometres to the south on horseback during the night having incurred no casualties. The following morning the fort was sacked and destroyed by Ondonga forces claiming a number of cattle from the fort.

Following the battle the fort was rebuilt and greatly expanded by the Germans.
