= K. J. G. Sirelius =

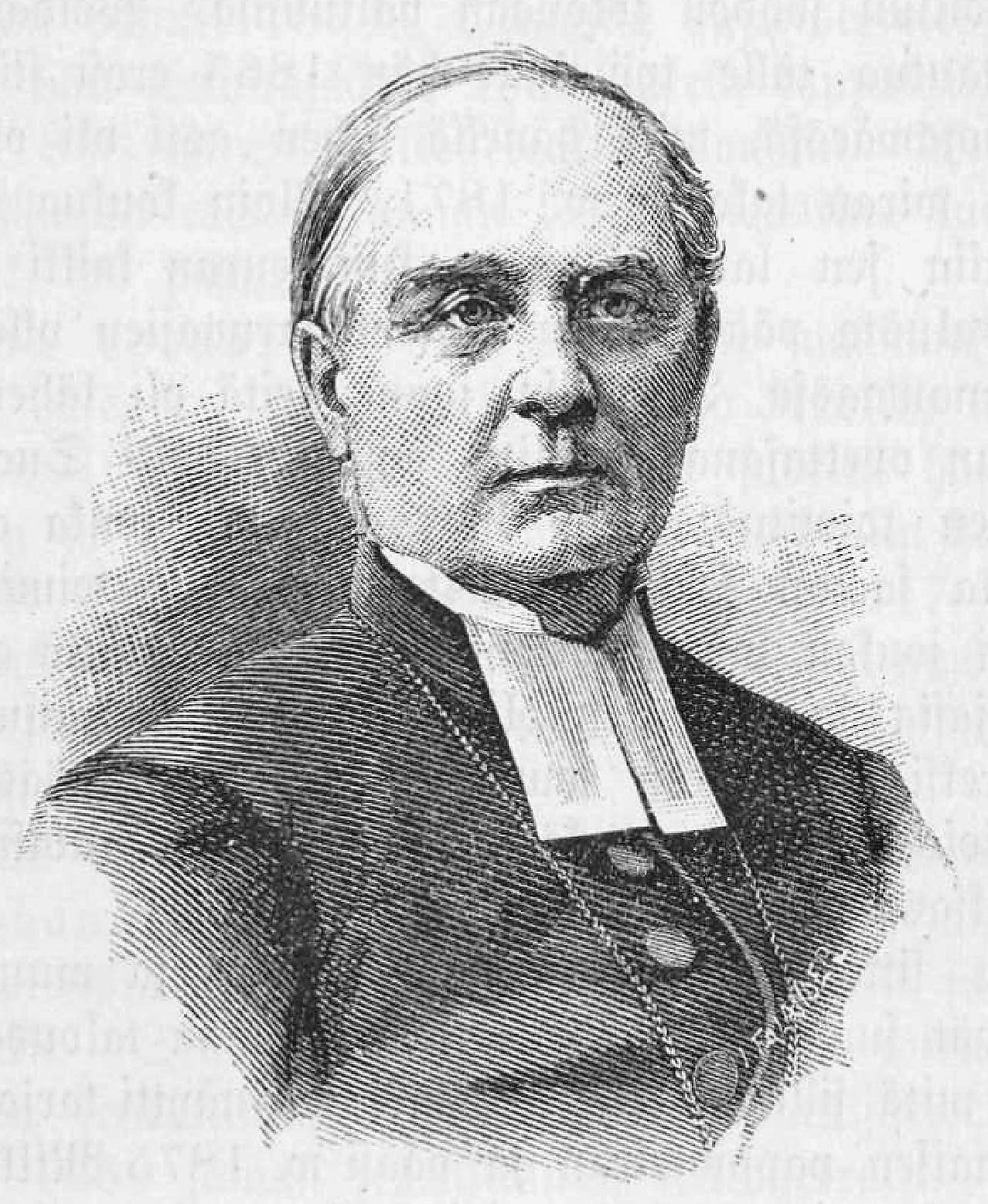
- Finnish Lifelong Learning Foundation ,1889
- Born: June 27, 1818; Kaavi, Finland
- Died: July 23, 1888 (aged 70); Mikkeli, Finland
- Occupation: Director of the Finnish Missionary Society
- Movement: Lutheran

Klemens Johan Gabriel Sirelius (June 27, 1818 in Kaavi, Finland – July 23, 1888 in Mikkeli, Finland) was the first director of the Finnish Missionary Society. He served in this position from 1872 to 1876. During his tenure the mission society was organised and the first missionaries were sent to Ovamboland in South West Africa. The last years of his life he served as the vicar of Mikkeli.

== Family background ==
The father of Sirelius was Arvid Johan Sirelius (1782–1838), who served as the chaplain of Nilsiä.

Sirelius went to school in Kuopio and Porvoo, and he graduated and entered the university in Helsinki in 1838.

Sirelius was ordained a minister in the Diocese of Borgå on June 19, 1847, and soon after this he completed the degree of Master of Arts. He then worked as a minister in Sortavala, Kronstadt and Saint Petersburg. Later he worked as the preacher of the Estonian and Latvian garrison parish in Helsinki during 1856–1865, and again from 1871 on.

== Career in the Finnish Missionary Society ==
Sirelius was elected secretary of the Finnish Missionary Society in 1859. He worked as the first teacher of the Helsinki Mission School from 1862 on, and during 1864–1872 he worked as the first director of the mission society. During Sirelius' tenure the mission society was organised, the mission school was founded, and the first missionaries were sent to Ovamboland. They arrived on July 8, 1870, to a place called Omandongo in Ovamboland. This became the first mission station there.

In the mid-1870s the mission society was already on a safe footing. However, Sirelius was no longer as energetic as he had earlier been, and his growing family needed a better income than what was possible in the mission society. Thus Sirelius decided to step down as the director. He was followed in this position by tuli C. G. Tötterman, who acted as the director during 1877–1895.

== After the mission society ==
Sirelius was appointed vicar of Mikkeli on August 20, 1875, but he only assumed this position on May 1, 1877. He was given the title of field provost in 1865, and the title of rural dean from 1879 on. He died in Mikkeli in July 1888.

== Private life ==
Sirelius was married twice. He first married Ines Sofia Waenerberg in 1863, but she died already in 1866. His second marriage was in 1870 to Hilda Johanna Bergholm (died 1906). He had one son from each marriage. The older son was Karl Johannes Sirelius (1864–1937), who became a chief treasurer, and the younger son was Arne Gabriel Sirelius (1876–1925), who later worked as town engineer in Kotka, Kuopio and Hanko.

== Sources ==
- Peltola, Matti (1958). Sata vuotta suomalaista lähetystyötä 1859–1959. II: Suomen Lähetysseuran Afrikan työn historia. Helsinki: Agricola-seura.
- Remes, Viljo (1993). Siemen kasvaa puuksi 1859–95 (Sata vuotta suomalaista lähetystyötä I:2). Helsinki: Suomen Lähetysseura.
- "Helsingin yliopiston ylioppilasmatrikkeli 1640–1852". Helsinki University. 2003–2013.
- "Helsingin yliopiston ylioppilasmatrikkeli 1853–1899". Helsinki University. 2003–2013.
