= Akseli Hirn =

Karl David Axel (Akseli) Hirn
- Born: October 18, 1845; Hauho, Finland
- Died: May 21, 1906 (aged 60); Saarijärvi, Finland
- Movement: Lutheran
- Spouse: Selma Erika Sofia Sylvin

Karl David Axel (Akseli) Hirn (October 18, 1845 – May 21, 1906) was a Finnish minister, and after C. G. Tötterman, the third mission director of the Finnish Missionary Society.

== Background ==
Hirn was born in Hauho, Finland, and came from a came from a family of clerics. His father was Daniel Kristian Hirn (1807–1884), assistant pastor of Hauho. His mother was Gustava Sofia Ulrika Alopaeus (died 1869).

Hirn went to school in the Porvoo Gymnasium. He graduated from the university with a degree in theology in 1870, and he was ordained a minister in 1871. He worked as a prison chaplain in Helsinki from 1884 on.

== Tenure as the mission director ==
Hirn worked as the director of the mission society for a short period, from 1895 to 1898. He was said to have been a "conscientious, deliberative and hard working director". He worked as the mission director beside his work as a prison chaplain.

During Hirn's tenure the mission society was given bad press, and also the relations to the Evangelical movement began to deteriorate. Members of this movement had earlier been among the most eager to support mission work, and the mission society and the Evangelical movement had held joint Mission and Gospel Feasts.

Setbacks in Ovamboland had the effect that the Lutheran Evangelical Association of Finland decided to begin mission work on its own, in Japan, the decision of which was taken in 1898. Also, there were no more joint mission feasts with the Finnish Missionary Society.

Donations to mission work increased during Hirn's tenure, however, as well as the circulation of mission magazines and the number of knitting societies for mission work.

Hirn was succeeded as the director of the FMS by Jooseppi Mustakallio.

== Work after the mission society ==
After his tenure in the mission society, Hirn worked from 1900 on as the vicar of Saarijärvi. He died while in this position in 1906.

== Private life ==
Hirn was married to Selma Erika Sofia Sylvin, who was originally from Sweden. It appears to be the case that they did not have children.

== Sources ==
- Peltola, Matti; Saarilahti, Toivo & Savolainen, Paavo (1959). Mestarin käskystä. Suomalaisen pakanalähetystyön historiaa. Helsinki: Agricola-seura. p. 73.
- Peltola, Matti (1958). Sata vuotta suomalaista lähetystyötä 1859–1959. II: Suomen Lähetysseuran Afrikan työn historia. Helsinki: Agricola-seura.
- Helsinki University (2003–2013). "Helsingin yliopiston ylioppilasmatrikkeli 1853–1899, HIRN Karl David Axel".
