= Mwadinomho Combined School =

School in Namibia

Coordinates: 17.6609°S 15.9467°E

Mwadinomho Combined School is a school in the Endola Constituency, in the Ongha circuit in Ohangwena Region in northern Namibia. It is situated in the settlement of Ondeihaluka, about 30 km (19 mi) north of Ondangwa, alongside the B1 main road from Ondangwa to Oshikango. Mwadinomho Combined is a combined school serving both primary and junior secondary grades.

The school was previously known as Ondeihaluka Combined School. In 2007 it was renamed after the Oukwanyama queen Martha Mwadinomho Kristian Nelumbu. Pupils at the school grow their own fruits and vegetables to supplement the food provided under the school feeding program.

Patrons of Mwadinomho Combined School are Helena Ndume, Naftal Hamata and Michael G Colvard. Colvard is an eye doctor from California in the United States who donated funds to the school.

== See also ==
- List of schools in Namibia
