= Lahja Lehtonen =

- Born: 3 August 1927; Helsinki, Finland
- Died: 19 August 2016 (aged 89); Helsinki, Finland
- Education: University of Helsinki
- Writing career
- Notable work: English-Ndonga Dictionary

Lahja Anna-Maija Lehtonen (3 August 1927 Helsinki, Finland – 19 August 2016 Helsinki, Finland) was a Finnish missionary who worked for a long time in Ovamboland, Namibia. She held a master's degree in the English language from the University of Helsinki, and she was known as the long time English teacher of the Oshigambo High School, which she co-founded together with Toivo Tirronen in 1960.

Lehtonen was born on 3 August 1927, in Helsinki, to Reverend Mauri Lehtonen and his wife Margit Lehtonen. The family moved quite often, and Lahja Lehtonen went to primary school in Jämsänkoski. Later the family settled in the Messukylä parish in Tampere. Lehtonen studied languages at Helsinki University, following in the footsteps of her mother.

Lehtonen's first term as a missionary in Ovamboland took place in 1954–58, and right from the start she worked at Oshigambo, teaching in the girls' school. After the Oshigambo High School had been founded, she taught there, and when Tirronen left for Finland in the mid-1970s, she took on the responsibilities of the principal. In 1977, her former student Timoteus Ndakunda became her vice principal. In 1980, they switched roles, and thereafter Lehtonen worked as the vice principal. In addition to working as a teacher, Lehtonen also wrote, together with Kirsti Ihamäki, a history book for Standard Three.

When the South African Defence Forces established a base only one-half kilometre (0.31 mi) from the school, Lehtonen protested strongly, and the base was moved to a new location two kilometres (1.2 mi) from the school. When Namibia gained its independence, Lehtonen was eligible to vote, and she was given the honour of casting the first vote at the Oshigambo polling station.

Lehtonen returned to Finland in 1991. In total, she worked in Ovamboland for more than 35 years.

Lehtonen wrote the histories of the school system in Ovamboland and of the Oshigambo High School, and she translated the biography of Martti Rautanen that had been written by Matti Peltola in 1994. The translation appeared in 2002. In 1996, she published an English-Ndonga Dictionary, which she prepared in collaboration with Eljas Suikkanen, basing the work on the Ndonga-English Dictionary of Toivo Tirronen. Lehtonen also wrote a history of Oshigambo, 1650 to 1950, in Oshindonga. After her retirement, Lehtonen became concerned about the fate of the Ovambo language, which was losing ground to the English language, and she strongly advocated the use of Oshiwambo.

The Ovambos gave Lehtonen the nickname Kanyeku. One explanation has it that it refers to a bird, but according to another explanation it comes from the verb nyekula "to turn suddenly, swing around, fling one's head or arm, whisk its tail", because when she started walking, she would always fling her head and arm simultaneously, but only once. This nickname has been inherited by all her namesakes, who are likewise called Kanyeku.

In an obituary published in Namibia, she was likened to a baobab tree that had now fallen.

== Works ==
- Oshigambo High School from 1960 to 1990. Oniipa: ELOC Printing Press. 1996. p. 60. ISBN 99916-33-49-9.
- English-Ndonga Dictionary (5000 ed.). Oniipa: ELCIN Printing Press. 1996. ISBN 99916-33-42-1.
- Ondjokonona yoosikola mOwambo 1870–1970 (2nd edition 2001 ed.). Helsinki: Helsinki University Printing House. 1998. pp. [18] 173. ISBN 99916-33-61-8.
- Schools in Ovamboland from 1870 to 1970 (2nd edition 1999 ed.). Helsinki: Finnish Evangelical Lutheran Mission. 1999. pp. 198 [18]. ISBN 951-624-256-1.
- Oshigambo from 1650 to 1950 (in Ndonga).
- Josef Auala, Apollos Kaulinge, Abisai Shejavali, Kirsti Ihamäki & Lahja Lehtonen (eds.) (1970). Ongerki yomOwambokavango — Ambo-Kavangon kirkko — The Ovambo-Kavango church. Helsinki: Finnish Missionary Society. pp. 32 (40 pages of photographs).

== Translation ==
- Peltola, Matti (2002). Nakambale: The Life of Dr. Martin Rautanen. Helsinki: Finnish Evangelical Lutheran Mission. p. 375. ISBN 951-624-298-7.
