= Council of Traditional Leaders =

The Council of Traditional Leaders is a national institution of the government of Namibia where the traditional leadership of Namibia is represented.

It was established by Act 13 of 1997 (GG 1706) and amended by Act 31 of 2000 (GG 2462). Pursuant to Article 102(5) of the Namibian Constitution, the council was established in order to advise the president of Namibia on the control and utilization of communal land and all such other matters as may be referred to it by the president for advice. It also handles activities on a traditional basis.

Members of the council are representatives of Traditional Authorities as designated and appointed. Every Traditional Authority may designate two representatives for appointment as members, who include the chief of that head of that traditional community as defined in section 1 of the Traditional Authorities Act, 2000; and one other person, being either a senior traditional councillor or a traditional councillor or any other member of that traditional community.

Responsibility lies with the Minister of Regional and Local Government and Housing. A member holds office for a period of five years and is eligible for re-appointment.

== See also ==
- National House of Traditional Leaders of South Africa
- Ntlo ya Dikgosi of Botswana
- Senate of Lesotho
