= Traditional leaders in South Africa =

Traditional leaders in South Africa represent the country's indigenous communities and act as custodians of cultural tradition and practice and customary law.

== Chapter Twelve of the Constitution ==
The Constitution recognises traditional leaders and allows for an act of Parliament to establish a national house of traditional leaders and/or a council of traditional leaders, and for an act of a provincial legislature to establish a provincial house of traditional leaders.

== Institutions by tier of Government ==
=== National House of Traditional and Khoi-San Leaders ===
The National House of Traditional and Khoi-San Leaders is a body of 23 traditional leaders in South Africa, representing the eight provincial Houses of Traditional Leaders. Until 1998 it was called the National Council of Traditional Leaders. It advises Parliament on issues related to customary law.

=== Provincial Houses of Traditional Leaders ===
There are provincial Houses of Traditional Leaders in every province except the Western Cape.

=== Local Houses of Traditional Leaders ===
By February 2008, 70% of local houses were established.

== Controversies ==
In 2010, 6 of the 13 kingships were converted to lower-level leaderships, because some of the kings were originally appointed by the white minority government with few legitimate claims to their thrones in order to "divide and rule."

The Constitutional Court ruled that it was unlawful for traditional authorities to collect levies on services. In 2023, the Constitutional Court ruled that Parliament had not facilitated public participation in passing the Traditional and Khoi-San Leadership Act 2019.
