= Onambango =

- Location in Namibia
- Country: Namibia
- Region: Oshikoto Region
- Time zone: UTC+2 (SAST)
- Climate: BSh

Onambango is a settlement in the Ondonga area of Oshana Region in Namibia near Ondangwa town. The village is the current seat of the Ondonga royal house during the reign of the King Fillemon Shuumbwa Nangolo.
