= Ondeihaluka =

Village in Ohangwena, Namibia

Ondeihaluka is a settlement in Ohangwena Region outside of Ondangwa. It is the home of the Mwadinomho Combined School.
