= Immanuel Kauluma Elifas =

Namibian traditional ruler (c. 1934–2019)

Omukwaniilwa of the Ondonga
- Reign: August 1975 – 26 March 2019
- Predecessor: Fillemon Elifas Shuumbwa
- Successor: Fillemon Shuumbwa Nangolo
- Born: 1 January 1934; Epale, South West Africa
- Died: 26 March 2019 (aged 85); Oshikoto Region, Namibia

Immanuel Kauluma Elifas (c. 1 January 1934 – 26 March 2019) was the omukwaniilwa (king) of the Ondonga, a sub-tribe of Owambo people since 28 August 1975, in Namibia. He succeeded his brother the late Chief Fillemon Elifas Shuumbwa, who was gunned down that same year at Onamagongwa. The Ondonga tribal area is situated around Namutoni on the eastern edge of Etosha pan in northern Namibia. Kauluma was also the Chairperson of the Council of Traditional Leaders for many years. He was succeeded as King by the designate Omukwaniilwa of Ondonga, his great-grandson Fillemon Shuumbwa Nangolo.

== Biography ==
Omukwaniilwa Kauluma was one of the longest serving leaders of the Ondonga kingdom, having ascended to the throne in August 1975. He served for 44 years as the king of Ondonga Kingdom; Nembungu lyAmutundu 1750 – ca. 1820 (Iinenge) was the last ruler to rule for 60 years. The Ondonga kingdom has been rocked by infighting linked to the succession battle in recent years.

Elifas named his nephew Fillemon Shuumbwa Nangolo as his successor in 2002 and confirmed to government again in June 2012. Nangolo's nomination was, however, disputed by the Ondonga royal family. This led to irreconcilable differences, which saw Elifas getting rid of some of his long-serving top aides, who have been backing Prince Nangolo as heir apparent. In July 2017, Elifas dismissed the late former Ondonga Traditional Authority (OTA) chairperson Peter Kauluma and former OTA spokesperson Joseph Asino. Heavyweights such as senior headman John Walenga and former Oshikoto governor Vilho Kamanya were also expelled from the traditional authority. Three other councillors - Kashona kaMalulu, Tonata Ngulu and Fillemon Nambili – were also dismissed.

The infighting turned nasty as the dismissed councillors turned to the courts and an order was granted in the Oshakati High Court compelling Elifas to give oral testimony. At the time, Elifas' legal team argued that the application to have the king testify was an attempt to test his mental capabilities in an open court. Several leaders, including head of state Hage Geingob and former president Sam Nujoma also tried to intervene in the impasse. At one point, Geingob summoned the factions to State House of Namibia and pleaded with the dismissed councillors to drop the court case so that the king would not be "paraded in court of law and embarrassed in front of his people". Shilongo Uukule was the king's senior advisor.

Elifas died at Onandjokwe Lutheran Hospital in Oshikoto Region on 26 March 2019.

== See also ==
- List of Ondonga kings
- Ndonga dialect
- Ovambo language

Preceded by Fillemon Elifas Shuumbwa	Omukwaniilwa of Ondonga; 16 August 1975–26 March 2019	Succeeded by Fillemon Shuumbwa Nangolo
