= Oshakati Senior Secondary School =

School in Oshana Region, northern Namibia

Information
- Established: 1973; 53 years ago
- Principal: Mr. Kamati

Oshakati Senior Secondary School is a school in Oshakati, Iipumbu yaShilongo street, in Oshana Region, northern Namibia. It was established in 1973 and has 34 classes. The principal is Mr. Kamati.

== See also ==
- List of schools in Namibia
- Education in Namibia
