= William Worthington Jordan =

South African hunter, trader and writer

- Born: 1849; Wynberg, Cape Colony, South Africa
- Died: 1886 (aged 36–37)
- Occupations: Hunter; trader; writer
- Known for: Establishing a trading post in Angola; involvement in the founding of Upingtonia

William Worthington Jordan (1849–1886) was a hunter, trader, and writer in Southern Africa.

Born at Wynberg in the Cape Colony, Jordan was of mixed race. He became a trader and hunter in what is now Botswana and Namibia. In 1880 he established a trading post in southern Angola.

Having bought a large area of land from the Ovambo people, Jordan donated some of it to Boer settlers who, in 1885, established the short-lived republic of Upingtonia. This did not long survive his death in 1886.

Jordan's Journal of the Trek Boers to Mossamedes appeared in the Cape Quarterly Review in 1881. In 1883, his From Damaraland to the Nhemba Country: Extract from the Diary of W. W. Jordan appeared in the same journal.
