= Genocide Remembrance Day =

Genocide Remembrance Day may refer to:

- Armenian Genocide Remembrance Day (24 April)
- Bengali Genocide Remembrance Day (25 March)
- International Holocaust Remembrance Day (27 January)
- Yom HaShoah (April or May)
- Nakba Day (15 May)
- National Day of Remembrance of the Victims of the Genocide of the Citizens of the Polish Republic Committed by Ukrainian Nationalists (11 July)
- Cambodian Genocide Remembrance Day (20 May)
- International Day of Reflection on the 1994 Rwanda Genocide (7 April)
- International Day of Reflection and Commemoration of the 1995 Genocide in Srebrenica (in Bosnia and Herzegovina) (11 July)
- Tamil Genocide Remembrance Day (18 May) (Mullivaikkal Remembrance Day)
- Kwibuka, marking the start of the annual official mourning period for the victims of the Rwandan genocide (7 April)
- Pontic Greek Genocide Remembrance Day (May 19)
- United Nations International Day of Commemoration and Dignity of the Victims of the Crime of Genocide and of the Prevention of this Crime (9 December)
- Holodomor Memorial Day (4th Saturday of November)
- Namibian Genocide Remembrance Day (28 May))

== See also ==
- European Day of Remembrance for Victims of Stalinism and Nazism
- Holocaust Memorial Days
- Mullivaikkal Remembrance Day, a day of remembrance which is observed by Sri Lankan Tamils in commemoration of the victims who died during the final stages of the Sri Lankan Civil War
