= Onamungundo =

- Settlement
- Location in Namibia
- Coordinates: 17°57′S 16°01′E
- Country: Namibia
- Region: Oshikoto Region
- Time zone: UTC+2 (SAST)
- Climate: BSh

Onamungundo is a settlement in the Ondonga area of Oshikoto Region in Namibia. The village was the seat of the Ondonga royal house during the reign of the late King Immanuel Kauluma Elifas.
