= Nehale lyaMpingana =

Omukwaniilwa of the Ondonga (c. 1850–1908)

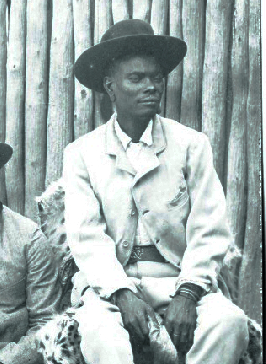

King of the Ondonga
- Reign: 26 September 1884 – 14 April 1908 (Disputed with Kambonde kaMpingana)
- Predecessor: Iitana yaNekwiyu
- Successor: Kambonde kaMpingana
- Born: c. 1850
- Died: 28 April 1908 (aged 57–58)

Nehale lyaMpingana, commonly also King Nehale, (c. 1850 – 14 April 1908) was the omukwaniilwa (king) of the Ondonga people, a subtribe of the Ovambo, in German South West Africa. Their tribal area is situated around Namutoni on the eastern edge of Etosha pan in today's northern Namibia.

He ruled the eastern part of Ondonga as a parallel king, having broken away from the authority of his older brother, King Kambonde kaMpingana, who ruled western Ondonga. His reign was marked by strong resistance to European colonial influence, particularly against the German and South African settlers. King Nehale is a National Hero of Namibia.

== Division of Ondonga ==
Following the death of Ondonga king Iitana yaNekwiyu, on 26 September 1884, a power struggle emerged over the Ondonga throne. Nehale's father, Mpingana yaShimbu, a key figure in Ondonga politics, played a decisive role in the succession dispute. Mpingana yaShimbu prevented Kambonde kIitope, the then-rightful heir, from succeeding Iitana yaNekwiyu, and instead pushed for his son, Kambonde kaMpingana, to become king.

Nehale refused to recognize Kambonde's rule, leading to an intense family conflict. To resolve the dispute, their parents assigned Nehale his own territory at Uutumbe, near the Oshamba seasonal river. However, Nehale rejected this location and instead settled at Oshitambi, declaring it as his own independent kingdom in 1885. He established his capital at Onayena and drew a border along the seasonal river. Ondonga was then divided into two separate kingdoms: eastern Ondonga, ruled by Nehale, and western Ondonga, ruled by Kambonde. The division remained in place throughout their reigns, with ongoing tensions and conflicts between them. When Nehale died on 14 April 1908, Kambonde reunified Ondonga, bringing the divided kingdom back under one rule and ending its division.

=== Anti-colonial resistance (1898–1904) ===
Under Mpingana's leadership the Ondonga fought and won two wars against intruders into their area. In 1886, Boer settlers on their Dorsland Trek were defeated after they—allegedly fraudulently—acquired land between Otavi and Grootfontein, and declared it to be the Republic of Upingtonia. Mpingana's men shot William Worthington Jordan, the leader of the trek. The group dispersed after the attack, with some settlers moving on towards Angola, and others turning back to the Transvaal.

In 1898, the German colonial administration convinced Kambonde to incorporate Ovamboland into its protectorate. Nehale, however, rejected German influence and sought military action. When the Herero Wars (1904–1908) erupted, the Germans built Fort Namutoni in Ondonga to monitor regional cattle movements. On 28 January 1904, 500 men under Mpingana attacked Imperial Germany's Schutztruppe at Fort Namutoni in the Battle of Namutoni. The 7 defenders of the fort fled under the cover of the night. Mpingana and his men confiscated horses and cattle and destroyed the outpost. This was one of the earliest military victories against German forces in Namibia, symbolizing fierce resistance against European colonization.

== Recognitions ==
- Nehale lyaMpingana is one of nine national heroes of Namibia that were identified at the inauguration of the country's Heroes' Acre near Windhoek. Founding president Sam Nujoma remarked in his inauguration speech on 26 August 2002 that:

Chief Nehale yaMpingana [fought] many battles against Afrikaner trekkers and German colonial forces in our people's resistance against colonialism and foreign invaders. [...] To his revolutionary spirit and his visionary memory we humbly offer our honor and respect.

- Nehale is honoured in form of a granite tombstone with his name engraved and his portrait plastered onto the slab.
- Chief Mpingana has numerous namesakes in Namibia, for instance Nehale Senior Secondary School in Oshikoto Region.
- Chief Nehale lyaMpingana Gate to Etosha
- Nehale lyaMpingana Constituency, an electoral constituency in the Oshikoto Region, was created and named in his honour in August 2013.

Preceded by Iitana yaNekwiyu	Omukwaniilwa of Ondonga; 26 September 1884–28 April 1908	Succeeded by Kambonde III kaNgula
