= Ongandjera =

Settlement in the Omusati Region of Namibia

Ongandjera (from "aagandji yiiyela", place of gold metal thread beads) is a tribal area near Okahao in the Omusati Region in northern Namibia. Ongandjera is the birthplace of Sam Nujoma, the country's first president, and of Pendukeni Iivula-Ithana who was the secretary-general of SWAPO from 2007 to 2012.

== Kingdom of Ongandjera ==
Historically part of Ovamboland, Ongandjera is the seat of a traditional kingship, the Ongandjera Traditional Authority. In 1917, South Africa stripped the rulers of seven kingships, including Ongandjera, of their authority to rule their territory. Nevertheless, the position of King of the Ongandjera was continued. Following Namibia's independence, the king of Ongandjera declared the royal family restored.

List of rulers:

Before 1948:

- King Niilwa
- King Nangombe ya Mangundu
- King Amatundu ga Nima
- King Niita yIitula
- King Nandigolo uIitula
- King Nuunyango uIitula
- King Nkandi kAmwaama
- King Nangombe
- King Namatsi
- King Amunyela gwIileka
- King Asino
- King Amwaama
- King Tshaanika tsha Tshiimi
- King Namatsi
- King Nalukale
- King Namutenya
- King Amunyela gwa Tshaningwa (1858–1862)
- King Ekandjo lya Kadhila (1862)
- Queen Nakashwa (1862)
- King Tsheya tsUutshona (1862–1878)
- King Iiyambo yIileka (1878–1887)
- King Tshaanika Tsha Natshilongo (1887–1930)
- King Sheya shaAmukwa (1930–1936)
- King Tshaanika shIipinge (1936–1948)

1948 to present:

- King Uushona wa Shiimi (1948–1971)
- King Japhet Malenga Munkundi (1971–2012)
- King Johannes Mupiya (since 2012)
