= Fillemon Elifas Shuumbwa =

Fillemon Elifas Shuumbwa (October 10, 1932 – August 16, 1975) was the omukwaniilwa (or chief) of Ondonga and chief minister of Ovamboland (1972–75). The Ondonga tribal area is situated around Namutoni on the eastern edge of Etosha pan in today's northern Namibia. He was assassinated in 1975 at Onamagongwa and buried in Olikondo.

Preceded by	Omukwaniilwa of Ondonga; 1972–16 August 1975	Succeeded by Immanuel Kauluma Elifas
