= Olukonda Constituency =

Electoral constituency in the Oshikoto region of northern Namibia

Coordinates: 17°59′S 16°01′E

Olukonda constituency (red) in the Oshikoto Region

Olukonda Constituency is an electoral constituency in the Oshikoto Region of Namibia. It had 9,094 inhabitants in 2004 and 7,495 registered voters in 2020. The district capital is the settlement of Olukonda.

== Politics ==
Olukonda constituency is traditionally a stronghold of the South West Africa People's Organization (SWAPO) party.

=== Regional elections ===
In the 2004 regional election SWAPO candidate Phillemon Ndjambula received 4,005 of the 4,050 votes cast.

In the 2015 local and regional elections the SWAPO candidate won uncontested and became councillor after no opposition party nominated a candidate. The SWAPO candidate also won the 2020 regional election. Phillemon Ndjambula received 2,409 votes, ahead of Jakob Nakaleke of the Independent Patriots for Change (IPC), an opposition party formed in August 2020, with 1,353 votes.

=== National elections ===
In the 2009 general election, incumbent president and SWAPO candidate Hifikepunye Pohamba received 89% of the votes for president.

== See also ==
- Administrative divisions of Namibia
