= Olukonda =

- Settlement
- Location in Namibia
- Coordinates: 17.9833°S 16.0167°E
- Country: Namibia
- Region: Oshikoto Region
- Constituency: Olukonda
- Time zone: UTC+2 (SAST)
- Climate: BSh

Olukonda is a settlement in the Oshikoto Region in the north of Namibia. It is the district capital of the Olukonda electoral constituency. During colonial time of German South West Africa the missionary station and settlement was known as the Capital of the North.

Olukonda has been the place of the first missionary station to the Ovambo people, founded in 1870 by Finnish missionaries. In the 1880s Martti Rautanen, nicknamed Nakambale, became missionary at Olukonda and initiated the building of a church in 1889, and a missionary house in 1893. Both the church and the mission station buildings are still existent and have been declared National Monuments of Namibia in 1992. Together they are now known as the Olukonda National Monument. The missionary station houses the Nakambale Museum, and the church, although not anymore in regular use, is infrequently utilised for wedding ceremonies. Rautanen and his family are buried nearby. There is a rest camp close to the National Monument, financed by the Government of Finland.

Apart from tourism, economic activity in the area is dominated by subsistence farming, particularly Mahangu.

Olukonda is the birthplace of Namibia's fourth president Nangolo Mbumba.
