= Ontananga =

Village in Namibia

Coordinates: 18°00′48″S 16°03′38″E

Ontananga is a village in the Oshikoto Region in northern Namibia. It is under the traditional rule of the Ondonga Traditional Authority.
