= Ovambo people =

Bantu ethnic group in Namibia

Ovambo
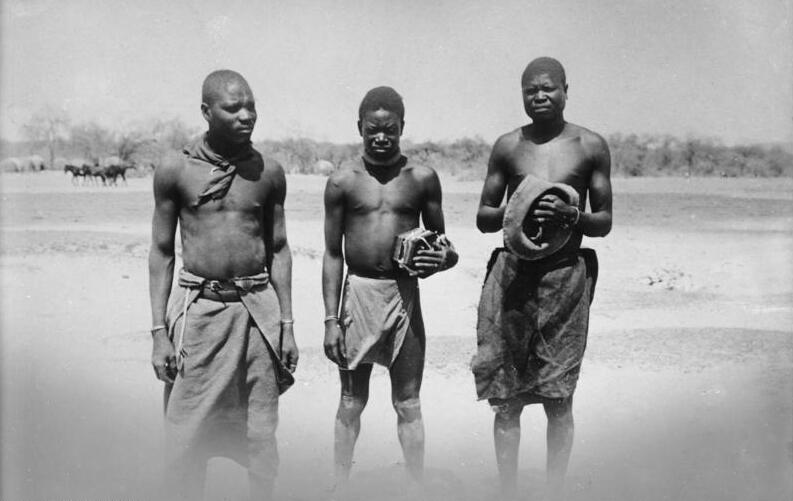
- Ovambo men in the early 20th century

Total population
- ~2.2 million

Regions with significant populations
- Namibia: 1,523,239 (50.4% of Namibia population)
- Angola: 650,000

Languages
- Ovambo, English, Portuguese

Religion
- Lutheranism, Traditional religion

Related ethnic groups
- Ovimbundu, Herero and other Bantu peoples

Ovambo
- Person: Omuwambo
- People: Ovambo
- Language: Oshiwambo
- Country: Ovamboland

The Ovambo people (pronounced [ovambo]), also called Aawambo, Ambo, Aawambo (Ndonga, Nghandjera, Kwambi, Kwaluudhi, Kolonghadhi, Mbalantu, Mbandja), or Ovawambo (Kwanyama), are a Bantu ethnic group native to Southern Africa, primarily modern Namibia. They are the single largest ethnic group in Namibia, accounting for about half of the population. Despite concerted efforts from Christian missionaries to wipe out what they believed to be 'pagan practices', the Ovambo have retained many aspects of their traditional cultural practices. They are also found in the southern Angolan province of Cunene, where they are more commonly referred to as "Ambo".

The Ovambo consist of a number of kindred Bantu ethnic tribes who inhabit what was formerly called Ovamboland. In Angola, they are a minority, accounting for about two percent of the total Angolan population.

In the early 21st century, the Ovambo ethnic group numbered about 2 million people. They are predominantly of the Lutheran (97%) and traditional faiths (3%), the former having followed conversion by German missionaries.

== Demographics ==
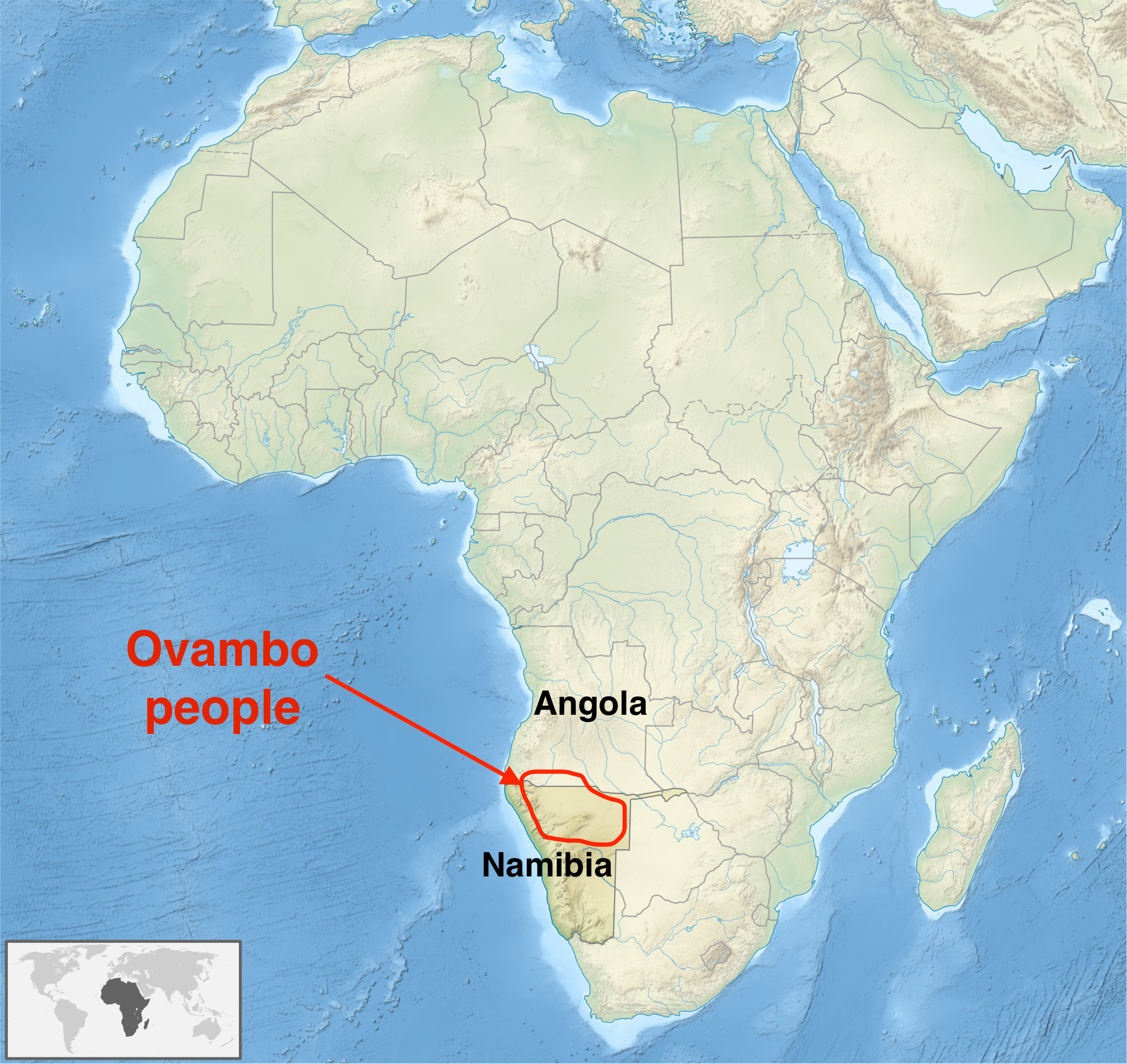
Ovambo people distribution (approx).

The Ovambo people reside in the flat sandy grassy plains of north Namibia and the Cunene Province in southwestern Angola, sometimes referred to as Ovamboland. These plains are generally flat, without many stones, and located at a high altitude.

Water courses, known as oshanas, irrigate the area. In the northern regions of Ovamboland, tropical vegetation is sustained by abundant but seasonal rainfall that floods the region, creating temporary lakes and islands. In dry season, these pools of water disappear. The Ovambo have adapted to the widely varying seasonal weather patterns with their housing, agriculture, and livestock practices.

The Ovambo people are a Bantu-speaking group. In Namibia, other Bantu speakers are the AaNdonga, Ovakwanyama, Aakwambi, Aangandjera, Aambalantu, Ovaunda, Aakolonkadhi, Aakwaluudhi and Aambandja. In Angola, they are the Ovakwanyama, Aakafima, Evale and Aandonga. The Ovakwanyama are the largest sub-tribe.

== History ==
The Ovambo started migrating to their current location around the 14th century from the Zambia region to the northeast. They initially settled near the current Angola-Namibia border, and expanded further south into Namibia in the 17th century. They have a close cultural, linguistic and historical relationship to the Herero people, who are found in more southern parts of Namibia, and the Kavango people to their east, who settled around the Okavango River.

In contrast to most ethnic groups in Africa, the Ovambo people were largely unaffected by Swahili-Arab and European traders before the 19th century. They were relatively isolated and had a low-density, pastoral and nomadic lifestyle.

When Germany established a colony in Namibia in 1884, they left the Ovambo people undisturbed. The Germans focused on the southern and coastal regions which were better for resources and trading.

After World War I and the victory of the Allies, the South African government annexed Namibia into the Union of South Africa. It was known as the Territory of South West Africa. This brought major changes. The South Africans introduced large plantations, cattle ranching, and mining operations to Ovamboland.

In 1915, Portugal launched a violent campaign in the Angolan territories of the Ovambo people. The Portuguese forces terrorized the local populations, massacring them, burning down villages and aggravating famine. A 2026 study described this campaign as a genocide.

The Portuguese colonial administration in Angola, who had previously focused on their coastal, northern and eastern operations, entered southern Angola to form a border to defend against the expanding South African presence. The Ovambo people launched several armed rebellions against South African rule in the 1920s and 1930s, which were all suppressed by the Union Defence Force.

The South African administration in Namibia continued the so-called "Police Zone" in the south. This region had been created by the Germans with a veterinary Red Line that defined the southern two-thirds of the province that later became Namibia.

The Ovambo were not allowed to move into the Police Zone, neither could other tribes nor Europeans move north without permits. This isolated the Ovambo people, who benefitted by the Germans and later colonizers preserving their traditional authorities to work with. In addition, the number of European or White farmers in the north was reduced.

But, because of a labor shortage in the Police Zone and South Africa, in part because of the massacre of native Africans through such actions as the Herero and Nama genocide (1907-1908), the South African government allowed migrant wage labor. Numerous Ovambo people traveled south to work as migrant laborers in such South African towns as Cape Town and in the Police Zone. They were constrained by racial segregation and lived under highly restricted human rights.

In 1948, with a change in government after World War II, South Africa introduced Apartheid rule to the Ovamboland.

The South African government declared the Ovamboland an independent province in 1973. But they appointed chiefs who were aligned with the South African government's policies. The Ovambo people rejected these developments. In 1975 the appointed chief minister of Ovamboland was assassinated. Other armed confrontations took place. In conjunction with the armed SWAPO movement, Namibia and its Ovambo people gained independence from South Africa in 1990.

== Religion ==
=== Traditional religion ===
Today the traditional religion of the Ovambo people is held by less than 3%. In the 21st century, most residents in Namibia state Christianity as their primary faith.

The Ovambo traditional religion envisions a supreme being named Kalunga; rites and rituals are centered around sacred fire. This is similar to religious traditions of many ethnic groups in southwestern Africa. The Kalunga cosmology states that the Supreme Being created the first man and first woman, who had a daughter and two sons. It is the daughter's lineage that created the Ovambo people. Their traditional beliefs are expressed through their matrilineal kinship system.

The rituals involve elaborate fire making and keeping ceremonies, a rain making dance, and the use of herbs and smoke. Certain rites include throwing herbs in the fire and inhaling the rising smoke. The head priest traditionally was the king of a tribe. His role in part was to attend to the supernatural spirits and be the chief representative of the Ovambo tribe to the deities.

=== Christianity ===
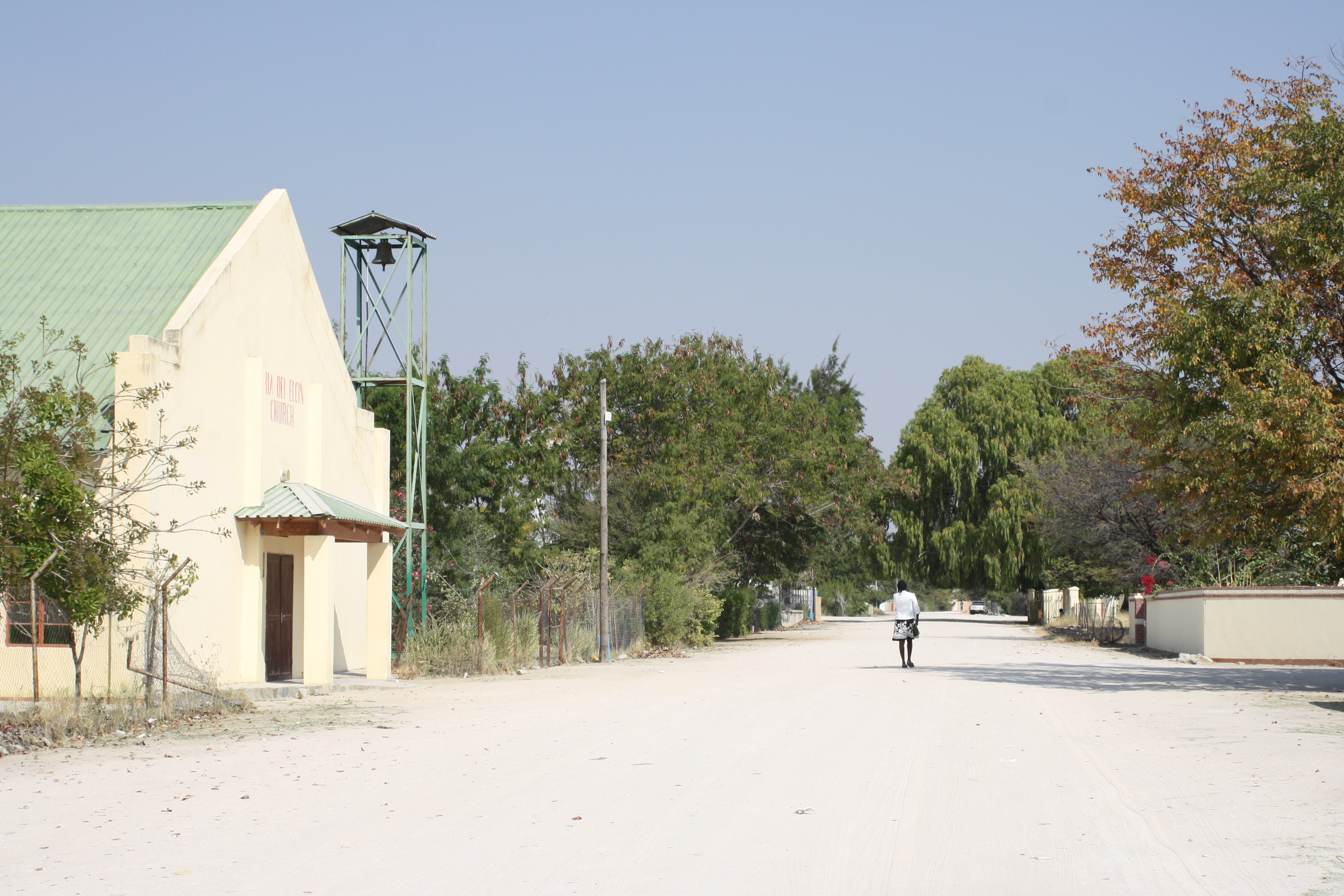
A Lutheran church in Ongwediva.

Christianity was introduced to the Ovambo people in the late 19th century. The first Finnish missionaries arrived in Ovamboland in the 1870s. They were Lutheran and influenced the conversion of Ovambo people to that Protestant faith. The Finnish missions influenced both religion and cultural practices. For example, the typical dress style of contemporary Ovambo women, which includes a head scarf and loose full-length maxi, was derived from those of the 19th-century Finnish missionaries.

The Ovambo now predominantly follow Christian theology, prayer rituals and festivities. Some traditional religious practices have continued, such as the use of ritual sacred fire. They also invoke their supreme creator Kalunga. Thus, the Ovamba have adopted a syncretic form of Christianity.

Most weddings, for instance, feature a combination of Christian beliefs and Ovambo traditions. Their traditional dancing is done to drumming (Oshiwambo folk music).

== Society and culture ==
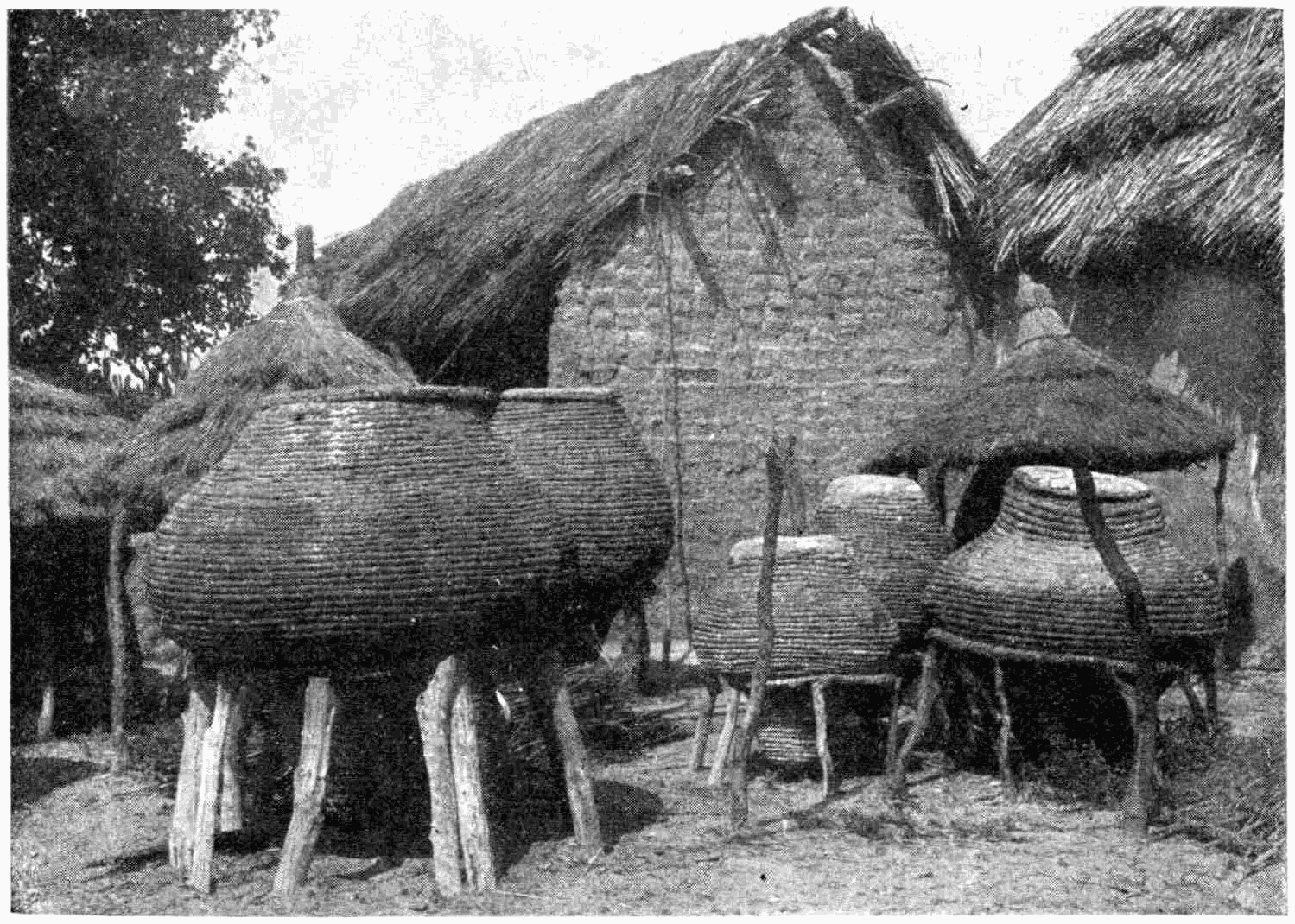
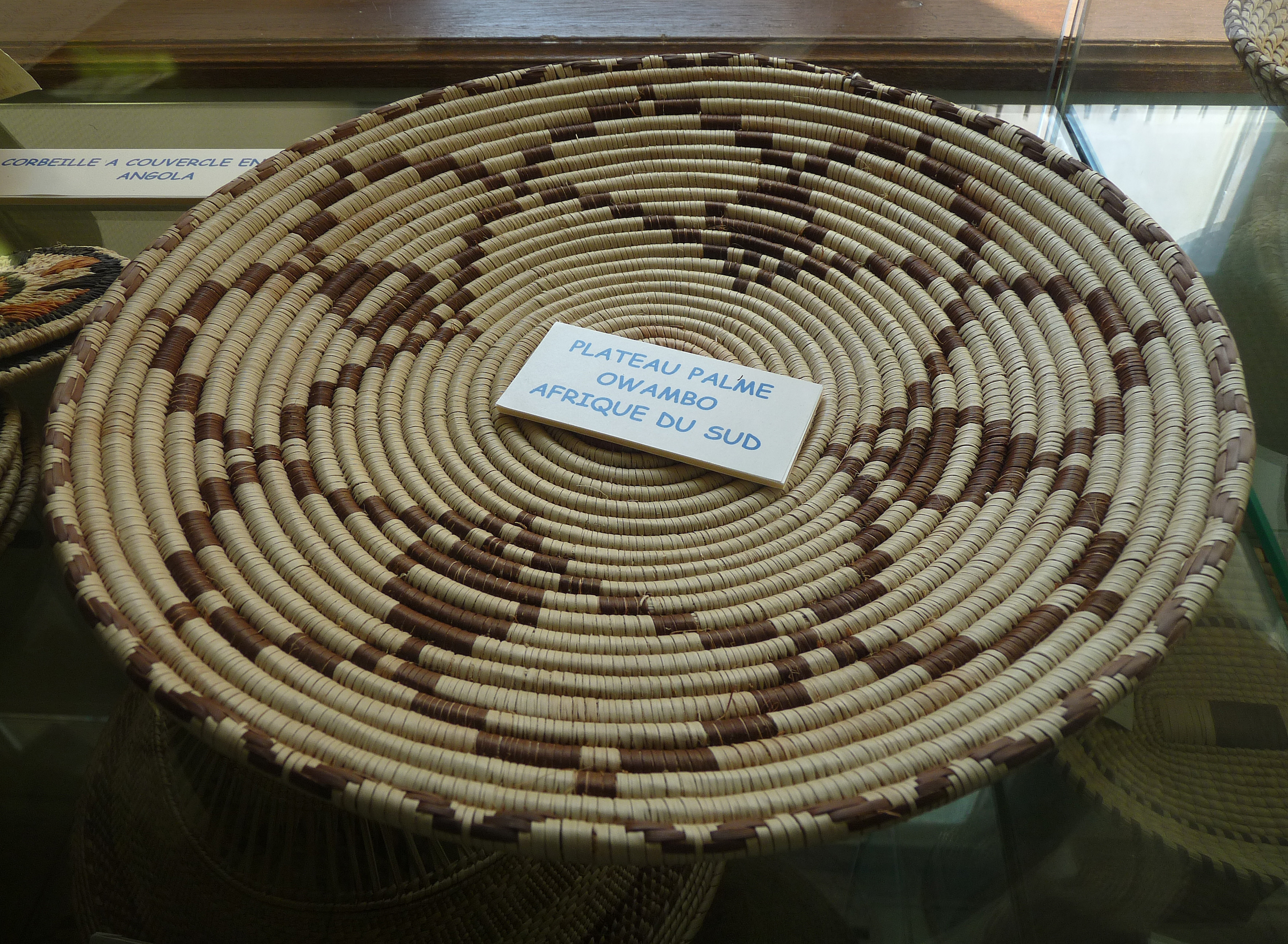
Huts of the Ovambo people, and their artwork (right).

The traditional home is a complex of huts surrounded by a fence of large vertical poles linked by two horizontal poles on each side. The complex is a maze with two gates but it is easy to get lost within the homestead. Each hut generally has a different purpose, such as a Ondjugo (the woman of the homestead's hut) or Epata (kitchen area).

The Ovambo people lead a settled life, relying mostly on a combination of agriculture and animal husbandry. The staple crops have been millet and sorghum (iilyavala), and beans (omakunde) are another popular crop. In drier regions or seasons, pastoral activity with herds of cattle (eengobe/eenghwandabi), goats (iikombo/onakamela) and sheep (eedi) becomes more important. The animal husbandry is not for meat (ombelela), but primarily as a source of milk (omashini). Their food is supplemented by hunting, fishing, and gathering.

During the colonial era, the Ovambo were active in elephant (eenjaba) hunting for their tusks to supply the ivory demand, and they nearly hunted the elephants in their region to extinction.

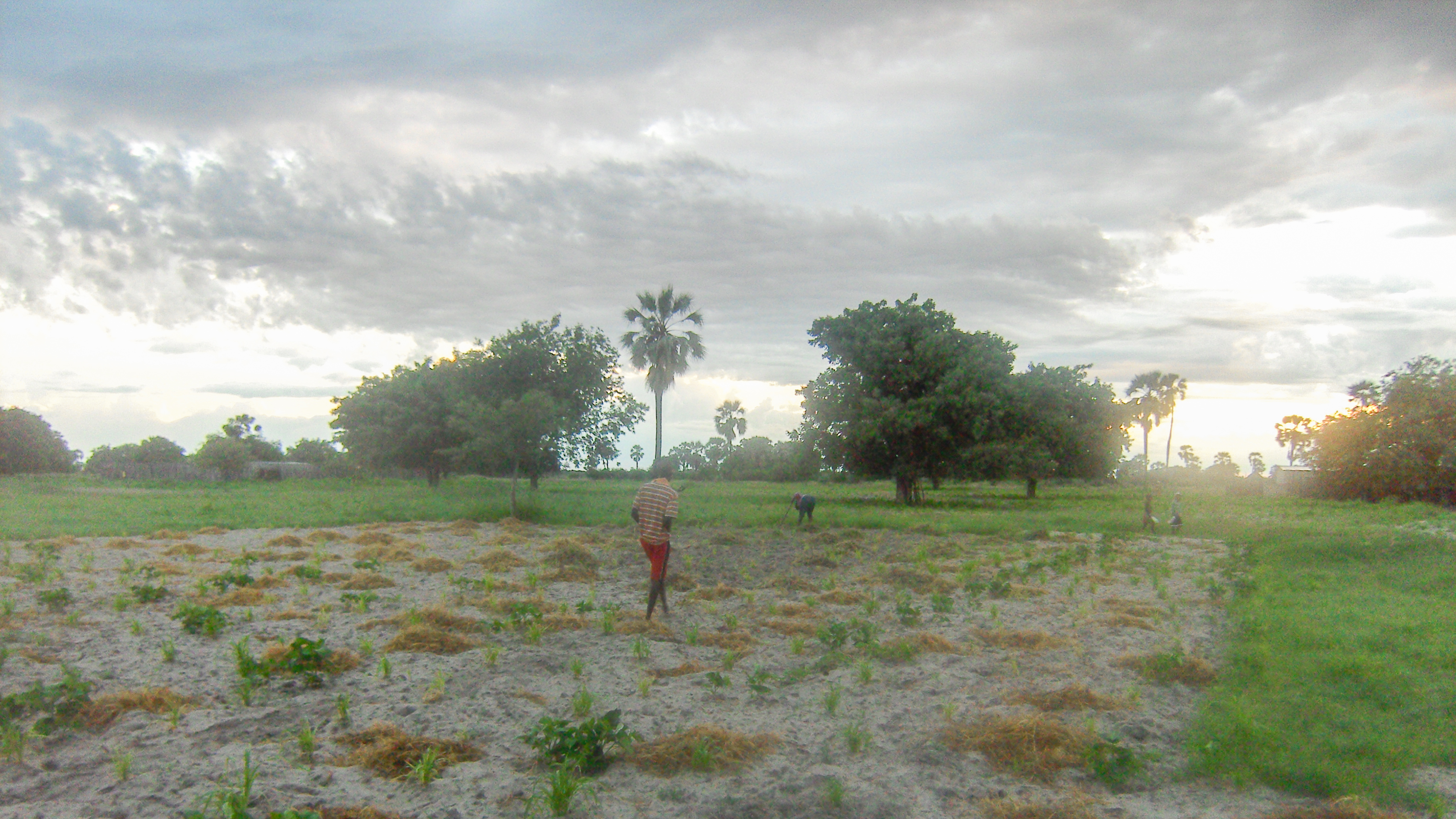
Grasslands in rural Ovamboland.

Each Ovambo tribe had a hereditary chief who is responsible for the tribe. Many tribes adapted representation by having a council of headmen who run tribal affairs. Members of the royal family of the Owamboland are known as aakwanekamba, ovakwaluvala, ovakwamalanga, ovakwaanime, aakwanyoka and many more; only those who belong to this family by birth, through the maternal line, have a claim to chieftainship. The tribes figure their descent by a matrilineal kinship system, with hereditary chiefs arising from the daughter's children, not the son's. Polygyny is accepted, with the first wife recognized as the senior.

Ovambo brew a traditional liquor called ombike. It is distilled from fermented fruit mash and particularly popular in rural areas. The fruit to produce ombike are collected from makalani palms (Hyphaene petersiana), jackal berries (Diospyros mespiliformis), buffalo thorns (Ziziphus mucronata), bird plumes and cluster figs (Ficus racemosa). Ombike, with additives like sugar, is also brewed and consumed in urban areas. This liquor is then called omangelengele; it is more potent and sometimes poisonous. New Era, a Namibian English-language daily newspaper, reported that clothes, shoes, and tyres have been found to have been brewed as ingredients of omangelengele.

== Ovambo clans ==
The following table contains the names, areas, dialect names and the locations of the Ovambo according to T. E. Tirronen's Ndonga-English Dictionary. The table also contains information concerning the classification of noun class of the Proto-Bantu language for these words.

| Area | Clan | Dialect | Location |
|---|---|---|---|
| Classes 9 (*ny > on-), 11 (uu-/ou-) | Class 2 (*wa-, a-) | Class 7 (*ki > oshi-) | |
| O-ndonga | Aa-ndonga | Oshi-ndonga | Southern Ovamboland |
| Uu-kwambi | Aa-kwambi | Oshi-kwambi | Central Ovamboland Oshakati |
| O-ngadjera | Aa-ngandjera | Oshi-ngandjera | Central Ovamboland |
| Uu-kwaluudhi | Aa-kwaluudhi | Oshi-kwaluudhi | Western Ovamboland |
| O-mbalanhu | Aa-mbalanhu | Oshi-mbalanhu | Western Ovamboland |
| Uu-kolonkadhi | Aa-kolonkadhi | Oshi-kolonkadhi | Western Ovamboland |
| Ou-kwanyama | Ova-kwanyama | Oshi-kwanyama | Northern and Eastern Ovamboland, Southern Angola |
| E-unda | Ova-unda | Oshi-unda | Western Ovamboland, Epalela vicinity |
| O-mbadja | Ova-mbadja | Oshi-mbadja | Southern Angola, Shangalala region |

== See also ==
Flag of Ovamboland

- Herero people
- Himba people
- Nama people
- Oorlam people
