= Ondonga =

Traditional kingdom in northern Namibia

Ondonga is a traditional kingdom of the Ovambo people in what is today northern Namibia. Its capital is Ondangwa, and the kingdom's palace is at Onambango. Its people call themselves Aandonga. They speak the Ndonga dialect. The Ondonga kingdom is ruled by an Omukwaniilwa (king), assisted by a council of elders, the Ondonga Traditional Authority. After the death of king Immanuel Kauluma Elifas in March 2019, Fillemon Shuumbwa Nangolo was appointed as successor and subsequently recognised by government.

== Succession rules ==
The king's succession is matrilinear. Both king and queen are to marry outside the royal family. The first in line to the throne is the oldest surviving brother of the king, then followed by his sisters' sons. If there are several such nephews, the royal family and selected elders of the kingdom make a recommendation. However, succession is this way is not automatic, and ultimately decided by the traditional authority, over which the king presides. If for instance the first in line is not considered capable, someone else might be recommended.

There are two matrilinear lines in the Ondonga kingdom, one from Epale and one from Onethika. Under normal circumstances ascension alternates between the two.

The king's residence is not at a predetermined village and depends on where the king chooses to reside. The past two kings resided at Onamungundo, previous places of the royal palace of the Aandonga included Oshamba, Olukonda, Okaloko, Ondjumba, Ontananga and Omwandi.
