= Reverend Juuso Shikongo Senior Secondary School =

Rev. Juuso Shikongo Secondary School
- Omuntele Constituency; Namibia

Information
- Type: Secondary School
- Established: 2012
- School district: Omuntele
- Grades: 8–12

Reverend Juuso Shikongo Senior Secondary School is a Namibian public school in the Omuntele Constituency in the Oshikoto Region about 60 kilometres southeast of Ondangwa, which was in 2013 inaugurated by then Education Minister Dr David Namwandi. The school is named after the founder of the Evangelical Lutheran Church in Namibia 's Omuntele congregation, Reverend Juuso Shikongo, the school started operating from a sister school, Uukule Senior Secondary School situated at Onyaanya Constituency some 30 kilometres away, in 2011 before moving to Omuntele at the beginning of the year 2013. In his official inauguration address, the education minister David Namwandi pointed out that Government has spent N$120 million (Namibian Dollars) on the construction of classrooms, offices and hostels for the school.

== See also ==
- Education in Namibia
- List of schools in Namibia
