= Nehale lyaMpingana Constituency =

Electoral constituency in the Oshikoto region of northern Namibia

Nehale lyaMpingana constituency (red) in the Oshikoto Region

Nehale lyaMpingana Constituency is an electoral constituency in the Oshikoto Region of Namibia, named after Nehale lya Mpingana, one of Namibia's National Heroes. It was created in August 2013, following a recommendation of the Fourth Delimitation Commission of Namibia, and in preparation of the 2014 general election. The constituency office of Nehale lyaMpingana is in Omboto, 120 Kilometers east of Omuthiya in an extremely remote area. As of 2020 the constituency had 5,879 registered voters.

The constituency borders the constituencies of Guinas, Omuthiyagwiipundi Constituency, Eengodi, and Okankolo.

== Politics ==
Nehale lyaMpingana constituency is traditionally a stronghold of the South West Africa People's Organization (SWAPO) party.

In the 2015 local and regional elections the SWAPO candidate won uncontested and became councillor after no opposition party nominated a candidate. The SWAPO candidate also won the 2020 regional election. Josef Shilongo received 2,245 votes, well ahead of Vilho Mwapopi of the Independent Patriots for Change (IPC), an opposition party formed in August 2020, with 189 votes.

== See also ==
- Administrative divisions of Namibia
