= Shikongo =

Shikongo is a surname of Namibian origin that may refer to:

- Ananias Shikongo (born 1986), Paralympian athlete from Namibia
- Ben Shikongo (born 2000), Namibian cricketer
- Joseph Shikongo (born 1964), Namibian police officer
- Juuso Shikongo (1917–1991), South West African anti-apartheid activist
- Matheus Shikongo (1950–2021), Namibian politician and businessman
- Whitney Shikongo (born 1995), Angolan model and beauty pageant titleholder
- Wilbard Shikongo (born 1957), retired Namibian military officer
