= Onkumbula =

Onkumbula is a settlement in the Oshikoto Region of northern Namibia. It is situated on the district road D3603 c. halfway between Ondangwa and Okongo and belongs to the Okankolo electoral constituency. The village has a community hall and a police station. Unemployment is high in this settlement, particularly among the youth.
