= Sisa Namandje =

Namibian Lawyer

- Born: December 15, 1972 (age 53); Onyaanya, Oshikoto Region
- Occupation: Lawyer
- Website: sisanamandjeinc.com

Sisa Namandje (born 1972) is a Namibian lawyer prominent for representing high profile Namibian figures. He has represented all three Namibian presidents Sam Nujoma, Hifikepunye Pohamba and Hage Geingob.

== Early life and education ==
Namandje was born on 15 December 1972 at Onyaanya in the Oshikoto Region of northern Namibia. He spent his primary school years in northern Namibia before the family moved to Zambian exile, where he attended school at SWAPO's health education centre in Nyango. After Namibian independence he returned to Onyaanya and attended Uukule Senior Secondary School. He graduated 1994 at the age of 21.

In 1995 Namandje moved to Windhoek and worked at Windhoek Central Prison. A year later he quit and began his law studies at the University of Namibia. He graduated in 2000 with B.Juris and LLB degrees and joined the Namibian Defence Force where he rose to lieutenant colonel. In 2001 he served his articles as a candidate attorney at Nate Ndauendapo & Associates.

== Legal career ==
Namandje rose to prominence between 2003 - 2005 during the trials of high-profile public figures' cases, such as that of Jack Huang. In 2012, he was appointed Chief Electoral Officer at the SWAPO Party electoral conference, a position he was re-appointed to in 2017. His law firm, Namandje Incorporated, has produced more than 50 Namibian lawyers since its inception.

In May 2020, he was involved in a legal battle with the Law Society of Namibia over his trust accounts.

== Public image ==
Namandje is implicated as a central actor involved in the Fishrot Files corruption scandal. Namandje is accused of using his law firm’s trust account to launder money for several people, including prominent politicians implicated in the Fishrot scandal. Al Jazeera’s investigation Anatomy of a Bribe identified transfers worth $17.5 million Namibian dollars ($1.5m), which were paid from Fishcor to Namandje’s law firm’s accounts. According to an investigator from Namibia’s Anti-Corruption Commission, this money was then paid into accounts linked to the SWAPO party. Namandje later recruited the daughter of Anti-Corruption Commission (ACC) director general Paulus Noa, the man who investigated him over the laundering of N$23 million, which was allegedly stolen from the government. Namandje admitted to disbursing funds on behalf of the ruling Swapo party to various entities and individuals, such as payments to Arma Amukiyu of N$5,2 million, and N$1.4 million to Lemon Tree (a company whose beneficial owner is the wife of the late President Geingob, Monica Geingos.

Namandje first rose to prominence in the Namibia legal system in 2007 when he represented two Chinese nationals who were accused of smuggling ivory out of Namibia. Since then, he was the first Namibian to appear on Masters of Success on MTC Namibia which discusses the success of prominent African people. Additionally, he has represented politicians SWAPO Party Youth League secretary and president Paulus Kapia in his corruption trial. In 2019, he represented Namibian education minister Katrina Hanse-Himarwa in her trial after she was accused of using her office as governor of Hardap Region to award houses to her relatives.

In 2014, it was reported that three people in Outapi had been scammed by individuals who claimed to be, or to represent the name of, Sisa Namandje. In a statement issued by his legal firm, Namandje warned against individuals using his name for personal gain and that if such individuals would be prosecuted.

Namandje has expressed the need for changes in the Namibian judicial system. Saying at a Masters of Success event in 2015 that if given a chance, he would represent land activist Job Amupanda, as he believed there was a need to protect the interests of poor Namibians.

== Personal life ==
Sisa is the first of 12 children of Simon and Ruusa Namandje. He is married to Lovisa Namandje with whom he has two children. He lives in Windhoek.
