= Amakali Combined School =

Location
- Onyaanya Constituency; Namibia

Information
- Type: Junior secondary school
- Established: 1976
- School district: Onyaanya
- Faculty: Commerce, Science, Natural science and Social studies
- Grades: 1–10
- Color(s): White, blue & black

Amakali Combined School is a public school in Onyaanya, Oshikoto Region, Namibia. It is one of the top performing schools in Namibia, and Oshikoto Region in particular.

== See also ==
- List of schools in Namibia
- Education in Namibia
