= Omeyantalala =

- Location in Namibia
- Coordinates: 17°57′32″S 16°42′12″E
- Country: Namibia
- Region: Oshikoto Region
- Time zone: UTC+1

Omeyantalala is a village in the northern part of Namibia, in the Oshikoto Region about 28 km from the center of Okankolo constituency, stretching out well over 20 km from the main road. The village is in the Ondonga kingdom and under the leadership of Headman Tate Ananias. Many of the village's inhabitants are commercial farmers farming with small livestock and mahangu as a farm crop. The village has about 54 households.

== Etymology ==
The name Omeyantalala means "cold water"; the village name was derived from a long pan covering 4 km and it holds rainwater for the livestock and for human use during dry seasons. The pan was and is still used as water point for farmers going to look for graze-land in the far north side of Kavango.

== Economics and development ==
Omeyantalala have a primary school which was established in 2004 by Mr Martin Shigwedha as a school principal and other two teacher Meme Vicky Kashungu and Tate Keresa. Omeyantalala now has a school from grade one to grade eight.

When the missionaries came to Namibia,, Omeyantalala built a church out of corrugated iron, which is still used to this day. There are few shops in Omeyantalala only catering for basic needs but sometimes turn to be very expensive, and because the villagers are lower income earners and cannot afford expensive basic goods. There is also a mobile clinic that assist with simple health issues.

== Challenges ==
- Proper school infrastructures for conducive learning environment.
- Distance from the gravel, 20 km on sandy road is an obstacle to development in the village because people cannot reach the village to bring about development.
- need for water
