= Sacky =

Sacky may refer to:

- Sacky Nangula, councillor of Omuntele Constituency, Namibia
- Sacky Shanghala, Attorney General of Namibia since 2015
- nickname of William Glen (footballer) (1903–1981), Irish footballer
