= Kaiyamo =

Kaiyamo is a surname. Notable people with the surname include:

- Elia Kaiyamo (born 1951), Namibian politician
- Nico Kaiyamo (born 1961), Namibian politician and businessman
