= Alfred Angula =

Namibian trade unionist

Alfred Angula (born 7 September 1965 in Tsumeb, Oshikoto Region) - died 31 December 2024 was a Namibian trade unionist. In 2000, he was named the head of the Namibian Farm Workers Union (NAFWU). He became active in the trade union movement prior to independence in 1988.

== Education ==
Angula earned a diploma in education from the University of Cape Town and matriculated at the Otjikoto Secondary School.

== Expropriations ==
In June 2004, as head of the Farmworkers Union, Angula raised the possibility of Zimbabwe-style land expropriation, saying:

If the white colleagues do not want expropriation of land, we can always introduce a new method - which is taking the land without compensation and without sharing it with them, by force.

== See also ==
- Land reform in Namibia
