= Henock Kankoshi =

Namibian politician (born 1965)

Henock Tangeni Kankoshi (born 19 September 1965), is a Namibian politician. He served as governor of Oshikoto Region, succeeding Penda Ya Ndakolo in 2015. When his term ended in April 2020, Ya Ndakolo became Oshikoto governor again.

Kankoshi was born in Onyaanya Constituency and went to school in Ondangwa. He attended Ongwediva College of Education between 1984 and 1985 and became a teacher. In 2004 Kankoshi was elected regional councillor for the Onyaanya Constituency. He was subsequently selected to represent the region in the National Council.

Kankoshi has been active in SWAPO since before independence. He served as the party's regional coordinator in the Oshikoto Region from 2002 to 2004, and he served on the party's central committee. Kankoshi also wrote a novel, Ampundja ya Kula Nahe Ambambi Ya Putuka Nayina which was published locally.
