= Namibian Defence Force Training Establishment =

- Type: Military academy
- Established: 1979
- Affiliations: Namibian Defence Force
- Commandant: Brigadier General Thomas Showa
- Location: Okahandja, Namibia
- Campus: Okahandja
- Colors: Brown, gold

The Namibian Defence Force Training Establishment is a training unit of the Namibian Defence Force. It is the premier training institution of the Namibian military and offers a variety of training ranging from basic military training to vocational training. It was previously known as Military School Okahandja. The Training Establishment Consists of Seven Schools, all commanded by Officers of the rank of Colonel or its equivalents.

== History ==
The Training Establishment traces its roots back to the Namibian Liberation struggle when the forerunner to today's Training Establishment was established in late 1979 as the "SWA Military School" by the South West African Territorial Force during the South African administration of Namibia. The Training Establishment is the primary training unit of the force. It is based at the Osona Military base outside Okahandja. It is the NDF training institution that offers the six-month basic military training (BMT) to all recruits wanting a career in the Namibian Defence Force. The school also conducts training for all officer cadets in the force.

== Units ==
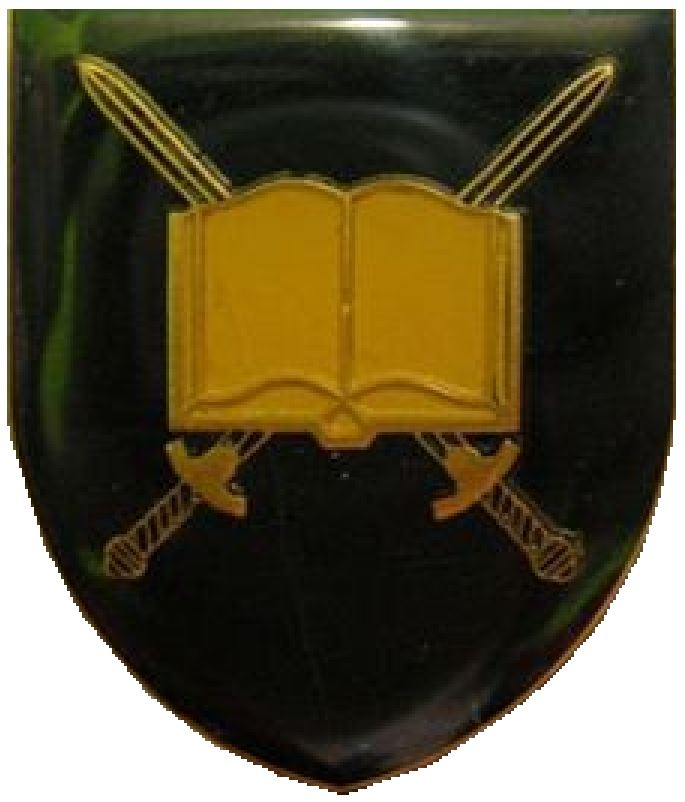
SWATF era logo

The Training Establishment offers and hosts seven different Schools for military training.

=== Medical Training School ===
A Medical training facility is part of the Training Establishment.

=== School of Logistics ===
A school of Logistics has been setup at the Training Establishment.

=== School of Intelligence ===
A school of Intelligence has been setup at the Training Establishment.

=== School of Signals ===
Formerly a wing, the School of Signals trains military communications specialists. Signals courses offered include Communication Course, Signal Officers Course and Computer Courses.

=== Military Discipline Training School ===
As the primary training institution, basic military training for all NDF recruits is undertaken at the Osona military base outside Okahandja. Basic training for recruits is nine months long, and is offered in two phases, Basic Military Training and Platoon Weapons.

Some of the military aspects covered include drills, field craft, skill at arms, minor tactics, coin ops, military hygiene, military law, military aspects, first aid, map reading, law of armed conflict and conventional warfare.

=== Vocational Training School ===
Set up with German assistance, the facility consists of training workshops for plumbing, carpentry, welding, electricity and bricklaying artisans. The central support unit aims to capacitance the military when it deploys on peace support operations.
Trades include:

- Automotive Engineering
- Metal Fabrication
- Electrical General
- Air-conditioning & Refrigeration
- Bricklaying and Plastering
- General Construction
- Manufacturing (Carpentry)

== Commandants ==
Namibia Military School
From	Commandant	To	Ribbon
Unknown date	Col Malakia Nakanduungileh	10 April 2002	
10 April 2002	Col Mwetufa Mupopiwa	unknown datw	
Unknown date	Brigadier General Joseph Kakoto	18 April 2011	
18 April 2011	Brigadier General Fredrick Siluzungila	1 April 2014	
1 April 2014	Brigadier General Wilbard Shikongo	27 February 2017	
27 February 2017	Brigadier General Joshua Namhindo	2018	
2018	Brigadier General Kashindi Eusebi Kashindi	unknown date	
unknown date	Brigadier General Thomas Showa	incumbent	
From	Formation Sergeant Major	To	Ribbon
2010	WO1 Albert Siyaya	2011	
