= Uukule Senior Secondary School =

Secondary school in Namibia

Information
- Established: 1990; 35 years ago

Uukule Senior Secondary School is situated in the northern part of Namibia in the Onyaanya Constituency of the Oshikoto Region. Uukule was established and officially opened in 1990 after the independence of Namibia. The school was named after Senior Headman Uukule waAmulungu, father of Nehoya Andreas, king of Ondonga.

== Notable alumni ==
- Sisa Namandje, prominent lawyer, graduated in 1994

== See also ==
- List of schools in Namibia
- Education in Namibia
