= Johannes Nakwafila =

Namibian politician

Johannes Kamati Nakwafila (born 28 August 1957 in Ohangwena Region) is a Namibian politician. A teacher by profession, he has been a member of the National Council of Namibia since 2004 and Regional Councillor for Epembe Constituency since 1999.

== Education and career ==
Nakwafila is a graduate of Ongwediva High School in 1977 and Ongwediva College of Education in 1979. As from 1980 to 1992, Nakwafila worked as a teacher and administrator at Epembe Combined School, Nehale Senior Secondary School including as principal of Omishe Junior Primary School in 1992. He joined politics and served in the Ohangwena Regional Council from 1992 to 1998; Ohangwena Regional Council Management Committee 1999–2004; he was the SWAPO Party District Coordinator from 1993 to 1998 also a member of the third National Council Member for Ohangwena Region 2004–2010; and again for the fourth National Council Member for Ohangwena Region from 2010 to 2015. Nakwafila has served as the SWAPO Party Councillor for Epembe Constituency since 1999; Standing Committee on Public Accounts and Economy 2005–2010; Vice-Chairperson for the Standing Committee on Public Accounts and Economy from 2011 to 2015.
