= Lake Guinas =

Sinkhole lake in Namibia

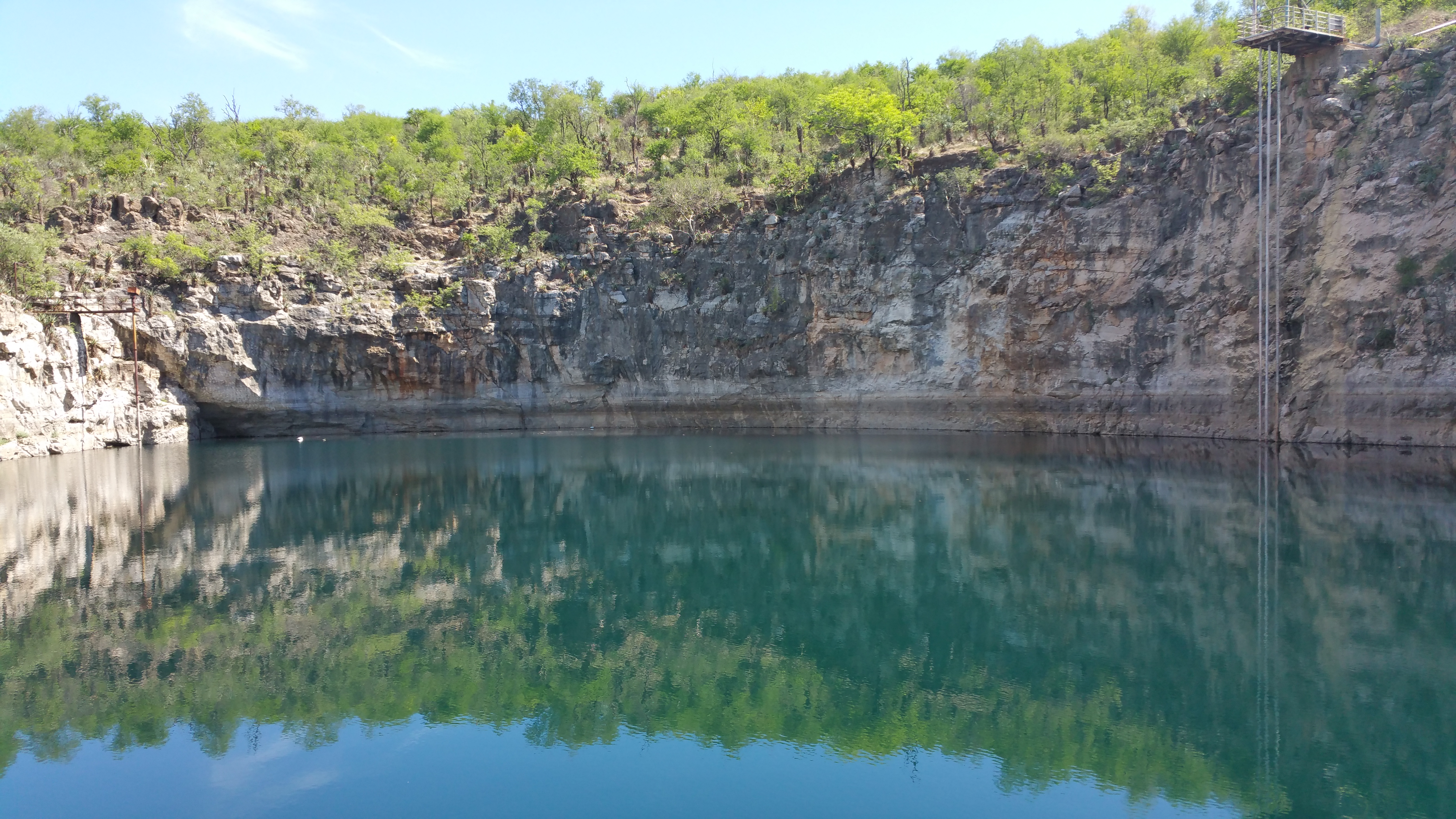

- Location within Namibia
- Coordinates: 19°13′59″S 17°21′10″E
- Basin countries: Namibia
- Surface area: 0.66 ha (1.6 acres)
- Average depth: 105 m (344 ft)
- Max. depth: 130 m (430 ft)
- Water volume: 693,000 m^{3} (562 acre⋅ft)
- Surface elevation: 1,250 m (4,100 ft)

Lake Guinas is the larger of only two permanent natural lakes in Namibia. It is a sinkhole lake, created by a collapsing karst cave, located thirty-eight kilometres west of Tsumeb, near the D3043 road.

Lake Guinas is home to Tilapia guinasana, a critically endangered species of cichlid fish, endemic to this lake, but at some stage introduced to Guinas' sister lake, Lake Otjikoto, as well as into a few farm dams nearby. The claim that lake Guinas is indeed connected to lake Otjikoto by caves is frequently made but not proven as yet.

The lake is situated on private farmland but can be visited with the permission of the owner. The lake and its underwater caverns were surveyed in 2019 by the Sunfish autonomous underwater vehicle.

== Extent ==
The lake is about 300 metres (1,000 ft) long and 175 metres (575 ft) wide near the bottom, with a maximum depth of 133 metres (435 ft).

== See also ==
- Dragon's Breath Cave – Cave in the Otjozondjupa Region of Namibia
- Harasib Cave – Flooded karst cave in Namibia
- Lake Otjikoto – Lake and national monument in Namibia
