= Angelina Immanuel =

Namibian youth activist (born 1992)

- Born: Ondangwa, Northern Namibia
- Education: Bachelor of Education
- Alma mater: University of Namibia
- Occupations: Teacher; Youth Activist
- Known for: Youth Advocacy

Angelina Ndinouange Immanuel (born 1992) is a Namibian youth activist and educator. She first rose to national attention after the decision to challenge the ruling SWAPO Party in the Ondangwa elections. The decision led to condemnation from members of the party, among them Prime Minister Saara Kuugongelwa.

== Early life ==
Immanuel was born in 1992 in Northern Namibia. She attained her primary education at Ondangwa in the early 2000s before moving on to graduate with a degree from the University of Namibia in 2014.

== Political career ==
During the period of the #FeesMustFall movement and the student demands for free education in South Africa, Angelina began to involve in activities of the UNAM SRC while she studied at the University of Namibia.

In 2019, when President Hage Geingob promoted a councillor from the Ondangwa town council to the position of governor, Angelina announced her decision to run for political office "to represent the voices of the youth and the people of Ondangwa".

Following her decision to challenge the ruling party, some members of SWAPO accused her of being an independent candidate of the Affirmative Repositioning movement. Other factions claimed she in fact belonged to SWAPO Party itself. However, she dismissed the reports as "malicious" and a means to derail from participating in democratic elections.

Immanuel lost the 2019 Ondangwa town council race to SWAPO candidate Leonard Negonga. The Namibian reported that Immanuel received 37% of the vote share, while Negonga captured 51%.
