= Tsumeb =

Tsumeb: Otjiherero: Okavisume; Khoekhoe: ǂAixorobes
- Town
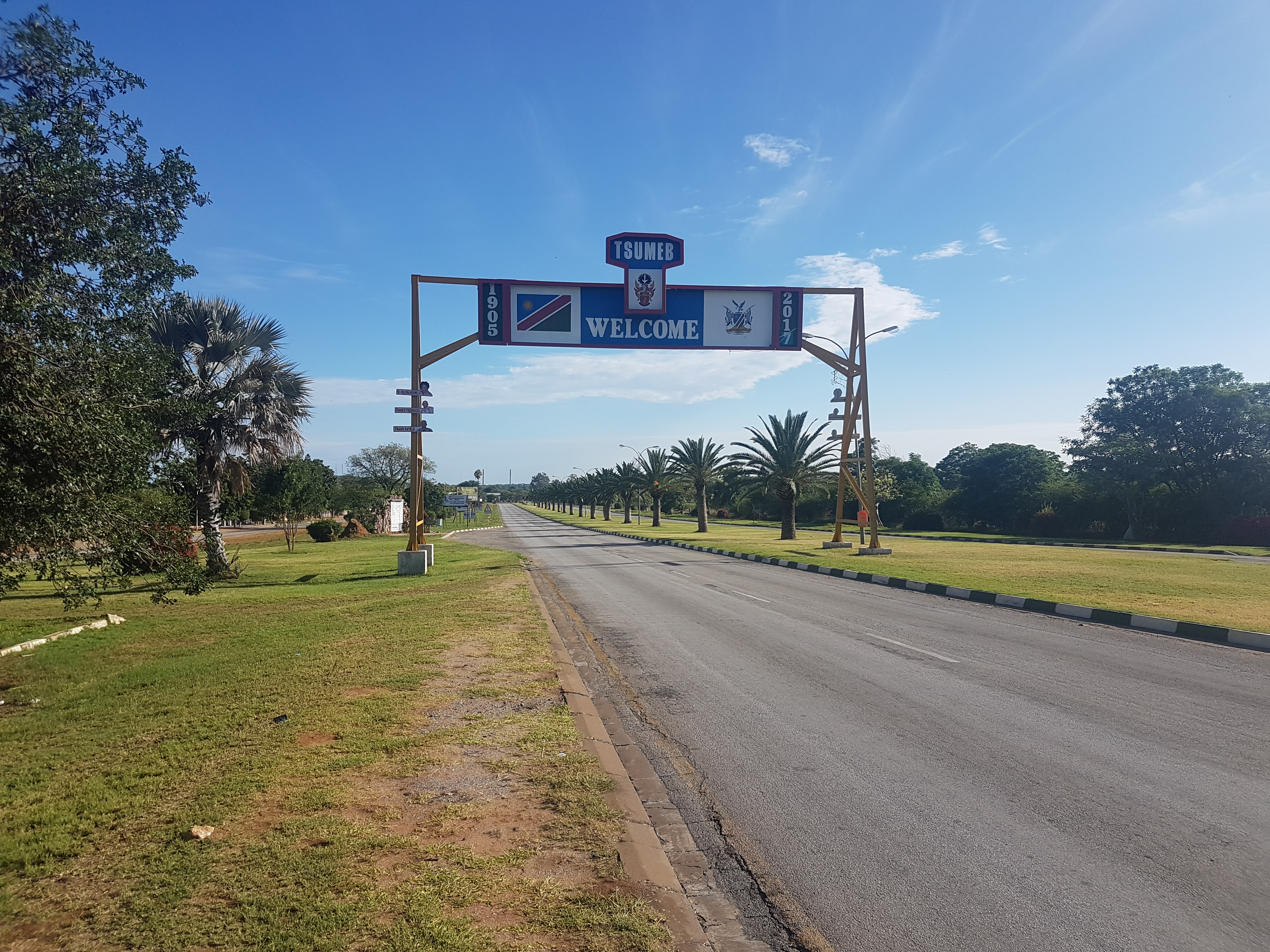

- Coat of arms
- Motto(s): Glück auf (German miners' greeting)
- Location in Namibia
- Coordinates: 19°15′S 17°52′E
- Country: Namibia
- Region: Oshikoto Region
- Constituency: Tsumeb Constituency

Government
  - Type: Town-council
  - Mayor: Mathews Hangula (SWAPO)
  - Deputy Mayor: Anmirie Garises (PDM)

Area
  - Total: 195 sq mi (504 km^{2})
- Elevation: 4,098 ft (1,249 m)

Population (2023)
  - Total: 34,960
  - Density: 180/sq mi (69.4/km^{2})
- Time zone: UTC+2 (SAST)
- Climate: BSh

Tsumeb (Otjiherero: Okavisume; Khoekhoe: ǂAixorobes) is a town of around 35,000 inhabitants and the largest town and the former capital of the Oshikoto region in northern Namibia.

Tsumeb, since its founding in 1905, has been primarily a mining town. The town is the site of a deep mine (the lower workings now closed) whose ore deposits with respect to variety, rarity and aesthetics of minerals have been listed among 100 geological heritage sites around the world by the International Union of Geological Sciences (IUGS).

== History ==
The name Tsumeb is generally pronounced "SOO-meb". The name derives from both Otjiherero: Otjiisume, place of the frogs, referencing the varied colors of the surrounding rocks, and Khoekhoe: Tsomsoub, to dig a hole in loose ground, referencing early mining activities.

The town was founded in 1905 by Imperial Germany when the territory was the colony of German South West Africa.

Historical population
Year	Pop.	±% p.a.
2001	14,929	—
2011	19,275	+2.59%
2023	34,960	+5.09%

== Geography ==
Tsumeb is known as the "gateway to the north" of Namibia. It is the closest town to the Etosha National Park. The largest meteorite in the world, called Hoba, lies in a field about forty minutes' drive to the southeast of Tsumeb, at Hoba West. It is a nickel-iron meteorite of about 60 tonnes.

=== Minerals ===
Tsumeb is notable for the huge mineralized pipe that led to its foundation. The origin of the pipe has been hotly debated. The pipe penetrates more or less vertically through the Precambrian Otavi dolomite for at least 1,300 m. One possibility is that the pipe was actually a gigantic ancient cave system and that the rock filling it is sand that seeped in from above. If the pipe is volcanic, as some have suggested, then the rock filling it (the "pseudo-aplite") is peculiar in the extreme. The pipe was mined in prehistoric times but those ancient workers barely scratched the surface. Most of the ore was removed in the 20th century by cut-and-fill methods. The ore was polymetallic and from it copper, lead, silver, gold, arsenic and germanium were won. There was also a fair amount of zinc present but the recovery of this metal was always difficult for technical reasons. Many millions of tonnes of ore of spectacular grade were removed. A good percentage of the ore (called "direct smelting ore") was so rich that it was sent straight to the smelter situated near the town without having to be processed through the mineral enrichment plant. The Tsumeb mine is also renowned amongst mineral collectors. Tsumeb belongs to the world's most prolific mineralogical sites. The minerals from Tsumeb are unsurpassed in variety and quality of form.

At least 170 mineral species have been cataloged and 20 of these are found nowhere else. The concentration of ingredients for Tsumeb's mineral formations originates in a sulfide deposit rich in many metals. A non-arid environment plentiful in oxygen-rich groundwater contributed to leaching and re-deposition of these elements as new minerals, sometimes in crystalline formations. There are rare secondary minerals of Pb, Cu, Zn, As, Sb and, reflecting the ore deposit chemistry, Ge, Ga and Cd as well. Minerals first described from Tsumeb include, according to Mindat.org:

- rare (but also a few common) arsenates: andyrobertsite, arsenbrackebuschite, arsendescloizite, arsentsumebite, biehlite, calcioandyrobertsite, chudobaite, duftite, ekatite, fahleite, feinglosite, ferrilotharmeyerite, gaitite, gebhardite, gerdtremmelite, helmutwinklerite, jamesite, johillerite, keyite, koritnigite, leiteite, ludlockite, lukrahnite, molybdofornacite, o'danielite, prosperite, reinerite, schneiderhöhnite, schultenite, sewardite, stranskiite, thometzekite, tsumcorite, warikahnite, wilhelmkleinite, zincgartrellite and zincroselite
- unique germanium (bartelkeite, calvertite, eyselite, fleischerite, germanite, itoite, krieselite (germanate topaz), mathewrogersite, otjisumeite, ovamboite, schaurteite and stottite) and gallium (gallobeudantite, söhngeite, tsumgallite) minerals
- others are: kegelite, minrecordite, otavite, plumbotsumite, queitite, sidpietersite (unique thiosulphate), stibioclaudetite, tsumebite and zincrosasite.

Minerals of Tsumeb

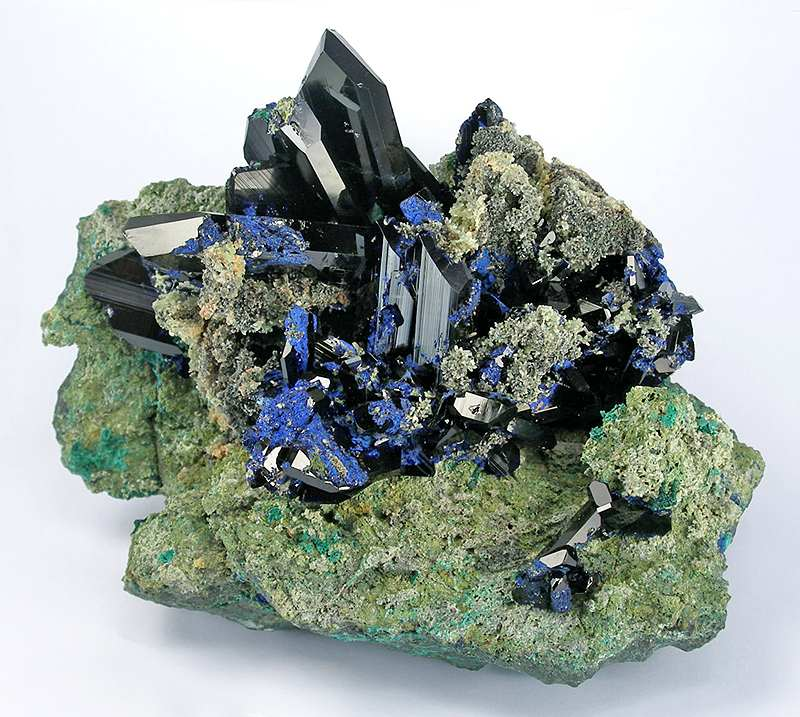
Very large cluster of azurite crystals, ex-Smithsonian collection, offered at US$125,000. Size 16.7 x 13.2 x 10.5 cm.

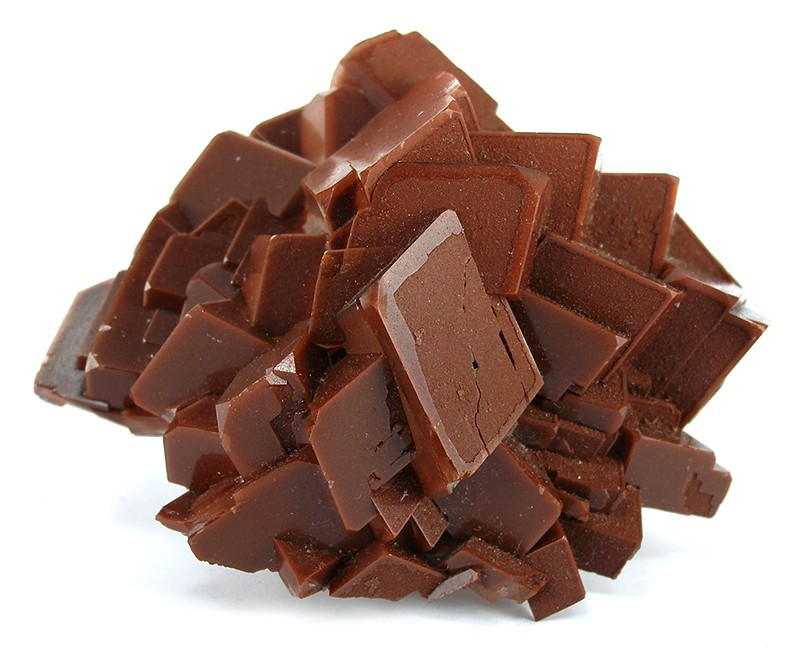
Calcite crystals colored red by tiny inclusions of hematite. Size: 9 x 9 x 4.3 cm.

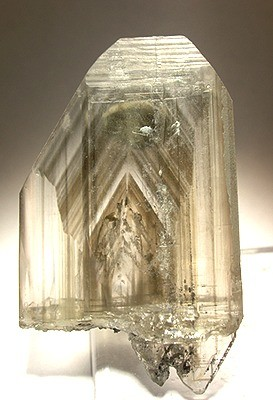
Zoned Cerussite crystal, 5.9 x 3.6 x 1 cm.

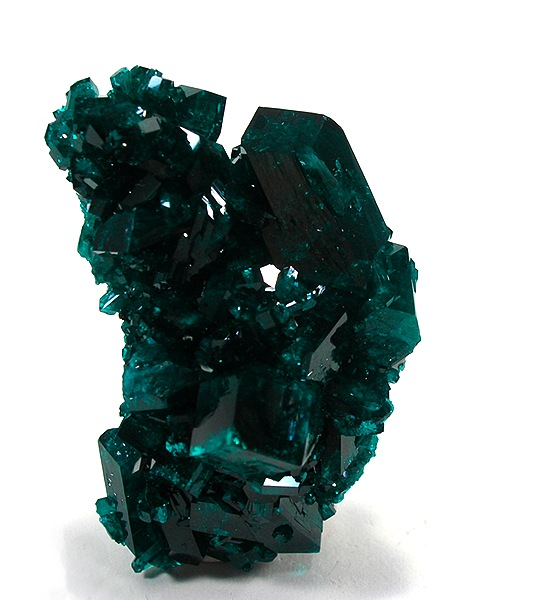
Gem-quality dioptase crystals. Tsumeb mine is the source of many of the world's best (and most expensive) dioptase specimens.

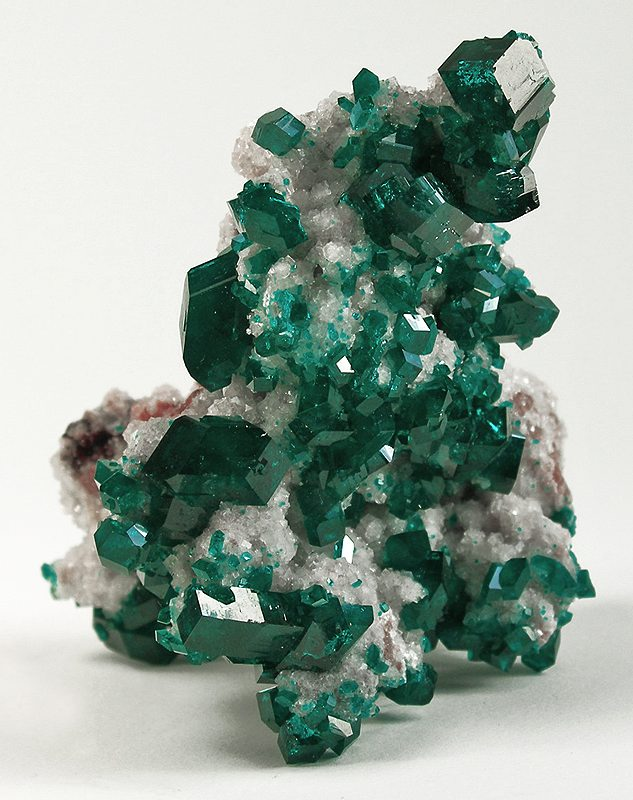
Dioptase crystals on calcite, a classic Tsumeb specimen. Size: 8.2 x 5.8 x 5.5 cm

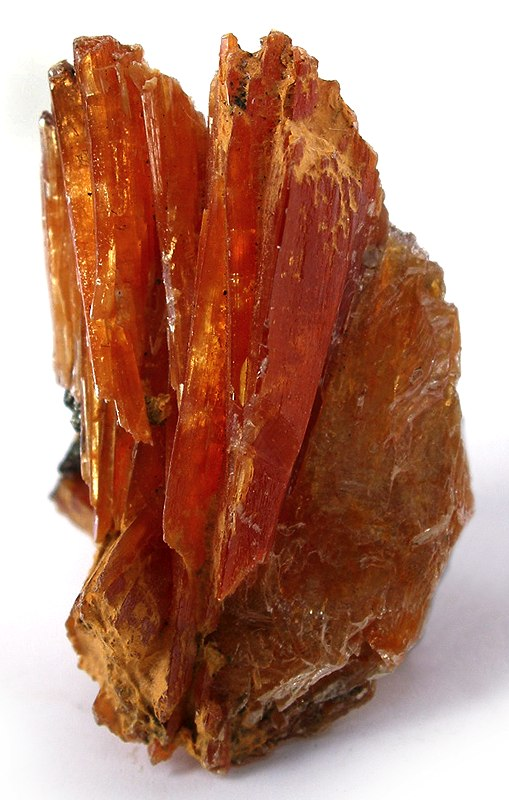
Leiteite, a zinc arsenate, colored umber-red by inclusions of Ludlockite, a lead arsenate. Tsumeb is the type locality for both species. Size: 2.8 x 1.8 x 1.2 cm.

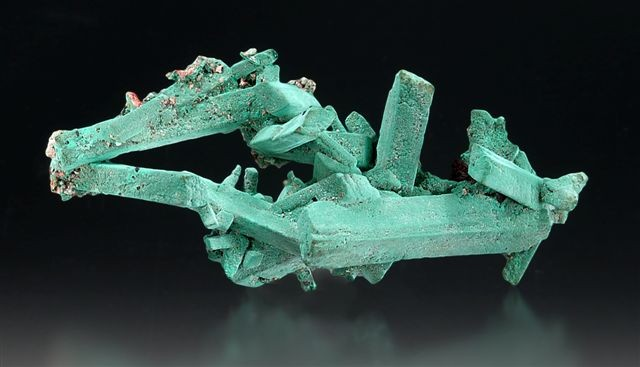
Malachite pseudomorphs after azurite, 13 x 6 x 4 cm.

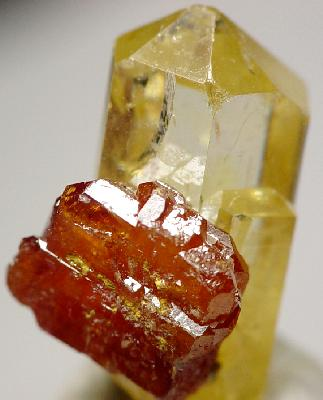
Gemmy mimetite with a "sidecar" of wulfenite, 2 x 1 x 1 cm.

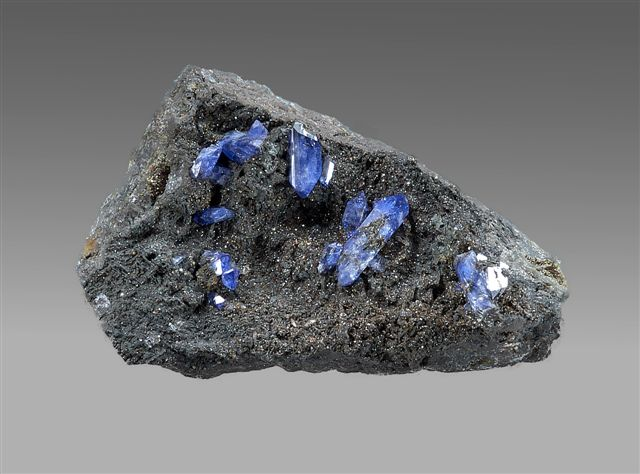
Bright blue scorodite crystals on brown-black beudantite, 8 x 5 x 3 cm.

In respect of it being 'one of the richest ore deposits with respect to variety, rarity and aesthetics of minerals in the world', the International Union of Geological Sciences (IUGS) included the 'Tsumeb Ore Deposit' in its assemblage of 100 'geological heritage sites' around the world in a listing published in October 2022. The organisation defines an IUGS Geological Heritage Site as 'a key place with geological elements and/or processes of international scientific relevance, used as a reference, and/or with a substantial contribution to the development of geological sciences through history.'

=== Sinkhole lakes ===
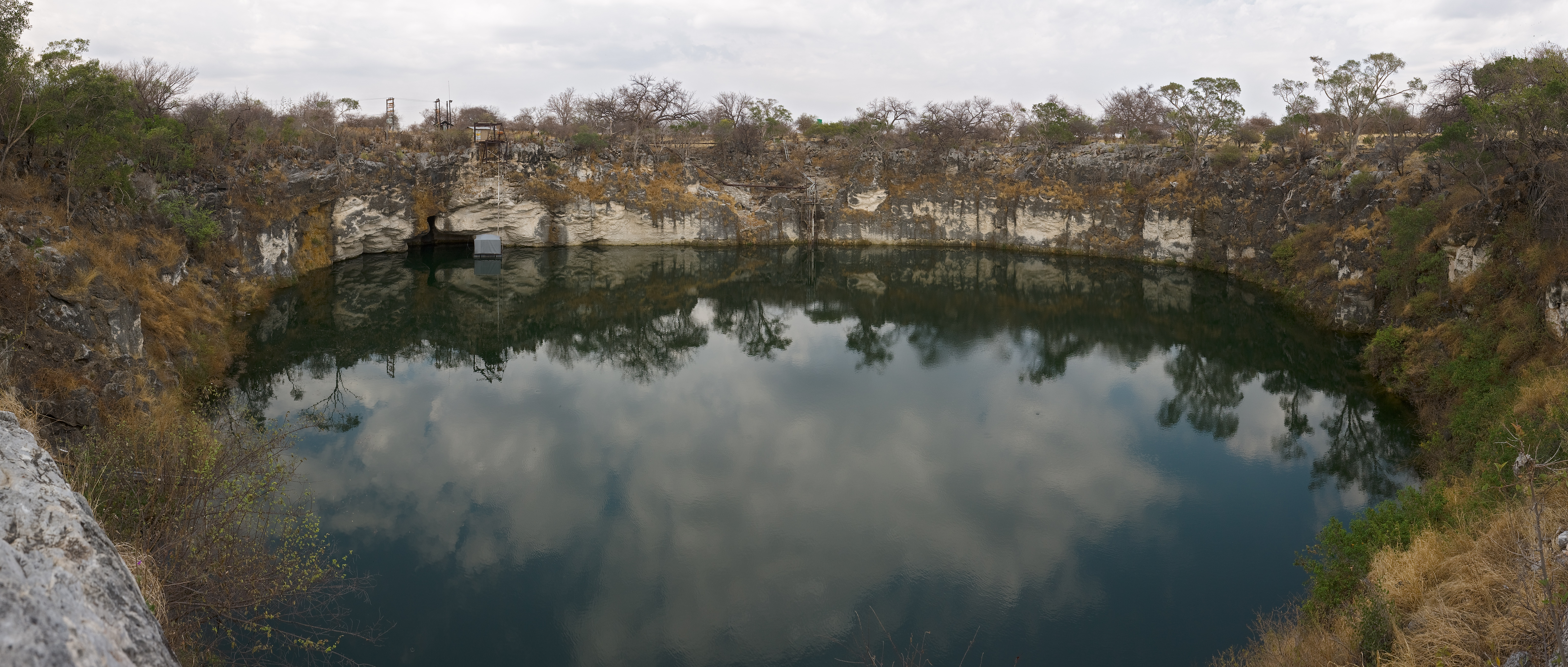
Lake Otjikoto

Near the town are two large sinkhole lakes, Lake Otjikoto and Lake Guinas ("Gwee-nus"). Guinas, at about 500 m in diameter, is somewhat larger in area than Otjikoto. A pioneering documentary movie about scuba diving in these lakes was made by Graham Ferreira in the early 1970s. The depths of the lakes are unknown, because towards the bottom both lakes disappear into lateral cave systems, so it is not possible to use a weight to sound them. Otjikoto, which has poor visibility (owing to pollution from agricultural fertilizers used nearby), is at least 60 m deep. The water in Guinas is completely clear and well over 100 m deep. Divers who have performed bounce-dives in Guinas to 80 m (strictly speaking, beyond the safe depth for such dives, especially given the altitude of the lake above sea level) have reported that there was nothing but powdery-blue water below them. Guinas has been in existence for so long that a unique species of fish, Tilapia guinasana, has evolved in its waters.

When South Africa invaded German Southwest Africa, today's Namibia, in 1914, the retreating German forces eventually threw all of their weaponry and supplies into the deep waters of Otjikoto. Some of the material has been recovered for display in museums.

One of the largest and deepest underground lakes in the world lies a little to the east of Tsumeb, on farm called Harasib. To reach the water in the cave one has either to abseil or to descend an ancient, hand-forged ladder that hangs free of the vertical dolomite walls of the cave for over 50 m. Here, too, scuba divers have descended as deep as they have dared (80 m) in the crystal-clear waters and have reported nothing but deep blue below them from one ledge of dolomite to the next with nothing discernible in the depths.

=== Climate ===
Tsumeb has a hot semi-arid climate (Köppen: BSh), with hot summers and mild winters (with warm days and chilly nights). The average annual precipitation is 528 mm (21 in).

Tsumeb

Climate chart (precipitation, max. and min. temperature)
J	F	M	A	M	J	J	A	S	O	N	D
130 31 18	121 30 18	91 29 17	34 29 14	4 27 9	1 25 6	0 25 5	0 28 8	2 32 13	18 33 16	60 33 18	67 33 18
- █ Average max. and min. temperatures in °C
- █ Precipitation totals in mm
- Source: World Climate Guide
Imperial conversion
J	F	M	A	M	J	J	A	S	O	N	D
5.1 88 64	4.8 86 64	3.6 84 63	1.3 84 57	0.2 81 48	0 77 43	0 77 41	0 82 46	0.1 90 55	0.7 91 61	2.4 91 64	2.6 91 64
- █ Average max. and min. temperatures in °F
- █ Precipitation totals in inches

== Economy and infrastructure ==
There are 105 commercial farms around Tsumeb. The area consists largely of rolling hills covered in thorn bush. Tsumeb falls under the dry woodland, savanna vegetation zone. Much of farmland is affected by woody plant encroachment. The soil around Tsumeb varies in quality from very fertile red loam through black turf to chalky clay and loam. The district is thus suitable for intensified farming and crop production. There is an abundance of ground water and regular rainfall in the summer months. Irrigation makes the area even more productive. Farmers in the area grow citrus fruits with much success. The main crops grown are maize, sorghum and sunflowers. Cattle farming is also widespread.

Ohorongo Cement was established in 2007. The plant is situated between Tsumeb and Otavi on Farm Sargberg approximately 45 km south of Tsumeb. The plant has a production capacity of 650000 tonnes per annum, almost double the demand of the Namibian domestic market. It is owned by Schwenk KG. Limestone reserves appear to be adequate for approximately 300 years. Tsumeb has a concrete sleeper factory.

Just a few kilometres North of Tsumeb, the construction of the 40 MW Otjikoto Biomass Power Station began in 2024, with an expected completion in 2027. The power station will source biomass from farmland that is affected by woody plant encroachment.

Every year the Tsumeb Municipality organises the Tsumeb Copper Festival. More than 200 small and medium enterprises (SMEs) and bigger exhibitors showcase their products and services at the annual fair. The festival takes place annually during the last weekend of October at the United Nations Park. The four-day event, which is aimed at boosting the economic competitiveness of the town, draws crowds from all corners of the country and beyond. It also facilitates indirect investments in the hospitality sector.

The Evaristus Shikongo Correctional Facility in Tsumeb is one of Namibia's seven major prisons. Tsumeb's stadium, the Oscar Norich Stadium, has a capacity of 1,500.

=== Tsumeb mine ===
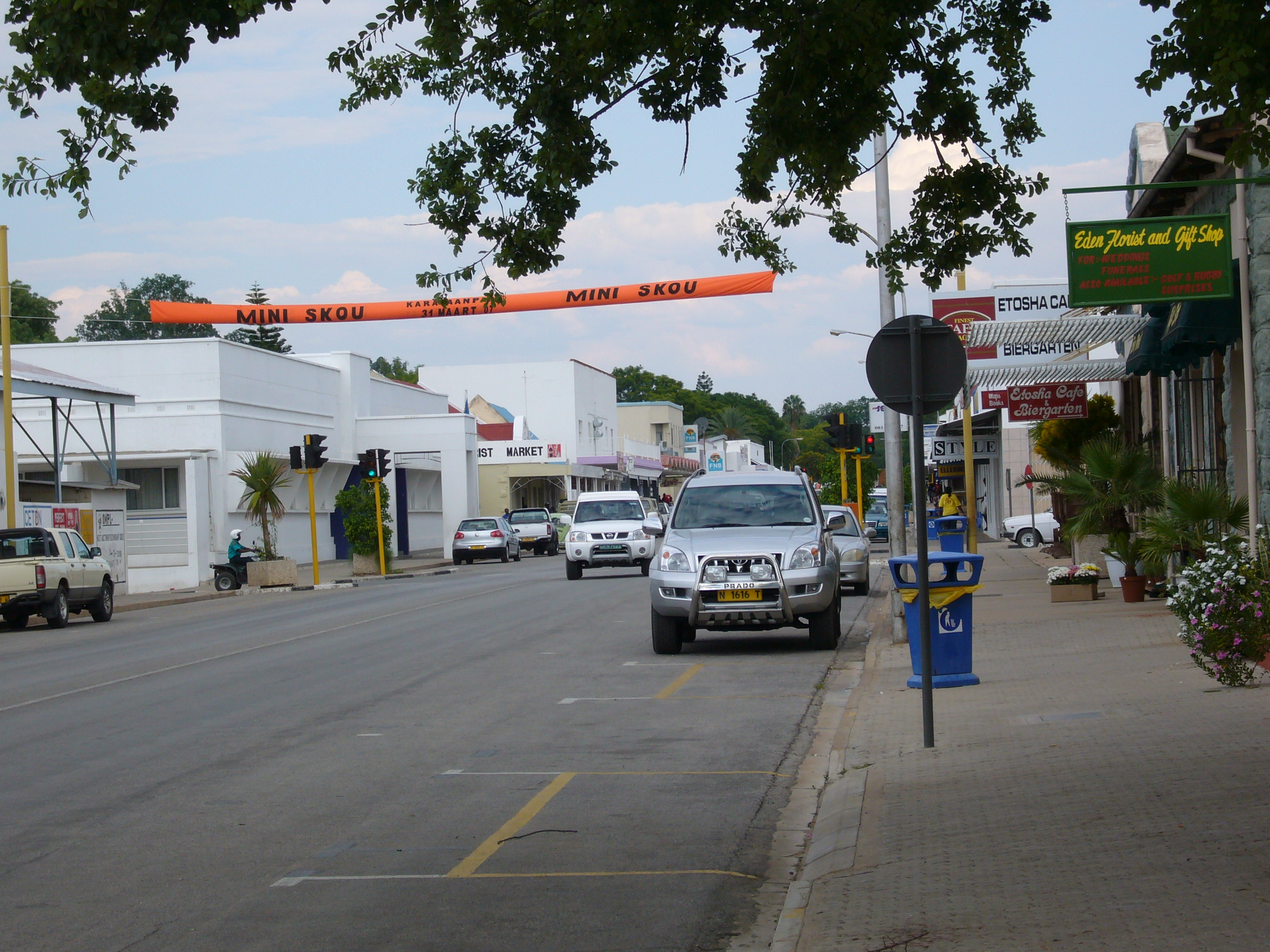
Main road in Tsumeb

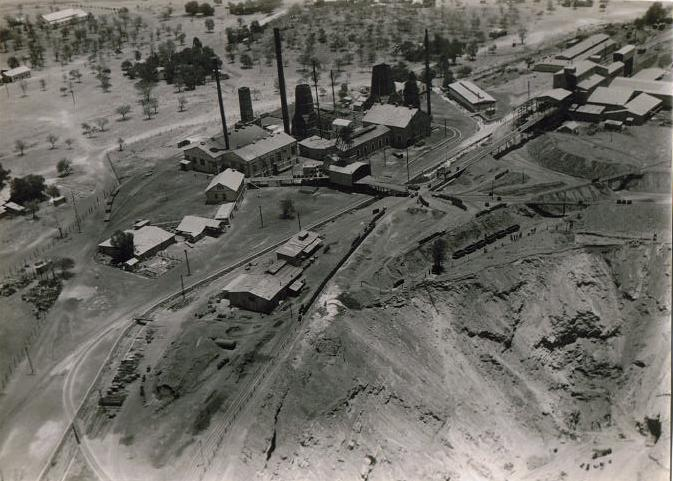
Tsumeb open cast pit, buildings and railway about 1931

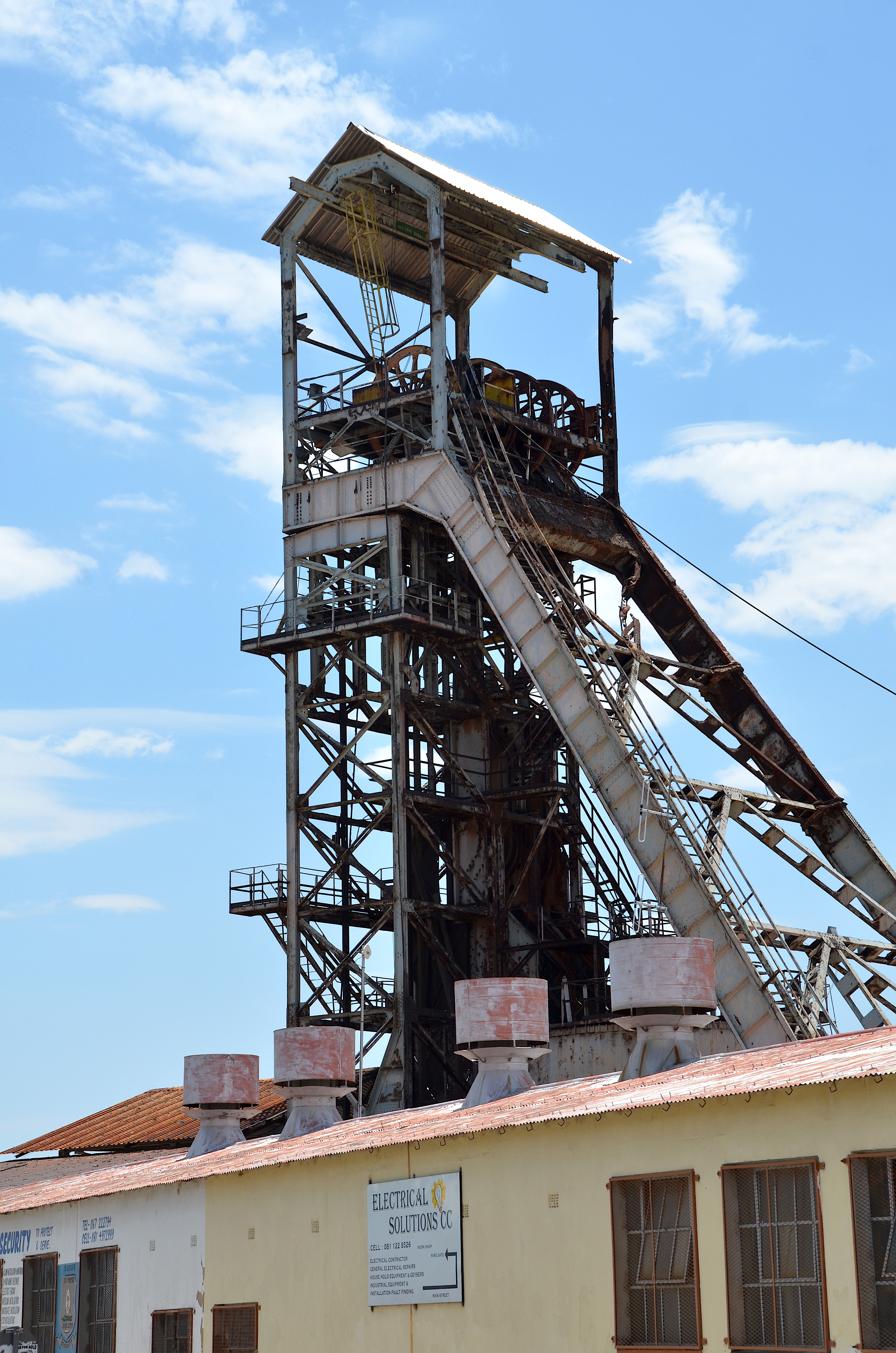
Shaft tower of disused mine in Tsumeb (2014)

Tsumeb, since its founding, has been primarily a mining town. The mine was originally owned by the OMEG (Otavi Minen- und Eisenbahn-Gesellschaft) and later by TCL (Tsumeb Corporation Limited) before its closure a few years ago, when the ore at depth ran out. The main shafts became flooded by ground water over a kilometre deep and the water was collected and pumped as far as the capital, Windhoek. The mine has since been opened up again by a group of local entrepreneurs trading as Ongopolo Mining. A fair amount of oxidized ore remains to be recovered in the old upper levels of the mine. It is highly unlikely, though, that the deepest levels will ever be reopened.

Between 1905 and 1996, Tsumeb mine produced about 30 million tons of ore yielding 1.7 Mt copper, 2.8 Mt lead 0.9 Mt zinc, as well as 80 t germanium. The average ore grade was 10% Pb, 4.3% Cu, 3.5% Zn, 100 ppm Ag, 50 ppm Ge.

It is noted for 243 valid minerals and is the type location for 56 types of mineral. Some of the germanium minerals are only found in this mine.

From 1971 to 1972, the Tsumeb mine had its operations temporarily stopped during the 1971–72 Namibian contract workers strike over the contract labor system and apartheid.

The other notable feature of the town is the metal smelter, for a long time the biggest employer in town. Previously owned by Namibia Custom Smelters, it was sold by Weatherly International mining company to Dundee Corporation in 2010. Dundee mainly smelted copper ores from Bulgaria here. The right of the smelter is currently owned by IXM.

The smelter operation has led to widespread soil contamination with arsenic and other heavy metals. Hair samples from the local population show "that the population of Tsumeb is massively exposed to arsenic". It also impacted air quality negatively. The stockpile of arsenic waste has been deposited in a landfill. Its exact size is unknown but it is speculated to amount to 300,000t, one of the largest such accumulations in the world.

=== Transport ===
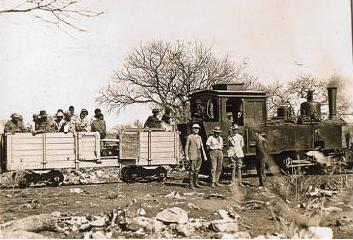
Otavi Mining and Railway Company train near Tsumeb about 1931. The photograph must have been taken in winter, as the trees have no leaves. Despite the fact that Tsumeb is in the tropics, it is well over a thousand metres above sea level and frosty in winter.

The main road leads north, to Ondangwa and onwards to Oshakati and Angola. To the north-east a newly constructed Bituminous Road towards Tsintsabis leads to Katwitwi Border Post and Angola. To the east, through Grootfontein, the road leads towards Rundu and Katima Mulilo and to the south, through Otavi to Otjiwarongo and Windhoek.

Tsumeb is connected to the national railway network operated by TransNamib. Tsumeb was for most of the 20th century the terminus of the line but in recent times the track has been extended a further 260 km to reach Ondangwa. There have been talks of extending the line to Oshikango and having the Government of Angola build a railroad from the north to connect the two countries together. The junction for the Ondangwa line is located at the "wrong end" of Tsumeb railway station, leaving it a dead end, though a second triangle is provided for through trains to bypass the station.

Tsumeb Airport is an airstrip east of town.

== Politics ==
Tsumeb used to be the regional capital of Oshikoto until 2008, when Omuthiya was proclaimed a town and the new capital. The area around Tsumeb forms its own electoral constituency that has a population of 44,113.

The city of Tsumeb is governed by a municipal council that has seven seats. Nico Kaiyamo is one of the well-known and established local politicians.

In the 2010 local authority election, a total of 3,120 votes were cast in the city. SWAPO won with approximately 75% of the vote. Of the four other parties seeking seats, Rally for Democracy and Progress (RDP) received approximately 15% of the vote, followed by United Democratic Front (UDF, 5%), All People's Party (APP, 2%), and the Democratic Turnhalle Alliance (DTA, 2%) Despite being on the ballot, the Congress of Democrats (CoD) did not receive a vote. The 2015 local authority election was again won by SWAPO which gained six seats and 3,149 votes. The remaining seat went to the DTA which gained 291 votes.

The 2020 local authority election was also won by SWAPO which obtained 2,518 votes and gained four seats. The Independent Patriots for Change (IPC), an opposition party formed in August 2020, obtained 1,472 votes and gained two seats. The remaining seat went to the Popular Democratic Movement (PDM, the new name of the DTA) with 199 votes.

== Town twinning ==
- (United Kingdom) Chesterfield, UK
- Elverum, Norway

== Notable people ==
- Alfred Angula
- Benjamin Hauwanga
- Mburumba Kerina (1932–2021), co-founder of SWAPO, NUDO, and FCN
- Heino Senekal
- Gervatius Uri Khob

== Educational institutes and training facilities ==
Tsumeb is home to a number of primary and secondary schools as well as an Adult Education Center, which resorts under the Ministry of Education.

=== Training facilities ===
- Adult Education Center
- Namibia Institute of Mining and Technology (NIMT), Northern campus
- Polytechnic of Namibia Center
- University of Namibia Center

=== Schools ===
- Etosha Secondary School (Afrikaans: Hoërskool Etosha)
- Tsumeb Secondary School
- Otjikoto Secondary School
- Tsumeb Gymnasium
- Opawa Combined School
- Francis Galton Primary School
- Kuvukiland Primary School
- Tsumeb English Medium Primary School
- Nomtsoub Primary School
- Ondundu Primary School
- St. Francis Primary School
