= Otjikoto Lake =

Lake and national monument in Namibia

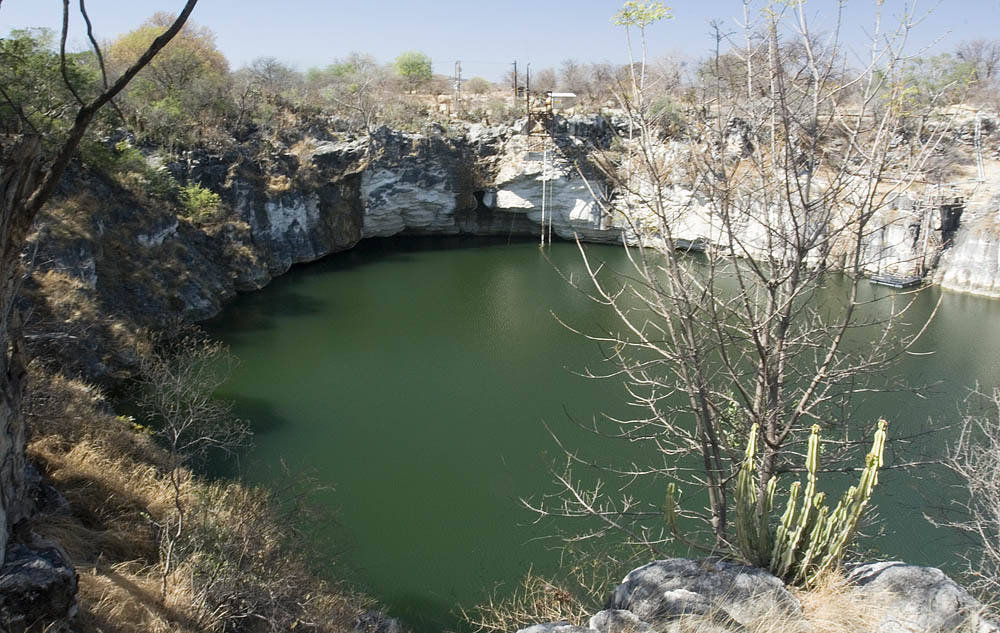

- Location within Namibia
- Coordinates: 19°11′41″S 17°32′59″E
- Basin countries: Namibia
- Surface area: 0.51 hectares (1.3 acres)
- Average depth: 45 metres (148 ft)
- Max. depth: 91 metres (299 ft)
- Water volume: 229,500 cubic metres (8,100,000 cu ft)

Otjikoto Lake is the smaller of only two permanent natural lakes in Namibia. It is a sinkhole lake that was created by a collapsing karst cave. It is located 20 kilometres (12 mi) north-west of Tsumeb and only 100 meters from the main road B1. The lake was declared a national monument in 1972.

The diameter of the lake is 102 metres (335 ft); its depth is supposedly more than 91.44 meters, according to scans. According to a Namibian tourism information organisation, "the depth varies from sixty two meters at the side to one hundred meters in the center - and in some places leading off from the side - depths of one hundred meters have been recorded", while an article in the Allgemeine Zeitung explains the depth problem: "the lake tapers into a lateral cave system making it impossible to determine its exact depth, estimated to be in access (sic) of 142 meters."

The lake was known to the San under the name Gaisis ("ugly"). When the Herero moved into the area, they named it Otjikoto (Otjiherero: "deep hole"). Namibia's Oshikoto Region, in which the lake is situated, is an alternative spelling of Otjikoto and derives its name from that of the lake. The first Europeans to visit the lake were Francis Galton and Carl Johan Andersson, who during their search for Lake Ngami came upon Otjikoto Lake in 1851.

The lake was a dumping ground for German Schutztruppe during World War I; in June 1915 German troops dumped war materials in the lake before surrendering to stop the South African and British troops from using them. Most of the larger pieces have been recovered and are displayed in the Tsumeb Museum, but at least two cannons, along with quantities of ammunition, are still in the lake and can be viewed with a special diving permit. According to legend, the Germans also dumped a sealed safe into the lake. The search for it and the 6 million gold marks it is said to contain has as yet not been successful.

Botanist Kurt Dinter visited the lake in 1911 and collected several hitherto unknown species of plants, among them grass of the genus Rottboellia. Tilapia guinasana, a species of cichlid fish which naturally was only found in Otjikoto's sister lake, Lake Guinas, was introduced to Otjikoto Lake. The claim that Lake Guinas is connected to Lake Otjikoto by caves is frequently made but not proven as yet.

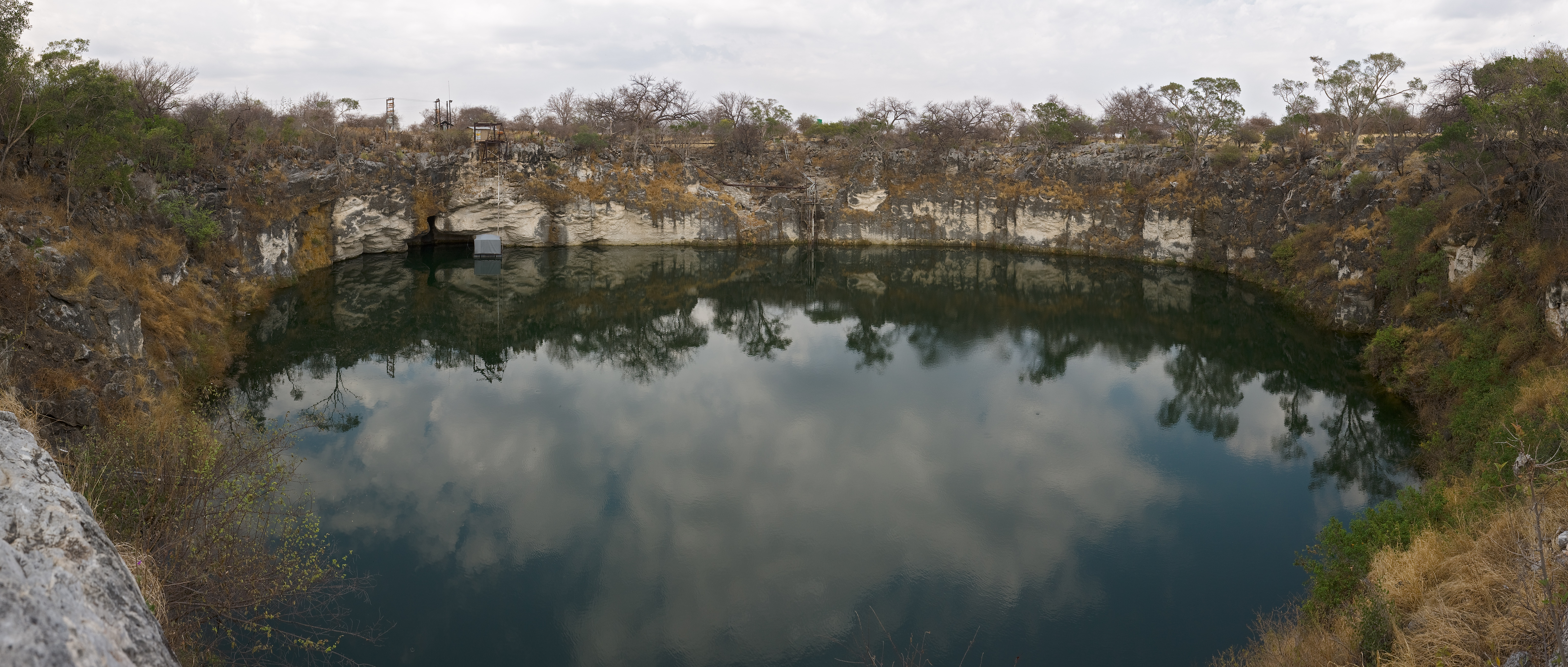
The entire lake
