= Ongwediva College of Education =

The Ongwediva College of Education (OCE) was one of four pedagogical colleges in Namibia. It offered three-year undergraduate diploma courses in basic vocational education to elementary and high school teachers: the Basic Education Teacher Diploma (BETD).

The college was based in Ongwediva town, founded in 1913 by Finnish missionaries. In addition to teaching facilities, it also maintained a university library, a computer and arts centre and student residences. Effective April 1, 2010, the college entered the Faculty of Education at the University of Namibia.

== Notable alumni ==
- Johannes Nakwafila
- Mzee Kaukungwa
- Henock Kankoshi
- Marten Kapewasha
- Neshani Andreas

== See also ==
- Education in Namibia
- List of schools in Namibia
