= Omuntele =

Coordinates: 18.2333°S 16.2333°E

Omuntele is a village with almost 2,000 inhabitants in the Oshikoto region in the northeast of Namibia. The village is located on a high plateau 1,089 meters above sea level and has an airfield. 14 km (8.7 mi) south of Omuntele lies the Ekango salt pan.

Omuntele is the administrative centre of Omuntele Constituency with an area of 1629.61 km² and 16,865 inhabitants.

== See also ==
- Administrative divisions of Namibia
