= Tsumeb Constituency =

Electoral constituency in the Oshikoto region of northern Namibia

Coordinates: 19°15′S 17°42′E

Tsumeb constituency (red) in the Oshikoto Region

Tsumeb Constituency (until 1999 Oshikoto Constituency) is an electoral constituency in the Oshikoto Region of Namibia, comprising the town area and surroundings of Tsumeb. It had a population of 44,113 in 2004 and 19,065 registered voters in 2020.

== Politics ==
Tsumeb constituency is traditionally a stronghold of the South West Africa People's Organization (SWAPO) party. In the 2004 regional election SWAPO candidate Lebbeus Tobias received 3,371 of the 4,531 votes cast.

As in all constituencies in Oshikoto, SWAPO won the 2015 regional election by a landslide. Councillor Tobias gained 4,358 votes and was reelected, while the only opposition candidate Richard Hoeseb of the Democratic Turnhalle Alliance (DTA) gained 748. The SWAPO candidate also won the 2020 regional election, albeit by a much smaller margin. Gottlieb Ndjendjela received 3,640 votes, while Matti Amoolongo of the Independent Patriots for Change (IPC), a party formed in August 2020, obtained 2,016 votes. Kariiwe Kuhanga of the Popular Democratic Movement (PDM, the new name of the DTA) came third with 322 votes.

== See also ==
- Administrative divisions of Namibia
