= Wilbard Shikongo =

Namibian military officer

Wilbard Imene Shikongo
- Born: 6 February 1957; Iikango, South-West Africa
- Died: 25 April 2025 (aged 68); Tsumeb, Namibia
- Burial place: Onankali
- Military career
- Allegiance: Namibia
- Branch: People's Liberation Army of Namibia; Namibian Army
- Service years: 1978–2017
- Rank: Brigadier General
- Commands: Commandant Military School
- Conflicts: Namibian War of Independence

Brigadier General Wilbard Imene Shikongo (6 February 1957 – 5 April 2025) was a Namibian military officer. His last command was as the Commandant of the Namibian Defence Force Training Establishment.

== Career ==
His military career started in 1978 when he joined the People's Liberation Army of Namibia in exile. He received his basic military training and then specialized as a signaler at the Tobias Hainyeko Training Center in Lubango and specialised as a radio communications operator. From 1979 to 1981 he was deployed to the Northern Front Headquarters. In 1982 He was transferred from the Northern Front HQ to "D" Detachment as a telegram operator. He served until 1985 where he was sent to study a three-year military science Officer cadet course. In 1989 he was again sent to the Soviet Union to Study for his Military Science Degree. In August 1990 he was a pioneer of the NDF officer corps as he was inducted with the rank of Captain and appointed Staff Officer Grade 3 at Army Headquarters. He served in various capacities and ranks within the military. Shikongo was promoted to Brigadier General and appointed Commandant of the Namibian Military School on 14 April 2014, having succeeded Brig. Gen. Fredrick Siluzungila. At this occasion, he was promoted from Colonel to Brigadier General. He served in that position until February 2017 when Brig. Gen. Joshua Namhindo took over from him.

== Qualifications ==
- Junior Staff Course
- Peacekeeping Course
- Joint Command and Staff Course(Zimbabwe)
- Executive Course in Defence and Security ManagementUNISA

== Honours and decorations ==
- Most Distinguished Order of Namibia: 4th Class Medal on Heroes' Day 2014
- Namibian Army Pioneer Medal
- NDF 10 years service medal
- Army Ten Years Service Medal
- Army Twenty Years Service Medal
- Campaign Medal
- Mandume Ya Ndemufayo Operation Medal

Military offices
Preceded by Brig Gen Fredrick Siluzungila	Commandant Namibian Military School; 1 April 2014 – 27 February 2017	Succeeded by Brig Gen Joshua Namhindo
