= August Pettinen =

August Pettinen (9 December 1857 Ristiina – 5 March 5, 1914) was a Finnish missionary who worked in Owamboland (now Namibia) for twenty years from 1887. He developed the mission schools, experimented with cotton cultivation in Owamboland and drew ndonga-language textbooks. He collected linguistic and ethnological material, which was published in the periodical Zeitschrift für Eingeborenensprachen between 1925 and 1927.

Pettinen first worked at the Omangundu and Olukonda mission stations. In 1890, he founded the Ondangwa mission station in the western part of Ondonga; this became his base. Pettinen was lively and friendly and won the trust of the local people. Pettinen was particularly interested in school work and devoted much of his energy in literary work. In addition to his collection of ethnographical photographs, he assembled his own folklore collection. In Ondangwa, a small cotton-manufacturing school was run by Pettinen.

== Personal life ==
Pettinen's parents were school champion Karl Pettinen and Eve Katarina Pettinen. He attended the Finnish Evangelical Lutheran Mission missionary school and he was ordained a missionary in 1886. Pettinen was a missionary in Owamboland in the years 1887–1896, 1899–1908 and 1911–1914.

== Publications ==
- Okaramata k'otango, ka ńolua, [sn], 1898. Abc-bok på Ovambospråket.
- Okaramata kokuilonga 'Kulesa, [sn], 1902.
- Ijäisyysmietelmiä. 1 quiet moments contemplating Aug. Pettinen. Finnish Missionary Society, 1910.
- Ijäisyysmietelmiä. 2. moments of silence meditating in Aug. Pettinen. Finnish Missionary Society, 1911.
- Okaramata k'elongo lj'uukriste, Finska Missionssällskapet, 1913.
- GEBETS Zaubersprühe und der Aandonga; Märchen der Aandonga; Mythen und Sagen der Aandonga; Lieder und der Rätscl Aandonga Berlin, 1925–1927.
- Sagen und Mythen der Aandonga, 1926
