= Nico Kaiyamo =

Hosea Nico Kaiyamo

Regional Councillor
- In office 1992–2003
- Succeeded by: Lebbeus Tobias

Member of National Council
- In office 1993–2003

Personal details
- Born: 12 November 1961 (age 64) Ondobe Constituency, Ohangwena Region, Namibia
- Party: SWAPO
- Spouse: Alina Kaiyamo
- Relations: Dr Elia Kaiyamo
- Children: 2
- Education: Polytechnic of Namibia
- Occupation: Politician, businessman

Hosea Nico Kaiyamo (born 12 November 1961) is a Namibian politician, an author and businessman who was the first regional councillor for the Tsumeb Constituency and a member of parliament in the National Council. He was an activist for South-West Africa People's Organisation (SWAPO) in its long struggle against South African rule until Namibia obtained independence on 21 March 1990. He was elected Regional Councillor for the Tsumeb Constituency in 1993 and remained in office until 2003. He was a member of parliament in the National Council from 1993 to 2003.

== Early life ==
Kaiyamo was born in Ondobe Constituency in the Ohangwena Region of northern Namibia. He is the son of the late Mika Kaiyamo, a prominent evangelist and the brother of Elia Kaiyamo, the former Deputy Minister of Home Affairs and Immigration and the current Ambassador designate to the People's Republic of China. He grew up in a Christian family. Kaiyamo attended school in Outjo and in Windhoek. In 1977, he enrolled at Augustineum Training College. In 1980, he enrolled at the Academy for Tertiary Education, currently known as the Polytechnic of Namibia, for his tertiary education.

== Political career ==
In 1977, Kaiyamo joined SWAPO as a student and soon became a well-known activist for the struggle of independence. When he was 25 years old, he took controversial pictures of dead SWAPO insurgents on Casspirs and sent them to The Namibian newspaper for publication. After independence, Kaiyamo was elected as the first regional councillor for the Tsumeb Constituency, a position he held from 1992 to 2003. During the time he served as the Councillor, the constituency of Tsumeb went through major industrial and agricultural changes. Tsumeb was the capital of the Oshikoto Region at that time, and mining the Tsumeb mine, currently known as Namibia Custom Smelters, was at its peak. Kaiyamo was also a member of the National Council from 1993 to 2003. In 2003, Kaiyamo resigned from his positions. In 2010, it was alleged that Kaiyamo was associated with the Tsumeb Rate Payers Association, an organisation formed to challenge SWAPO in the local authorities elections. This led to the suspension of Kaiyamo from Swapo On 21 May 2012, Kaiyamo's suspension was lifted at a Swapo Politburo Meeting. Kaiyamo is still an active Swapo member and a community activist.

== Personal life ==
Nico Kaiyamo married Alina Kaiyamo on 12 December 1987. They have two children: Trevor Nalimanguluke Kaiyamo (born 1989) and Galvin Panduleni Kaiyamo (born 1997). The family resides their family house in Tsumeb.

== Authorship ==
Kaiyamo authored an Autobiography titled "My Journey" that was launched on the 23rd of November 2023 in Windhoek.
