= Krieselite =

Mineral

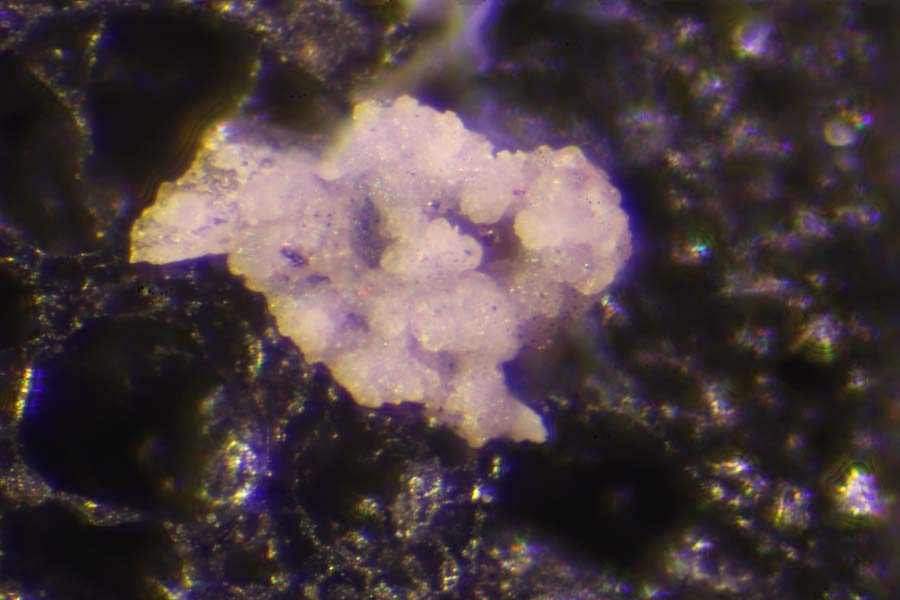
- Krieselite, from Tsumeb, Namibia

General
- Category: Minerals
- Formula: Al_{2}GeO_{4}(OH)_{2}
- IMA symbol: Kes
- Strunz classification: 9.AF.35
- Dana classification: 75.01.03.01
- Crystal system: Orthorhombic
- Crystal class: Dipyramidal (mmm); H-M symbol: (2/m 2/m 2/m)
- Space group: Pnma

Identification
- Formula mass: 230.81 g/mol
- Color: Beige to white
- Crystal habit: Isotypic with topaz
- Mohs scale hardness: 5 1/2 - 6 1/2
- Luster: Greasy
- Streak: White
- Density: 4.069 g/cm3
- Optical properties: Biaxial
- Refractive index: NCalc= 1.81
- Birefringence: δ = 0.000

Krieselite is a newly discovered naturally occurring mineral. Found in the Tsumeb mine in Tsumeb, Namibia at an unknown date and unknown depth, the mineral was first cataloged in 1994. Following the acceptance as a new mineral by the International Mineralogical Association in 2003, the material has been matched to unknown samples from the same mine in Namibia from 1972.
