= Juuso Shikongo =

Namibian teacher, priest, activist, and public servant

Rev. Juuso Niilonga Shikongo (born in 1917 in Iihongo, Onyaanya Constituency) was a Namibian teacher, priest, activist, and notable public servant, he is well-known for having risked his life on several occasions for the welfare of his community and the Independence of Namibia.

Rev. Juuso Shikongo Secondary School was established and named in his honour.
