= Eengodi Constituency =

Electoral constituency in the Oshikoto region of northern Namibia

Coordinates: 18°13′12″S 17°15′31″E

Eengodi constituency (red) in the Oshikoto Region

Eengodi Constituency is an electoral constituency in the Oshikoto Region of Namibia. It had 14,995 inhabitants in 2004 and 7,740 registered voters in 2020. The seat of the constituency is Onamishu.

== Politics ==
Eengodi constituency is traditionally a stronghold of the South West Africa People's Organization (SWAPO) party.

=== Regional elections ===
The councillor for Eengodi constituency has been Walde Sheyavali from 1992 to 2017. In the 2004 regional election incumbent councillor Sheyavali was declared winner after no opposition party nominated a candidate.

In the 2015 local and regional elections the SWAPO candidate won again uncontested and became councillor after no opposition party nominated a candidate. The SWAPO candidate also won the 2020 regional election. Protasius Neshuku received 3,279 votes, well ahead of Twakulilwa Mwaetako of the Independent Patriots for Change (IPC), an opposition party formed in August 2020, with 407 votes.

=== General elections ===
In the 2009 general election, the Eengodi Constituency overwhelmingly supported SWAPO and incumbent president Hifikepunye Pohamba. Pohamba received 4,039 of 4,262 total votes in the constituency.
