= Okankolo Constituency =

Electoral constituency in the Oshikoto region of northern Namibia

Coordinates: 17°58′S 16°25′E

Okankolo constituency (red) in the Oshikoto Region

Okankolo Constituency is an electoral constituency in the Oshikoto Region of Namibia. It had 12,926 inhabitants in 2004 and 8,487 registered voters in 2020. The district capital is the settlement of Okankolo. Settlements in this constituency include Onkumbula, and Omeyantalala.

== Politics ==
Okankolo constituency is traditionally a stronghold of the South West Africa People's Organization (SWAPO) party.

=== Regional elections ===
In the 2004 regional election SWAPO candidate Joseph Imbili received 4,825 of the 4,850 votes cast.

In the 2015 local and regional elections the SWAPO candidate won uncontested and became councillor after no opposition party nominated a candidate. The SWAPO candidate also won the 2020 regional election. Hans Nambondi received 2,961 votes, well ahead of Wilhelm Thomas of the Independent Patriots for Change (IPC), an opposition party formed in August 2020, with 671 votes.

=== National elections ===
In the 2009 general election, incumbent President and SWAPO candidate Hifikepunye Pohamba received 96% of the votes for President.

== See also ==
- Administrative divisions of Namibia
