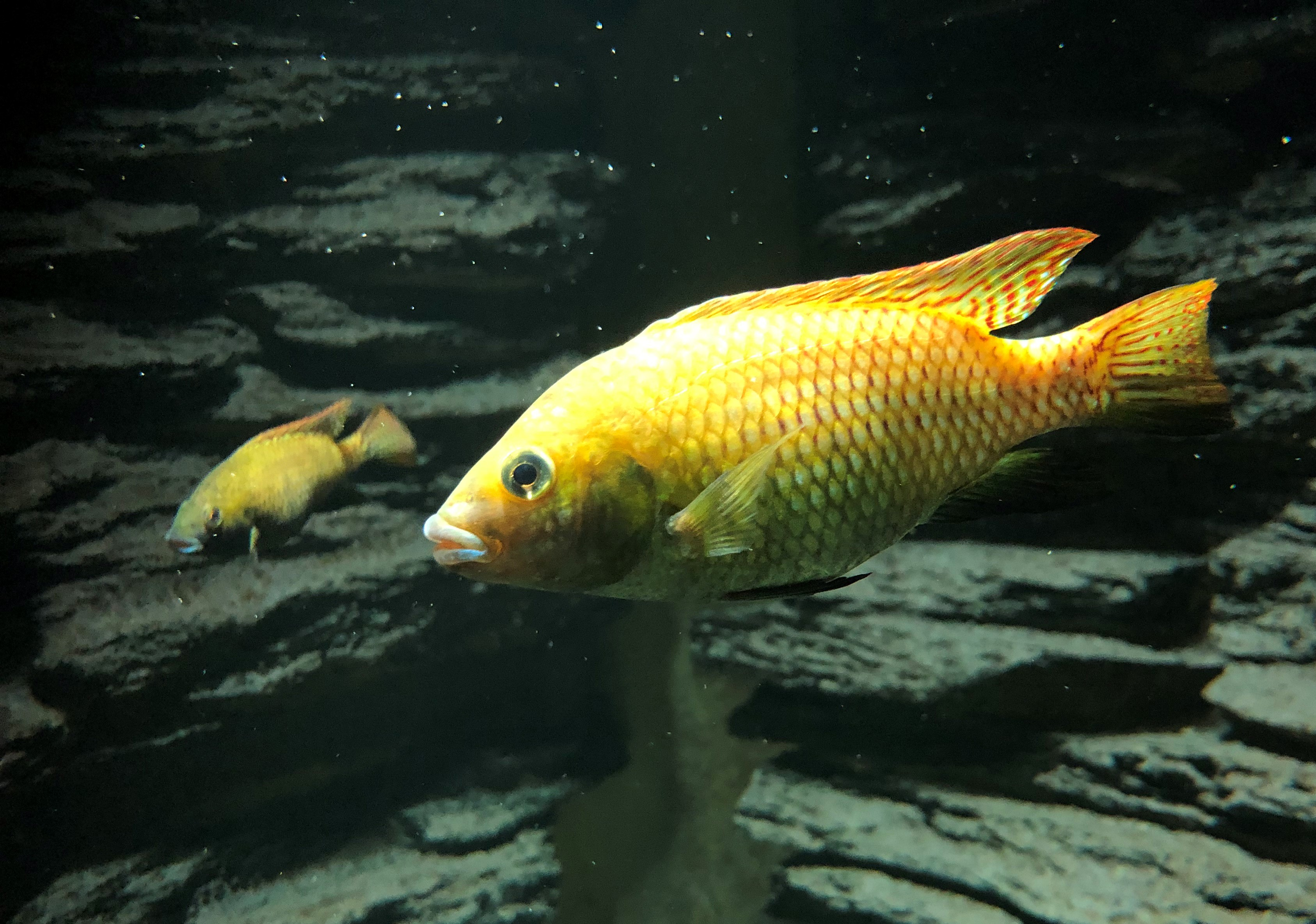

Conservation status
- Critically Endangered (IUCN 3.1)

Scientific classification
- Kingdom: Animalia
- Phylum: Chordata
- Class: Actinopterygii
- Order: Cichliformes
- Family: Cichlidae
- Genus: Tilapia
- Species: T. guinasana

Binomial name
- Tilapia guinasana Trewavas, 1936

= Otjikoto tilapia =

Species of fish

The Otjikoto tilapia (Tilapia guinasana) is a critically endangered species of cichlid fish endemic to Namibia where it was originally only found in Lake Guinas. This very small sinkhole lake contains quite clear water that generally ranges between 18 and 25 °C (64 and 77 °F) depending on season, and the Otjikoto tilapia has been seen down to depths of 67 m (220 ft). Despite deriving its common name from the nearby Lake Otjikoto, it is not native to that lake, rather being an introduced species. It is rare in the aquarium trade and also kept in garden ponds in southern Africa.

It is shoaling, but when breeding the pairs separate out, moving to the lake's vertical cliff edges where narrow ledges are used for breeding. The eggs and young are aggressively guarded by the parents. The Otjikoto tilapia mostly feeds on algae, including diatoms, but it is an opportunistic omnivore and will also take invertebrates.

The Otjikoto tilapia can reach a total length of up to 14 cm (5.5 in). When breeding, the underparts become black. Otherwise it is very variable in coloration, occurring in five main morphs, which are not sex-limited: olive, olive striped, dark blue, blue striped and light blue. The last is itself quite variable and may show some white, yellow or blotches in black. There are minor genetic differences between the morphs and assortative mating occurs, especially in the olive and dark blue (possibly showing the very early stages of separation into distinct species). Some pale individuals have a highly mottled appearance, giving the species the nicknames African koi and Nguni fish. The distinct polymorphism is not seen in the introduced population in Lake Otjikoto. It is very closely related to the banded tilapia (T. sparrmanii) and the two species can interbreed.
