= Omuthiya =

Omuthiyagwiipundi Omuthiya (short form)
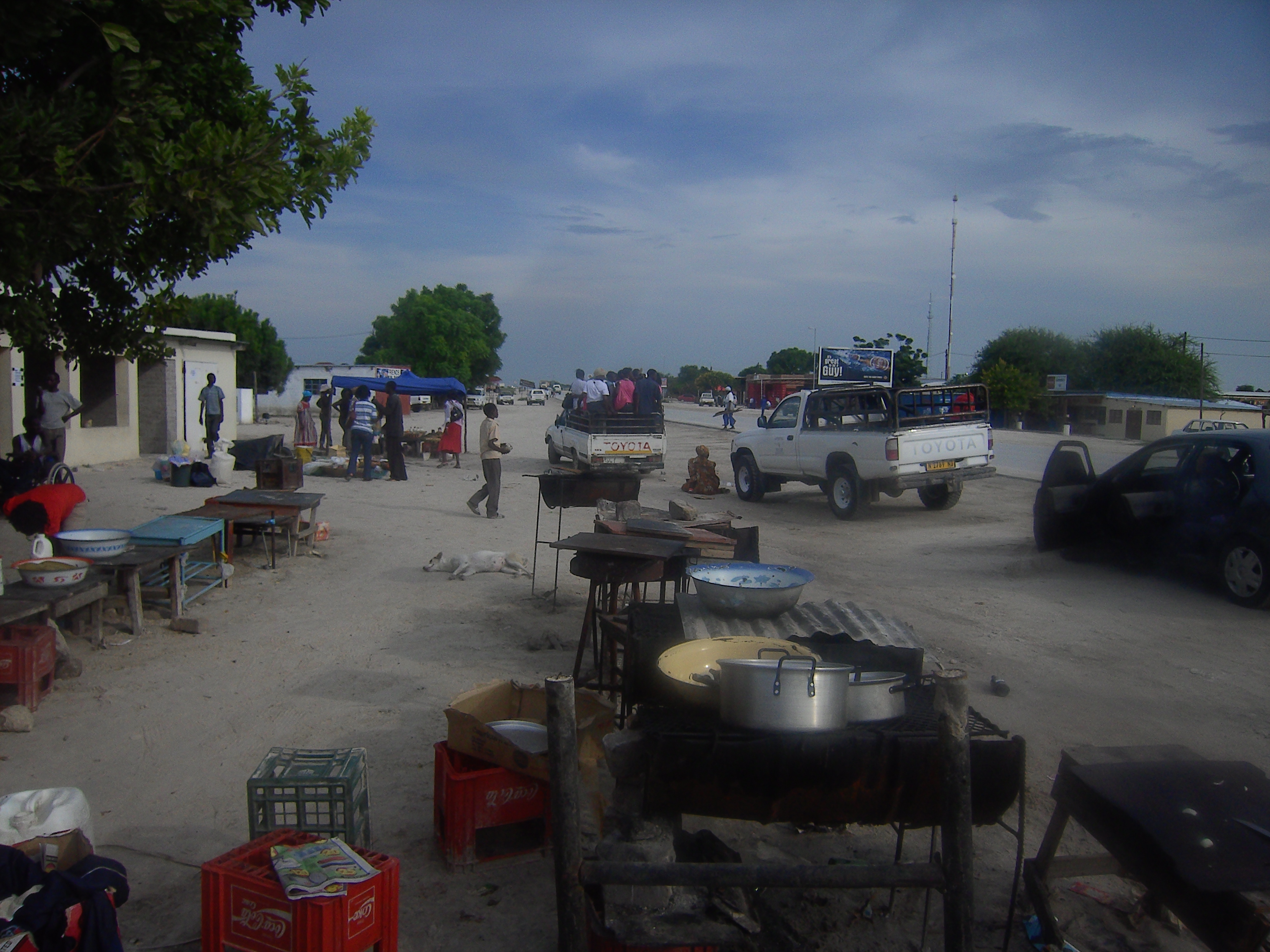
- Open air market in Omuthiya

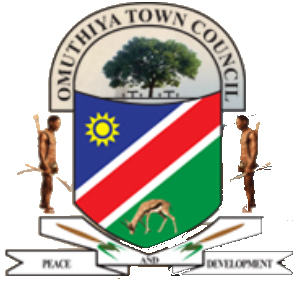
- Coat of arms

- Location in Namibia
- Coordinates: 18°21.636′S 16°34.874′E
- Country: Namibia
- Region: Oshikoto Region
- Constituency: Omuthiyagwiipundi
- Proclaimed town: 2007

Government
  - Type: Municipal council
  - Mayor: Wilbard Anyemba

Area
  - Total: 48 sq mi (125 km^{2})
- Elevation: 3,540 ft (1,079 m)

Population (2023)
  - Total: 7,560
  - Density: 157/sq mi (60.5/km^{2})
- Time zone: UTC+2 (SAST)
- Number plate: MT
- Climate: BSh
- Website: http://www.omuthiyatc.org.na/

Omuthiyagwiipundi (short: Omuthiya) is the capital of Oshikoto Region in northern Namibia. It has about 7,500 residents. Prior to Omuthiya, Tsumeb was the regional capital. The town has been proclaimed in October 2007 and the Omuthiya Town Council established in September 2008. Omuthiya has a National Traffic Information System (NaTIS) office and issues the number plate MT.

== Geography ==
Omuthiya is situated approximately 10 km (6 mi) from Etosha National Park.

Historical population
Year	Pop.	±% p.a.
2011	3,794	—
2023	7,560	+5.91%

== Politics ==
Omuthiya is governed by a town council that has seven seats.

Oshikoto Region, to which Omuthiya belongs, is a stronghold of Namibia's ruling SWAPO party. In February 2008, the town was the center of an election controversy as SWAPO faced the Rally for Democracy and Progress in the town's first local authority election. In 2010, SWAPO won Omuthiya with approximately 92% of the votes. For the 2015 local authority election no opposition party nominated a candidate, and SWAPO won uncontested.

SWAPO only narrowly won the 2020 local authority election. It obtained 746 votes and gained four seats. The Independent Patriots for Change (IPC), an opposition party formed in August 2020, obtained 630 votes and gained three seats. Johannes Ndeutepo was the mayor of Omuthiya, before he was succeeded by Wilbard Anyemba, deputised by Fiina Awala.
