= Omuntele Constituency =

Electoral constituency in the Oshikoto region of northern Namibia

Coordinates: 18.2333°S 16.2333°E

Omuntele constituency (red) in the Oshikoto Region

Omuntele Constituency is an electoral constituency in the Oshikoto Region on the northern part of Namibia. It had 21,884 inhabitants in 2004 and 9,854 registered voters in 2020. The district capital is the settlement of Omuntele.

The constituency is situated in the northwest part of Oshikoto about 60 km (37 mi) southeast of Ondangwa. The constituency is currently led by Sakeus 'Sacky' Nangula, councillor for SWAPO. It is dominated by Oshiwambo speaking people and a small number San people. People in the area survive in cultivating crops. Mahangu is the principal crop in the area.

== History ==
The area was established by Silvanus Nyambali Nehale, son of Ondonga Chief Nehale Mpingana. During the Namibian War of Independence many people from this area went into exile to Angola and took up arms there. However, between 1976 and 1980 combatants of the People's Liberation Army of Namibia (PLAN) lived at Omuntele as civilians as part of a covert reconnaissance operation. There were a number of battles in and around Omuntele like the one at Oshalongo in which Commander Marx Nekongo was seriously injured. Nekongo later became councillor of Onayena Constituency.

== Politics ==
Omuntele constituency is traditionally a stronghold of the South West Africa People's Organization (SWAPO) party.

=== Regional elections ===
In the 2004 regional election SWAPO candidate Sakeus Nangula received 5,158 of the 5,190 votes cast.

In the 2015 local and regional elections Nangula won uncontested and remained councillor after no opposition party nominated a candidate. He was re-elected with 3,869 votes in the 2020 regional election. The only opposition candidate, Erkki Shivute of the Independent Patriots for Change (IPC), a party formed in August 2020, obtained 1,659 votes.

=== National elections ===
In the 2009 general election, incumbent president and SWAPO candidate Hifikepunye Pohamba received 98% of the votes.

== See also ==
- Administrative divisions of Namibia
