= Omuthiyagwiipundi Constituency =

Electoral constituency in the Oshikoto region of northern Namibia

Coordinates: 17.7167°S 16.2167°E

Omuthiyagwiipundi constituency (red) in the Oshikoto Region

Omuthiyagwiipundi Constituency is an electoral constituency in the Oshikoto Region of Namibia. It had 21,884 inhabitants in 2004 and 15,220 registered voters in 2020. The constituency contains the settlements of Omuthiya and Iipundi. The area is predominantly rural.

== Politics ==
Omuthiyagwiipundi constituency is traditionally a stronghold of the South West Africa People's Organization (SWAPO) party. In the 2004 regional election SWAPO candidate Penda Ndakolo received 6,166 of the 6,301 votes cast.

As in all constituencies in Oshikoto, SWAPO won the 2015 regional election by a landslide. Samuel Panduleni Shivute gained 5,092 votes, while the only opposition candidate Epafras Nghinamundova of the Rally for Democracy and Progress (RDP) gained 239. Councillor Shivute (SWAPO) was re-elected with 3,759 votes in the 2020 regional election. The only opposition candidate, David Uusiku of the Independent Patriots for Change (IPC), a party formed in August 2020, obtained 2,113 votes.

== See also ==
- Administrative divisions of Namibia
