= FieldCraft (company) =

Australian information services company

- Company type: Sole proprietorship
- Industry: Information services
- Founded: 2001
- Founder: Timothy Casey
- Headquarters: South Australia
- Products: Australian Postcode Survey; Blackjack Examiner; ClearIt; DrawBridge; IQ-Power; Stretch; Web Sergeant
- Services: Web development, project management, geological services
- Website: www.fieldcraft.biz

FieldCraft, founded in 2001, is an Australian information services business specialising in general research, project management, software development, standards compliant web development, and geological services including sedimentology, petroleum geology, well site geology, and drilling rig supervision.

== Operations ==
FieldCraft operations are divided into production (of items licensed directly to the public) and services (contracts undertaken and fulfilled for other corporations). Research and software development come under production, with several products on the market. Geological services are strictly undertaken as services by contract to other corporations. Generally, web development and project management are undertaken as internal services for the purpose of supporting production operations, however, they can also be offered as services to other companies subject to a lack of conflicting interests arising from the respective project objectives.

== History ==
Technological research by FieldCraft formally began in 1997, four years before FieldCraft was registered as a South Australian business on 30 May 2001. The first product was a speed reading package called Stretch released in late 2001, followed by a security package called DrawBridge released in mid-2002. The security product kept the epidemic of self-loading email viruses that broke out in September 2002 out of systems where it was used. Other FieldCraft products include a postcode survey package, a blackjack systems analyser, a terminate-and-stay-resident manager, a trial locking program for VB6, a reusable IQ testing program, and a program for building unscripted interoperable standards-compliant drop-down web menus.

In 2004 FieldCraft published the General Public Electronic Mail Contract (GPEMC), or the General Public Electronic Mail License as it became known, for pro bono general public use in order to lay the foundation for class actions against senders of bulk unsolicited commercial email.

== Business economics ==
FieldCraft is economically rationalised, meaning that material capital expenditure is limited to existing funds already raised from profits accumulated after the deduction of applicable costs. This policy extends to prohibit contracting of ongoing services whose charges are not strictly activity based. By way of example, PayPal's merchant fees are strictly transaction based, whereas most Australian banks charge a number of fees on merchant accounts that have nothing to do with account activity – as a result, PayPal provides the merchant facilities for FieldCraft and not the banks. This kind of policy allows a business to idle during quiet times without incurring debt and makes for a very robust business model.

FieldCraft is a private business with no shares available to the public.
