= Ondangwa =

Town in Oshana Region, northern Namibia

- Town
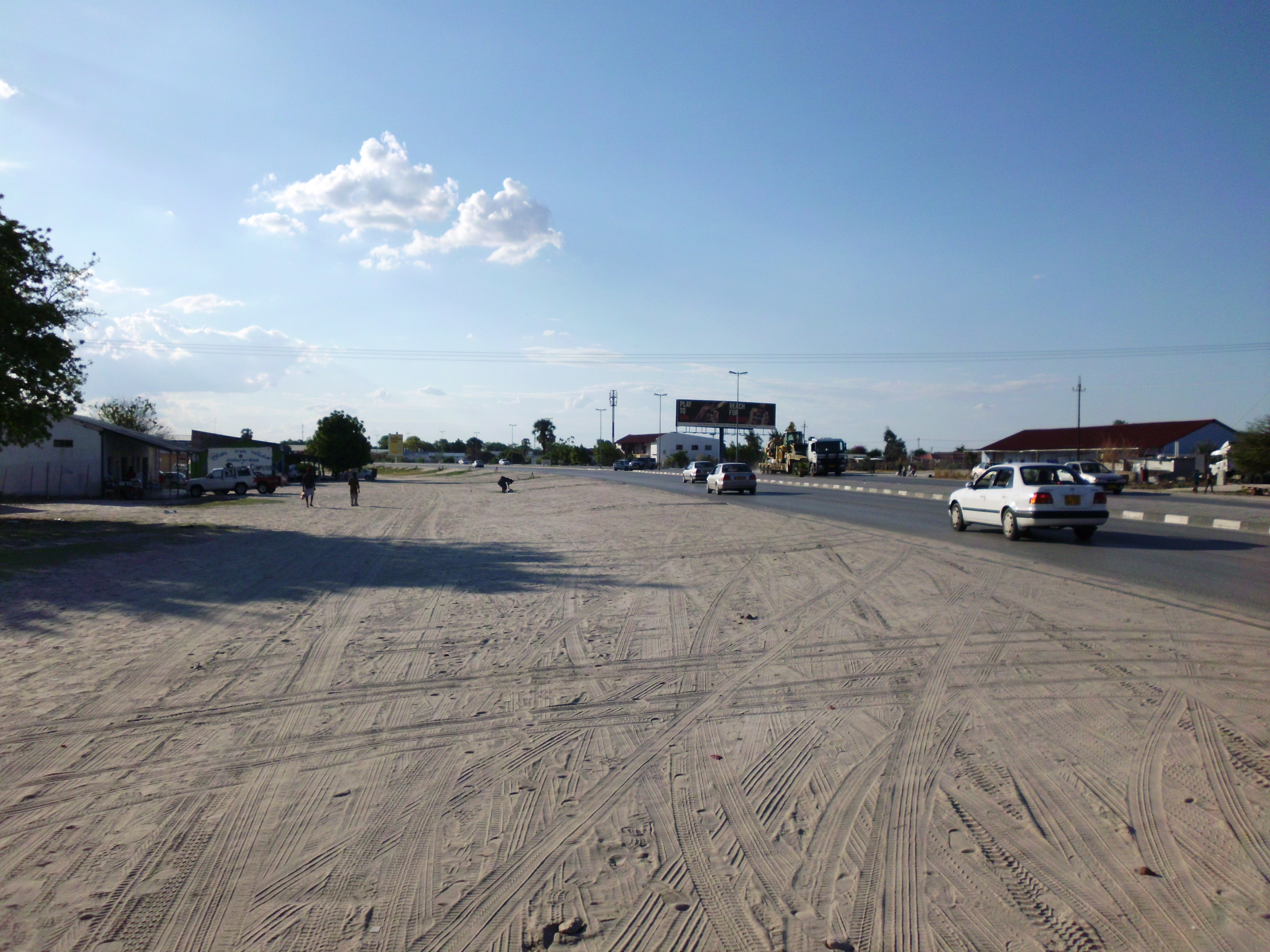
- Motto(s): "Your gateway to the North and beyond"
- Location in Namibia
- Coordinates: 17°54′49.49″S 15°58′41.53″E
- Country: Namibia
- Region: Oshana Region

Government
  - Type: Municipal council
  - Mayor: Paavo Amwele

Area
  - Land: 21.3 sq mi (55.1 km^{2})
- Elevation: 3,540 ft (1,080 m)

Population (2023)
  - Total: 30,364
  - Density: 1,430/sq mi (551/km^{2})
- Time zone: UTC+2 (SAST)
- Climate: BSh
- Website: http://www.ondangwatown.com/

Ondangwa (earlier spelling Ondangua) is a town in the Oshana Region of northern Namibia, bordering the Oshikoto Region. It had a population of 30,364 people in 2023.

Ondangwa was first established as a mission station of the Finnish Missionary Society (the FMS) in 1890. In 1914, it became a local seat of government. Today, Ondangwa is a fast-growing town and the district capital of the Ondangwa electoral constituency.

== Economy and infrastructure ==
Since independence, the government has promoted industry in the north of Namibia, to create jobs and improve the infrastructure. Rössing Foundation, Kayec and Cosdec are the three vocational skills schools training young people in building maintenance, sewing, cooking, and Internet Technology. The Oluno Correctional Facility in Ondangwa is one of Namibia's seven major prisons.

Ondangwa features various shopping centres, a large open market, and several tourist facilities. The shopping centres are Gwashamba mall, Yetu complex, Ondangwa Industrial Park, Time Square Mall, Sun Square mall, Andimba Toivo yaToivo Complex, Three Sisters Mall and others. The local authorities for the Oshana and Oshikoto regions are based in the town, e.g. the Ministry of Education and the Police. The Onandjokwe State Hospital is situated nearby.

There are several schools in the town, among them Andimba Toivo ya Toivo Senior Secondary School. Some schools are far from the town - for instance Ekulo Senior Secondary School. There are many schools in Ondangwa, Heroes Private School, Nangolo Secondary School, Iihenda Secondary School and Ondangwa Secondary School. There is also Olukolo Primary School and Ondangwa Prof-Private School and many other. Apart from schools that offer full time classes, there are also schools which offer part time classes to learners who want to improve their grade 10 and 12 results. These are schools such as Elite and NAMCOL. NAMCOL centre also offers other programmes such as ICDL which trains students how to use computers and other ICT skills. The football team is KK Palace and Volcano.

=== Transport ===
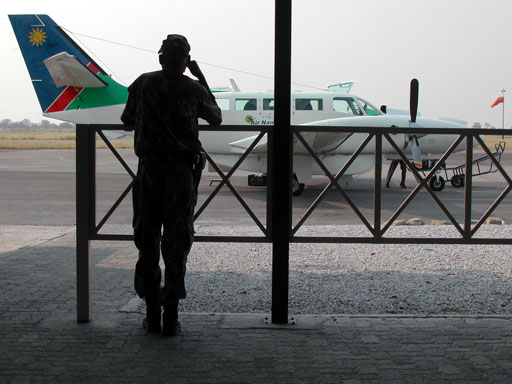
Ondangwa Airport

In 2001, planning started on a railway line to link Tsumeb with Ondangwa, with extensions to Angola planned to follow. The rail line had its first official service on 11 May 2006. The passenger train Omugulugwombashe Star traveled once a week back and forth between Windhoek and Ondangwa before it broke down due to climatic conditions.

Ondangwa Airport is linked to Oshakati and Oshikango by a tarred road.

== Geography ==
Ondangwa is located about 60 km (37 mi) from the Angolan border, along the B1 road. It is one of the places of residence of the Kings of Ondonga; the current King Eliphas Kauluma, father to the reigning king, lives here. Most of the residents of the town speak Oshindonga.

=== Demographics ===
Historical population
Year	Pop.	±% p.a.
2001	10,900	—
2011	22,822	+7.67%
2023	30,364	+2.41%

=== Climate ===
Ondangwa has a semi-arid climate (BSh, according to the Köppen climate classification), with hot summers and warm winters (with mild days and cool nights). The average annual precipitation is 448 mm (18 in), with rainfall occurring mainly during summer. In the unusual rainy season of 2010/2011 rainfall was over 1,000 millimetres (39 in), while in 2018/19 during the 2010s drought only 169 mm (6.7 in) of rain fell. On October 28, 2020, a maximum temperature of 43.2 °C (109.8 °F) was registered.

Ondangwa

Climate chart (precipitation, max. and min. temperature)
J	F	M	A	M	J	J	A	S	O	N	D
106 32 19	109 31 19	92 28 19	27 30 16	3 29 12	0 26 8	0 27 8	0 30 10	1 33 13	11 34 17	45 33 19	53 33 19
- █ Average max. and min. temperatures in °C
- █ Precipitation totals in mm
- Source: World Climate Guide
Imperial conversion
J	F	M	A	M	J	J	A	S	O	N	D
4.2 90 66	4.3 88 66	3.6 82 66	1.1 86 61	0.1 84 54	0 79 46	0 81 46	0 86 50	0 91 55	0.4 93 63	1.8 91 66	2.1 91 66
- █ Average max. and min. temperatures in °F
- █ Precipitation totals in inches

== Politics and government ==
Ondangwa is governed by a town council that has seven seats. Current challenges faced include the growing demand for housing due to rapid urbanisation, as well unemployment. TIPEEG, a government project to create jobs, is intended to assist in curbing unemployment in the town. The council has produced a development plan with guiding documents in the hope of facilitating investment. In order to combat the shortage of housing, the council has entered into a private-public partnership with Namibou, for the intended construction of roughly a thousand houses. It has also declared the aim of making the local government "an engine for sustainable development" in the region, and joined ICLEI in 2013.

Oshana Region, to which Ondangwa belongs, is a stronghold of Namibia's ruling SWAPO party. It won the first local election run after Namibian independence, the 1992 local elections, with 962 votes and gained six seats. The Democratic Turnhalle Alliance (DTA) came distant second with 179 votes and obtained the remaining seat. The 1998 local authority elections saw a similar result. SWAPO gained six seats (773 votes), DTA gained one seat with 98 votes.

In the 2015 local authority election SWAPO won by a landslide (2,582 votes) and gained six council seats. The remaining seat went to the Democratic Turnhalle Alliance (DTA) which gained 158 votes. SWAPO also won the 2020 local authority election. It obtained 1923 votes and gained four seats. The Independent Patriots for Change (IPC), an opposition party formed in August 2020, obtained 1,744 votes and gained three seats. Paavo Amwele is mayor of Ondangwa.

== History ==
Ondangwa is said to mean the end of the Ondonga area. (Ondonga is one of the kingdoms of Ovamboland), and Ondangwa is located on the western edge of this kingdom.

=== Finnish mission station ===
The Ondangwa mission station was founded by August Pettinen in 1890. It was located c. 15 kilometres (9.3 mi) northwest of the Olukonda mission station. At that time it was said that the distance was equal to two hours of travel on an ox cart.

Before Ondangwa was founded, the Finns had experienced a string of setbacks in the territories of other Ovambo tribes, i.e. in the kingdoms of Uukwambi, Ongadjera in the west and Oukwanyama in the north, and circumstances dictated that their work had to be concentrated in Ondonga. Even in Ondonga, the Finns could only work in the west, because in eastern Ondonga, Prince Nehale had been acting in an erratic and despotic way and thus made it impossible for foreigners to work or even survive there.

In August 1889 the Finns received news that Nehale was planning to kill them and to plunder the mission stations in his realm. The reason for this was that Nehale thought, incorrectly, that the Finns would have much ammunition that he could acquire. Pettinen had brought with him a couple of Christian families, and some of his servants were also Christians, so a small congregation existed in Ondangwa right from the beginning.

In 1898 the FMS sent Hilja Lindberg and Anna Rautanen, daughter of Martti Rautanen, to Ovamboland and Ondangwa. They were the first unmarried female missionaries in Ovamboland. Both had been given a chance to practice healthcare work at the Helsinki Deaconess Institute, as the plan was that they would be engaged in this line of work in Ovamboland. Lindberg was also going to teach Ovambo women how to spin and weave cotton.

However, the cultivation and processing of cotton turned out to require too much labour and water, and the results were not in a reasonable proportion compared with the amount of work required. Furthermore, the Ovambos were used to getting material from the Finns and were not motivated to produce their own material. This experiment thus had to be abandoned.

In 1900 the director of the FMS, Jooseppi Mustakallio, came to Ovamboland to inspect the mission field. One of the sites inspected was Ondangwa. He was in general happy with what he saw there.

When August Hänninen arrived in Ovamboland in 1904, Ondangwa became for a short time the most important place of health care there. Hänninen was not trained for medicare work, but as a conscript in the army he had worked as a surgeon's assistant, or some kind of a paramedic, and he was eager to continue in this line of work in Ovamboland. Indeed, he soon became known as a famous healer. August Pettinen reported that in 1905, when many kinds of epidemics ravaged Ovamboland, some 7,000 visits by patients had been made in Ondangwa. Even the following year there were 3,700 visits by patients. It appears that sometime after this Hänninen moved to Oniipa, where he used 4–5 hours daily for taking care of patients.

=== Armed conflict in Ondangwa ===
In February 1906, there was an armed conflict in the immediate vicinity of the Ondangwa mission station. The battle was connected to an attempted coup on Ondonga. The nephews of King Kambonde, Albin and Martin had been baptised and were next in line for the throne. Their aunt, Kambonde's sister Amutaleni incited them to kill the king. Even before this, the brothers had started to sort out things in Kambonde's realm, without the consent of Kambonde. When Albin decided that he would not continue to act against the king, his brother Martin assassinated him. This led into an armed conflict between the supporters of these two brothers. Circa 40 Ondonga men were killed in this conflict, and as a result of the affair, two other brothers, also in line for the throne, had to go into exile.

It seems that most people in Ondangwa lost their fortunes in this conflict, since in 1908 it was reported that the people in Ondangwa could not support their parish in any way whatsoever.

=== Administrative outpost ===
In early 1914 the Finns had abandoned the Ondangwa mission station. When the British took over South West Africa during World War I, they also came to Ovamboland and in 1915 chose Ondangwa as the location of their administration. On Christmas Day that year they hoisted the Union Jack in Ondangwa for the first time. The commander of the English was Major C. N. Manning, whose title was the Resident Commissioner.

In October 1915 Lieutenant C. H. L. Hahn arrived in Ovamboland. He was the grandson of Carl Hugo Hahn, raised by the son of the latter, Pastor Carl Hugo Hahn Jr., in Paarl, Cape Province. He worked in Ovamboland as the highest administrator for 30 years and had a great influence on the relations between the Finnish missionaries and the colonial administration.

The official status of the government station in Ondangwa was not sorted out until several years later, when in 1921 the government finally bought it from the Finns.

In 1945, towards the end of World War II, the South African government sent an Organizer of Native Education to Northern Namibia, to oversee school work in Ovamboland and Kavango. The first such organizer was D. R. Rootman, who was based in Ondangwa. Later this moved to Grootfontein, and the organizer visited Ovamboland once a year.

=== During Apartheid ===
Due to its strategic airport, Ondangwa became an important staging area for the South African Defence Force during its campaigns in neighbouring Angola. Local road and rail links were also improved by authorities to facilitate the rapid movement of military vehicles. Prior to 1970 the highway was unpaved beyond Otjiwarongo, by the end of the decade the tarmac extended through Ondangwa to Oshakati.

As the Namibian War of Independence intensified, Ondangwa became a target for the South West African People's Organization until South Africa's withdrawal from the region in 1990. During that time, Ondangwa was an important transit point for Owambo contract workers going to and from the copper and lead-mining town of Tsumeb, 270 kilometres (170 mi) southeast.

== Notable residents ==
- Eddie Amkongo
- Angelina Immanuel
- Nangolo Mbuba
- Paavo Amwele
- Sovita Joshua
- Alina Armas

== See also ==
- Transport in Namibia
- Railway stations in Namibia
- Airport
