= Onyaanya Constituency =

Electoral constituency in the Oshikoto region of northern Namibia

Coordinates: 18°04′11″S 16°15′08″E

Onyaanya constituency (red) in the Oshikoto Region

Onyaanya Constituency (until 1999 Okatope Constituency) is an electoral constituency in the Oshikoto Region of Namibia. It had 13,474 inhabitants in 2004 and 11,434 registered voters in 2020. The constituency office is located in the settlement of Onyaanya.

== Politics ==
Onyaanya constituency is traditionally a stronghold of the South West Africa People's Organization (SWAPO) party. In the 2004 regional election SWAPO candidate Henock Kankoshi received 6,329 of the 6,359 votes cast. He was subsequently elected to represent Oshikoto Region in the National Council of Namibia. Kankoshi was reelected in the 2010 regional elections and became governor of Oshikoto in 2015.

In the 2015 local and regional elections the SWAPO candidate won uncontested and became councillor after no opposition party nominated a candidate. The SWAPO candidate also won the 2020 regional election. Gideon Shikomba received 4,023 votes, well ahead of Onesmus Kapuka of the Independent Patriots for Change (IPC), a party formed in August 2020, who obtained 1,063 votes. In 2025 Hon Iyambo Nestor Shuuveni ( SWAPO PARTY) won the elections and received 5033 votes , succeeded Hon Namupala Paulus of (IPC) who obtained 566 votes.

== Education ==
- Amakali Combined School
- Uukule Cluster
- Northcote Academy
- Shine private school
- Oshiyagaya Combined School
- Iimanya Combined School
- Nehale Senior Secondary School
- Andimba Toivo yaToivo Senior Secondary School
- Olambo Junior Primary School

== Economy and infrastructures ==
The economic activity in the constituency is mainly on growing crops which is Mahangu while the main livestocks are goats, donkeys and cattles.

== See also ==
- Administrative divisions of Namibia
