= Oshikoto Region =

- Region
- Location of the Oshikoto Region in Namibia
- Coordinates: 18°31′S 17°06′E
- Country: Namibia
- Capital: Tsumeb (-2008), Omuthiya (2008-present)

Government
  - Governor: Sacky Kathindi

Area
  - Total: 38,685 km^{2} (14,936 sq mi)

Population (2023 census)
  - Total: 257,302
  - Density: 6.6512/km^{2} (17.227/sq mi)
- Time zone: UTC+2 (CAT)
- HDI (2017): 0.636 medium · 7th
- Website: oshikotorc.gov.na

Oshikoto is one of the fourteen regions of Namibia, named after Lake Otjikoto. Its capital is Omuthiya. Further major settlements in the region are Tsumeb, Otjikoto's capital until 2008, and Oniipa. As of 2020, Oshikoto had 112,170 registered voters.

== Geography ==
Oshikoto Region is named after Lake Otjikoto near its former capital Tsumeb.

Oshikoto is one of only three Namibian regions without either a shoreline or a foreign border. It borders the following regions:

- Ohangwena - north
- Kavango West - east
- Otjozondjupa - southeast
- Kunene - southwest
- Oshana - west

=== Demographics ===
The region's population has grown significantly over recent years, partly as a result of resettling / redistribution within the Oshiwambo-speaking area. Apart from Tsumeb and Oniipa, people have settled in a corridor along the trunk road, sometimes forming quite dense concentrations.

== Economy and infrastructure ==
The northern part of the region practices crop agriculture, whereas the main economic activities in the southern part are cattle rearing and mining. The two areas have important cultural and historical links in that the Ndonga people have extracted copper at Tsumeb since the earliest times in order to make rings and tools.

Pearl millet (Mahangu) is the principal crop in the north, while cattle are reared in the Mangetti and the Tsumeb district. Although the Tsumeb mine has only a limited life span, it provides a boost for the communal areas of the region together with the associated support industries and services.

Communication networks and infrastructure are well developed in the area: a paved trunk road runs across the region, linking it to both the south and the north of the country. The national microwave network terminates at Tsumeb, but telecommunications are now carried across the region and as far as Oshakati by means of a newly laid optical fiber cable.

According to the 2012 Namibia Labour Force Survey, unemployment in the Oshikoto Region is 26.4%. As of 2013 Oshikoto had 200 schools with a total of 60,439 pupils.

== Politics ==
Oshikoto constituencies (2014)

=== Constituencies ===
Oshikoto comprises eleven constituencies:

- Eengodi
- Guinas
- Nehale lyaMpingana (created 2013)
- Okankolo
- Olukonda
- Omuntele
- Omuthiyagwiipundi
- Onayena
- Oniipa
- Onyaanya (until 1999 Okatope Constituency)
- Tsumeb (until 1999 Oshikoto Constituency)

=== Regional elections ===
Electorally, Oshikoto is consistently dominated by the South West Africa People's Organization (SWAPO). In the 2004 regional election for the National Assembly of Namibia, SWAPO won all constituencies, and mostly by a landslide. In Eengodi no opposition party even nominated a candidate.

The 2015 local and regional elections saw SWAPO obtain 98.8% of the votes cast (2010: 95.6%) and win nine of the eleven constituencies uncontested . The remaining two constituencies were also won by SWAPO with majorities well over 80%.

Although SWAPO's support dropped to 73.2% of the total votes in the 2020 regional election it again won in all constituencies. Most of the non-SWAPO votes went to the upstart Independent Patriots for Change (IPC), an opposition party formed in August 2020.

=== Governors ===
- Penda Ya Ndakolo (2004–2015)
- Henock Kankoshi (2015–2020)
- Penda Ya Ndakolo (2020–2025)
- Sacky Kathindi (2025–)

== Demographics ==
As of 2023, Oshikoto is home to 257,302 inhabitants. In the general population, women outnumber men, with 98 males per 100 females. The population is majority rural, with only 18.3% living in urban settlements. The population density is 6.7 people per km^{2}. 6% of residents are not Namibian citizens. There are 60,643 private households, averaging 4.1 members. The population is growing at an annual rate of 2.9%, with a fertility rate of 4.4 children per woman. 14.7% is under 5, 24.8% 5-14, 31.9% 15-34, 20.3% 35-59, and 8.3% over 60.

=== Marriage status ===
27.8% of the adult population has been married, either with certificate (18.6%), traditionally (2.9%), in a consensual union (2.2%), divorced (0.9%), or widowed (2.9%). The population generally marries older, with only 0.8% of the current youth population married before age 18.

=== Education and employment ===
The literacy rate has decreased from 2011 to 85.2%. 22.2% percent of pre-primary youth attend Early Childhood Development (ECD) programs. The maximum level of educational attainment is mostly primary (46.2%), with only 20.8% pursuing secondary education and 8.5% pursuing tertiary education. 12.3% has no educational attainment. 33.3% of inhabitants earn a wage or salary as their primary source of income, 18.3% receive an old-age pension, 23.6% rely on farming, and 8.3% are involved in non-farming business.
