= List of schools in Namibia =

As of 2022, Namibia has 1,947 primary and secondary schools, up from 1,723 schools in 2013. These schools cater for a total of 822,574 pupils (2013: 24,660 teachers, 617,827 pupils). Most of the country experiences a shortage of schools, school hostels, and classroom space.

Many Namibian schools are built in a uniform design that was suggested by the Chilean-born (turned Swedish citizen) architect Gabriel Castro, in the 1990s.

== Primary and secondary schools ==
The Government of Namibia keeps a list of all registered private and government schools in the country.

=== A–C ===
- A. Shipena Secondary School, Katutura, Windhoek, Khomas Region
- A. A. Denk Memorial School, Kalkrand, Hardap Region
- Acacia High School, Windhoek
- Academia Secondary School, Khomasdal, Windhoek, Khomas Region
- All Nations Christian Primary School, Windhoek, Khomas Region
- Amakali Combined School, Amuteye, Onyaanya Constituency, Oshikoto Region
- Amazing Kids Private School, Windhoek, Khomas Region
- Ambunda Primary School, Oniiwe B, Oshikoto Region
- Amen Combined School, Onihadhila, Oshikoto Region
- Andimba Toivo ya Toivo Senior Secondary School (formerly: Oluno Senior Secondary School), Ondangwa, Oshana Region
- Angra Pequena Senior Secondary School, Lüderitz, ǁKaras Region
- Ankambo Primary School, Ankambo village, Okaku constituency
- Anna Maasdorp Primary School, Duineveld, Hardap Region
- Arandis Primary School, Erongo Region
- Ashipala Junior Secondary School, Onatshiku, Omusati Region
- Atlantic Junior Secondary School, Swakopmund, Erongo Region
- Andreas Haingura Kandjimi Primary School, Rundu, Kavango East
- Auas Primary School, Katutura, Windhoek, Khomas Region
- Augustineum Secondary School, Khomasdal, Windhoek, Khomas Region (until 1890: Otjimbingwe, Erongo Region until 1968: Okahandja, Otjozondjupa Region)
- Bet-El Primary School, Katutura, Windhoek, Khomas Region
- Blouberg Primary School, Kalahari Constituency, Omaheke Region
- Bloukrans Primary School, Dordabis, Khomas Region
- Bukalo Primary School, Katima Mulilo, Zambezi Region
- Bunya Combined School, Bunya, Kavango West
- Brandberg Primary School, Uis. As of 2017 the school had 279 pupils.
- Braunfels Agricultural High School, Outjo Constituency, Kunene Region
- C. Spellmeyer Junior Secondary School (founded 1944, closed 2008)
- Cabatana Private School, Oshakati, Oshana Region
- Canisianum Roman Catholic High School, Anamulenge, Omusati Region, established as a Catholic school, first provisionally at Okatana in 1971, and moved to Outapi in 1972. Closed in 1977 due to the Namibian War of Independence and taken over by the Namibian government at Independence of Namibia, housing a junior secondary school. Returned to the Catholic Church in 2003, and reopened as a private school in 2004. It was the fourth-best school in the country in 2013 and 2014
- Caprivi Senior Secondary School, Katima Mulilo, Zambezi Region
- Centaurus Secondary School, Windhoek, Khomas Region
- Charles Anderson Combined School, Ongwediva, Oshana Region
- Chief Hosea Kutako Primary School, Aminuis, Omaheke Region
- Chinchimane Combined School, Chinchimane, Zambezi Region
- C. J. Brandt Secondary School, Katutura, Windhoek, Khomas Region
- Combretum Trust School, Windhoek, Khomas Region
- Concordia College, Windhoek, Khomas Region
- Constantia Private Combined School, Windhoek, Khomas Region
- Cornelius Goreseb Senior Secondary School, Khorixas, Kunene Region
- Cosmos High School, Windhoek, Khomas Region

=== D ===
- Da-Palm Senior Secondary School, Otjimbingwe, Erongo Region
- Dagbreek School for the Intellectually Impaired, Windhoek, Khomas Region, established 1970. In 2026 the school had 244 places.
- Danie Joubert Combined School, Mariental, Hardap Region
- Daweb Junior Secondary School, Maltahöhe, Hardap Region
- Daweb Primary School, Maltahöhe, Hardap Region
- Dawid Bezuidenhout High School, Windhoek, Khomas Region
- David Sheehama Senior Secondary School, Outapi, Omusati Region
- De Duine Secondary School, Walvis Bay, Erongo Region
- Delta Primary School Windhoek (DSW), Windhoek, Khomas Region
- Delta Secondary School Windhoek (DSSW), Windhoek, Khomas Region
- Deutsche Höhere Privatschule Windhoek (DHPS), Windhoek, Khomas Region
- Diaz Primary School, Lüderitz, ǁKaras Region
- Dibasen Junior Secondary School, Okombahe, Erongo Region
- Divundu Combined School, Divundu, Kavango East Region
- Don Bosco Primary School, Keetmanshoop, ǁKaras Region
- Donatus Secondary School, Otjiwarongo, Otjozondjupa Region
- Donkerbos Primary School, Donkerbos, Omaheke Region
- Dordabis Primary School, Dordabis, Khomas Region
- Dr Abraham Iyambo Senior Secondary School, before 2014 named Oshikunde Senior Secondary School, Oshikunde, Ohangwena Region
- Duinesig Combined School, Walvis Bay, Erongo Region
- Duneside Private High School, Walvis Bay, Erongo Region

=== E–G ===
- Edward ǀGaroëb Primary School, Anker, Kunene Region
- Ebenhaeser Primary School, Karibib, Erongo Region
- Eddie Bowe Primary School, Khorixas, Kunene Region
- Eemboo Combined School, Eemboo, Ohangwena Region
- Eendombe Combined School, Eendombe, Omusati Region
- Eengendjo Senior Secondary School, Omungwelume, Ohangwena Region
- Eengwena Primary School, Eenagwena, Omusati Region
- Eenhana Secondary School, Eenhana, Ohangwena Region
- Eexumba Combined School, Eexumba, Ohangwena Region
- Benjamin Hauwanga Combined School, Eenkalashe, Omusati Region
- Ehomba Combined School, Ehomba, Kunene Region
- Ekulo Senior Secondary School, near Omuthiya, Oshikoto Region
- Elakalapwa Combined School, Oikoto, Ohangwena Region
- Elamba Combined School, Tsandi, Omusati Region
- Elao Primary School, Okanghudi, Ohangwena Region
- ELCIN Nkurenkuru High School, Nkurenkuru, Kavango West
- Ella du Plessis High School, Windhoek, Khomas Region
- Elondo East Primary School, Tsandi, Omusati Region
- Eloolo Combined School, Eloolo, Oshana Region
- Eluwa Special School, Ongwediva, Oshana Region, a school for children with disabilities
- Emma Hoogenhout Primary School, Windhoek, established 1900
- Empelheim Junior Secondary School, Mariental
- Engombe Junior Primary School, Engombe, Oshana Region; established in 1996 by the community and corporate sponsors; since the building's roof blew off in 2013, instruction is given in tents
- Epako Junior Secondary School, Gobabis
- Epandulo Combined School, Onalunike, Oshikoto Region
- Epukiro Post 3 Junior Secondary School, Epukiro, Omaheke Region
- Epukiro Roman Catholic Primary School, Epukiro, Omaheke Region
- Erkki Tauya Junior Secondary School (formerly Nakayale Combined School), Nakayale, Omusati Region
- Eros Primary School, Windhoek, Khomas Region
- Eros School for Girls, a school for girls with learning difficulties, Windhoek, Khomas Region
- Erundu Combined School, Oshakati, Oshana Region
- Esheshete Combined School, Esheshete, Oshikoto Region
- Etalaleko Senior Secondary School, Okahao, Omusati Region
- Etanga Primary School, Etanga, Kunene Region
- Etosha Secondary School, Tsumeb, Oshikoto Region
- Etsapa Combined School, Etsapa, Ohangwena Region
- Dr Frans Aupa Indongo Primary School, Windhoek, Khomas Region
- Frans Frederick Combined School, Fransfontein, Kunene Region
- Friedrich Awaseb Senior Secondary School, Grootfontein, Otjozondjupa Region
- Gabriel Taapopi Senior Secondary School, Ongwediva, Oshana Region
- Gam Primary School, Grootfontein, Otjozondjupa Region
- Gam Secondary School, Gam, Otjozondjupa Region
- Gammams Primary School, Windhoek
- Gobabis Gymnasium Private School, Omaheke Region; was the third-best school in the country in 2014 (2013: rank 6)
- G. K. Wahl Combined School, Kalkfeld, Otjozondjupa Region
- Gobabis Primary School, Gobabis, Omaheke Region
- Goreangab Junior Secondary School, Windhoek, Khomas Region
- Gqaina Primary School, Okarukambe Constituency, Omaheke Region
- Groot Aub Junior Secondary School, Khomas Region
- Grootberg Primary School, Erwee, Kunene Region
- Grootfontein Agricultural College (GAC), Grootfontein, Otjozondjupa Region
- Grootfontein Secondary School, Grootfontein, Otjozondjupa Region
- Gustav Kandjii Junior Secondary School, Otjinene, Omaheke Region

=== H–K ===
- Hage G. Geingob High School, Windhoek, Khomas Region
- Haimbili Haufiku Senior Secondary School, near Eenhana, Ohangwena Region
- Haisisira Junior Primary School, Kavango West
- Hans Daniel Namuhuya Senior Secondary School, Ondando, Oshikoto Region
- Himarwa Ithete Secondary School, Mpungu, Kavango West
- Haudano Secondary School (formerly called Okalongo Senior Secondary School), Okalongo, Omusati Region
- Havana High School, Windhoek, Khomas Region
- Hedimbi Primary School, Eengodi Constituency, Oshikoto Region; established 1992; 154 pupils in 2013
- Helene Van Rhijn Primary School, Lüderitz, ǁKaras Region
- Heroes Private School, Oshigambo, Oshikoto Region
- Highlands Christian School, private school in Windhoek, Khomas Region
- Highline Secondary School, Greenwell Matongo, Windhoek
- Hoachanas A.M.E. Community Private Primary School, Hardap Region
- Hochland High School, Windhoek, Khomas Region
- Holy Cross Convent School, Windhoek, Khomas Region; established 1906
- Hoeksteen Primary School, Rosh Pinah, ǁKaras Region
- Immanuel Shifidi Secondary School, Windhoek, Khomas Region
- Iihenda Secondary School, Oshitayi, Ondangwa Urban constituency
- Iikelo Combined School, Iikelo, Epembe Constituency
- Iilyateko Combined School, Oshihiindongo, Omusati Region
- Iindangungu Combined School, Okaku Constituency, Oshana Region
- Iipumbu Senior Secondary School, Oshakati
- Isak Katali Combined School, Okasheshete, Omusati Region
- Izak Buys Junior Secondary School, Leonardville
- Isize Combined School, Katima Mulilo
- J. G. van der Wath Secondary School, Okahandja
- Jacob Basson Combined School, Bergsig, Kunene Region
- Jakob Marengo Secondary School, Khomasdal, Windhoek; established 1985 as an alternative, learner-centerer school; named after freedom fighter Jakob Marengo; catered for close to 1,000 learners in grades 10–12; one of few Namibian schools where learners are not required to wear school uniform
- Jan Jonker Afrikaner High School, Katutura, Windhoek, Khomas Region
- Jan Möhr Secondary School, Windhoek, Khomas Region
- John Alphons Pandeni Combined School, Omundjalala, Outapi, Omusati Region
- P.J. Tsaitsaib Combined School, Hoachanas, Hardap Region
- Reverend Juuso Shikongo Senior Secondary School, Onankali, Oshikoto Region
- Kalkfeld Primary School, Kalkfeld, Otjozondjupa
- Kamwandi Combined School, Henties Bay, Erongo Region
- Karibib Junior Secondary School, Erongo Region
- Karibib Primary School, Karibib, Erongo Region
- Karibib Private School, Karibib, Erongo Region
- Kandjimi Murangi Secondary School, Nkurenkuru, Kavango West
- Karasburg Primary School, Karasburg, ǁKaras Region
- Karuci Primary School, Ndiyona, Kavango East
- Karukuta Primary School, Karukuta, Kavango East
- Karundu Primary School, Otjiwarongo, Otjozondjupa Region
- Kasivi Combined School, Kasivi, Kavango West
- Kauluma Combined School, Ongula, Ohangwena Region
- Keendawala Junior Secondary School, Tsandi, Omusati Region
- Kephas Muzuma Primary School, Otjikavare, Kunene Region
- Khomas High School, Windhoek West
- Khomasdal Primary School, Windhoek, Khomas Region
- Klein Aub Special School, Hardap Region
- Klein Aub Primary School, Hardap Region
- Kolin Foundation Secondary School, Arandis
- Kongola Combined School, Kongola, Zambezi Region
- Kuisebmond Secondary School, Walvis Bay, Erongo Region

=== L–N ===
- Leevi Hakusembe Senior Secondary School, Sizongoro, Kapako Constituency
- Linus Shashipapo Secondary School, Shinyunwe, Rundu Rural
- Linyanti Combined School, Linyanti Constituency, Zambezi Region
- Liselo Combined School, Liselo, Katima Mulilo Rural, Zambezi Region. In 2023 the school had 741 learners and 24 teachers.
- Mangetti Dune Primary School, Tsumkwe Constituency, Otjozondjupa Region. It mainly caters to the marginalised San community. The school had 363 learners and has 14 teachers in 2014, and was the constituency's best performing primary school. The school buildings are part of a converted military base.
- Mariental Primary School, Mariental
- Marmer Primary School, Aus
- Maria Mwengere Secondary School, Kayengona, Rundu Rural
- Martin Luther High School, Okombahe
- Martin Ndumba Combined School, Divundu
- Martti Ahtisaari Primary School, Wanaheda, Windhoek. Established 1991 as Wanaheda Primary School, renamed 1997 after Martti Ahtisaari, head of UNTAG
- Maurits Devenish Private Primary School, Ongwediva
- Mbongolo Primary School, Etapaela, Tsandi Constituency
- Monica Geingos Secondary School, Otjiwarongo
- Môreson Special School for the Cognitively Impaired, Windhoek, Khomas Region. In 2026 the school had 214 places.
- Moses ǁGaroëb Primary School, Windhoek
- Motsomi Primary School, Corridor 13, Aminuis, Omaheke Region
- Mphe Thuto Primary School, Tsjaka, Omaheke Region
- Mumbwenge Combined School, Ombalamumbwenge, Oshikoto Region
- Mwaala High School, Tsandi
- Mwadikange Kaulinge Secondary School, Ondobe
- Mwadinomho Combined School, Ondeihaluka, Ohangwena Region
- Mweshipandeka High School, Ongwediva
- Nailenge Primary School, Oshali, Endola Constituency
- Nambula Combined School, Elondo East, Tsandi Constituency
- Namib High School (1913–1918: Städtische Realschule mit Grundschule, 1919–1929: Swakopmund Primary School, 1930–1945: Reformrealgymnasium, 1946–1975: Swakopmund High School, 1976–1980: Deutsche Schule Swakopmund, 1981–1997: Deutsche Oberschule Swakopmund), Swakopmund, Erongo Region
- Namibia Primary School, established 1988 as Namibian English Primary School. Katutura, Windhoek, Khomas Region
- Nanghonda Combined School, Ongha, Endola Constituency
- Ndiyona Combined School, Ndiyona, Ndiyona Constituency
- Negumbo Senior Secondary School, Onaanda, Elim Constituency established in 1999
- Nehale Senior Secondary School, Onayena
- Noordgrens Secondary School, Rundu
- Nossob Primary School, Omaheke Region
- Northcote Private School, Oniipa
- Nuuyoma Senior Secondary School, Oshikuku, Omusati Region
- Ntara Combined School, Ntara, Musese Constituency
- Nyangana Combined School, Nyangana, Ndonga Linena Constituency
- Nyondo Combined School, Ndiyona, Ndiyona Constituency

=== O ===
- Odibo Combined School, Odibo, Ohangwena Region
- Oikango Combined School, Ohakweenyanga, Ompundja Constituency
- Oipya Primary School, Etameko, Engela Constituency
- Ongenga Junior Secondary School, Ongenga, Ongenga Constituency
- Ongenga English Private Primary School, Ongenga, Ongenga Constituency
- Onghwiyu Combined School, Onghwiyu, Oshikunde Constituency
- Okaepe Project School. Okaepe, Okakarara Constituency
- Okakarara Senior Secondary School
- Okashandja Combined School, situated 8 kilometres (5.0 mi) south of Ondangwa in the Uukwiyu Constituency. Established in 1937 by Finnish missionaries. In 2010 the school had 16 teachers and 460 learners, about half of them orphans or otherwise vulnerable children.
- Okathitu Combined School, Okathitu kalyoshandi, Tsandi Constituency
- Okomakwiya Junior Primary School, Okomakwiya, Onesi Constituency
- Okondjatu Combined School, Okondjatu, Okakarara Constituency
- Okaleke Combined School, Elim, Elim Constituency
- Olambo Junior Primary School, Olambo, Onyaanya Constituency
- Olupaka Combined School, Outapi
- Olupale Combined School, Omaakuku, Omuthiyagwiipundi Constituency
- Omakondo Combined School, Omakondo, Omulonga Constituency
- Omagongati Combined School, Omagongati, Eheke circuit, Ondangwa Rural Constituency
- Omaruru Primary School, Omaruru
- Omatjete Primary School, Omaruru
- Ombombo Combined School, Ombombo, Epupa Constituency
- Ombome Combined School, Ombome, Onesi Constituency
- Ombuga Combined School, Ombuga Hamunyoko, Oshakati West
- Ombahe Primary School, Tsandi Constituency
- Ombundu Combined School, Ombundu, Onyaanya Constituency
- Omuhaturua Primary School, Otjimanangombe, Epukiro Constituency
- Omutse Combined School, Omutse, Onyaanya Constituency
- Omuthiya Iipundi Senior Secondary School, Omuthiya
- Omuulukila Primary School, Outapi
- Onaholongo Combined School, Outapi
- Onakalunga Combined School, Onakalunga, Omundaungilo Constituency, Ohangwena Region, established in 1995.
- Onakasino Junior Primary School, Onakasino, Omuthiyagwiipundi Constituency
- Onamukulo Combined School, Onamukulo, Omulonga Constituency
- Onamunhama Combined School, Onamunhama, Ondobe Constituency
- Onamutene Combined School, Onamutene, Onayena Constituency
- Onangolo Secondary School, Onangolo, Epembe Constituency
- Onangholo Combined School, Outapi
- Onankali-North Combined School, Omahenge, Eenhana Constituency
- Onankali-South Combined School, Onankali, Onyaanya Constituency
- Onangwe Combined School, Onangwe, Omulonga Constituency
- Onampadhi Primary School, Onampadhi, Oniipa Constituency
- Onathinge-North Combined School, Onathinge, Oniipa Constituency
- Onathinge-South Combined School, Onathinge, Onayena Constituency
- Onashitendo Primary School, Onashitendo, Tsandi Constituency
- Onesi Senior Secondary School, Onesi, Onesi Constituency
- Ongha Senior Secondary School, Ongha, Endola Constituency
- Ongolo Combined School, Eengolo, Ogongo Constituency
- Onguti Senior Secondary School, Okankolo, Okankolo Constituency
- Oniihwa Combined School, Onayena
- Oniiwe Primary School, Onayena
- Ontoko Combined School, 40 kilometres (25 mi) west of Outapi in Ontoko, Onesi Constituency
- Onyika Junior Secondary School, Oshikuku
- Opuwo Primary School, Opuwo. As of 2017 the school had 39 teachers and 1,200 learners.
- Orange Combined School, Orange, Okalongo Constituency
- Oranjemund Private School
- Orban Primary School, Windhoek
- Orwetoveni Primary School, Otjiwarongo
- Oshakati Senior Secondary School
- Oshali West Combined School, Oshali West, Endola Constituency
- Oshidute Combined School, Oshidute, Epembe Constituency, Ohangwena Region
- Oshigambo High School, Oshigambo
- Oshikulufitu Combined School, Outapi
- Oshilemba Combined School, Oshilemba, Onesi Constituency
- Otjikondo School Village, Otjikondo, Kunene Region. A primary school where learners board throughout the year, founded 1991. This school was Kunene's best performing school between 2009 and 2011.
- Otjikojo Primary School, Otjikojo, Opuwo Rural. The school was started in 2015 and inaugurated in 2017. As of 2019 it has 183 learners and 10 staff.
- Otjiwarongo Secondary School, Otjiwarongo
- Oupili Combined School, Oupili, Oshikunde Constituency
- Outjo Secondary School, Outjo

=== P–S ===
- P.K. De Villiers Secondary School, Keetmanshoop, ǁKaras Region
- Pahangwashime Combined School, Oipanda, Endola Constituency
- Petrus ǃGaneb Secondary School, Uis. This school offers grades 8 to 12 to currently 295 learners from grades 8 to 12. The school was built before Namibian independence; its facilities are old and dilapidated.
- Petrus Vries Primary School, Khauxas, Hardap Region
- Pionier Boys' School, Windhoek, Khomas Region
- Pionierspark Primary School, Windhoek, Khomas Region
- Paresis Secondary School, Otjiwarongo
- Primary School Baumgartsbrunn, Khomas Region
- Putuavanga Senior Secondary School, Opuwo
- Rietquelle Junior Secondary School, Rietquelle, part of Aminuis, Omaheke Region
- Rocky Crest Senior Secondary School, Windhoek
- Roman Catholic Mokaleng Combined School, Aminuis, Omaheke Region
- Romanus Kamunoko Senior Secondary School, Rundu
- Rosh Pinah Academy, a secondary school in Rosh Pinah
- Ruacana Vocational Secondary School, Ruacana
- Rucara Combined School, Rucara, Ndiyona Constituency
- Rukongo Vision School, Divundu, Kavango East Region; first vision school of Namibia; established 2013
- Rundu Secondary School (RSS), Kavango Region
- Rupara Combined School, Rupara, Musese Constituency
- Sanjo Senior Secondary School, Bukalo, Zambezi Region
- Schmelenville Combined School, Bethanie
- Shaanika Nashilongo Secondary School, Okahao, Omusati Region
- Shikeva Combined School, Ohangwena
- Shikongo Iipinge Senior Secondary School, Tsandi, Omusati Region
- Sakaria Shikudule Combined School, Oshali, Endola Constituency
- Shitemo Combined School, Ndonga Linena Constituency
- Simataa Secondary School, Chinchimane, Zambezi Region
- Singalamwe Combined School, Singalamwe, Kongola Constituency
- St. Andrews Primary School, primary school in Windhoek's Khomasdal suburb
- St Boniface College (SBC), Kavango Region
- St Barnabas Anglican Church School, part of St Barnabas, Windhoek, destroyed in the 1960s when Windhoek's Old Location was closed for Blacks.
- Saint Charles Lwanga High School, Outapi
- St. George's Diocesan School, Windhoek
- St. Joseph's Roman Catholic High School, Döbra, Khomas Region
- St. Mary's Odibo High School, Odibo, Ohangwena Region
- St. Paul's College, Windhoek, Khomas Region
- Suiderhof Primary School
- Swakopmund Christian Academy (SCA), Swakopmund, Erongo Region
- Secondary School Swakopmund (SSS), Swakopmund, Erongo Region

=== T–Z ===
- Tanben College, Windhoek West
- The International School of Walvis Bay
- The University Centre for Studies in Namibia (TUCSIN), Windhoek, Khomas Region
- Tobias Hainyeko Project School, Windhoek
- Tsau ǁKhaeb Secondary School, Rosh Pinah
- Tsandi Primary School, Tsandi
- Tsaraxa-Aibes Combined School, Otjiwarongo
- Tsintsabis Combined School, Tsintsabis
- Tsumkwe Primary School, Tsumkwe
- Tsumeb Gimnasium Private School, Tsumeb
- Tulihongeni Combined School, Engela Constituency
- UN Nghaamwa Secondary School (formerly Omungwelume Secondary School), Omungwelume, Ohangwena Region. The school had 493 pupils in 2023.
- Uukule Senior Secondary School, Onyaanya Constituency, Oshikoto Region
- Uutsathima Combined School, Uutsathima, Okahao Constituency, Omusati Region, situated 80 kilometres (50 mi) from Okahao. A school predominantly for San people with 12 teachers and more than 300 pupils.
- Uuyoka Combined School, Uuyoka
- Waapandula Primary School, Omuthiya, Oshikoto Region
- Waldorf School Windhoek
- Walvis Bay Private School, Walvis Bay, Erongo Region
- Wennie Du Plessis Secondary School, Gobabis, Omaheke Region
- Willem Borchard Primary School, Okombahe
- Windhoek Afrikaanse Privaatskool
- Windhoek Gymnasium Private School, Windhoek, Khomas Region
- Windhoek High School (WHS)
- Windhoek International School (WIS)
- Windhoek Technical High School, Windhoek, Khomas Region

== See also ==
- Education in Namibia
- List of universities in Namibia (includes technical schools)
- List of buildings and structures in Namibia
- Lists of schools
