= List of universities in Namibia =

A list of universities in Namibia.

There are four institutions in Namibia considered universities:

1. University of Namibia (UNAM) (State)
2. International University of Management (IUM) (Private)
3. Namibia University of Science and Technology (NUST, formerly the Polytechnic of Namibia) (State)
4. Welwitchia University (WU, formerly known as the Welwitchia Health Training Center) (Private) (Note: Welwitchia Health Training Centre, established 2013, trains nurses, healthcare and social workers, and medical administrative staff. Headquartered in Windhoek, campuses in Kombat, Nkurenkuru, Katima Mulilo and Walvis Bay. It became a full university in 2024.)

== Vocational training institutions ==
Most of the vocational training in Namibia is delivered by Vocational Training Centres (VTCs) controlled by the Namibian Training Authority (NTA). There are seven VTCs in Namibia:

1. Eenhana Vocational Training Centre, Engela, Ohangwena Region
2. Nakayale Vocational Training Centre, Outapi, Omusati Region
3. Okakarara Vocational Training Centre, Okakarara, Otjozondjupa Region. The OVTC has 50 staff and about 600 students.
4. Rundu Vocational Training Centre, Rundu, Kavango West
5. Valombola Vocational Training Centre, Ongwediva, Oshana Region
6. Windhoek Vocational Training Centre, Windhoek, Khomas Region
7. Zambezi Vocational Training Centre, Katima Mulilo, Zambezi Region
8. Ngato Vocational Training Center, Rundu, Kavango West

There are few other vocational training institutions in Namibia. Some of the artisan training is done by the Namibia University of Science and Technology.

- Namibia Institute of Mining and Technology (NIMT) in Arandis trains professions such as boilermakers, electricians, fitters and diesel mechanics. It is funded by De Beers and subsidized by the Namibian government.
- Namibian Maritime and Fisheries Institute (Namfi) in Walvis Bay, founded in 1996, provides vocational training for maritime industries.
- Institute for Domestic Science & Agriculture in Baumgartsbrunn, established in 1991, is an institution not accredited by the Namibia Qualifications Authority. It provides training for domestic workers.
- I-Care Health Training Institute, established 2017, trains nurses and healthcare workers. Campuses are in Windhoek, Swakopmund and Oniipa.

== See also ==
- Education in Namibia
- List of schools in Namibia
