= Shikongo Iipinge Senior Secondary School =

Secondary school in Namibia

Location
- Tsandi, Omusati Region; Namibia

Information
- Established: 1985; 40 years ago
- Founder: Chris Iipinge
- Teaching staff: 20
- Enrollment: 442

Shikongo Iipinge Senior Secondary School is a school in Tsandi in the Omusati Region in Namibia. Currently, it has 442 students and 20 teachers. It was founded by Chris Iipinge, circuit inspector and first principal of the school, in 1985.

== See also ==
- List of schools in Namibia
- Education in Namibia
