= Olupaka Combined School =

- Outapi Constituency, Omusati Region; Namibia

Information
- Established: 1951; 74 years ago

Olupaka Combined School is a school in Eyanda village in Outapi Constituency in northern Namibia. The school was founded in 1951 by the Roman Catholic Mission and became a state school in 1972. The school patron is Chief Justice Peter Shivute; former Namibian president Sam Nujoma is its goodwill ambassador.

== See also ==
- List of schools in Namibia
- Education in Namibia
