= Onamunhama Combined School =

School in Onamunhama in northern Namibia

- Onamunhama, Ohangwena Region; Namibia

Onamunhama Combined School is a school in Onamunhama in the Ohangwena Region of northern Namibia. It was established during colonial time.

== See also ==
- Education in Namibia
- List of schools in Namibia
