= Centaurus Secondary School =

High school in Windhoek, Namibia

Coordinates: 22°35′11″S 17°5′39″E

Location
- Windhoek; Namibia

Information
- Type: High school
- Established: 23 January 1962; 63 years ago

Centaurus Secondary School is a high school in Windhoek, the capital of Namibia. It was founded on 23 January 1962 and started with 175 learners transferred from Windhoek High School.

== See also ==
- List of schools in Namibia
- Education in Namibia
- List of universities in Namibia
