= Haimbili Haufiku Senior Secondary School =

Secondary school near Eenhana, northern Namibia

Haimbili Haufiku Senior Secondary School is a school at east of Eenhana town in the Ohangwena Region of Namibia. It was established in 1988. R.M.O Shaninga is the current principal of the school. bHaimbili Haufiku was named after the eighth Oukwanyama, King Haimbili yaHaufiku, who ruled from 1811 until 1858.

Haimbili Haufiku Senior Secondary School is one of the best schools countrywide. Its learners frequently get awards for high performance, and in 2025 Haimbili Haufiku senior secondary school ranked as the best overall winner of (STEM), A competition sponsored by the Bank of Namibia. The school occupied rank 13 in the national A-level results in 2012, and rank 16 in 2013. Haimbili Haufiku scooped 50 certificates during the 2022 Ohangwena region annual award ceremony held in July 2023.

== See also ==
- List of schools in Namibia
- Education in Namibia
