= Secondary School Swakopmund =

School in Swakopmund in the Erongo Region of central Namibia

Swakopmund Secondary School

Location
- Swakopmund; Namibia; 22°40′12″S 14°31′35″E

Information
- Type: Government school
- Motto: Ad unum omnes (To one and all)
- Opened: 1976
- School district: Swakopmund
- Principal: Samuel Sinvula
- Grades: 8 - 12 (AS-level)
- Color: Blue
- Nickname: SSS
- Website: www.swakopsecondary.com

Swakopmund Secondary School is a school in Swakopmund in the Erongo Region of central Namibia. Established in 1976 It is one of the oldest schools in Erongo Region.

The school taught in German and Afrikaans before Namibian Independence but has since changed to English as the medium of instruction.

Before 1976, Swakopmund had only one secondary school, the Swakopmund High School, today known as the Namib High School. Increased learner enrolment and the introduction of a German medium secondary school led to the establishment of SSS. The school opened in January 1976 as a dual medium school. During that period, it was not strange to have an Afrikaans-speaking teacher teaching a class of mainly German-speaking learners through the medium of English. At its inception, SSS was unique in the sense that it offered English, Afrikaans and German as first languages. The first principal, Mr. Hanjo J. Böhlke had 33 staff members to assist in teaching 563 learners. Mr. Böhlke was at the helm of SSS until 1980. Mr E. Genis was principal between 1981 and 1986. The integration of SSS as a school offering tuition to Namibian learners from all walks of life was overseen by Mr JF Staden, the principal from 1987 to 1994. Mr. EM Manga, the current Deputy Director of Life-Long Learning at the Erongo Regional Directorate, became the principal in 1995 and maintained the proud history of excellence at SSS. He was succeeded by Mr L Visagie. At its 40th year of existence in 2016, SSS was led by Mr SSS himself - Mr. Sinvula Sebastian Sibanga. He has five Heads of department and 40 staff members, teaching over 1100 learners.

As of 2017 it has 1,600 learners and 45 staff.

== Sports ==
The school has a local rivalry with Coastal High School, particularly in football. They meet in the annual FNB Classic Clashes. As of 2016, SSS has won all the matchups. The school also won the 2005 Erongo Coca-Cola Youth Cup.

== Alumni ==
•Big Ben Kandukira

•Veikko Nekundi

== See also ==
- Education in Namibia
- List of schools in Namibia
