= Shaanika Nashilongo Secondary School =

School in Okahao in Namibia

Information
- Former name: Ongandjera Secondary School
- Established: 1947; 78 years ago
- Teaching staff: 31
- Enrollment: 661

Shaanika Nashilongo Secondary School is a school in Okahao in the Omusati Region in Namibia. The school was founded in 1947 as a mission school of the Finnish Missionary Society. Previously named Ongandjera Secondary School, it has 31 teachers and 661 learners.

== See also ==
- List of schools in Namibia
- Education in Namibia
