= Ontoko Combined School =

Location
- Omusati Region, Namibia
- Coordinates: 17.452313°S 14.627562°E

Ontoko Combined School is a school in the Omusati Region in northern Namibia. It is situated 2 kilometres (1.2 mi) south of Epalela and 40 kilometres (25 mi) west of Outapi. The school lies within an area occupied by marginalised communities, particularly Ovahimba, Ovahumbi, Ovazemba, Ovandongona, and Ovangambwe. It had 792 learners in 2015. School patron is Niilo Taapopi, former CEO of the City of Windhoek.

== History ==
In the year 2012, New Era reported that Ontoko Combined School had improved its performance compared with earlier results. The media describing it as a "most-improved school" after being a poor performer, although the school community still faced challenges three years later.

== See also ==
- List of schools in Namibia
- Education in Namibia
