= Mumbwenge Combined School =

School in Namibia

Mumbwenge Combined School is a school in the village of Ombalamumbwenge in the Oshikoto Region of northern Namibia. It is situated 5 kilometres (3.1 mi) from Oshigambo along the road between Eenhana and Ondangwa.

Witchcraft and superstition are common in rural northern Namibia. The school became known nationwide in 2005 when pupils claimed to see supernatural beings and started screaming and fainting during classes. On different days during the school term altogether 40 learners, most of them girls, fell in a trance-like state after being approached by "Satan". Although the Namibian Ministry of Education issued a statement condemning the practice, villagers have engaged the Church, witchdoctors and traditional authorities to cleanse the school. The incidents had reportedly stopped a year later.

== See also ==
- Education in Namibia
- List of schools in Namibia
