= Ella du Plessis High School =

Ella Du Plessis High School

Location
- Windhoek; Namibia
- Coordinates: 22.5452°S 17.0443°E

Information
- Type: Government school
- Opened: 1964
- School district: Khomasdal, Windhoek: Khomas Region Namibia
- Principal: First Principal: A.J.F Kloppers
- Feeder schools: Khomasdal and Katutura

Ella Du Plessis High School is a school in the Khomasdal suburb of Windhoek, the capital of Namibia. It was established in 1964 by Andrew John Fred Kloppers, who was also the first principal of the school. He started the school with only 52 learners in the Old Location, an area of Windhoek where today the suburb of Hochland Park is situated. The school was named after the wife of Mr. A.H. du Plessis, the administrator of the S.A. government in South West Africa. Ella du Plessis was the first non-racial government school of South West Africa, and it was for the poor and the deprived. The school has had various principals since its inception. Following Mr. A.J.F Kloppers were principals of note such as Mr. Hartung, Mr. Willa Fielies, Mr. Adolf De Klerk, Mr Edson, Mr Hansen, Mr Seth January as well as Mr. Clement Kloppers the son of Mr. Andrew Kloppers who served from 1992 to 2002, Mr Seth Januarie was principal from 2002 until his retirement in 2012, and since then Mr. J. Kavari occupies this position with great distinction. Today, Ella du Plessis has a learner population of 1050 and 37 teachers.

In 1978, the school moved to its current premises where it is situated at the corner of Viserend and Gladiola Streets. It became a fully fledged high school with approximately 900 learners. The motto of the school is Per ardua ad astra, which in Latin means "through adversity to the stars" or "through struggle to the stars". Educationally and on the sports field the school was benchmarked against other non white schools such as Dr. Lemmer High School in Rehoboth and Suiderlig High School in Keetmanshoop. The schools sources its learners from the Khomasdal and Katutura communities.

== See also ==
- Education in Namibia
- List of schools in Namibia
