= Negumbo Senior Secondary School =

School in Omusati Region of northern Namibia

Location
- Onaanda, Omusati; Namibia
- Coordinates: 17.8961°S 15.3477°E

Information
- Established: 1999; 27 years ago

Negumbo Senior Secondary School is a state high school in Onaanda in the Omusati Region of northern Namibia. It is situated 50 km west of Oshakati. Negumbo was founded in 1999, and was officially opened by president Sam Nujoma on 3 June 1999. The school is named after the late King of Uukwambi, Negumbo lyaKandenge, who killed a lion near the location where the school now stands.

Negumbo is one of the best-performing schools in Omusati Region and the country at large. It was the sixth-best school in the country in 2014 (2013: rank 5). Negumbo Senior Secondary has a record of having 100% of its students passing Grade 10 national examinations for 10 consecutive years, and winning awards in most subjects. Many students undertake tertiary education in Namibia and abroad.

The school is equipped with computers and a biology laboratory. It is also known for its strong soccer team.

== Sources ==
- Shivute, O., (23 June 2008). "Negumbo SSS Celebrates 10th Anniversary of Existence". Namibia Broadcasting Corporation. Retrieved 21 September 2012
- "Old Mutual Sponsor Far North Championship". The Namibian 20 July 2011. Retrieved 25 September 2012.
