= Windhoek International School =

School in Windhoek, Namibia

Windhoek International School (WIS)
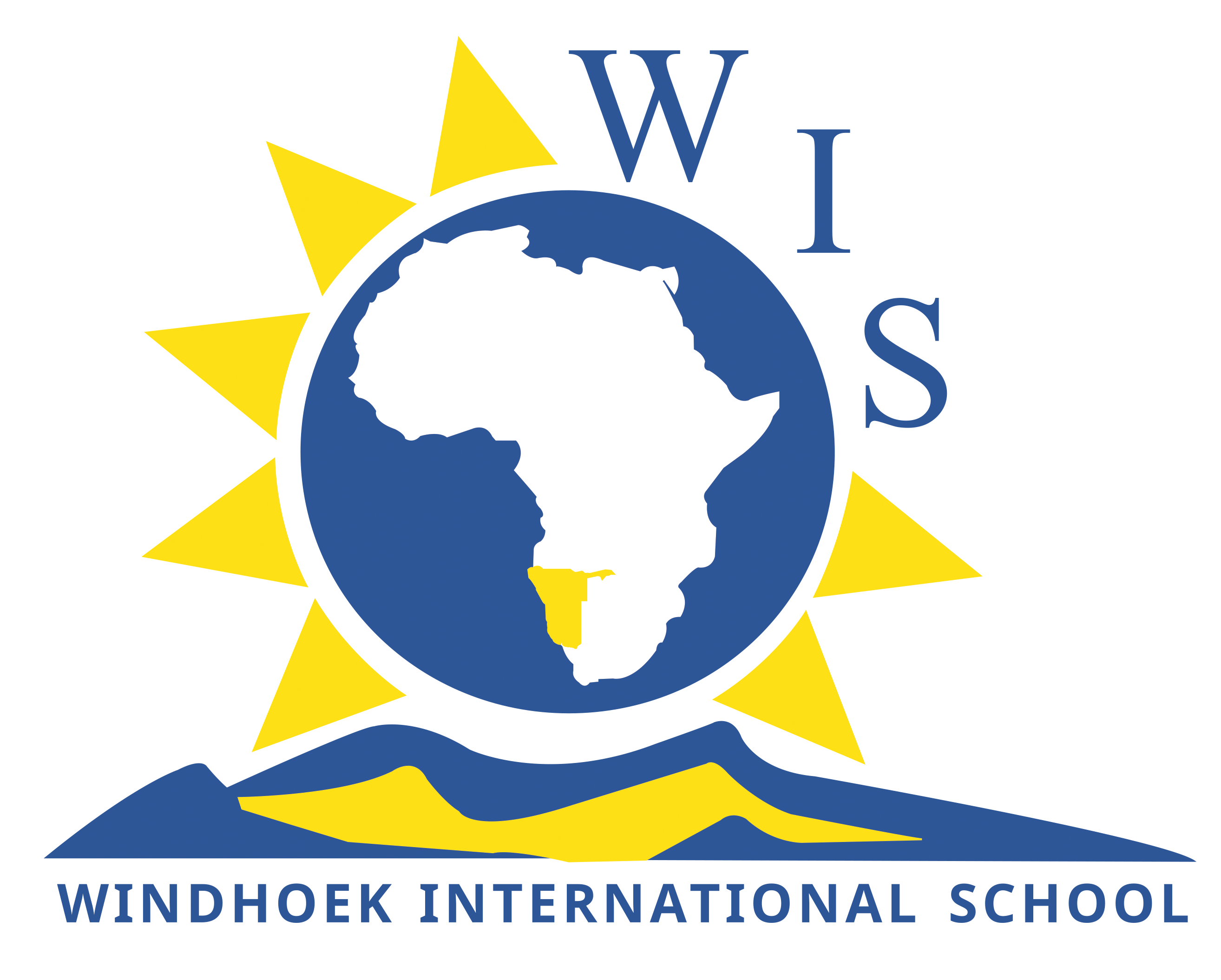

Location
- Scheppmann Street, Pioneers Park; Khomas; Windhoek; Namibia; 22°35′0″S 17°3′25″E

Information
- Type: Independent Co-educational
- Motto: An International Community of Learners
- Established: 1990
- Superintendent: Ethan Van Drunen
- Principals: Margarete Reiff
- Principal: Jason Bentley
- Faculty: 90
- Age range: 3-19
- Enrolment: 420 (2026)
- Education system: [IB Primary Years Programme], [IB Middle Years Programme], [IB Diploma Programme]
- Language: English
- Hours in school day: 7
- Campus type: Suburb
- Houses: Lions, Leopards, Cheetahs, Caracals
- Colors: Blue & Yellow
- Sports: Basketball, Volleyball, Soccer, Athletics, Netball
- Website: www.wis.edu.na

Windhoek International School (known locally as the International School or WIS) is an independent, co-educational, international school located in Windhoek, Namibia. The school provides education from Kindergarten (age 3) through to Grade 12. It offers the IB Primary Years Programme and IB Diploma Programme as well as the International Baccalaureate (IB) Middle Years Programme (MYP) .

As an IB World School it is the only school in Namibia to offer International Baccalaureate programmes and is one of the first schools worldwide to be authorised to offer these programmes. The school also boasts an international community of students from 45 countries. Unlike other schools in Namibia, the International School's school year runs from mid-August to mid-June.

== History ==
The Windhoek International School was founded by the Nielsen family in 1990, the same year Namibia achieved independence. The family were working for the United Nations in Windhoek and wanted to establish a school whose ethos was openness, free expression, democratic values and international understanding. At its inception the school had no campus and shared campuses with other schools. The school moved into purpose-built facilities in 1994.

As of 2026, it is the most expensive private school in Namibia.

== Campus ==
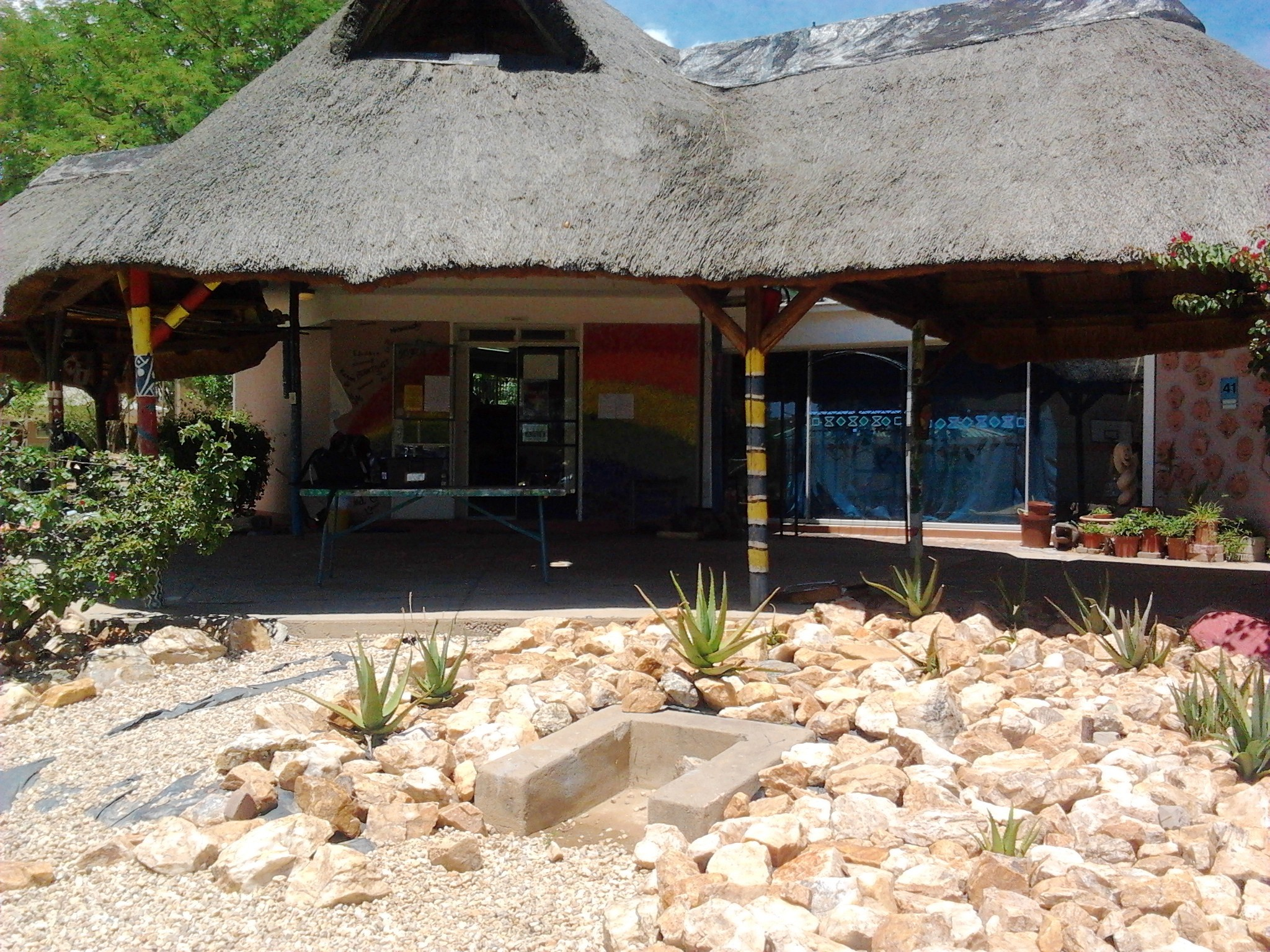
The thatched art classes at the Windhoek International School have been decorated by students.

The Windhoek International School campus is exceptionally large compared to other schools in Windhoek. The unique shape and layout of the structures were designed to resemble that of an African Village. The classrooms, labs and other buildings are arranged in clusters of green-roofed hexagonal buildings. These clusters are distributed over a wide area and connected by bricked paths covered mostly by corrugated iron shading.

The campus includes on-site sports facilities including a football pitch and a smaller grass field which is used for volleyball and other sports, a PE hall with an indoor basketball court and athletics and gymnastics equipment, an outdoor half court for streetball and full-sized basketball and netball court. It has two libraries, an IT Lab, a Design Lab and Science Labs with advanced scientific equipment for students studying experimental sciences at the IB level. The school administration building is located in the centre of the campus and a large parking area has been built on the grounds.

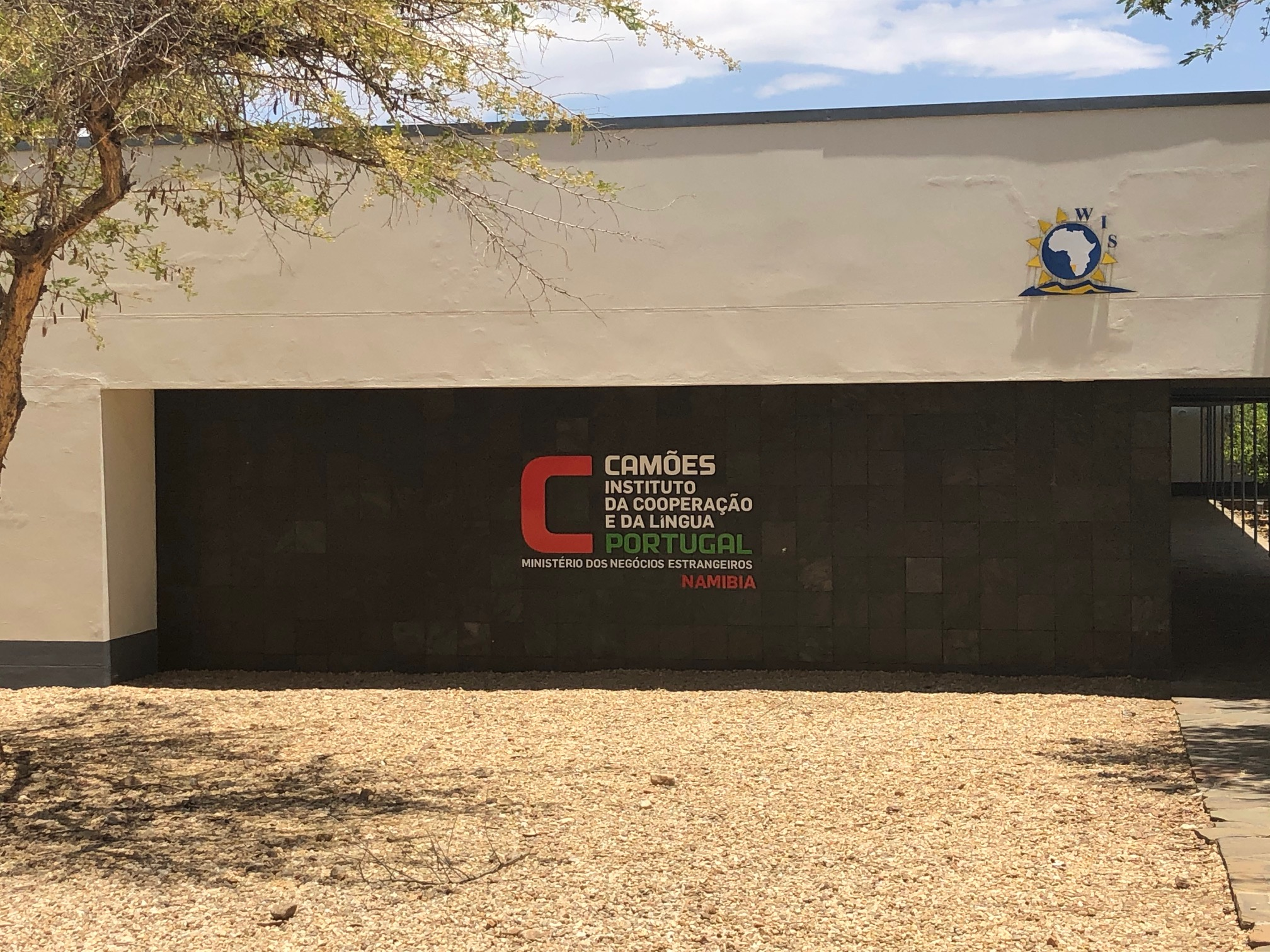
Diogo Cão Portuguese Language and Community Centre at the Windhoek International School.

The school hosts the Diogo Cão Portuguese Language Centre which contains the classrooms for foreign language subjects, a media centre and an auditorium for the whole school. The Language Centre also provides Portuguese language classes and other activities after school hours. The school has a 2km hiking and bicycling trail located and the campus is enclosed by secure perimeter fencing.

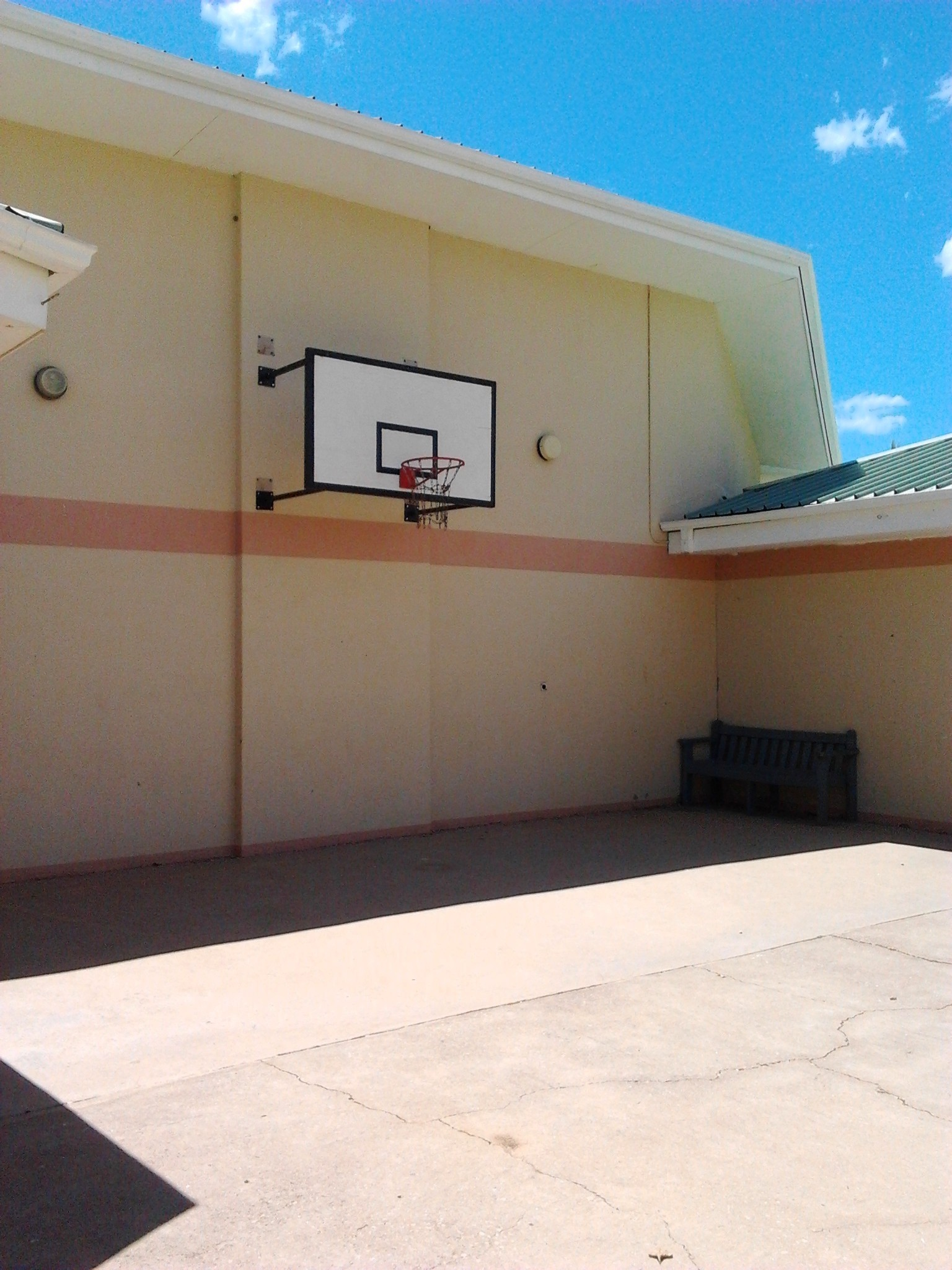
The Windhoek International School's sports facilities include an outdoor half court for playing streetball.

== Curriculum ==
The Windhoek International School is an IB World School and is the only school in Namibia to offer International Baccalaureate programmes. In contrast with other Namibian schools which offer the Namibian Senior Secondary Certificate, the International School offers a variety of International Curricula that it believes better suit its international community of students. The school offers different curricula for different year groups, as shown in the table below:

Year Group	Curriculum	External Moderation
Early Years 1 - Grade 5	IB Primary Years Programme	None
Grade 6 - 8	WIS Middle School Programme	None
Grade 9 - 10	IGCSE	University of Cambridge
Grade 11 - 12	IB Diploma Programme	International Baccalaureate

The Middle School Programme in Grade 6 - 8 transitions students from primary school to secondary school, and prepares them for the International General Certificate of Secondary Education.

== Accreditation ==
In addition to being an IB World School, Windhoek International School is also an accredited affiliate of the Council of International Schools, the New England Association of Schools and Colleges, and the Association of International Schools in Africa.

== See also ==
- Education in Namibia
- List of schools in Namibia
