= Nehale Senior Secondary School =

Public secondary school in Onayena, Namibia

Location
- Onayena, Oshikoto Region; Namibia; 17°56′51″S 16°12′07″E

Information
- Type: Public secondary school
- Motto: Education crown of future
- Established: 1976
- School district: Onayena
- Principal: Johny Nakanyala
- Grades: 8–12
- Colours: Blue and white
- Website: www.facebook.com/nehalehighschool

Nehale Senior Secondary School (also styled Nehale SSS) is a public secondary school at Onayena in the Oshikoto Region of Namibia. It opened in 1976 and is among the older secondary schools in the former Ovamboland. The school is named after King Nehale lya Mpingana of the Ondonga people. It stands about 20 kilometres east of Ondangwa and offers grades 8 to 12.

It is a cluster centre for schools in the Onayena constituency and falls under the Onathinge education circuit. Streams taught at the school include commerce, science, natural science and social studies. School colours are blue and white.

== History ==
The school was founded in 1976, during South African administration of South West Africa. It is named for Nehale lya Mpingana, the Ondonga king who led an attack on the German fort at Namutoni in 1904. Former principal Elifas Iimene headed the school in the early 2010s; Johny Nakanyala was later recorded as principal.

== Academics ==
The school has long been regarded locally as one of the stronger public secondary schools in Oshikoto, after Oshigambo High School. In the 2014 Junior Secondary Certificate (JSC) examinations it recorded a 100 per cent Grade 10 pass rate, with 87 learners obtaining 25 points or more. Mathematics teacher Simon Albin said 55 learners obtained an A in JSC mathematics that year, 15 a B and 17 a D, which the school treated as its first such mathematics result. The school marked the result with a candidates' award ceremony.

== Facilities ==
Most funding comes from the state. A 2012 report in the Namibian Sun described the campus as largely unrenovated since the colonial period and listed a broken sewerage system, shortage of teacher housing, inadequate laboratories and the absence of a proper hall as the main defects. The school later used a main hall for events, including a Miss Nehale sports tournament that drew neighbouring schools. It operates a hostel and is classed among Namibia's boarding schools.

== COVID-19 ==
In 2020 the Oshikoto education directorate suspended teaching at the school after more than 170 confirmed COVID-19 cases.

== Notable people ==
People associated with the school include:

- Peya Mushelenga, cabinet minister
- Johannes Nakwafila, SWAPO councillor for Epembe Constituency
- Tunakie, musician

== Cluster schools ==
Schools grouped with Nehale in the Onayena / Onathinge cluster include:

- Uuyoka Combined School
- Oniihwa Combined School
- Onayena Junior Secondary School
- Oniiwe Primary School
- Onayena Primary School
- Joseph Simaneka Asino Secondary School
- Matheus Nashandi Combined School
