= Charles Anderson Combined School =

School in Ongwediva, Namibia

- Ongwediva, Oshana Region; Namibia

Information
- Established: 1999; 27 years ago
- Grades: 1-10
- Enrollment: c.800

Charles Anderson Combined School is a non-boarding government combined school in the Oshana Region of Namibia, founded in 1999 and situated in Ongwediva.

The building of the school was funded by the Swedish government. The school is named after Charles John Andersson. The school teaches about 800 students from grade 1 to grade 10.

== See also ==
- List of schools in Namibia
- Education in Namibia
