= Jan Jonker Afrikaner High School =

Jan Jonker Afrikaner

Location
- Windhoek; Namibia; 22.5252°S 17.0665°E

Information
- School type: Secondary School
- Established: 1981
- Enrollment: More than 800

Jan Jonker Afrikaner is a senior secondary school in Windhoek, the capital of Namibia. It is situated in the Katutura suburb, and is named for Jan Jonker Afrikaner, Captain of the Orlam Afrikaners in South West Africa.

Jan Jonker Afrikaner High School was established in 1981 and currently accommodates more than 800 learners. The school's colors are green and white. There are many extramural activities at the school, for instance sports and singing.

== See also ==
- Education in Namibia
- List of schools in Namibia
