= Alcino Izaacs =

Namibian rugby union player

- Full name: Alcino Marchiano Izaacs
- Born: 16 November 1993 (age 33) Windhoek, Namibia
- Height: 1.89 m (6 ft 2 1/2 in)
- Weight: 84 kg (13 st 3 lb; 185 lb)
- School: Namib High School, Swakopmund

Rugby union career
- Position: Winger / Fullback
- Current team: Boland Cavaliers
Youth career
- 2009–2010: Namibia
- 2012–2014: Sharks
Senior career
Years	Team	Apps	(Points)
2014–2015	Sharks XV	14	(5)
2016	Blue Bulls XV	11	(15)
2016	Eastern Province Kings	4	(10)
2017	Boland Cavaliers	14	(15)
- Correct as of 28 May 2018

Alcino Marchiano Izaacs (born 16 November 1993) is a Namibian rugby union player who most recently played with South African side the Boland Cavaliers. He can play as a winger or a full-back. He played for College Rovers in 2020, a popular rugby club in Durban where many semi-professional rugby players play. Rovers are arguably the strongest club in KZN. He currently plays for Namibia rugby club, Unam, as well as Namibian National Team.

== Career ==
=== Youth ===
While attending Namib High School in Swakopmund, Isaacs was selected to represent Namibia's Under–16 side at the 2009 Grant Khomo Week competition and in 2010 at the Under-18 Academy Week competition. He also played for Namibia in the Under–19 All-African Cup competition.

=== Sharks ===
He then moved to Durban, South Africa to join the Sharks Academy for the 2012 season. He represented the Sharks U19 side during the 2012 Under-19 Provincial Championship, scoring five tries in thirteen appearances for the side. He progressed to the Sharks U21 team over the next two seasons, weighing in with three tries in the 2013 Under-21 Provincial Championship and with four in the 2014 Under-21 Provincial Championship.

He also made his first senior appearances in 2014, playing in seven of the Sharks XV's matches during the 2014 Vodacom Cup. His debut came on 7 March 2014 against the Border Bulldogs in East London, starting as the left winger and helping his side to a 46–24 victory. He made two more starts and four appearances from the bench in their remaining fixtures as they topped the Southern Section of the competition, only to be eliminated by the Golden Lions in the Quarter Finals, with Izaacs playing all 80 minutes of their 20–27 defeat.
