= Ekulo Senior Secondary School =

School in Namibia

- Oshikoto Region; Namibia

Information
- Established: 1997; 28 years ago
- Grades: 8-12
- Enrollment: c.450

Ekulo Senior Secondary School is a school near Omuthiya in the Oshikoto Region of Namibia. It opened in 1997 and has around 450 learners from grades 8–12. Most of the learners stay in the hostel. Ekulo SSS was officially opened on 17 June 2000 by Sam Nujoma, then president of the Republic of Namibia.

== See also ==
- Education in Namibia
- List of schools in Namibia
