= Dibasen Junior Secondary School =

School in Namibia

Information
- Established: 1982; 43 years ago
- Teaching staff: 16
- Grades: 7-9
- Enrollment: c.360

Dibasen Junior Secondary School is a school in Okombahe, 60km west of Omaruru in the Erongo Region of central Namibia. It was founded in 1982 and has 16 teachers and about 360 learners in grades 7 to 9.

The school was the target of several arson attacks at the time of Namibia's transition into independence in the late 1980s and early 1990s. As a result of those politically motivated attacks, student numbers went down from 900 to 200. During an attempt to rebuild the school the remaining hostel blocks burned down in 2005. As of 2016 the ruins have neither been removed not rebuilt.

== See also ==
- Education in Namibia
- List of schools in Namibia
