= Academia Secondary School =

Location
- Windhoek; Namibia
- Coordinates: 22°36′32.75″S 17°3′58.43″E

Information
- School type: Secondary School
- Established: 22 January 1975
- Staff: 36
- Enrollment: 890

Academia Secondary School is a secondary school in Windhoek, Namibia. It is situated in the Academia suburb.

The school has a Model UN club that participated in the 2014 Model United Nations Namibia High School Conference.

== See also ==
- Education in Namibia
- List of schools in Namibia
