= NIMT =

NIMT may refer to:

- Namibian Institute of Mining and Technology
- North Island Main Trunk, a railway line in New Zealand
