= Otjiwarongo Secondary School =

School in Otjiwarongo, central Namibia

Coordinates: 20°27′51.26″S 16°38′49.03″E

Otjiwarongo Secondary School is a high school in Otjiwarongo, Namibia. It frequently produces good results compared to other schools in Namibia. In 2009 the biology, English, and mathematics results were among the best in the country. In 2012 Otjiwarongo Secondary School was the 23rd best-performing high school in Namibia; in 2013 it occupied rank 12.

== See also ==
- List of schools in Namibia
- Education in Namibia
