= Da-Palm Senior Secondary School =

Location
- Otjimbingwe, Erongo; Namibia

Information
- Grades: 8-12
- Enrollment: 480

Da-Palm Senior Secondary School is a rural school in Otjimbingwe in the Erongo Region of central Namibia. In 2014, it had been mentioned as the sixth best school in the Erongo Region.

Situated on the banks of the Swakop River, Da-Palm is a government boarding school that was established in 1982. It teaches pupils from grade 8 to 12, and has 480 learners.

== See also ==
- Education in Namibia
- List of schools in Namibia
