= Etosha Secondary School =

School in Namibia

- Afrikaans: Hoërskool Etosha

Information
- Established: 1964; 62 years ago
- Principal: Mr A. Kaishungu

Etosha Secondary School (Afrikaans: Hoërskool Etosha) is a school in Tsumeb in the Oshikoto Region of northern Namibia. It is one of the best academic performers in the northern regions and Namibia as a whole.

Founded in 1964, the school is now run by the current principal Mr A. Kaishungu and he has been the headmaster for almost 2 decades.

== See also ==
- Education in Namibia
- List of schools in Namibia
