= Linyanti =

Linyanti may refer to:

- Linyanti, a settlement in the Zambezi Region of Namibia
- Linyanti Combined School
- Linyanti Constituency
- Linyanti River
