= Erginus Endjala =

Namibian politician

Erginus Hihepaali Endjala, born at Ouhwaala in Omusati Region on March 25, 1969 (age 56) has been the Omusati Regional Governor since 2015. until 30 June 2025.

== Education ==
Endjala graduated from the Simon Bolivar Technikon College Pinar de Rio Cuba with a Bachelor in statistics and from Intec College where he graduated with Advanced Diploma in Human Resources. He is pursuing his MBA at Robert Kennedy College, Zurich, Switzerland, in partnership with Cambria University, United Kingdom.

== Career ==
He worked as a senior quality controller at Lalandji Fishing, as well as a senior quality controller at Robben Sea Food in Western Cape South Africa. He was a fleet assistant manager at Coastal Marine in Lüderitz and also worked as head of personnel department and assistant department head of human resources, Pescanova Fishing. He served as a SWAPO Party Youth League (SPYL) district coordinator before becoming a district coordinator.
