= Omaruru River =

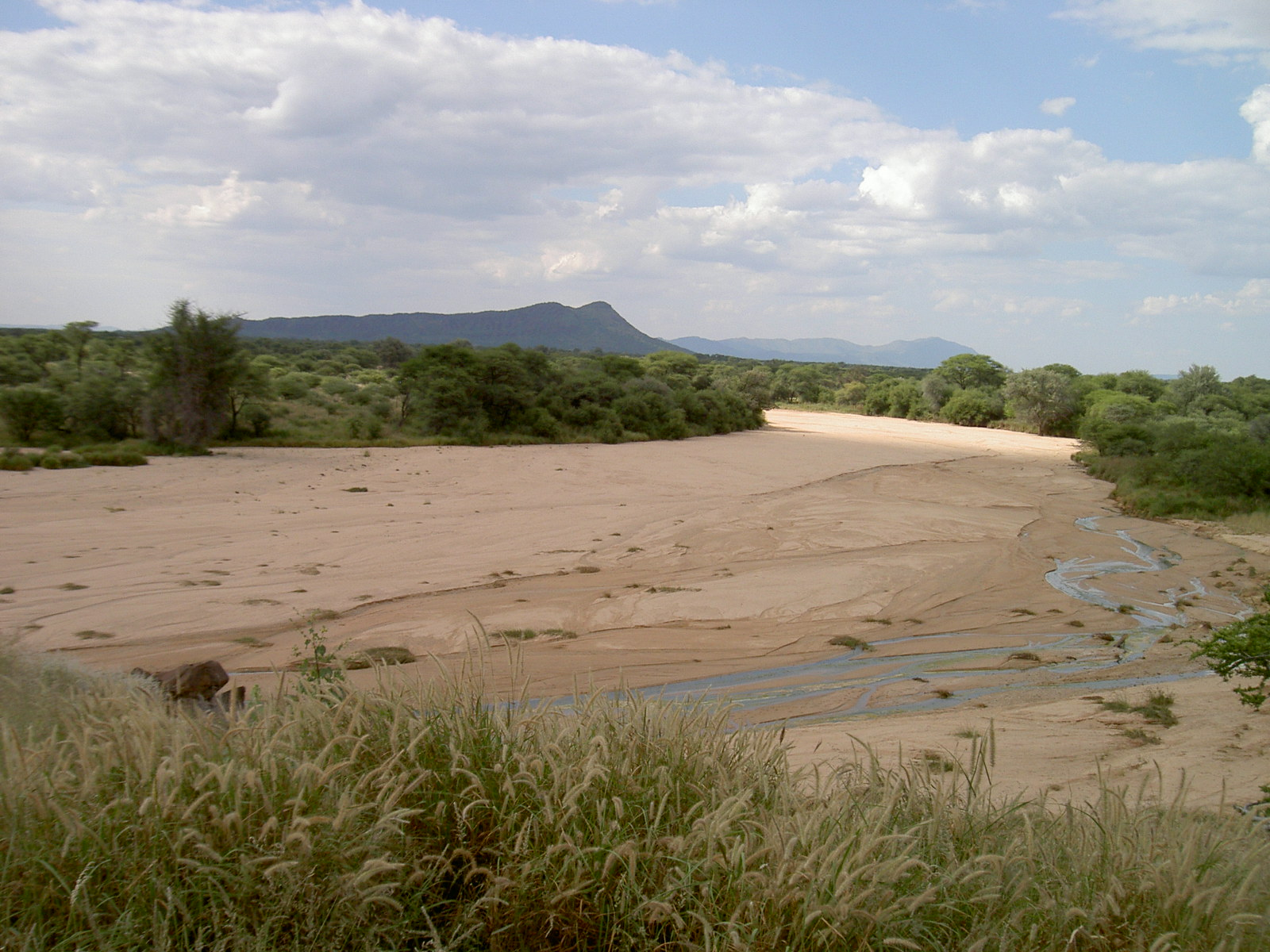
- Almost dried up bed of Omaruru River
- Native name: Khoekhoe: ǃKhuidiǁgams

Physical characteristics
- Source: Mount Etjo
  - location: Otjozondjupa Region
- Mouth: Atlantic Ocean
  - location: north of Hentiesbay, Erongo Region
  - coordinates: 22°05′S 14°14′E
  - elevation: 0 m (0 ft)
- Length: c.330 km (210 mi)
- Basin size: 13,100 km^{2} (5,100 sq mi)

Basin features
- Tributaries
  - left: Otjimakuru, Goab, Spitzkop
  - right: Leeu, Okandjou
- Waterbodies: Omdel Dam

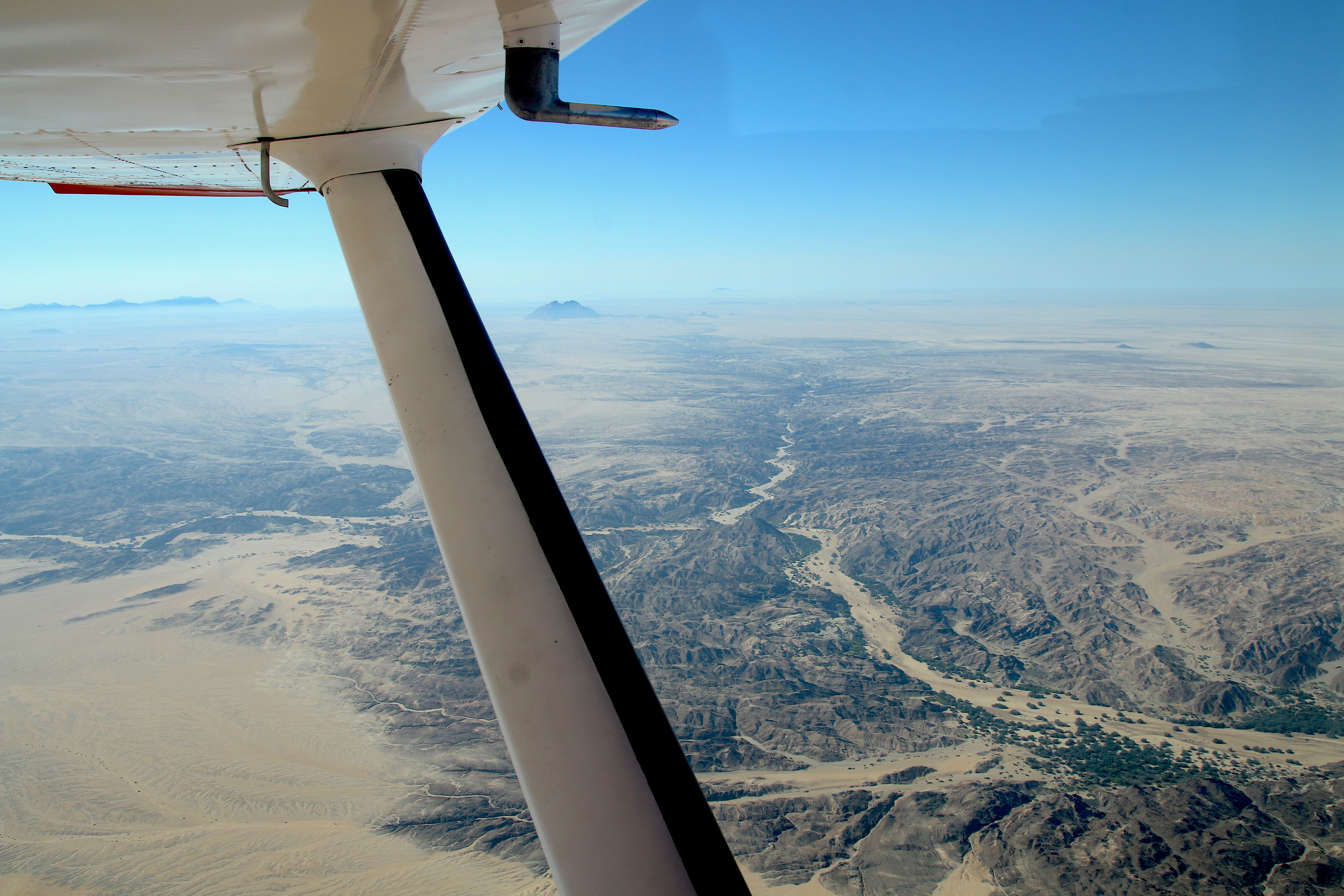
Aerial view of Omaruru River (2018)

The Omaruru River is a major river crossing the Erongo Region of western central Namibia from East to West. It originates in the Etjo Mountains, crosses the town of Omaruru and the village of Okombahe, and reaches the sea a few kilometers north of Henties Bay. Inflows of the Omaruru are Otjimakuru, Goab, Spitzkop, Leeu and Okandjou.

The Omaruru is an ephemeral river with a mean run-off of roughly 40 million cubic metres per annum. Its palaeochannels form an underground delta of the Namib Desert. Its catchment area (including its tributaries) is estimated to be between 11,579 and 13,100 square kilometres (5,100 sq mi).
