= Onamunhama =

- Settlement
- Location in Namibia
- Coordinates: 17°23′36″S 16°06′48″E
- Country: Namibia
- Region: Ohangwena Region
- Time zone: UTC+2 (South African Standard Time)
- Currency: Namibian dollar
- Languages: English, Afrikaans, German, Ovambo, local languages
- Religion: Roman Catholic

Onamunhama (IPA: [onam'n̥ana]) is a village in the Ohangwena Region in the north of Namibia in the Oukwanyama tribal area. It is the location of the former Anglican mission station of Holy Cross. The mission station was founded in 1927 ca. 20 kilometres east of the St. Mary Mission in Odibo, right on the Angolan border.

The former president of Namibia, Hifikepunye Pohamba completed his primary education in the Holy Cross Mission school in Onamunhama. Onamunhama Combined School is situated in the village. There is also an Anglican Church.
