= Holy Cross Convent School, Windhoek =

Holy Cross Convent School

Location
- Namibia
- Coordinates: 22.599°S 17.096°E

Information
- Type: Private school
- Motto: In Cruce Saulce
- Opened: 1906
- Principal: Mrs Kolberg (2009)
- Grades: 5 years - grade seven
- Colors: red, blue and yellow
- Website: School web site

The Holy Cross Convent School, short: Convent, is a school in Windhoek, the capital of Namibia. It is one of the oldest schools in the country.

== History ==
The Convent was established in 1906 as an Oblates of Mary Immaculate Catholic school for girls at the initiative of the German imperial administration.

Bishop Koppmann informed the Director of Education that as from the beginning of the 1977 school year, the Catholic Church would open their educational institutions to all population groups. The result of this move was the Education Department's withdrawal of the subsidy to the school. The German Catholics made up for the loss of subsidy by donating R15,000 annually to the school.

In 1979, CDM (Namdeb), donated R10,000 towards sports facilities which was used for new tennis courts.

The school was registered with the Department of National Education in 1982. From that time a quarterly subsidy was received. In 1985, the Holy Cross High School was closed.

In 2005 the school appointed Yasmin Agnew as principal. Agnew was the first lay principal in the school's history.

== Enrolment and activity ==
On the staff, there are 25 teachers; including Sisters. The school follows a curriculum legislated by the Namibian Ministry of Education.

Classes and Activities are: Mathematics, English, Afrikaans (2nd Language), German (foreign language), Physical/Natural Science, physical education, Social studies (History and Geography), Singing (gr. Pre-4) Musical Appreciation (gr. 5-7), Craft & Technology, Library, and Computer Studies in the morning hours.

Afternoon classes are optional and include: Choir, drama, library, swimming (summer), fitness (winter), percussion band (on an auditioning process), computer club, soccer, tennis, and girls' netball.

== See also ==
- List of schools in Namibia
