= Linyanti Combined School =

School in Namibia

Linyanti Combined School is a school in the Linyanti Constituency in Namibia's far north-eastern Caprivi Strip. It is situated about 80 kilometres (50 mi) west of Katima Mulilo and was established in 1945.

The school had 21 staff in 2012. Patron of the school is Namibia's president Nangolo Mbumba.

== See also ==
- Education in Namibia
- List of schools in Namibia
