= Eehongo =

- Country: Namibia
- Region: Ohangwena Region

Eehongo is a village in the Ohangwena Region of Namibia.
