= Mzee Kaukungwa =

Namibian politician (1919–2014)

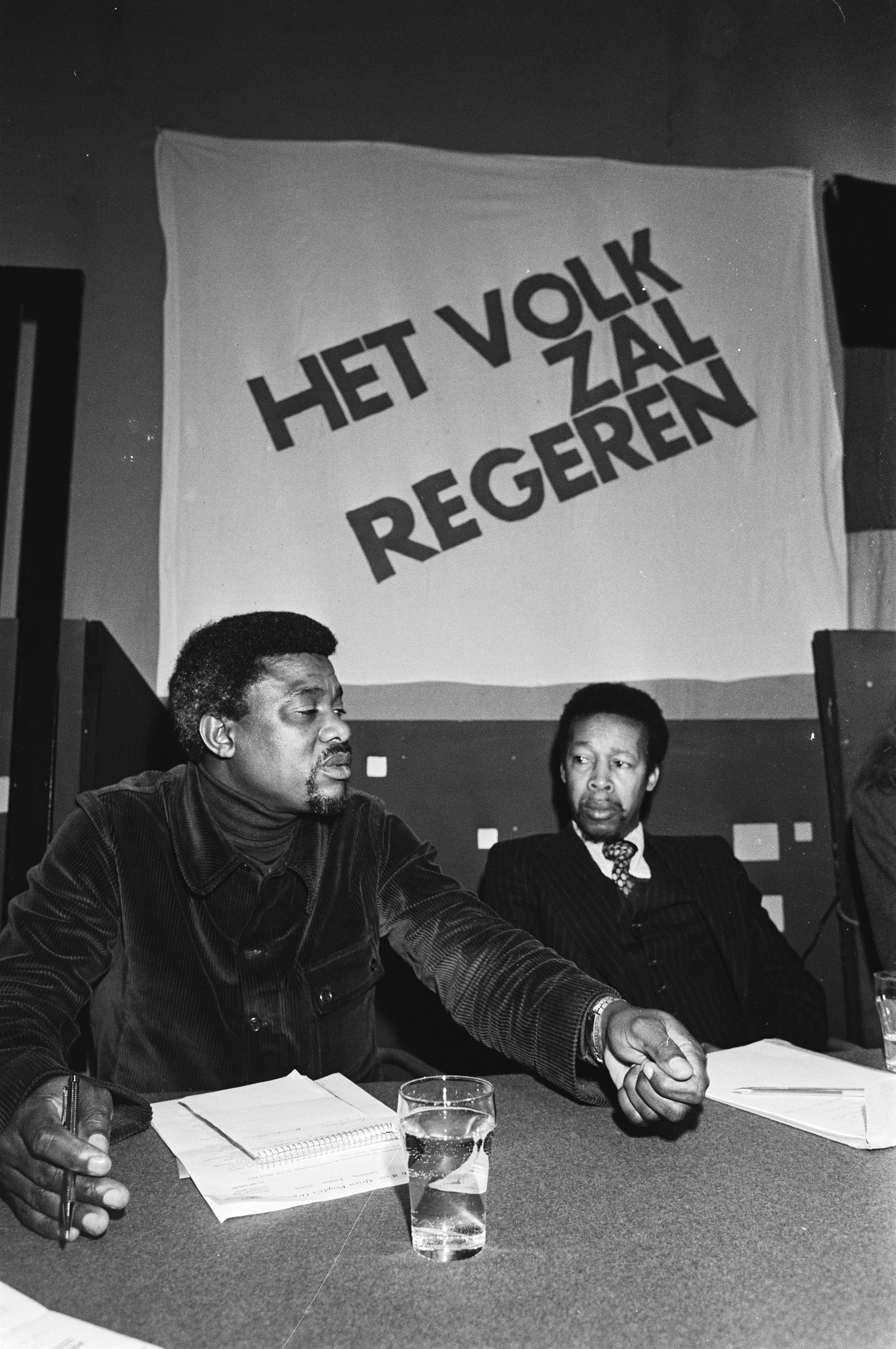
Kaukungua and Motsipe (ANC) in Amsterdam, 1981

Simon Hafeni "Mzee" Kaukungwa (6 October 1919 – 1 September 2014) was a Namibian politician and People's Liberation Army of Namibia (PLAN) veteran. and a founding member of SWAPO. He was born at Ohalushu village in Ohangwena Region, Ovamboland. In 2012, SWAPO opened an office in Ohalushu and named it after Kaukungwa.

== History ==
Kaukungua was born in Ohalushu village in the Ohangwena Region. He was the son of Reverend Nghishidumbi Nghoshi Sam Noah Kaukungwa ka-Shangheta and Hifikepunye Rebecca (Mee Nangolo). He was the third child in a family of 12 children. His siblings are Monica Ningaeendunge, Polly Nghoshi, the late Chief Setson Kamati, Naemi Kauna, Steven Shapua, Meriam Silvia Aishe-Oiwa and Helvi Ndapewoshali Nanghelo. He attended primary school at Ohalushu Finnish Missionary School between 1923 and 1938 and later continued his studies at Ongwediva Training College in 1939.

Mzee Kaukungwa died at Ongwediva MediClinic at the age of 94.
