= Niilo Taapopi =

Chief Executive Officer of the City of Windhoek
- In office 2004–2014
- Preceded by: Martin Shipanga

Personal details
- Born: Niilo Kambwa Taapopi; January 8, 1953 (age 73)
- Party: SWAPO

Niilo Kambwa Taapopi (born 8 January 1953) is a Namibian politician who served as Chief Executive Officer of the City of Windhoek from 2004 to 2014, after the resignation of businessman and former CEO Martin Shipanga. He also served as Permanent Secretary in the Ministry of Home Affairs, and as chairperson of the Polytechnic of Namibia management council.

Taapopi, a member of SWAPO, fought for the independence of Namibia and was known by his guerrilla pseudonym Kambwa Kashilongo during the liberation struggle. He was Commissar for the 1st Mechanised Brigade of the People's Liberation Army of Namibia (PLAN) and a member of the SWAPO Military Council. Taapopi was sent on a diplomatic mission as a senior diplomat to Sweden.

== Recognition ==
Etalaleko Senior Secondary School at Okahao was renamed Niilo Taapopi Senior Secondary School in 2018. Taapopi is also the patron of Ontoko Combined School.
