= Omungwelume =

Settlement in northern Namibia

Coordinates: 17°30′24″S 15°38′03″E

Omungwelume is a settlement in the Ohangwena Region of Northern Namibia. It belongs to the Ongenga electoral constituency. Omungwelume covers an area of 4.35 square kilometres (1.68 sq mi) and has 960 inhabitants.

Omungwelume is connected to Oshakati via a 36 kilometres (22 mi) D3609 tarred road that was built in 1993. The settlement has a Police station.
