= Ongenga Constituency =

Electoral constituency in the Ohangwena region of northern Namibia

Coordinates: 17°26′S 15°41′E

Ongenga constituency (red) in the Ohangwena Region of Namibia

Ongenga is a constituency in the Ohangwena Region of Namibia, on the border to Angola. It had 12,682 registered voters in 2020.

Ongenga Constituency covers an area of 320 km^{2} (120 sq mi). It had a population of 22,075 in 2011, up from 21,706 in 2001. The constituency office is the settlement of Ongenga. The constituency is sharing boundaries with Cunene Province in southern Angola on the North, Engela Constituency on the South and East, and Omusati Region in the West.

== Politics ==
As is common in all constituencies of former Owamboland, Namibia's ruling SWAPO Party has dominated elections since independence. In the 2004 regional election SWAPO candidate Leonard Shimutwikeni received 7,381 of the 7,448 votes cast.

The SWAPO candidate also won the 2015 regional election by a landslide. Sakaria Haimudi gathered 6,135 votes, while the only opposition candidate, Ferdinand Nghiitete of the Rally for Democracy and Progress (RDP), received 177 votes. SWAPO also won the 2020 regional election. Its candidate Matheus Shikongo received 4,636 votes, far ahead of Shipanduleni Mwahafa of the Independent Patriots for Change (IPC), an opposition party formed in August 2020, who obtained 901 votes.
