= Beatrice Sandelowsky =

Namibian archaeologist

- Born: 1943 (age 82–83); Namibia
- Education: University of Cape Town; University of Rochester; University of California, Berkeley

Beatrice Sandelowsky (born 1943) is a Namibian archaeologist. She was a co-founder of The University Centre for Studies in Namibia (TUCSIN).

== Biography ==
Sandelowsky grew up at her parents' farm at Brakwater near Windhoek. She attended high school in Swakopmund, and upon completion, furthered her studies at the University of Cape Town in South Africa where she obtained her teaching qualification. She then earned her BA at the University of Rochester in New York and later obtained a PhD in archaeology from the University of California, Berkeley in 1972.

Sandelowsky was one of those who took part in the establishment of the Rössing Foundation Education Center and the Museum Association of Namibia (MAN). In 1978 she was a co-founder of The University Centre for Studies in Namibia (TUCSIN) and later served as one of its directors. She also contributed to the Rehoboth Museum and the Rehoboth Public Library. From 1988 to 2000 she served as a member of the Electoral Commission of Namibia (ECN) and was a member of the National Heritage Council of Namibia until 2006.

== Publications ==
- 2004: Archaeologically Yours, Beatrice Sandelowsky: A Personal Journey Into the Prehistory of Southern Africa, in Particular Namibia. Windhoek: Namibia Scientific Society
- 2013: Prehistory in the Central Namib Desert. Windhoek: Namibia.
