= John Alphons Pandeni Combined School =

School in Omusati Region of northern Namibia

Information
- Former name: Okavu Combined School (1973-2009)
- Established: 1973; 52 years ago
- Teaching staff: 22
- Enrollment: 543

John Alphons Pandeni Combined School (formerly Okavu Combined School) is a school situated in the village of Omundjala in the Omusati Region of northern Namibia. The school was established in 1973 and is wholly owned by the Government of Namibia. Currently there are 543 learners and 22 teachers.

On 2 May 2009 the school was officially renamed after John Alphons Pandeni who was born at Omundjala and served as a Cabinet Minister of Namibia. Three blocks of the school have been named after alumni that are prominent community members:

- Khomas Governor Sophia Shaningwa
- John T. Andjamba (businessman)
- David N. Iileka (businessman)
