= The University Centre for Studies in Namibia =

The University Centre for Studies In Namibia (TUCSIN) is a tertiary educational institution in Namibia. It is based in the Khomasdal suburb of the capital Windhoek and has campuses in Rehoboth, Rundu and Oshakati.

TUCSIN was co-founded by Beatrice Sandelowsky on 15 June 1978. Since its inception it has trained 35,000 students and awarded over 1,000 bursaries to Namibian students. Andreas Wienecke is its current director.

== See also ==
- Education in Namibia
- List of schools in Namibia
