= Delta Secondary School Windhoek =

Location
- Esther Brand Street; Olympia; Windhoek; Khomas Region; Namibia
- 22.6014°S 17.097504°E

Information
- Type: Government
- Motto: Wissen, Wirken, Wollen (To know(knowledge), To act(action), To want(determination))
- Established: January 1975; 51 years ago
- School district: Khomas Region
- Principal: Mrs Peterson
- Grades: 8 to 12
- Colors: Gray, Black, Maroon
- Feeder schools: Delta School Windhoek (DSW)
- Website: www.dssw-namibia.org

Delta Secondary School Windhoek (DSSW) (German: Delta Oberschule Windhoek, DOSW) previously known as Deutsche Oberschule Windhoek, is a government secondary school in Namibia. Situated in the capital Windhoek, it was separated from its younger counterpart Delta School Windhoek (DSW), formerly known as German School Windhoek, in January 1975

== Activities ==
DSSW annually has a Dragon Boat Race at Avis Dam. The event does not only raise money for the students but it also promotes class and school involvement. It also has an annual open air school outing for Grade 8 to Blumfelde and Grade 11 to Rock Lodge.

== History ==
The secondary school started with 153 scholars who were taught by 10 teachers. During the first few years it occupied the building in Peter Müller Street (today Fidel Castro Street) that today houses the College of the Arts. In July 1978 the school moved into the building of the former Kaiserliche Realschule, later known as Deutsche Höhere Privatschule (DHPS, German Higher Private School), in Leutwein Street (today Robert Mugabe Avenue).

In 1979, the school was converted into a high school with 33 candidates completing the Matric Examinations (Cape Senior Certificate) in November of that year. At this time the school was under the jurisdiction of the Directorate of Education for the Administration for Whites. This directorate ensured that each scholar had the opportunity to have scholastic education in his/her home language in his/her own culture and social sphere. This insured that all instructions for all subjects until grade 9, used German as colloquial language and as the basis of cultural events.

In 1990, the Republic of Namibia became independent. The final (Cape Senior) matrix examinations were written in 1993, which were then replaced by the Namibian and British Cambridge system NSSC (the Namibian Senior Secondary Certificate). English became the language of instruction and all Namibian scholars were allowed to enrol. DSSW was the reception school for expatriate children that grew up in the GDR during the Namibian War of Independence. Those children, known as the GDR Children of Namibia and at the school as GDR-candidates, smoothed the integration process by initiating the social contact with other Namibians.

DSSW has been known for its high academic performances, especially in subjects like mathematics where students were honored with numerous awards. DSSW was the 8th best performing High School in Namibia in 2012, and occupied place 10 in 2013.

Grade 7 became part of the Primary School again. School numbers gradually increase to over 760 scholars and more than 35 teachers. In 2007 DSSW also introduced the opening of Projekt Lilie under the motto “Die Zukunft beginnt im Klassenzimmer” (“The future begins in the classroom”). Projekt Lilie is an initiative supporting and promoting education in Namibia, with special reference to the maintenance and advancement of the German language and culture.
