= Concordia College (Namibia) =

School in Windhoek, Namibia

- Windhoek; Namibia

Information
- Enrollment: 1,023 (2020)
- Affiliation: Namdeb (formerly)

Concordia College is a school in Windhoek, the capital of Namibia. It is situated on Windhoek's Hochland Road between the suburbs of Rocky Crest and Hochland Park. As of 2020, it had 1,023 learners and was one of nine Namibian schools to offer German as a foreign language.

The school facility was privately owned by Consolidated Diamond Mines (CDM, now Namdeb), the Namibian subsidiary of De Beers. The school was expected to provide education for children judged highly intelligent, to provide a pool of youths to be educated as teachers. It was operated by the then-colonial administration of Namibia. It was the first multi-racial state-operated school in Namibia. Establishment of the facility by De Beers was reflected in the school's diamond-shaped logo. After independence, the school was donated to the Government of Namibia. The requirement of an IQ test as a prerequisite for admission was abandoned in 1993.
