= Okahenge =

Village in Ohangwena Region, Namibia

- Interactive map of Okahenge
- Country: Namibia
- Region: Ohangwena Region
- Constituency: Endola Constituency

Okahenge is a village in the Ohangwena Region of Namibia in the Endola Constituency.
