= Cosmos High School =

Location
- Windhoek; Namibia
- Coordinates: 22.549°S 17.083°E

Information
- Type: Government
- Motto: Age quod agis (What is worth doing is worth doing well)
- Established: 1989
- Grades: 8–12
- Colors: yellow, white and black
- Website: School website

Cosmos High School is a polytechnical school in Windhoek, the capital of Namibia. It is situated in Hans-Dietrich Genscher street in the suburb of Khomasdal.

== History ==
Cosmos opened on 17 January 1989 and was officially inaugurated on 30 May 1990 by the first Prime Minister of the Republic of Namibia, Hage Geingob. The first principal was J. van Wyk.

In January 2008 the school implemented an inclusive education, when they included the first group of hearing impaired learners in January 2008 in grade 11. The school occupied the 13th place out of 33 secondary schools in the region during the academic year of 2010.

== See also ==
Education in Namibia
