= Onelombo =

Namibian village

Coordinates: 17°33′44″S 15°35′39″E

Onelombo is a village situated in the northern part of Namibia, in Etayi Constituency of Omusati region.

Onelombo is a home to Olupandu primary school and Onelombo Roman Catholic church.
