= Namibian Institute of Mining and Technology =

Namibian vocational training institute

Coordinates: 22.3377°S 15.0250°E

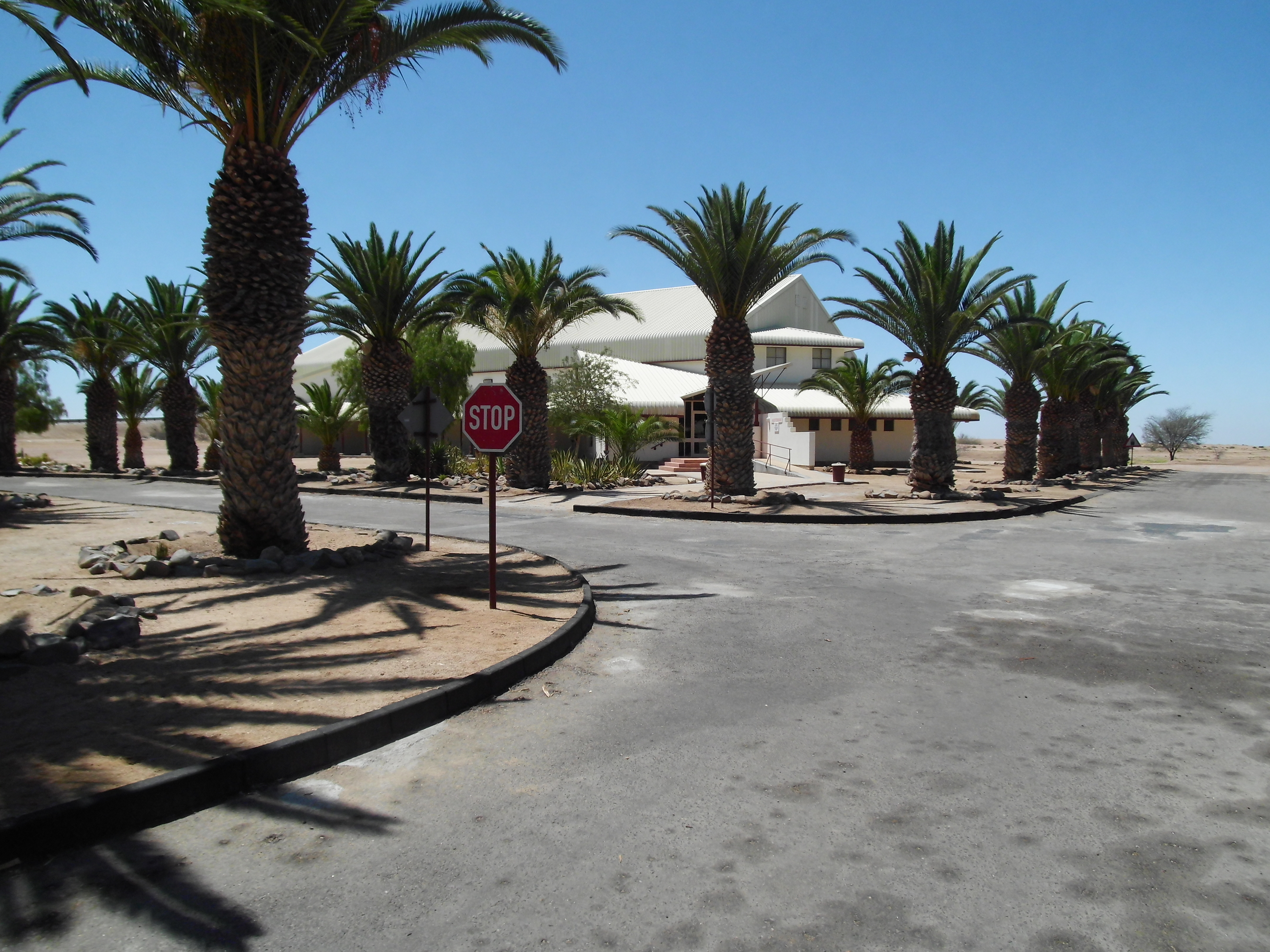
Namibian Institute of Mining and Technology in 2016

The Namibian Institute of Mining and Technology (NIMT) is a technical vocational training institute in Arandis, Namibia, established in 1991. It had 4,000 students and 270 staff in 2017, Eckhart Mueller was its executive director until he was murdered with his deputy on 15 April 2019. NIMT offers courses in mining, manufacturing and engineering. In 2007, De Beers donated N$2.1 million to open a second northern campus and in November of that year a campus was opened in Tsumeb. NIMT also operates a campus in Keetmanshoop in southern Namibia.

NIMT produces between 300 and 500 graduates a year who go on to be employed by the mining industry of Namibia.

== See also ==
- Education in Namibia
- List of universities in Namibia
