= Epembe Constituency =

Electoral constituency in the Ohangwena region of northern Namibia

Coordinates: 17°46′S 16°12′E

Epembe constituency (red) in the Ohangwena Region of Namibia

Epembe is a constituency in the Ohangwena Region of northern Namibia. It had 6,489 registered voters in 2020.

The constituency covers an area of 1,810 km^{2} (700 sq mi). The constituency office is located in Epembe. The constituency had a population of 16,229 in 2011, up from 14,860 in 2001. Settlements in this constituency include Eenheni, Egongo, Ekuma, Etambo la Mushi Onamogani, Etsapa, Iikelo, Ohenghono-Ohamikoka, Ohamukulungudju, Onhinda, Okuuya, Othilku, Oondunda, Onamvula A, Onamungonzi, Omuhongo, Omalambo, Onanyati, Ombaba, Oshamono, Okahwandada, Oshiweda, Onaame, Omushuwa, Omufiya wa Amutenya wa Shiweda, Ohamwiimbi, Okakwena, Onhinda, Ohamatundu Omevataahekele, Okamwandi, Onangolo and Onamundidi.

Oshidute Combined School is located in this constituency.

Many settlements in the constituency are only accessible via 4x4, have only weak cell phone network coverage, and access to clean water is not universally available. Health and education facilities are far away for many residents, with the nearest clinics at Epembe and Onangolo.

== Politics ==
As is common in all constituencies of former Owamboland, Namibia's ruling SWAPO Party has dominated elections since independence. In the 2004 regional election SWAPO candidate Johannes Nakwafila received 4,731 of the 4,750 votes cast.

SWAPO won the 2015 regional election uncontested, as no opposition party fielded a candidate. The 2020 regional election was also won by the SWAPO candidate. Matheus Nanghama received 3,136 votes, far ahead of Immanuel Kashona of the Independent Patriots for Change (IPC), an opposition party formed in August 2020, who obtained 279 votes.
