= Pionier Boys' School =

- Windhoek; Namibia

Information
- Type: Government School
- Motto: ALTUM TETE (Aim High)
- Opened: 1955
- Principal: Orgill van Wyk
- Faculty: 36
- Enrollment: 450

Pionier Boys' School is a school for adolescents with learning difficulties in Windhoek, the capital of Namibia. It is situated in the Dorado Park suburb. The school offers grades 5–7 for learners between 14 and 16 years of age, as well as vocational training. The only other school in Windhoek that caters for students with general learning difficulties is Eros School for Girls, although there are other schools for children with specific handicaps such as hearing and visual impairments.

Pionier Boys' School was established in 1955. In 2011 there were 400 learners and 36 teachers at the school. One or two learners of the school are selected each year to serve on the Junior Council of the City of Windhoek.

== Principals of the school ==
- Dr. J.H.S. Oosthuizen 1955-1960
- Mr. J. J. Vos 1960-1973
- Mr. A. J. Venter 1975-1977
- Mr. F. J. N. Steyn 1979-1980
- Mr. J. H. Swiegers 1981-1989
- Mr. Niewoudt
- Mr. Cloete
- Mr. Linde 1996 - 2001
- Mr. B. Eiseb 2001 - 2006
- Mr. Orgill "Ock" van Wyk 2006 - currently
