= Okombahe =

Okombahe Khoekhoe: /Âǂgommes
- Settlement
- Location in Namibia
- Coordinates: 21°21′36″S 15°22′30″E
- Country: Namibia
- Region: Erongo Region
- Time zone: UTC+2 (South African Standard Time)

Okombahe is a settlement in the Erongo Region of eastern central Namibia, situated on the Omaruru River 70 kilometres (43 mi) north of Karibib. It is regarded as the capital of the ǂNûkhoen (Damara) tribe; the annual King's Festival is held at the town's Gaob Memorial Stadium. Before independence of Namibia, Okombahe was situated at the edge of the Damaraland bantustan. Martin Luther High School and Dibasen Junior Secondary School are situated in the village.

The Omaruru River's sub-surface water is used by the Damara people to grow wheat. Even in years of drought, 60-80 hectares are under irrigation.

== Notable people ==
- Michael Goreseb, Mayor of Usakos and Member of the National Assembly of Namibia
