= Onayena =

- Settlement
- Location in Namibia
- Coordinates: 17°56.59′S 16°11.30′E
- Country: Namibia
- Region: Oshikoto Region
- Constituency: Onayena Constituency

Government
  - Type: Local Town Council
  - Regional Councillor: Natangwe Iyambo Indongo
- Elevation: 3,540 ft (1,079 m)

Population (2011)
  - Total: 15 000
- Time zone: UTC+2 (South African Standard Time)
- Climate: BSh

Onayena is the district capital of Onayena Constituency in the north of Oshikoto Region in northern Namibia, situated approximately 80 kilometres (50 mi) north of Etosha National Park.

== Economy and infrastructure ==
The main economic activities in the constituency are agriculture and cattle rearing. Omahangu is the principal crop in Onayena, while cattle, goats and donkeys are the farming animals in the area. The constituency has important cultural and historical links. Onayena has a settlement prominent for investment opportunities and has a lot of large virgin land, available housing, and business investment.

Nehale Senior Secondary School is located in Onayena.

== People from Onayena Constituency ==
Onayena is the hometown of many prominent people in Namibia, such as the multi-award-winning kwaito musician and producer The Dogg, and home to the first Vice-President of Namibia, Nickey Iyambo.
