= Namibian Maritime and Fisheries Institute =

Tertiary educational institution in Walvis Bay, Namibia

The Namibian Maritime and Fisheries Institute (NAMFI) is a tertiary educational institution situated in Walvis Bay, Namibia. It was established in 1996 by the Ministry of Fisheries and Marine Resources. NAMFI provides maritime and fisheries training in accordance with the International Maritime Organization (IMO) and builds capacity in the field of maritime and fisheries sectors in and around Namibia.

NAMFI offers education in Navigation, Engineering and Safety. Students sit for an exam with the Directorate of Maritime Affairs (DMA) within the Ministry of Works and Transport. DMA is an IMO accredited authority and NAMFI is accredited by DMA. All training activities at NAMFI are in accordance with the STCW 78/95 convention as well the Namibian Merchant Shipping Act of 1951, particularly in the areas of education, training, and certification of Namibian seafarers.

NAMFI includes vocational courses in its curriculum.

== See also ==
- Education in Namibia
