= Tsandi Constituency =

Electoral constituency in the Omusati region of northern Namibia

Coordinates: 17°45′S 14°53′E

Tsandi Constituency (red) in the Omusati Region

Tsandi Constituency is an electoral constituency in the Omusati Region of Namibia. It had 15,618 registered voters in 2020. Its district capital is the settlement of Tsandi. The constituency contains the village of Omugulugwombashe, the place where the first armed battle in the Namibian struggle for independence took place.

Tsandi Constituency covers an area of 2,363 km^{2} (912 sq mi). It had a population of 28,018 in 2011, up from 11,204 in 2001.

== Politics ==
Tsandi constituency is traditionally a stronghold of the South West Africa People's Organization (SWAPO) party. The 2004 regional election was won by SWAPO politician Leevi Shiimi Katoma. He received 8,731 of the 8,834 votes cast.

In the 2015 local and regional elections SWAPO candidate Junias Amunkete won uncontested and became councillor after no opposition party nominated a candidate. Councillor Amunkete (SWAPO) was reelected in the 2020 regional election. He obtained 7,186 voted, far ahead of independent candidate Saara Amutenya with 360 votes and Natangwe Neingo of the Independent Patriots for Change (IPC), an opposition party formed in August 2020, with 313 votes.
