= St. George's Diocesan School, Windhoek =

St. George's Diocesan School

Location
- 17 - 21, Sinclair Road, Windhoek, Khomas Region, Namibia
- 22.5614°S 17.0877°E

Information
- School type: Private school
- Religious affiliation: Christianity
- Denomination: Anglican Communion
- Established: 1919 (107 years ago)
- Founder: Anglican Diocese of Namibia
- Locale: Urban
- Grades: Pre-K; Kindergarten; Primary school Secondary school
- Gender: Co-educational
- Language: English
- Affiliations: Round Square; Cambridge
- Website: https://stgeorgesnamibia.com

St. George's Diocesan School is a co-educational parochial school in Windhoek, Namibia. Founded in 1919, it is one of the oldest and most prestigious schools in the country.

A Round Square and Cambridge affiliate, St. George's is part of the Anglican Diocese of Namibia; the reigning bishop serves as visitor and chair of the school's council of trustees. Its curriculum includes the heavy involvement of music, drama, fine art and other artistic disciplines.
