= Jan Möhr Secondary School =

Location
- Mercury Street Road; Windhoek West; Khomas Region; Windhoek, P.O. BOX 162; Namibia
- Coordinates: 22.5693°S 17.0647°E

Information
- Other name: Jan Möhr High School
- Former name: Windhoek West High School
- School type: Secondary School
- Religious affiliation: Christian (other religions are still welcome)
- Patron saint: George Pieters
- Established: 2 March 1962
- Founder: J.D Möhr
- Status: Government/Public
- School number: 061 237 555
- Principal: Lucas Hashiti
- Grades: 8-12
- Years taught: 60 years
- Gender: Males and Females
- Education system: Namibia Senior Secondary Certificate (Ordinary Level and Advanced Subsidiary Level)
- Language: English
- Colors: Blue, Orange, Grey and White
- Slogan: Altyd My Beste (Always My Best)
- Athletics: Yes
- Sports: Rugby, Soccer Netball, Chess
- Annual tuition: N$2 200
- Last updated: November 11, 2022

Jan Möhr Secondary School is a school situated in Windhoek, Namibia. The school was founded on March 2, 1962 and is one of the oldest schools in Namibia. The school is known for its excellent academic record. The school has continued to achieve an annual 90% and 60% pass rate for grade 10 and 12 results respectively. The school was originally known as the Windhoek West High School (WHHS) but was later changed to Jan Möhr Secondary School, being named after the then Director of Education Mr JD Möhr. The school's motto is 'Altyd My Beste', which means 'Always My Best' when translated into English.
