= Erwee =

Erwee is a South African surname. Notable people with the surname include:

- Bianca Erwee (born 1990), South African heptathlete
- Sarel Erwee (born 1989), South African cricketer
