= Namib High School =

School in Namibia

Coordinates: 22°40′33.32″S 14°31′46.8″E

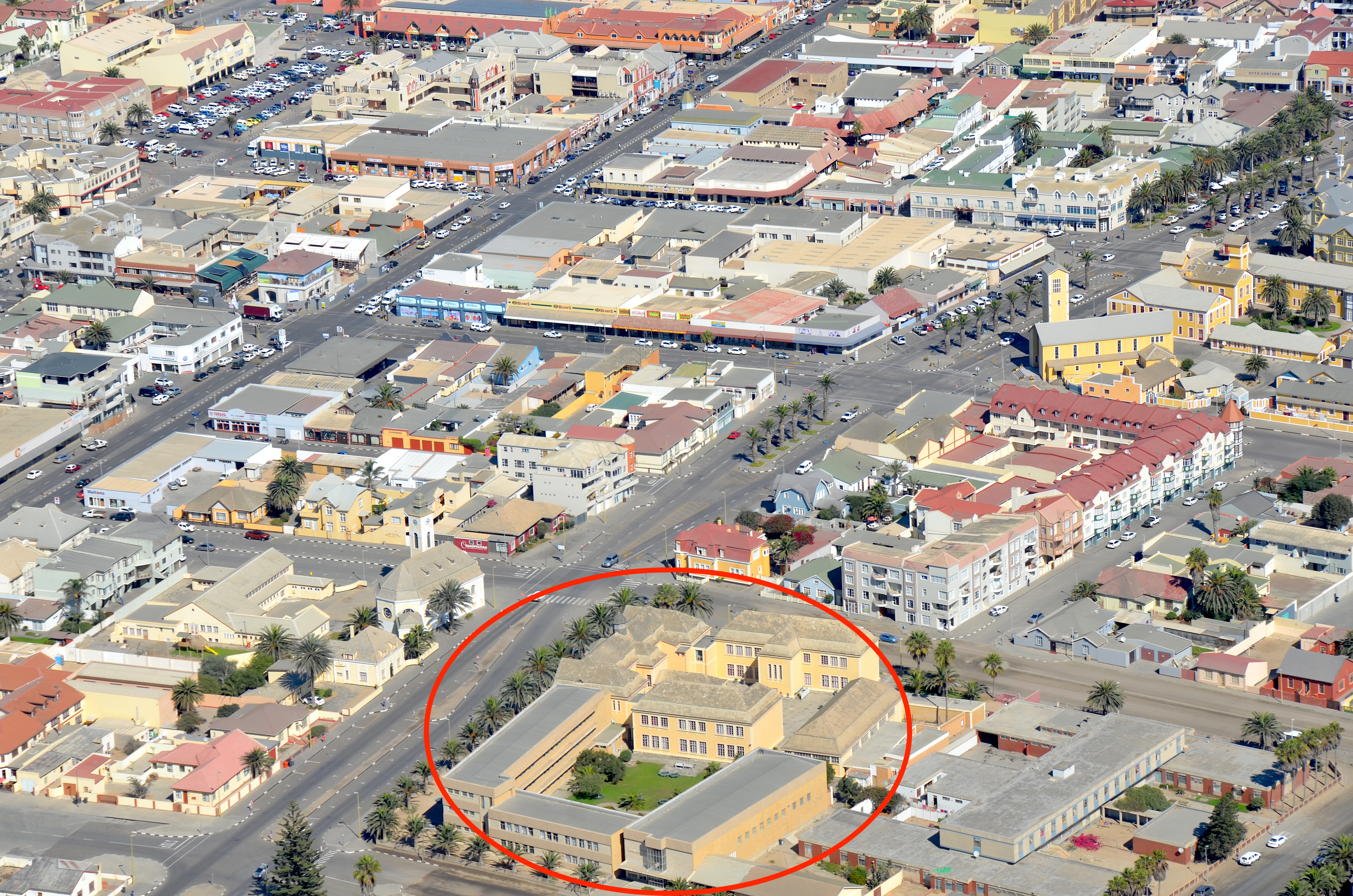
Aerial view of Namib High School (2017)

Namib High School is a secondary government school in Swakopmund, Namibia. It has 640 learners and 28 teachers. Founded as Städtische Realschule mit Grundschule (Municipal High School with Primary School) during the colonial time of German South-West Africa in 1913 it is one of the oldest schools in Namibia.

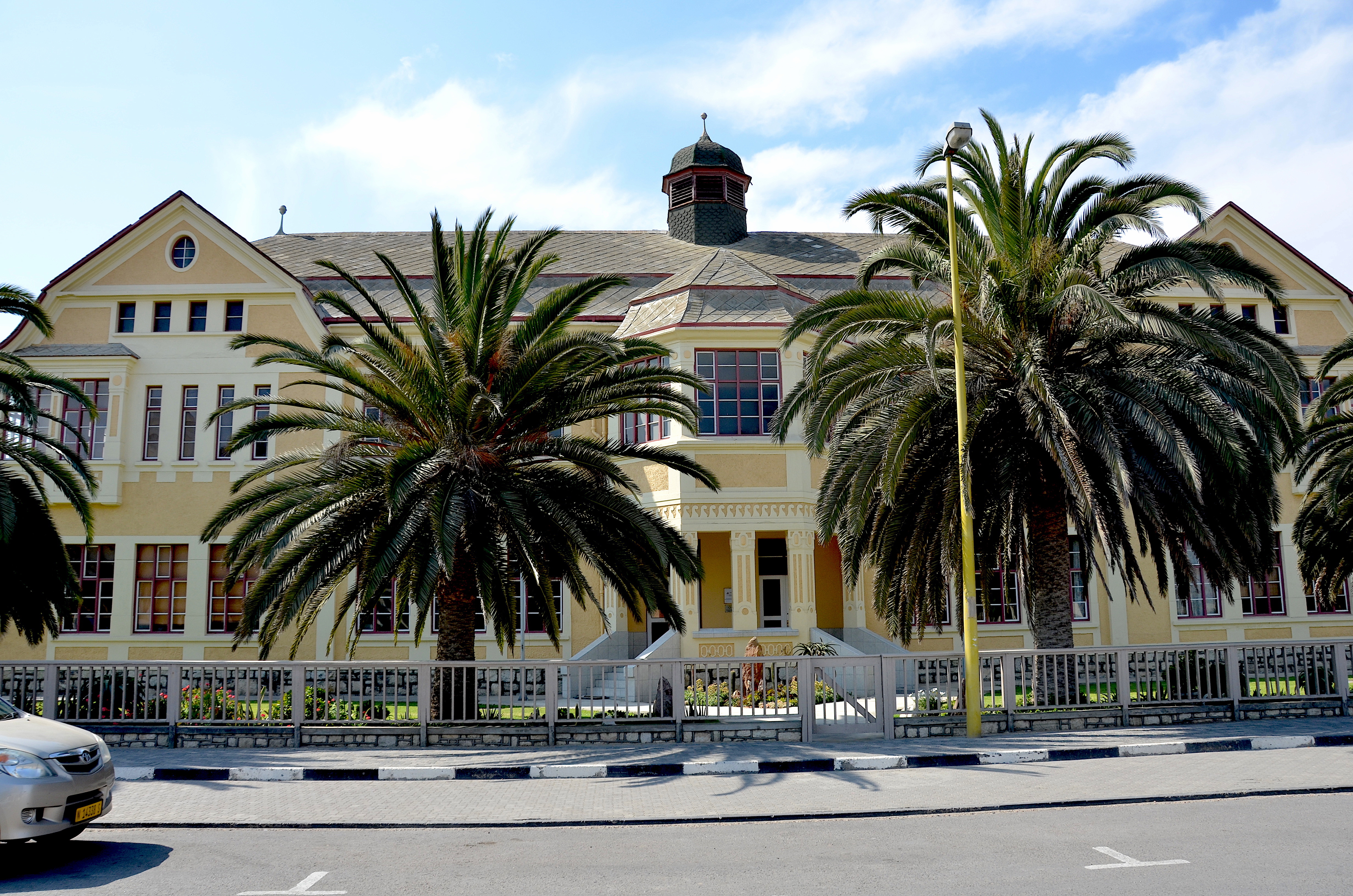
Namib High School (2014)

== History ==
Swakopmund was founded in 1892 and received municipal status in 1909. The building behind the lighthouse was used as school for 30 children of German settlers until 1913. When it became too small for the rapidly growing settlement, the foundation of a new school building was laid on 22 February 1913. The building, which is still in use by the school and largely unaltered, was finished the same year, and on 18 October 1913 the Städtische Realschule mit Grundschule was inaugurated.

There was no school in 1914 and 1915 due to the evacuation of Swakopmund in World War I. When the German troops capitulated in 1915, the South African Administration of South-West Africa took over the school. It was renamed Swakopmund Primary School in 1919. The secondary section of the school moved into new buildings that today house the Namib Primary School.

In 1930 the school became a high school again and was named Reformrealgymnasium. The medium of instruction had been German since the school was founded. In 1947 it was replaced by English, but the school still attracted a considerable number of German and Afrikaans native children from outside town. English natives commuted by bus from the formerly British Walvis Bay 30 kilometres (19 mi) south of Swakopmund. The school developed into one of the leading schools of South-West Africa.

In 1976 due to the opening of the Rössing Uranium Mine a lot of development took place in Swakopmund and new schools were developed along cultural lines. The school, since its foundation exclusively for white children, became a German secondary school called the Deutsche Schule Swakopmund, and in 1980 the Deutsche Oberschule Swakopmund.

When Namibia became independent in 1990 doors were opened for all Namibian citizens. The school changed its medium of instruction to English language with German as a compulsory subject. The school then changed its name to Namib High School on 7 July 1997, in reference to the Namib Desert within which Swakopmund is situated.

== Performance ==
Namib High School is among the best-performing schools countrywide. It occupied rank 14 of the national A-level school results in both 2012 and 2013.

== See also ==
- List of schools in Namibia
- Education in Namibia
