= Onankali =

Village in Namibia

Coordinates: 18°10′S 16°21′E

- Location in Namibia
- Country: Namibia
- Traditional region / Area: Owamboland

Population
  - Total: ~4,000 *(total population context)*

Onankali is a village in the northern part of Namibia namely Owamboland, it is situated about 50 km South East of Ondangwa or 20 km North-West of Omuthiya. The "developed village" is populated with about 4000 siblings of which 60% migrated to Urban areas to seek for employment and other better living standards. There is a clinic, elcin church, mini markets, one combined school and several primary schools. This village is developing at a fast face, rural water supply, agricultural forestry and education offices had already in operation.
