= Outapi Constituency =

Electoral constituency in the Omusati region of northern Namibia

Coordinates: 18°2′S 15°19′E

Outapi Constituency (red) in the Omusati Region

Outapi Constituency (until 1998 Uutapi Constituency) is an electoral constituency in the Omusati Region of Namibia on the border of Angola. It had 23,516 registered voters in 2020. Its district capital is the town of Outapi. Outapi Constituency covers an area of 986 km^{2} (381 sq mi). It had a population of 36,934 in 2011, up from 13,121 in 2001.

== Politics ==
Outapi constituency is traditionally a stronghold of the South West Africa People's Organization (SWAPO) party. The 2004 regional election was won by SWAPO politician Tataati Simon Shilekah. He received 9,802 of the 9,861 votes cast.

In the 2015 local and regional elections SWAPO candidate Fillemon Shikwambi won uncontested and became councillor after no opposition party nominated a candidate. The SWAPO candidate won the 2020 regional election by a large margin. Immanuel Shikongo obtained 8,682 votes, followed by Frans Taapopi of the Independent Patriots for Change (IPC), an opposition party formed in August 2020, with 1,094 votes.
