= Outjo Secondary School =

- Outjo; Namibia

Information
- Opened: 1954
- Website: About Outjo Secondary School

Outjo Secondary School is a secondary school in Outjo, Namibia. It was founded in 1954 as a school for white schoolchildren only. When Namibia became independent in 1990, apartheid policies were abandoned, and the school is no longer segregated.

After many struggles, the school finally managed to stand firm and continue providing quality education to its learners. By now a number of black children and black teachers became part of the school. Towards the late 1990s, the numbers whites at the school have decreased to teachers only. In 1995, Mr. B. Awoseb became the first black principal of Outjo Secondary School until 2004 when Ms. Annaline Venter became the acting principal. In 2006, Mr. Katjiruua became the second black principal. In 2008, he was succeeded by the late Mr. Sedney Haradoeb who acted for it when Mr. Katjiruua left in 2007.

The current school principal is Mr. Usko Shivute who joined the school in January 2023.
