= Oshidute Combined School =

School in Ohangwena Region, Namibia

Oshidute Combined School is a school in Oshidute village, Ohakafiya circuit, in the Ohangwena Region of Namibia. In 2007 it had 321 enrolled students. It was founded on 12 February 1976 and accommodates students from the 1st to the 10th grade.

The school has a library and is supported by the Kirkwood School District in the US, which organised the distribution of pens and notebooks.
