= Onesi Constituency =

Electoral constituency in Omusati region, Namibia

Coordinates: 17°35′S 14°41′E

Onesi Constituency (red) in the Omusati Region

Onesi Constituency is an electoral constituency in the Omusati Region of Namibia, on the border with Angola. It had 9,941 registered voters in 2020. It is named after the district capital, Onesi.

Onesi Constituency covers an area of 602 km^{2} (232 sq mi). It had a population of 13,149 in 2011, up from 12,995 in 2001.

== Politics ==
Onesi constituency is traditionally a stronghold of the South West Africa People's Organization (SWAPO) party. The 2004 regional election was won by SWAPO politician Fillemon Jatileni. He received 4,501 of the 4,573 votes cast.

In the 2015 local and regional elections SWAPO candidate Titus Kanyele won uncontested and became councillor after no opposition party nominated a candidate. The SWAPO candidate won the 2020 regional election by a large margin. Festus Petrus obtained 4,223 votes, followed by Johannes Amunyela of the Independent Patriots for Change (IPC), an opposition party formed in August 2020, with 322 votes.
