= Namibia Qualifications Authority =

Statutory body for educational standards

- Type: Statutory body
- Headquarters: Windhoek, Namibia
- Location: Windhoek
- Director: Mr. Franz Gertze
- Website: Official website

The Namibia Qualifications Authority (NQA) is a statutory body in Namibia, regulated in terms of the National Qualifications Framework Act No 29 of 1996. It is made up of 29 members appointed by the Minister of Education in consultation with the Minister of Labour. The NQA is mandated by legislation to oversee the development and implementation of the National Qualifications Framework (NQF).

== Functions ==
The NQA has the following legislative obligations:

- To set up and administer a national qualifications framework
- Set the occupational standards for any occupation, job, post or positions in any career structure
- Set the curriculum standards for achieving the occupational standards
- Promote the development of, or analyse, benchmarks of acceptable performance norms for any occupation, job or position
- Accredit persons, institutions and organisations providing education and courses of instruction or training
- Evaluate and recognise competencies learnt outside formal education
- Be a forum on matters pertaining to qualifications
- Establish facilities for the collection and dissemination of information in connection with matters pertaining to qualifications
- Enquire into whether any particular qualification meets the national standards
- Advise any person, body, institution, organisation or interest group on matters pertaining to qualifications and national standards for qualifications.
