= Tsandi =

Village in northern Namibia

- Village
- Location in Namibia
- Coordinates: 17°45′S 14°53′E
- Country: Namibia
- Region: Omusati Region
- Constituency: Tsandi
- Declared settlement area: 1997
- Proclaimed village: 2015

Government
  - Type: Village council

Population (2023)
  - Total: 2,595
- Time zone: UTC+2 (SAST)

Tsandi (Oshiwambo: that which is at the center) is a village in the Omusati Region of northern Namibia and the district capital of the Tsandi electoral constituency. It is a former mission station of the Finnish Missionary Society. Tsandi had a population of 2,595 people in 2023.

== Geography ==
Tsandi is situated on the main road MR123 (Outapi - Tsandi - Okahao). It is the residential place of the Uukwaluudhi royal homestead. It is also the trade center for the whole constituency and one of the oldest villages in the Uukwaluudhi kingdom. Tsandi Lodge is 2.5 kilometres (1.6 mi) away from the town in the direction of Outapi.

Historical population
Year	Pop.	±% p.a.
2011	891	—
2023	2,595	+9.32%

== Politics ==
Tsandi was declared a settlement area in 1997. In 2015 its status was upgraded to a village. Since then, it is governed by a village council that has five seats.

Omusati Region, to which Tsandi belongs, is a stronghold of Namibia's ruling SWAPO party. For the 2015 local authority election no opposition party nominated a candidate, and SWAPO won all five seats uncontested. SWAPO also won the 2020 local authority election. It obtained 261 votes and gained four seats. The Independent Patriots for Change (IPC), an opposition party formed in August 2020, obtained 72 votes and gained the remaining seat.

== History ==
The Finnish missionaries, who arrived in Ovamboland in 1870, visited the west of the area towards the end of the following year, visiting e.g. Uukwaluudhi, but the visit to that tribe did not have any tangible results at the time.

In 1909, the leadership of the Finnish Missionary Society in Finland considered that missionary work should be begun also in the west of Ovamboland, and in particular among the Uukwaluudhi tribe. The local head of the mission, Martti Rautanen, together with some of his colleagues, went in July and August 1909 to Uukwaluudhi to select a site for a new mission station. They chose a place called Tsandi, and a month later the missionary August Hänninen began the construction work at the site.

The Finns came to the site at the invitation of King Iita, but he died already at the end of the same year. However, his successor Mwala Nashilongo was also friendly with the Finns, and likewise his people, too. They were not suspicious of the Finns, and the locals turned to them when they were ill. However, they did not show much interest to the preaching activities, and the local congregation consisted mainly of people who have moved there from Ondonga. The first local to be baptized in 1912 was an Uukwaluudhi man, and his three children were also baptized at the same time. The total number of people baptized on that day was 12.

Hänninen soon noticed that conducting divine services and running a school outside, under a local tree, was difficult, so he encouraged his congregation members to build a proper church, built of bricks. Hänninen himself promised to acquire nails and other items and windows for the building, and teacher Aini Packalén promised to pay for the door, and the parish members made the bricks. Each man produced 500 bricks. The construction work was carried out during the cold season of 1912, and at the beginning of August, the building was completed. Its inauguration was attended to by people from all neighbouring tribes.

Hänninen also went on preaching trips to the neighbouring tribe of Uukolonkadhi, and he was also asked to visit the tribe of Ombalantu. And auxiliary mission was founded in Uukolonkadhi, in the care of an ardent teacher and evangelist from Ongandjera, Abraham Iintamba.

In 1922, Aatu Järvinen, a new missionary, came to Tsandi. Before the First World War he had attended a course of tropical diseases in Tübingen, Germany. He founded the clinic of Tsandi.

During the 1930s, the missionary Sulo Aarni worked in Tsandi. His wife was the above-mentioned Aini Packalén. He made trips to the Kaokoveld, nearly 100 miles to the west, to visit the Hereros who lived there.
