= Engela Constituency =

Electoral constituency in the Ohangwena region of northern Namibia

Coordinates: 17°26′S 15°52′E

Engela constituency (red) in the Ohangwena Region of Namibia

Engela is an electoral constituency in the Ohangwena Region of northern Namibia. It had 13,743 registered voters in 2020. The constituency office is situated in Oshimwaku. It is named after the settlement of Engela, today part of the town Helao Nafidi. Engela is home to one of the biggest hospitals in Namibia, Engela State Hospital.

== Geography ==
Engela Constituency covers an area of 296 km^{2} (114 sq mi). It had a population of 24,271 in 2011, up from 21,832 in 2001.

The constituency is usually affected by flood waters from Cunene Province in southern Angola when it receives good rainfall, leaving many areas submerged. This usually affects residents living in flood-prone areas in the constituency. Due to the flooding, schools are being closed, leaving learners trapped in their homes. Additionally, during flooding season, roads, buildings, and houses are damaged and livestock dies, affecting the community's livelihood in the constituency.

== Politics ==
As is common in all constituencies of former Ovamboland, Namibia's ruling SWAPO Party has dominated elections since independence. In the 2004 regional election SWAPO candidate Nghidinihamba Urias Ndilula received 6,774 of the 6,802 votes cast.

In the 2015 regional election SWAPO also won by a landslide. Its candidate Jason Ndakunda gathered 5,372 votes, while the only opposition candidate, Laban Kanyiki of the Rally for Democracy and Progress (RDP), received 574 votes. The 2020 regional election was also won by the SWAPO candidate. Elkan Hainghumbi received 4,431 votes, far ahead of Ngenokesho Nandeukeni of the Independent Patriots for Change (IPC), an opposition party formed in August 2020, who obtained 867 votes.
