= Ohangwena Region =

Coordinates: 17°36′S 16°48′E

- Region
- Location of the Ohangwena Region (red) in Namibia
- Country: Namibia
- Capital: Eenhana

Government
  - Governor: Kadiva Hamutumwa

Area
  - Total: 10,706 km^{2} (4,134 sq mi)

Population (2023)
  - Total: 337,729
  - Density: 31.546/km^{2} (81.703/sq mi)
- Time zone: UTC+2 (CAT)
- HDI (2017): 0.598 medium · 11th
- Website: ohangwenarc.gov.na

Ohangwena is one of the fourteen regions of Namibia; its capital is Eenhana. Major settlements in the region are the towns of Eenhana and Helao Nafidi, as well as the self-governed village of Okongo and the proclaimed settlements Ongha, Ongenga and Omungwelume. As of 2020, Ohangwena had 150,724 registered voters.

Ohangwena is traversed by the northwesterly line of equal latitude and longitude. In the north, Ohangwena borders Angola: the Cunene Province, except for a small border with Cubango Province in the far northeast. Domestically, it borders the following regions:

- Kavango West - East
- Oshikoto - South
- Oshana - South West
- Omusati - West

== Economy and infrastructure ==
The northern and western parts of the region are the most densely populated of this essentially subsistence agricultural region, in which small-scale mahangu cultivation and the keeping of cattle form the predominant activities. Although the region depends on rain-fed agriculture, other crops can be established under intensive cultivation.

The main settlements in the region straddle the good paved road from the Angolan border to Ondangwa, where it joins the Oshakati-Tsumeb trunk road. The eastern part of the region possesses good grazing land, but the shortage of water and poor communications render it uninhabitable at present.

Ohangwena has 234 schools with a total of 90,703 pupils.

== Libraries ==
Ohangwena region has a regional library (Ohangwena Regional Library) which is an answer for learners and students to their research and school projects. It is situated in Helao Nafidi Town. After reconstruction at a cost of approximately N$4 million, the library opened its doors to the general public in January 2025.

There are also other community libraries in the Ohangwena Region.

- Eenhana Community Library
- Okongo Community Library
- Omungwelume Community Library

== Politics ==
=== Constituencies ===
Ohangwena constituencies (2014)

The region comprises twelve constituencies:

- Eenhana
- Endola
- Engela
- Epembe
- Ohangwena
- Okongo
- Omulonga (created in 2003)
- Omundaungilo
- Ondobe
- Ongenga
- Oshikango
- Oshikunde (created in 2013)

=== Election results ===
Ohangwena is one of the regions where many Namibian politicians are from, including former president Hifikepunye Pohamba, Hidipo Hamutenya (founding president of the Rally for Democracy and Progress, RDP), Minister of Environment and Tourism Pohamba Shifeta, former deputy minister and ambassador Hadino Hishongwa, founding member of SWAPO Mzee Kaukungwa, Charles Namoloh (former diplomat, politician, and military figure who served in the cabinet of Namibia as Minister of Safety and Security), and several other ministers and high-profile politicians.

A significant amount of fighting occurred in the region during the Namibian War of Independence. Just as Namibia was set for independence, fighting broke out on April 1, 1989, in the region between People's Liberation Army of Namibia combatants and soldiers in the occupying South African Defence Force. The resulting "9-day war" left many dead.

Ohangwena Region is a SWAPO stronghold. In the 2004 regional election for the National Assembly of Namibia, SWAPO won in all constituencies by a landslide. In Omundaungilo, no opposition party even nominated a candidate. In the 2015 regional elections, SWAPO obtained 95% of the total votes (2010: 92%) and won all twelve constituencies with 90% or more. The Rally for Democracy and Progress (RDP) managed to name opposition candidates in all constituencies but one, and the Democratic Turnhalle Alliance (DTA) in two. In the 2020 regional election, SWAPO's support dropped slightly to 82% of the total votes. It still won all constituencies by a large margin.

=== Governors ===
- Billy Mwaningange
- Usko Nghaamwa (2005–2020)
- Walde Ndevashiya (2020–November 2023)
- Sebastian Ndeitunga (November 2023-June 2025)
- Kadiva Hamutumwa (July 2025–)

== Demographics ==
According to the Namibia 2023 Population and Housing Census, Ohangwena had a population of 337,729 (178,028 females and 159,701 males or 90 males for every 100 females), growing at an annual rate of 2.7%. The fertility rate was 5.0 children per woman. 14.5% lived in urban areas while 85.5% lived in rural areas, and with an area of 10,703 km^{2}, the population density was 31.7 persons per km^{2}. By age, 16.2% of the population was under 5 years old, 29.1% between 5–14 years, 46.7% between 15 and 59 years, and 8% 60 years and older. The population was divided into 67,820 households, with an average size of 4.8 persons. 58% of households had a female head of household, while 42% had a male. For those 15 years and older, 73.2% had never married, 15.5% married with a certificate, 4.6% married traditionally, 1.2% married by a consensual union, 1.0% were divorced or separated, and 3.9% were widowed.

The most commonly spoken languages at home were Oshiwambo, spoken in 97% of households. For those 15 years and older, the literacy rate was 84.6%. In terms of education, of those 15 years and older, 57.7% had left school, 24.2% were currently at school, and 14.8% had never attended.

In 2001, the employment rate for the labor force (43% of those 15+) was 64% employed and 36% unemployed. For those 15+ years old and not in the labor force (53%), 35% were students, 41% homemakers, and 24% retired, too old, etc. According to the 2012 Namibia Labour Force Survey, unemployment in the Ohangwena Region stood at 34.6%. The two studies are methodologically not comparable.

Among households, 84.3% had access to safe water but only 38.3% to improved sanitation (toilet facilities). 20.7% of the households have electricity for lighting, and 83.2% have wood or charcoal for cooking. In terms of households' main sources of income, 22.1% derived it from farming, 24.9% from wages and salaries, 10.5% from business or non-farming, and 23.8% from old-age pension.

== Villages ==
- Eehongo
- Okahenge
- Oupili is situated in the Oshikunde constituency and approximately 30 kilometres (19 mi) from Okongo
- Omukukutu is a village in Epembe Constituency, located some 12 km from the main tar road from Eenhana to Okongo along a two-track gravel road with relatively thick sand. The distance from Eenhana to the turnoff from the main tar road is just under 40 km.
- Omundaungilo is a settlement area, not officially proclaimed, but regarded as the de facto capital of Omundaungilo Constituency. Omundaungilo is located about 15 km north of the main tar road from Eenhana to Okongo; the turnoff is about 40 km east of Eenhana. The San community lived on the outskirts of the settlement in an area called Omiishi in Oshikwanyama and N!u10 in the local! Xun dialect.
- Onane, a village in Okongo Constituency, is located about 12 km from the main tar road from Okongo to the Okongo Community Forest and Conservancy and on to Rundu. Onane is reached via a two-track gravel/sand road (primarily gravel, with relatively thick sand in parts). The distance along the tar road from Okongo to the turnoff to Onane village is approximately 30 km.
- Ouholamo is a neighbourhood of the town of Eenhana. Located on the eastern outskirts of the town, Ouholamo is reached via a small sandy track through the bush.
- Ouhongo in Engela constituency is located on the western outskirts of Helao Nafidi town council in Engela. It shares its borders with Engela, Omatunda, Onghala, and Onambango.
- Onamwilwa in Ohangwena constituency is located on the eastern outskirts of Helao Nafidi Town Council. It shares its border with Omungholyo waShikolalye, Onekwaya, Ohangwena ya Amoni, and Eemboo villages.
