= Omusati Region =

Namibian first-level administrative division

Coordinates: 18°24′S 14°48′E

- Region
- Location of the Omusati Region in Namibia
- Country: Namibia
- Capital: Outapi

Government
  - Governor: Immanuel Shikongo

Area
  - Total: 26,551 km^{2} (10,251 sq mi)

Population (2023 census)
  - Total: 316,671
  - Density: 11.927/km^{2} (30.891/sq mi)
- Time zone: UTC+2 (CAT)
- HDI (2017): 0.617 medium · 9th
- Website: omusatirc.gov.na

Omusati (the Oshindonga word for Mopane, the dominant tree in the area) is one of the fourteen regions of Namibia; its capital is Outapi. The towns of Okahao, Oshikuku, and Ruacana, as well as the self-governed village of Tsandi, are situated in this region. As of 2020, Omusati had 148,834 registered voters.

The region is home to the Ruacana Falls, among the largest waterfalls in Africa, and the Omugulugwombashe heritage site, where the Namibian struggle for independence started in 1966.

== Geography ==
In the north, Omusati borders the Cunene Province of Angola. Domestically, it borders the following regions:

- Ohangwena - northeast
- Oshana - east
- Kunene - south and west

The region got its name from the Mopane tree (omusati: Ndonga: Mopane), which is the dominant species in the region. The Makalani palms decrease rapidly westwards from the border with the Oshana region. The change in vegetation type reflects ecological conditions, forming a natural boundary between the two regions.

The region is home to the Ruacana Falls. The waterfall is 120 meters (390 ft) high and 700 meters (2,300 ft) wide in full flood and is among the largest waterfalls in Africa, both by volume and width.

=== Villages ===
- Okaleke
- Ohembe
- Olupandu
- Onelombo
- Omutaku Ngwakayupa
- Onekukumo
- Onawa
- Ouholondema
- Onghili
- Onembamba

== Economy and infrastructure ==
The northern part of Omusati is far more densely populated than the south, where the grazing is of poor quality and the water is generally saline. This is primarily an agricultural region where mahangu, also known as pearl millet, is successfully grown. A canal carries water from the Ruacana River to Oshakati, passing through Outapi. Water from this canal has been used to irrigate a large, government-run farm at Etunda, where crops from maize to watermelon to bananas are grown. The electrical network covers towns including Outapi, Ruacana, Tsandi, Oshikuku, and Okahao.

The region is traversed by a high-standard trunk road which provides a direct link to adjacent regions and the rest of the country. Although passenger and freight transport along this route is easy, the rest of this road network, in common with all the communal areas of northern Namibia, is of poor quality. Okahao and Outapi both have small hospitals, and a network of clinics provides basic services.

Only 17% of households in Omusati have access to improved sanitation (toilet facilities). According to the 2012 Namibia Labour Force Survey, unemployment in the Region is 28.9%. Omusati has 274 schools with a total of 86,365 pupils.

== Politics ==
The region comprises twelve constituencies:

Omusati constituencies (2014)

- Anamulenge
- Elim
- Etayi
- Ogongo
- Okahao
- Okalongo
- Onesi
- Oshikuku
- Otamanzi
- Outapi
- Ruacana
- Tsandi

Electorally, the Omusati region is consistently dominated by the South West Africa People's Organization (SWAPO). For instance, Omusati voters selected SWAPO with 97.68% of their votes in the 2004 parliamentary election, and again with 98% in the 2014 election.

=== Regional elections ===
In the 2004 regional election for the National Assembly of Namibia, SWAPO won in all constituencies by a landslide. In Anamulenge and Otamanzi, no opposition party even nominated a candidate.

The 2015 local and regional elections saw SWAPO obtain 99.4% of the total votes (2010: 99.0) and win uncontested eight of the twelve Omusati constituencies, and two of the five towns. The remaining four constituencies SWAPO won by a landslide, with results ranging from 89% (Ruacana) to 98% (Ogongo). Although SWAPO's support dropped to 86.5% of the total votes in the 2020 regional election, it again won all constituencies by a large margin.

=== Governors ===
- Erginus Endjala (2015–2025)
- Immanuel Shikongo (July 2025–)

== Demographics ==
As of 2023, Omusati is home to 316,671 inhabitants. In the general population, women outnumber men, with only 87 males per 100 females. The population is majority rural, with only 11.1% living in urban settlements. The population density is 11.9 people per km^{2}. 5.7% of residents are not Namibian citizens. There are 72,437 private households, averaging 4.2 members. The population is growing at an annual rate of 2.2%, with a fertility rate of 4.3 children per woman. 14.7% is under 5, 27.3% 5-14, 29.2% 15-34, 18.4% 35-59, and 10.4% over 60.

=== Marriage status ===
26% of the adult population is married, either with a certificate (16%), traditionally (4.1%), in a consensual union (1.3%), divorced (0.1%), or widowed (4.2%). The population generally marries older, with only 0.4% of the current youth population married before age 18.

=== Education and employment ===
The literacy rate has decreased from 2011 to 84.1%. 22.0% percent of pre-primary youth attend Early Childhood Development (ECD) programs. The maximum level of educational attainment is mostly primary (45.8%), with only 19.6% pursuing secondary education and 8% pursuing tertiary education. 12.3% have no educational attainment. 27.0% of inhabitants earn a wage or salary as their primary source of income, 26.3% receive an old-age pension, 19.5% rely on farming, and 7.6% are involved in non-farming business. In 2011, the unemployment rate was 35%, and 59% of residents were not in the labor force due to being a student (31%), a homemaker (49%), or retired (19%).

=== Technology access ===
From 2011 to 2023, technology access largely improved. As of 2023, 89.9% of the population has access to safe drinking water, compared to 51.6% in 2011. 42.2% have access to toilet facilities, a 21.1% increase. The proportion of the population that has access to electricity for lighting has risen from 9% to 20.2% since 2011. Access to the internet has risen to 15.3%, while cellphone ownership is relatively similar at 46.4% (from 44.3% in 2011).
