= Education in Namibia =

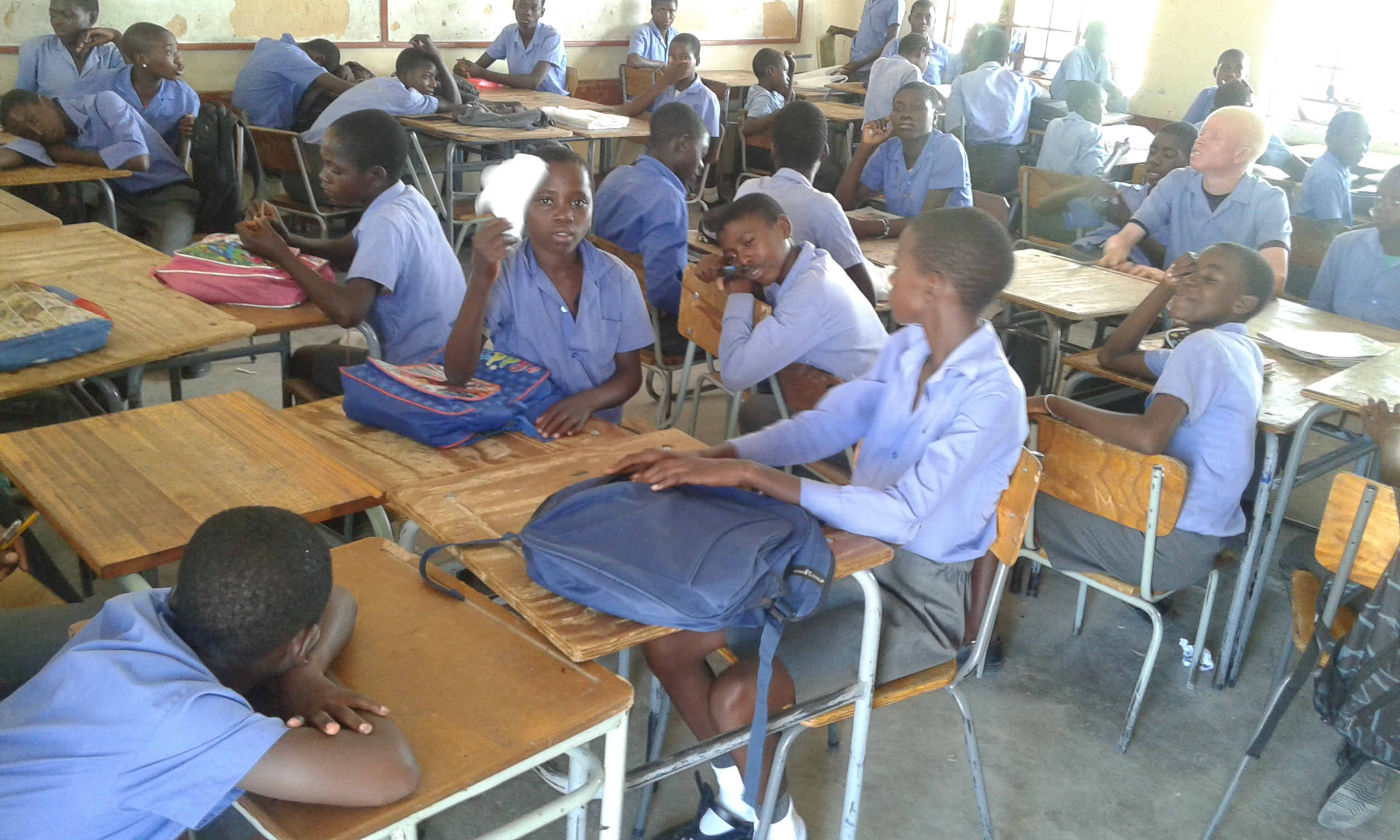
School children sitting in a classroom in Namibia

Education in Namibia is compulsory until the year a learner turns 18. There are approximately 1900 schools in Namibia of which 100 are privately owned. Namibian subjects' syllabi are based on the International General Certificate of Secondary Education and Advanced Subsidiary Level which is part of Cambridge International. The Constitution directs the government to provide free primary education; however, families must pay fees for uniforms, stationery, books, hostels, and school improvements. Among sub-Saharan African countries, Namibia has one of the highest literacy rates.

== History ==
=== Before independence ===
Before Namibia's independence, the country's education system was designed to reinforce apartheid rather than provide the necessary human resource base to promote equitable social and economic development. It was fragmented along racial and ethnic lines, with vast disparities in both the allocation of resources and the quality of education offered.

=== After independence ===
The new Government of the Republic of Namibia (GRN) set about to create one unified structure for education administration. Currently, Namibia allocates more than 20% of its national budget to education. This represents six to seven percent of Namibia's total GDP and is one of the three countries with the highest percentage of GDP directed toward education in the world. Educational institutions in Namibia and their portfolio are accredited by the Namibia Qualifications Authority (NQA). This institution evaluates and accredits national institutions and degrees, as well as foreign qualifications of people who wish to demonstrate the national equivalence of their degrees earned abroad.

Researchers from the United States Agency for International Development opine that the investment is paying off. A new, uniform and learner-centered curriculum for grades one through twelve, finalized in 1998, has received recognition beyond Namibia's borders and significant progress has been made in the use of English (which replaced Afrikaans as the nation's official language) as a medium of instruction. About 95 percent of school age children attend school and the number of teachers has increased by almost 30 percent since 1990. Over 3000 new classrooms have been built. As a result of these improvements, repetition rates in all grades have been reduced. Whereas in 1991, half the learners in grade 1 were repeating the grade, by 2003, over 84 percent of learners were earning their promotions on time. Dropout rates have also plummeted.

On the other hand, Namibia's former Minister of Education Abraham Iyambo summarily described the Namibian education system as "crippled", citing dropout rates, lack of teaching facilities, financial difficulties, sub-standard vocational training, and absence of pre-primary development. A National Conference on Education, running from 27 June to 1 July 2011, was conferred to address the most pressing issues.

The Namibian education system is experiencing many obstacles. It is faced with serious weaknesses in the provision of education to all. Additionally the quality of education, quality of teachers and the performance of learners is unsatisfactory. The Ministry of Education is drafting an improvement program that is known as the ETSIP (Education and Training Sector Improvement Program). The ETSIP aims to align the entire Namibian education system to Namibia's Vision 2030 and the needs of the Namibian population.

In all government schools, primary education is free since 2013, and secondary education since 2016. Tertiary educational institutions, both private and public, charge tuition fees. Corporal punishment is not allowed.

== Sectors ==
The curriculum development, educational research, and professional development of school teachers is centrally organised by the National Institute for Educational Development (NIED) in Okahandja.

=== Pre-primary education ===
The Namibian government introduced a three-year pre-primary education pilot programme in 2008. This programme was subsequently given a two-year extension and thus run till 2013. It aims at giving children from poor backgrounds access to pre-primary education and is aimed at children between the ages of five and six. The programme requires the implementation of pre-primary education at primary schools. The progress on the pilot programme thus far:

- Khomas Region - 21 of the 67 primary schools have introduced pre-primary education.
- ǁKaras Region - 18 out of 38 primary schools have introduced pre-primary education.
- Caprivi Region - 24 primary schools have introduced pre-primary education.
- Ohangwena Region - 27 of the 138 primary schools have introduced pre-primary education.

=== Primary education ===
Compulsory education starts at primary education level at an age of 6. Primary education consists of seven years from Grade 1 to Grade 7 to prepare children for secondary education. The Namibian Government introduced free primary education in 2013.

=== Secondary education ===
Secondary education stretches over a period of 5 years from Grade 8 to Grade 12. Children are presented with a National Senior Secondary Certificate Ordinary level (NSSCO) after successful completion of Grade 11.

Grade 12 admission is only granted to learners who obtain at least C symbols in two NSSCO subjects and a D in English. After successful completion of Grade 12 learners are presented with a National Senior Secondary Certificate Advanced Subsidiary (NSSCAS).

Grade 11 or 12 cannot be repeated on a full-time basis, for learners that wish to pursue further studies they need to obtain a good grade as per the requirements of tertiary institution both locally or abroad. The Evaluation Scale for Grade 12 is:

=== Tertiary education ===
==== Universities and colleges ====
Namibia has two public tertiary institutions of general education, the Namibia University of Science and Technology (NUST) and the University of Namibia (UNAM) and one private university, the International University of Management (IUM).

For determining admission to tertiary education in Namibia, school grades are converted into points as follows:

	NSSCO (Grade 11)	NSSCAS (Grade 12)
Symbol obtained	A B C D E F G	A B C D E
Equivalent points	7 6 5 4 3 2 1	10 9 8 7 6

As of 2022 UNAM requires 27 points from five subjects, with two subjects on NSSCAS level, and a C symbol in English. NUST requires 25 points from five subjects, and an E in English. IUM requires 25 points from five subjects, and a D in English.

There are a number of specialised tertiary educational institutions such as the College of the Arts (Cota) in Windhoek, The University Centre for Studies in Namibia (TUCSIN) in Windhoek, Oshakati, Rundu, and Rehoboth, the Namibian Maritime and Fisheries Institute (NAMFI) in Walvis Bay, and the Namibian Institute of Mining and Technology (NIMT) in Arandis.

==== Vocational education ====
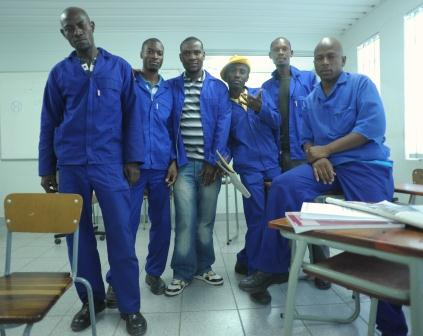
Namibian plumbing students

The Namibian Training Authority (NTA) controls seven vocational centers and supports a number of other institutions like Namwater. They offer a range of courses for school leavers, including; Plumbing, Welding, Electrical general, Automotive electrical, Bricklaying, Cabinet making, Technical drawing, Dressmaking, Hospitality, Office management and Automotive mechanics.

Vocational students in Namibia are given a small amount of money from the government to assist them in attending Vocational Training Centers.

== Statistics ==
According to the World Factbook, Namibia has one of the highest literacy rates among sub-Saharan African countries. As of 2018, 91.5% of the population age 15 and over can read and write.

In 1997, the gross primary enrollment rate was 130.6 percent, and the net primary enrollment rate was 91.2 percent. According to the Ministry of Labor's child labor survey, 80 percent of working children between the ages of 6 and 18 continue to attend school while they are employed. In 1998, there were 400,325 Namibian students in primary school and 115,237 students in secondary schools. The pupil-teacher ratio in 1999 was estimated at 32:1, with about 8% of the GDP being spent on education.

In 2011 the Namibian education system accommodated approximately 600,000 learners of which 174,000 were senior secondary students and below 10,000 were pre-primary pupils. While teachers are seen as generally adequately educated they lack specialised training. Schools consistently perform below expectation; failure and dropout rates are high. Only 12% of learners proceed into tertiary education of any kind due to limited places in universities and vocational training. In 2019 the number of learners at school had increased to 755,943.
