= Olof Palme Primary School =

School in Windhoek, Namibia

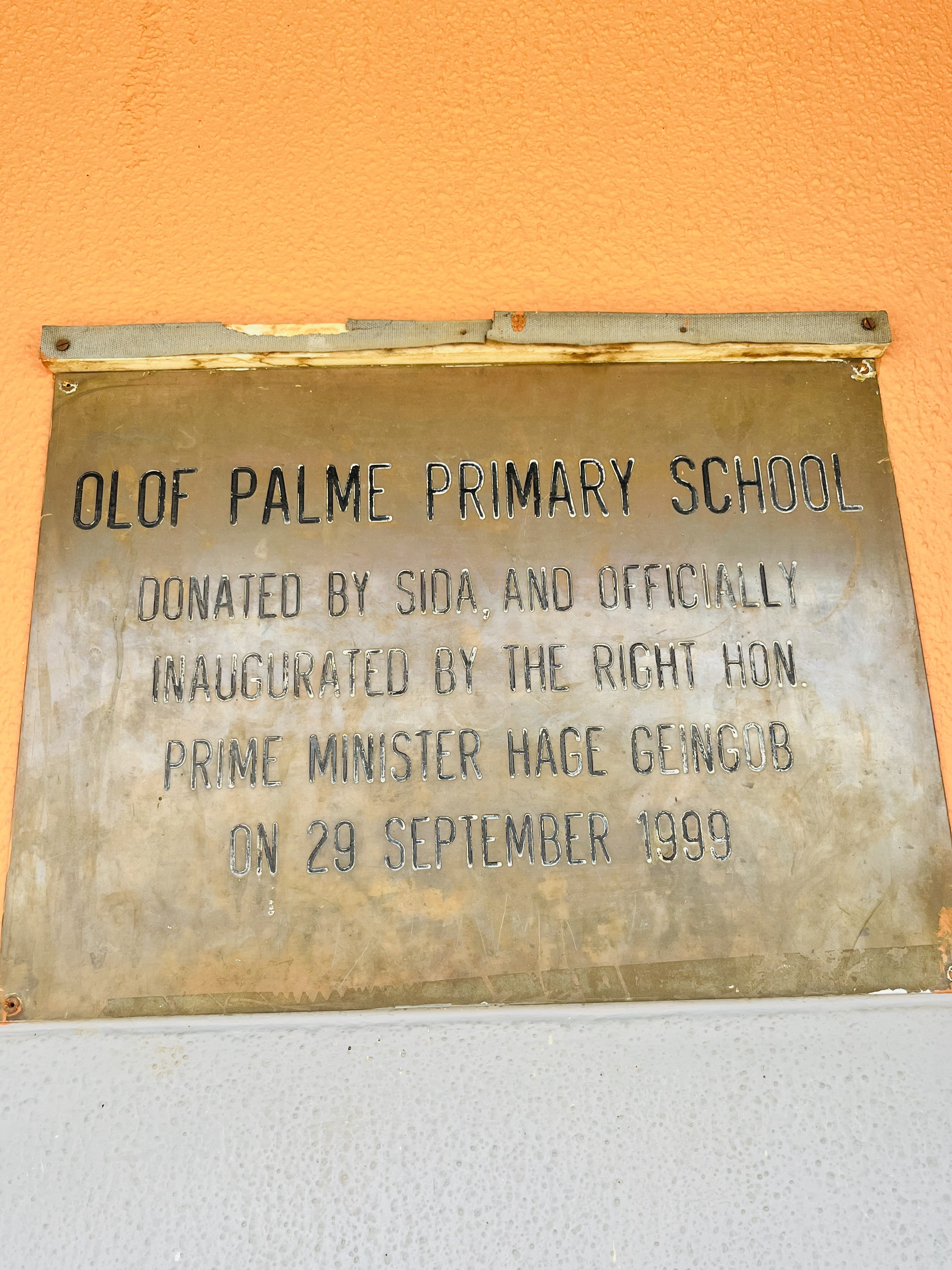
Olof Palme Primary School

Olof Palme Primary School is a public primary school in Windhoek, capital of Namibia. The school is situated in Greenwell suburb, in Samora Machel constituency. Olof Palme is in Einstein cluster and offers classes from grade 0 (pre-primary) until grade 7.

== Personalities ==
Olaf Palme Primary School was inaugurated in 1999. The First principal is Ms Julia Nakashwa Hangula, and the second principal (from 2021) is Ms Jacobine Ndinelao Kakwambi.

== Location ==
Olof Palme Primary School is located on Penelope Street in the Goreangab area of Windhoek, Namibia.

== Recognition ==
In 2015, Olof Palme Primary School was recongnized as a child-friendly school.
