= Erasmus Hendjala =

Namibian politician (born 1947)

Erasmus Hendjala (born 31 December 1947 in Omundudu, Ohangwena Region) is a Namibian politician. Hendjala represented the Hakahana constituency and later Tobias Hainyeko constituency in Katutura, Windhoek, Khomas Region as a member of the ruling South West Africa People's Organization (SWAPO) from 1993 until August 2008. In 2008, Hendjala was abruptly expelled via letter for "serious misconduct and violation of the SWAPO constitution". A month later, Hendjala joined the Rally for Democracy and Progress and announced he would contest the regional by-election in October 2008, which was forced by his expulsion from SWAPO. However, three opposition parties including Hendjala's RDP withdrew prior to the election, ensuring an easy SWAPO victory. His wife, a member of the SWAPO women's council, did not leave SWAPO with her husband.
