= Hakahana =

Suburb of Windhoek

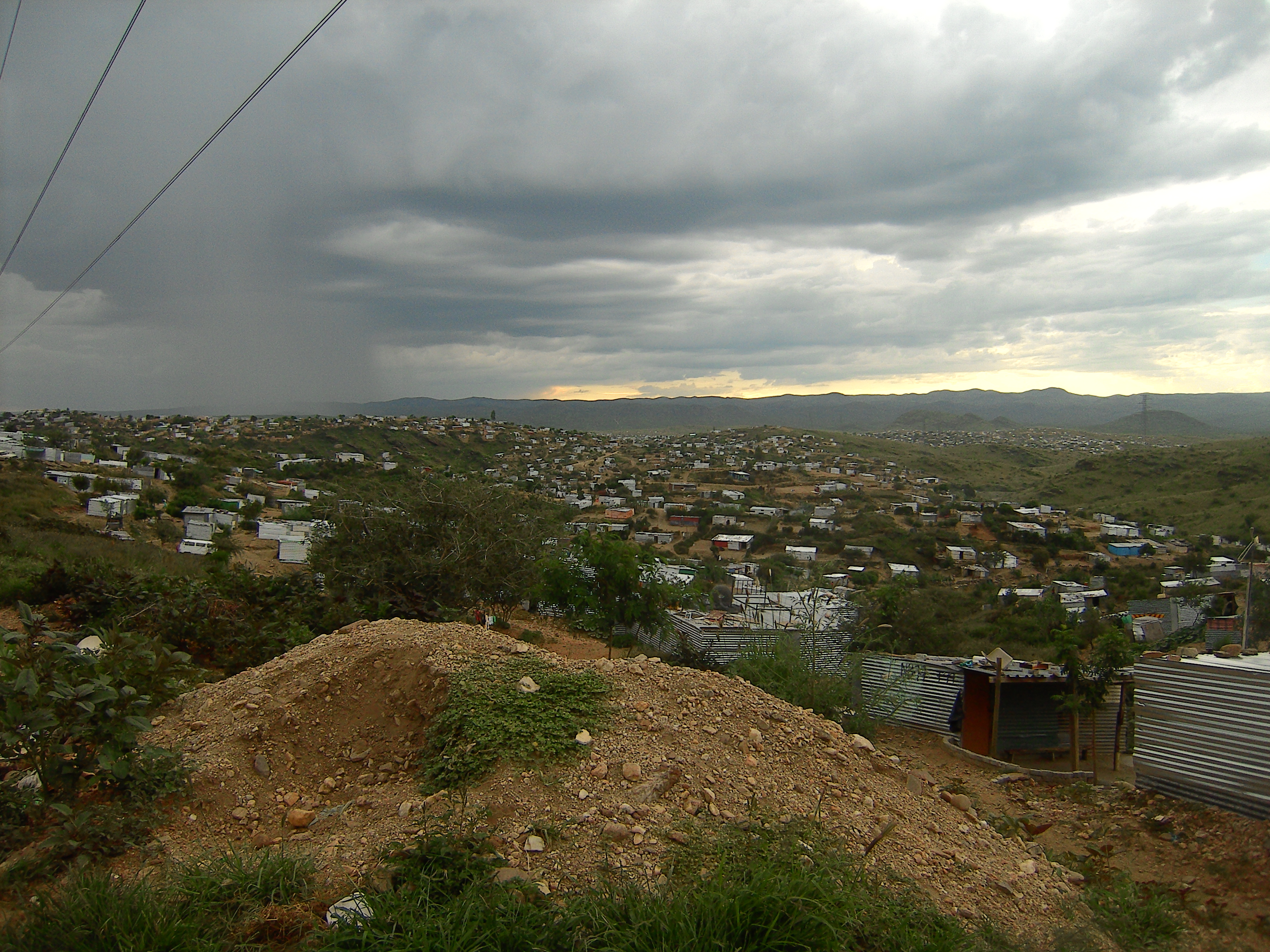
- Shacks in Hakahana (2011)

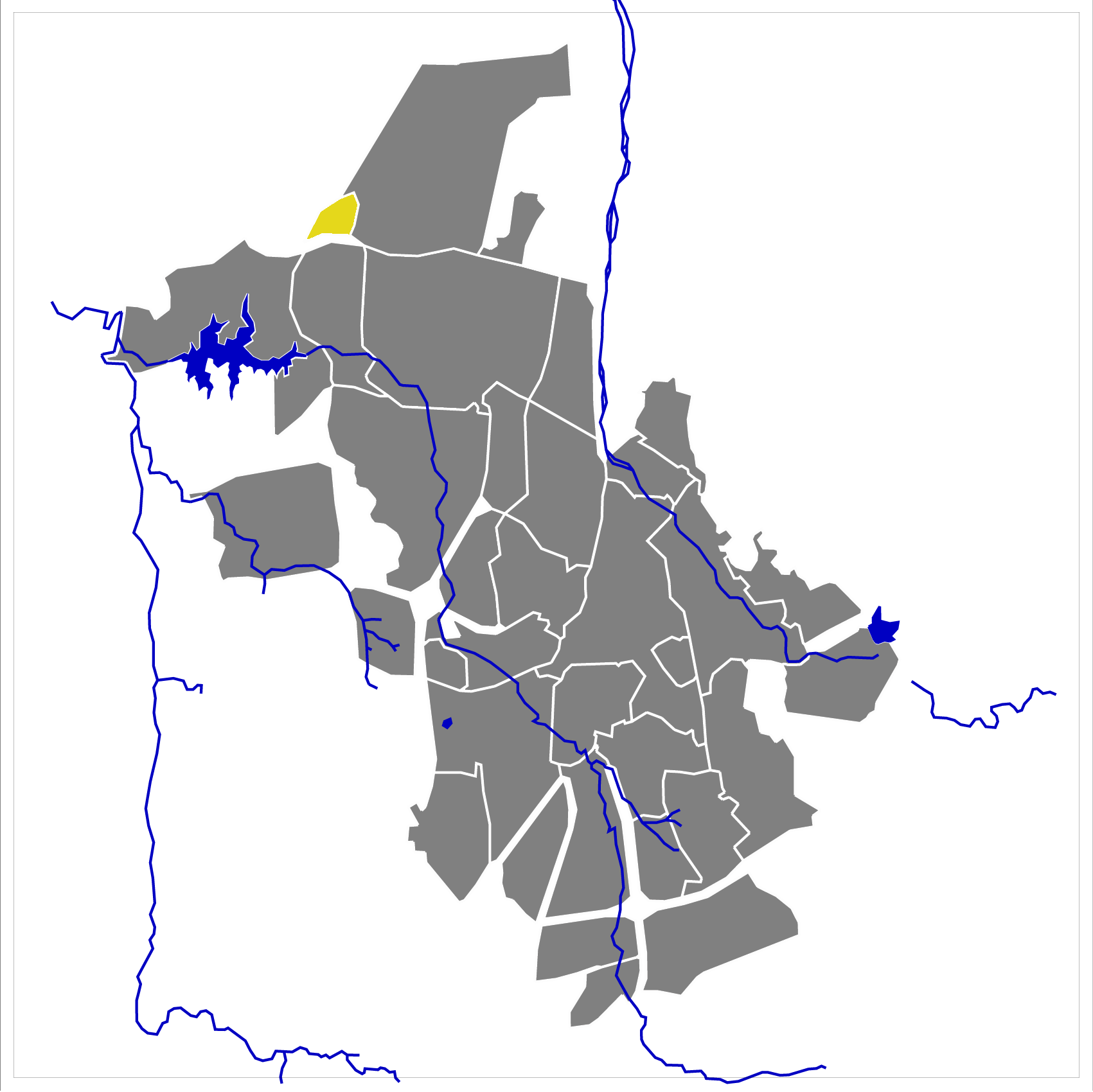
- Suburb Hakahana (yellow) in the City of Windhoek

- Hakahana in Namibia
- Coordinates: 22°30′25″S 17°6′12″E
- Country: Namibia
- Time zone: UTC+2 (South African Standard Time)

Hakahana is a suburb of Windhoek, the capital of Namibia. The township is situated in the north of the town between the suburbs of Katutura, Wanaheda, and Okuryangava.

Hakahana was also a former constituency in the Khomas Region. In 2003, the constituency was split into Eastern Hakahana and Western Hakahana, both soon renamed into Tobias Hainyeko constituency and Moses ǁGaroëb constituency, respectively. Hakahana means "Hurry up" in Otjiherero.
