= Tobias Hainyeko constituency =

Electoral constituency in the Khomas region of central Namibia

Coordinates: 22°31′S 17°3′E

Tobias Hainyeko constituency (red) in Windhoek in the Khomas Region

Tobias Hainyeko constituency (informally also Eastern Hakahana, after the area it covers) is an electoral constituency in Windhoek, the capital of Namibia. It had a population of 45,912 in 2011, up from 34,348 in 2001. As of 2020 it had 36,530 registered voters.

The constituency was created in 2003 at the recommendation of the Third Delimitation Commission which suggested that the constituency of Hakahana be split. Since then, the suburb of Hakahana falls into two different constituencies. The constituency is named after the guerrilla war hero Tobias Hainyeko. The western part of Hakahana falls under Moses ǁGaroëb constituency, after politician Moses ǁGaroëb.

== Politics ==
Hakahana is traditionally a stronghold of the South West Africa People's Organization (SWAPO) party. The first councillor of Tobias Hainyeko constituency was Erasmus Hendjala (SWAPO) who won the 2004 regional election by a landslide, gaining 9,360 of the 10,042 votes cast. Runners-up were Tobias Namundjebo of the Congress of Democrats (CoD, 225 votes), Phillipp Vlermuis of the United Democratic Front (UDF, 221 votes), Joseph Kasari of the Democratic Turnhalle Alliance (DTA, 157 votes), and Dina Pasile of the Republican Party (RP, 49 votes)

The 2015 regional election was also won by SWAPO whose Christopher Likuwa gained 8,631 votes. Kaptein Erasmus Hendjala, now a candidate for the Rally for Democracy and Progress (RDP), finished distant second with 568 votes. Likuwa was re-elected in the 2020 regional election, albeit by a much smaller margin. He received 4,724 votes, followed by Emrick Nangolo of the Independent Patriots for Change (IPC), an opposition party formed in August 2020, with 2,831 votes.
