= Greenwell Matongo =

Namibian freedom fighter

Greenwell Simasiku Matongo (1945–1979) was a Namibian freedom fighter and political commissar in the People's Liberation Army of Namibia (PLAN), the military wing of SWAPO. Matongo joined SWAPO in exile during Namibia's struggle for independence from South African rule in the mid 1960s. He spent time in Tanzania and trained new PLAN recruits at a SWAPO military camp in Kongwa. Matongo rose through the ranks of PLAN and became a highly respected commander. He was killed in combat on 15 June 1979 during a battle between UNITA and South African forces in Ondjiva, Angola.

The Greenwell Matongo suburb in Windhoek's Goreangab and Greenwell Matongo Primary School in Katima Mulilo are named for him.
