= Aili Venonya =

Namibian politician (1963–2022)

Personal details
- Born: 1963
- Died: 2022 (aged 58–59)
- Profession: Politician

Aili Venonya (1963–2022) was a Namibian politician who served as a regional authority councillor for Moses Garoëb Constituency.

== Career ==
Venonya was the founder and managing director of Aili Catering and Training Services, which was founded in 2010.

== Community work ==
Venonya was a volunteer at the Cancer Association of Namibia, a recovery programme supported by breast cancer patients. Venonya served as a board member for Ombili Community Centre.
