= Samora Machel Constituency =

Electoral constituency in the Khomas region of central Namibia

Coordinates: 22°31′07″S 17°02′13″E

Samora Machel constituency (red) in the Khomas Region

Samora Machel Constituency (formerly known as Wanaheda Constituency) is a constituency in Windhoek in the Khomas Region of central Namibia. The constituency is located across four northern suburbs of Windhoek: Wanaheda, Greenwell Matongo, Goreangab, and part of Havana. It had a population of 50,110 in 2011, up from 29,382 in 2001. As of 2020 it had 45,962 registered voters.

Most of the residents of this constituency are formally unemployed and derive their income from informal employment and small enterprises like shebeens and car washes. The impact of HIV/AIDS is high.

== Name change ==
The area which made up the constituency was named Wanaheda during colonial times, an acronym for 'Wambos, Namas, Hereros and Damaras', the four peoples that were allowed to live here. In 2003, following governmental and public recommendations, the constituency was renamed in honour of Mozambican President Samora Machel. The suburb itself still carries the old name.

== Politics ==
Wanaheda is traditionally a stronghold of the South West Africa People's Organization (SWAPO) party. The 2004 regional election was won by John Ya Otto Nankudhu (SWAPO) with 8,370 votes of the 10,105 votes cast. Runners-up were Victoria Gawanas of the United Democratic Front (UDF, 594 votes), Fransiska Hipondoka of the Congress of Democrats (CoD, 475 votes), Gabriel Rukero of the National Unity Democratic Organisation (NUDO, 380 votes), and Adolf Kaurimuje of the Democratic Turnhalle Alliance (DTA, 201 votes).

The 2015 regional election were also won by SWAPO whose Fanuel San Shivute gained 8,774 votes. Tuyenikelao Kanyiki of the Rally for Democracy and Progress (RDP) finished distant second with 1,078 votes. The SWAPO candidate also won the 2020 regional election, albeit by a much smaller margin. Nestor Kalola received 4,802 votes. Erastus Kupololo of the Independent Patriots for Change (IPC), an opposition party formed in August 2020, came second with 3,402 votes.
