= Greenwell Matongo (suburb) =

Greenwell Matongo is a quarter in the suburb Goreangab in Windhoek, the capital city of Namibia. This residential area is known for its many shebeens and bars. This area is known for its vibrant community and has been the focus of various development initiatives, including the renovation of the Onghendambala Open Market to empower local SMEs. Despite its synonymous association with informal entertainment areas, Greenwell Matongo is host to a community library, the Greenwell Matongo Community Library for the benefit of its residents.

Greenwell Matongo is named after Namibian freedom fighter, Greenwell Matongo, who was born in 1945. Matongo was a political commissar of the People's Liberation Army of Namibia (PLAN), who died in combat in Angola at Onjiva on 15 June 1979.
