= Immanuel Shifidi Secondary School =

High school in Windhoek, Namibia

- Namibia

Information
- Type: Secondary School
- School district: Katutura, Windhoek

Immanuel Shifidi Secondary School is a public school in Windhoek, Namibia. The school was known as Katutura Secondary School up to 1986 when the name was changed to Immanuel Shifidi Secondary School in honour of the struggle icon and activist that died on its sports field in November 1986.
