= Farm Windhoek =

Recreational area in Windhoek, Namibia

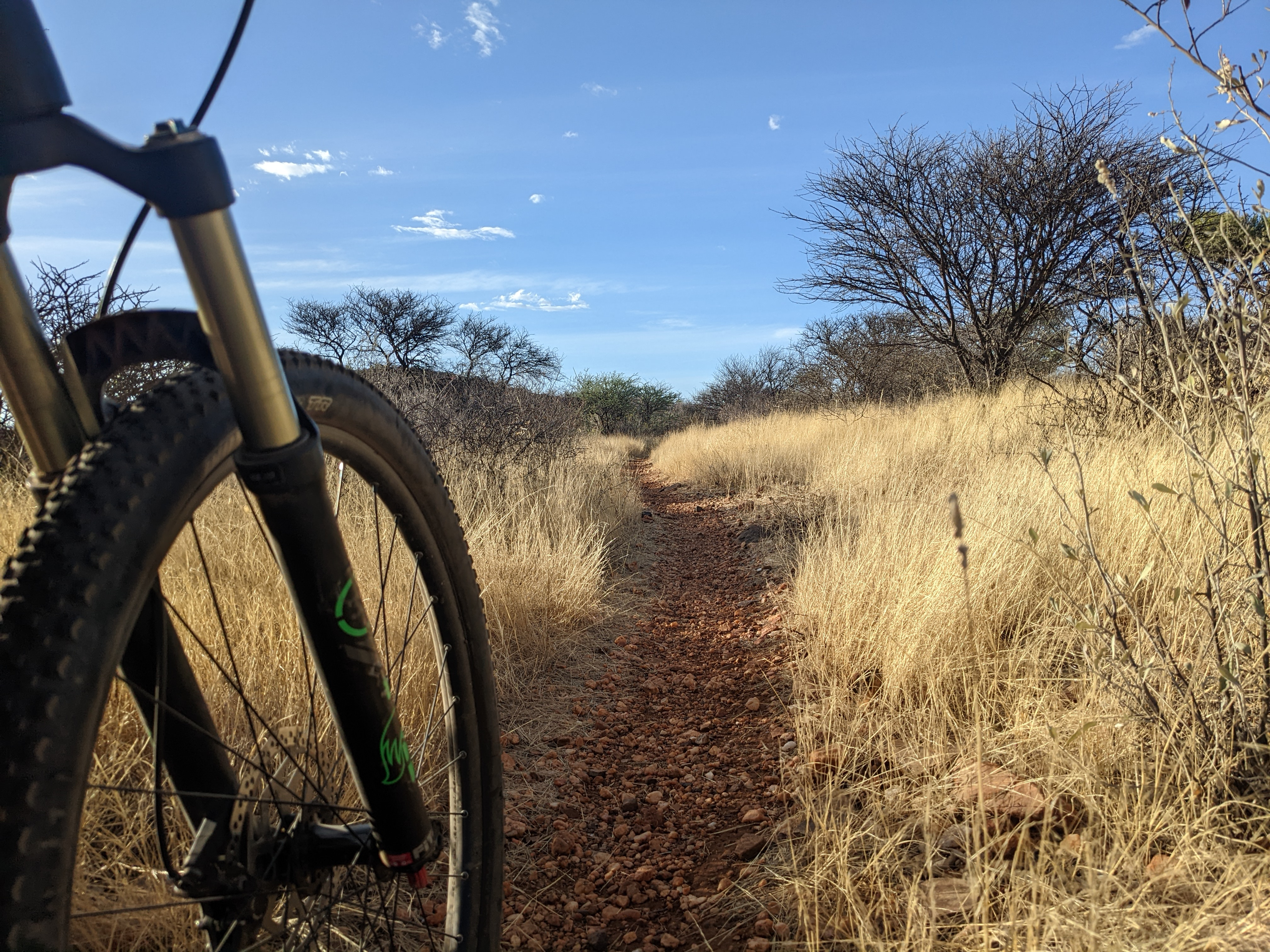
Mountain bike on Farm Windhoek

Farm Windhoek is a commercial farm adjacent to the capital of Namibia, Windhoek, with mixed recreational and agricultural use. It belongs to the City of Windhoek and is leased to different private operators. As a public recreational area its main attraction is a network of hiking and mountain biking trails, spanning over 70 kilometres (43 mi).

The municipality of Windhoek owns five farms that are adjacent to or near the boundaries of the current urban suburbs. Among these farmlands is Farm Windhoek, which is registered under the name Windhoek Townlands Commonage 2. The land measures 6,000 hectares (15,000 acres).

== Recreational activities ==
Recreational sports are a main land use of Farm Windhoek. The Namibian financial company IJG operates a network of trails for hiking and mountain biking that span over 70 kilometres (43 mi) in combined trail length and are marketed under the name IJG Trails. For the operation of the recreational trails, the private sector company Farmwindhoek Adventure Tourism was registered in 2014. The trails are open to the public, but an entrance fee applies.

Farm Windhoek is regularly used as venue for sporting events, such as mountain biking races and running competitions.

== Other activities ==
Farm Windhoek is partitioned for different land uses. Around 321 hectares (790 acres) are occupied by military installations and barracks and around 42 hectares (100 acres) by housing of the Namibia Defense Force. On around 27 hectares (67 acres) a police village is established. Farm Windhoek is also leased by the City of Windhoek for agricultural land use, mainly livestock herding.
