= Immanuel Shifidi =

Namibian activist

Immanuel Hafeni Augustus Shifidi
- Born: 16 July 1929; Windhoek, South West Africa (now Windhoek, Namibia)
- Died: 30 November 1986 (aged 57); Katutura, Windhoek, South West Africa
- Military career
- Allegiance: Namibia
- Conflicts: Namibian War of Independence

Immanuel Hafeni Augustus Shifidi (16 July 1929 – 30 November 1986), born in Windhoek, was a Namibian activist. He was one of the fighters at Omugulugwombashe on 26 August 1966 when eight helicopters of the South African Defence Force attacked SWAPO guerrilla fighters at the camp. It was the first armed battle in the Namibian War of Independence.

== Arrest and Assassination ==
Immanuel Shifidi was arrested and tortured after the defeat at Omugulugwombashe. He was convicted under the Terrorism Act and received a death sentence. Following international pressure, the sentence was converted to life in prison at Robben Island. He served 18 years of this sentence and was released in December 1985. On 30 November 1986, he was assassinated at a SWAPO rally marking the United Nations International Year of Peace. While attending a rally with other Swapo members in Katutura, the enemies released bees which disrupted the meeting. Amid the confusion, they gunned down Shifidi in cold blood. Shifidi was buried in a coffin draped in the SWAPO flag on 6 December 1986. The funeral of the Swapo veteran was the first mass political gathering of its sort in Namibia for many years.

== Trial ==
In a controversial decision, President Botha on 22 March 1988, stopped the trial of four members of the SADF and of two members of the SWATF who were to have stood trial in Windhoek charged with the murder of the SWAPO veteran. The inquest into the death of Shifidi had revealed an Army conspiracy to disrupt an authorized SWAPO rally held at Katutura township outside Windhoek. The inquest had heard that 54 members of the SADF 101 battalion (composed of black Namibian volunteers) based at Ondangwa had been transported to Windhoek on the day before the rally wearing civilian clothes and carrying assorted weapons, they infiltrated the rally and attacked SWAPO supporters. A police inquiry following the inquest concluded that the six men subsequently charged had conspired to disrupt the rally using violent means. The soldiers were named as Col. Johannes H. Vorster and Cmdt. Antonie Botes of the SWATF headquarters in Windhoek; Col. Willem H. Welgemoed, commanding officer of 101 battalion; and Lt. Nicolaas Prinsloo, Cpl. Eusebius Kashimbi and Pte. Steven Festus, all of 101 battalion. The trial was halted under the terms of Section 103 of the Defence Act, under which members of the security forces were exempt from criminal or civilian court action if they had acted in good faith in the suppression of ‘terrorism’.

A school where Immanuel Shifidi was killed was known as Katutura Secondary School up to 1986 when the name was changed to Immanuel Shifidi Secondary School in honour of the struggle icon that died on its sports field in November 1986.

Immanuel Shifidi was a brother of Ferdinand Shifidi, the councilor of Endola Constituency in Ohangwena Region.

== See also ==
- List of unsolved murders (1980–1999)
