= Olympia (Windhoek) =

District of Windhoek

Coordinates: 22.605833°S 17.098611°E

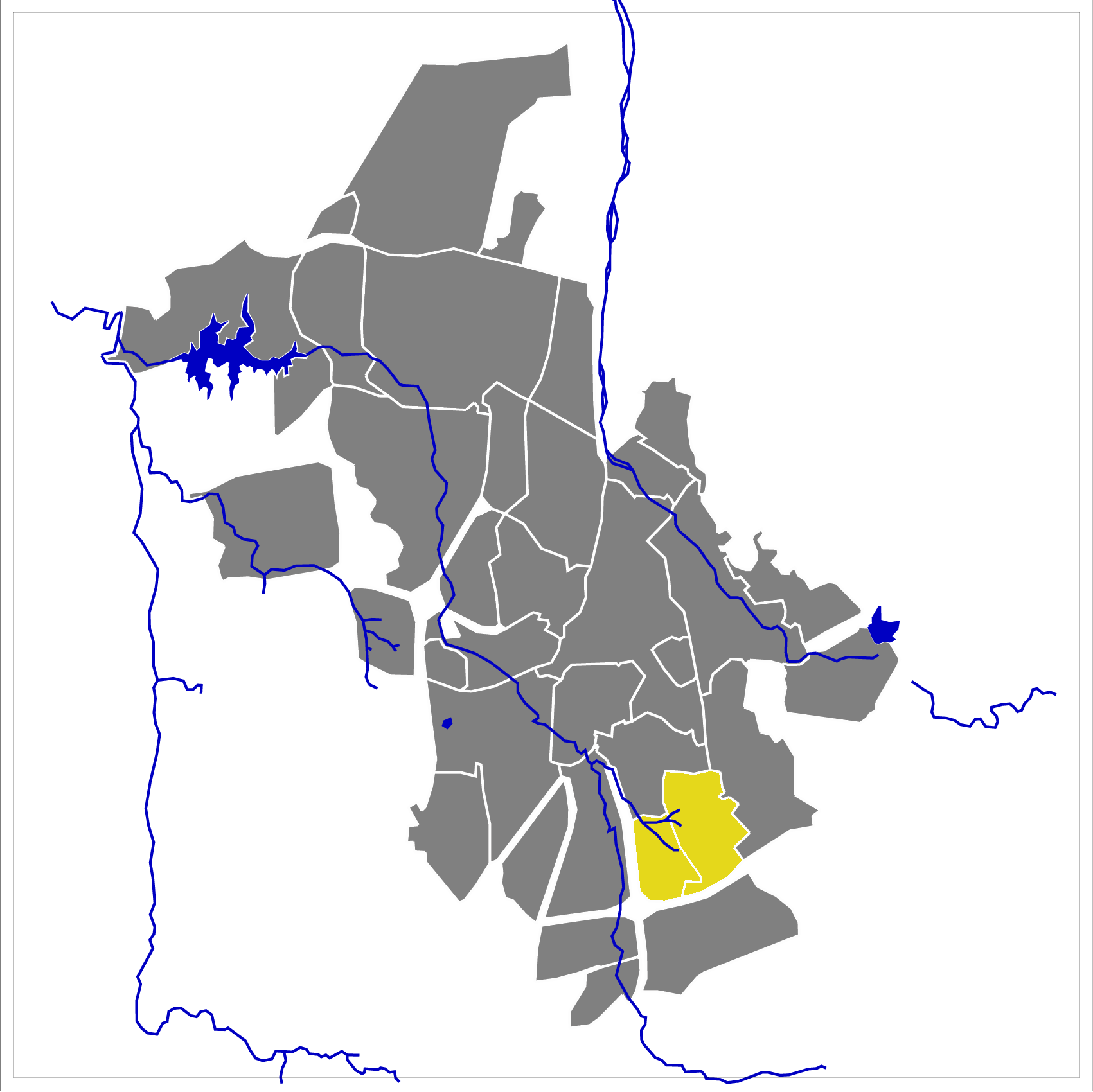
Olympia suburb (yellow) of Windhoek

Olympia is an affluent district of Windhoek, the capital of Namibia.

== History ==
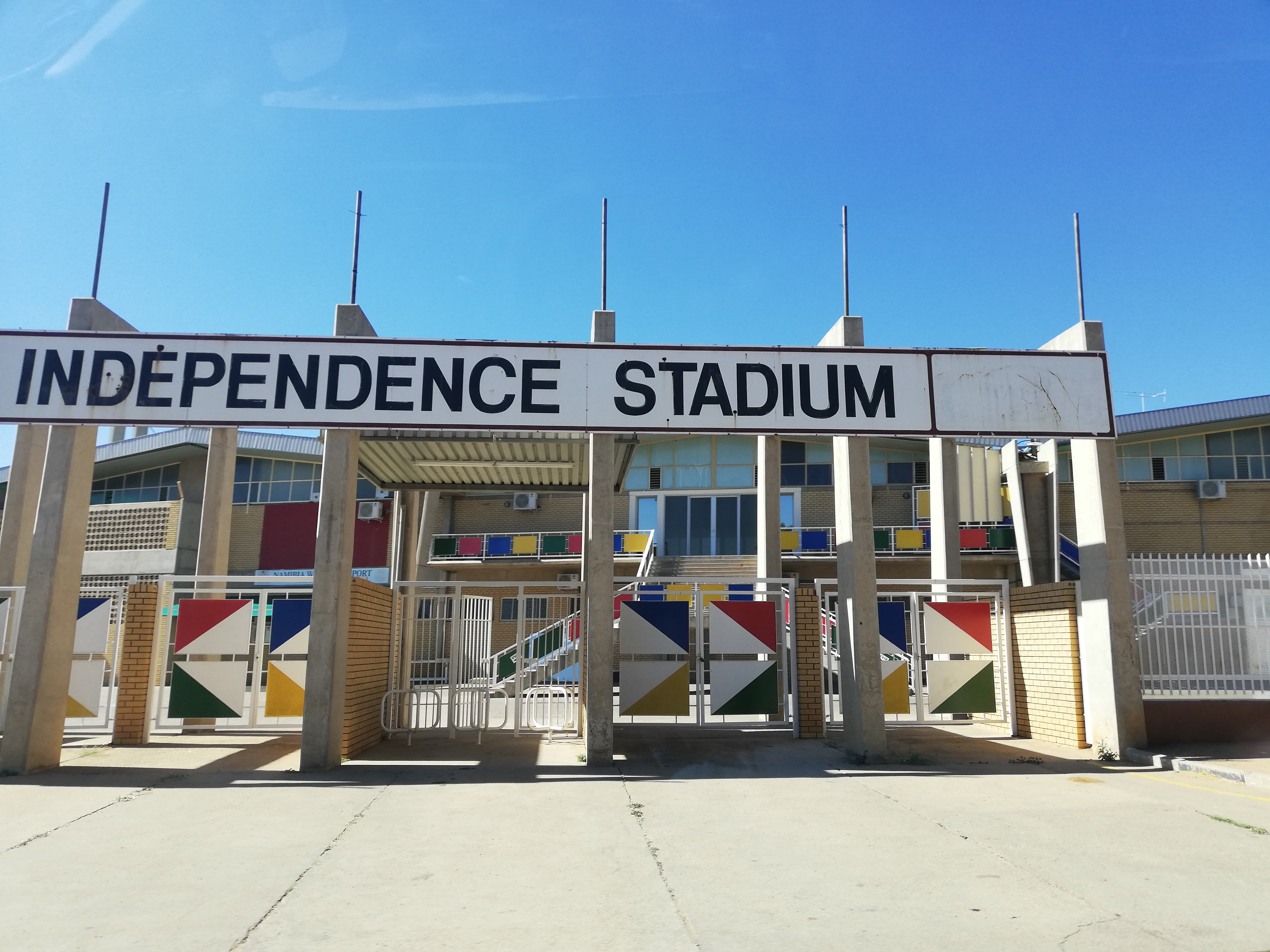
Entrance of the Independence Stadium in the Olympia suburb of Windhoek

The suburb Olympia was founded in the 1980s. The suburb was originally at the outskirts of Windhoek, but increasingly becomes a central part of town as the city expands. Olympia hosts a variety of public sports facilities, including the Independence Stadium, Hage Geingob Rugby Stadium, Olympia Sport Grounds, and Olympia Swimming Pool. Moreover, several private sports clubs reside in Olympia, including SK Windhoek.

Delta Highschool is a large private school in Olympia (previously Deutsche Schule Windhoek).

Several streets are named after sportspersons, such as Frankie Fredericks Drive.

Property prices are in the upper price segment and Olympia is predominantly residential, without industrial zones.

== Literature ==
- Tonchi, Victor L; Lindeke, William A; Grotpeter, John J (2012). Historical Dictionary of Namibia. Historical Dictionaries of Africa, African historical dictionaries (2 ed.). Scarecrow Press. ISBN 9780810879904.
