= Moses ǁGaroëb Constituency =

Electoral constituency in the Khomas region of central Namibia

Coordinates: 22°34′S 17°5′E

Moses ǁGaroëb constituency (red) in the Khomas Region

Moses ǁGaroëb Constituency (informally also Western Hakahana, after the area it covers) is an electoral constituency in Windhoek, the capital of Namibia. It had a population of 45,564 in 2011, up from 25,642 in 2001. As of 2020 it had 41,550 registered voters.

The constituency was created in 2003 at the recommendation of the Third Delimitation Commission which suggested that the constituency of Hakahana be split. Since then, the suburb of Hakahana falls into two different constituencies. The constituency is named after the politician Moses ǁGaroëb. The eastern part of Hakahana falls under Tobias Hainyeko constituency, after politician Tobias Hainyeko.

== Politics ==
Hakahana is traditionally a stronghold of the South West Africa People's Organization (SWAPO) party. The first councillor of Moses ǁGaroëb Constituency was Helena Andreas (SWAPO) who won the 2004 regional election by a landslide, gaining 7,773 of the 8,348 votes cast.

In the 2015 regional election SWAPO also won by a landslide. Its candidate Martin David was elected with 5,330 votes, while the only opposition candidate, Paulus Shikwamhanda of the Rally for Democracy and Progress (RDP) received 286 votes. The SWAPO candidate also won the 2020 regional election, albeit by a much smaller margin. Aili Venonya received 5,983 votes. Tommy Efraim of the Independent Patriots for Change (IPC), an opposition party formed in August 2020, came second with 3,960 votes. Following the dearth of Aili Venonya in October 2020, Swapo party candidate Stefanus Ndengu won the Moses ǁGaroëb constituency by-election after receiving 2 970 votes, in January 2023.
