= Okuryangava =

Suburb of Windhoek, Namibia

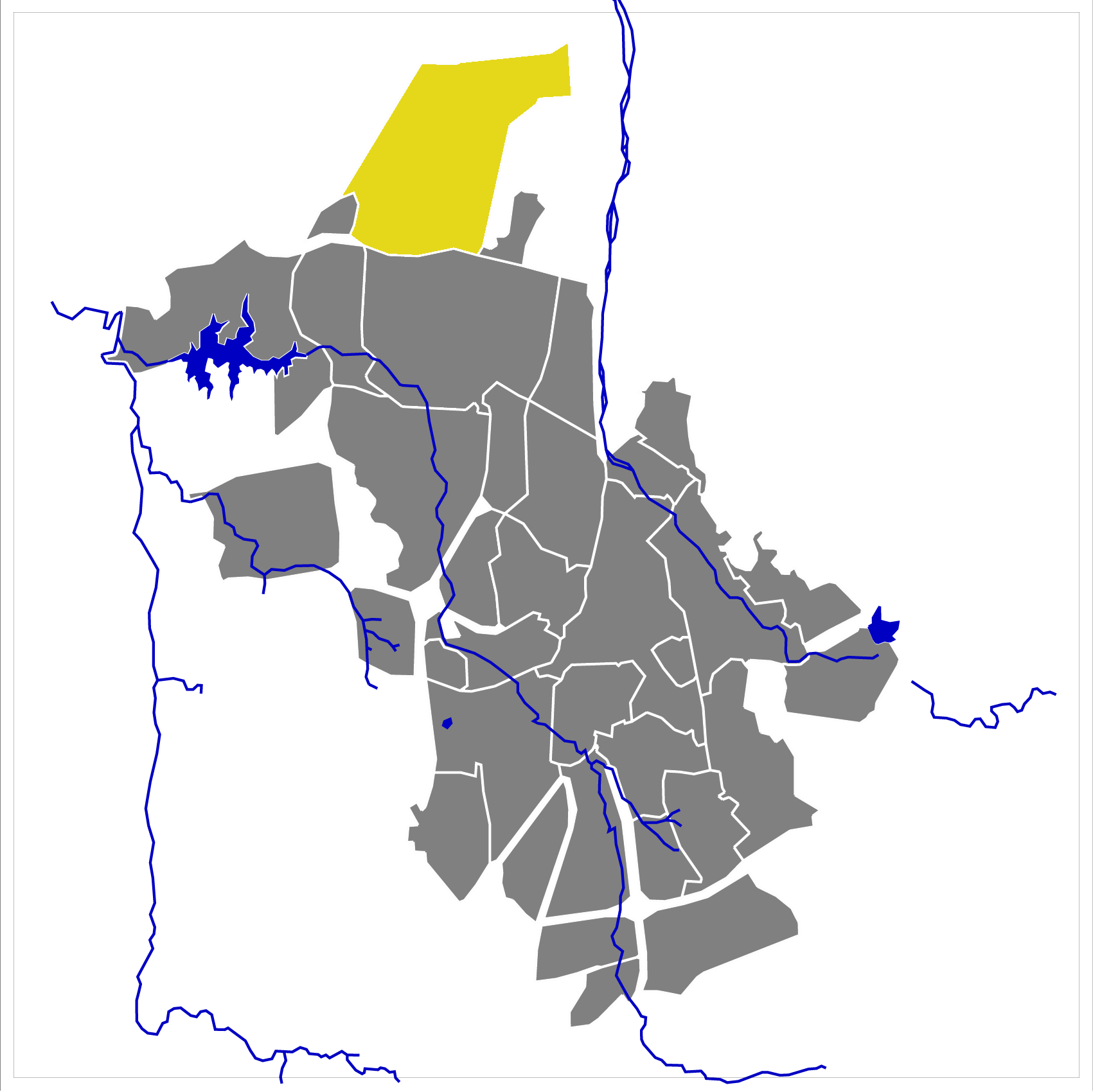
Map of Windhoek Suburb Okuryangava

Okuryangava is a suburb of Windhoek, the capital of Namibia. It is a township, situated in the north of the town between the suburbs of Freedomland, Golgota and Ombili in Katutura. Okuryangava is divided into sections, including 74, 79, Women Center, Olyeeta, Monte christo (bus loading zone), Stop and Shop. It has two service stations. Schools such as Tobias Hainyeko Primary School are located there.

Monte Christo and Stop n Shop are two large shopping centers. They host bus loading stations for travel to the northern regions of the country. Olyeeta and Tukondjeni are open markets.
