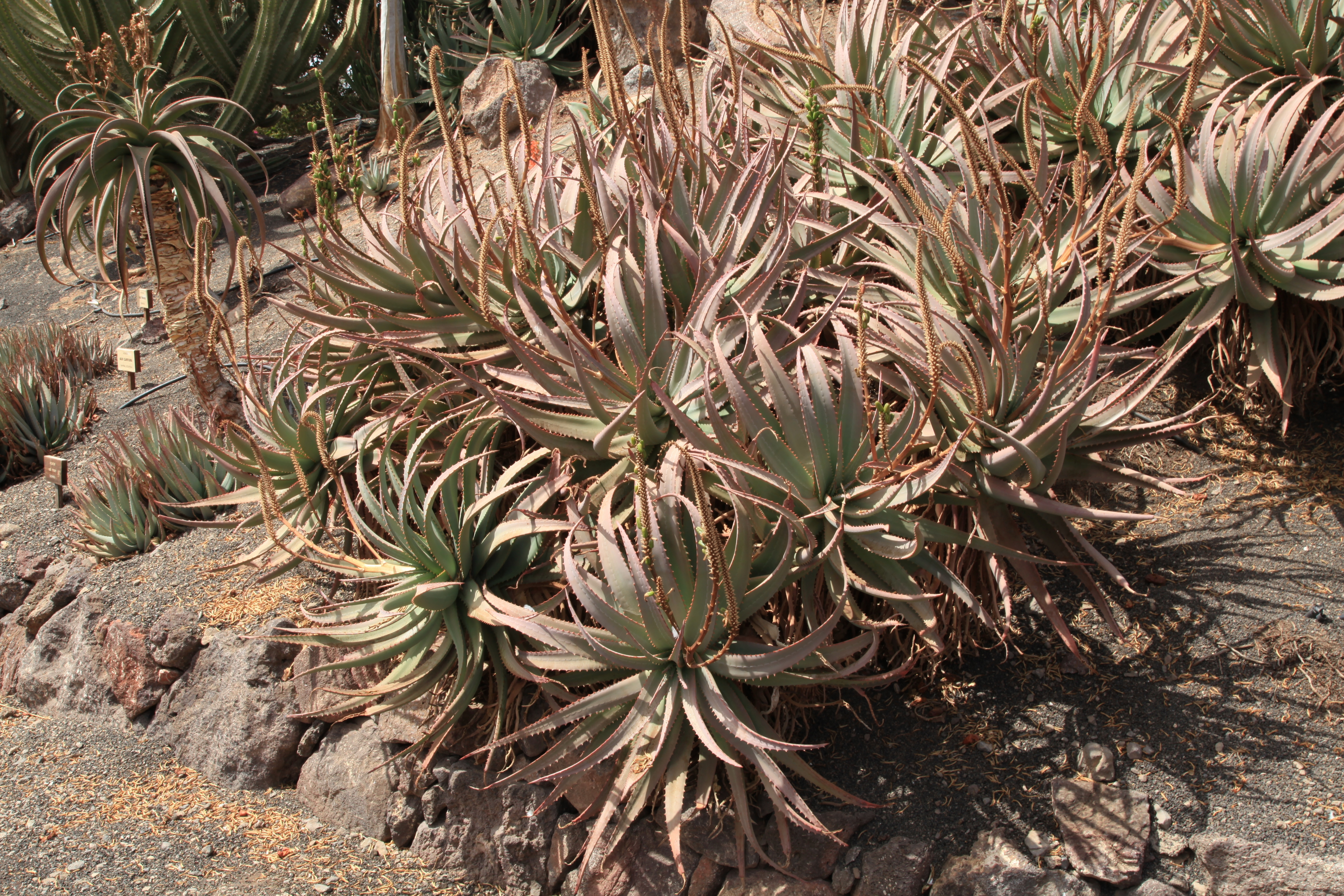

Conservation status
- Least Concern (IUCN 3.1)
- CITES Appendix II

Scientific classification
- Kingdom: Plantae
- Clade: Tracheophytes
- Clade: Angiosperms
- Clade: Monocots
- Order: Asparagales
- Family: Asphodelaceae
- Subfamily: Asphodeloideae
- Genus: Aloe
- Species: A. littoralis

Binomial name
- Aloe littoralis Baker

Synonyms
- Aloe angolensis Baker; Aloe rubrolutea Schinz; Aloe schinzii Baker

= Aloe littoralis =

Species of succulent

Aloe littoralis is a flowering plant in the Asphodelaceae family. It is a succulent native to arid regions in South Tropical Africa and Southern Africa.

== See also ==
- Succulent plants
