= Goreangab Dam =

Dam in Namibia

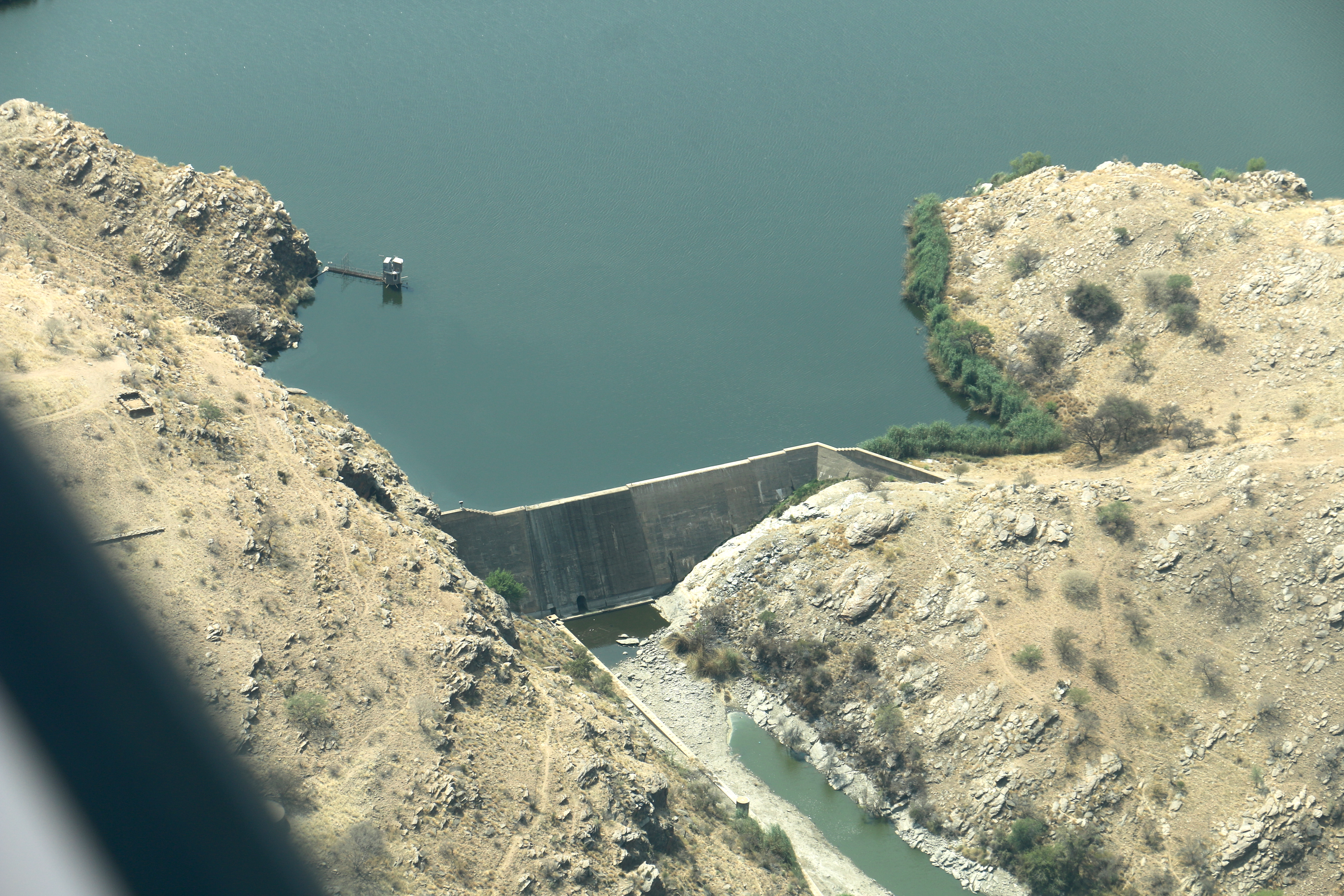

- Location within Namibia
- Official name: Goreangab Dam
- Country: Namibia
- Location: Windhoek, Khomas Region
- Coordinates: 22°31′0″S 17°1′0″E
- Opening date: 1958

Dam and spillways
- Impounds: Arebbusch River
- Height: 17 m (56 ft)

Reservoir
- Total capacity: 3.6 million cubic metres (4,700,000 cu yd)
- Surface area: 1.1 km^{2} (270 acres)

Goreangab Dam is a dam in the north-western suburbs of Windhoek, the capital of Namibia. It dams the ephemeral Arebbusch River and its tributary, the Gammams River, which both run across Windhoek. The reservoir behind the dam has a capacity of 3.6 million cubic metres (4,700,000 cu yd).

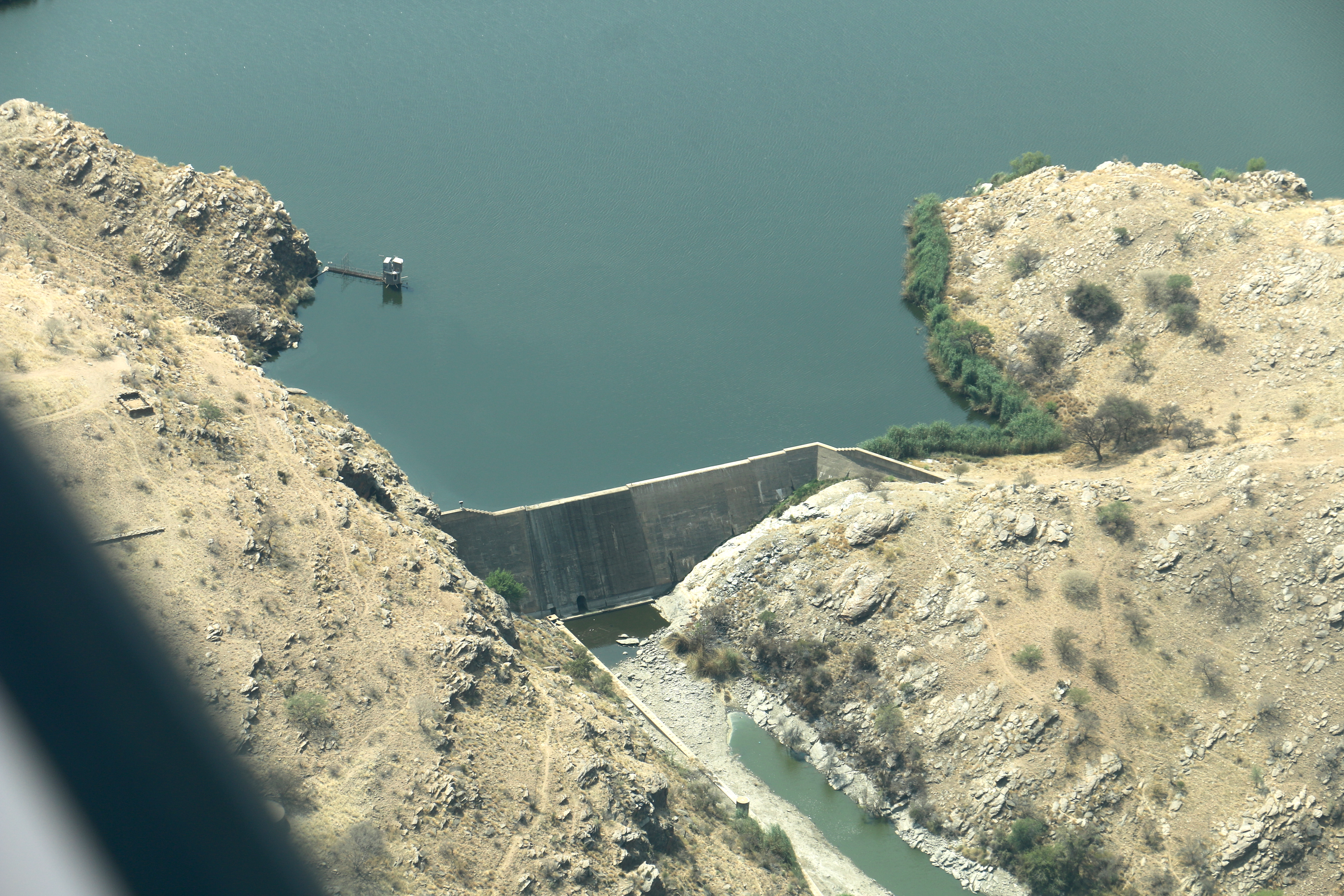
Goreangab Dam

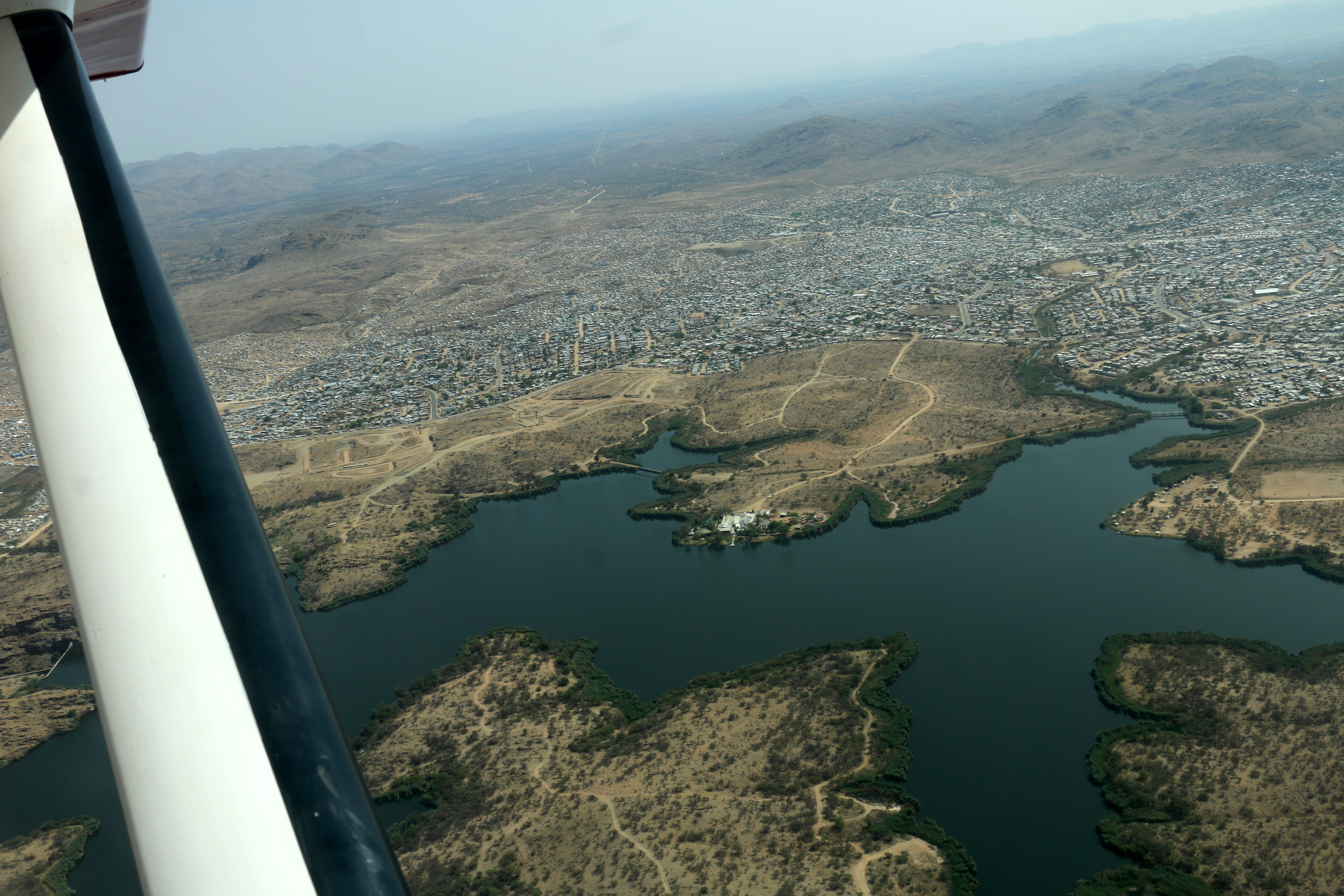
Goreangab Dam
