= Windhoek =

Capital and largest city of Namibia

Windhoek ǀAi-ǁGams (Khoekhoe) Otjomuise (Otjiherero) Windhuk (German)
- Capital city
- City of Windhoek
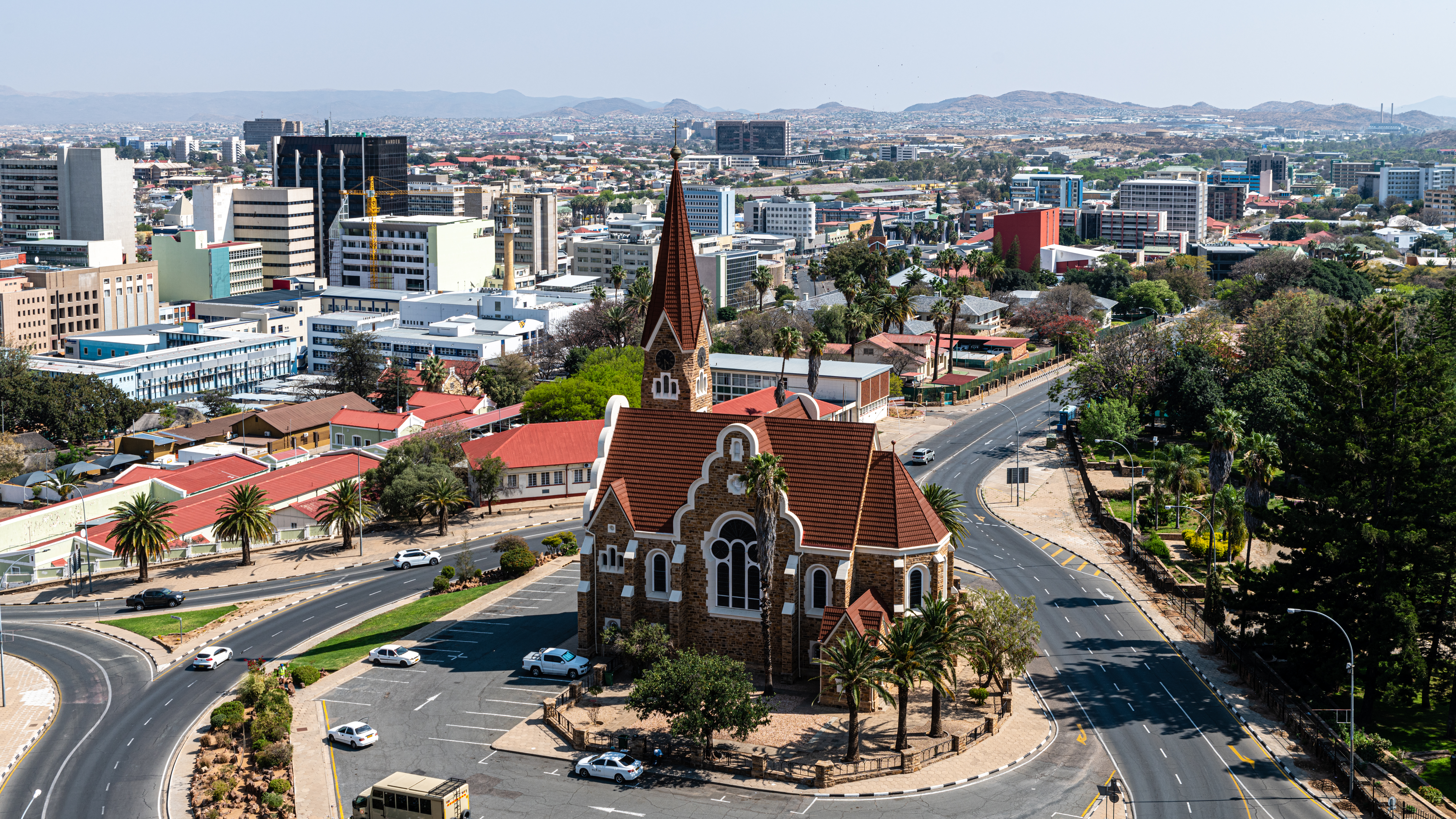
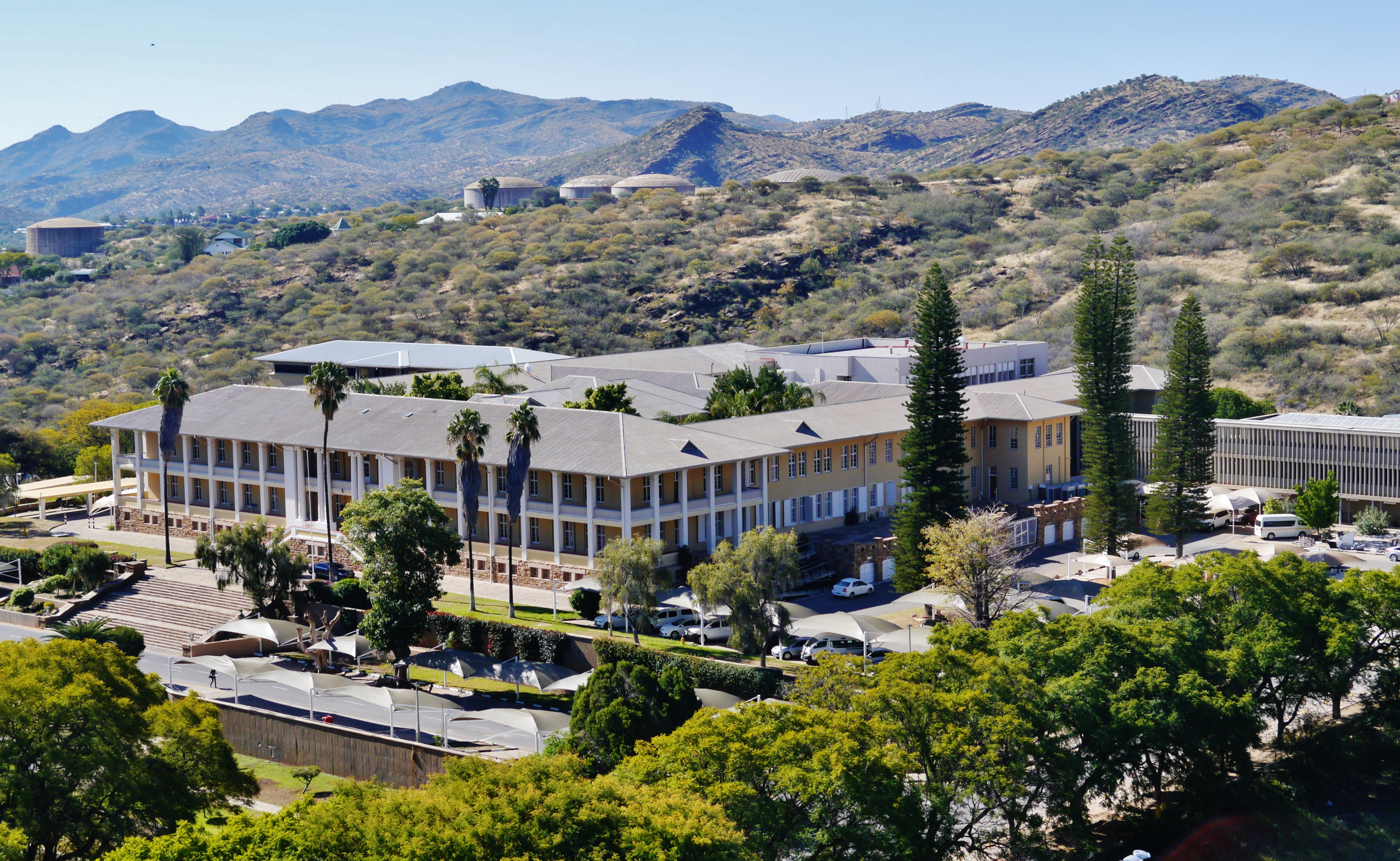
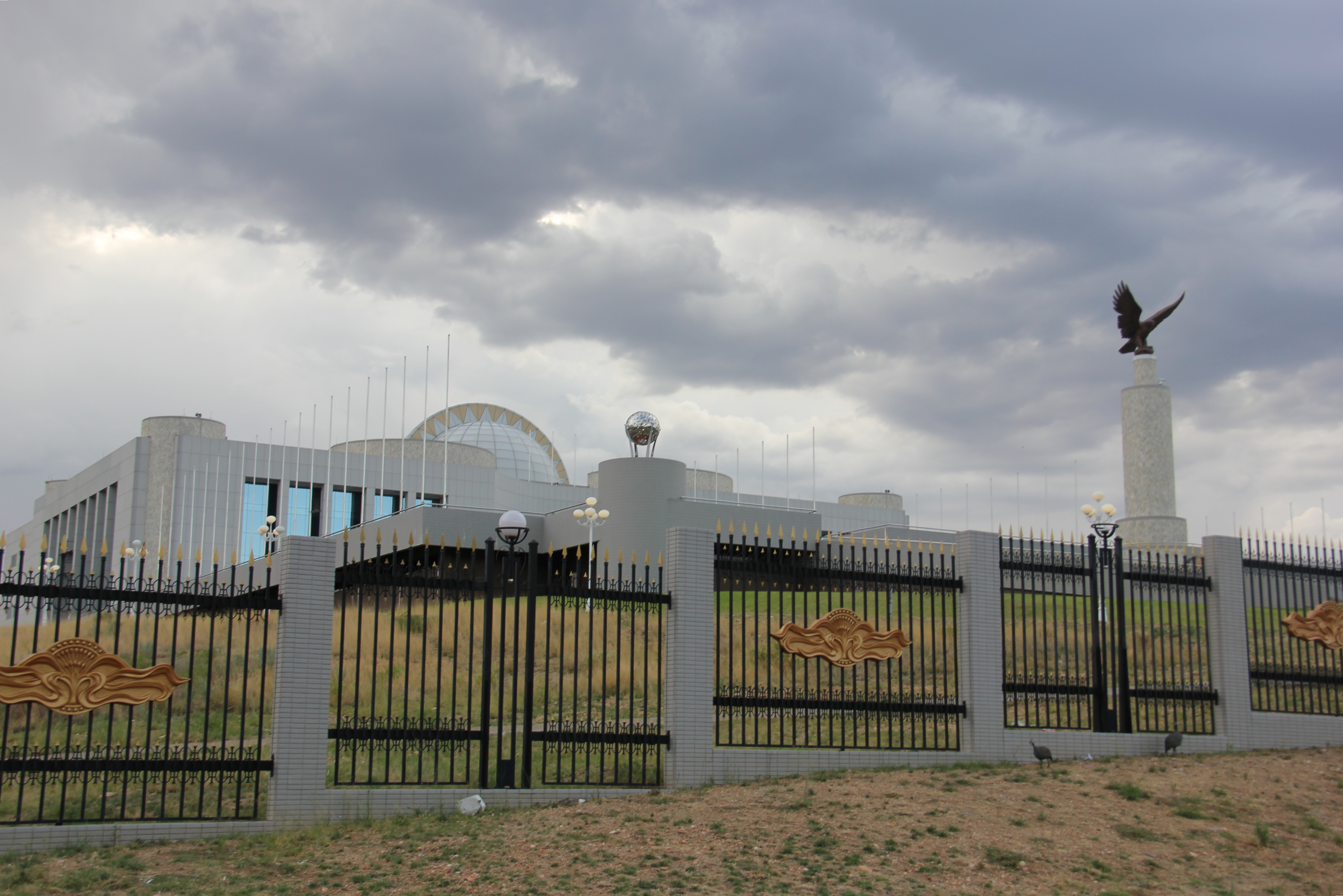
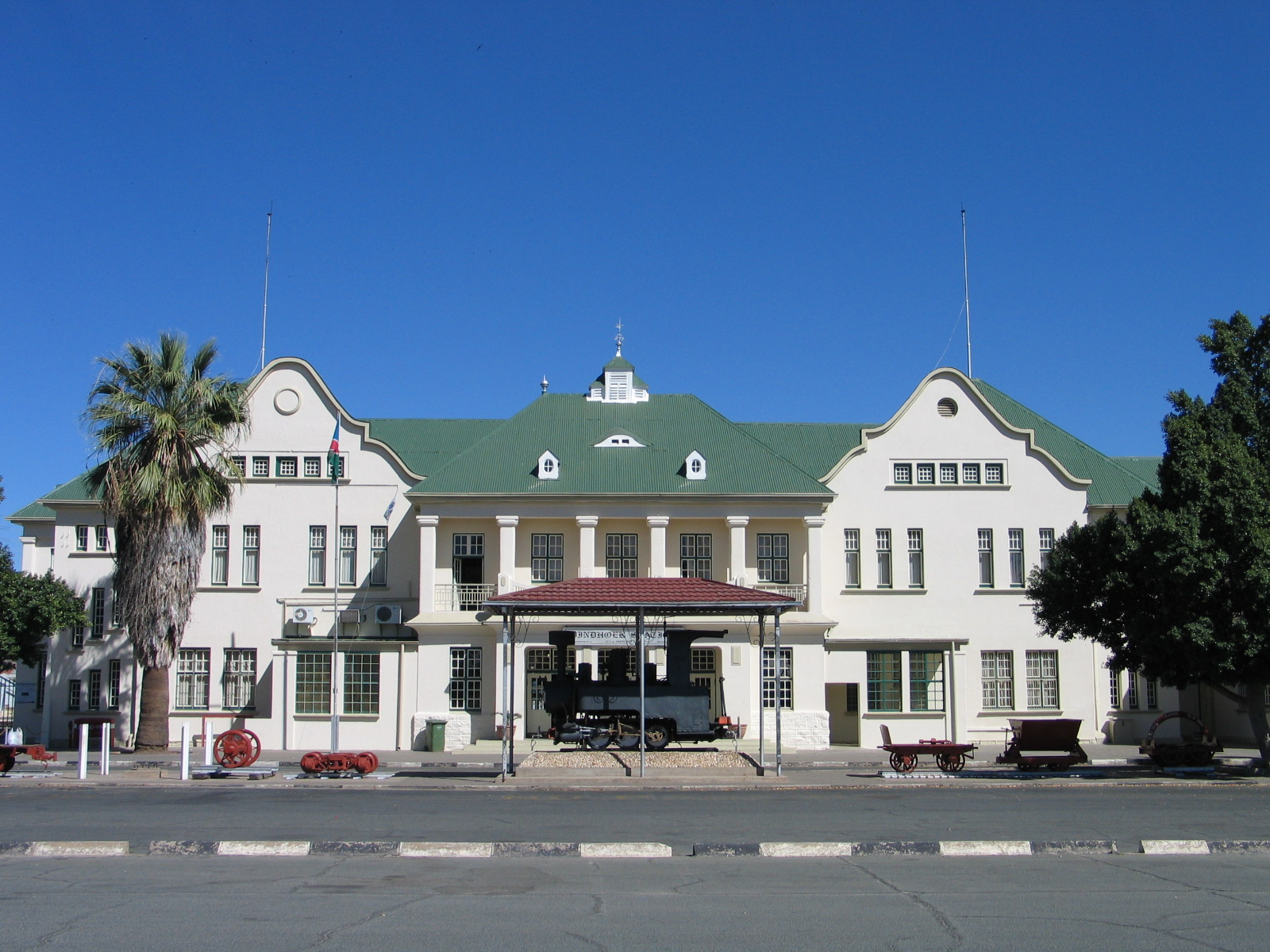
- Christ Church & Windhoek CBD Independence Memorial Museum Parliament Building State House Windhoek railway station

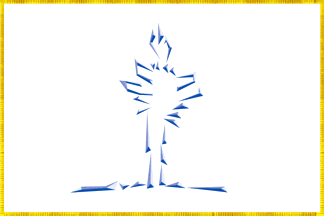
- Flag Coat of arms
- Motto: Suum Cuique (Latin for 'To each his own')
- Interactive map of Windhoek
- Location within Namibia Location within Africa
- Coordinates: 22°34′12″S 17°5′1″E
- Country: Namibia
- Region: Khomas Region
- First settled: 1840; 186 years ago
- Second founding: 18 October 1890; 136 years ago

Government
  - Type: Mayor-council government
  - Mayor: Ndeshihafela Larandja (IPC)
  - Deputy Mayor: Albertina Amutenya (SWAPO)

Area
  - Capital city: 5,133 km^{2} (1,982 sq mi)
- Elevation: 1,655 m (5,430 ft)

Population (2023 census)
  - Capital city: 486,186
  - Rank: 1st in Namibia
  - Density: 94.72/km^{2} (245.3/sq mi)
  - Urban: 409,758
  - Metro: 528,000
- Time zone: UTC+02:00 (CAT)
- Postal code: 10005
- Area code: 061
- Climate: BSh
- Website: windhoekcc.org.na

Windhoek (/ˈwɪndhʊk/; Afrikaans: [ˈvəntɦuk]; German: [ˈvɪnthʊk]) is the capital and largest city of Namibia. It is located in central Namibia on the Khomas Highland plateau area, at around 1,700 m (5,600 ft) above sea level in the geographical centre of the country. The population was 486,186 in 2023, and growing, due to migration from other regions in Namibia.

Windhoek is the economic, political, and cultural centre of the country where most Namibian enterprises, governmental bodies, educational and cultural institutions are located.

The city developed at the site of a hot spring known to the local pastoral tribes. It developed after Jonker Afrikaner, Captain of the Orlam, settled there in 1840 and built a stone church for his community. In the decades following, multiple wars and armed conflicts resulted in the neglect and destruction of the settlement. Windhoek was founded a second time in 1890 by Imperial German Army Major Curt von François, when the territory was colonised by the German Empire.

== History ==
=== Etymology ===
Theories vary on how the city got its modern name of Windhoek. Most believe it is derived from the Afrikaans words wind 'wind' and hoek 'corner'. Another theory suggests that Captain Jonker Afrikaner named Windhoek after the Winterhoek Mountains at Tulbagh in South Africa, where his ancestors had lived. The first known mention of the name Windhoek was in a letter from Jonker Afrikaner to Joseph Tindall, dated 12 August 1844.

=== Early settlement ===
In 1840 Jonker Afrikaner established an Orlam settlement at Windhoek. He and his followers stayed near one of the main hot springs, located in the present-day Klein Windhoek suburb. He built a stone church that held 500 people; it was also used as a school. Two Rhenish missionaries, Carl Hugo Hahn and Franz Heinrich Kleinschmidt, started working there in late 1842. Two years later they were driven out by two Methodist Wesleyans, Richard Haddy and Joseph Tindall. Gardens were laid out and for a while Windhoek prospered. A series of wars between the Nama and Herero tribes eventually destroyed the settlement. After a long absence, Hahn visited Windhoek again in 1873 and was dismayed to see that nothing remained of the town's former prosperity. In June 1885, a Swiss botanist found only jackals and starving guinea fowl amongst neglected fruit trees.

=== Colonial era ===
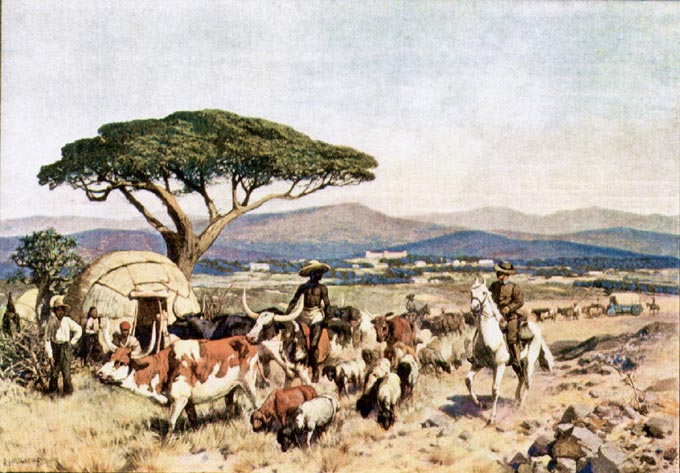
Windhoek before 1908

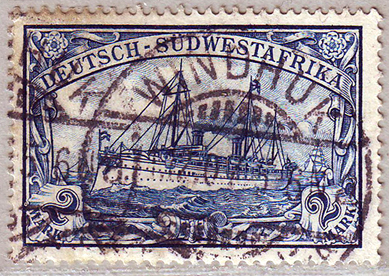
German South West Africa stamp postmarked Windhuk

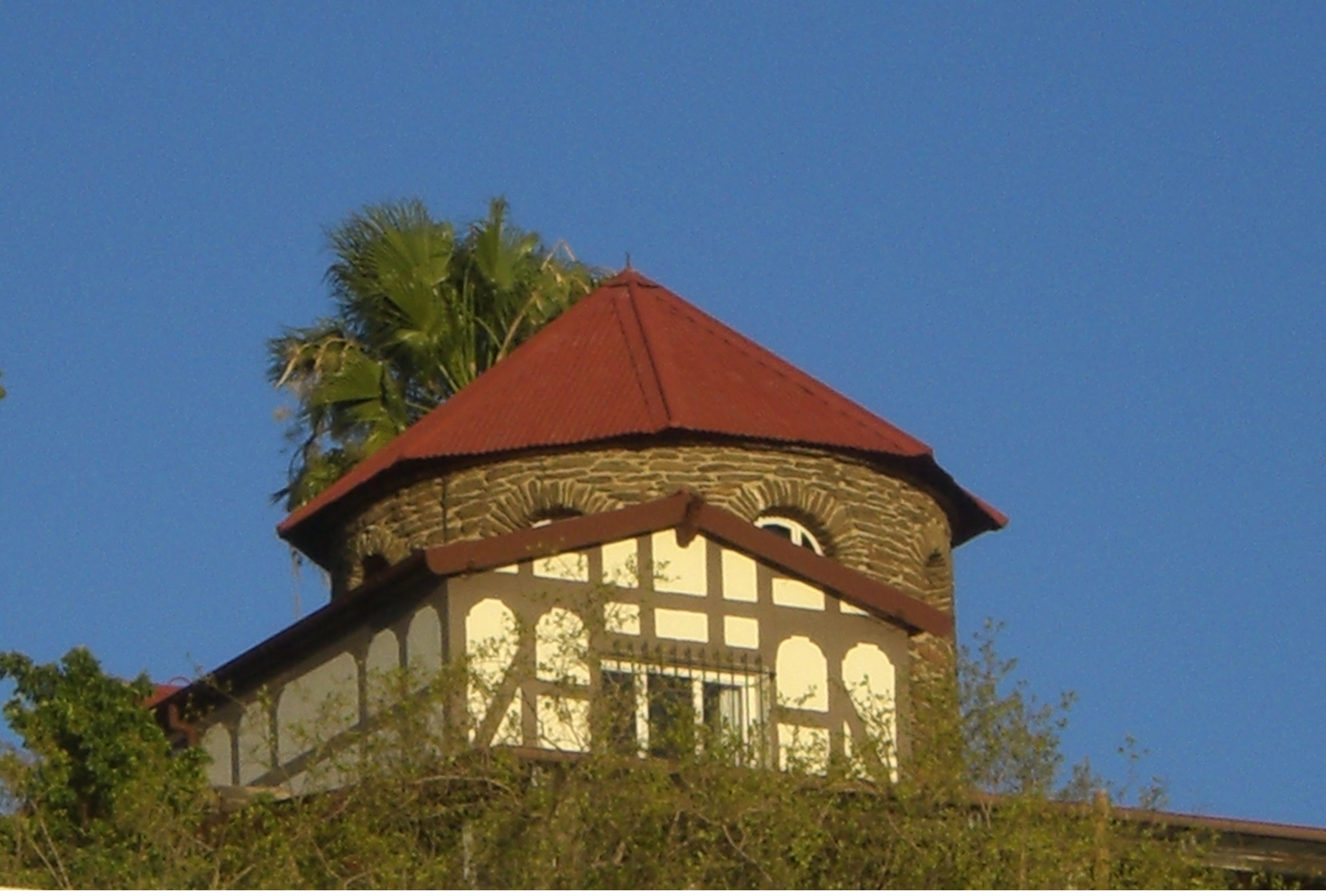
Sanderburg, one of the three castles of Windhoek

A request by merchants from Lüderitzbucht resulted in the declaration in 1884 of a German protectorate over what was called German South West Africa (Deutsch-Südwestafrika), now Namibia. The borders of the German colony were determined in 1890 and Germany sent a protective corps, the Schutztruppe under Major Curt von François, to maintain order. Von François stationed his garrison at Windhoek, which was strategically situated as a buffer between the warring Nama and Herero peoples. The twelve strong springs provided water for the cultivation of produce and grains.

Colonial Windhoek was founded on 18 October 1890, when von François fixed the foundation stone of the fort, which is now known as the Alte Feste (Old Fortress). After 1907, development accelerated as indigenous people migrated from the countryside to the growing town to seek work. More European settlers arrived from Germany and South Africa. Businesses were erected on Kaiser Street (presently Independence Avenue), and along the dominant mountain ridge over the city. At this time, Windhoek's three castles, Heinitzburg, Sanderburg, and Schwerinsburg, were built.

=== South African administration after World War I ===
The German colonial era ceased after the end of World War I; but South West Africa, and with it Windhoek, had already fallen in 1915. Until the end of the war, the city was administered by a South African military government, and there was no further development. In 1920, after the Treaty of Versailles, the territory was placed under a League of Nations Class C mandate and again administered by South Africa.

After World War II, more capital became available to improve the area's economy. After 1955, large public projects were undertaken, such as the building of new schools and hospitals, tarring of the city's roads (a project begun in 1928 with Kaiser Street), and the building of dams and pipelines to stabilise the water supply. The city introduced the world's first potable reuse facility in 1958, treating recycled sewage and sending the reclaimed water directly into the town's water supply. On 1 October 1966, the then Administrator of South West Africa granted Windhoek the coat of arms, which was registered on 2 October 1970 with the South African Bureau of Heraldry. Initially a stylized aloe was the principal emblem, but this was amended to a natural aloe (Aloe littoralis) on 15 September 1972. The coat of arms is blazoned (described) as "A Windhoek aloe with a raceme of three flowers on an island. Crest: A mural crown Or. Motto: SUUM CUIQUE (To each their own)".

Windhoek formally received its town privileges on 18 October 1965 on the occasion of the 75th anniversary of the second foundation of the town by von François.

In 1971, the Namibian general contract workers strike started from Windhoek with the goal of abolishing the contract labour system, opposing apartheid, and promoting Namibia's independence.

=== Since Namibian independence ===
Since independence in 1990, Windhoek has remained the national capital, as well as the provincial capital of the central Khomas Region. Since independence and the end of warfare, the city has had accelerated growth and development.

== Economy ==
The city is the administrative, commercial, and industrial centre of Namibia. A 1992/93 study estimated that Windhoek provides over half of Namibia's non-agricultural employment, with its national share of employment in utilities being 96%, in transport and communication 94%, finance and business services 82%. Due to its relative size Windhoek is, even more than many other national capital cities, the social, economic, and cultural centre of the country. The University of Namibia is based in the city, as well as nearly every national enterprise, including the country's only theatre, all ministry head offices, and all major media and financial entities. The governmental budget of the city of Windhoek nearly equals those of all other Namibian local authorities combined. Of the 3,300 US$-millionaires in Namibia, 1,400 live in Windhoek.

The Windhoek Correctional Facility is the largest of Namibia's seven major prisons.

== Transport ==
=== Road ===
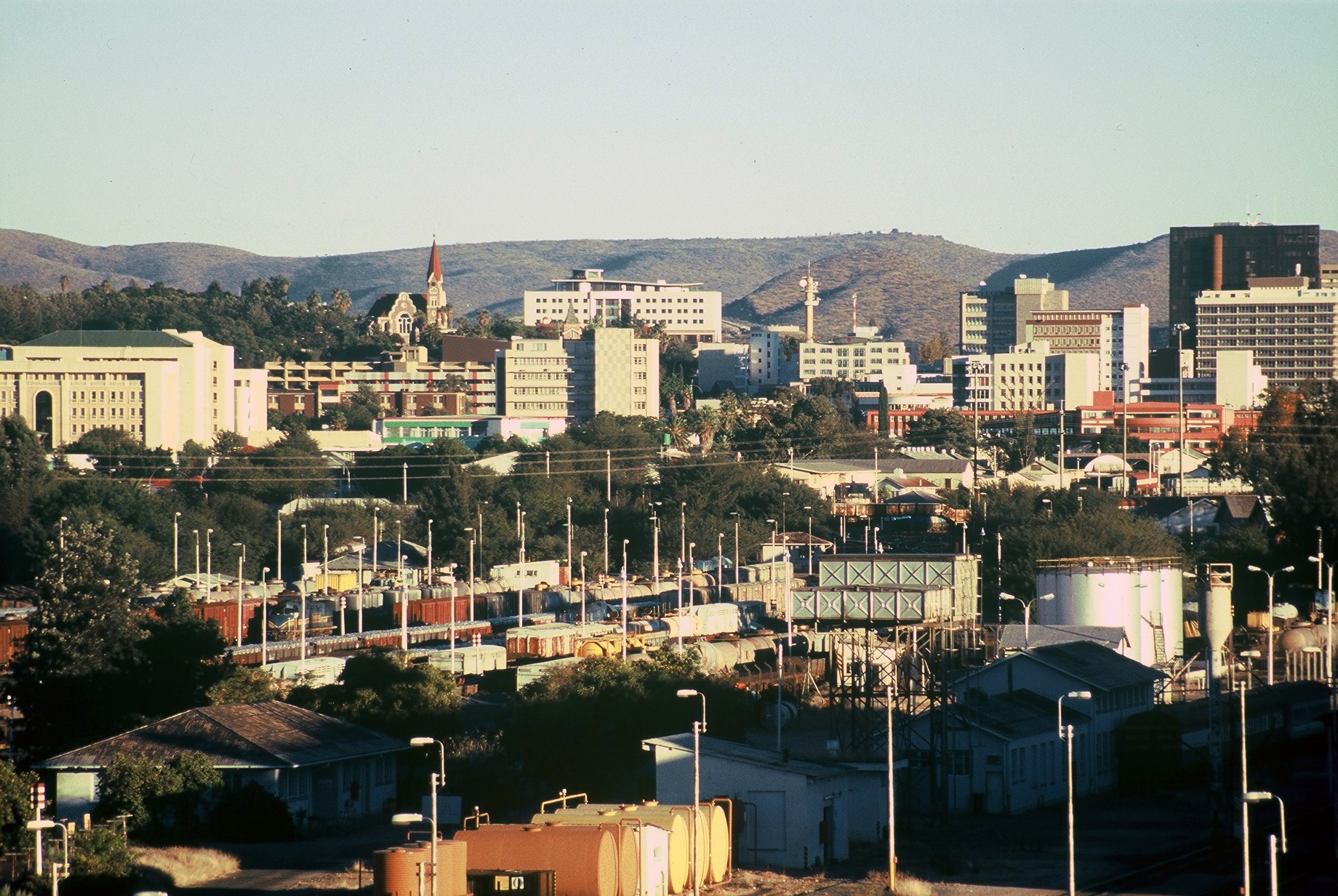
Windhoek skyline

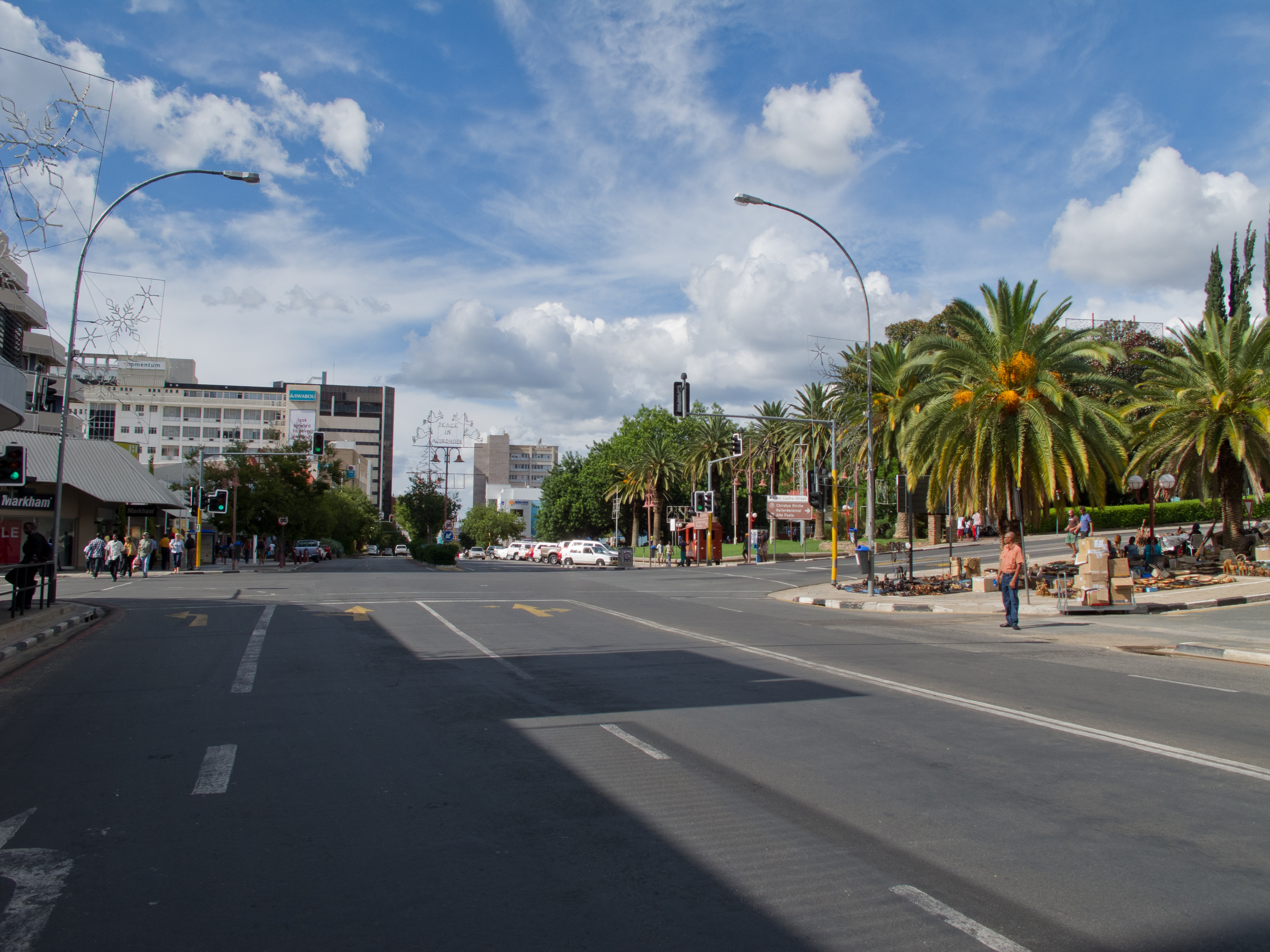
Independence Avenue

Windhoek's three main access roads from Rehoboth, Gobabis, and Okahandja are paved, and are designed to be able to withstand the largest possible flood to be expected in fifty years. Sealed roads can carry traffic moving at 120 km/h (75 mph) and should last for 20 years.

In 1928, Kaiserstraße, now Independence Avenue, was the first paved road in Windhoek. Ten years later the next one, Gobabis road, now Sam Nujoma Drive, was also paved. Today, out of approximately 40,000 km (25,000 mi) of Namibia's total road network, about 5,000 km (3,100 mi) is sealed.

In 2014, The Roads Authority planned to upgrade the Windhoek-Okahandja road to a dual carriageway. It would cost about N$1 billion and was expected to be completed in 2021. Later on, they also planned to upgrade the Windhoek and Hosea Kutako International Airport to a dual carriageway. This was expected to be completed in 2022.

As everywhere in Namibia, public transport is scarce and transportation across town is largely done by taxi; there were 6,492 registered taxis in 2013.

=== Air ===
Windhoek has two airports;

- Eros Airport, 7 km (4.3 mi) south of the city centre and used by smaller craft,
- Hosea Kutako International Airport, 42 km (26 mi) east of the city.

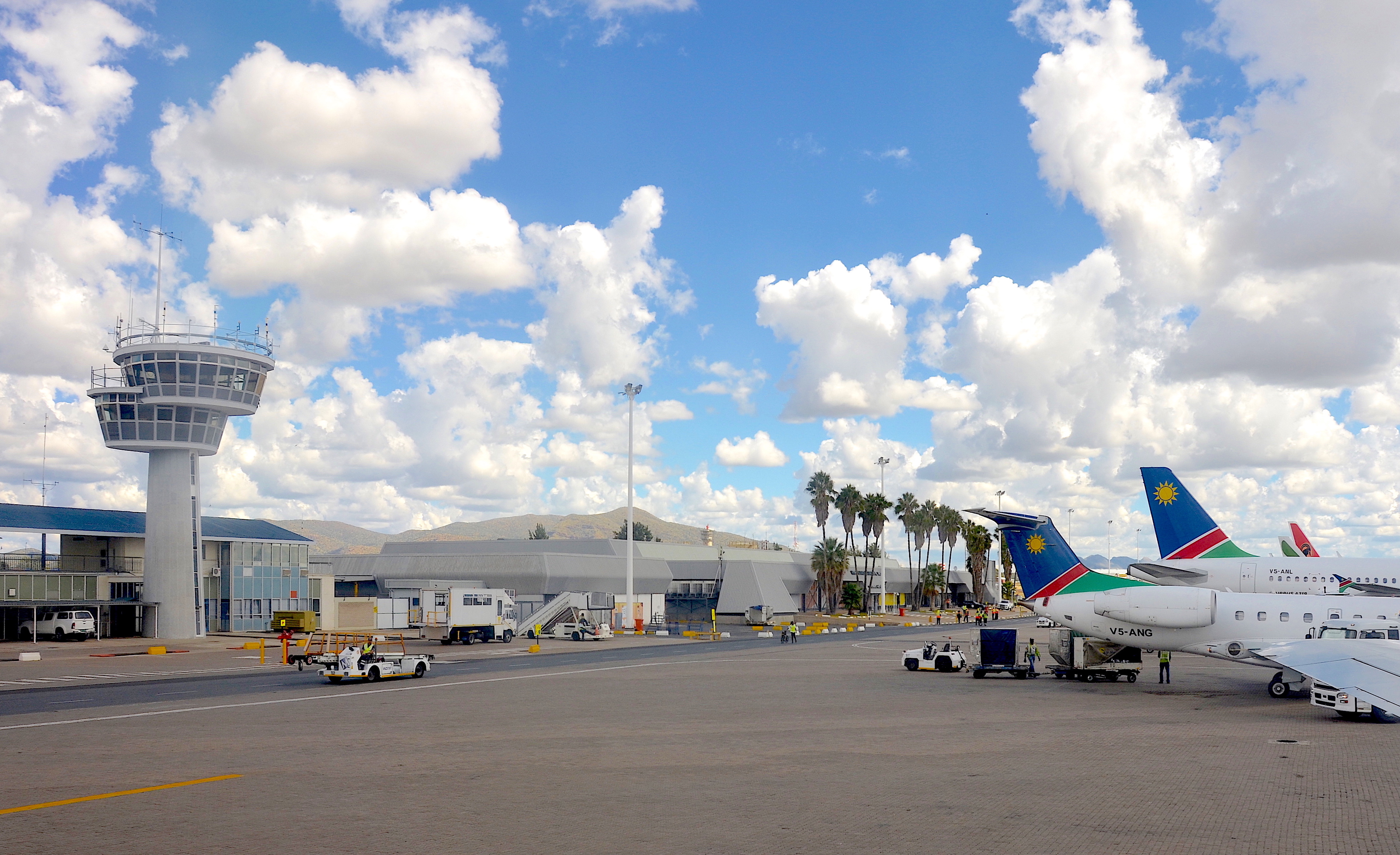
Airport with air traffic control tower (2017)

Hosea Kutako International Airport handles over 800,000 passengers a year. The other international airport is located in Walvis Bay, with domestic airports at Lüderitz, Oranjemund, and Ondangwa.

Eros Airport is the busiest airport in Namibia in terms of takeoffs and landings. This city airport handles approximately 150 to 200 movements per day, amounting to roughly 50,000 per year. In 2004, the airport served 141,605 passengers, the majority of whom travelled on light aircraft. Primarily, limitations such as runway length, noise, and air space congestion have kept Eros from developing into a larger airport. Most of Namibia's charter operators have Eros as their base.

=== Rail ===
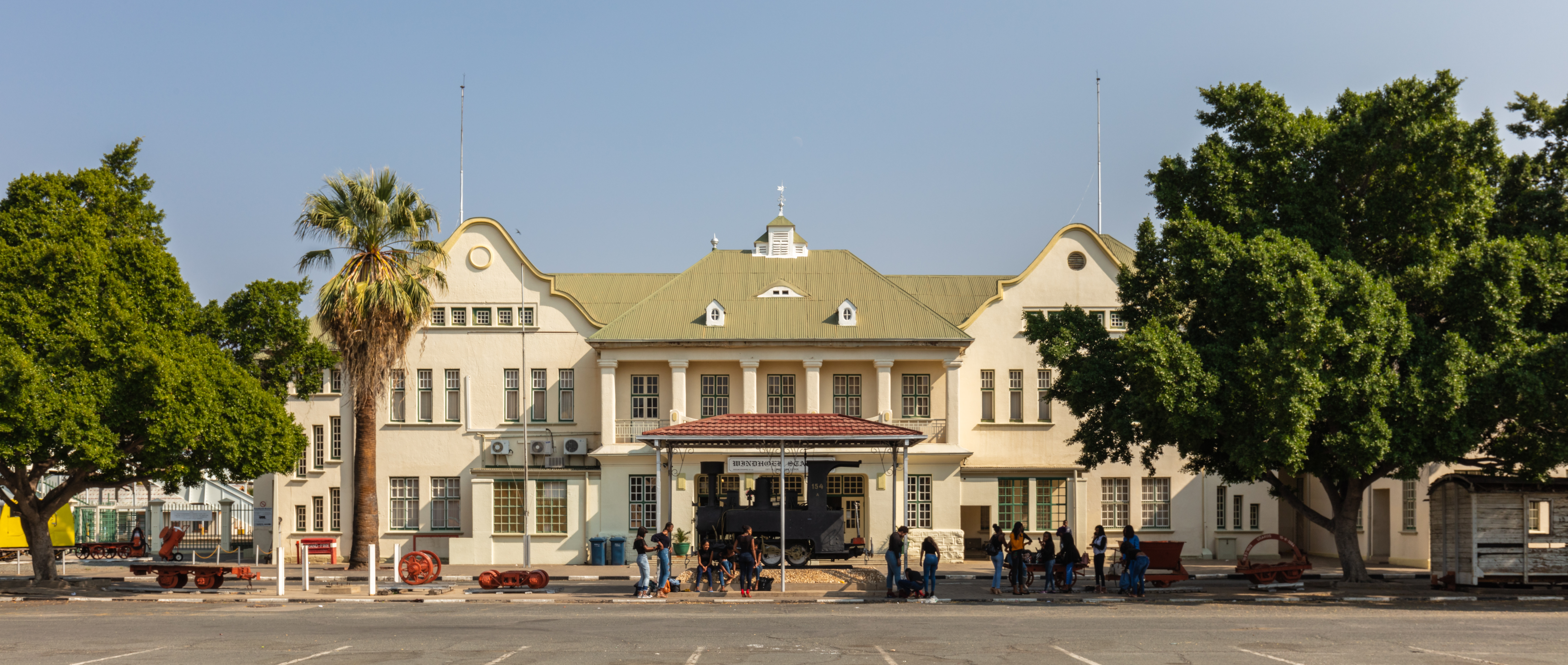
Windhoek Railway Station

Windhoek is connected by rail to:

- Okahandja (north)
- Rehoboth (south)
- Gobabis (east)

== Geography ==
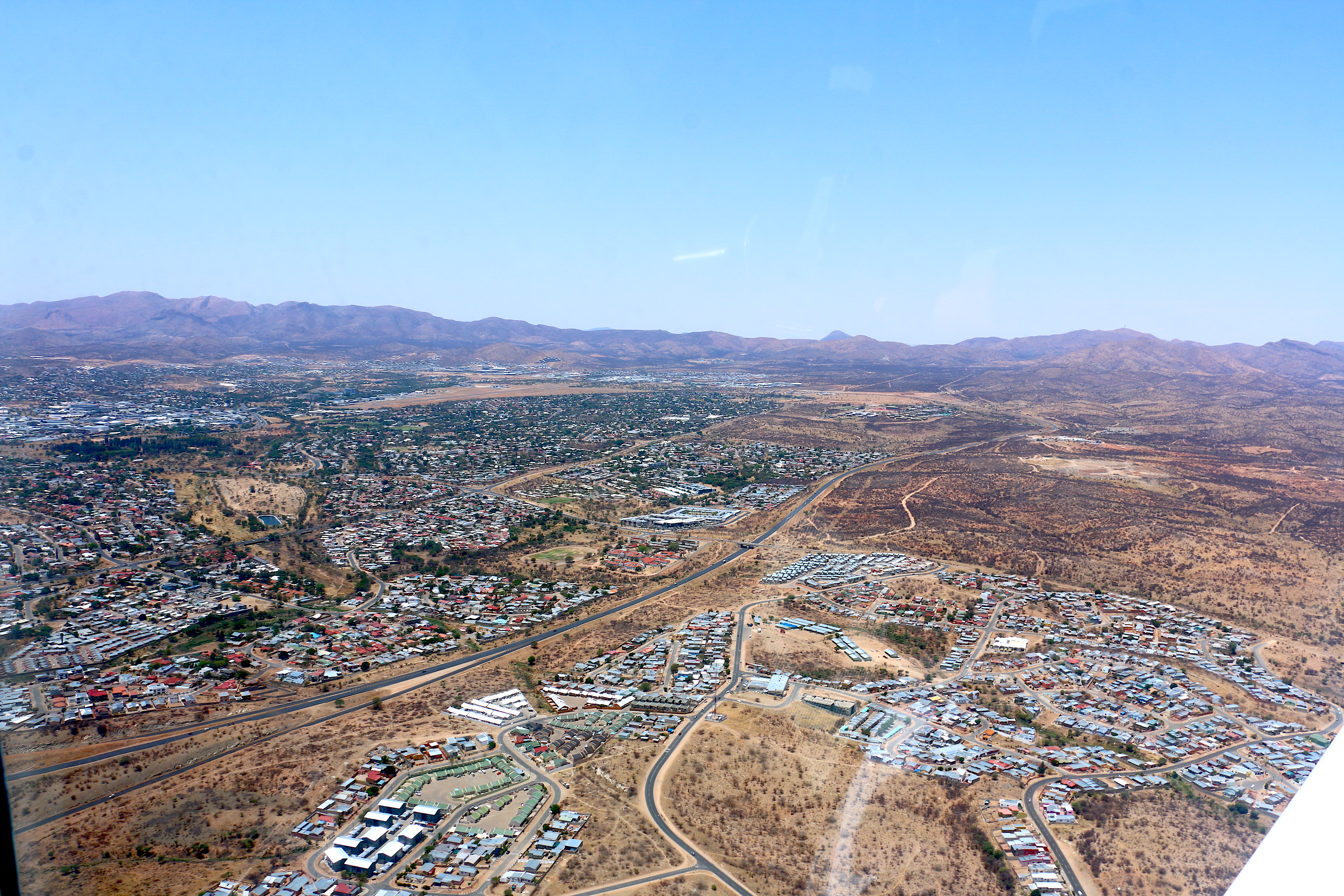
Auas Mountains

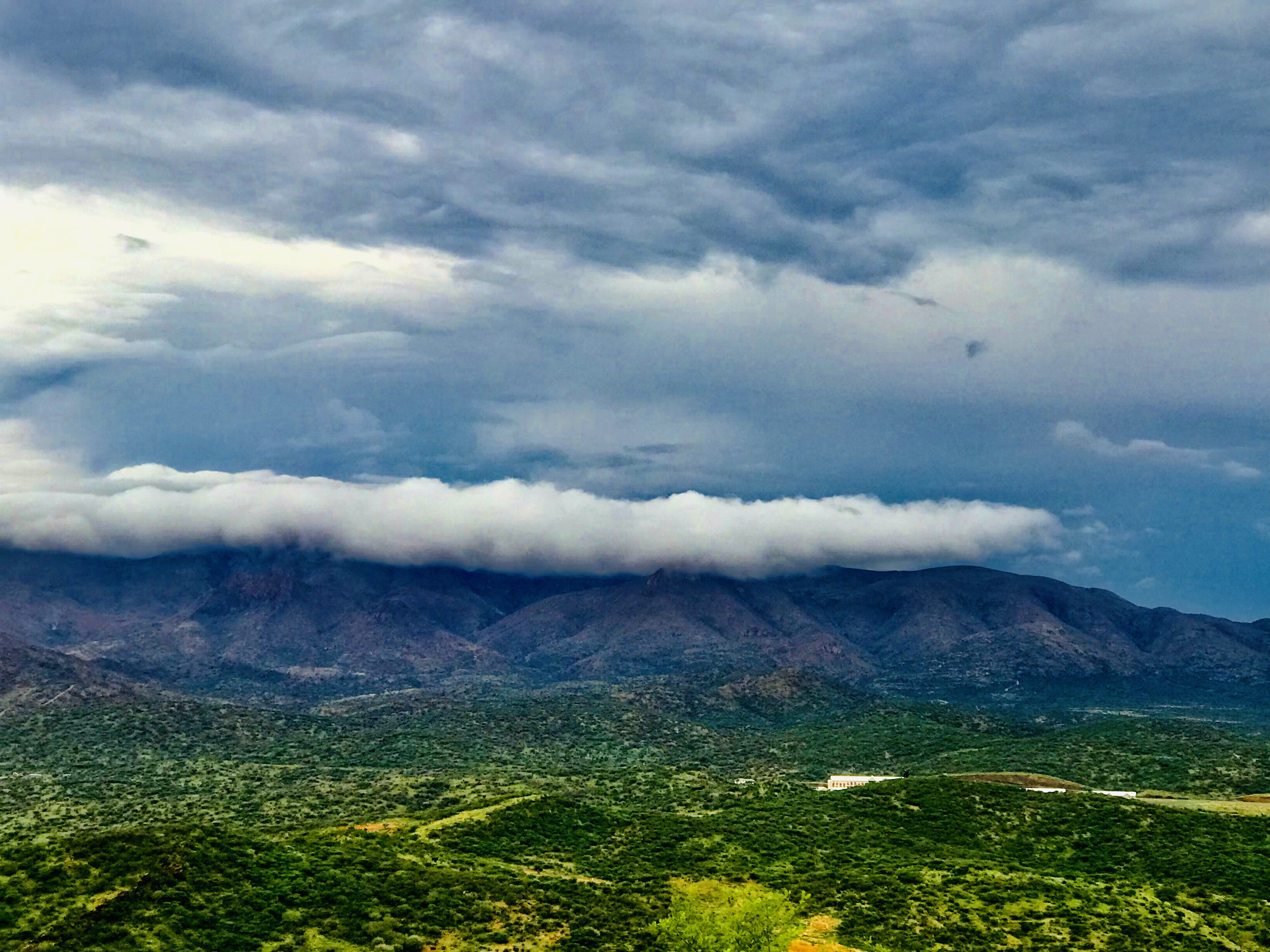
Rainy season

In southern, eastern and western directions, Windhoek is surrounded by rocky, mountainous areas, which make land development costly and challenging. Furthermore, the southern side is not suitable for industrial development because of the presence of underground aquifers. This leaves the vast Brakwater area north of town the only feasible place for Windhoek's expansion.

Windhoek's land area was dramatically expanded in 2011, when the Ministry of Regional and Local Government, Housing and Rural Development approved shifting the city's boundaries outwards by at least 50 km (31 mi) in each direction. The town lands now cover 5,133.4 km^{2} (1,982.0 sq mi), making Windhoek the largest city in Africa by land area, as well as the third-largest city in the world, after Tianjin and Istanbul. Its population density, though, is only 63 inhabitants per square kilometre.

The 2011 town land expansion also meant that Hosea Kutako International Airport and settlements relatively far away now belong to the capital, among them:

- Aris
- Baumgartsbrunn
- Brakwater
- Groot Aub
- Kapps Farm
- Mix camp
- Seeis

These settlements, previously under the administration of the Khomas Regional Council, have not immediately been incorporated into the administration of the City of Windhoek. Groot Aub for instance was only included in 2017.

=== Suburbs ===
Windhoek is subdivided into the following suburbs and townships:

==== Suburbs ====
- Academia
- Auasblick
- Avis
- Cimbebasia
- Dorado Park
- Elisenheim
- Eros
- Eros Park
- Goreangab
- Hakahana
- Hochland Park
- Katutura
- Khomasdal
- Kleine Kuppe
- Klein Windhoek
- Lafrenz Industrial Area
- Ludwigsdorf
- Luxury Hill (Luxushügel)
- Northern Industrial Area
- Okuryangava
- Olympia
- Otjomuise
- Pioneers Park
- Prosperita
- Rocky Crest
- Southern Industrial Area
- Suiderhof
- Tauben Glen
- Wanaheda
- Windhoek Central
- Windhoek North
- Windhoek West

==== Townships ====
- Babylon
- Big Bend
- Freedom Land
- Greenwell Matongo
- Havana
- Havana North
- Kilimanjaro
- Maxuilili
- Ombili
- One Nation
- Oohambo Dha Nehale
- Soweto

In many of Windhoek's townships residents live in shacks. In 2020 the city had a total of 41,900 of these informal housing structures, accommodating close to 100,000 inhabitants.

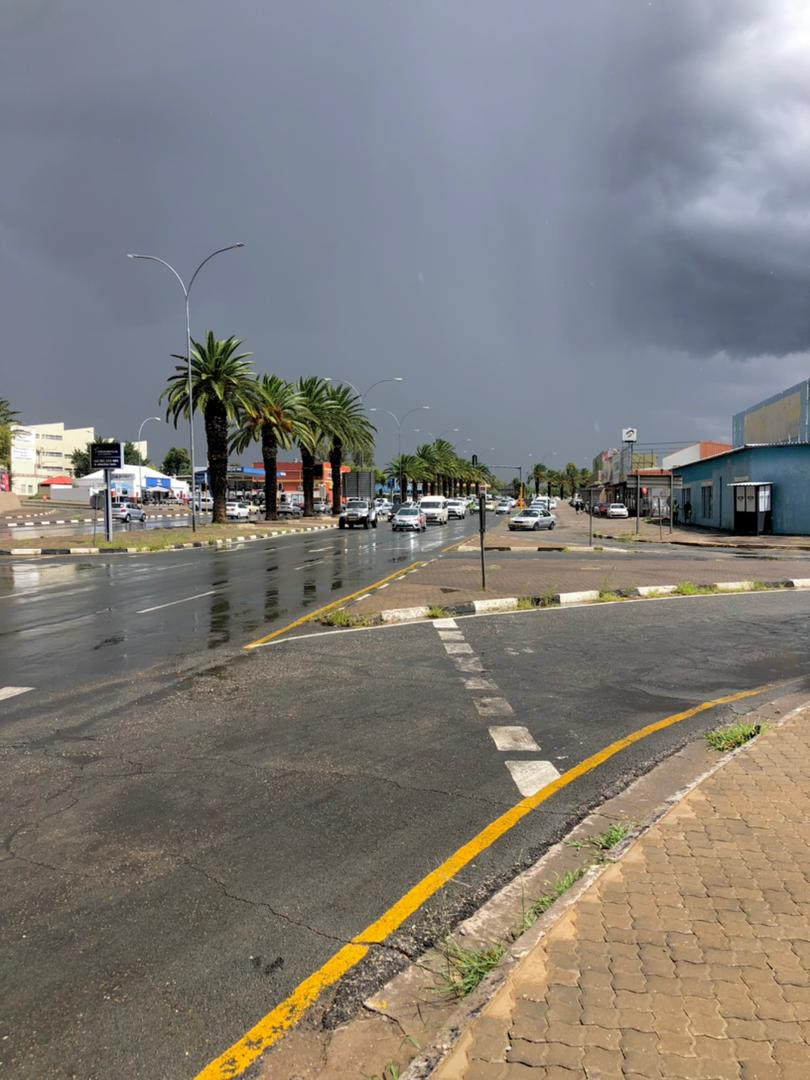
Overcast skies in Windhoek

=== Climate ===
Windhoek has over 300 sunny days per year. It experiences a hot semi-arid climate (BSh) according to Köppen climate classification as the annual average temperature is above 18 °C (64 °F). The temperature throughout the year would be called mild, due to altitude influence. The annual average high and low temperature range is 14.3 °C (25.7 °F). The coldest month is July, with an average temperature of 13.7 °C (56.7 °F), while the hottest month is December, with average temperature 24.1 °C (75.4 °F). Due to its location near the Kalahari Desert, the city receives 3,490 hours of sunshine. Precipitation is abundant during the summer season, and minimal during the winter season. The average annual precipitation is 377.8 mm (14.87 in), with lows of 106.7 mm (4.20 in) in the 2018/19 rainy season, and 97 mm (3.8 in) in 1929/30. The wettest month on average is February receiving 96.4 mm (3.80 in), while the driest is July averaging no measurable precipitation. The highest temperature ever recorded in Windhoek was 37.6 °C (99.7 °F) on February 2, 2013 and the record lowest of −3.2 °C (26.2 °F) on July 12, 1965.

Climate data for Windhoek (Eros Airport) 1991–2020 normals, extremes 1897–present
| Month | Jan | Feb | Mar | Apr | May | Jun | Jul | Aug | Sep | Oct | Nov | Dec | Year |
|---|---|---|---|---|---|---|---|---|---|---|---|---|---|
| Record high °C (°F) | 36.6 (97.9) | 35.8 (96.4) | 34.9 (94.8) | 32.5 (90.5) | 31.0 (87.8) | 27.6 (81.7) | 27.8 (82.0) | 31.4 (88.5) | 35.1 (95.2) | 36.4 (97.5) | 37.1 (98.8) | 37.6 (99.7) | 37.6 (99.7) |
| Mean daily maximum °C (°F) | 30.5 (86.9) | 29.1 (84.4) | 27.8 (82.0) | 26.2 (79.2) | 23.4 (74.1) | 21.0 (69.8) | 21.3 (70.3) | 24.2 (75.6) | 28.5 (83.3) | 30.4 (86.7) | 30.9 (87.6) | 31.3 (88.3) | 27.1 (80.8) |
| Daily mean °C (°F) | 23.8 (74.8) | 22.8 (73.0) | 21.6 (70.9) | 19.4 (66.9) | 16.5 (61.7) | 13.9 (57.0) | 13.7 (56.7) | 16.3 (61.3) | 20.6 (69.1) | 22.6 (72.7) | 23.3 (73.9) | 24.1 (75.4) | 19.9 (67.8) |
| Mean daily minimum °C (°F) | 17.2 (63.0) | 16.6 (61.9) | 15.4 (59.7) | 12.7 (54.9) | 9.6 (49.3) | 6.9 (44.4) | 6.2 (43.2) | 8.5 (47.3) | 12.7 (54.9) | 14.8 (58.6) | 15.7 (60.3) | 16.9 (62.4) | 12.8 (55.0) |
| Record low °C (°F) | 9.5 (49.1) | 10.1 (50.2) | 5.2 (41.4) | 2.4 (36.3) | −1.5 (29.3) | −2.8 (27.0) | −3.2 (26.2) | −1.7 (28.9) | 1.0 (33.8) | 4.5 (40.1) | 6.1 (43.0) | 8.3 (46.9) | −3.2 (26.2) |
| Average precipitation mm (inches) | 91.3 (3.59) | 96.4 (3.80) | 79.3 (3.12) | 19.4 (0.76) | 3.1 (0.12) | 0.5 (0.02) | 0.0 (0.0) | 0.3 (0.01) | 2.1 (0.08) | 11.4 (0.45) | 26.8 (1.06) | 47.2 (1.86) | 377.8 (14.87) |
| Average precipitation days (≥ 0.1 mm) | 10.5 | 11.2 | 8.8 | 3.1 | 0.5 | 0.1 | 0.0 | 0.2 | 0.6 | 2.4 | 5.1 | 7.0 | 49.5 |
| Average relative humidity (%) | 46.5 | 53 | 52 | 43.5 | 34 | 33 | 29 | 24 | 21 | 24.5 | 31 | 37.5 | 35.8 |
| Mean monthly sunshine hours | 282.1 | 243.0 | 269.7 | 279.0 | 313.1 | 297.0 | 310.0 | 319.3 | 297.0 | 303.8 | 288.0 | 288.3 | 3,490.3 |
| Percentage possible sunshine | 70 | 67 | 74 | 83 | 89 | 91 | 92 | 91 | 88 | 81 | 76 | 72 | 80 |
Source 1: Deutscher Wetterdienst; Danish Meteorological Institute (sun only)
Source 2: Namibia Meteorological Service / World Meteorological Organization; Climate Data

=== Demographics ===
At the start of World War I in 1915, Windhoek had 13,000 inhabitants, 3,000 of which were white. In 1971, there were roughly 26,000 white people living in Windhoek, outnumbering the black population of 24,000. About one third of white residents at the time, at least 9,000 individuals, were German speakers.

In 2010 the population stood at over 325,858 (65% black; 18% other; 17% white), and has been growing 4% annually in part due to informal settlements that have even higher growth rates of nearly 10% a year.

Historical population
| Year | Pop. | ±% p.a. |
|---|---|---|
| 1915 | 13,000 | — |
| 1971 | 50,000 | +2.43% |
| 1981 | 96,057 | +6.75% |
| 1991 | 147,056 | +4.35% |
| 2001 | 233,529 | +4.73% |
| 2011 | 325,858 | +3.39% |
| 2016 | 395,000 | +3.92% |
| 2023 | 486,186 | +3.01% |

In public life, Afrikaans, and to a lesser extent German, are still used as lingua francas even though the government only uses English.

== Politics ==
=== Local authority elections ===
Windhoek is the only self-governed settlement in Khomas Region. It is governed by a multi-party municipal council that has fifteen seats. The council meets monthly; its decisions are taken collectively.

SWAPO won the 2015 local authority election and gained twelve seats, by having 37,533 votes. Three opposition parties gained one seat each: The Popular Democratic Movement (PDM), formerly DTA, with 4,171 votes, the National Unity Democratic Organisation (NUDO) with 1,453 votes, and the Rally for Democracy and Progress (RDP) with 1,422 votes. SWAPO also won the 2020 local authority election but lost the majority control over the town council. It obtained 20,250 votes and gained five seats. The Independent Patriots for Change (IPC), an opposition party formed in August 2020, obtained 14,028 votes and gained four seats. Two seats each went to the local branch of the Affirmative Repositioning movement (8,501 votes) and the Landless People's Movement (LPM, a new party registered in 2018, 7,365 votes). PDM (5,411 votes) and NUDO (1,455 votes) obtained one seat each.

=== Twin towns – sister cities ===
Windhoek is twinned with:

- Addis Ababa, Ethiopia
- Berlin, Germany
- Havana, Cuba
- Johannesburg, South Africa
- Kingston, Jamaica
- Nanjing, China
- Richmond, United States
- San Antonio, United States
- Shanghai, China
- Suzhou, China
- Trossingen, Germany

== Culture ==
Independence Memorial Museum (2018)

Windhoek is known as the art capital of Namibia. The National Art Gallery, National Theatre and the National Museum are all located here. Two locations are part of the National Museum, the Alte Feste (historical) showcases a range of colonial items such as wagons and domestic items, while the Owela Museum (scientific; named after Owela, a traditional game played with pebbles) contains displays of minerals, fossils and meteorites and gives an insight into traditional village life. There are also the Independence Memorial Museum, the National Library of Namibia and the Windhoek Public Library, built in 1925, next to the Alte Feste. Other museums in Windhoek include the Windhoek City Museum, the Transnamib Museum, the WIKA (Windhoek Karneval) Museum, the Old Wheelers Museum, the National Earth Sciences Museum, and the Erfenis Kultuursentrum.

=== Places of worship ===
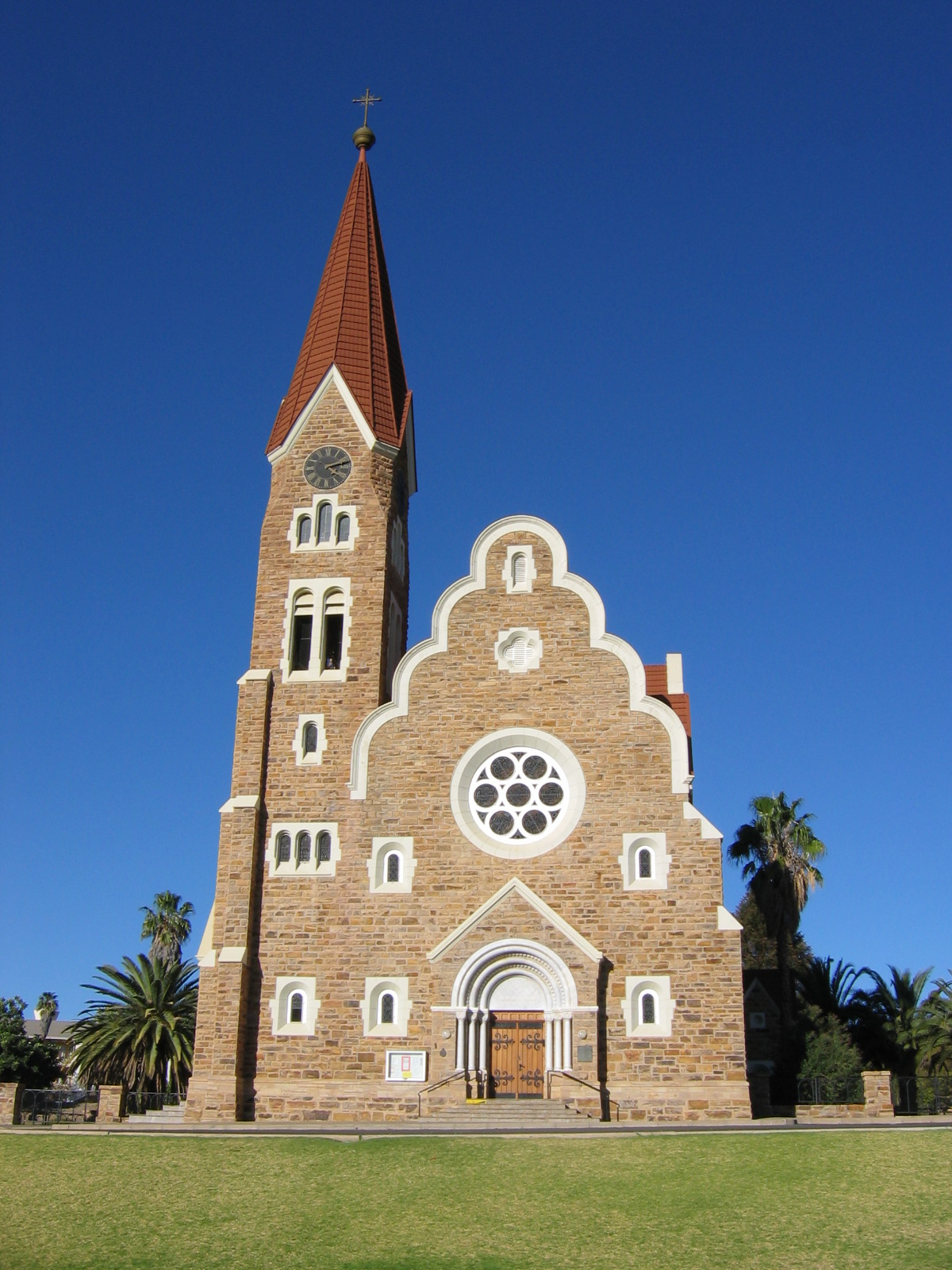
Christ Church, Windhoek

The places of worship are predominantly Christian churches and temples: those of Evangelical Lutheran Church in Namibia, Evangelical Lutheran Church in the Republic of Namibia, German-speaking Evangelical Lutheran Church in Namibia (all three members of the Lutheran World Federation), Baptist Convention of Namibia (Baptist World Alliance), Assemblies of God, Roman Catholic Archdiocese of Windhoek (Catholic Church). There are also a few Islamic mosques in the city, including the Windhoek Islamic Center.

=== Architecture ===
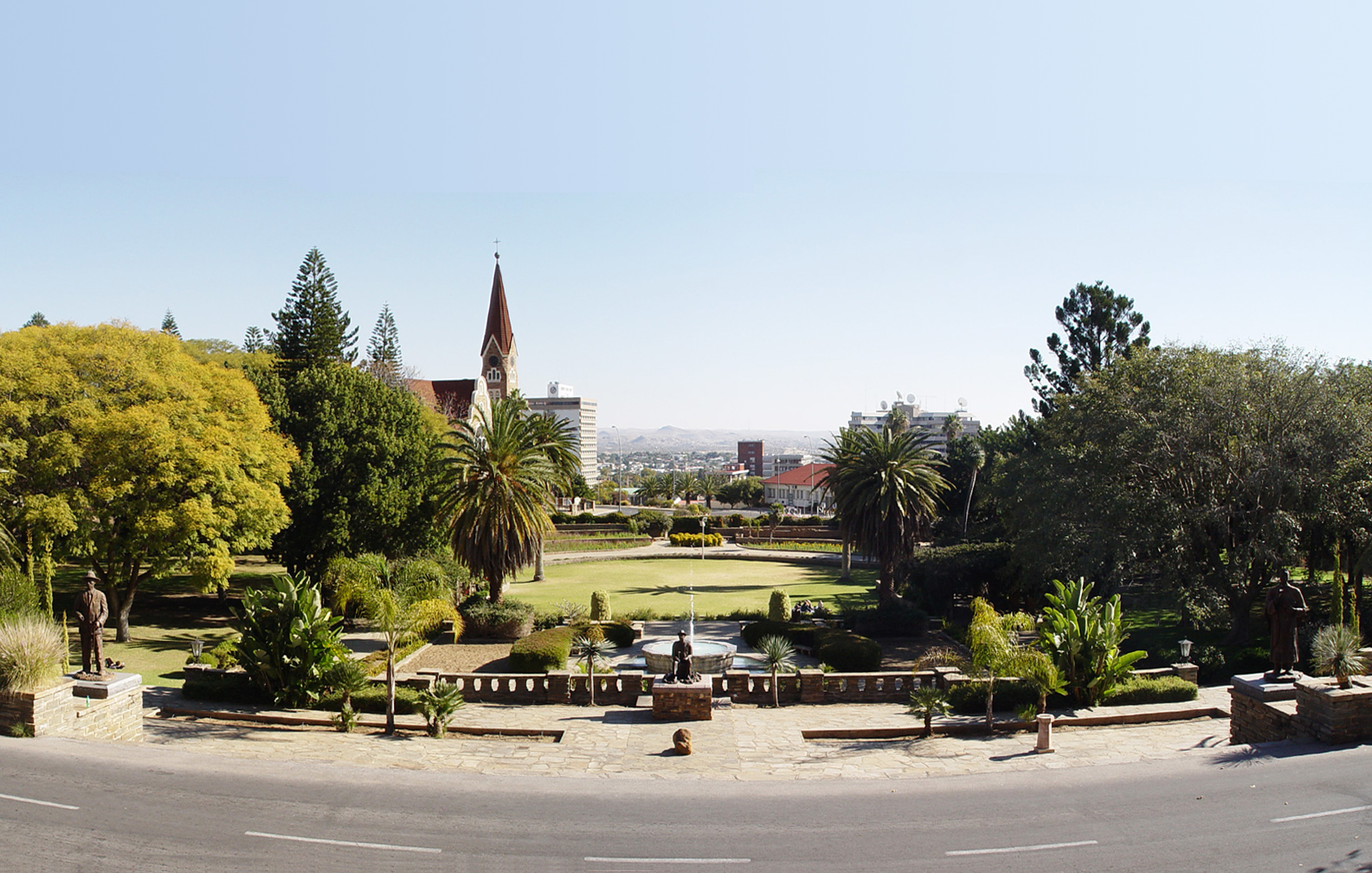
Parliament Gardens

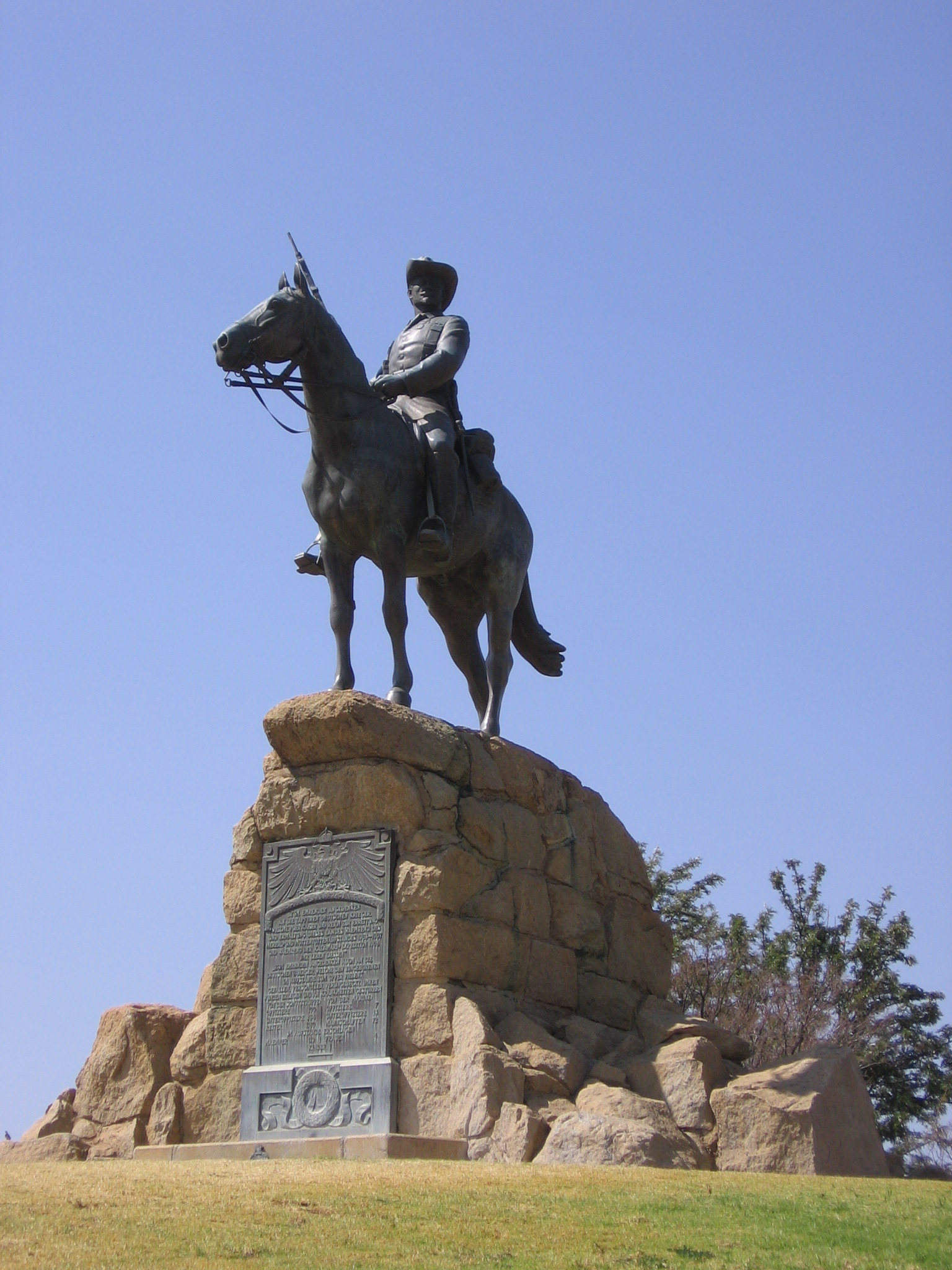
The Equestrian Monument

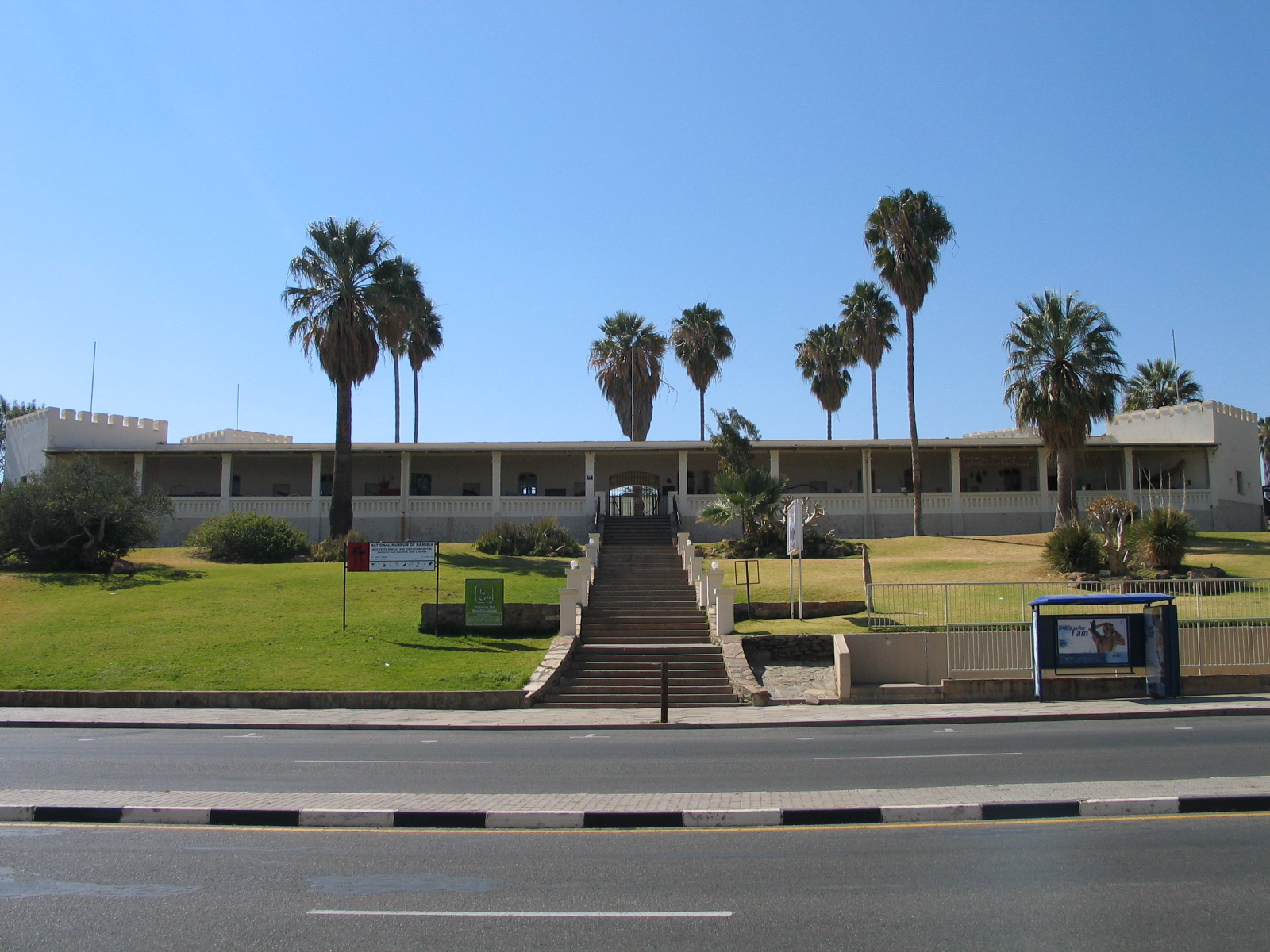
The Alte Feste

- Alte Feste – (Old Fortress) Built in 1890, today houses the National Museum.
- Curt von François monument in front of the municipality building. Inaugurated on 18 October 1965 on the occasion of the 75th anniversary of the second foundation of the town by von François. The statue was removed from its location, in front of the municipal grounds, on the 23 November 2022 and will be stored in the local Windhoek City Museum.
- Heroes' Acre – A national war and heroes memorial, about 10 km outside of the city.
- Independence Memorial Museum (Namibia) – A historical museum focusing on the anti-colonial resistance and the national liberation movement of the Republic of Namibia.
- National Council (Namibia) – The upper chamber of Namibia's bicameral Parliament.
- Reiterdenkmal (Equestrian Monument), a statue commemorating the German Empire's victory against the Herero and Nama during the Herero and Namaqua genocide of 1904–1907. The statue was removed from its historical place next to Christuskirche in December 2013 and is now on display in the yard of the Alte Feste.
- State House, Windhoek – The official residence of the President of Namibia.
- Supreme Court of Namibia – situated in Michael Scott Street on Eliakim Namundjebo Plaza. Built between 1994 and 1996 it is Windhoek's only building erected after independence in an African style of architecture.
- The three castles of Windhoek built by architect Wilhelm Sander: Heinitzburg, Sanderburg, and Schwerinsburg
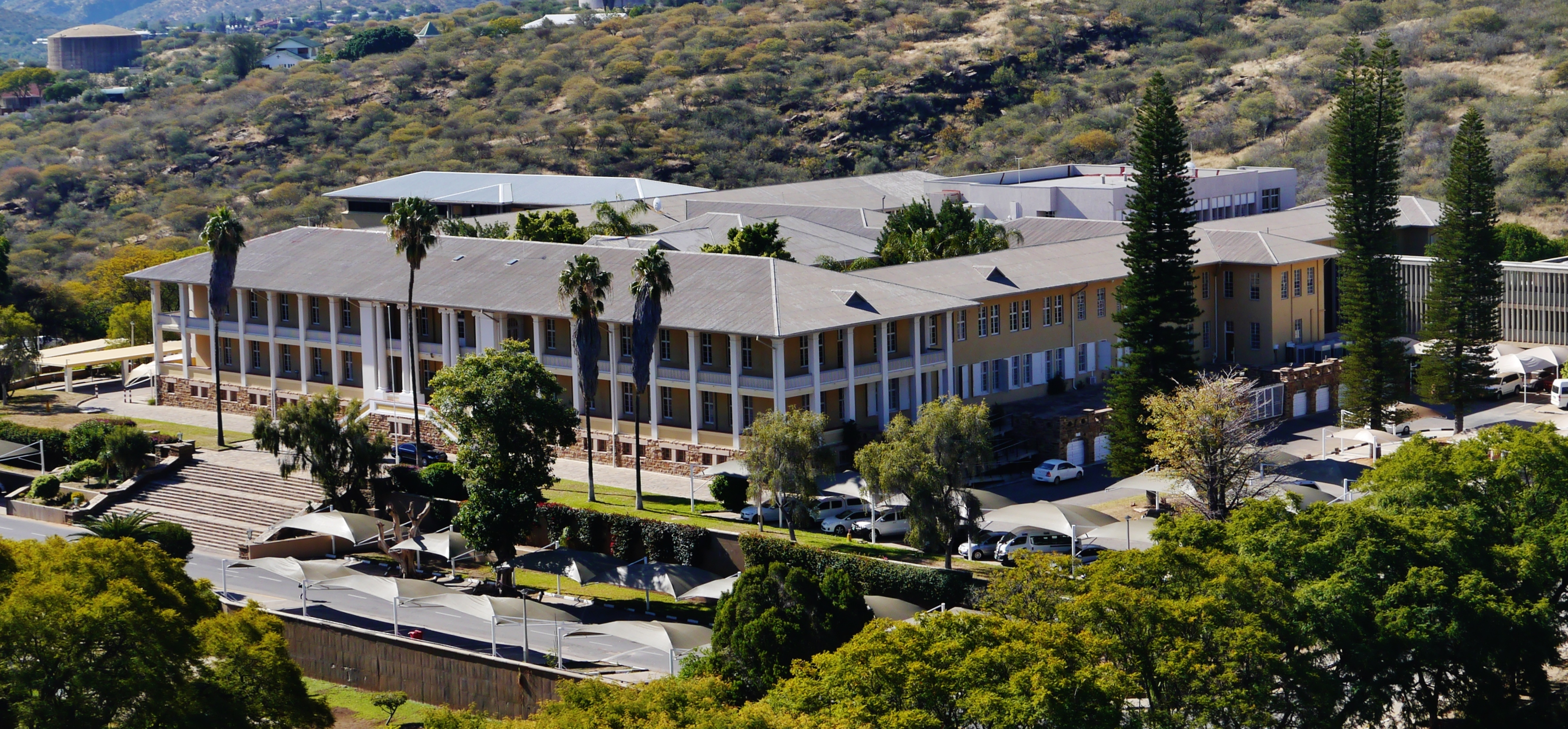
- The Tintenpalast
  Tintenpalast – (Ink Palace) within Parliament Gardens, the seat of both chambers of the Parliament of Namibia. Built between 1912 and 1913 and situated just north of Robert Mugabe Avenue.
- Turnhalle – neo-classicist building of Wilhelmine architecture, inaugurated in 1909.
- Windhoek Railway Station – A historical railway station serving the city of Windhoek.
- Zoo Park – a public park on Independence Avenue in downtown Windhoek. The current park is landscaped and features a pond, playground and open-air theatre.

== Recreation and sports ==
=== Sports ===
Rugby union is a popular sport in Namibia. The men's national team has qualified for the Rugby World Cup on seven consecutive occasions, in 1999, 2003, 2007, 2011, 2015, 2019, and 2023, but has not won a game at the tournament. The Welwitschias, who share their name with the national team, has competed in South Africa's domestic Rugby Challenge competition since 2021, and previously competed in the Currie Cup and Vodacom Cup.

The city has several football clubs, which include African Stars F.C., Black Africa F.C., F.C. Civics Windhoek, Orlando Pirates F.C., Ramblers F.C., SK Windhoek, Tigers F.C., Tura Magic F.C., and Citizens F.C.

Many boxers, such as Paulus Moses, Paulus Ambunda and Abmerk Shindjuu, are from the city.

The Namibia national cricket team, the Eagles, plays the majority of its home games at the Wanderers Cricket Ground. It has also played at other grounds in the city, including the United Ground and the Trans Namib Ground. The team took part in the 2003 Cricket World Cup in South Africa, though they lost all their games. They have played in each edition of the ICC Intercontinental Cup.

Men's baseball was introduced to Namibia in 1950 at the Ramblers sports club in town.

The Tony Rust Raceway is located west of Windhoek on the Daan Viljoen road and reopened in 2007.

=== Recreation ===
Farm Windhoek, located adjacent to the townlands and owned by the municipality, is a sports and recreational venue for hiking, running, and mountain biking.

== Education ==
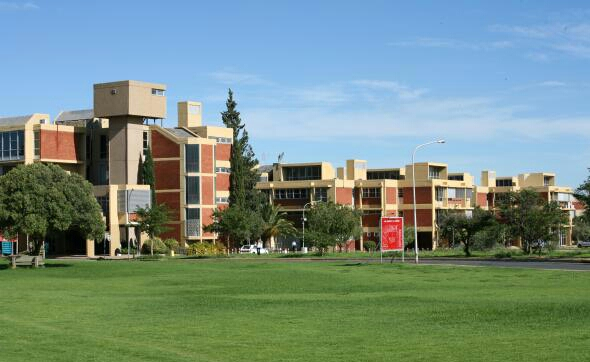
The main campus of the University of Namibia

=== Tertiary institutions ===
The general institutions of higher education in Windhoek are:

- University of Namibia (UNAM)
- Namibia University of Science and Technology (NUST); until 2015, the Polytechnic of Namibia
- International University of Management (IUM)
- Welwitchia University (WU)

=== Other institutions ===
Other recognisable institutions of higher learning:

- Institute of Information Technology (IIT)
- College of the Arts (COTA)

=== Secondary schools ===
Windhoek has 29 secondary schools and 58 primary schools. Some of the notable schools are:

- A. Shipena Secondary School
- Academia Secondary School
- Augustineum Secondary School
- Centaurus High School
- Concordia College
- Cosmos High School
- Chairman Mao Zedong High School
- Dagbreek School for the Intellectually Impaired
- David Bezuidenhout Secondary School
- Delta Secondary School Windhoek (DSSW)
- Deutsche Höhere Privatschule (DHPS)
- Ella du Plessis High School
- Eros School for Girls
- Hage Geingob High School
- Holy Cross Convent School
- Immanuel Shifidi Secondary School
- Jakob Marengo Secondary School
- Jan Jonker Afrikaner High School
- Jan Möhr Secondary School
- Saint George's Diocesan College
- Pionier Boys' School
- Saint Paul's College
- Windhoek Afrikaanse Privaatskool (WAP)
- Windhoek Gymnasium Private School (WHK Gym)
- Windhoek High School (WHS)
- Windhoek International School (WIS)

== Notable people ==
- Collin Benjamin (born 1978), retired footballer
- Jacques Burger (born 1983), former rugby player
- Tippi Degré (born 1990), documentary maker
- Dynamo Fredericks (born 1992), footballer
- Frank Fredericks (born 1967), athlete
- Gisvi (born 1982) Portuguese former footballer
- Stanley Goagoseb (born 1967), former footballer
- Morné Karg (born 1977), cricketer
- Max Katjijeko (born 1995) rugby union player for the Tel Aviv Heat
- Costa Khaiseb (born 1980), footballer
- Gert Lotter (born 1993), cricketer and rugby player
- Michelle McLean (born 1973), Miss Universe 1992
- Wessel Myburgh (born 1990), cricketer
- Maleagi Ngarizemo (born 1979), former footballer
- Bertus O'Callaghan (born 1988), rugby player
- Brumhilda Ochs (born 1992), model
- Quido (Le-Roy Quido Mohamed) (born 1989), rapper
- André Rademeyer (born 1998), rugby player
- Johnny Redelinghuys (born 1984), rugby player
- Francois van Rensburg (born 1974), rugby player
- Wolfgang Schenck (1913–2010), pilot
- Peter Shalulile (born 1993), footballer
- Abraham Shatimuene (born 1986), footballer
- Immanuel Shifidi (1929–1986), activist
- Abmerk Shindjuu (born 1981), boxer
- Colette Solomon, policy researcher and women's rights activist
- Nelius Theron (born 1997), rugby player

== See also ==
- List of mayors of Windhoek
- List of cemeteries in Windhoek
