= Josafat Shanghala =

Namibian bishop

Josafat Shanghala (Kashindi) (b. 8 June 1944 Nakayale, Outapi, Ombalantu, Namibia) is a bishop emeritus of the Evangelical Lutheran Church in Namibia.

== Biography ==
Shanghala is the son of Vendelinus Kautondokwa kaShanghala ShIipinge and Helvi yaSakeus yIiHuhwa. Pastor Sakeus Iihuhua was Shanghala's maternal grandfather.

Shanghala went to school in Nakayale during 1952–59 and in 1961, in Ongwediva during 1962–65 and in the Ongandjera Secondary School in 1976, completing Standard 10.

He studied theology in the Paulinum Theological Seminary, Otjimbingwe during 1970–73, and in Welgrspreit, Johannesburg, South Africa during 1972–73, where he earned a Diploma in Urban and Industrial Mission. During 1982–85 he studied in the Trinity Lutheran Seminary in Columbus, Ohio, earning a master's degree in theology.

Shanghala taught school in Oniipa in 1960, in Nakayale during 1966–67. He worked in the Owambo Radio in Oshakati in 1970.

Later he worked in Onesi during 1971–72, in Oranjemund in 1973, in Nakayale during 1974–77, in Oshakati during 1978–80.

He was ordained a pastor in Nakayale in 1973.

Shanghala was consecrated Bishop of the Western Diocese of the ELCIN in 2011, on the same day that Dr. Shekutaamba Nambala was consecrated bishop of the Eastern Diocese and Presiding Bishop of the ELCIN, by Presiding Bishop of ELCIN Dr. Tomas Shivute. Shanghala retired in 2014 and was succeeded by Dr. Veikko Munyika.

Shanghala was married to Ndamona yaDavid yaSimon yaHaidula in 1974, with whom he has two sons.

Preceded by Tomas Shivute	Second Bishop of the Evangelical Lutheran Church in Namibia; 2012–2014	Succeeded by Veikko Munyika
