= Johannes Sindano =

Chiwempe Johannes Sindano (born 1 January 1941) is a bishop emeritus of the Evangelical Lutheran Church in Namibia (ELCIN). He was born in Muye, Mexico, Angola.

Sindano is the son of Liwoyo yaSindano yaChiwempe and Nduuva yaNgonga. He went to school in Mupini during 1959–61 and in the boys’ school in Rupara in 1962, and then in the Rundu Secondary School during 1968–72. He received his theological training Lutheran Theological College in Mapumulo, Natal, South Africa during 1976–77 and in the Paulinum Theological Seminary, Windhoek, Namibia, during 1978–80, earning a diploma in the latter school. He was ordained a pastor in Ongwediva in 1981.

Sindano was consecrated as Bishop of the Eastern Diocese of the Evangelical Lutheran Church in Namibia (ELCIN) in 2004 at Nkarapamwe parish, Rundu, Kavango, by Presiding Bishop Dr Tomas Shivute of the ELCIN. He served as bishop until 2011, when he retired.

Preceded by Apollos Kaulinge	Second Bishop of the Evangelical Lutheran Church in Namibia; 2004–2011	Succeeded by Shekutaamba Nambala
