= Veikko Munyika =

Namibian bishop

Veikko Ndelihongela Munyika (born 21 May 1953 in Omutwewondjaba, Omundaungilo, Oukwanyama, Namibia) is a bishop emeritus of the Evangelical Lutheran Church in Namibia.

Munyika is the son of David venombwe yaMunyika gwaShilongo shaMunyika and Olivia Munashimwe shaKatengela kaShatya shaMuhongo.

Munyika went to school in Ohauwanga during 1963–64, in Omundaungilo during 1965–67, 1970 and 1973, and in Okongo during 1972–73. He attended the Oshakati Secondary School during 1974–76.

Munyika studied theology in the Lutheran Theological College in Mapumulo, Natal, South Africa during 1977–80, and the University of South Africa during 1983–87, where he earned the degree of Bachelor of Theology, and in the University of Natal during 1992–1997, where he earned a doctoral degree.

Munyika was ordained a pastor in 1981. He was consecrated Bishop of the Western Diocese of the ELCIN in 2014 at Ongwediva, by Presiding Bishop Dr Shekutaamba Nambala of the ELCIN.

He was married to Lovisa Ndinelago yaFilippus yaShipahu in Oshigambo in 1979. They have three sons.

== Publications ==
Muynika has published the following works in the Oshikwanyama language.

- Enota ile Ondjala? (Eloc Press, 1983)
- Elilongekido lumuwiliki.
- Kalunga nomunhu (EPP, 1987)
- Eendombwedi daJehova (EPP 1989)
- Omapumhumu taa lilile oulipamwe (1991)
- Teelela etango nokanyika (Gamsberg, 1992)

Preceded by Josafat Shanghala	Second Bishop of the Evangelical Lutheran Church in Namibia; 2014–2021	Succeeded by
