= Kleopas Dumeni =

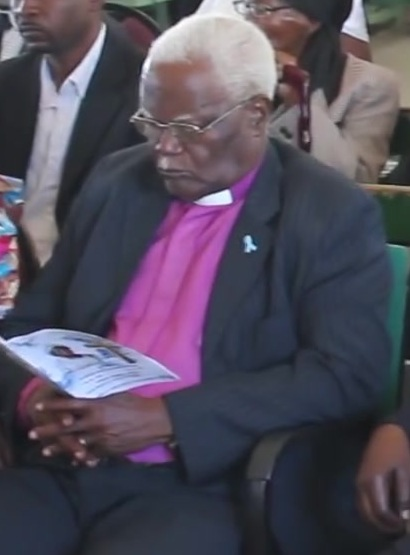
Image of Kleopas Dumeni

Kleopas Hafeni Dumeni (born 3 October 1930, Oshituku, Nakayale, Ombalantu, Namibia) is a Namibian church leader and a bishop emeritus of the Evangelical Lutheran Church in Namibia.

Dumeni is the son of Paulus Monima yaDumeni yaHipetekwa (b. 1902) and Hileni Utumbontsezi yaShimooshili shaUpuma (b. 1909).

Dumeni went to school in Oluvango from 1935–45, then in the Nakayale Primary School from 1947–50, in a vocational school in Oniipa from 1951–53, and a school in Oshigambo from 1955–56. He studied theology at the Elim Seminary during 1957–59.

Dumeni was consecrated a bishop by visiting Bishop Erkki Kansanaho from Tampere, Finland, in June 1979 at Ongwediva. Dumeni worked as the second bishop of the Evangelical Lutheran Church in Namibia from 1979–1991 and as the presiding bishop from 1992 until 2000 when he retired.

Dumeni has an honorary doctoral degree in theology from three universities:

- Wartburg Theological Seminary, USA, 1979
- University of Helsinki, Finland, 1990
- Gettysburg College, Pennsylvania, USA, 1991

He was also given the Wittenburg Award in 1991 by the Luther Institute, Washington, D.C.

Dumeni was married to Aino yaGabriel yaHaileka in 1959. He has 5 sons and two daughters with her.

Preceded by	Second Bishop of the Evangelical Lutheran Church in Namibia; 1979–1991	Succeeded by

Preceded by Leonard Auala	Presiding Bishop of the Evangelical Lutheran Church in Namibia; 1992–2000	Succeeded by Apollos Kaulinge
