= Tomas Shivute =

Namibian bishop

Tomas Iimbondi Shivute (b. 15 April 1942 Onayena, Ondonga, Namibia) is a bishop emeritus of the Evangelical Lutheran Church in Namibia. Shivute is the son of Sakaria Nehoya lyaShivute shaNdjongolo and Rauha Namunyela gweEgumbo.

== Education ==
He went to school in Oniinhwa during 1950–54, in Onayena during 1955–57, in Oniipa during 1958–59, and in the Ongwediva secondary school during 1960–63. Shivute studied theology in the Paulinum Theological Seminary in Otjimbingwe, Namibia, during 1965–68. He was ordained a pastor in 1968 in Nakayale. He pursued further studies in the University of Helsinki, Finland, during 1970–80, earning the degrees of Candidate of Theology, Master of Theology and Doctor of Theology, returning to Namibia after completing the last mentioned degree.

== Career ==
Shivute was consecrated the Bishop of the Western Diocese of the Evangelical Lutheran Church in Namibia (ELCIN) in 2000 at Ongwediva by Presiding Bishop Apollos Kaulinge of Evangelical Lutheran Church in Namibia (ELCIN). Shivute retired in 2011. He was the presiding bishop of the Evangelical Lutheran Church in Namibia in 2004–12, with his seat in Nakayale in the Omusati Region.

== Personal life ==
Shivute married Hilja yaFilemon ya Ndjendja in 1969. They have four daughters.

Preceded by Apollos Kaulinge	Second Bishop of the Evangelical Lutheran Church in Namibia; 2000–2004	Succeeded by Johannes Sindano

Preceded by Apollos Kaulinge	Presiding Bishop of the Evangelical Lutheran Church in Namibia; 2004–2012	Succeeded by Shekutaamba Nambala
