= Apollos Kaulinge =

Namibian bishop

Apollos Mhani Nghilifa Kaulinge (born 2 December 1934 Ondivandobe, Ondobe, Oukwanyama, Namibia) is a bishop emeritus of the Evangelical Lutheran Church in Namibia.

Kaulinge is the son of Vilho Mwadikange yaKaulinge and Marta gaNdeutapo. He went to school in Ondobe during 1940–50, in Engela boys’ school during 1951–52 and in Oniipa during 1953–54 and in Ongwediva in 1955, and in Ongwediva and Oshigambo high schools during 1958–59.

Kaulinge studied theology in the Elim seminary during 1960–62 and in the Lutheran Theological College in Mapumulo, Natal, South Africa, during 1963–65, where he earned a degree in 1965. He was ordained a pastor in Elim in 1962.

Kaulinge was consecrated a Bishop of Eastern Diocese of the Evangelical Lutheran Church in Namibia (ELCIN) on 26 May 1996 at Oniipa, by ELCIN Presiding Bishop Kleopas Dumeni, after Dumeni was installed the Presiding Bishop of the ELCIN on that same day. Kaulinge is the founder of Students Christian Movement (SCM) in ELCIN.

Kaulinge was married to Elina Eheneni yaJakob yaMwaningange yaNambandja in 1962. They have five sons and three daughters.

| Preceded by Kleopas Dumeni | Second Bishop of the Evangelical Lutheran Church in Namibia; 1996–2000 | Succeeded by Johannes Sindano |

| Preceded by Kleopas Dumeni | Presiding Bishop of the Evangelical Lutheran Church in Namibia; 2000–2004 | Succeeded by Tomas Shivute |
