= David Sheehama =

Namibian businessman and freedom fighter (1934–1980)

- Born: David Enghali Nehunga; 14 August 1933; Oshihenye ShaAnyanya, Outapi, Namibia
- Died: 14 March 1980 (aged 46); Nakayale, Omusati region
- Cause of death: Assassination by gunshot
- Burial place: Anamulenge Cemetery, Omusati region
- Spouse: Jakobina Taukondjele Anghuwo (m. 1959)

David Enghali Sheehama (14 August 1933 – 14 March 1980) was a prominent Namibian businessman and philanthropist. Owning several successful business enterprises in Namibia's northern Omusati region, he was considered a pioneer for trading businesses in the region.

== Early life ==
David Sheehama was born in on August 14, 1933, the second child of Mwaehamange Josef Nehunga and Mhingana Wilhelmina Shiweva in Oshihenye shAnyanya, a village less than a kilometer South of Ombalantu's northern town Outapi in Omusati Region. Educational opportunities were very limited during Namibia's colonial times. In the early 1940's, most young men from Kavango and the northern region left their homes to work as contract labourers on farms and industries in southern Namibia.

After securing employment as a household aide with a Van Zyl family in Windhoek, Sheehama swiftly garnered their confidence. He assumed responsibility for caring for their children and managing household affairs during their absences. During his tenure, Sheehama acquired proficiency in driving and sewing, eventually receiving a sewing machine as a token of recognition. He utilized his newfound skills to tailor bedding and attire for his employers, subsequently expanding his services to include crafting and vending bed linens and garments to his acquaintances. Capitalizing on opportunities, he established networks with migrant workers, dispatching his products to Oranjemund and Ombalantu for resale on commission.

== Marriage and children ==
In 1959, he married Jakobina Anghuwo after being romantically involved for several years. Jakobina came from a neighbouring homestead and is the daughter of Abraham Shipuka Anghuwo and Johanna Ndanyengwa Kalipi. The couple had ten children, five boys and five girls including Namibian Reggae musician, the late Ras Sheehama.

== Business career ==
Colonial Ovamboland saw trade become the locals' lifeline to the modern economy, offering an escape from the dependency of short-term labor contracts. Sheehama's business orientation grew while serving the Van Zyl family. By the mid-1950s, David Sheehama had accumulated enough savings to establish his first home in Onakayale, near Outapi in northern Namibia. He dedicated himself fully to his tailoring and clothing sales business around 1956, setting up a mobile stall selling various affordable goods after church services and weddings. Soon after marrying Jakobina, they opened a shop offering essential items like sugar, food, paraffin, blankets, and clothing. Jakobina, trained in sewing by David, made and sold dresses and baby slings, while also managing the shop. Notably, they sold Cuca Beer, popular in northern Namibia.

Before settling down, Sheehama purchased his own car, one of the first in the area. This vehicle aided in transporting and delivering goods to his shop. Recognizing the growth of migrant labor, he established the first public transport service in the area, ferrying workers from various towns to labor compounds. This venture proved highly profitable, leading him to expand his fleet of trucks. Migrant workers often camped at his shop while waiting for transport. Initially driving himself, Sheehama later recruited local youth as drivers, including Oswin Mukulu, who currently is the Chief of Ombalantu Traditional Authority.

However, the late 1960s saw a decline in his transportation business due to the railway extension to Ombalantu and Ruacana. Sheehama shifted his focus entirely to trading, using his accumulated capital to expand and open new shops. He established branches in Okalongo and, during the 1970s, acquired and gifted two BBK Wholesalers near Outapi to his family members. Additionally, he opened shops in Oshakati and Ongwediva, recognizing their potential as new market towns in the north. This decade witnessed significant growth for David Sheehama's trading enterprises, extending across northern Namibia.

Finally, he operated a bottle store near the Onakayale mission station, strategically located near a school, hospital, and Italian construction project for the Ruacana Hydroelectric Power Station, all contributing to its success.

== Political involvements ==
Sheehama was an avowed freedom fighter closely associated with his political home-ground party, the South West Africa's People Organization (SWAPO) party which prior to 1960 was then the Owambo People's Organization (OPO). Sheehama was in close association with the organization's military wing, the People's Liberation Army of Namibia (PLAN) founded in 1962 that for more than two decades fought against the South African Defence Force (SADF) to liberate Namibia from the brutalities of the apartheid regime.

With the profits of his busy supermarkets, Sheehama would fund SWAPO activities and holistically supported the PLAN combatants with clothing, food and hospitality in his own home. He on occasions voluntarily transported PLAN's armed caches from Angola to Namibia and became one of the few business persons known personally by combatants in Ombalantu.

As a man of great influence in the community, Sheehama was endlessly prodded to abdicate his patriotic obligations. He had been asked to join the colonial Bantustan and puppet government which consisted of informants and accomplices of the apartheid government, reporting on the works of the PLAN liberational unionization efforts to weaken and destabilize the Namibian War for Independence. After several failed attempts to lure him, in the early morning hours of 14 March 1980, while sleeping next to his pregnant wife and two-year-old daughter, he was assassinated (supposedly) by the Koevoet. He was shot several times with an AK - 47 automatic rifle, his wife and unborn child were left wounded but he was pronounced dead on the spot. His house and car was set on fire on that fateful night. Sheehama was ranked one of the richest black men in Namibia during the 1970s together with Frans Indongo, Eliakim Namundjembo and Thomas Nakambonde.
