= Sheehama =

Sheehama is a surname occurring in Namibia. Notable people with the surname include:

- David Sheehama (1934–1980), Namibian businessman and philanthropist
- Ras Sheehama (1966–2025), Namibian reggae musician, son of David
