= Benjamin Hauwanga =

Namibian businessman

Benjamin Hauwanga, commonly known as B.H., (born 24 September 1961 in Tsumeb, Oshikoto) is a Namibian businessman. His parents separated while he was a young boy; his mother single-handedly raised him, although his father visited the family regularly. He has eight siblings.

He was fascinated with business at a very young age; as a child he sold indigenous food after school to contribute to the household income while his mother worked as a domestic worker. As with every business, money is the key and the main objective: Whenever he got, he used the change to buy sweets and resold them at school to get more money and increase cash-flow.

At the age of nine, he started cleaning yards and got paid weekly. This was a great incentive for him but later he realized that the money coming in weekly was not enough to buy enough stock to satisfy the demand for the product (sweets) at school. He arranged to receive the money month-end; that improved the cash-flow and the stock levels. As the cash-flow improved, he bought a bicycle to extend his operations. The bicycle took him three years to pay off.

His first shop was a cardboard-box in front of his mother's house in the black township, called "the Location".

== Business career ==
Hauwanga opened his first spares shop in Ongwediva, selling car parts. He grew this business from suppliers in Windhoek and Johannesburg and then to the world. He has several operations around the country and has expanded into neighboring Angola. His operations in Angola are property development; he has completed several projects in Angola.

Benjamin "BH" has branches of the BH Group of Companies across Namibia with branches in Kavango, Oshana, Omusati, Khomas and Ohangwena.

Benjamin Hauwanga joins an elite group of Namibian businessmen in owning a private plane. His Beechcraft 55 Baron aircraft is believed to have cost around N$3 million. He says he bought it to improve the logistical dimensions of his business operations. He bought it from Rami Barnes, a South African entrepreneur.

Hauwanga is the owner of the Bennies Entertainment Park and Lodge in Ongwediva.

== Controversies ==
In 2008, Hauwanga was involved in a legal saga with another prominent businessman, Harold Pupkewitz over money that the BH businesses claimed to have lost in non-existent orders and deliveries from Pupkewitz. The dispute arose from payments that BH Motor Spares alleges to have made to Pupkewitz for goods that they had neither ordered nor received.

In 2009, BH was also involved in a scandal with the grandson of the former president Sam Nujoma. Joseph Nakanyala, grandson of Nujoma, tried to extort Hauwanga by using Nujoma's cell phone in June purporting to be the former president. In SMSs, Nakanyala threatened to kill Hauwanga if he did not give him money. Nakanyala was caught red-handed by the police while stealing a briefcase with money from Nujoma's residence and he later claimed that Hauwanga had sent him. Through thorough investigations it was concluded that Nakanyala made all the stories up in an attempt to extort Hauwanga. Nakanyala withdrew his claims and publicly apologized to Hauwanga through lawyer Sisa Namandje.

In a statement signed by Nakanyala, he acknowledged having made these allegations saying: "I had no basis and right at the time of making such allegations to accuse Mr Benjamin Hauwanga. I acknowledge and recognize that the allegations I made have injured the good reputation and name of Mr Hauwanga, and I unconditionally and unreservedly apologize to him, his family, friends and all those who have been affected and inconvenienced by the false allegations I made" the statement reads further. The two shook hands and embraced warmly after Nakanyala finished reading his apology.

== Honours ==
In 2011, Hauwanga received a master's degree in entrepreneurship (honoris causa) from the International University of Management (IUM).

He received a Junior Achievement Laureate in Business in 2008.
