= Osmund Mwandemele =

Namibian professor (born 1950)

Professor Osmund Mwandemele

Vice Chancellor of the International University of Management
- Incumbent
- Assumed office 1 August 2023
- Chancellor: Shekutaamba Nambala

Personal details
- Born: 2 May 1950 (age 75) Mbinga, Ruvuma Region, Tanzania
- Profession: Professor, plant breeder

Osmund Damian Mwandemele (born 2 May 1950) is a Namibian professor and vice chancellor for the International University of Management since 1 August 2023. He previously served as pro-vice chancellor for academic affairs and research at University of Namibia from 1 January 2007 to 31 December 2015.

== Early life and education ==
Mwandemele was born on 2 May 1950 in Mbinga district, Tanzania. He obtained a Bachelor of Science honours degree in education in 1976 as well as a Master of Sciences in Plant Breeding 1978, all from University of Dar es Saalam, Tanzania. He then studied at University of Sydney in Australia and obtained Doctor of Philosophy, PHD in agricultural genetics and plant breeding in 1983.

== Academic career ==
Mwandemele worked as deputy dean for the Faculty of Science at University of Dar es Saalam from 1988 to 1990. From 1990 to 1995 he served as at Egerton University in Njoro, Kenya, as a professor and director of graduate school. Mwandemele joined the University of Namibia and served as a founding dean for the Faculty of Agriculture and Natural resources from 1995 to 2004. He is also founding director of the Sam Nujoma Marine and Coastal Resources Research Centre in Henties Bay.
