= Obadja Iihuhua =

Uushunga Obadja Iihuhua (born c. 1875, Omapale, Ondonga, Ovamboland, Namibia — died 10 June 1940) was one of the first seven Ovambo pastors, whom the director of the Finnish Missionary Society, Matti Tarkkanen ordained into priesthood in Oniipa, Ovamboland, on 27 September 1925, with a permission granted by the Bishop of Tampere, Jaakko Gummerus. His brother Sakeus Iihuhua was also ordained at the same time.

Iihuhua went to school in Oniipa in 1916–19 and studied at the Oniipa pastoral seminary during 1922–25. He worked in the Oniipa school during 1920–21, and as a pastor in Uukwaluudhi in 1925 and in Uukolonkadhi during 1926–40.

Iihuhua was married in 1925 to Maria gaNepundo (b. 1906) and had two sons and three daughters with her.

== Sources ==
- Peltola, Matti (1958). Sata vuotta suomalaista lähetystyötä 1859–1959. II: Suomen Lähetysseuran Afrikan työn historia [One Hundred Years of Finnish Missionary Work 1859–1959. II: The History of FMS's Missionary Work in Africa]. Helsinki: The Finnish Missionary Society.
