= Hans Daniel Namuhuja =

Hans Daniel Namuhuja (22 October 1924 – 23 July 1998) was a Namibian poet, author, and teacher. He published in Oshindonga, a dialect of Oshiwambo, and was the first author to publish poetry in this language for which before only the Catechism and few basic texts had been created.

== Early life and education ==
Namuhuja was born on 22 October 1924 in Oniipa in the Oshikoto Region. He grew up at Epale in the household of Ondonga Queen Victoria Nashikwele Kadhikwa and attended primary school at Walvis Bay and the mission school in Oniipa. After completing secondary school education at Ongwediva Boys School he decided to become a teacher, and enrolled at Oniipa Training School. He graduated with a Lower Teaching Certificate in 1946. Two years later he went to South Africa for the Higher Teaching Diploma. In 1953 he returned to South-West Africa to teach at Oniipa Training School. He became first examiner in Oshindonga, and later School Inspector for Ovamboland.

In 1963 Namuhuja went for further studies to South Africa. He graduated with a BA (Honours) from the University College of the North, today University of the North in 1965, becoming the first Oshindonga-speaker to obtain a university degree.

== Poetry and publications ==
Namuhuja is the first author to publish poetry and non-fiction in Oshindonga. In the New Era weekly column "Celebrating Namibian Heroes and Heroines" his importance is described as:

Simply put, having published his first novel entitled Omahodhi Gaavali (Parental Tears) in 1959, makes Namuhuja one of the black Namibian pioneers in the field of literature, especially for Oshindonga language. Before the Namuhuja era, African languages in northern Namibia were restricted to the bible, catechisms and to basic numerical and literacy content. And European missionaries, who arguably most often harboured a selective appreciation and dogmatic understanding of African cultures and languages, wrote most of these.

Namuhuja published more than ten books in his lifetime. His third novel, Uuyuni uukwanampinyuka (The World does change, written in 1965) was translated into Finnish, probably the first African novel to be translated into that language. Apart from novels, he also wrote historical fiction and non-fiction, a letter writing guide, and a translation of Shakespeare's Julius Caesar. Most of his books are used as school books in Namibia.

Hans Daniel Namuhuja died in Windhoek on 23 July 1998. A Junior Secondary School (now Hans Daniel Namuhuja Senior Secondary School) at Oniipa and a literature trust are named after him.
