= Mesias Alfeus =

Namibian professor

Prof. Mesias Alfeus
- Born: 08 September 1989 (age 37); Onamutayi village, Oshana region, Namibia
- Citizenship: Namibian
- Education: University of Namibia (BS in mathematics and physics, , Stellenbosch University (Financial mathematics. (Bsc); Stellenbosch University (Financial mathematics . (Msc); University of Technology Sydney (UTS) (PhD)}}
- Scientific career
- Fields: quantitative finance, mathematician

Mesias Alfeus (born 8 September 1989) is a Namibian professor of quantitative finance at Stellenbosch University, a mathematician, and a lead principal investigator at the NITheCS Quantitative Finance Research Program (QFRP). He is currently serving as an associate professor at Stellenbosch University.

== Early life and education ==
Alfeus was born on 8 September 1989 at Onamutayi village in the Oshana region of northern Namibia and attended a primary school in the same village. He matriculated at Mweshipandeka High School and scooped the award of best learner in mathematics at a higher level.

Alfeus earned an undergraduate degree, a B.Sc., in mathematics and physics (cum laude) from the University of Namibia. During the course of his undergraduate study for three consecutive years he earned an awards of the top science student from 2010 to 2012. He then studied at Stellenbosch University and obtained a B.Sc. (honors) in financial mathematics (cum laude) in 2014 and subsequently a Master of Science in financial mathematics in 2015. Alfeus pursued a doctor of philosophy in quantitative finance studies with the University of Technology Sydney (UTS) Business School and graduated in May 2019.

== Career ==
Alfeus worked at Namfisa as a risk analyst as well as a part-time lecturer at the University of Namibia. He then moved to Australia, where he served as a lecturer at the University of Wollongong. He was offered a research position at the University of Cape Town in the department of the African Institute for Financial Markets and Risk Management, where he served for six months. The Stellenbosch University offered him a permanent position as a lecturer for financial risk management, and he rose through the ranks to associate professor. He is a leading organiser of the 14th World Congress of the Bachelier Finance Society that will be hosted in 2028 at Stellenbosch University, South Africa.

== Selected papers ==
- Alfeus, M., Mwampashi, M. M., Nikitopoulos, C. S., & Overbeck, L. (2026). Stochastic modelling and forecasting of wind capacity utilization with applications to risk management: The Australian case: A pre-registered study. Pacific-Basin Finance Journal, 103310. doi:10.1016/j.pacfin.2026.103310
- Alfeus, M., & Faff, R.W. (2026). South African fine wine investment, 2019–2023: A case study for an emerging wine region. South African Journal of Science, 122(7/8). doi:10.17159/sajs.2026/24408
- Alfeus, M., Ouwehand, P., & Harvey, J. (2026). Preface — Special Issue on Emerging Topics in Quantitative and Climate Finance. International Journal of Theoretical and Applied Finance. doi:10.1142/S0219024926020024
- Van der Merwe, K., & Alfeus, M. (2026). Benchmarking benchmarks in emerging economies: A replication study. Pacific-Basin Finance Journal. doi:10.1016/j.pacfin.2026.103353 (A Journal — ABDC)
- Alfeus, M., Blignaut, A., & Viljoen, J.-P. (2025). Cheers to enhanced portfolio performance: Wine as a unique asset class. International Journal of Theoretical and Applied Finance. doi:10.1142/S0219024925500128
