= Ongwediva Constituency =

Electoral constituency in the Oshana region of northern Namibia

Coordinates: 17°47′S 15°46′E

Ongwediva constituency (red) in the Oshana Region

Ongwediva Constituency is an electoral constituency in the Oshana Region of Namibia. It had 22,061 registered voters in 2020. Its district capital is the town of Ongwediva. Ongwediva Constituency covers an area of 222 km^{2} (86 sq mi). It had a population of 34,065 in 2011, up from 26,700 in 2001.

== Politics ==
Ongwediva is traditionally a stronghold of the South West Africa People's Organization (SWAPO) party. In the 2004 regional election SWAPO candidate Silverius Thikameni Ekandjo received 7,834 of the 8,073 votes cast. In the 2010 regional elections, SWAPO's Vinia Abisai won the constituency with 7,565 votes. He defeated challengers Nelson Katenda of the Rally for Democracy and Progress (RDP, 686 votes) and Lukas Naingungo of the Congress of Democrats (CoD, 70 votes). The 2015 regional elections were won by Andreas Uutoni (SWAPO) with 6,249 votes, far ahead of Peter Mandeinge (RDP) with 418 votes.

Councillor Uutoni (SWAPO) was reelected in the 2020 regional election, albeit by a much smaller margin. He beat Michael Mwashindange of the Independent Patriots for Change (IPC), an opposition party formed in August 2020, by 4,914 votes to 2,025.
