= Michael Amushelelo =

- Born: 21 January 1991 (age 35); Oniipa
- Other name: Saddam
- Education: Concordia College
- Occupations: Politician activist
- Years active: 2019–present
- Known for: Politics
- Title: Commissar
- Political party: Namibian Economic Freedom Fighters

Michael Amushelelo is a Namibian politician, social and political activist. A member of the Namibian Economic Freedom Fighters, he has represented Namibian workers in labour issues since his introduction into Namibian politics.

== Life ==
Amushelelo was born January 1991 in Northern Namibia at Oniipa settlement. He however grew up in Windhoek where he attended school at Moses van der Byl Primary School and would then proceed to Concordia College – where he completed his matric.

== Politics ==
Amushelelo rose to prominence in 2021 joining the Namibian Economic Freedom Fighters. Early 2022, he was arrested outside China Town in Windhoek after he had gone on a solo protest and closed Chinese owned shops. He was released months later following several court appearances.

In 2023, he was arrested again alongside others in Katutura after leading unemployment protests on Namibian Independence Day claiming many Namibians needed employment rather than celebrations. In 2022, he accused Namibian Police Chief Joseph Shikongo of using state power to shield himself from prosecution following an accident that killed one person.

In 2024, he set up a fire outside the Namibia Ministry of Labour offices, claiming the ministry had ignored the plight of Namibian workers.
