= Leonard Auala =

Namibian Lutheran Church leader

The Reverend Leonard Auala
- Bishop
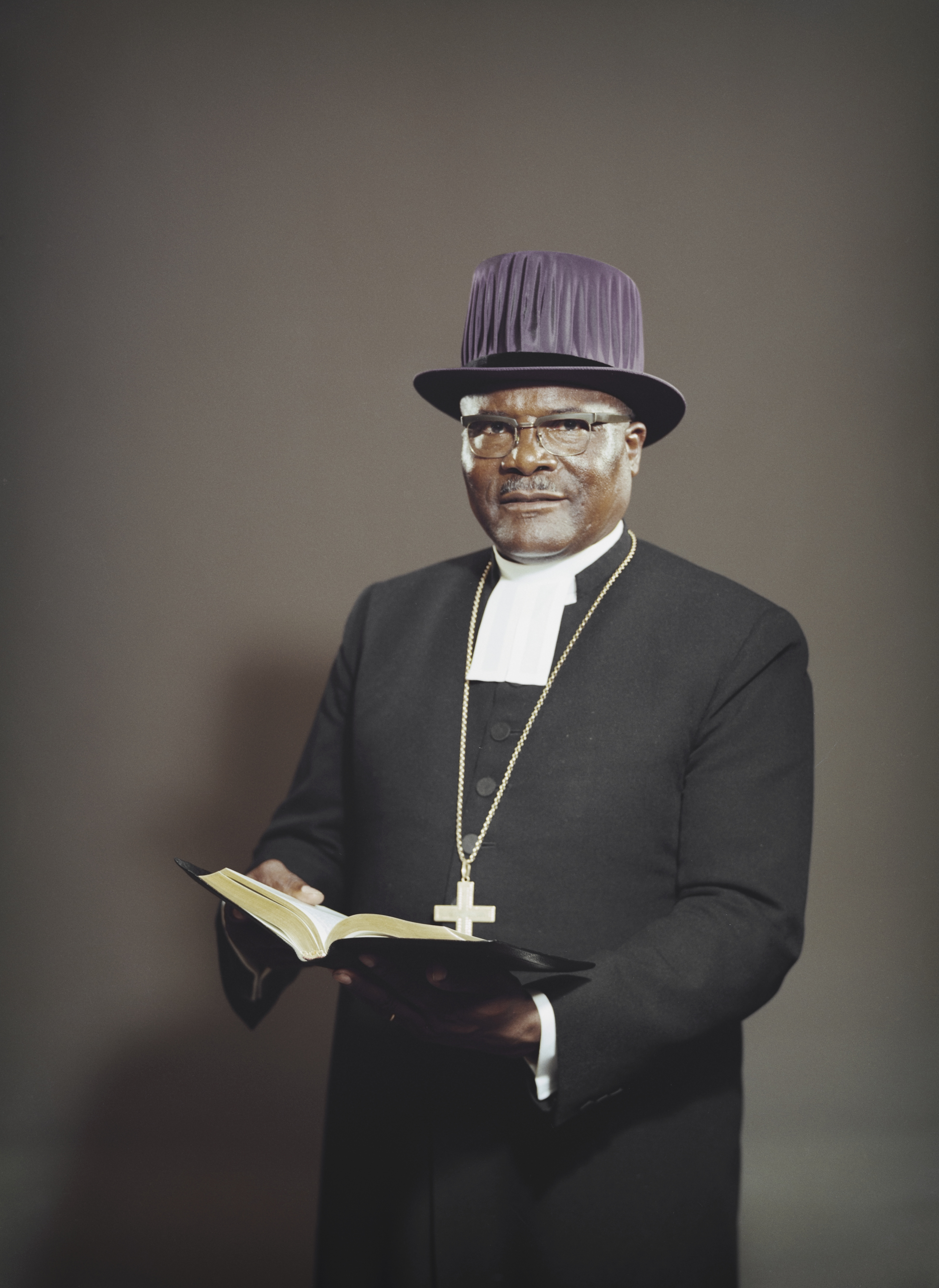
- 1967
- Church: Evangelical Lutheran Church in Namibia
- In office: 1963–1979

Personal details
- Born: 25 September 1908 Iiyale, Oniipa, Ovamboland, German South West Africa
- Died: 4 December, 1983 Onandjokwe Lutheran Hospital, South West Africa

Leonard Nangolo Auala (25 September 1908, Iiyale, Oniipa, Ovamboland, German South West Africa – 4 December 1983, Onandjokwe, South West Africa) was a Namibian Lutheran Church leader.

== Early life ==
Auala was born in Oniipa, Ovamboland, German South West Africa. He was the son of Nakanyala Vilho yaAwala (Shihwa) waAmukwiyu and Nekwaya Loide yaShikongo shaNangolo dhaAmutenya.

Auala was raised partly by Lutheran missionaries from Finland. He went to primary school in Oniipa between 1919 and 1929, and between 1929 and 1931 he attended the local teacher training seminary there. During 1934–35, he studied at Augustineum, Okahandja, 1934–35, and he received theological training in Elim in 1942, when he was ordained a pastor. He received further theological training at the Moravian Theological Seminary in Port Elizabeth, South Africa, during 1956–57.

== Career ==
Auala was consecrated a bishop in 1963 by visiting Bishop Eelis Gulin from Tampere, Finland, in connection of the Church General Synod, incorporating the Evangelical Lutheran Owambo-Kavango Church (ELOC) into the Swedish–Finnish line of apostolic succession.

Auala was the first Namibian bishop of the Evangelical Lutheran Church in Namibia (ELCIN), a member of the Lutheran World Federation. He lived most of his life under South African rule. As a prominent religious leader for both the Ovambo people and other groups across Namibia, Auala met regularly with the South Africans to discuss issues like contract labour and other facets of apartheid. A member of the South West Africa People's Organization, he received threats and harassment from the South African occupiers.

== Personal life ==
Auala was married to Aina Aluhe yaSakeus from 1935 on. They had 10 children, six sons and four daughters.

== See also ==
- 1971-72 Namibian contract workers strike § Immediate Background

Preceded by Position created	Presiding Bishop of the Evangelical Lutheran Church in Namibia; 1963–1979	Succeeded by Kleopas Dumeni
