= Ras Sheehama =

Namibian musician (1966–2025)

- Born: Hans Omehoyaaliyatala Sheehama; 29 July 1966; Onakayale, Ombalantu, South West Africa, Namibia
- Died: 5 September 2025 (aged 59); Klein Windhoek, Namibia
- Occupation: Reggae musician
- Years active: 1990–2025
- Father: David Sheehama

Hans Omehoyaaliyatala Sheehama (29 July 1966 – 5 September 2025), known professionally as Ras Sheehama, was a Namibian reggae musician whose blend of African rhythms and socially conscious lyrics made him one of Namibia's most internationally recognised artists. His music merged Rastafari influences with political commentary, his experiences of exile, and the resilience of the Namibian people.

Sheehama was the son of Namibian early prominent businessman, David Sheehama, an avid SWAPO supporter from its early days.

== Early years ==
Sheehama was born at Onakayale, a village near Outapi in Ombalantu in the Omusati Region. He was introduced to music through church choirs and local bars while growing up in northern Namibia. In 1979, when he was 12, his father's pro-SWAPO stance forced him into exile in Angola and later Zambia, where he developed a passion for reggae and began playing the guitar. There he encountered Rastafari culture, though he maintained he was not a follower, describing himself as a “rebel rasta, not a saint rasta.”

He later moved to Lagos, Nigeria, between 1984 and 1988, where he attended secondary school and performed with several reggae bands, honing his musical skills and penning early songs such as Cassinga, which was dedicated to the Cassinga massacre of 1978.

== Life in exile ==
During his time in exile, Sheehama was part of SWAPO’s Ndilimani Cultural Troupe, performing for exiled Namibians and developing his songwriting. He drew on experiences in refugee camps and his student years in Nigeria, blending political struggle with music. His early compositions, including Cassinga, reflected the trauma and resilience of Namibians in exile.

== Returning to Namibia and musical career ==
Sheehama returned to Namibia in 1990, just before the country's first free elections, and launched a solo career. He released several LPs and cassette albums with hits such as Cassinga, Inotila, Push and Pull, and City Young Girl. These became anthems in Namibia and helped cement his reputation.

His backing band featured members of South African groups Stimela and Bayete, also known for working with Lucky Dube. In 1996, Sheehama won a music award for Inotila, which led to a performance at the Le Printemps de Bourges festival in France. He later opened for artists including Manu Dibango (1995, Windhoek) and Don Carlos (2001, Johannesburg).

Internationally, Sheehama performed in Germany, the United Kingdom, Cuba, Portugal and Switzerland. His first major international performance was at the Africa Festival in Würzburg, Germany, in 1999, alongside Lucky Dube's former band, The Slaves.

== Awards ==
In 1996, Sheehama's song Inotila won Best Song at the Namibia Music Awards.

== Death ==
On 5 September 2025, Ras Sheehama died by suicide at the age of 59. He was found at his home in Windhoek, with Namibian Police confirming his death. Sheehama was buried at Anamulenge cemetery in the Omusati region. He is survived by his wife and seven children.

== Legacy ==
Sheehama's contributions to Namibian music are widely regarded as foundational. Alongside musicians such as Jackson Kaujeua, he promoted Namibian music internationally and created a unique reggae sound rooted in local realities. His songs remain popular and are remembered for their socially conscious messages and artistic originality.

== Discography ==
The following is a selected list of Ras Sheehama's studio albums:

- Kings Music (1991)
- Push and Pull (1992)
- Strictly Ras Sheehama (1995)
- Travelling (1996)
- Pure Love (2002)
- Travelling On (2006)
- The Best of 1991–2005 (2007)
- Watch Over Us (2008)

=== Selected compilation appearances ===
- “Push And Pull” on Namibia's Best Sellers Volume 1 & 2 (Various Artists compilation, 2020s)
