= Ombalantu baobab tree =

Baobab tree in Namibia

Coordinates: 17°30′43″S 14°59′16″E

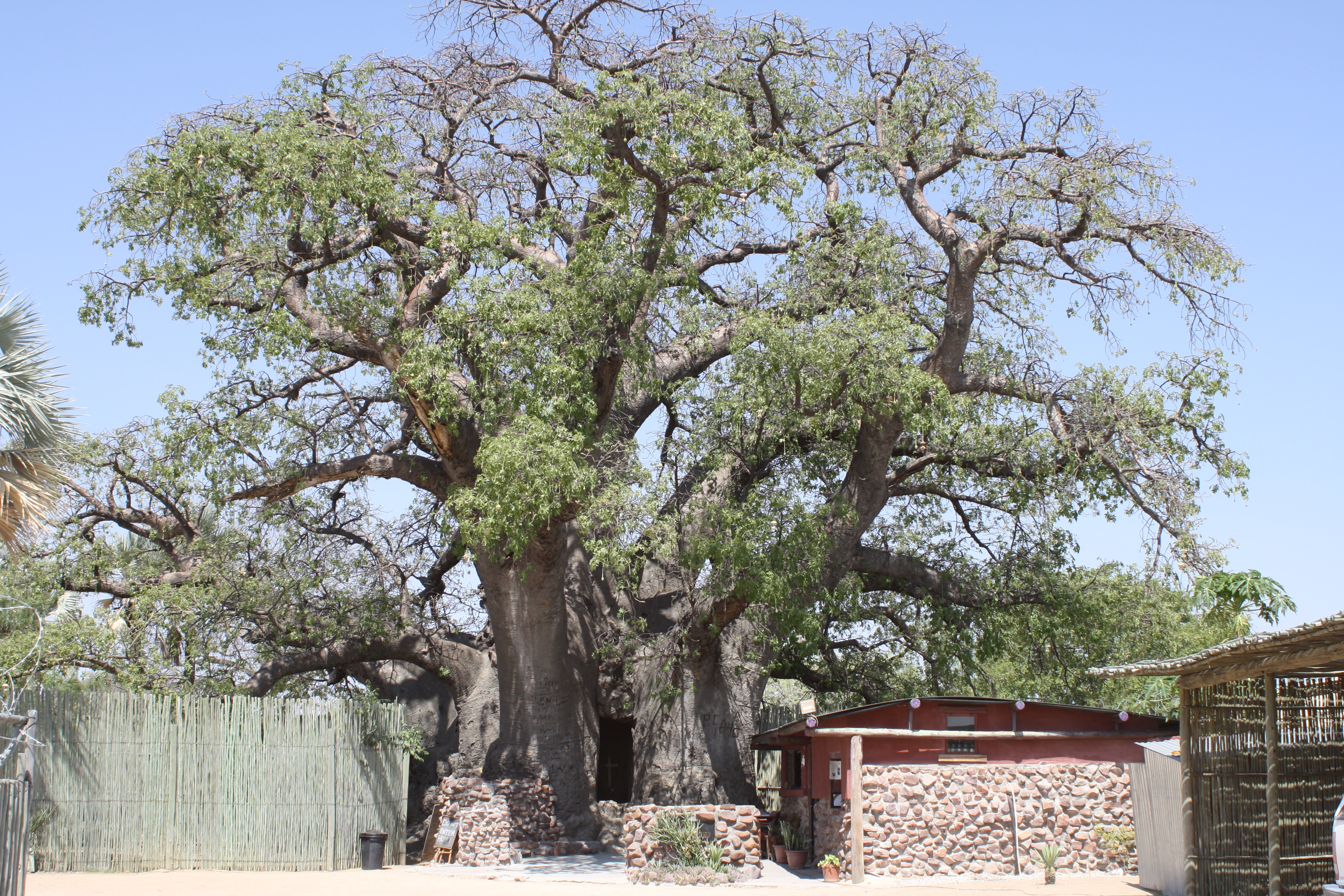
The tree in 2010

The Ombalantu baobab tree, known also as a Tree of Life or Omukwa waaMbalantu, is a giant baobab tree of the species Adansonia digitata, situated in Outapi in the north of Namibia on the M123 Main Road to Tsandi. It is 28 metres (92 ft) tall, 26.5 metres (87 ft) in circumference, and estimated to be about 800 years old.

The tree trunk has been fitted with a door and can accommodate about 35 people. It has served as a chapel, post office, house, and a hiding site during various stages of Namibian history. Today the tree is a tourist attraction, called "Ombalantu Baobab Tree Heritage Site". Since December 2004 the site features a display of the tree's history and role in the Owambo community, as well as the history of the Namibian struggle for independence.

== See also ==
- List of individual trees
