= Mweshipandeka High School =

High School in Windhoek, Namibia

Coordinates: 17.7784°S 15.7660°E

Mweshipandeka High School is a school in Ongwediva in the Oshana region of northern Namibia. It is one of the well known schools in the country, and is located in the center of Ongwediva, in Libertina Amadhila street, next to Kleine Kuppe Private School and the International University of Management. The school was founded in 1984 and bears the name of King Mweshipandeka yaShaningika of the Oukwanyama. The aim for establishing the school was to limit the distance that was travelled by prospective students from nearby towns and villages to Odibo's St Mary's High School and Oshigambo High School which were very far for students that had to walk in the olden days.

== Academics ==
The school offers junior and senior secondary education. The grades range from 8—12. It is one of the best-performing schools in Oshana region. It has a great track record of producing top students for and winning awards in most High and Ordinary level subjects. Compared to other schools in Oshakati and Ongwediva, this school always sends out many learners to all the universities in the country.

== See also ==
- Education in Namibia
- List of schools in Namibia
