= Oniipa Training School =

Teacher training school in Oniipa, Namibia

- Oniipa, Oshikoto Region; Namibia

Information
- School type: Normal school
- Established: 1913; 112 years ago

Oniipa Training School is a teacher training school in Oniipa, Namibia. It was founded in 1913. The writer Hans Daniel Namuhuja (1924-1998), author of the first novel by a Namibian of African origin, attended the school from 1944 to 1946.
