= Gabriel Taapopi Senior Secondary School =

High School in Windhoek, Namibia

Location
- Oshana Region; Namibia
- Coordinates: 17°46′2″S 15°45′38″E

Information
- Type: Secondary school
- Established: 1988
- School district: Ongwediva
- Superintendent: Patemaoshela Shawelaka
- Principal: Eelu Sakaria
- Faculty: Commerce, Science, Agriculture
- Grades: 8 - 12
- Enrollment: 1000+
- Colors: White, blue & black
- Website: www.gabrieltaapopiss.com

Gabriel Taapopi Senior Secondary School, also known as GT, is a governmental secondary school in Ongwediva in the Oshana Region of northern Namibia. The school opened its doors in 1988 and was officially inaugurated in 1989 by then SWAPO deputy education minister Buddy Wentworth. It is named after Gabriel Taapopi. Its principal is Eelu Sakaria. The school is one of the top performing schools in the country. It has around 1000 learners and about 40 teachers. The school features a large computer laboratory, physical science and biology labs as well as sports grounds.

== Sports and entertainment ==
The school has incorporated a wide range of sport activities in it is curricula. It is successfully involved in national sports competitions of netball and soccer.
