= Massabalala Yengwa =

South African lawyer and anti-apartheid activist (1923–1987)

- Born: 5 December 1923; Mapumulo, KwaZulu-Natal, South Africa
- Died: 21 July 1987 (aged 63); London, England
- Burial place: Golders Green Crematorium, London, England
- Education: University of Natal
- Occupations: lawyer and anti-apartheid activist
- Organization: African National Congress

Massabalala Bonnie "M. B." Yengwa (born 5 December 1923–21 July 1987) was a South African lawyer, anti-apartheid activist and the Natal Provincial Secretary of the African National Congress Youth League (ANCYL).

== Family and education ==
Yengwa was born in 1923 near Mapumulo, in Kwa-Zulu Natal. His father was a Zulu labourer, who had participated in the Bambatha Rebellion of 1906 and had been jailed during the African National Congress (ANC) anti-pass campaign of 1919. He attended secondary school in Richmond and from 1945 he studied part time at the University of Natal.

He married Edith Minah Sibisi on 21 September 1957 in Maqumbi.

== Activism in South Africa ==
Yengwa became active in the anti-apartheid movement and joined the ANC, becoming provincial secretary of the ANCYL. In 1951, he was elected to the Natal Provincial Executive Committee of the ANC. He served until 1960. He was a close ally of Albert John Luthuli and was part of a group, including Herbert Isaac Ernest Dhlomo and Jordan Ngubane, who were instrumental in Luthuli's election as ANC president. Yengwa later became Luthuli's secretary, later travelling with him and his wife to Oslo, Norway, when Luthuli received the Nobel Peace Prize in 1961.

In 1952, Yengwa was appointed as Volunteer-in-Chief and as joint secretary, alongside Marimuthu Pragalathan Naicker, of the Joint Action Council in Natal for the Defiance Campaign of the South African Indian Congress (SAIC). He was imprisoned for two weeks due his activities as a passive resister. He next attended the Queenstown Conference of the ANC, where he met and began an association with fellow activists Oliver Tambo and Nelson Mandela. Yengwa was banned by the government in May 1953, prohibiting him from attending any political or public gatherings or from leaving Durban. In 1955, he was banished to Mapumulo for two years.

He was charged alongside 155 other activists at the 1956 Treason Trials, but was acquitted and discharged a year later. He was called to Pretoria to appear as one of the defence witnesses for treason defendants in September 1960, where he reiterated in response to several questions that the ANC followed a policy of non-violence to achieve their political aims. He was arrested again in 1963 and was imprisoned in solitary confinement. Yengwa served 18 months in jail, and when released was placed under 24-hour house arrest in Maqombi in Mapumulo, unable to leave or work.

== Refugee in Swaziland and England ==
In 1966, Yengwa fled to Swaziland, followed by his wife Edith and their children, where he practiced as a solicitor. In 1969, following pressure from the South African government on Swaziland, Yengwa and his family were deported and moved to the United Kingdom as refugees. He attended dissidents meetings in exile.

After Albert Luthuli's death in 1967, from London Yengwa served as one of the trustees of the Luthuli Memorial Foundation (LMF), alongside American activist Mary Louise Hooper and Luthuli's widow Nokukhanya Bhengu.

In England he also translated works from Zulu into English (with some of his translations held in the collection of the library of the School of Oriental and African Studies (SOAS), University of London) and gave lectures on Zulu music and praise songs.

Yengwa was a religious man and represented the ANC at the World Council of Churches meeting in Geneva.

== Death and legacy ==
Yengwa died in 1987 in London. A road in Durban has been renamed to Masabalala Yengwa Avenue in his honour.
