= Oniipa Constituency =

Electoral constituency in the Oshikoto region of northern Namibia

Coordinates: 17°54′45″S 16°02′34″E

Oniipa constituency (red) in the Oshikoto Region

Oniipa Constituency is an electoral constituency in the Oshikoto Region of Namibia. It had 23,913 inhabitants in 2004 and 14,236 registered voters in 2020. The constituency office is situated in the town of Oniipa. Further settlements in this constituency are Oshigambo, and Onandjokwe, the latter being a part of Oniipa.

== Politics ==
Oniipa constituency is traditionally a stronghold of the South West Africa People's Organization (SWAPO) party. In the 2004 regional election SWAPO candidate Johannes Sheepo Shiindi received 6,748 of the 6,850 votes cast. Shiindi was reelected in the 2010 regional elections with 95.5% of all votes cast in the constituency.

In the 2015 local and regional elections the SWAPO candidate won uncontested and became councillor after no opposition party nominated a candidate. The SWAPO candidate also won the 2020 regional election. Vilho Nuunyango received 3,930 votes, well ahead of Mateus Elifas of the Independent Patriots for Change (IPC), a party formed in August 2020, who obtained 1,717 votes.

== See also ==
- Administrative divisions of Namibia
