= Sakeus Iihuhua =

Nangombe Sakeus Iihuhua (born c. 1885, Omapale, Ondonga, Ovamboland, Namibia — died 22 June 1976) was one of the first seven Ovambo pastors, whom the director of the Finnish Missionary Society, Matti Tarkkanen ordained into priesthood in Oniipa, Ovamboland, on 27 September 1925, with a permission granted by the Bishop of Tampere, Jaakko Gummerus. His brother Obadja Iihuhua was also ordained at the same time.

Iihuhua was baptized in 1902 in Oniipa by Frans Hannula. He went to school in Oniipa during 1906–07 and in Onayena during 1908–12, and in the Oniipa vocational school during 1913–16. He attended the Oniipa pastoral seminary during 1922–25 and was ordained in 1925.

Even before his ordination, Iihuhua was a man of influence in Ombalantu. He had been working there as a teacher between 1917 and 1921. The king of Ombadja in Angola had had a dream and sent a man to Iihuhua, so that he could obtain a teacher into his kingdom. However, this could not be arranged at the time.

Before Iihuhua was ordained, the church services in Ombalantu had been performed by a Finnish missionary from Okahao. When Iihuhua had been ordained, he was joined by the Finn Heikki Saari in Ombalantu, at the mission station of Nakayale.

Iihuhua then worked from 1925 to 1976 in Nakayale, and he was described as a "great pillar of his own parish". Elias Pentti wrote in 1958 of him, that "in spite of his age, he had remained surprisingly active and still had a burning desire to serve the cause of the Gospel."

The Sakeus Iihuhua Primary School in the Omusati Region is named after him.

== Sources ==
- Nambala, Shekutaamba V. V. (1995). Ondjokonona yaasita naateolohi muELCIN 1925–1992 ['Register of ELCIN Clergy 1925–1992']. Oniipa, Namibia: ELCIN. p. 94.
- Peltola, Matti (1958). Sata vuotta suomalaista lähetystyötä 1859–1959. II: Suomen Lähetysseuran Afrikan työn historia [One Hundred Years of Finnish Missionary Work 1859–1959. II: The History of FMS's Missionary Work in Africa]. Helsinki: The Finnish Missionary Society.
- Pentti, Elias, ed. (1958). Ambomaa [Ovamboland]. Helsinki: Finnish Missionary Society.
