= Willem Amutenya =

Namibian politician (born 1988)

The Honourable Willem Amutenya

Member of National Assembly
- Incumbent
- Assumed office 21 March 2025
- President: Netumbo Nandi-Ndaitwah
- Prime Minister: Elijah Ngurare
- Vice President: Lucia Witbooi

Personal details
- Born: 18 June 1988 (age 37) Lubango, Angola
- Party: SWAPO

Willem Amutenya (born 18 June 1988 in Lubango) is a Namibian politician, farmer, and youth leader. He is an elected member of Parliament and has been currently serving as a legislator in the National Assembly since 21 March 2025, representing the SWAPO Party of Namibia.

== Education and career ==
Amutenya holds a master of education in educational leadership management and policy education from International University of Management and an honours degree in education from the University of Namibia, majoring in science. He matriculated from Oshigambo High School. Prior to joining the National Assembly, Amutenya served as a student leadership and development officer at the University of Namibia from 2019 to 2024. Amutenya worked at the International University of Management as an assistant lecturer from 2015 to 2018. From 2015 to 2018, he served as a personal assistant to the then Minister of Home Affairs and Immigration, the Honourable Pendukeni Ivula-Ithana. Amutenya was also a school teacher, teaching biology, life science, and physical science at Reverend Juuso Shikongo Secondary School from 2011 to 2015.

== Politics ==
While studying at the University of Namibia, he became politically active in student politics, culminating in his election as president of the Student Representative Council (SRC). After graduating, Amutenya remained politically active in politics through the SWAPO Party Youth League (SPYL) and the Regional Youth Forum in the Oshikoto Region. This has led to him being elected to be a member of the SPYL regional central committee in 2021 and eventually serving at the national level within the SPYL as an executive secretary for labour and justice.
