= Olufuko festival =

Annual festival in Outapi, Namibia

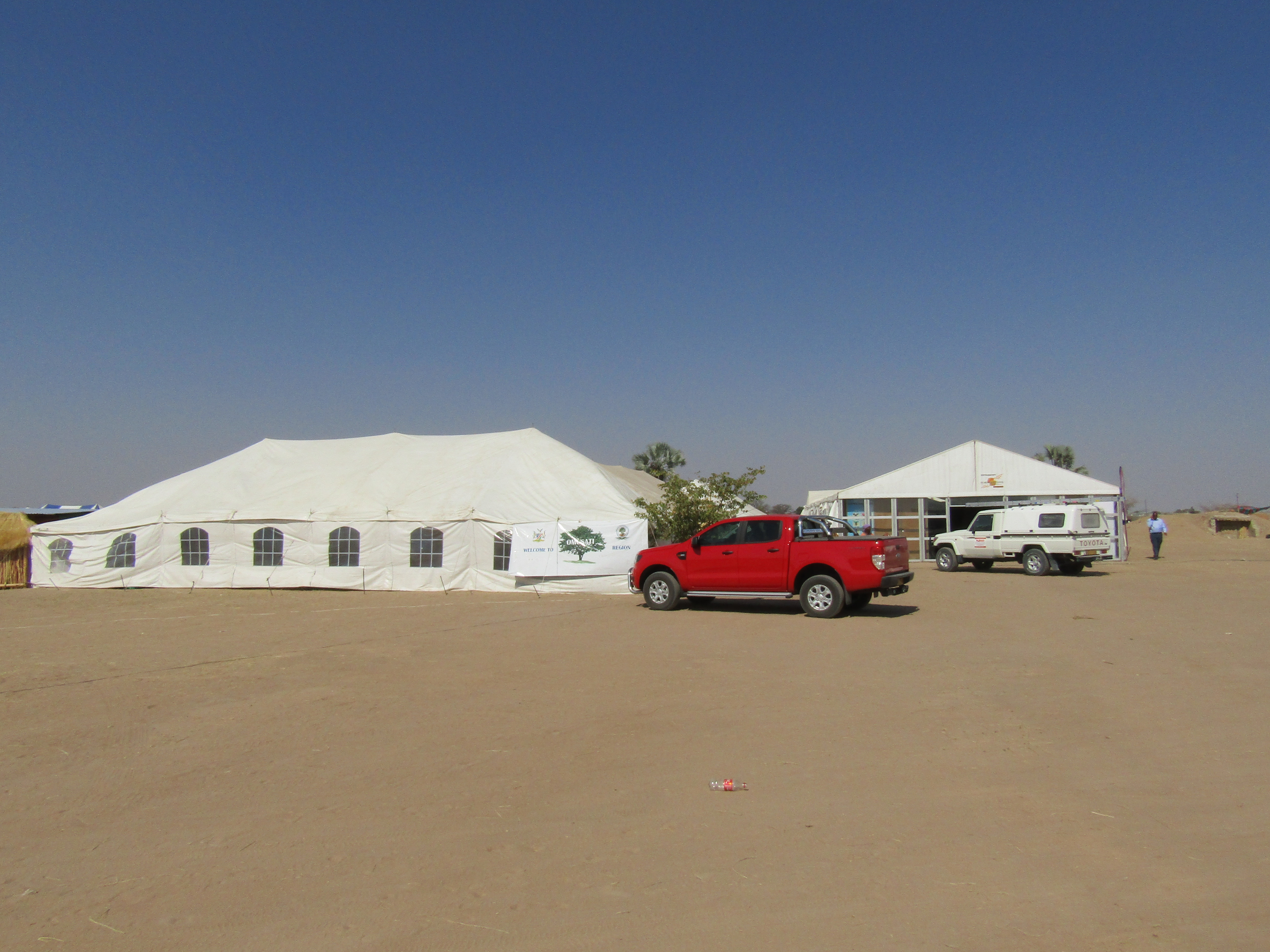
Outapi Fairground

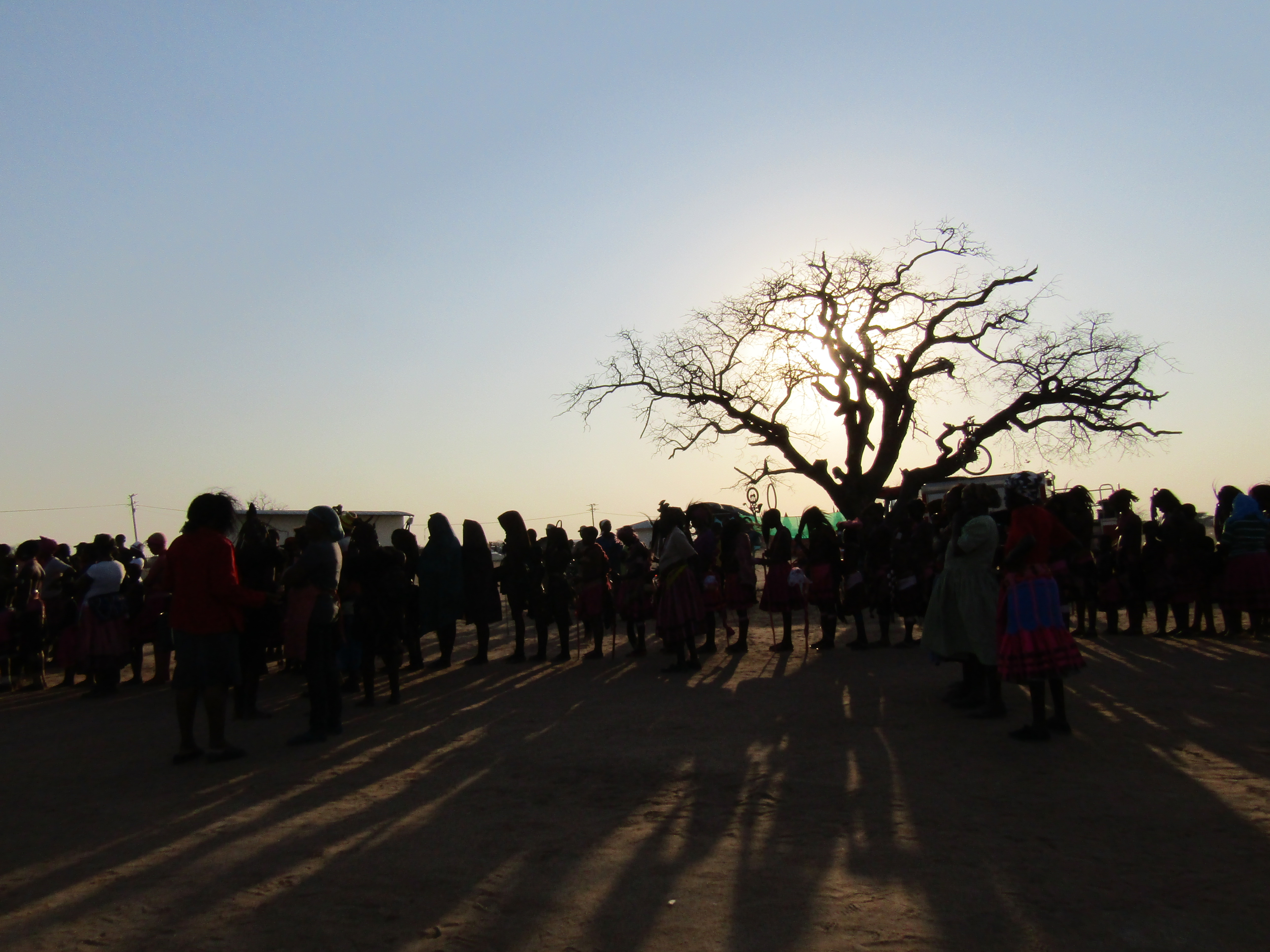
Olufuko March of the brides

Olufuko (from an Oshiwambo word meaning wedding) is an Aawambo traditional practice where girls as young as 12, but typically between the age of 15 and 20, are prepared for womanhood, including marriage, pregnancy, and caring for families. This means they are taught how to do traditional chores at home, such as pounding omahangu, cooking, cultivating and understanding the roles of men and women in society and recently the impact of HIV/AIDS, STDs and other diseases in society. After Olufuko, brides are expected to go back to school and finish school and not to get married immediately as used to be the practice in the olden days. Several speakers at the Olufuko Official Opening Ceremony have used the occasion to urge all girls to go back to school and none of the girls were ever handed over to a man to get married after the initiation ceremony. People under the age of 16 are considered minors under the Namibian Constitution.

The Olufuko festival is held annually in Outapi, Namibia. It was officially opened on 23 August 2012 by Sam Nujoma, founding President of the Republic of Namibia. Outapi is a town in the Omusati Region in Namibia.

This practice is performed by an elderly man, known as Namunganga, and is accompanied by drumming and dancing. It turns girls and young women into brides, without grooms. This initiation has been banned by the mainstream Christian churches, labelling the practice pagan, and against Christianity.

== Objectives ==
Among others, the objectives of the festival are to:

1. Inform, educate and entertain with the aim to appreciate and enhance traditional and cultural identity.
2. Create tourism opportunities.
3. Enhance the purpose of unity amongst the people.
4. Create awareness within the region through cultural, arts and agricultural activities.
5. Preserve and promote culture and tradition.
6. Strengthen the local and regional economy.

== Implications ==
Girls cannot reject Olufuko, because rejection would bring a curse; e.g., they might never marry, have unwanted pregnancies, sterility or the death of a parent. Traditionally a girl who turns down Olufuko is manhandled, tied up and dragged to the Olufuko homestead. Meekulu Saara Walaula, the wife of Aambadja Senior Chief Tatekulu Mathias Walaula, said the Olufuko initiation lasts for seven days and each day serves a purpose. The person ordained to carry out Olufuko is called Namunganga. This practice occurs yearly and many girls partake.

== Process ==
Olufuko commences with a day called ekoho when the brides' mothers prepare the fireplaces where food is prepared. This is followed by omakunde and okambadjona when the parents slaughter cattle for their daughters. The fourth day is efundula (the wedding day). From that day on, the girls are confirmed as prospective brides. Single men and polygamists may start to show their interest in the daughters by placing jewelry or bracelets on the wrists of the women of their choice. The woman has the right to choose any of the men or to reject them all. The fifth day is epito letanda, or initiation day; its rituals include a walk around the Olufuko homestead at night when everyone is asleep and returning to the house through a special entrance. That night the brides sleep in Ondjuwo, a special hut built for them.

According to the prevailing belief, pregnant brides or girls that have had an abortion can never go through the rituals and are unable to even if they wished to, due to the influence of supernatural forces. After the rituals the girls are officially prospective brides and will be referred to as brides until they accept a proposal or fall pregnant. On the last day, the girls are "cleansed" by rubbing their bodies with butter mixed with traditional red dye or ochre with oshifima (porridge); the butter and dye mixture is also smeared on the girls at the commencement of the ceremony. On this day, okandjibululwena, mothers and brides can leave the Olufuko homestead and return to their homes.

Bringing back Olufuko ceremony. The Olufuko ended in the 1940s but was held by Omusati Regional Council in conjunction with Outapi Town Council and traditional authorities at Outapi town in northern Namibia.

Namrights said Olufuko is "discriminatory and degrading against girls". Opponents claimed that Olufuko would contribute to the spread of HIV/AIDS, dropping out of school, teenage pregnancy and promiscuity and called it unconstitutional. They claim that Olufuko is an infringement of human rights, since young girls are forced into this initiation process. Pregnancy before marriage after Olufuko is acceptable and is not a taboo. People under 16 are considered minors under the Namibian Constitution.

== Olufuko in modern culture ==
Olufuko is the theme of an annual festival, hosted in Outapi, Omusati Region, Namibia. The 'Olufuko festival' was launched in 2012.

The Founding President of the Republic of Namibia, H.E. Dr. Sam Nujoma, is the patron of Olufuko Festival. Nujoma emphasized that a “nation without a culture and tradition is not a nation". The event was a success and will continue under the slogan Our Heritage Our Pride.
