= Shekutaamba Nambala =

Namibian bishop

The Reverend Dr. Shekutaamba Väinö yaVäinö Nambala BA (Hons), CSCARM, CSM, MA, ThM, ThD
- Bishop emeritus of the Evangelical Lutheran Church of Namibia
- Church: Evangelical Lutheran Church in Namibia
- Installed: 2012
- Retired: 2021
- Other posts: Bishop of the Eastern Diocese, 2011-2012; Chancellor International University of Management, Namibia (IUM) 2018 - Present

Personal details
- Born: 5 August 1952 (age 74) Ondonga, Omuntele
- Spouse: Menette Ndeyapo yaNgula Mateus gaNuulimba (m. 1983)
- Children: 4

Shekutaamba Väinö yaVäinö Nambala (born 5 August 1952, Onewawa, Onyaanya, Ondonga, Namibia) is a retired Bishop in the Evangelical Lutheran Church in Namibia.

Shekutaamba Väinö Väinö Nambala, popularly known as S V V Nambala, was born from a peasant family at Onewawa village, Omuntele constituency, in Ondonga kingdom in the Oshikoto Region today, on the 5 th August 1952. He is the second last born of 19 siblings. His education career started at the age of ten in 1962. He attended school at Ondjamba Primary School (1962 – 1963); Omuntele Primary and High Primary School (1964 – 1968); Onayena Boys School (1969); Ongwediva High School (1970 – 1973) and Oshigambo High School (1975 – 1976).

== Early life ==
=== Childhood: 1953-1976 ===
Shekutaamba Väinö Väinö Nambala, popularly known as S V V Nambala, was born on 5 August 1952 in a peasant family at Onewawa village, Omuntele constituency, in Ondonga kingdom within Oshikoto Region, Namibia. He is the second last born of 19 siblings. His education career started at the age of ten in 1962. He attended school at Ondjamba Primary School (1962 – 1963); Omuntele Primary and High Primary School (1964 – 1968); Onayena Boys School (1969); Ongwediva High School (1970 – 1973) and Oshigambo High School (1975 – 1976).

=== Education: 1977-2005 ===
Nambala furthered his education and obtained numerous certificates, diplomas and degrees as follows: 1. Diploma in Theology, Luther Theological College, Natal, RSA, 1977 – 1980. 2. Certificate in Auto Mechanics, Engineering College of South Africa (ECOSA), Johannesburg, 1983 – 1984. 3. Certificate in Mission and Stewardship, Luther Seminary, St. Paul, USA, 1983 4. Masters of Arts (Medical Ethics and Philosophy), Luther Seminary, USA, 1984 – 1986 5. Masters of Divinity (Certificate not issued due to concurrence with MA), LNTS, USA, 1984 – 1986 6. Masters of Theology (History), Luther Seminary, USA, 1987 7. Language Studies: English, Spanish, Germany and French, University of Minnesota, 1988. 8. Doctor of Theology (History), Luther Seminary, USA, 1988 – 1990 9. Bachelor of Arts (Hons, in History), UNAM, 1992 – 1993 10. Certificate in Management, Cranfield University, School of Management, UK, 1998 11. Certificate in Project Design and Monitoring, Windhoek, 1999 12. Certificate in Financial Management and Accountability, Johannesburg, 1999 13. Studies in Management of Public Records and Archives, Helsinki, Finland, 2005

=== College and work career: 1966-2021 ===
Nambala was ordained pastor into holy ministry of the Evangelical Lutheran Church in Namibia (ELCIN) on 12 July 1981 and retired from official ministry in December 2021. Among his work experiences are the following:

1.Sales person, Lukas Abed Store & Cuca Shop, Omuntele, 1966 – 1968 2.Short term employee at M&Z Co. and Tsumeb Bakery, Tsumeb, 1972 & 1973 respectively. 3.School Teacher, Omuntele Lower and Higher Primary School, 1974 4.Freelance journalist, 1975 – 5.Pastorate: Onayena, 1981 – 1984, Omuntele, 1981 and Hope Lutheran Church, St. Paul, Minnesota, USA, 1985 – 1990 5.Tutor on Southern Africa Social Context and Politics, Luther Seminary, 1989 – 1990 6.Secretary to the Bishop, ELCIN, Oniipa, 1990 – 1992 7.Researcher and writer of Church History, 1992 – 1993 8.Finance and Development Director, ELCIN, 1994 – 2006 9.Curator of Church Archives, ELCIN, 2007 – 2008 10.Lecturer of Theology, Ministry in Context and Sociology, United Lutheran Theological Seminary (ULTS), Paulinum, Windhoek, 2009 – March 2011 11.Elected and consecrated Bishop in ELCIN on 13 March 2011. 12.Bishop of ELCIN Eastern Diocese and Presiding Bishop of ELCIN, March 2011 – 2021 14.President of the Lutheran Churches in Southern Africa (LUCSA) 2013 – 2016 Chancellor of the International University of Management (IUM), 2018 –

Nambala was sworn in as the third chancellor of the International University of Management (IUM) in August 2018 replacing Bishop Emeritus Kleopas Dumeni.

Nambala attended pastoral training at Mapumulo, South Africa, and obtained a Diploma in Theology in 1977–1980. He was ordained as pastor in 1981 at Ongwediva. Nambala pursued further studies in St. Paul, Minnesota, United States from 1983 to 1986, obtaining a master’s degree in theology, majoring in church history. From 1987 to 1990 he studied to obtain a doctorate in theology, his thesis is titled: State and church in Namibia, 1806-1989. He was consecrated Bishop of the Eastern Diocese and Presiding Bishop of the ELCIN in 2011 at Ongwediva. He was consecrated on some day together with Bishop Josafat Shanghala of the Western Diocese of the ELCIN, by Presiding Bishop Dr. Tomas Shivute.

=== Awards ===
He received awards: 1.Diploma of Excellency in Science and Mathematics, Ongwediva High School, 1973 2.Accorded Veteran status by the Namibia Government, 2012 3.The Most Distinguished Order of Namibia: Second Class, by the Government of the Republic of Namibia, 2014

Shekutaamba V V Nambala wrote several books, chapters and articles since 1975. He published 15 books on different topics including an Encyclopaedia set of six books on Omazimo gAawambo (Ovambo Clans) and co-authored 5 books, including History of churches in Namibia and Hambelela nyokokulu: Ondjokonona yaELCIN, 1870-1990.

Nambala retired in 2021.

== Personal life ==
Nambala is married to a teacher and Inspector of Schools, Menette Ndeyapo yaMateus Ngula yaNuulimba, at Okaku on the 8th January1983.

They have four children, 3 sons and 1 daughter: Shalongo Indongo; Katwali Kampunda, Kristofina Ndevaama and Natango Tsenaye, and 2 boys grandchildren: Shetulimba Matias and Onni.

== Extra readings ==
- History of the church in Namibia (1994) by Shekutaamba V. V Nambala, ISBN 978-0895793034, ISBN 0895793032

Preceded by Tomas Shivute	Presiding Bishop of the Evangelical Lutheran Church in Namibia; 2012–2021	Succeeded by incumbent
