= Onethindi =

Village in Oshikoto region, Namibia

Coordinates: 17.9368°S 16.0306°E

Onethindi is a settlement in northern Namibia in the Oshikoto Region, 5 km away from Ondangwa. In 2015 part of it was incorporated into Oniipa.

== History ==
Onethindi was named after the late Nethindi, first headman of Onethindi. As of 2009 the headman was Brian Ndauka.

Situated on a farm named Onethindi Townlands 1002, two portions of the farm were declared townships in 2006. The first portion, named Onethindi, consists of 251 erven, the second portion, in 2006 named Onethindi Extension 1, consists of 298 erven. In 2014, the area became part of the Onethindi-Oniipa Settlement Area. In 2015 the portion originally named Onethindi was incorporated into Oniipa town. Onethindi Extension 1 continues to exist as a separate entity.

== Facilities ==
Onethindi has a few shops and eateries, a bank, a hotel and a casino. It lies on the B1 main road.
