= International University of Management =

Private university in Namibia

- Motto: Encourage and develop an African cadre of men and women who can operate at international standards in business.
- Type: Private
- Established: 1994; 32 years ago
- Chancellor: Rtd. Bishop Dr. Shekutaamba Nambala
- Vice-Chancellor: Prof. Dr. Osmund Mwandemele
- Students: 24,030
- Location: Windhoek with campuses in Swakopmund, Walvis Bay, Nkurenkuru, Ongwediva and Eenhana, Namibia
- Campus: Both urban and rural
- Website: ium.edu.na

The International University of Management (IUM) is a private, state-recognized university based in Windhoek, Namibia. It has campuses in Swakopmund, Walvis Bay, Ongwediva, Nkurenkuru and Eenhana.

== History ==
The university was founded by David Namwandi in 1994 with one professor and one student in Windhoek North. Namwandi also served as IUM's vice-chancellor from 2001 until he was appointed deputy Minister of Education in 2010. The IUM vice-chancellor position was taken over by Namwandi's wife, Virginia.

In 2002 IUM it was accorded university status. It opened another campus in the Dorado Park neighbourhood of Windhoek in April 2011. President Hifikepunye Pohamba applauded the university's expansion and called for further public-private partnership in tertiary education.

== Programs ==
The university offers Bachelor, Master and Doctor of Philosophy programs, in strategic management, information technology, human resources, travel, tourism, and hospitality, business information systems, business administration, finance management, HIV/Aids management and other subjects.

== Notable alumni ==
- Pendukeni Ivula-Ithana holds an MBA from IUM
- Michael Mwashindange, member of Parliament and youth leader-class of 2019
- Willem Amutenya, member of Parliament and youth politician-class of 2024
