= Nakayale =

Coordinates: 17°34′S 15°00′E

Nakayale, also known as Nakayale Keengulu, is a village in northern Namibia near Outapi in Omusati Region situated 86km northwest of Oshakati and 4km from Outapi. It is in Anamulenge Constituency.

== History of the mission station ==
An auxiliary mission station was founded in Nakayale in 1917. The teacher Sakeus Iihuhua, who had graduated from the teacher training seminary of Oniipa, was stationed there. Around that time, a great many Ovambadja moved from Angola to the Ombalantu tribal area, in order to escape the famine in Angola.

In 1925, Nakayale became an official mission station, when Heikki Saari settled permanently there. In the same year, Sakeus Iihuhua was ordained a minister, as one of the first Ovambos who became pastors. The following year the Aambalantu built a church in Nakayale, mainly by themselves. The missionary Heikki Saari relates, that “the youngest builder was a four-year-old ward of the mission station, who could only carry one brick at a time, but the tirelessness of this small brick bearer was an utterly moving sight to see.”

Pastor Saari worked in Nakayale until 1931, when he was replaced by Tuure Vapaavuori. His wife Aino Vapaavuori, who was a deaconess, took care of the policlinic at Nakayale.

During the years 1931–1935 the Nakayale Parish primary schools had between 163 and 217 students. The school was taught in the church building, but as there were two classes to teach there by two teachers, it was thought that better premises were needed, and thus Vapaavuori began in 1934 to build a separate school building. In 1935, the Vapaavuori couple were transferred to Ondonga, to the Onayena mission station.

Later Finnish missionaries in Nakayale included nurse Ebba von Pfaler (1934–47, 1952–57), doctor Eila Plathán-Saarinen (1951–54) and nurses Helmi Makkonen, Kaino Kovanen and Anneli Linkola.

== Climate ==
The village normally receives an annual average rainfall of 440 millimetres (17 in), although in the 2010/2011 rainy season 723 millimetres (28.5 in) were measured.

== Surroundings ==
Nakayale has two schools, Nakayale Primary School, now named the Sakeus Iihuhua School and Erkki Tauya Junior Secondary School. There is a main branch of ELCIN (Evangelical Lutheran Church in Namibia) church for all northern ELCIN churches which was named after the village itself, and a center for disabled people. The primary local language is Oshiwambo Oshimbalantu and some residents also speak English. Nakayale is one of the hottest places in northern Namibia with temperatures ranging between 26 and 30 degrees Celsius. Villages around Nakayale are Okapanda, Onamulunga, Omukoko, Okaile, Oshambomba City, Ondjamba Nevu, Okalonda, and Okakwa. Blue Birds FC, a soccer team, is also from Nakayale.

== Sources ==
- Peltola, Matti (1958). Sata vuotta suomalaista lähetystyötä 1859–1959. II: Suomen Lähetysseuran Afrikan työn historia [‘One Hundred Years of Finnish Missionary Work 1859–1959. II: The History of FMS’s Missionary Work in Africa’]. Helsinki: The Finnish Missionary Society. p. 91.
- Salo, Eeva (1993). Tuure Vapaavuori lähetystyöntekijänä Ambomaalla ja Angolassa vuosina 1931–1946 [‘Tuure Vapaavuori as a missionary in Ovamboland and Angola during 1931–1946’]. Helsinki University, Faculty of Theology. M. Div. thesis in church history.
