= Evangelical Lutheran Church in Namibia =

Church community in Namibia

- Symbol of Lutheranism
- Classification: Protestant
- Orientation: Lutheran
- Theology: Lutheran theology
- Polity: Episcopal
- Presiding Bishop: Shekutaamba Nambala
- Associations: Lutheran World Federation; Lutheran Communion in Southern Africa; United Church Council: Namibia Evangelical Lutheran Churches; Council of Churches in Namibia; World Council of Churches
- Region: Namibia
- Headquarters: Oniipa
- Origin: 1954; Engela
- Congregations: 123
- Members: 772,398
- Ministers: 143
- Secondary schools: 2
- Other name: Evangelical Lutheran Ovambo-Kavango Church
- Official website: www.elcinorg.com

The Evangelical Lutheran Church in Namibia (ELCIN) is a Lutheran denomination based in Namibia. It had a total membership of over 853,522 in 2023, mainly in northern Namibia. Formerly known as the Evangelical Lutheran Ovambo-Kavango Church (ELOC), it played a significant role in opposition to Apartheid in Namibia and was part of the Namibian independence struggle.

Other Lutheran churches in Namibia are the southern-based Evangelical Lutheran Church in the Republic of Namibia and the German-speaking Evangelical Lutheran Church in Namibia (GELK).

The last presiding bishop was Shekutaamba Nambala. He retired in 2021; by the end of 2022, the post was still vacant.

On the 14 August 2024 during Synod XXV at the ELCIN center in Ongwediva, two bishops were elected: Rev Hilja Ndatala - Eenyofi Nghaangulwa for the Eastern Diocese and Rev Gideon Niitenge for the Western Diocese. Hilja is the first female pastor to be elected as bishop.

== History ==
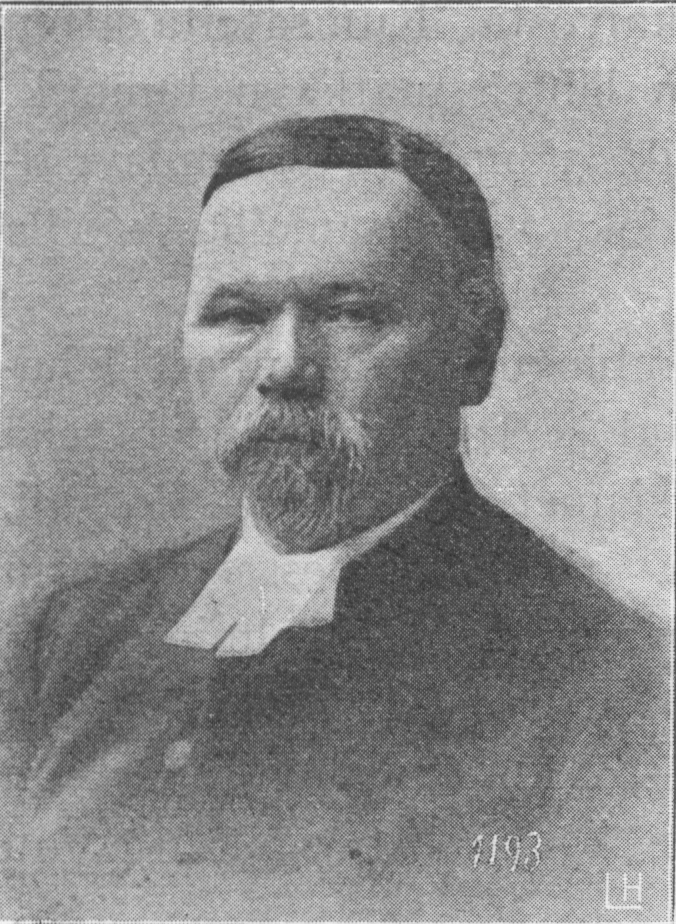
Pietari Kurvinen, a Finnish missionary in 1909

The church developed out of the work of the Finnish Missionary Society that began in 1870 among the Ovambo and Kavango people in the northern area of what became German South West Africa. In 1954, an independent church known as the Evangelical Lutheran Ovambo-Kavango Church (ELOC) was established with Birger Eriksson as its first president. On 30 June 1963, Eelis Gulin of the Evangelical Lutheran Church of Finland consecrated as a bishop Leonard Auala of the Evangelical Lutheran Owambo-Kavango Church, incorporating the Evangelical Lutheran Owambo-Kavango Church into the Swedish–Finnish line of apostolic succession.

The first Namibian bishop of ELOC, Leonard Auala, played a notable role in the struggle for Namibia's independence. In 1971, an open letter was written jointly with Moderator Paulus Gowaseb of the Rhenish Mission's United Evangelical Lutheran Church in South West Africa (later known as the Evangelical Lutheran Church in the Republic of Namibia) to the Prime Minister of South Africa, B. J. Vorster that declared their churches' opposition to the continued rule of South Africa and the acceptance of the recommendation by the International Court of Justice for the withdrawal of South Africa's mandate and a transition period towards independence.

In 1984, ELOC's name was officially changed to its current iteration, the Evangelical Lutheran Church in Namibia.

Auala's successor, Kleopas Dumeni, also played an important role in highlighting the plight of Namibians under South African rule. Bishop Dumeni suffered personal losses in the struggle including the death of his 18-year-old daughter in a bomb blast in 1988.

In 2007, ELCIN together with the Evangelical Lutheran Church in the Republic of Namibia and the German-speaking Evangelical Lutheran Church in Namibia (GELK) formed the United Church Council: Namibia Evangelical Lutheran Churches, with the ultimate aim of becoming one united national Lutheran church.

== Structure ==
The church was originally led by a moderator elected from amongst the clergy. In the 1960s, the church adopted episcopal polity and was subsequently led by a bishop. In 1992, the church was divided into two dioceses, the Eastern Diocese and the Western Diocese, each led by its own bishop, and since 1996 a Presiding Bishop has been elected to preside over the whole ELCIN.

There have been calls for the Western Diocese to be further divided into two, to create a total of three dioceses. Two further dioceses would be added by the proposed amalgamation with Namibia's other two Lutheran denominations, a process which is under discussion.

=== Moderators and Presiding Bishops ===
Moderators of ELOC

- Birger Eriksson (1954 – 1958)
- Alpo Hukka (1958 – 1960)
- Leonard Auala (1960 – 1963)

Bishops of ELOC (episcopal polity adopted 1963)

- Leonard Auala (1963 – 1978)
- Kleopas Dumeni (1978 – 1996) (name changed from ELOC to ELCIN in 1984)

Presiding Bishops of ELCIN

- Kleopas Dumeni (1996 – 2000), consecrated 1978
- Apollos Kaulinge (2000 – 2004), consecrated 1996 for Western Diocese
- Tomas Shivute (2004 – 2012), consecrated 2000 for Western Diocese
- Shekutaamba Nambala, (2012 – 2022), consecrated 2012 for Western Diocese
- Gideon Niitenge consecrated 2022 until the present for Eastern Diocese

== Okahao controversy ==
Between 2012 and 2014, the Bishop of the Western Diocese was Josafat Shanghala. Shanghala attempted to move the parish pastor at Okahao, the Rev Hulda Shau-Aitana, to the parish of Okambebe. The pastor refused to move, claiming that the relocation was not for pastoral reasons, but rather a personal punishment. The issue became highly divisive within the church, and high-profile within Namibian news media.

In October 2013, parishioners at Okahao petitioned Presiding Bishop Shekutaamba Nambala to have Shanghala removed from office. The Presiding Bishop attempted to intervene, and appointed two separate commissions to report on the growing public controversy, but the results of both commissions were rejected by the parish. The Presiding Bishop ultimately appeared to side with the parish authorities, leading to concerns being expressed for the future unity of the church.

On 9 February 2014, Shanghala attempted to visit Okahao parish to preach at the Sunday morning service, but he was prevented from speaking by the congregation, who heckled him in the pulpit, and then ejected him from the church.

The controversy was terminated when Shanghala retired in June 2014, aged 70. His retirement ceremony was attended by dignitaries of church and state, including the Namibian Prime Minister. Shanghala was succeeded as Bishop of the Western Diocese by Veikko Munyika.

== Affiliations ==
ELCIN participates actively in ecumenical work through its affiliation with:

- Lutheran World Federation
  - Lutheran Communion in Southern Africa
- United Church Council: Namibia Evangelical Lutheran Churches
- Council of Churches in Namibia
- World Council of Churches

== See also ==
- Religion in Namibia
- List of Lutheran dioceses and archdioceses
