= Mapumulo =

- Location within KwaZulu-Natal Location within South Africa
- Coordinates: 30.054°S 30.772°E
- Country: South Africa
- Province: KwaZulu-Natal
- Municipality: eThekwini

Area
  - Total: 44.86 km^{2} (17.32 sq mi)

Population (2001)
  - Total: 6,200
  - Density: 140/km^{2} (360/sq mi)

Racial makeup (2001)
  - Black African: 100.0%

First languages (2001)
  - Zulu: 99.3%
  - Other: 0.7%
- Time zone: UTC+2 (SAST)
- PO box: 4470
- Area code: 032

Mapumulo is a town in eThekwini Metropolitan Municipality in the KwaZulu-Natal province of South Africa.

== People from Mapumulo ==
- Massabalala Yengwa - lawyer, anti-apartheid activist and the Natal Provincial Secretary of the African National Congress Youth League (ANCYL).
