= Outapi =

Town in northern Namibia

Outapi Ombalantu
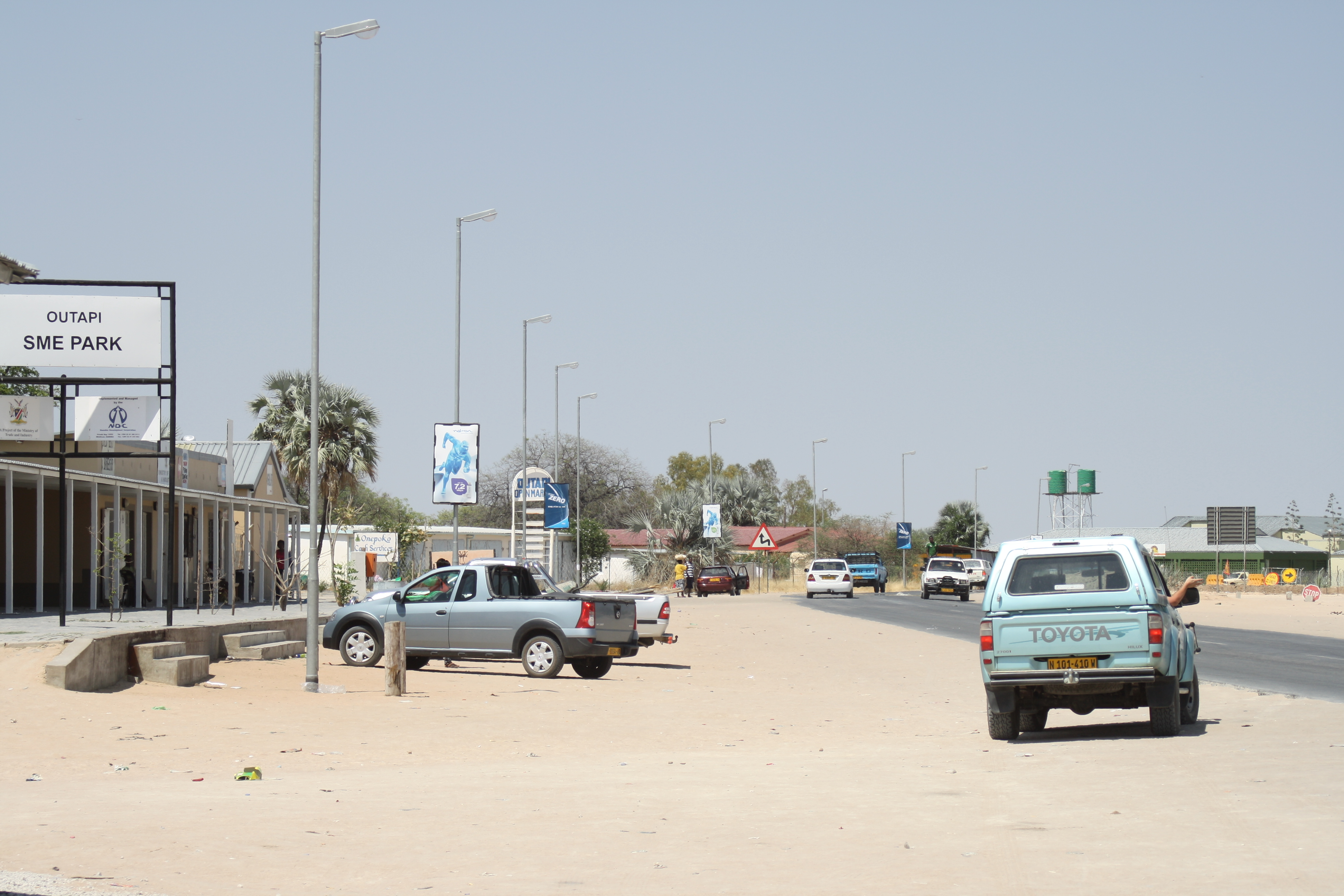
- Main street in Outapi

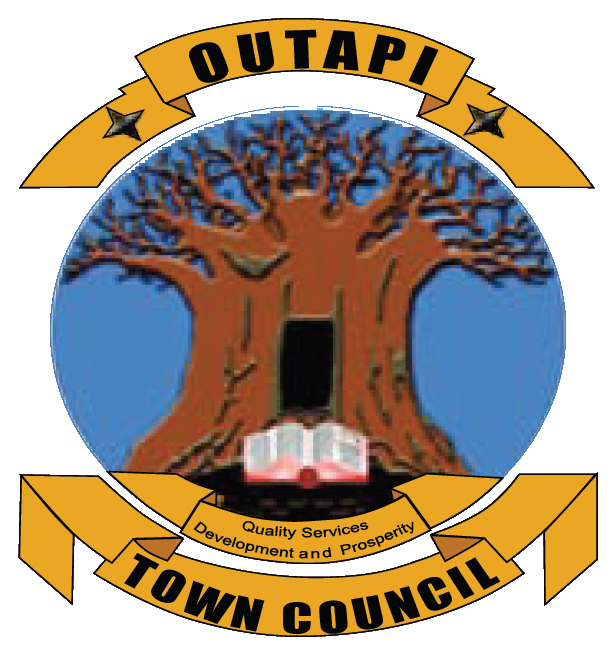
- Seal

- Location in Namibia
- Coordinates: 17°30′16″S 14°59′05″E
- Country: Namibia
- Region: Omusati Region

Government
  - Type: Municipal council
  - Mayor: Selma Asino

Area
  - Total: 10.7 sq mi (27.7 km^{2})

Population (2023)
  - Total: 13,664
  - Density: 1,280/sq mi (493/km^{2})
- Time zone: UTC+2 (SAST)
- Climate: BSh

Outapi wa Nakafingo na Temba, well known as Outapi or Uutapi and Ombalantu, is a town in northern Namibia near the border with Angola, situated 90 km (56 mi) northwest of Oshakati. It is the capital of the Omusati region and the district capital of the Outapi electoral constituency. It had a population of 13,664 people in 2023. The language spoken there is Oshiwambo.

== Geography ==
The town normally receives an annual average rainfall of 440 millimetres (17 in), although in the 2010/2011 rainy season 723 millimetres (28.5 in) were measured.

Historical population
Year	Pop.	±% p.a.
2001	2,640	—
2011	6,437	+9.32%
2023	13,664	+6.47%

== Economy and infrastructure ==
In 2001, Outapi was the smallest town in Namibia, with a population of just over 2,600. It is, however, developing rapidly. There is a large number of newly constructed government buildings and shops in the south of the town. The town features several schools, a community hall, a hospital and a police station. There are two open markets, one at the Ombalantu baobab tree and one at Onhimbu. There is also a tourist lodge.

== Culture and tourism ==
Within the former South African Army base is the famous Omukwa Ombalantu baobab tree, a baobab whose huge hollow trunk has been used in the past as a post office, a chapel, and a coffee shop, and now houses a craft shop.

The town hosts the annual Olufuko Festival, which was initiated in 2012. The festival is a combination of a business expo and cultural celebrations, of which the initiation ceremony that prepares teenage girls for womanhood is the heart of the festival. Namibia's first president and founding father, Sam Nujoma, is the patron of the Olufuko Festival.

== Politics ==
Outapi is governed by a town council that has seven seats. Omusati Region, to which Outapi belongs, is a stronghold of Namibia's ruling SWAPO party. For the 2015 local authority election no opposition party nominated a candidate, and SWAPO won all seven seats uncontested.

SWAPO also won the 2020 local authority election. It obtained 721 votes and gained five seats. The Independent Patriots for Change (IPC), an opposition party formed in August 2020, obtained 357 votes and gained the remaining two seats. Selma Asino is mayor of Outapi.
