= Ongwediva =

Town in northern Namibia

- Town
- Nickname: The Valley of the Leopard
- Motto(s): Freedom & Hard Work
- Location in Namibia
- Coordinates: 17°46′18″S 15°45′51″E
- Country: Namibia
- Region: Oshana Region
- constituency: Ongwediva Constituency
- Proclaimed: 1992

Government
  - Mayor: Tarah Shalyefu

Area
  - Total: 16.1 sq mi (41.8 km^{2})

Population (2023)
  - Total: 33,777
  - Density: 2,090/sq mi (808/km^{2})
- Time zone: UTC+2 (SAST)
- Climate: BSh
- Website: http://www.otc.com.na/

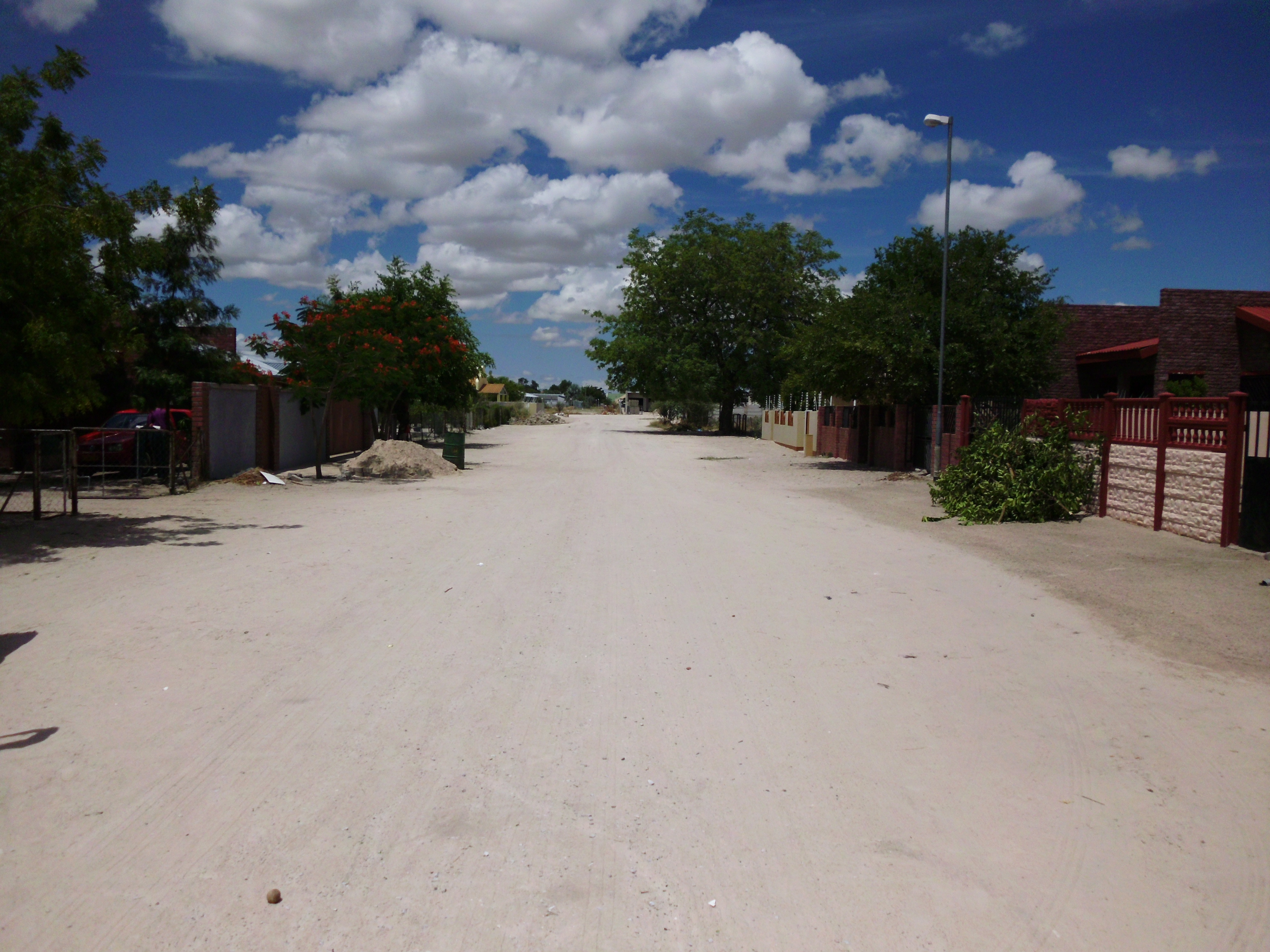
Ongwediva residential neighborhood

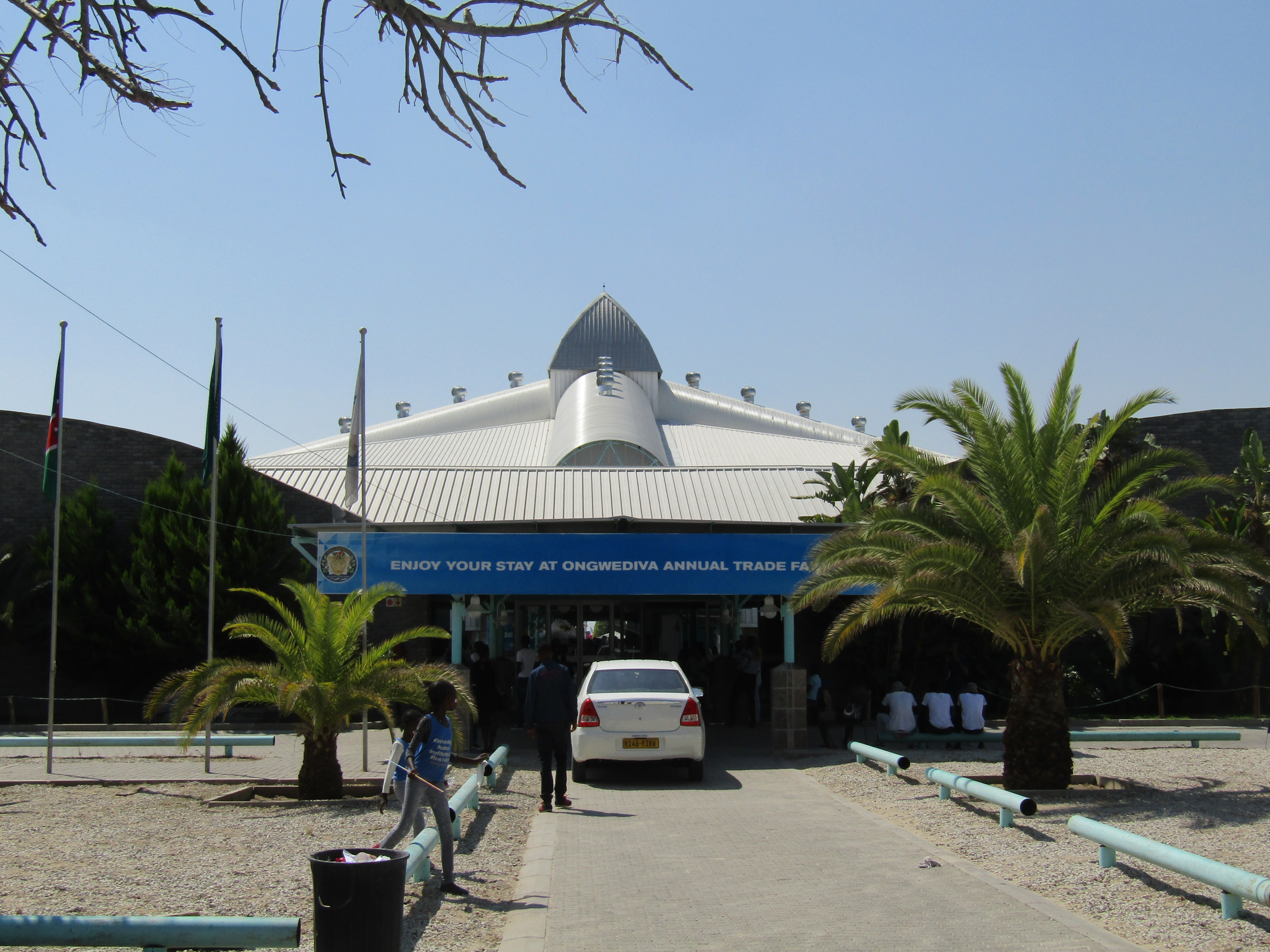
Queens Hall, Ongwediva fairgrounds on the B1 road

Ongwediva is a town in the Oshana Region in the north of Namibia. It is the district capital of the Ongwediva electoral constituency. As of 2023 it had 33,777 inhabitants and covered 4,102 hectares of land. Ongwediva has seven churches. Most of the inhabitants speak Oshiwambo.

== History ==
Ongwediwa started as a Finnish mission station in 1926. A school for male students was built there at the time, focusing on practical skills. It is talked about as an agricultural and industrial school, although the agricultural emphasis soon faded away. The school started in February 1927, and it was a secondary school, which one could attend after completing primary school. Towards the end of the 1920s, the school started to receive subsidies from the South African government, although this was only a modest £100 per year.

The male teacher training seminary was transferred from Oniipa to Ongwediva at the end of 1954. It continues today as part of the Faculty of Education of the University of Namibia.

The civilian settlement of Ongwediva was established in the 1960s while Namibia was under South African occupation, in the area of headman Mr Nandjebo Mengela. Its purpose was to serve as a residential area for people employed by businesses and government in Oshakati and Ondangwa.

== Economy and development ==
Ongwediva hosts an annual trade fair, the Ongwediva Annual Trade Fair (OATF), since 2000, after one initial trade fair, the Northern Namibia Trade Fair, was held in 1995. Opposite the open market, there is a shopping mall (Maroela Mall, Mandume Ndemufayo St.).

Ongwediva is an urban area that experiences rapid growth.

Historical population
Year	Pop.	±% p.a.
2001	10,742	—
2011	20,260	+6.55%
2023	33,777	+4.35%

Ongwediva is the second largest entertainment town in Namibia, just behind the capital, Windhoek. Ongwediva is a fast-growing town in terms of development, and it also features one of the few private hospitals in Namibia. The Miss Namibia 2025 also took place in Ongwediva.

== Politics ==
Ongwediva is governed by a town council that has seven seats.

Oshana Region, to which Ongwediva belongs, is a stronghold of Namibia's ruling SWAPO party. It won the first local election run after Namibian independence, the 1992 local elections, by a landslide, winning 1,756 votes and all seven council seats. The Democratic Turnhalle Alliance (DTA) came distant second with 97 votes. It failed to gain a seat. The 1998 local authority elections saw a similar result. SWAPO gained six seats (757 votes), DTA gained one seat with 107 votes.

In the 2015 local authority election, SWAPO won by a landslide (2,264 votes) and gained all seven council seats. The Rally for Democracy and Progress (RDP) also ran but gained only 166 votes. SWAPO also won the 2020 local authority election. It obtained 1,681 votes and gained four seats. The Independent Patriots for Change (IPC), an opposition party formed in August 2020, obtained 952 votes and gained three seats.

=== Mayors ===
- Patricia Kashuupulwa (2010)
- Taarah Shalyefu (current)

== Education ==
There are currently only two high schools in Ongwediva, Mweshipandeka High School and Gabriel Taapopi SSS. There are also five primary schools. The newly created Faculty of Engineering and Information Technology of the University of Namibia is based in Ongwediva and started its first official academic year in 2009. The José Eduardo dos Santos Campus is by far the largest physical development in Ongwediva. The Campus has already been described by the Namibian press as a Star in the North. There was also an educational college for teachers.

== Notable residents ==
- Benjamin Hauwanga, businessman, owner of Bennies Entertainment Park and Lodge, and the BH Group of Companies
- Sunny Boy, a hip-hop and kwaito musician
- Erastus Uutoni, politician and former mayor of the town
- Benson Shilongois, football player for the Namibian national team.

== Gallery ==
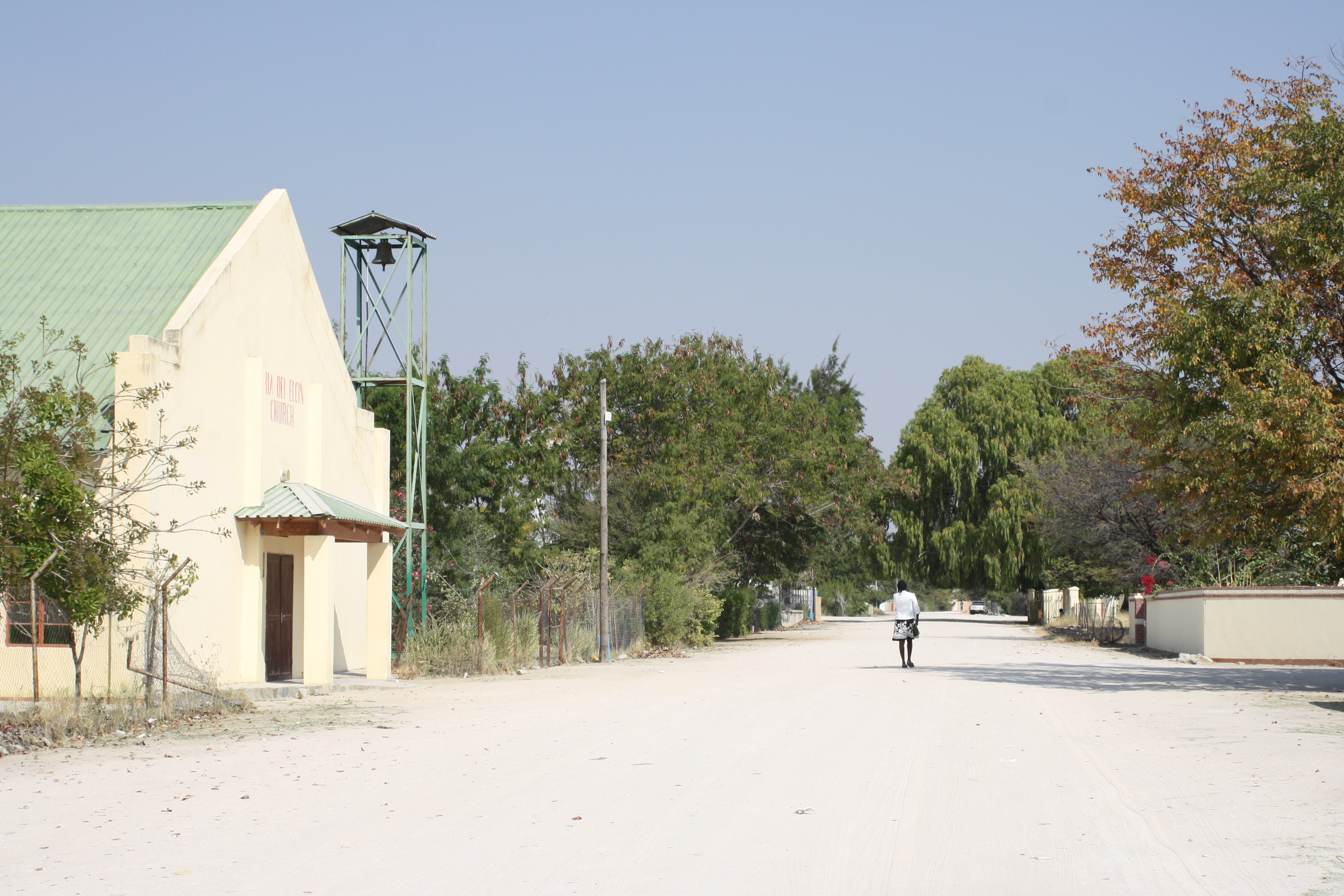
ELCIN church

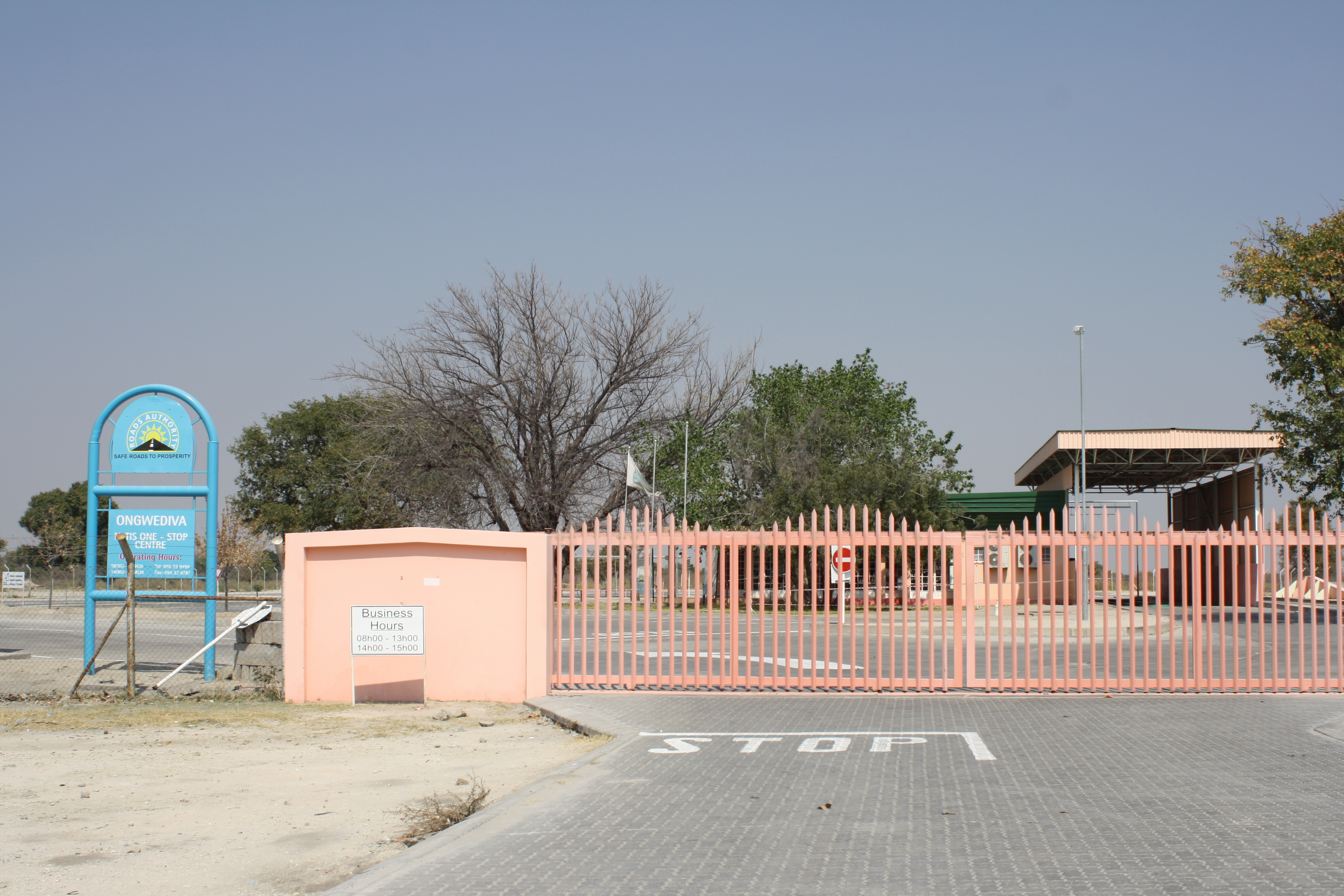
Road Authority office

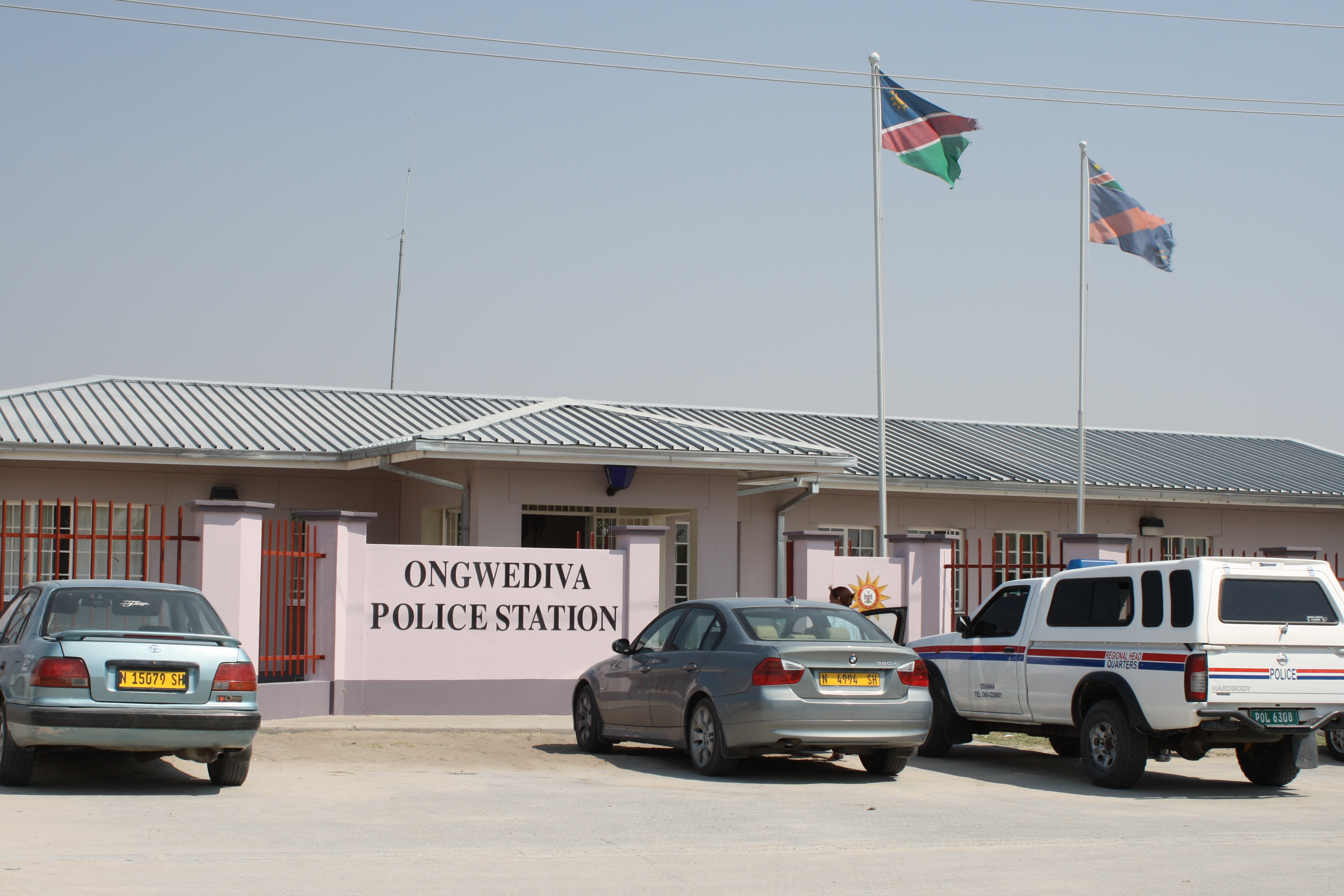
Police station

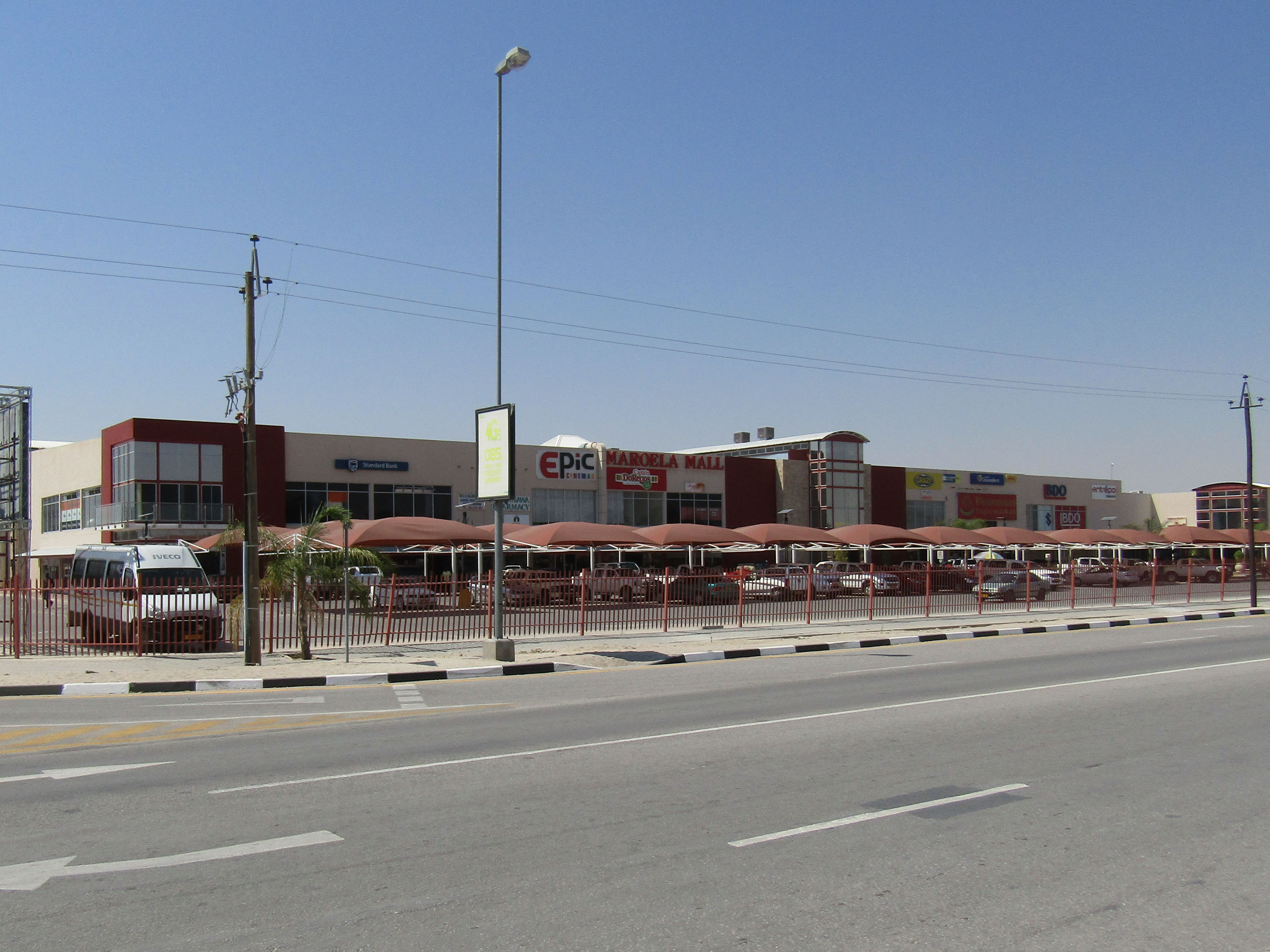
Shopping Center Maroela Mall in Ongwediva, Namibia

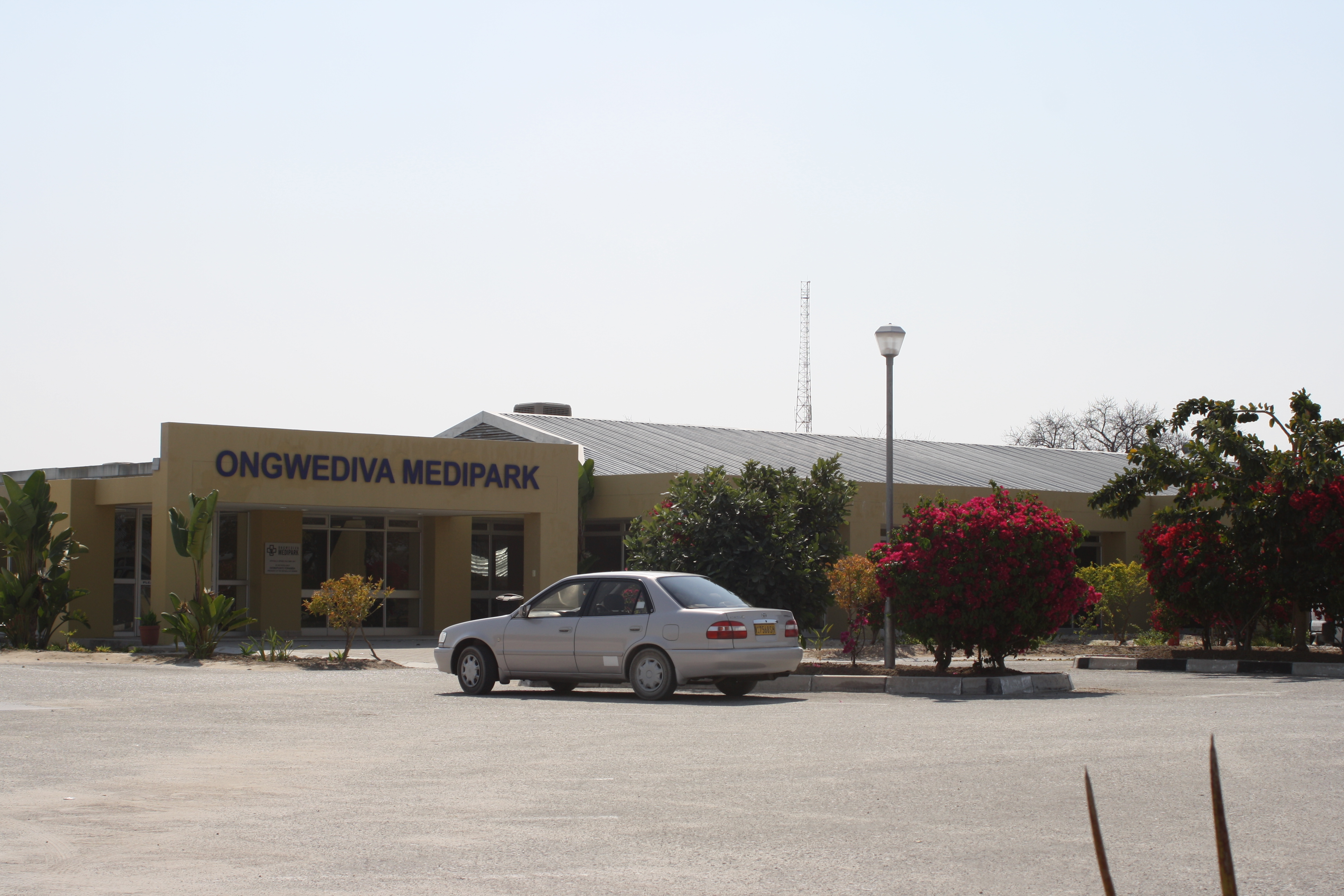
Private hospital

== Sources ==
- Peltola, Matti (1958). Sata vuotta suomalaista lähetystyötä 1859–1959. II: Suomen Lähetysseuran Afrikan työn historia [‘One Hundred Years of Finnish Missionary Work 1859–1959. II: The History of FMS’s Missionary Work in Africa’]. Helsinki: The Finnish Missionary Society. p. 91.
