= Oniipa =

- Town
- Location in Namibia
- Coordinates: 17°55′00″S 16°02′00″E
- Country: Namibia
- Region: Oshikoto Region
- Constituency: Oniipa
- Proclaimed town: 2015

Government
  - Mayor: Jafet Augustus

Area
  - Total: 5.6 sq mi (14.5 km^{2})
- Elevation: 3,524 ft (1,074 m)

Population (2023 census)
  - Total: 4,740
  - Density: 847/sq mi (327/km^{2})
- Time zone: UTC+2 (SAST)
- Climate: BSh

Oniipa is a town in the Oshikoto Region of northern Namibia and the district capital of the Oniipa electoral constituency. It had 4,740 inhabitants in 2023.

== Geography ==
Oniipa is situated just outside Ondangwa. In 2014, the area around Oniipa was declared the Onethindi-Oniipa Settlement Area. Parts of Onethindi were incorporated in 2015.

Historical population
Year	Pop.	±% p.a.
2011	3,882	—
2023	4,740	+1.68%

== History ==
Oniipa was established in 1872 by the Finnish Missionary Society.

During the war for independence of the country, Evangelical Lutheran Ovambo-Kavango (ELOC) Printing Press shop was burnt down by the Boers.

== Economy and infrastructure ==
75% of Oniipa's residents have access to clean drinking water.

The old church hospital, Onandjokwe State Hospital is situated in Oniipa. It is named after black birds locally known as oondjohwi, living in a nearby valley. Today, the hospital is managed by the Government of Namibia.

Oniipa Training School, a teacher training school founded in 1913, is situated in town.

=== Tourism ===
Onandjokwe State Hospital houses Namibia's only medical museum. Owing to its connections to Finnish culture, Oniipa operates Namibia's only public sauna. Nakambale Museum, named after the nickname of Martti Rautanen, is situated in town.

== Politics ==
Oniipa was proclaimed a town in 2015. Since then is governed by a town council that has seven seats.

Oshikoto Region, to which Oniipa belongs, is a stronghold of Namibia's ruling SWAPO party. For the 2015 local authority election no opposition party nominated a candidate, and SWAPO won uncontested. SWAPO only narrowly won the 2020 local authority election. It obtained 733 votes and gained four seats. The Independent Patriots for Change (IPC), an opposition party formed in August 2020, obtained 673 votes and gained three seats.

== Notable people ==
- Michael Amushelelo (born 1991), social activist, politician and a businessman
- It is the hometown of former Lutheran bishop and liberation leader Leonard Auala.
