= Paulus Hamutenya =

Haufiku Paulus Hamutenya (born c. 1884, Oukwanyama, Angola — died 12 September 1932) was one of the first seven Ovambos to be ordained a pastor in Oniipa, Ovamboland, in 1925 by the director of the Finnish Missionary Society, Matti Tarkkanen.

Hamutenya was the son of Hamutenya gwaNghililewanga and Ndayapi yaKavengula. He was born c. 1884 and baptized in 1919 in Onandjokwe.

Hamutenya belonged to the Oukwanyama tribe. Peltola says that he had formerly been "a man of great power". He seems to have come to contact with Christianity through the Rhenish Mission's work in Ondjiva in present-day Angola, and in the aftermath of World War I, when the Germans were told to leave Angola, Hamutenya with many other Ovakwanyama people emigrated to South West Africa. Once there, he built a church in his home village of Edundja, completed in 1922, i.e. two years before his ordination.

In 1922, Hamutenya began his studies in the Oniipa seminary. Another man from Ondjiva, Simson Shituwa also began his studies there at the same time. Shituwa was also among the first seven Ovambos to be ordained into priesthood in 1925.

After the ordination, Hamutenya returned to Oukwanyama and worked in Edundja during 1935–29, but when Edundja became crowded with more émigrés from Angola, he founded a new place for the Oukwanyama people in the woods of eastern Oukwanyma, 60 km east of Engela, in an area into which his tribesmen had begun to move, especially from Angola. The new place was called Eenhana ([ɛːˈn̥ana]), and it was founded around New Year's in 1930. The South West African government put Hamutenya in charge of Eastern Oukwanyama.

In 1932, Hamutenya built a church in Eenhana, but he died the same year after a short illness. "If I can only die working for the Lord, the rest does not matter", were words that Hamutenya said before his death.

In 1936, Eenhana became a mission station of the Finnish Missionary Society, as nurse Linda Helenius moved there and started a clinic.

Hamutenya was married to Emma lyaNangonya in 1920, and had two sons and two daughters with her.

== Sources ==
- Peltola, Matti (1958). Sata vuotta suomalaista lähetystyötä 1859–1959. II: Suomen Lähetysseuran Afrikan työn historia [One Hundred Years of Finnish Missionary Work 1859–1959. II: The History of FMS's Missionary Work in Africa]. Helsinki: The Finnish Missionary Society.

== Further information ==
- Linda Helenius (1942). 'Sillä pimeys katoaa ...': ambopastori Paulus Hamutenjan elämästä ja evankeliumin leviämisestä Uukuanjamaassa ['For the darkness shall go away...': On the life of the Ovambo pastor Paulus Hamutenya and the spreading of the Gospel in Oukwanyama] (in Finnish). Helsinki: Finnish Missionary Society.
