= Simson Shituwa =

Simson Teteinge Haivela Shituwa (b. ca. 1871 Oilambo, Oukwanyama, Angola — died 30 January 1969) was one of the first seven Ovambo pastors, whom the director of the Finnish Missionary Society, Matti Tarkkanen ordained into priesthood in Oniipa, Ovamboland, on 27 September 1925, with a permission granted by the Bishop of Tampere, Jaakko Gummerus.

Shituwa was born ca 1871 the son of Shituwa shaHaivela and Namutenya. He was baptized by German missionaries on 16 March 1902. He went to the Oniipa seminary during 1922–25.

He worked in Endola during 1925–40 and 1945–1969 and in Eenhana during 1941–44.

Shituwa was a local man of great influence in Oukwanyama, and many government officials in South West Africa consulted him on a number of occasions. He seems to have converted into Christianity in Ondjiva, as the result of the missionary work of the German Rhenish Missionary Society.

Shituwa was a cripple, but even as such, it was said that he was “stronger than his ancient namesake. This Samson did not have his power in his hair or his muscles, but in his heart, in which God dwelled.”

When the Germans had to leave their missions in Angola as the result of World War I, Shituwa moved to South West Africa. From that time on, even before he was ordained, he was one of the pillars of the church in Oukwanyama. Shituwa took care of the western parts of southern Oukwanyama, while Wilhelm Kafita took care of the eastern parts. Apparently they worked on both sides of the international border. The Finnish Missionary Society founded its first mission station, Engela, in this area only in 1921.

In 1918 Shituwa met a Roman Catholic missionary in Omafo near the border. The priest had appeared there and wanted to baptize people. Shituwa was hesitant, and when the Catholic father wanted a pound for each person baptized, it was easy for Shituwa to reject the proposal. The father had to move on, empty handed.

In 1921 Shituwa assisted the Finnish missionary August Hänninen in the founding of the Engela mission station. He showed the place for the mission station a couple of kilometres west of Omafo, on the western bank of an oshana, in a place that was a bit higher than the surrounding landscape.

In 1922, Shituwa started his studies in the Oniipa seminary, in the class for theological studies. When he had been ordained, he worked as a pastor in his home area in Endola, which formed a subordinate parish within the Engela parish, 30 km to the south-east of Engela. A church was built there in 1927. The parish register, however, remained in Engela.

In the late 1950s, Shituwa was still alive, and “despite his advanced age he had remained surprisingly active and still had a burning desire to serve the cause of the Gospel,” wrote Elias Pentti of him in 1958.

Shituwa was married three times, first to Katrina kaShikongo, then to Hulde yaAmiti, who died in 1921, and lastly to Miriam gaHamunyela in 1921. He had one daughter, Natalia Ndahambelela, with Hulde yaAmiti. Shituwa is named after a secondary school in Endola constituency called Shituwa secondary School. Its hostel was upgraded in 2020 and was officially opened in 2021

== Sources ==
- Peltola, Matti (1958). Sata vuotta suomalaista lähetystyötä 1859–1959. II: Suomen Lähetysseuran Afrikan työn historia [One Hundred Years of Finnish Missionary Work 1859–1959. II: The History of FMS's Missionary Work in Africa]. Helsinki: The Finnish Missionary Society.
- Pentti, Elias, ed. (1958). Ambomaa [Ovamboland]. Helsinki: Finnish Missionary Society.
