= Selma Rainio =

Finnish medical missionary

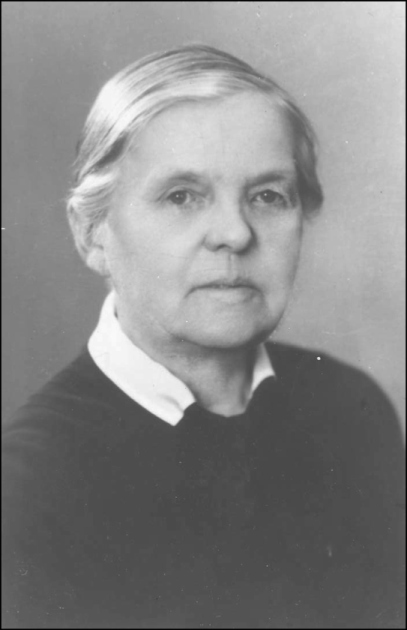
Selma Rainio.

Selma Rainio (until 1905 Lilius, 21 March 1873, Saarijärvi, Finland – 5 January 1939, Onandjokwe, South West Africa) was a Finnish missionary with the Finnish Missionary Society, the first Finnish medical missionary, who founded the Onandjokwe Hospital in the Ondonga tribal area in Ovamboland. She also worked in the Engela Hospital. In Ovamboland, she was known as Kuku Selma ‘grandmother Selma’.

== Early life and studies ==
Rainio was born in a Saarijärvi clergy house. Her parents were Chaplain Anton Lilius and Amanda Sofia Perden. Her father Anton represented the clergy in the Diet of Finland for four terms during 1872–1885.

Raino was one of 10 children. The total number of children was 14, but four of them died in infancy. One of the sisters was Lilli Rainio, who became known as collector of folklore and as an author.

Rainio studied in a private school for girls in Jyväskylä and was issued a diploma when she was 17. After finishing the school she returned home, where she took care of her father, who was paralyzed for the last three years of his life. While taking care of her father, she got the idea that she would study to be a doctor, even though there were no women doctors in Finland at the time. She matriculated from the Helsinki Co-educational School in the spring of 1896. While preparing for the matriculation, she lived together with her sister Lilli in the house of the widow of missionary Weikkolin. Ida Weikkolin told the sisters many a tale from the Ovamboland mission field. It was probably the stories of Mrs. Weikkolin that gave Rainio the incentive to volunteer for missionary work.

Rainio started her studies in the Helsinki University School of Medicine the same autumn. During her studies Rainio was active in the Häme Nation of the university, where she strove to get women equal rights. She also was active in delivering lectures on Finnish Nationalism and Russia's attempts to prevent Finland from gaining her independence. She also participated in the activities of the Women's Christian Association of Finland, which had been founded in 1897.

Towards the end of 1902, Rainio completed the theory section of her degree in medicine, and early the following year she started her internships in the hospitals of Helsinki. In early 1908, she graduated with a degree in medicine. Elina Ojala, who wrote a master's degree in church history on the life of Rainio, believes that Rainio felt the calling to become a medical missionary sometime during 1903–1905. Before departing for Africa, she studied in Hamburg, in the Institut für Tropenhygiene, and in Tübingen, in the Deutsches Institut für Ärztliche Mission.

== Rainio’s first term in Ovamboland 1908–1919 ==
Rainio arrived in Ovamboland on 14 December 1908. She started her work at the Oniipa mission station. Even during her first month there, she treated between 40 and 50 patients every day. She had no time to study the Oshindonga language, but had to ask other missionaries to interpret for her. When she arrived in Ovamboland, the area suffered from the great famine of 1907–08. During the first year, 7 525 patients were helped, which meant 25 patients per day on average. The number became smaller when a small fee began to be charged from the patients. On the other hand, the patients did not continue their treatments long enough. When the worst pains were over, they thought they were well again and hurried for work in the fields, especially the women.

In 1910, Rainio travelled to all the Finnish mission stations in the area. She paid particular attention to the eye diseases of the Ovambos and observed that midwives would be needed to help with childbirths. She would have wanted a horse for urgent home calls, but the board of trustees of the FMS thought it was too expensive to maintain such an animal.

=== Founding of the Onandjokwe Hospital ===
In January 1911, a hospital building was completed next to Oniipa. It had a corrugated metal roof, the first of its kind in Ovamboland. The building had living quarters, and a combined polyclinic and pharmacy in one room, another room for the necessary operations, and a room for missionary patients. The Ovambos were cared for in huts, of which there were first eight and more were built later. The hospital was inaugurated in a mission feast held in July 1911. The inauguration was performed by the assistant director of the FMS, Rev. Hannu Haahti together with the head of the mission in Ovamboland, Rev. Martti Rautanen. The hospital was called Onandjokwe, ‘the place of wild geese’.

During the same dry season, the first trained nurses arrived there, Karin Hirn in August and Ida Ålander in August. The latter had spent some time in Windhoek getting familiar in the work of a midwife. Also two Ovambo evangelists were hired, and they took care of preaching the Gospel to the patients.

During the inspection trip of Rev. Haahti, Rainio was able to achieve a breakthrough for the medical mission: during the inspection meetings were held about the Finnish missionary work, and Rainio was allowed to write preliminary thoughts on the medical work, and the decisions were taken on the basis of her thoughts.

In 1913 Rainio made a so-called “health trip” to the Cape. She was now able to make a recommendation to the FMS, on the basis of her own experiences, that all missionaries be granted the possibility to make such trips. In addition to the healthy oceanic climate, the benefits of the Cape included a possibility to participate in cultural activities. The missionaries had wanted to make such trips before, but only now, when a medical doctor recommended them, the board of the FMS could not ignore these wishes.

=== Problems on the mission field ===
In the early years, the female missionaries encountered a number of problems. The worst of them was the so-called meeting of the brethren, in which women could not participate. In addition to this, the women were allowed to read the annual reports of the mission field only after they had been printed in Helsinki and shipped back to Africa. Rainio began women's missionary meetings, but these came to a halt after only a year. However, during the visit of Rev. Haahti, general meetings of the missionaries were held in Ovamboland, and this then became the practice on the mission field.

It could also be observed that the salaries of the women were quite inferior to those of the men.

The relationship between the missionaries and the board of trustees of the FMS were strained, mainly because the board chose to believe in all kinds of rumours and did not make attempts to find out what was going on in the mission field. Rainio also was perplexed about the fact that the missionaries were not allowed to write in public about the tightening grip of the German Reich on Ovamboland. This was due to the fact that Germany and Russia had become more and more hostile towards each other during the years leading up to World War I, but this was not known to the missionaries.

Rainio also thought that the Finns could have had more beneficial attitudes towards the Ovambos. It had been wrong of the Finns to demand that the Ovambos dress in a European manner. On the other hand, when this change had been achieved, the FMS wanted to stop sending clothes to them. Rainio asked her sister Lilli to instruct the sowing societies and friends of the mission to keep on sending clothes to Ovamboland.

The missionaries were not interested in the customs and thoughts of the Ovambos. This led to some of the old customs falling into oblivion, including some that in Rainio's opinion would have been worth keeping.

=== Consequences of the Great War ===
As a consequence of World War I, the connections between Finland and Ovamboland were cut off for nearly 18 months. For example, in the beginning of 1916, none the salaries of the previous year had been paid to the Finnish missionaries. Also the food aid from the German Colonial Government to the Onandjokwe Hospital had ended soon after the outbreak of the war, and then the South African troops soon seized the control of the country.

In March 1915, the hospital had to be closed for some time, as it had run out of groceries, and it was difficult to find people to work for the hospital among the Ovambos. The food stuffs that Rainio had brought with her the year before had lasted until then.

Among the Ovambos, various illnesses, such as the beriberi became common. Also bacterial infections became common in the hospital. In December 1915 the hospital had to be closed, because the patients began to die one after another. However, the polyclinic continued its operation. The hospital work could only be continued when the infected patient huts had been demolished and new ones had been built to replace them.

In 1915 several Finns were also among the patients, and likewise the head of the English government, Major Pritchard. Thanks to the latter, the new government soon began to issue foodstuffs to the hospital.

=== Rainio falls ill ===
In 1917, Rainio fell seriously ill. She left to accompany another Finn taken ill, Miss Selma Santalahti, to Swakopmund. When they arrived there, it turned out that Rainio was more seriously ill than Santalahti. She was weak because e.g. malaria. However, good sustenance and a recuperation period of five weeks restored her energies. Even though a heart condition was also diagnosed, which had long been bothering her, she was able to return to Ovamboland in May 1918.

=== New diseases in Ovamboland ===
Now some diseases appeared in Ovamboland that had not been known there before. These were chickenpox, measles, meningitis, and mumps. The Spanish flu, however, arrived in Ovamboland only in late 1919, and it had been weakened to the degree that it caused no deaths there.

The prejudices of the Ovambos towards the hospital had now lessened. For example, they allowed themselves to be carried to the hospital on stretchers. Earlier they had taken this as a sign of an inevitable death. Neither did they leave the hospital when someone died there.

== The first furlough in Finland 1919–1922 ==
In July 1919, Rainio left for a furlough in Finland. She left Onandjokwe in the hands of Aatu Järvinen. He had arrived on the field in 1917 and had received some medical training in Tübingen.

In Finland, Rainio spent some time in Helsinki organizing things to do with the medical mission in Ovamboland. After that she spent some time with her mother in Saarijärvi, and then returned to Helsinki. In Helsinki, she held lectures in various places, with Africa as her topic. In June 1920, she worked in the Kivelä Hospital in Helsinki, and then she travelled to Tübingen to learn the latest developments in tropical diseases. Even there she lectured on her work in Ovamboland, as requested by the head of the institute, Professor Gottlieb Olpp. In early 1921 Rainio worked for three months as the municipal doctor of Övermark in Ostrobothnia. She also worked in Keuruu and Sulkava. She did not want to return to Africa, because the FMS had made cuts on the budget of Onandjokwe. However, she changed her decision, although she did not appear to be excited about the matter. Her decision was affected by the fact that the missionaries in Ovamboland were tired and there were too few of them for the tasks on hand. Also her own health had become better.

== The Second term in 1922–33 ==
Rainio left for Africa again in July 1922, together with Karin Hirn and Karin Lönnberg. She arrived in Ovamboland in September. While in Widnhoek, she agreed to work for the government as the district physician of Ovamboland. For this, she had to treat all the venereal diseases of the territory. She was to be paid 100 pounds, which she did not consider an adequate compensation. The job entailed a lot of bureaucratic work, mainly a lot of writing of reports, which had to be written in English, which the Finnish missionaries did not know much. The Onandjokwe Hospital was becoming more and more dependent on the financial aid of the government, for which reason Rainio did not want to turn down the offer to work as the district physician.

At Onandjokwe she was assisted by nurse Karin Hirn along with Karin Lönnberg. Some new diseases now made their way to Ovamboland. These included tuberculosis and Malta fever, along with leprosy which arrived in 1926 and anthrax in 1927. The Ovambos usually died if they contracted the latter, especially if they tried to treat the patients themselves. However, when treated by the missionaries, they usually recovered.

In March 1923, Rainio's 50th birthday was celebrated in Ovamboland. At that time she tried to persuade her sisters to come and visit her, but to no avail. During that year, 571 patients were treated in the hospital, and more than 7 000 persons got help from the polyclinic. In 1924 these figures were somewhat lower and mortality was higher, because an influenza arrived from the south, where in the mines of Lüderitz 400 Ovambos died of this disease. Patients now began to avoid Onandjokwe so that they would not catch the disease.

During 1927, Rainio herself fell ill. Her one ear had been deaf from the age of 10 as a result of scarlet fever, and now the other ear was infected and she temporarily lost hearing in it as well. Then she fell ill with erysipelas in the skin of her head, and she feared she would die, as no treatment was known for the disease at the time. However, she recovered from both illnesses.

In 1928, the government increased its annual aid to Onandjokwe to 300 pounds per year.

In the 1920s, the medical care provided by Finns in Ovamboland expanded to other mission stations. Nurse Linda Helenius started small-scale hospital work in Engela, and Aatu Järvinen had founded a small hospital in Uukwaluudhi soon after Rainio had returned to Onandjokwe. The Anglican mission sent a doctor to Ovamboland in 1927, which eased Rainio's work load. The Anglican doctor probably worked at St Mary's in Odibo, which had been founded in 1924.

In 1929 Rainio was able to make a “health trip” again, after many years, to the Cape, and during it she was able to visit the Enjamana leprosy sanatorium and acquaint herself with the work done there.

In 1930, Rainio fell ill again with erysipelas in her head, and she also suffered from serious attacks of malaria, but again she recovered from both illnesses. She spent some time early in 1931 recuperating in Swakopmund.

During 1930 the Finns began to train Ovambo women to be nurses. Instruction was given by Karin Hirn. The first Ovambo nurses graduated in 1935.

The relationship between the Finnish missionaries and the government became strained in the 1920s, when the government gave false information on the Finnish medical work to the League of Nations Permanent Mandates Commission. Mission director Matti Tarkkanen wrote a long report to the League of Nations, after which the government corrected its statements in 1931.

In 1932, the South West African government was waging war against Iipumbu, king of Uukwambi, and in the end forced him into exile in Kavango. This conflict had the effect that the number of patients at Onandjokwe decreased considerably.

During the last years of the 1920s Rainio expected that the FMS would send a second doctor to Ovamboland, either a Finn or a German one, as some Germans had offered to go to Ovamboland. However, the Finns changed their minds and for some reason the FMS would not agree to send a German doctor there. Only in 1932, freshly graduated doctor Anni Melander, who was also familiar with surgery, was sent to Ovamboland.

During 1928–31 there was a great drought in Ovamboland. This resulted in the Ovambos eating rat meat, as they were accustomed to do during famines. However, this led to an epidemic of the plague. The disease spread even in the hospital, and in the end the Ovambos did not want to be treated there. The government imposed a quarantine on Ovamboland.

== Second furlough in Finland in 1933–36 ==
Anni Melander brought with her an invitation to Rainio from the board of the FMS for her to come back to Finland. Rainio would have wanted to remain in Ovamboland, in some more tranquil part of the area, because she knew she had fallen behind the development of medicine.

At the end of Rainio's second term, in 1933, there were 17 proper buildings in Onandjokwe, 49 patient huts and 15 storebuildings or shelters, and a mill.

Rainio left from Ondonga in May 1933, but at first she travelled round Kavango, where the FMS had begun work in 1926. She investigated the need for medical care in the area.

Rainio was elected to the board of trustees of the FMS in 1933. Her health was inspected in Helsinki, and in December that year she was operated on. No details of the operation are known. In early 1934 she began to travel in Finland, speaking about the Finnish medical mission in Ovamboland.

While in Finland, Rainio put finishing touches on an Oshindonga textbook on health and hygiene, which was intended to be used as the basis of nurse training in Ovamboland.

== Third term during 1936–39 ==
Rainio left for her last term in March 1936, when she was already well over 60. Mission director Uno Paunu had wanted to send her to Kavango, but possibly Rainio's views convinced him that eastern Oukwanyama would be a better place for her. She could have been stationed at Eenhana, but the Anglican Mission had demanded all of eastern Oukwanyama for itself. Thus Rainio was stationed at Engela, and Linda Helenius was sent to Eenhana. Apparently there were so many patients in Engela by this time, that medical work without a doctor had become difficult there. Between 50 and 100 patients came to the Engela Hospital every day, in addition to which there were 50–60 patients in the hospital huts. In addition to this, Rainio taught health and hygiene lessons in the local boys’ school, using books she had prepared herself.

In 1936 rabies appeared in Ovamboland. For the medical workers this was depressing, as there was no cure for those who were ill with it, and the patients were in great pains before the finally expired.

While in Engela, Rainio fell ill with severe fever in January 1936. Anni Melander went to Engela to take care of her. She was then transferred to Onandjokwe, and after the fever had subsided, she travelled to Swakopmund, where she slowly began to recuperate. In January 1937 she was able to return to Ovamboland.

In 1937 FMS Mission Director Uno Paunu visited Ovamboland. However, towards the end of his trip he fell ill, and was not able to travel to Engela and get acquainted with the medical work there. The number of patients in Engela now rivalled those of Onandjokwe. That year there were 683 patients at the Engela Hospital and 19 000 visits to the polyclinic. The staff of the Engela Hospital were naturally disappointed, when the mission director was not able to visit them.

In 1937, a new polyclinic building was built in Engela, with funds donated to this particular purpose. The building had five rooms. The following year a measles epidemic broke out in Ovamboland. More than 1 000 measles patients were treated in Engela, and many children died of this disease. Measles causes lots of complications, such as eye conditions, which increased the number of patients in Engela.

In early 1938 Rainio made a health trip to Swakopmund. Now it was found that a tumour that had been found in her lung the previous year, when she had been ill with fever, had grown bigger. Doctor Schwietering wanted to send Rainio to Finland because of this. He had diagnosed the tumour as being lung cancer, but it seems he did not communicate this to Rainio.

However, Rainio still returned to Engela and had new huts built for tuberculosis patients. In July she had to give up working. She now wanted to return to Finland, but in mid-August she was transferred to Onandjokwe to be treated there. On the last day of November she wrote her final letter to her relatives in Finland. On 5 January 1939 she died in Onandjokwe.

Rainio was buried at the Onandjokwe cemetery. All of the civil servants of Ovamboland were present, as well as a great many Ovambos. A memorial service was also held the Mission Church in Helsinki. Several newspapers in South West Africa and South Africa wrote articles about her after her death.

== Acknowledgements ==
In 1932 the State of Finland awarded her the Cross of Merit of the White Rose of Finland, and in 1935 the United Kingdom awarded her the King George V Silver Jubilee Medal. The League of Nations Permanent Mandates Commission gave her a posthumous award. in 1995, the Namibian postal service Nampost issued four stamps to commemorate the 125 years of Finnish missionary work. One of these stamps depicted Rainio. The other Finnish missionaries depicted were Martti Rautanen, Albin Savola, Karl August Weikkolin.

== Sources ==
- Elina Ojala (1990). Selma Rainio (1873–1939) Afrikan lääkärilähetyksen perustajana ja vaikuttajana Ambomaalla [‘Selma Rainio (1873–1939) as the founder of [Finnish] medical mission in Africa and as shaper of the mission work in Ovamboland’] (in Finnish). Master’s thesis in church history. Helsinki University.
- Peltola, Matti (1958). Sata vuotta suomalaista lähetystyötä 1859–1959. II: Suomen Lähetysseuran Afrikan työn historia [‘A Hundred Years of Finnish Missionary Work. 1859–1959. II: The FMS in Africa’] (in Finnish). Helsinki: Agricola-seura.
