= Eenhana =

Town in northern Namibia

- Location in Namibia
- Coordinates: 17°27′57″S 16°20′13″E
- Country: Namibia
- Region: Ohangwena Region
- Constituency: Eenhana Constituency

Government
  - Mayor: Omri-Onn Kavandje
  - Town Council CEO: Esco Tangeniomwene Ndahepele

Area
  - Total: 20.1 sq mi (52.0 km^{2})

Population (2023)
  - Total: 16,588
  - Density: 826/sq mi (319/km^{2})
- Time zone: UTC+2 (SAST)
- Climate: BSh

Eenhana (Kuanyama: calves, IPA: [ɛːˈn̥ana]) is the capital town of the Ohangwena Region, northern Namibia, on the border with Angola. It also used to be a mission station of the Finnish Missionary Society. It had a population of 16,588 people in 2023.

Eenhana is situated in a subtropical forest. It is connected to the road network and has a well-developed infrastructure. Due to the proximity of Angola, many businesses are situated here. The town hosts an annual trade fair.

== History ==
Eenhana was founded around New Year's Day 1930 by the Reverend Paulus Hamutenya. He was one of the first seven Ovambos to be ordained pastors in Oniipa, Ovamboland, in 1925 by the director of the Finnish Missionary Society, Matti Tarkkanen. The name Eenhana comes from the word calves in Oshikwanyama and is a reference to the calves that used to water at the small water pan where Eenhana is now located.

Hamutenya had earlier lived in Edundja, where he had built a church. However, the area became crowded, and he decided to found a new settlement for the Oukwanyama people in the woods, 60 kilometres (37 mi) to the east of Engela. Ovakwanyamas from Angola had already begun to move in that area. The South West African government made Hamutenya the local head of the tribesmen of Eastern Oukwanyama. In 1932, Hamutenya built a church in Eenhana. He died the same year after a short illness.

The Eenhana mission station was founded by the nurse Linda Helenius in 1936. Eenhana thus became the centre of medical care in Eastern Oukwanyama for several decades. Teacher Suoma Hirvonen soon joined Helenius on this new mission station.

Before Namibian independence it was a military centre of the South African Defence Force without public infrastructure. It was proclaimed a settlement in 1992, and a town in 1999.

== Economy and infrastructure ==
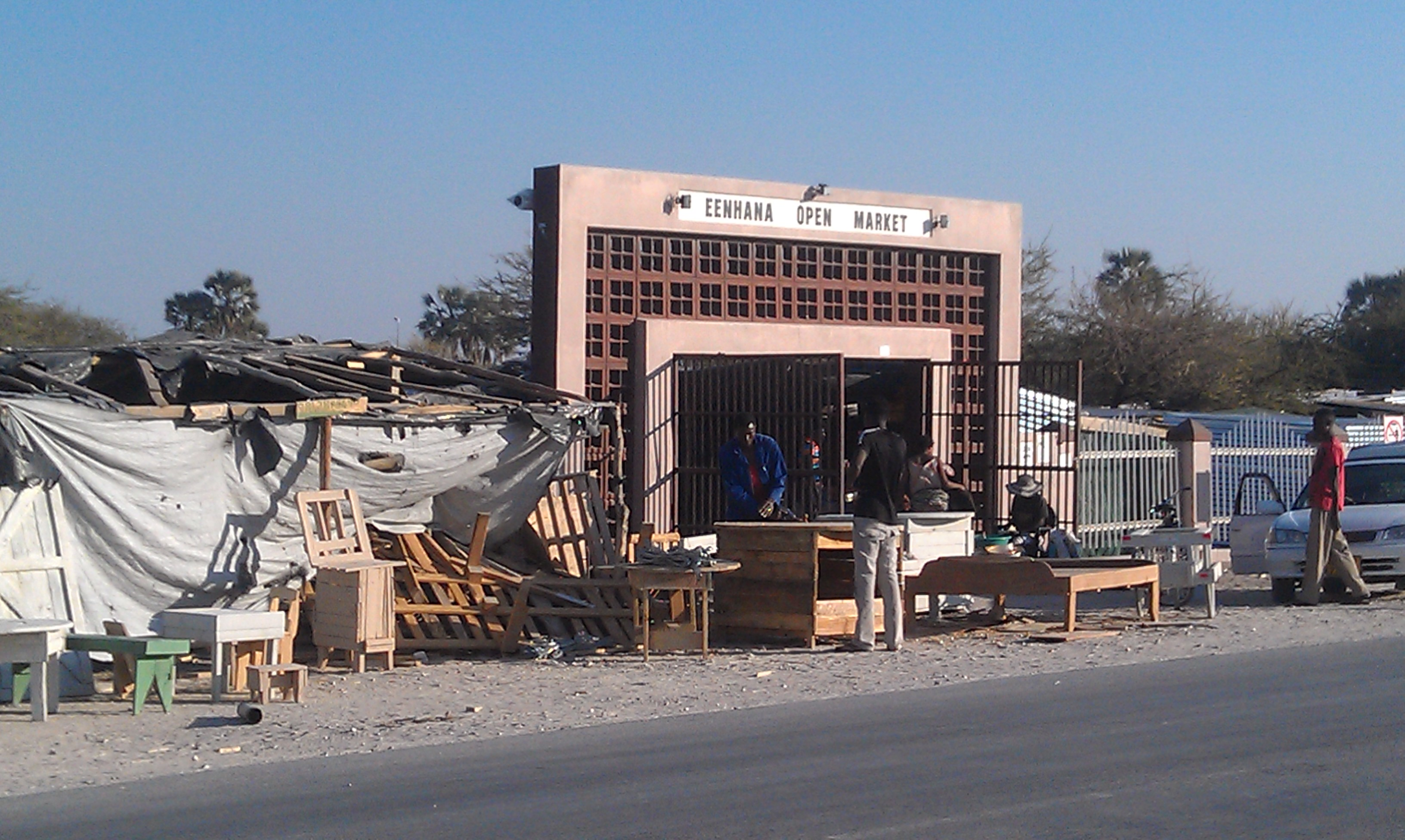
The entrance to Eenhana Open Market (circa 2013). This market no longer exists.

The town attempts to attract businesses to the town through business exhibitions, small and medium enterprises and tourism activities. Eenhana hosts two annual trade fairs, The Council-run Eenhana Trade and Business Expo since 2008, and the Eenhana Annual Youth Festival, inaugurated in 2019. The Town Council is investing into marketing activities directed at investors and is assisting business development by developing open markets and providing business skills.

== Geography ==
Climate data for Eenhana, Namibia
Month	Jan	Feb	Mar	Apr	May	Jun	Jul	Aug	Sep	Oct	Nov	Dec	Year
Daily mean °C (°F)	25.2 (77.4)	24.7 (76.5)	24.2 (75.6)	23.7 (74.7)	20.5 (68.9)	16.9 (62.4)	16.8 (62.2)	19.3 (66.7)	23.5 (74.3)	25.8 (78.4)	26.1 (79.0)	25.4 (77.7)	22.7 (72.9)
Average precipitation mm (inches)	125.1 (4.93)	133.3 (5.25)	113.5 (4.47)	48.7 (1.92)	9.1 (0.36)	0.2 (0.01)	0 (0)	0 (0)	1 (0.0)	14.2 (0.56)	58.1 (2.29)	86.8 (3.42)	590 (23.21)
Source: Deutscher Wetterdienst

Historical population
Year	Pop.	±% p.a.
2001	2,814	—
2011	5,528	+6.99%
2023	16,588	+9.59%

== Education ==
Eenhana is the home to six schools, three primary, one special school and two secondary:

- Eenhana Primary School
- Paulus Hamuntenya Primary School
- Haimbili Haufiku Secondary School
- Usko Nghaamwa Special School
- Eenhana Secondary School
- Nanhapo Primary School (the most recent of these schools)

Other education institutions include:

- The University of Namibia's Centre for External Studies
- Tate Institute of Technology
- Glowdom Educational Foundation
- NamCOL Centre
- Eenhana Vocational Training Centre

On the 10th March 2022, the Namibia University of Science and Technology (NUST) opened its satellite campus at Eenhana. The campus was officially opened by Prime Minister Saara Kuugongelwa - Amadhila.

On the 11 March 2025, the 5th International University of Management (IUM) campus was officially inaugurated in Eenhana. The campus was officially opened by the founder of IUM Professor David Namwandi. The campus is located along the Dr Sam Nujoma Road in Eenhana town.

== Politics ==
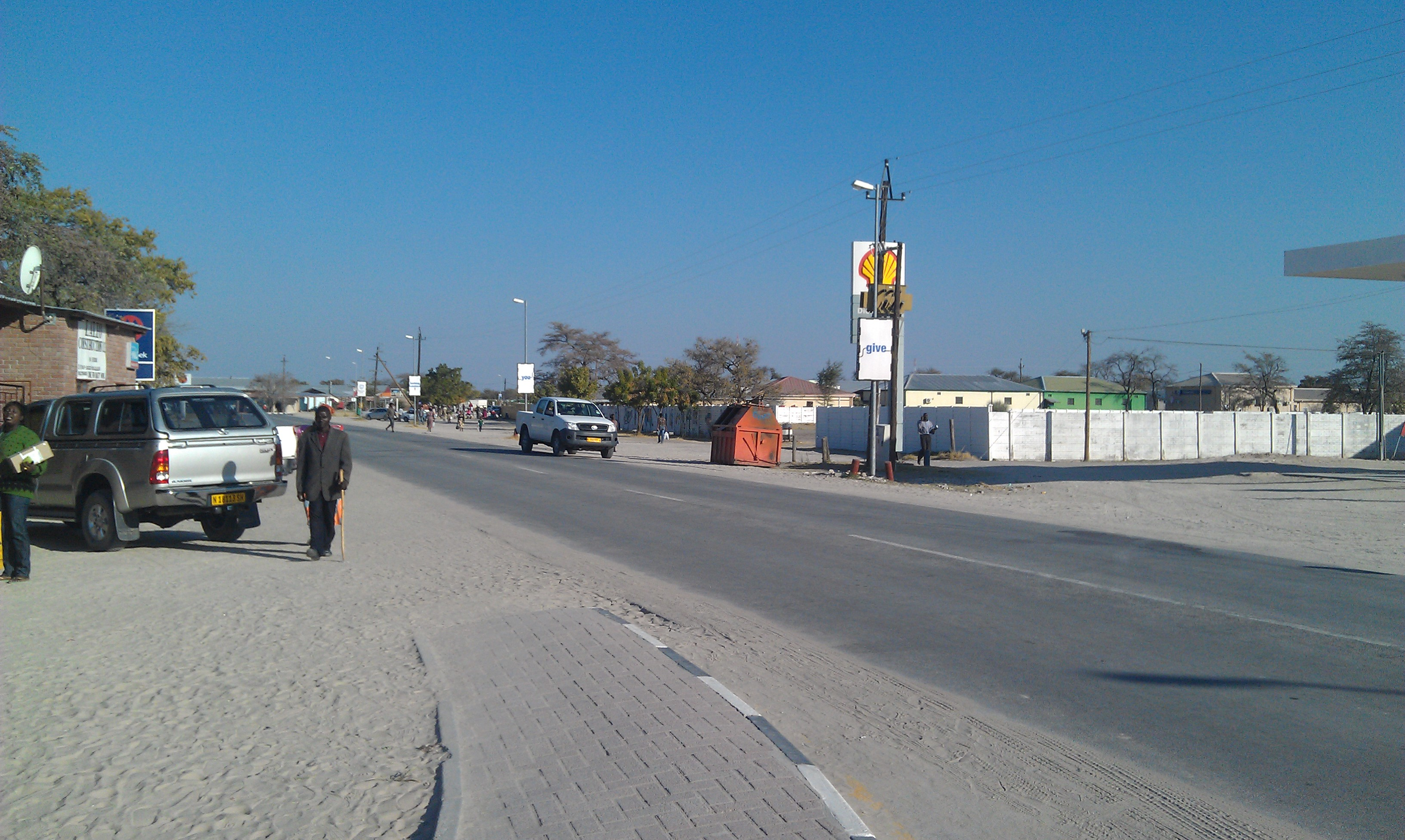
A Main Street in Eenhana

Eenhana is governed by a town council that has seven seats.

The 2015 local authority election was won by SWAPO which gained six seats (1,322 votes). The remaining seat was won by the Rally for Democracy and Progress (RDP) with 152 votes. SWAPO also won the 2020 local authority election. It obtained 1,182 votes and gained five seats. The Independent Patriots for Change (IPC), an opposition party formed in August 2020, obtained 402 votes and gained the remaining two seats.
