= Linda Helenius =

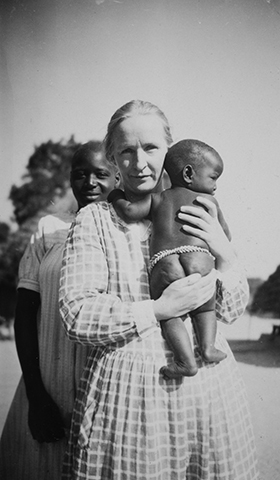
Linda Helenius.

Linda Helenius (July 5, 1894 in Pöytyä – April 18, 1960 in Helsinki) was a Finnish nurse, missionary and writer. Helenius was among the Finnish Evangelical Lutheran Mission missionaries in Owamboland (modern Namibia and Angola) in 1921–1952. She took a hospital position in the Oukwanyama territory, first at Engela and then Eenhana.

In 1922 she opened a small clinic in Kwanyama; she established another medical base in Eenhana in 1933.

== Writings (in Finnish) ==
- Etelän ristin alla: Kuvauksia lääkärilähetystyöstä Ambomaalla. Kirjoittajat Selma Rainio, Karin Hirn ja Linda Helenius. Suomen lähetysseura, Helsinki 1923
- Orjuuden kahleissa: Ambokristityt portugalilaisten sortamina. Suomen lähetysseura, Helsinki 1928
- Jumalan puutarha: Vaikutelmia työajaltani Ambomaalla. Suomen lähetysseura, Helsinki 1930
- Ambolainen veritodistaja. Suomen lähetysseura, Helsinki 1938
- ”Sillä pimeys katoaa...” Ambopastori Paulus Hamutenjan elämästä ja evankeliumin leviämisestä Uukuanjamaassa. Suomen lähetysseura, Helsinki 1942
- Terveisiä Ambomaalta. Kirjoittajat Anni Melander, Rauha Tamminen, Linda Helenius. WSOY 1942
- Venheestä alloille: Jumalan kätten tekoja Afrikan aarniometsissä. Vivamo-säätiö, Lohja 1957
- Vivamo ja sen asukkaiden vaiheita. Vivamo-säätiö, Lohja 1957.

== See also ==
- Selma Rainio
- Paulus Hamutenya

== Sources ==
- Linda Helenius in the writer encyclopaedia of Suomalaisen Kirjallisuuden Seura
- Kalliokoski, Ritva: Selma Rainio ensimmäisenä naislääkärinä Ambomaalle Afrikkaan. Lääkärilähetyksen 100-vuotisseminaari 20.9.2008.
