= Ohangwena Constituency =

Electoral constituency in the Ohangwena region of northern Namibia

Coordinates: 17°28′S 15°53′E

Ohangwena constituency (red) in the Ohangwena Region of Namibia

Ohangwena is a constituency in the Ohangwena Region of northern Namibia. It had 13,181 registered voters in 2020. It is named after the settlement of Ohangwena, today part of the town Helao Nafidi. The constituency had a population of 17,468 in 2011, down from 17,887 in 2001. The constituency office is situated in the Onhuno suburb of Helao Nafidi.

The constituency covers an area of 170 km^{2} (66 sq mi).

== Politics ==
As is common in all constituencies of former Owamboland, Namibia's ruling SWAPO Party has dominated elections since independence. In the 2004 regional election SWAPO candidate Usko Nghaamwa received 6,194 of the 6,243 votes cast.

SWAPO won the 2015 regional election by a landslide. Its candidate Johannes Hakanyome gathered 5,778 votes, while the opposition candidates Jeremia Haufiku of the Rally for Democracy and Progress (RDP) and Lukas Mbabi of the Democratic Turnhalle Alliance (DTA), received 346 and 123 votes, respectively. Councillor Hakanyome of SWAPO was reelected in the 2020 regional election, albeit by a smaller margin. He received 3,423 votes, followed by Vilho Shimuoshili, an independent candidate, with 1,644 votes.
