= Oshikango Constituency =

Electoral constituency in the Ohangwena region of northern Namibia

Coordinates: 17°24′S 15°53′E

Oshikango constituency (red) in the Ohangwena Region of Namibia

Oshikango is a constituency in the town of Helao Nafidi in the Ohangwena Region of northern Namibia, on the border to Angola. It had 17,480 registered voters in 2020. It is named after the settlement of Oshikango, today part of the town Helao Nafidi.

Oshikango Constituency covers an area of 261 km^{2} (101 sq mi). It had a population of 28,635 in 2011, up from 21,706 in 2001. The constituency office is situated in Edundja.

== Politics ==
As is common in all constituencies of former Owamboland, Namibia's ruling SWAPO Party has dominated elections since independence. The first councillor of Oshikango Constituency was SWAPO politician Michael Hishikushitja. He was elected to represent Ohangwena region in the National Council of Namibia and served in both positions until his death in 2001. In the 2004 regional election SWAPO candidate Hiyavela Usco Nambinga received 7,303 of the 7,370 votes cast.

SWAPO also won the 2015 regional election by a landslide. Its candidate Fillippus Namundjebo gathered 6,023 votes, while the opposition candidates Timotheus Shikongo of the Rally for Democracy and Progress (RDP) and Gabriel Shikudule of the Democratic Turnhalle Alliance (DTA), received 451 and 172 votes, respectively. SWAPO also won the 2020 regional election. Its candidate Ester Nghidimbwa received 4,782 votes, far ahead of Timotheus Shikongo of the Independent Patriots for Change (IPC), an opposition party formed in August 2020, who obtained 980 votes.
