= Onandjokwe State Hospital =

Geography
- Location: Oniipa Oshikoto Region, Namibia
- Coordinates: 17.91196°S 16.04205°E

Organisation
- Care system: Public
- Type: Government-run hospital
- Affiliated university: Finnish Missionary Society

Services
- Emergency department: Yes

Helipads
- Helipad: No

History
- Founded: 1911

Links
- Lists: Hospitals in Namibia

Onandjokwe State Hospital, until 2016 Onandjokwe Lutheran Hospital, is the oldest hospital in the northern part of Namibia. It was built in 1911 by the Finnish Missionary Society under the leadership of Selma Rainio. The hospital was operated by the Evangelical Lutheran Church in Namibia (ELCIN) via Lutheran Medical Services until 2016, when the Government of Namibia took over. The hospital hosts a medical museum, the only one in Namibia.

Onandjokwe State Hospital is located in Oniipa in Oshikoto Region, 10 km (6.2 mi) southeast of Ondangwa. Ondangwa town has a population of 36,800 according to the 2011 census data and has a small airport.

Onandjokwe serves as the primary health care centre for the Onandjokwe District of the Oshikoto Region which has a size of approximately 25,000 km^{2} (9,700 sq mi). According to the most recent census data of 2011, the population of the Oshikoto Region is 181,600 of which Oniipa make up a population of 24 800. Onandjokwe is staffed by 240 nurses, both full-time nurses and nursing students, as well as by 22 doctors. The hospital has 470 beds, ten different wards and nine smaller clinics and other services.

== History ==
Onandjokwe hospital was the first medical centre in northern Namibia. It was officially opened in 1911. It is also the first building in this part of the country to have a corrugated iron roof. The hospital is located east of the Oniipa settlement in Ondonga Kingdom and is situated near a valley that was infested with black birds locally known as oondjohwi from which the hospital derives its name. Oral history claims that king Kambonde of Ondonga, who allocated the land to the missionaries to construct the hospital on, deliberately chose the site as it was a sacred for traditional healers. It was felt that it would be wise for all health practitioners to be in the same vicinity.

In October 1908 the Finnish Evangelic Lutheran Mission sent Selma Rainio with two female missionaries to Ondonga – Ovamboland in what was then South West Africa. She arrived in Ovamboland in December 1908. Rainio was born on 21 March 1873 in Saarijärvi in Central Finland to Anton Lilius and Amanda Sofia Perden. She developed a strong religious belief at the age of 17 after her recovery from a serious typhoid fever. Her desire to become a doctor came about as a result of nursing her father who had suffered a stroke. Rainio registered at the University of Helsinki in 1896. When she graduated there was a search for missionary doctors to China and Africa. She chose the work of a missionary doctor in Africa.

The Church was the centre of this hospital. Rainio believed in prayer and insisted that prayers be a necessary practice conducted at the hospital's outpatient wards and especially at the theatre.

Rainio started treating patients at Oniipa Mission Station, without a hospital. Being the first doctor in the area, she is said to have treated up to 40 people daily without an assistant. The need for a hospital became apparent and a piece of land was allocated to the Missionary Society for the purpose of building a hospital. The need for a hospital became apparent as a result of inadequate medical supply during 1911 when large number of people where dying as a result of the famine and an epidemic that swept Ondonga from 1907 to 1909. Rainio, later affectionately known as "Kuku gwaNandjokwe" (meaning Onandjokwe's grandmother) by the natives that needed a proper hospital to provide urgent treatment for the people, was appointed the District Surgeon and leader of the hospital.

The hospital consisted of a one block building and had an out-patient clinic, a pharmacy, an operating room, and rooms for staff. The hospital was also used as training hub for aspiring nurses. By 1938 the Onandjokwe hospital boasted with an operating room equipped with anaesthetic, air conditioning, electricity lighting, sterilisers and an operating table. Rainio died at Onandjokwe in January 1939 after 31 years of service, and is buried in the hospital cemetery Oniitewa with her patients and her co-workers.

== Onandjokwe Medical Training School ==
Nurses began formal training at Onandjokwe Hospital in 1930 by Dr Selma Rainio, who was assisted by Dr Karin Hirn. Onandjokwe was the first School of Nursing to be established in Namibia.

The school began with four students, of which three were men and one was a woman in 1930. In 1961, the school of Auxiliary Nursing was officially recognised by the South African Nursing Council and in 1964 the School of Midwifery was officially recognised by the South African Nursing Council. By 1994, the School of Nursing was accredited by the University of Namibia to train nurses. By 2011, the school has trained many nurses in the following categories:

- Nursing Assistants
- Enrolled Nurses
- Midwives
- Registered Nurses

Today, the Onandjokwe School of Nursing is also known as Oshoopala and is considered to be alive and vibrant.

== Fire ==
By 1958 the hospital consisted out of about 70 buildings made up by "Rondawels" or round thatched huts which were enclosed with clay walls to act as in-patient wards, there were nurses accommodation, a kitchen, a workshop and other hospital facilities. On 4 October 1958 a fire broke out, legend has it that a crow picked up a piece of porridge which boiled over and perched on one of the thatched roofs to consume the porridge, unfortunately the porridge contained some live ember, causing the thatch roof to catch fire (Ntuleni and Shiweda 2011, p. 43). Within an hour, approximately 40 buildings had burnt down, engulfing many of the medical equipment and diesel generator. Miraculously there were no deaths as the community, Finnish and Ovambo health workers demonstrated great co-operation and teamwork to care for the patients and to fight the fire. In the aftermath, the damage was estimated at an astounding £45 000.00 (Ntuleni and Shiweda 2011, p. 43) Some rumours cited the fire as a curse to the Ondonga kingdom, but this was laid to rest quickly as the Ondonga community had learned to trust the people and the work being done by the hospital.

Nearly a 100 years later, the Namibian government in conjunction with the Finnish Churches renovated the Onandjokwe hospital. While construction of the water networks was underway, a piece of burnt wood, believed to be remainders of one of the wooden poles used in the huts, was discovered. The woods shape resembled that of wings and Rev. Julius Mtuleni immediately dubbed it "the Angel". He asked a welder, Mr Jarmo Lehtine to attached it to an angel shaped piece of iron. This angel is now believed to protect the hospital from bad things and has since become the logo for the Onandjokwe Medical museum.

== Present ==
Onandjokwe Hospital, which serves as the primary health care facility for the Onandjokwe District of the Oshikoto Region, is still run by the Lutheran Church of Namibia via Lutheran Medical Services and subsidized by the Government of the Republic of Namibia. The Onandjokwe District has a size of approximately 25 000 km with an annual growth rate of 2.2%.

Today, Onandjokwe Hospital, one of the oldest hospitals in the Northern part of Namibia has 470 beds and 10 different wards for Gynaecology, Medical Male, Medical Female, Surgery Female, Maternity, Surgery Male & ICU, Paediatric, TB, Communicable diseases, Private Ward and the 11th ward which, by 2004 was not in use, but was planned to be a low cost ward employs 240 nurses, both full-time and nursing students, as well as 22 doctors. Census figures of 2001 indicated that the population of the catchment area was 147 179, and with an annual growth of 2.2%, this figure is expected to have been around 187000 by end of 2012 and the number of nursing staff and doctors would have increased proportionally.

It has been recorded that Onandjokwe Hospital had a total of 260 410 visits in 2004 and 75% of these were first visits and 15% were examined by a doctor. There are also a number of smaller clinics and services including Eye clinic, Dental clinic, Rehabilitation therapy, X-ray department, Mortuary, Pharmacy, Social work, Antenatal Care and Pathology laboratory which is run by Namibia Institute of Pathology (NIP). There is also a nursing college with an annual student intake of between 100 and 150.

The entire Health District has a high and rising number of HIV-positive people who become hospital patients at Onandjokwe. The hospital's facilities were over-utilised as a result until in May 2005 a separate HIV/AIDS centre was opened.

The Shanamutango Centre for Integrated Care and Support is the hospital's newest building and is specifically designed for the provision of treatment to HIV patients. Funded by the United States Government Plan for Emergency AIDS Relief (PEPFAR), Shanamutango Centre was featured in a speech by former United States President George Bush on World AIDS Day in 2005.

Onandjokwe Medical Museum, the first of its kind in Namibia, was established in 2013.

== Leadership ==
The hospital was operated by the Evangelical Lutheran Church in Namibia (ELCIN) via Lutheran Medical Services until 2016, when the Government of Namibia took over. Past management of the hospital and health district included Godwin Marufu (Principal Medical Officer 2011–2013 and Igor Petrov (Medical Superintendent) who coordinated the management of the 2013 Anthrax outbreak, and the establishment of the Medical Museum.

== See also ==
- Oniipa Training School A nearby medical training school with similar origins.
