= List of libraries in Namibia =

Namibia has a total of 231 libraries. 78 of the libraries have reliable internet access. a total of 258, 283 registered users and 358, 087 physical loans.

Library	Location	Year established	Website	Type
National Library of Namibia	Windhoek	1926 (established in 1994)	http://www.nln.gov.na/	National Library
Namibia Parliament Library	Windhoek		https://www.parliament.na/library-and-computer-services/	Parliament Library
University of Namibia Library	Windhoek	1992	https://library.unam.edu.na/	Academic Library
Namibia University of Science and Technology Library	Windhoek	1994	https://library.nust.na/	Academic Library
International University of Management Library	Windhoek	1994	https://ium.edu.na/	Academic Library
Welwitschia University Library	Windhoek	2014	https://www.wu.edu.na/page/library-information-services/	Academic Library
I-Care Health Training Institute Library	Windhoek	2019		Academic Library
Goethe Institut Namibia Library	Windhoek			Special Library
National Earth Science and Energy Information Center	Windhoek	1994		Special Library
Windhoek Public Library	Windhoek			Public Library
Otjomuise Community Library				
Greenwell Matongo Community Library				
Ministry of Information Communications and Technology Library	Omusati Region			Ministerial Library
Omusati Regional Council Library	Omusati Region			Community Library
Ohangwena Regional Library|	Ohangwena Region	2014	https://nlas.info/sub-divisions/community-library-services/	Community Library
Eenhana Community Library	Ohangwena Region		https://nlas.info/sub-divisions/community-library-services/	Community Library
Omugwelume Community Library	Ohangwena Region		https://nlas.info/sub-divisions/community-library-services/	Community Library
Okongo Community Library	Ohangwena Region		https://nlas.info/sub-divisions/community-library-services/	Community Library
Swakopmund Community library	Erongo Region		https://nlas.info/sub-divisions/community-library-services/	Community Library
Hentiesbay Community Library	Erongo Region		https://nlas.info/sub-divisions/community-library-services/	Community Library
Omaruru Community Library	Erongo Region		https://nlas.info/sub-divisions/community-library-services/	Community Library
Usakos Community Library	Erongo Region		https://nlas.info/sub-divisions/community-library-services/	Community Library
Karibib Community Library	Erongo Region		https://nlas.info/sub-divisions/community-library-services/	Community Library
Arandis Community Library	Erongo Region		https://nlas.info/sub-divisions/community-library-services/	Community Library
Walvisbaai Community Library	Erongo Region		https://nlas.info/sub-divisions/community-library-services/	Community Library
Kuisebmund Community Library	Erongo Region		https://nlas.info/sub-divisions/community-library-services/	Community Library
Narraville Community Library	Erongo Region		https://nlas.info/sub-divisions/community-library-services/	Community Library
Katima Mulilo Community Library	Zambezi Region		https://nlas.info/sub-divisions/community-library-services/	Community Library
Kabbe Community Library	Zambezi Region		https://nlas.info/sub-divisions/community-library-services/	Community Library
Ngoma	Zambezi Region		https://nlas.info/sub-divisions/community-library-services/	Community Library
Tsumeb Community Library	Oshikoto Region		https://nlas.info/sub-divisions/community-library-services/	Community Library
Omuthiya Community Library	Oshikoto Region		https://nlas.info/sub-divisions/community-library-services/	Community Library
Tsintsabis Community Library	Oshikoto Region		https://nlas.info/sub-divisions/community-library-services/	Community Library
Auala Community Library	Oshikoto Region		https://nlas.info/sub-divisions/community-library-services/	Community Library
Rundu Community Library	Kavango East Region		https://nlas.info/sub-divisions/community-library-services/	Community Library
Shinyungwe Community Library	Kavango East Region		https://nlas.info/sub-divisions/community-library-services/	Community Library
Mukwe Community Library	Kavango East Region		https://nlas.info/sub-divisions/community-library-services/	Community Library
Rehoboth Community Library	Hardap Region		https://nlas.info/sub-divisions/community-library-services/	Community Library
Mariental Community Library	Hardap Region		https://nlas.info/sub-divisions/community-library-services/	Community Library
Aranos Community Library	Hardap Region		https://nlas.info/sub-divisions/community-library-services/	Community Library
Maltahohe Community Library	Hardap Region		https://nlas.info/sub-divisions/community-library-services/	Community Library
Gibeon Community Library	Hardap Region		https://nlas.info/sub-divisions/community-library-services/	Community Library
Gochas Community Library	Hardap Region		https://nlas.info/sub-divisions/community-library-services/	Community Library
Kalkrand Community Library	Hardap Region		https://nlas.info/sub-divisions/community-library-services/	Community Library
Keetmanshoop Community Library	Karas Region		https://nlas.info/sub-divisions/community-library-services/	Community Library
Bethanie Community Library	Karas Region		https://nlas.info/sub-divisions/community-library-services/	Community Library
Koes Community Library	Karas Region		https://nlas.info/sub-divisions/community-library-services/	Community Library
Ruderitz Community Library	Karas Region		https://nlas.info/sub-divisions/community-library-services/	Community Library
Karasburg Community Library	Karas Region		https://nlas.info/sub-divisions/community-library-services/	Community Library
Warmbad Community Library	Karas Region		https://nlas.info/sub-divisions/community-library-services/	Community Library
Aroab Community Library	Karas Region		https://nlas.info/sub-divisions/community-library-services/	Community Library
Rosh Pina Community Library	Karas Region		https://nlas.info/sub-divisions/community-library-services/	Community Library
Oranjemund Community Library	Karas Region		https://nlas.info/sub-divisions/community-library-services/	Community Library
Nkurenkure Community Library	Kavango West Region		https://nlas.info/sub-divisions/community-library-services/	Community Library
Khorixas Community Library	Kunene Region		https://nlas.info/sub-divisions/community-library-services/	Community Library
Outjo Community Library	Kunene Region		https://nlas.info/sub-divisions/community-library-services/	Community Library
Kamanjab Community Library	Kunene Region		https://nlas.info/sub-divisions/community-library-services/	Community Library
Opuwo Community Library	Kunene Region		https://nlas.info/sub-divisions/community-library-services/	Community Library
Oshakati Regional Library	Oshana Region		https://nlas.info/sub-divisions/community-library-services/	Community Library
Rossing Ondangwa Community Library	Oshana Region		https://nlas.info/sub-divisions/community-library-services/	Community Library
Uugwangula Community Library	Oshana Region		https://nlas.info/sub-divisions/community-library-services/	Community Library
Grootfontein Community Library	Otjozondjupa Region		https://nlas.info/sub-divisions/community-library-services/	Community Library
Otjiwarongo Community Library	Otjozondjupa Region		https://nlas.info/sub-divisions/community-library-services/	Community Library
Okahandja Community Library	Otjozondjupa Region		https://nlas.info/sub-divisions/community-library-services/	Community Library
Otavi Community Library	Otjozondjupa Region		https://nlas.info/sub-divisions/community-library-services/	Community Library
Tsumkwe Community Library	Otjozondjupa Region		https://nlas.info/sub-divisions/community-library-services/	Community Library
