= Loide Pashukeni Shinavene =

Namibian politician

Personal details
- Born: 8 May 1945 (age 80) Edundja, Ohangwena Region
- Party: SWAPO
- Occupation: Politician

Loide Pashukeni Shinavene (born 8 May 1945) is a retired Namibian politician of the SWAPO Party. She was a member in the National Assembly of the Republic of Namibia in 2015 until her retirement in 2020.

== Education ==
In 1964 Shinavene attended the Training College in Okahao, Namibia where she obtained a Teaching Certificate in 1966. She further pursued and obtained a Certificate in Pan-African Women Leadership at Kitwe, Zambia in 1975 where she further went on to obtain a National Diploma in Public Administration and Management majoring in Law and Public Management at the United Nations Institute for Namibia in Lusaka, Zambia.

In 1986 Shinavene graduated from the Hague, Netherlands where she obtained a Diploma in Research on Women and Development and a master's degree of Arts majoring in Women/Gender and Development Agendas in 1989.

== Career ==
Shinavene began her career as a teacher in 1970 at Mandume Primary School and later at Ondobe Secondary School in 1967. Her political career began in 1980 when she was appointed as Information Officer for the SWAPO Party Women Council and the Pan-African Women's Organisation for five years, she further went on to serve the SWAPO Party Women Council as Assistant Secretary for Finance and Projects in 1991.

In 1992 Shinavene was appointed as Development Planner at the Ministry of Agriculture Water and Rural Development and later as Trainer of Chief Agricultural Officers on Gender in 1997 until 2005 when she officially retired as a civil servant for the Government of Namibia.

In 2015 March she was among the current members of the National Assembly of the Republic of Namibia who were elected to serve under the leadership of President Hage Geingob for a five-year term which began in 2015 and ends in 2020.
