= Michael Hishikushitja =

Namibian politician (1953–2001)

Michael Ndapamapedu Hishikushitja (22 November 1953 – 27 September 2001) was a Namibian parliamentarian.

Hishikushitja was born and grew up in Onamunama, close to the Angolan border in the Ohangwena Region of Namibia. In the 1970s he attended school at St Mary Mission School in Odibo, where he later also worked as teacher until it was closed in 1979. He spied for the People's Liberation Army of Namibia, the armed wing of SWAPO, and assisted people wanting to cross the border to Angola.

In 1979 he took up a position as an English teacher in Engela for the Council of Churches in Namibia. When his political involvement became known to the South African administration, he was forced to move to Windhoek. The Anglican Church sent him into British exile where he completed a master's degree in education.

After Namibian independence Michael Hishikushitja was elected Regional Councillor of the Oshikango Constituency, a position he held until he died. When the National Council of Namibia was formed in 1993, he was one of the Regional Councillors to be elected to serve. He was vice chairperson of the first National Council, and SWAPO Chief Whip of the second. He also was a member of the Commonwealth Parliamentary Association, and the chairperson of the Standing Committee on Constitutional and Legal Affairs.

Hishikushitja was married with two daughters. He died from a heart attack shortly before his 48th birthday. Sam Nujoma, then President of the Republic of Namibia, spoke at his funeral, calling him "one of [Namibia's] most active and effective young Parliamentarians."
