= Seppo Salko =

Seppo Ilmari Salko (20 April 1941 in Oulu, Finland — 10 September 2026 Orivesi, Finland) was a Finnish elementary school teacher and a missionary to Taiwan with the Finnish Missionary Society (FMS), and together with his wife the longest serving employee of the FMS dormitory in Taichung, Taiwan.

== Education ==
Salko went to school in Lappeenranta, Finland. During his early years there he became acquainted and friends with Sakari Pinola, who later recruited him to missionary work in Taiwan. Salko said he “grew up together” with Pinola.

During his years at school, Salko was such a pious man that his classmates called him “pastor”. He participated in the Lappeenranta parish youth group of mission friends. He did not go to high school, but instead studied to become a teacher in the Heinola Seminary, where he met his wife to be, Marja-Liisa Raulamo, who came from Tampere. Salko graduated in 1964, and Raulamo the following year. It appears that the Salkos got married in 1965. Part of the engagement was a pledge to go out as missionaries.

== Work in Finland ==
The next five years the Salkos worked as teachers in Ristijärvi in the Kainuu province. During that time they furthered the missionary cause in the parish. Salko reported in the FMS magazine Suomen Lähetyssanomat in 1970 of a lunch that was arranged as a fundraiser, which had yielded more than 3000 Finnish marks for mission work. After the five years in Ristijärvi, the Salkos found themselves in 1970 in the mission candidates’ course with the FMS in Helsinki.

== Work as a missionary in Taiwan ==
The Salkos left from Finland to Taiwan on 19 October 1971. Their first term as missionaries in Taiwan lasted from 1971 to 1975. They used their first year in Taiwan studying the local languages. After that they began their work in The Finnish dormitory in Taichung, which at the time was operated in rented premises. The Finnish children attended Morrison Academy, an American school that functioned in Taichung. The distance from the children's homes to the school was between 200 and 300 kilometers.

Due to a change in the city plan, Morrison had to abandon its old campus and built a new one outside the city. At this stage, a separate building for the Finnish dormitory was built on the new campus. The planning of the dormitory building had many twists and turns, but in the end Seppo Salko had the final word in determining what the building was to be like.

In 1974, the Salkos wrote about their work as follows:

Our new home offers better living quarters for our children, as well as a quiet atmosphere for studying and possibilities for leisure activities. Housekeeping, too, has become easier due to the more spacious and practical premises. A completely new thing to be glad about is the Finnish sauna that was built next to the main bathroom. The children’s playing room is so large that lessons can be arranged there. Even though the curriculum of the American school is mostly similar to those of Finnish schools, it is natural that they give weight to different subjects. The Finnish language and Finnish geography are subjects in which we must provide complementary instruction, so that the children will be prepared for their return to Finland.

All in all we believe that the Lord Himself has created this possibility before us and opened the gates for us. With the same costs we could never offer Finnish education of the same quality and diversity from preschool to ‘matriculation’.

Our new dormitory is an answer to many years of prayers. We, the ‘parents’, pray continually that this home could fulfill its task: to be such a good place to the children that their parents could safely and free of worries dedicate themselves to their proper work.

During the school year 1975–76, the Salkos had a furlough in Finland, and another missionary couple, Simo and Tarja Lipasti, ran the dormitory during that time.

The Salkos’ second term began in 1976 and ended in 1980, and the third term lasted from 1981 to 1985.

During the furloughs, Salko worked in the FMS headquarters in Helsinki. During 1975–76 he was responsible for the circulation of the FMS magazine Suomen Lähetyssanomat and during 1980–81 he worked as the head of the audiovisual productions.

After the Salkos’ third term, the FMS decided in 1985 that no one would be allowed to work at the Taichung dormitory for more than two terms. Thus, in 1985 the Salkos remained in Finland.

During 1985–87 Salko worked in the FMS as the person in charge of matters dealing with scholarship students in Finland, until the FMS reversed its decision on the “two terms” rule at the dormitory and sent the Salkos for a fourth term during 1987–91.

== Working in Finland 1991–95 ==
The Salkos returned to Finland for good in 1991. After this, Salko worked with the FMS, assigned to the Lapua Diocese and after this during 1992–95 as the person responsible for the functioning of the FMS Mission Church at the FMS headquarters in Helsinki. He was listed in this capacity also in the 1996 and 1997 FMS yearbooks, although he no longer worked in this assignment.

== Work with homeless children in St. Petersburg ==
As a pensioner, Salko participated in work with homeless children in St. Petersburg, Russia. He did this as part of the Aitomiehet (‘real men’) group of the Aitolahti Parish in Tampere.

He can be seen posing with other “real men” in the group's 2014 Christmas photograph.

== Sources ==
- Suomen Lähetyssanomat, 1970–74.
- Yearbook of the Finnish Missionary Society 1971–1997.
- Ijäs, Anne (April 1987). Taiwanissa olevan Suomen Lähetysseuran koulukodin kehitys vuosina 1968–1980 [The development of the dormitory of the Finnish Missionary Society in Taiwan during 1968–1980] (in Finnish). Master’s thesis in pedagogy, Helsinki University.
- Papers of the court case Prosecutor v. Ruokanen (2004, 2007). Helsinki Court of Appeals.
