= Lucia Nghaamwa =

Namibian politician (born 1946)

MP Lucia Nghaamwa

Member of the National Assembly of Namibia
- In office 20 March 2015 – 20 March 2020

Personal details
- Born: September 24, 1946 (age 80) Ohangwena Region, Namibia

Lucia Nghaamwa (born 24 September 1946) is a Namibian politician. A member of the South West Africa People's Organization, she served as a member of National Assembly of Namibia from 2015 to 2020. She is married to Usko Nghaamwa, a fellow SWAPO politician who previously served as the Governor of Ohangwena Region.

In 2018, Nghaamwa proposed educational requirements for parents to serve on school boards.
