= The Finnish dormitory in Taichung =

Coordinates: 24°11′17.60″N 120°40′50.00″E

The Finnish dormitory in Taichung, Taiwan, was a facility that was run by the Finnish Missionary Society in Taichung during the years 1968–1997. From 1973 on the dormitory was located within the campus of Morrison Academy. This dormitory was the subject of a master's thesis in pedagogy in Helsinki University in 1987.

The dormitory was run by ca. 20 different Finnish missionaries, longest of whom served Seppo and Marja-Liisa Salko, who are the only employees there mentioned by Tapani Ruokanen in his 1978 book as well as in the dissertation of Mirja Pesonen, which dealt with Taiwan as a mission field of the Finnish Missionary Society. The dormitory has been a subject of intense media interest in Finland in 1999, 2001 and 2013.

The following is a description of the dormitory mainly during the years 1968–80, which is the time period covered by Anne Ijäs in her 1987 master's thesis. No such account of the later years exists.

== Background ==
The Finnish Missionary Society began missionary work in Taiwan in 1956. The first family with children was sent there in 1959. The first Finnish child in the mission field became of school age in 1963, and he was enrolled in Morrison Academy, an American school that was located in Taichung. Morrison had been founded in 1952. By 1965, a total of four Finnish children attended Morrison, and they all lived in the dormitory of the school.

== The discussion leading up to the founding of the Finnish dormitory ==
From 1965 on, the schooling of the Finnish missionary children in Taiwan began to be contemplated seriously. There were two alternatives: either a Finnish school would have to be founded on the island, or the children would have to attend Morrison, and a Finnish dormitory would be arranged for these children.

According to Ijäs, the following arguments were put forward in this discussion:

=== Arguments for a Finnish school ===
The arguments for a Finnish school were the following:

- The school could be established in the area where the parents were working. This would mean that the children would have a better possibility of being acquainted with their parents’ work.
- No budget allotments would be needed for transportation expenses or for tuitions
- The instruction could be given in the native language of the children
- The subjects taught would be the same as in Finland
- Finnish identity and culture would be better represented

=== Arguments against a Finnish school ===
The following arguments against a Finnish school were put forward:

- The school would be small one, and therefore the academic standards would be poor
- The children would not learn English as well as in Morrison
- No high school grades could be included
- There would be a lack of competition among the students
- Not all the parents would want to put their children in a school like this

=== Arguments for Morrison Academy ===
The following points were seen as positive with the children attending Morrison:

- The children will learn English and
- They will become “world citizens”, so to speak
- Morrison was known to have high academic standards
- The children would have more friends in Morrison
- Morrison gives high emphasis to religion
- Attending Morrison, the children would have a possibility to enter Helsinki University

=== Arguments against Morrison Academy ===
The following points were seen as negative with the children attending Morrison:

- The children will become more American than Finnish
- The children will not learn the Finnish language
- Morrison has high tuition fees
- Trips from home to the school will take quite a lot to time and money
- The Finnish dormitory will be no substitute for the children's homes

== The question of the school vs. dormitory is resolved ==
The board of the mission field came to the conclusion that establishing a Finnish school on the island was a project that was too large in scale to be undertaken by the Finnish Missionary Society. It was also felt that after a four-year elementary school the families would have to return to Finland in order that the children could proceed with their education. Also the bad experiences of the Norwegians in Taiwan were taken into account. It was also pointed out that Morrison was widely known as “the best school in Asia.” When it was taken into account that the Christian world view of this school was similar to that of the missionaries and that at Morrison the children would learn “the universally useful English language”, the decision was made that the children would attend Morrison and live in a Finnish dormitory. However, even as late as 1970, the leadership of the mission society in Finland was still in favor of establishing a Finnish school on the island.

== Premises ==
=== First premises ===
The dormitory began its operation in rented premises in the autumn of 1968, with Miss Ursula Zidbeck as the head and only Finnish employee. The premises were small, but each of the six students had their own room, and the school was located within a few minutes’ walk from the dormitory. Thus the students came to the dormitory for their lunches.

=== Second premises ===
In the autumn of 1970, Miss Pirjo Lahti, a business college graduate, replaced Zidbeck. During Lahti's tenure, Morrison Academy had to relocate, as the city zoning was changed and a main road was planned right across the campus. The school moved to an area outside the city at the time, and the Finnish dormitory likewise moved to a place nearer the new location, again into rented premises. The distance to the school was now ca. five kilometers.

In 1971 the board of the mission field applied for money from the mission society in order to purchase a lot for a new dormitory. The board of the mission field agreed with the suggestion from Morrison that they build the dormitory on campus, on a lot given to them. One of the advantages of this decision was that the dorm would be in an area that was guarded by the school. This was a great advantage in a country where thefts were quite common.

While the dormitory still operated in rented premises, a new couple from Finland, Seppo and Marja-Liisa Salko, arrived in the autumn of 1971 to Taiwan to work in the dormitory. The missionaries in Taiwan had requested specifically for this kind of a couple. The plan was that they would begin immediately at the dorm, but as they had just had a baby, they spent their first year in language school, and Pirjo Lahti continued at the dorm. The Salkos began in the dormitory in the autumn of 1972, and Miss Lahti took on other responsibilities in Taiwan.

=== Permanent premises ===
The mission board in Taiwan bought a triangular lot from Morrison for the new dormitory. It was located in the so-called Faculty Row. When making plans for the dormitory building, the Finnish missionaries turned to the head of the Finnish private school in Swakopmund, Namibia. The headmaster of the school in Swakopmund, Mr. Juhani Olanterä sent some suggestions in a letter he wrote to the Finns in Taiwan.

There were several twists and turns in the planning of the dormitory building. The first plans were made for a building that turned out to be too large for the lot. The floor plan also caused disagreements within the body of Finnish missionaries. For example, the excessively large number of entrances, at least five of them into the main building, caused controversies. In the end it was Seppo Salko who said the last word on the floor plan. The building included a Finnish sauna, separate bathrooms for boys and girls, and next to these, a room in which the children could play. In the summer of 1976, the boys’ bathroom was changed into a piano room, which was soundproof and was accessed from the room designated for children's playing. The floor plan of the building was published by Suomen Kuvalehti in 2001.

The construction work also had quite a few turns. A change was announced in city zoning regulations, to take effect in July 1973, and only those buildings that had a roof at that time were allowed to be completed. The mission headquarters made the decision to build the house only on 25 April 1973, and the construction was begun on 7 May 1973.

The official regulations on building were complex, and in addition to these difficulties, Salko only spoke Mandarin Chinese, whereas the construction workers spoke the Taiwanese dialect. The city zoning necessitated a special permit, and on top of everything else, the constructor was engulfed in gambling debts and left the work unfinished. Finally the building was completed on 15 December 1973, and the residents could move in.

In 1978 the premises were deemed too small for the number of children and adolescents living in the dorm, and thus a storehouse on the lot was converted into two additional rooms during the summer of that year. The students who lived there from then on were mainly highschoolers, boys and girls in alternating years.

== Employees ==
=== Employees during 1968–1985 ===
==== Permanent employees at the dormitory ====
Employees
| Years | Names | | References |
| 1968–70 | Ursula Zidbeck | | |
| 1972–75 | Seppo and Marja-Liisa Salko | | |
| 1976–80 | Seppo and Marja-Liisa Salko | | |
| 1981–84 | Seppo and Marja-Liisa Salko | | |
| 1984–85 | Seppo and Marja-Liisa Salko | Leena-Riitta Karvinen | |

==== Temporary employees of the dormitory ====
Employees
| Years | Names | References |
| 1970–72 | Pirjo Lahti | |
| 1975–76 | Simo and Tarja Lipasti | |
| 1977–79 | Matti and Mervi Nykänen | |
| 1980–81 | Pirkka and Liisa Mikkola | |

=== Permanent employees during 1985–1997 ===
Employees
| Years | Names | | References |
| 1985–86 | Leena-Riitta Karvinen | | |
| 1986–87 | Markku and Helka Silventoinen | | |
| 1987–88 | Seppo and Marja-Liisa Salko | | |
| 1988–91 | Seppo and Marja-Liisa Salko | Vuokko Krannila | |
| 1991–92 | Pirkko Kilpi | Vuokko Krannila | |
| 1992–93 | Juhani and Pirjo Malkamäki | | |
| 1993–96 | Heikki and Heleena Hilvo | | |
| 1996–97 | Jukka and Paula Pakarinen | | |

== Atmosphere and the daily routine during 1973–1980 ==
According to Ijäs, the atmosphere in the dormitory that was taken to use in 1973 was that of a normal home. “There was a direct entrance [i.e. a door] from the bedroom of the employees to the livingroom.” Later, by 1982, this door was no longer in use. Otherwise the homelike nature of the building was evident in the textiles used, in that there were flowers in the building and that the institution did not have any kinds of written rules, none whatsoever.

One of the most important tasks for the Salkos was maintaining a Finnish identity. This was facilitated e.g. by the fact that the children had their own surrogate “grandmother”, that, is Marja-Liisa Salko's mother Marjatta Raulamo, who came twice on extended visits, first for three months in the spring of 1974, and then for the entire school year 1976–1977.

The number of the students varied from four students in the autumn of 1969 to 22 students in the autumn of 1978. The ages were between 5 and 19 years of age.

There were also Chinese employees, usually two, one who helped in cleaning the house and another whose task it was to prepare food.

Ijäs quotes from Marjatta Raulamo the “working schedule” of the dormitory in 1976, which was the following:

- 6.30 a.m. Aunt Marja-Liisa and one of the maids go to the kitchen to prepare breakfast.
- 7.00 a.m. Children are woken up by Uncle Seppo, as he plays some beautiful spiritual music either from an LP record or from a cassette tape.
- 6.30 a.m. A morning hymn is sung, and Uncle Seppo holds a morning devotion, then everyone eats with great appetite. Then hands are washed and the hair of the “Struwwelpeters” are combed, shoes are put on, and the children dash off to school.
- The Chinese maids are involved in kitchen work, and the second one comes to the dormitory at 8 a.m. Aunt Marja-Liisa and grandmother make the beds, and the whole home is restored to order, laundry will be washed and other chores attended to. When the aunt and uncle do not have to drive to town, Seppo engages himself either in written works or building and remodeling.
- 11.30 a.m. The children come back for a Chinese lunch prepared by one of the maids. After the meal the maids retire for a siesta.
- 2.00 p.m. Afternoon coffee is prepared.
- 3.00 p.m. The children return from school, full of energy. After a snack and a drink each one of the children finds something to do, homework, music practice, handicrafts or play.
- 5.30 p.m. A Finnish dinner is served, after which the children go back to their activities.
- 6.00 p.m. The maids leave for the day.
- 7.00 p.m. It is already completely dark, so the children like to gather to the livingroom, from which they go off to evening shower, girls and boys starting on alternative basis. After the shower they listen to Uncle Seppo, who reads them stories. Then follows an evening hymn and prayers. The evening meal can be eaten before or after the evening gathering.
- 9.00 p.m. Silence.

== Instruction given in the dormitory ==
=== Instruction during Ursula Zidbeck’s tenure ===
During Miss Zidbeck's it seems that little instruction was given to the children at the dormitory. Lessons in Finnish history, geography and the Finnish language were given for one hour on four days of the week. Each evening Finnish stories or books for children and adolescents were read aloud, and an evening devotion was held before the smallest children were due to go to bed.

In addition, there was the following programme during the week:

- Tuesday: Finnish children's and folksongs were sung.
- Wednesday: evening programme prepared by Finnish missionaries who were studying in language school in Taichung.
- Thursdays: a night of fun, including games, songs, and contests.

The older students read the Seven brothers by Aleksis Kivi, the smaller children were engaged in handicrafts, and stories were read to them, songs were sung, and the children read on their own. The reading activity was hampered by the lack of suitable books, as the only books available were those that Miss Zidbeck owned personally from the time that she had attended elementary and secondary school.

=== Instruction during Pirjo Lahti’s tenure ===
During Pirjo Lahti's tenure the instruction seems to have been as modest as it was during her predecessor's time. However, no information concerning the instruction was filed in any archives. She tried to hold lessons in Finnish history, but the older students were not interested in this subject matter. Stories were read aloud to the younger children. Finnish flag flying days were observed.

=== Instruction during the Salkos’ tenure up to 1980 ===
During the Salkos’ tenure books used in Finnish comprehensive schools were obtained. At first Finnish instruction was given on Saturdays, on those weekends when the children did not go to their homes, but in 1978 an arrangement was arrived at with Morrison, according to which the Finnish instruction for elementary and middle schoolers was arranged during the school days. Elementary school classes were taught by Marja-Liisa Salko, and middle school classes by Seppo Salko. In middle school, these lessons were held during the hours when the children had elective classes. However, the Finnish children did not have a choice in this matter.

==== Instruction of Finnish history ====
In high school at Morrison, there were two compulsory subjects in social studies that all students normally had to take. These were US History and US Government and Life. In 1979 it was agreed with Morrison that Finnish students would have to take only one of these subjects, while instead of the other they took a compulsory course in Finnish history. This involved 160 hours of study, and the exams were given by the Kauriala High School in Hämeenlinna, Finland, via correspondence.

==== Instruction of the Swedish ====
Instruction of the Swedish language was begun already when Simo and Tarja Lipasti took care of the dormitory on a temporary basis during 1975–1976. The study materials were ordered from Finland. Beginning in the autumn of 1978, a Swedish speaking Finn, Miss Gunilla Ståhl, a missionary with the Finnish Covenant Church provided the instruction. The textbooks were obtained from Finland. As the time period examined by Ijäs ends in 1980, it is not possible to say how long the instruction in Swedish lasted.

==== Other subjects taught at the dormitory ====
Other subjects taught at the dormitory included geography, Finnish nature and Finnish civics. The textbooks included e.g. books by Lappalainen called Perusmaantieto (‘The Basics of Geography’) and Lappalainen et al., Kansalaistaito ja ympäristöoppi 3–4. (‘Civics and environmental awareness 3–4’).

== Support of the State of Finland ==
In 1973 the Finnish Missions Council, to which The Finnish Missionary Society also belongs, wrote an initiative to the Finnish Ministry of Education, asking that the Government of Finland give financial support to the Finnish children whose parents were abroad in missionary work and who were of the age in which they had compulsory education. In 1974 the Ministry of Education informed the missions that they had allotted moneys for this purpose, and in 1977 the Ministry gave orders on how expatriate Finnish children's schooling would be given financial assistance from Finland. As a result of this, The Finnish Missionary Society sent its first application to the Ministry in 1976, and this resulted in financial aid of 80 000 Finnish Marks to be used for the education of Finnish children in Namibia, Ethiopia and Taiwan. After this, the mission society sent an application to the ministry every year.

This financial aid was used for complementary education in Finnish and/or Swedish language, and for the salaries of the teachers, for study materials, mailing expenses of the study materials and for other expenses.

== Possibilities of further education ==
The possibilities of further study in Finland was something that the Mission Society wanted to find out in the autumn of 1979. Helsinki University stated that it would not give anyone a right to study at the university solely on the basis of a high school diploma from Morrison. Graduates from Morrison should first be accepted into some foreign university of similar institution, which issued doctor's degrees. After that a Morrison graduate could apply for Helsinki University as a foreign student. It turned out that each university or institution of higher learning in Finland had its own rules and regulations on the matter. By 1987, the number of Finnish graduates from Morrison was 17, and six of them studied in Finnish universities at the time, four had graduated from institutions that could be described as college level, and two studied in the United States. Two former students had themselves become missionaries in Taiwan .

== Hobbies ==
=== Music ===
The music teachers at Morrison were able to teach students to play almost any instrument. Thus many of the students of the Finnish dormitory played various instruments. Many of them played both the piano and some other instrument. In 1978, 14 students played the piano, and at times there were as many as three pianos at the dormitory, on which the students could practice.

The other instruments included the violin, the cello, the flute, the clarinet, the oboe, the trumpet, the saxophone, and the baritone horn. When there were a significant number of music students living at the dormitory, an orchestra was formed, led by Marja-Liisa Salko. They performed mainly in the dormitory's Christmas and spring festivities and at some events at Morrison.

Morrison had several orchestras and brass bands, in which the Finnish students also played, and also several choirs in which they sang.

=== Sports ===
From middle school on, it was possible engage in extracurricular sports at Morrison. Some of the events included soccer, basketball, and athletics. Training in these sports took place after the school day, and matches and meets were arranged between Morrison, on the one hand, and Chinese schools and other American schools on the island, on the other.

=== Other hobbies ===
Other hobbies included hiking in the mountains, which was done on a regular basis. It seems that photography was also a popular hobby, as the dormitory had its own darkroom from 1979 on. The school also provided an opportunity to pursue this hobby, as both a newspaper and a yearbook were published every year.

The girls had both a drama club and a Bible study group. The boys played intramural tournaments in table tennis, in which championship of the dormitory was determined. The younger girls were also active in girl guides and the younger boys had an Indian club and a father-son club.

In 1978 a group from the dormitory went to Taipei to cheer for a Finnish women's soccer team, which participated in an international tournament involving teams from 13 countries.

=== Home evenings ===
At least during the school year 1978–79, there was a so-called “home evening” after sauna. The children were divided into groups, and on each night one group would organize some kind of a programme for the entertainment of all.

== Festivities and other occasions ==
=== Festivities during the school ===
Certain festive occasions were part of the normal year of the dormitory, mainly Christmas celebration and a spring event to mark the end of the school year. The latter coincided with the end of the Morrison school year and their graduation ceremonies.

During the time period described by Ijäs, a “Finnish evening” was arranged in 1979 for the Finnish students in elementary and middle school and their teachers. Also the closest neighbours, the personnel of the Norwegian dormitory, were invited for an evening in October. Ijäs says that cooperation and mutual aid treaty of sorts existed between these two dormitories.

The Finnish Independence Day was celebrated in the same way as in Finland, with the flag of Finland and with blue and white candles, i.e. candles with the colours of the national flag.

=== Special occasions outside the school ===
During Christmas holidays an event called Saint Stephen's Day's songs were arranged for those Finns who lived in Taichung. This event highlighted the cohesion of the Finnish community in town. Also the eve of Midsummer was observed with the Taichung Finns.

During July, the Taiwan Missionary Fellowship was arranged in Taichung for all missionaries in Taiwan, and the Finns were accommodated at the dormitory during these meetings.

== The dormitory after 1980 ==
After 1980 the dormitory was in a state of transition, the main change being that the smallest children were no longer sent to the dormitory in Taichung, but by 1987 they had been allowed to attend the Morrison branch schools, mainly in Kaohsiung and in Taipei, and they could now live at home with their parents.

There was also a new regulation concerning the Finnish employees of the dormitory: their work at the dormitory was now limited to two terms. In practice, this rule was violated almost immediately, when Seppo and Marja-Liisa Salko were sent for their fourth term in 1987.

== Supporters of the dormitory ==
In his 1978 book Tehtävä Aasiassa (’A Mission in Asia’), Tapani Ruokanen says that the following Finnish congregations and organizations supported the dormitory financially at that time: The Virolahti, Mänttä, Ristijärvi congregations and the Kaleva congregation from Tampere, as well as the Teachers Mission Union in Finland.

== Suspicions of pedophilia in the dormitory ==
In 1999, the Finnish Missionary Society released news that it had commissioned study into the Finnish dormitory in Taiwan. The study was conducted by an independent expert group called Metodi Team Inc. The study was commissioned because many of the former wards at the dormitory had psychological problems. The team interviewed more than 100 persons, of whom roughly a third had lived at the dormitory, and roughly half had been employed by the FMS in Taiwan. The study showed that many of the former wards had been sexually abused in their childhood.

At first the FMS requested a police investigation, but soon they found that they are not a party in the matter, at least not from a judicial point of view, and they withdrew the request.

=== Investigations and articles by Suomen Kuvalehti ===
The Finnish newsmagazine Suomen Kuvalehti published in 2001 several articles on the Finnish dormitory in Taichung. The most important articles appeared on 8 June 2001, on the eve of the FMS annual convention, which was held on the following day.

A journalist affiliated with the newsmagazine travelled to Taiwan to investigate the dormitory, the alleged scene of crime, which the Finnish police had not done; they merely interviewed persons who were acquainted with the place. It turned out that the area of the house was “350 m², it felt large, it was a labyrinth-like place, the walls were made of brick, and the rooms in which the children had lived had airconditioning. Above the ceiling there was an empty attic, where a man could stand up straight. The journalist Pesonen had walked from one end of the house to the other, and no one below had noticed his movements. According to the witness, in the living room one could not hear what was going on at the other end of the house.”

Suomen Kuvalehti had interviewed two formed residents of the dormitory, who said that they had been abused sexually while living in the dormitory. In addition to this, the parents of one of these former students had been interviewed.

The newsmagazine had several questions it directed at the Finnish police:

- Why was the dormitory and other scenes not investigated [by the Finnish police]?
- Why did the authorities not interview all the witnesses and all the complainants?
- Why has some of the evidence [exhibits] has disappeared?
- Why did the authorities not obtain telephone records and why the threats made were not investigated?
- Why were the statements made by psychiatrists not given full consideration?
- Why was the statement made by a police psychologist given the most weight, when he himself considered himself not qualified [to give such a statement]?
- Why did [the authorities] not search for the medical files of the complainants and other victims and why were they not investigated?
- Why was the chief investigator dismissed from this case and assigned to other duties?
- Why was the case not given over to the National Bureau of Investigation and the Interpol?
- Why was the fact dismissed that it was a case of serial offences, that is, the perpetrators repeated their acts in a similar way in similar places?
- Why did the person in charge of the inquiries express doubts about the mental sanity of the complainants, even though he had not met them in person?”
