= Usko Nghaamwa =

Namibian politician

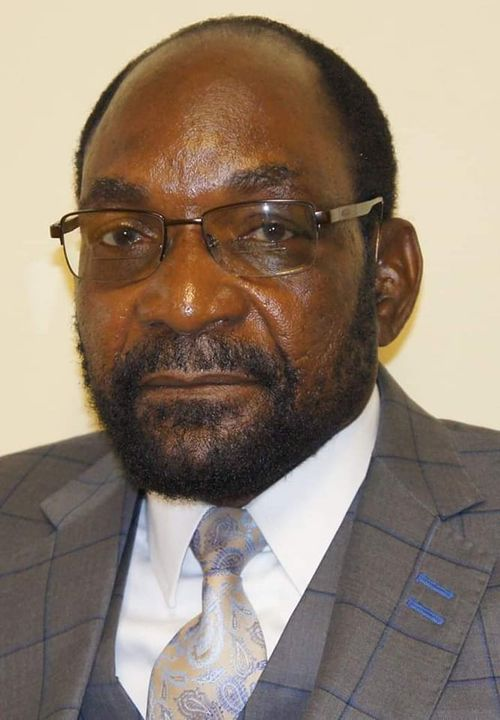
- Usko Nghaamwa

Governor of Ohangwena Region
- In office 2005–2020
- President: Hifikepunye Pohamba; Hage Geingob
- Preceded by: Billy Mwaningange
- Succeeded by: Walde Ndevashiya

Councillor of Ohangwena Constituency

Personal details
- Party: SWAPO
- Spouse: Lucia Nghaamwa
- Committees: SWAPO Party Central Committee

Usko Nghihepavali Nghaamwa (born 18 January 1944) is a Namibian businessman, politician, and philanthropist. He was born in Oipapakane village in the Ohangwena Region. Nghaamwa is a member of SWAPO.

== Political career ==
Nghaamwa was first elected councillor of Ohangwena Constituency. In the 2004 regional election, he received 6,194 of the 6,243 votes cast. In 2005, he was appointed governor of the Ohangwena Region. He held the position until 2020. In December 2022, Nghaamwa was elected to the SWAPO Party Central Committee.

== Philanthropy ==
Nghaamwa is well known in the North of Namibia, where he has donated to communities by giving school infrastructure, food to the needy, scholarships, plus flood and drought aid. In 2021, he donated N$100,000 for the new Namibia University of Science and Technology (NUST) campus to be constructed in Eenhana, his home region. He also hosts a Usko Nghaamwa Marathon, with the latest events having been hosted in collaboration with athlete Simon Shokonawa on 18 January 2022, his birthday.

Nghaamwa regularly donates to different schools in the Ohangwena region, among them Omungwelume Secondary School, which in 2023 was renamed UN Nghaamwa Secondary School in his honour.

== Private life ==
Nghaamwa is married to fellow SWAPO politician Lucia Nghaamwa, and Diana Murphy a former member of parliament. They have a daughter and own farms in the Kavango East and Ohangwena regions.
