= Onhuno =

Town in Namibia

Onhuno is a settlement in the Ohangwena Region of Namibia between Ongha and Ohangwena. Since the establishment of Helao Nafidi in 2004 it is a suburb of this town, although it still maintained its own village council until the 2015 local authority election.

The population is estimated to be around 7000 people. Onhuno is a developing place, the notable facilities in this area, is the weighbridge and a service station. The weighbridge, weighs trucks coming in and going out of Namibia. There is also a power station in Onhuno. beside that, there a lot of RDP follower, who intend to challenge the ruling party, they support this opposition party because of the certain reason, first thing there is no school, secondary nor primary, children have to travel long distance to get education on the nearby village, secondly there is no job opportunity like industry or any type of opportunity offered to other town or settlement, the only plantation available is not yet harvested.
