= Engela =

- Suburb of Helao Nafidi
- Location within Namibia
- Coordinates: 17°27′2″S 15°52′00″E
- Country: Namibia
- Region: Ohangwena Region
- Constituency: Engela Constituency
- Time zone: UTC+2 (South African Standard Time)

Engela is an Ovambo settlement in the Ohangwena Region in northern Namibia. Formerly situated in the Oukwanyama area it is since 2004 part of the town Helao Nafidi, although it still maintained its own village council until the 2015 local authority election. It is one of the more important establishments of the Evangelical Lutheran Church in Namibia (ELCIN) in the area. It started as a mission station of the Finnish Missionary Society. Today, it is the centre of the Engela Constituency.

== History of the mission station ==
Finnish missionaries first made visits to Oukwanyama in a place called Omafo where the English Major Fairlie had built a small church in 1918. The Finns travelled to Omafo from Ondonga via Oshigambo, which meant a journey of some 60 kilometres, taking 12 hours with an ox cart, no counting stops along the way.

By 1920, the church work in Oukwanyama involved 40 teachers and 1300 students, and it was getting difficult to administer the work from Ondonga. Thus it was decided to establish a mission station in this kingdom. Permission for this was obtained from the South West African government on 8 December 1920. The place for the mission station was determined by August Hänninen. He had been responsible for the church work in Oukwanyama while he still lived in Oshigambo. The new station was given the name Engela, and it was located ca. two kilometres from Omafo. Missionary Eetu Järvinen joined in the construction of the station, and in November 1920 the station was inaugurated. The following year, nurse Linda Helenius was sent to Engela to help Hänninen.

== Building of the church ==
The parish members of Engela were the most eager church builders in Ovamboland. In 1923, when the church in Omafo was badly run down, the parishioners built a beautiful clay brick church in Engela, assuming most of the expenses themselves.

== The dispute between the Finns and the Anglicans ==
In the early 1920s, the Finnish missionaries had a dispute with the Anglican Church in Ovamboland. The Anglicans wanted Oukwanyama for themselves, but in the end the matter was resolved so that the Finns, the Anglicans and the Catholic Church were all allowed to work in all of South West Africa, and the territory was closed to all other denominations. Although the dispute was settled, it was not possible to found other Finnish mission stations in Oukwanyama for some time, and thus work in other parishes had to be done from Engela. Among these were Endola, 30 km to the south-west, where a church was consecrated in 1927, and Edundja 19 km to the east of Engela.

== The hospital ==
Engela hospital was founded by Linda Helenius in 1921. During 1936–38 Selma Rainio worked as the first doctor of Engela, having left Onandjokwe in the hands of a younger colleague, Anni Melander. However, Rainio’s time in Engela ended with a severe illness, and Melander transferred her to Onandjokwe, where she died on 5 January 1939.

By the 1950s, the number of patients in Engela grew even bigger than that of Onandjokwe, which remained the main medical establishment in Ovamboland.

In 1950, the Engela Parish Institute was founded, in order to train people for service in the ELCIN. This institute continues to thrive today. It seems that the institute was preceded by two separate institutions, a girls’ school and an institute for men.

== Sources ==
- Peltola, Matti (1958). Sata vuotta suomalaista lähetystyötä 1859–1959. II: Suomen Lähetysseuran Afrikan työn historia [‘One Hundred Years of Finnish Missionary Work 1859–1959. II: The History of FMS’s Missionary Work in Africa’]. Helsinki: The Finnish Missionary Society. p. 91.
- Toivo Saarilahti (1999). Kriisien kautta kasvuun. Suomen Lähetysseuran toiminta kotimaassa 1914–1938 [‘Growth through crises. The domestic work of the Finnish Missionary Society 1914–1938’]. Helsinki: Finnish Missionary Society. ISBN 951-624-257-X.
