= Namibia Institute of Pathology =

The Namibia Institute of Pathology Limited (NIP) was established by virtue of the Namibia Institute of Pathology Act 15 of 1999 in August 2000 and started its operations in December 2000. The Institute aims at providing laboratory services to both public and private health sectors across Namibia. The current CEO of NIP is Kapena Tjombonde.

== Services ==
NIP is the largest diagnostic pathology service in Namibia with a total of 37 medical laboratories serving about 80% of the Namibian population.

NIP plays a vital role in the following services;

- Public health in Namibia through epidemiology, surveillance and outbreak response activities;
- The national Anti-retroviral Roll-out programme through CD4, viral load studies and HIV treatment monitoring;
- Provision of quality assurance for national VCT sites;
- Tuberculosis diagnosis and treatment monitoring;
- The screening of cervical cancer;
- Practical training of medical technicians, medical technologists and scientists.

== Location ==
NIP headquarters is located in Windhoek, Corner of Hosea Kutako and Rowan Street.

== Awards ==
The Namibia Institute of Pathology Limited (NIP) was nationally recognized for its dedication to quality service as they scooped second place runner up in the Large Enterprise Service Provider of the year category at the 2025 National Quality Awards.
