= Ohangwena Regional Library =

Regional library in Ohangwena, Namibia

Coordinates: 17.4697°S 15.8945°E

Ohangwena Regional Study and Resource Center
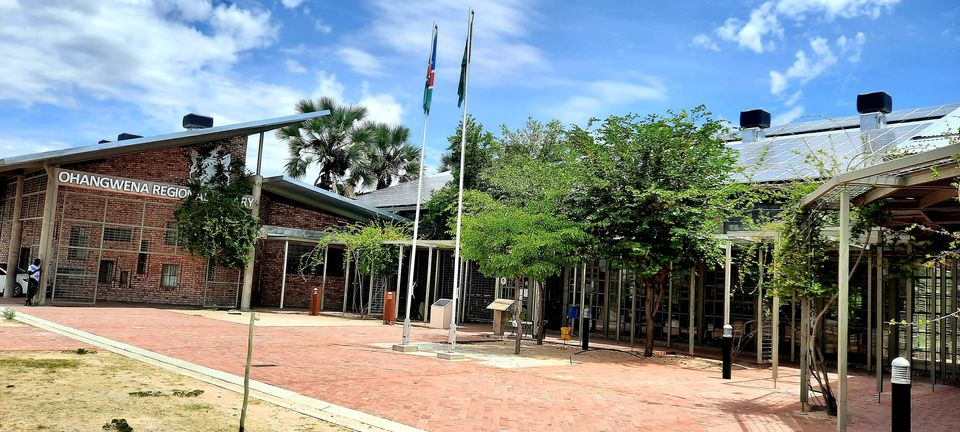
- Ohangwena Regional Study and Resource Center
- Formation: 2014 September 22
- Headquarters: Helao Nafidi, Ohangwena Region, Namibia
- Leader: Ms. Cathrine Ndeshipanda Shikuni
- Website: https://www.facebook.com/ohangwenaregionallibrary

Ohangwena Regional Study and Resource Center (ORSRC) is a library at the Helao Nafidi town council. The library opened in 2014, and it was officially opened by then-president of the Republic of Namibia, Hifikepunye Pohamba.

The library is one of three regional libraries (the other two were built in Oshakati, Oshana; and Gobabis, Omaheke). These libraries are also known as Regional Study and Resource Centers (RSRCs), and were funded by the Millennium Challenge Corporation (Namibia Account) at a cost of N$167 million A majority of learners in the townships of Ohangwena community and the surrounding areas make use of this library to study and research.
