= Helao Nafidi =

Town in northern Namibia

- Town
- Location in Namibia
- Coordinates: 17°27′30″S 15°53′40″E
- Country: Namibia
- Region: Ohangwena Region
- proclaimed: 2004

Government
  - Type: Local Authority Council
  - Mayor: Darius Shaalukeni SWAPO
  - CEO: Inge Ipinge

Area
  - Total: 26.7 sq mi (69.1 km^{2})

Population (2023)
  - Total: 29,119
  - Density: 1,090/sq mi (421/km^{2})
- Time zone: UTC+2 (SAST)
- Climate: Cwa
- Website: www.helao-nafidi.com

Helao Nafidi is a town in Ohangwena Region in northern Namibia at the border to Angola. It had a population of 29,119 people in 2023.

Helao Nafidi has been established in 2004 as an amalgamation of several villages and settlements along the main road between Oshikango and Ohangwena which are both also part of the town. All the independently governed villages that have been combined to form the town (Onhuno, Ohangwena, Omafo, Engela and Oshikango) still maintained their own village councils until the 2015 local authority election.

The town is separated into three urban areas, Oshikango in the north, bisected by the Namibian–Angolan border, and Omafo and Ohangwena south of it, with settlements and villages in the agricultural area between them.

== History ==
The area that today is the town of Helao Nafidi was heavily affected by the South African Border War 1966 to 1989 between South Africa and its allied forces (mainly UNITA) and the Angolan government and South-West Africa People's Organisation (SWAPO). The border post at Oshikango, one of the oldest between Namibia and Angola, had been near destroyed in the guerrilla war, and the settlement appeared dilapidated until the mid-1990s. After Namibian independence several settlements were proclaimed villages in 1996 in order to increase border trade.

== Economy and infrastructure ==
The border post at Oshikango is currently the busiest Namibian border post with on average 500 people crossing per day. This has brought business opportunities to the surrounding area. With the help of the European Union an Export Processing Zone was established there, consisting of 14 warehouses. Omafo, another suburb of Helao Nafidi, hosts Helao Nafidi Annual trade fair and expo.

The parallel prevalence of land owned by the villages, the town, and land under traditional jurisdiction has led to uncertainties about ownership that had to be settled in court. The case of Helao Nafidi, where traditional authorities and the town and village councils frequently disagree on what is in their respective jurisdictions, can be seen as an example of the clash between tradition and modernity in Namibian law.

=== Transport ===
In mid-2005, the second stage of the new Northern Railway began construction from Oshivelo to Oshikango. By mid-2006, it had reached Ondangwa. A train called Omugulugwombashe Star traveled weekly on this track until the locomotives broke down after a few rounds of service and were found unsuitable for Namibia’s railway network. The railway extension to Ohangwena and Oshikango is under construction, and a short extension across the border was proposed in 2008 to bypass the congested border post.

In October 2022, the town was equipped with Namibia Traffic System offices, which will handle the registration and licensing of vehicles, annual renewal of vehicle licences, renewal of driving licences, and testing and issuing of learners' licences.

== Education ==
The Town council has various educational institutions ranging from primary schools to vocational educational institutions such as

- Oshilkango Combined School
- Onakambuda Primary School
- Omutaku Combined School
- Ponhofi Senior Secondary School
- Ongha Vocational Training Center

In September 2022, The UNESCO Institute for Lifelong Learning has approved Helao Nafidi Town Council's membership to join the UNESCO Global Network of Learning Cities, the first town in Namibia to be admitted to the UNESCO Global Network of Learning Cities.

== Politics ==
Helao Nafidi is governed by a town council that has seven seats.

The 2015 local authority election was won by SWAPO which gained six seats (2,261 votes). The remaining seat was won by the Rally for Democracy and Progress (RDP) with 272 votes. SWAPO also won the 2020 local authority election. It obtained 1,635 votes and gained five seats. The Independent Patriots for Change (IPC), an opposition party formed in August 2020, obtained 690 votes and gained the remaining two seats. New entrant Darius Shaalukeni from Swapo was elected as the new mayor of Helao Nafidi, deputised by Penexupifo Matias.

== People ==
Historical population
Year	Pop.	±% p.a.
2011	19,375	—
2023	29,119	+3.45%

Helao Nafidi is inhabited by the Kwanyama community, a subgroup of the Ovambo. Members of this community live on both sides of the border and speak the same language.

In the years 2005 and thereafter, foreign investors, mainly Chinese, have bought communal land in large quantities, leaving villagers without the means to raise livestock and farm. Some of the land transfers are thought to be unlawful, facilitated by corrupt town officials. The influx of Chinese businesspeople has been dubbed an "invasion".

== See also ==
- Ohangwena Regional Library
