= Edundja =

- Settlement
- Location within Namibia
- Coordinates: 17°25′S 16°00′E
- Country: Namibia
- Region: Ohangwena Region
- Constituency: Oshikango Constituency
- Time zone: UTC+2 (SAST)

Oshikango constituency (red) in the Ohangwena Region of Namibia

Edundja is a settlement in the Ohangwena Region of northern Namibia. It is situated close to the Angolan border 15 kilometres (9.3 mi) east of Oshikango. Edundja is the administrative centre of Oshikango Constituency.

== Infrastructure ==
The village has reasonably well-developed infrastructure with access to potable water and electricity, although the access roads are not tarred. There are a clinic, a church, and two schools, The schools are Edundja Primary School and Edundja Junior Secondary School. There is also Edundja ELCIN Church.
