= Finnish Evangelical Lutheran Mission =

Finnish Lutheran missionary society

- Finnish Evangelical Lutheran Mission
- Suomen Lähetysseura
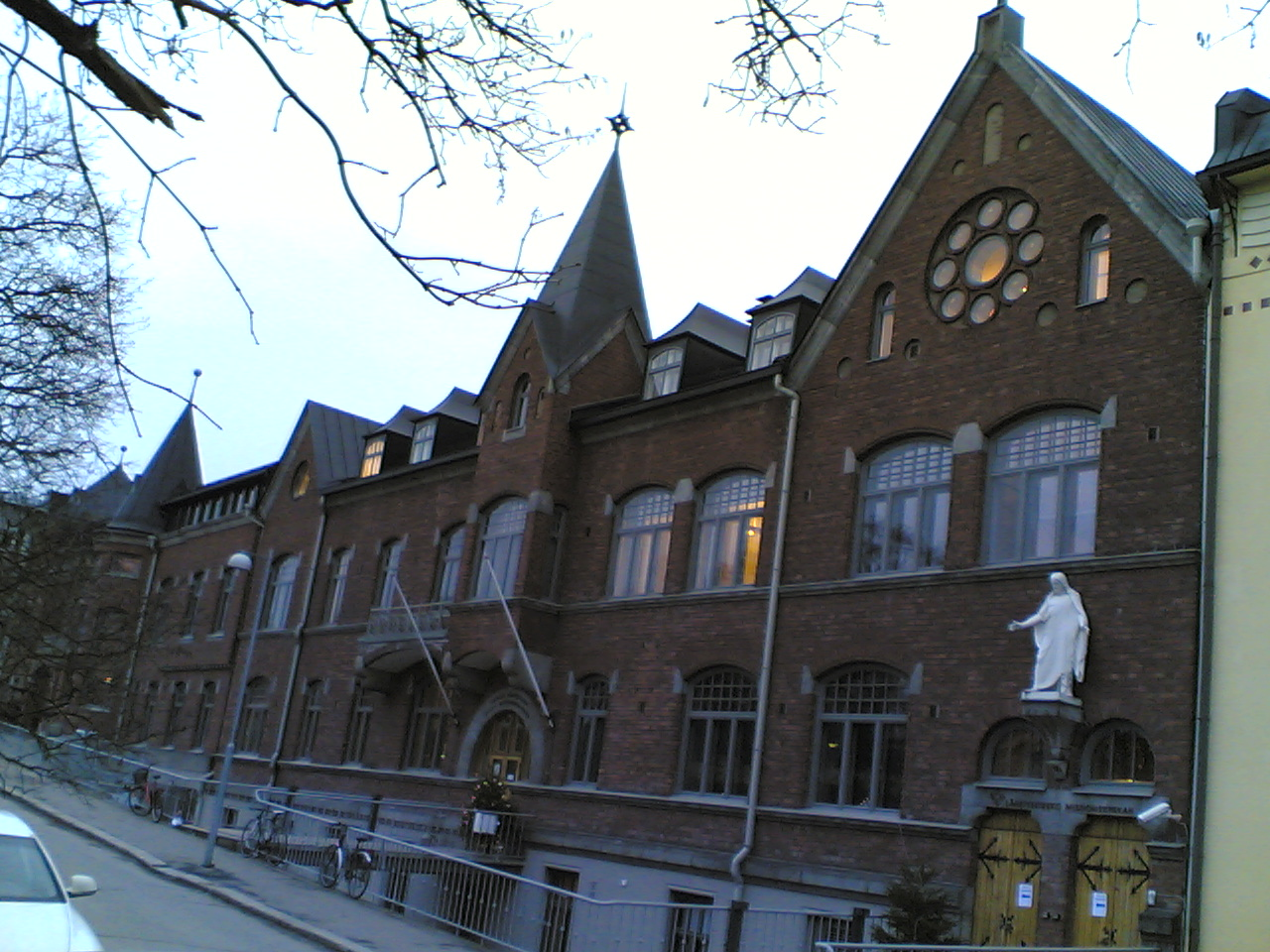
- Lähetystalo at the Tähtitorninkatu street in Ullanlinna, Helsinki, Finland
- Abbreviation: FELM
- Predecessor: Finska Missionssällskapet (The Finnish Missionary Society)
- Formation: 1859
- Type: Missionary Society
- Parent organization: Evangelical Lutheran Church of Finland
- Affiliations: Lutheranism
- Website: https://felm.org

The Finnish Evangelical Lutheran Mission (FELM, formerly The Finnish Missionary Society; Finnish: Suomen Lähetysseura ry; Swedish: Finska Missionssällskapet rf) is a Lutheran missionary society formed on January 19, 1859, in Helsinki, Finland. It is one of seven organisations of the Evangelical Lutheran Church of Finland (ELCF) that conduct missionary work. Its first deployments outside Finland were made to Ovamboland, an area that today is cut by the Angola-Namibian border.

== History ==
The FMS was organized by K. J. G. Sirelius, who first worked as the society's secretary and during 1864–1872 as its first mission director. The FMS mission school was also founded during his term.

The first missionaries from this society graduated in 1868 and were deployed to the Ovambo area in southern Africa that was later separated by colonial borders into southern Angola and northern South West Africa, today Namibia, in 1870. There they established the mission station at Omandongo, today in the Onayena Constituency of Oshikoto Region. The mission station was proclaimed a national monument in 2014.

At the request of the Rhenish Missionary Society, but also due to a contempt of the politics and ideas of the German missionaries, their activities started with the Ondonga tribe of the Ovambo people. They later spread to all of Ovamboland, southern parts of Angola, and to the area that today is the Kavango Region. The first Ovambo pastors were ordained in 1925.

By 1960, the society had deployed over 100 people in Ovamboland alone. Following political unrest in the Namibian struggle for independence, in the 1980s there were only 14 Finns left. After independence, Finland became one of the major supporters of development in Namibia. The Finnish Missionary Society ceded their missionary work and instead started to promote "friendship between the independent churches".

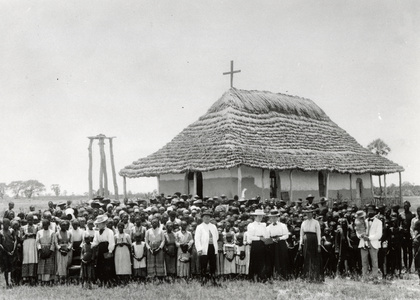
Missionary Rautanen (front center) in Olukonda, 1899

The best-known Finnish missionary in Namibia was Nakambale (Ndonga for 'the one who wears the hat'), a nickname given to Martti Rautanen. From 1880, Rautanen worked in Olukonda at one of the first mission stations to the Ovambo people. He initiated the building of the first church in Ovamboland in 1889, and he translated the Bible into Oshindonga, a dialect of Oshivambo.

With a consortium of other mission agencies, in 1966 the FELM was also involved in establishing the China Lutheran Seminary in Hsinchu City, Taiwan.

== See also ==
- Finland–Namibia relations
- The Finnish dormitory in Taichung
- China Lutheran Seminary
- Seppo Salko

== Sources ==
- Peltola, Matti (1958). Sata vuotta suomalaista lähetystyötä 1859–1959. II: Suomen Lähetysseuran Afrikan työn historia. Helsinki: Agricola-seura.
